= Romaldo Giurgola =

American/Australian architect

Romaldo Giurgola AO
- Born: 2 September 1920; Rome (or Galatina)
- Died: 16 May 2016 (aged 95); Canberra, Australia
- Education: Sapienza University of Rome, Columbia University
- Occupation: Architect
- Awards: AIA Gold Medal (1982); RAIA Gold Medal (1988); Officer of the Order of Australia (1989 ) Australian Centenary Medal (2001); Sir Zelman Cowen Award for Public Architecture (1989 & 2004); Canberra Medallion (1990); Sir Roy Grounds Award for Enduring Architecture (2013 & 2018)
- Practice: Mitchell/Giurgola & Thorp (MGT)
- Buildings: Parliament House in Canberra

Romaldo "Aldo" Giurgola (1920 – 16 May 2016) was an Italian-born academic, architect, professor, and author. He worked with various other architects, including in practices named Mitchell/Giurgola, and, in Australia, with Australian architect Richard Thorp, Mitchell/Giurgola & Thorp (MGT). He is known for his award-winning design of Parliament House in Canberra, Australia.

== Early life and education ==
Romaldo Giurgola was born in Rome (or Galatina), Italy, in 1920.

After service in the Italian armed forces during World War II, he studied architecture at the Sapienza University of Rome, completing the equivalent of a B.Arch. with honors in 1949.

After being awarded a Fulbright Scholarship in his graduation year, Giurgola moved to the United States and received a master's degree in architecture from Columbia University in 1951.

== Career ==
=== Academia ===
In 1954, Giurgola accepted a position as an assistant professor of architecture at the University of Pennsylvania.

Giurgola was appointed chair of the Columbia University School of Architecture in 1965.

=== Architecture ===
==== US ====
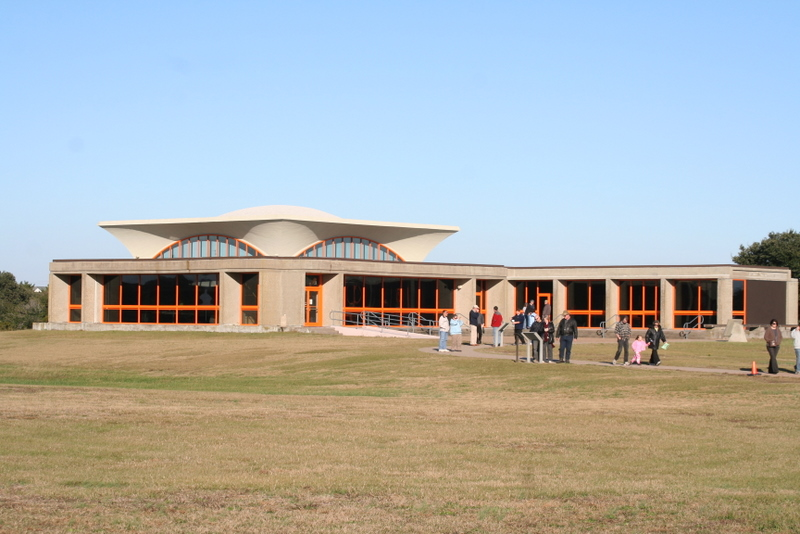
Wright Brothers National Memorial Visitor Center (1958–60), Kitty Hawk, North Carolina

Giurgola formed Mitchell/Giurgola Architects in Philadelphia with Ehrman B. Mitchell in 1958. After becoming chair at Columbia University architecture school, he opened a second office of the firm in New York City.

The first important building of Mitchell/Giurgola was the Wright Brothers National Memorial Visitor Center (1957) for the US National Park Service, a building that brought them national attention for three reasons. It was one of the first NPS visitors' centres that became a building type unto itself. The design was consonant with a certain aesthetic preoccupation with aviation, flight, technology and space travel of the time, the same zeitgeist that produced Saarinen's TWA Terminal at John F. Kennedy International Airport. It was seen as a break with strict modernist tenets in its respect for the site and the program, as opposed to what Giurgola called "the imposition of abstract forms".

In Philadelphia, Giurgola had formed a relationship with Louis Kahn, who held similar views. In April 1961 the architectural critic Jan Rowan grouped Giurgola, Kahn, Robert Venturi, George Qualls, Robert Geddes and others, into "the Philadelphia school of architecture", which had high regard for classical Roman architecture. Giurgola published several books on Kahn's work and philosophy.

==== Australia ====
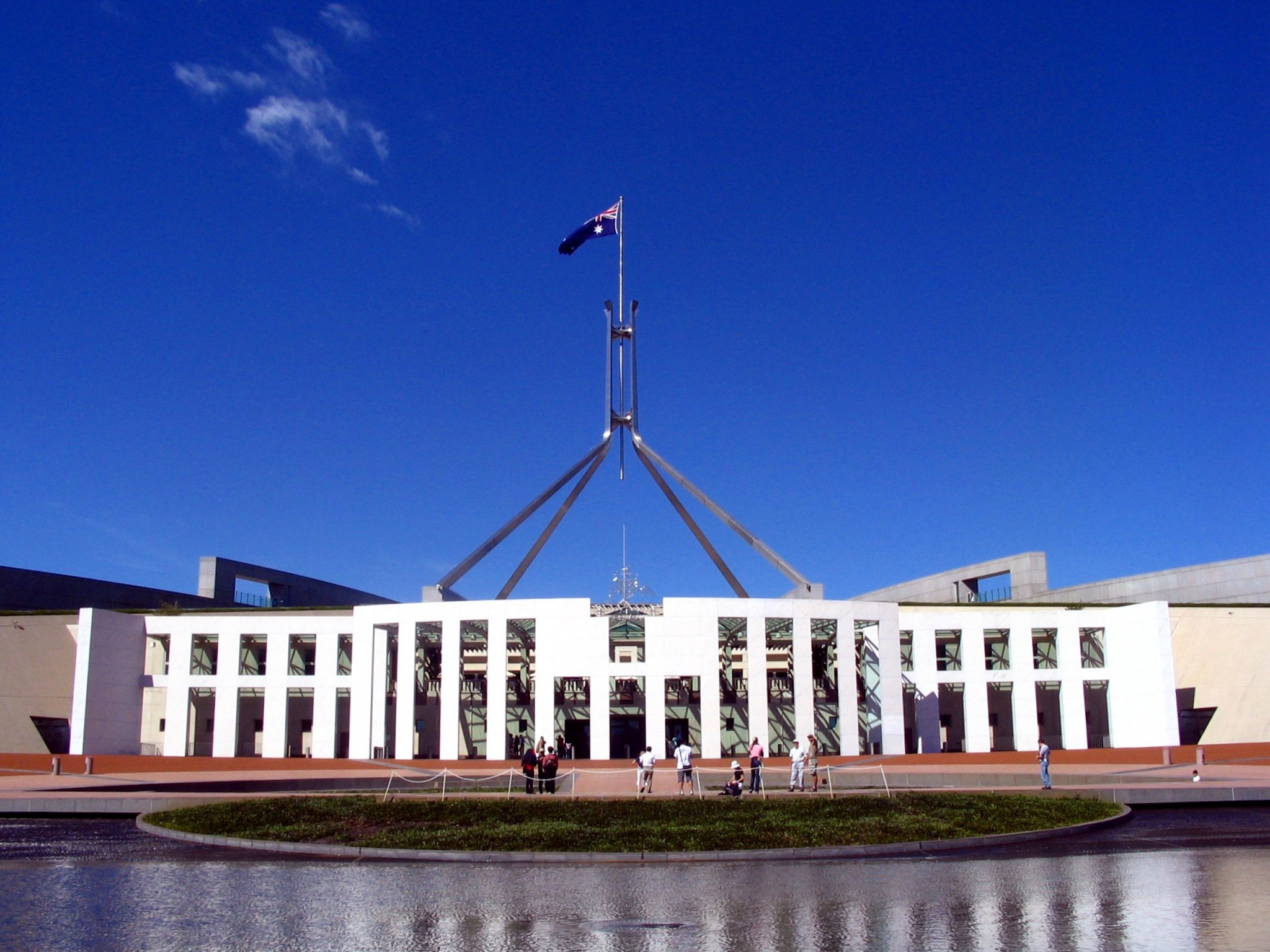
Parliament House (1981–88), Canberra

Giurgola was invited to join the panel of judges for the 1978 international competition for the new Australian Parliament House in Canberra. Instead, he chose to enter the competition. The firm won the competition, and Giurgola moved to Canberra to oversee the project. Working with Australian architect Richard Thorp, their practice was called Mitchell/Giurgola & Thorp (MGT) between 1980 and 1990. In 1989, after its completion and official opening in 1988, the Parliament House was recognised with the top award for public architecture in Australia, the Sir Zelman Cowen Award for Public Architecture.

== Personal life ==
Giurgola moved to Australia and practised there after Parliament House was completed. He was married to Adelaide, who was born in the US. She developed Alzheimer's disease in later life and died in Australia in 1997. Giurgola took up Australian citizenship in January 2000.

By 2005 he had built his own house at Lake Bathurst, near Goulburn, New South Wales.

== Recognition and awards ==
In 1978, he was a Resident in Architecture at the American Academy in Rome.

In 1982, he was awarded the AIA Gold Medal by the American Institute of Architects.

In 1982 he was elected into the National Academy of Design as an Associate member, and became a full Academician in 1994.

The Association of Collegiate Schools of Architecture (ACSA) honored Giurgola with its Distinguished Professor Award in 1987-88.

He was awarded the RAIA Gold Medal by the Royal Australian Institute of Architects in 1988.

In January 1989 he was appointed an Honorary Officer of the Order of Australia, for 'service to architecture, particularly the new Parliament House, Canberra'. The award became substantive when he adopted Australian citizenship in 2000.

In 1989 he won the Sir Zelman Cowen Award for Public Architecture for Parliament House.

In 1990 Giurgola's second notable Canberra building, the modest St Thomas Aquinas Church in Charnwood opened in 1989, winning the ACT Chapter of the Australian Institute of Architects Canberra Medallion. It was later awarded the 2018 Sir Roy Grounds Award for Enduring Architecture, 29 years after completion.

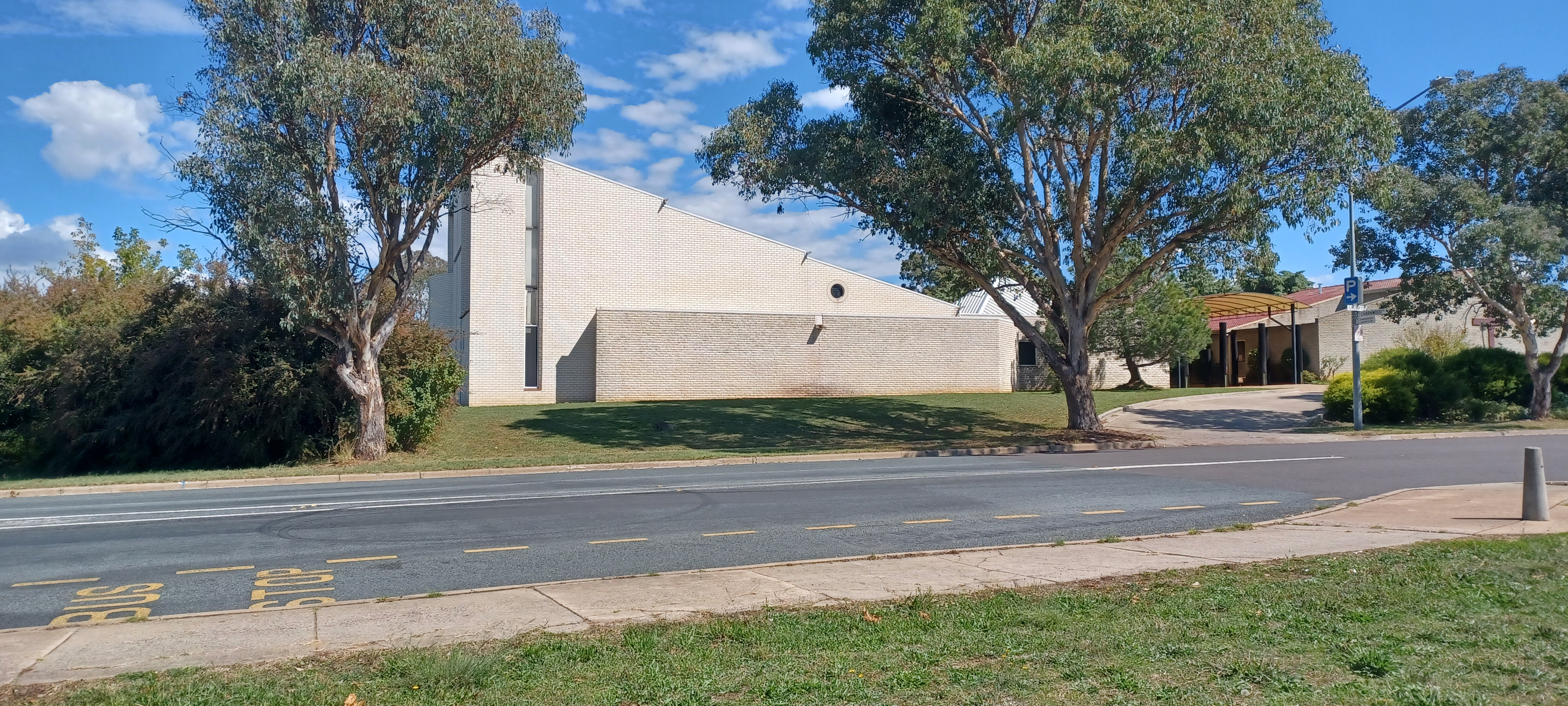
St Thomas Aquinas Catholic Church, Charnwood, Canberra, 1990

In 2001, he was awarded the Australian Centenary Medal for 'service as Principal Architect of the new and permanent Parliament House'.

In 2003 he was awarded an honorary doctorate from the University of Sydney.

In 2004 his St Patrick's Cathedral, Parramatta, won him Australia's highest architectural award, the RAIA's Sir Zelman Cowen Award for Public Architecture.

A portrait of Romaldo Giurgola painted by Mandy Martin, was gifted by the RAIA to the National Portrait Gallery in Canberra in 2005.

== Projects ==
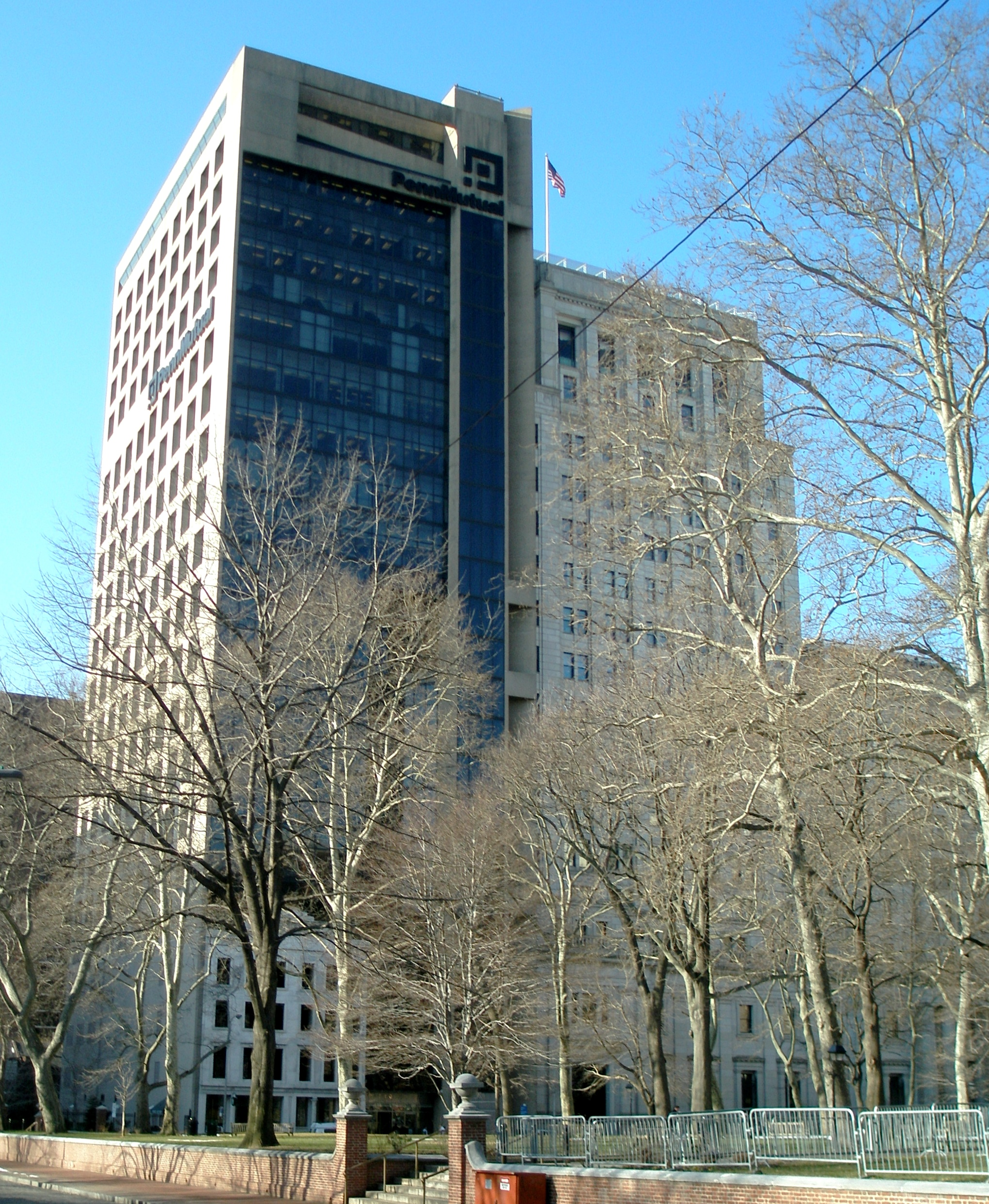
Penn Mutual Tower (1971–75), opposite Independence Hall, Philadelphia, Pennsylvania

- Wright Brothers National Memorial Visitor Center, Kitty Hawk, North Carolina (1958–60).
- Weatherspoon Art Museum, Greensboro, North Carolina (1989).
- Additions to University of Pennsylvania Museum of Archaeology and Anthropology, Philadelphia, Pennsylvania (1960–73).
- Kenneth and Judy Dayton Residence, Wayzata, Minnesota (1970). Demolished 2016.
- United Fund Headquarters Building, Philadelphia, Pennsylvania (1971)
- Boston Public Library, South End Branch (1971).
- INA Tower, Philadelphia, Pennsylvania (1971–75)
- Penn Mutual Tower, Philadelphia, Pennsylvania (1971–75)
- Columbus East High School, Columbus, Indiana (1972)
- Lang Music Building, Swarthmore College, Swarthmore, Pennsylvania (1973)
- Casa Thomas Jefferson, Brasília, Brazil (1974)

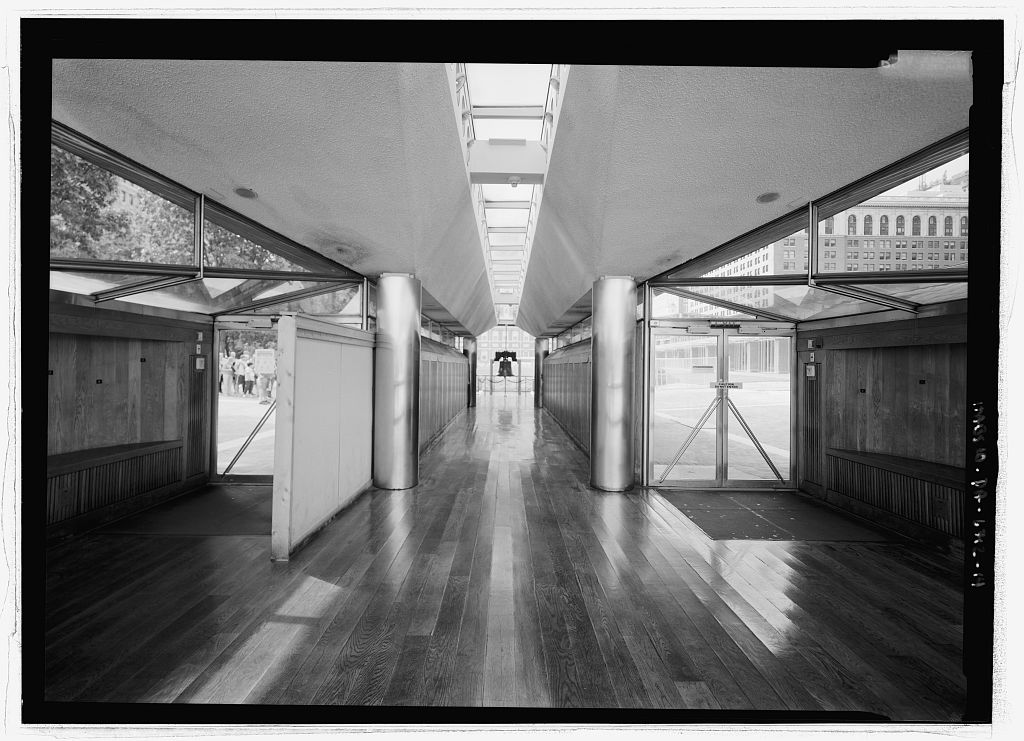
Liberty Bell Center (1974–75, demolished 2006), Philadelphia, Pennsylvania

- Liberty Bell Pavilion, Independence National Historical Park, Philadelphia, Pennsylvania (1974–75, demolished 2006)
- Tredyffrin Public Library, Strafford, Pennsylvania (1976).
- Sherman Fairchild Center for the Life Sciences, Columbia University, New York City (1977).
- Wainwright State Office Building, St. Louis, MO (1981).
- Walter Royal Davis Library, UNC, Chapel Hill, NC (1982).
- Parliament House, Canberra, Australia (1981–1988)
- AB Volvo Corporate Headquarters, Gothenburg, Sweden (1984)
- Layfayette Place (now Swissotel), Boston, Massachusetts (1985).
- Virginia Air and Space Center / Hampton Roads History Center, Hampton, VA (1987 / 1992).

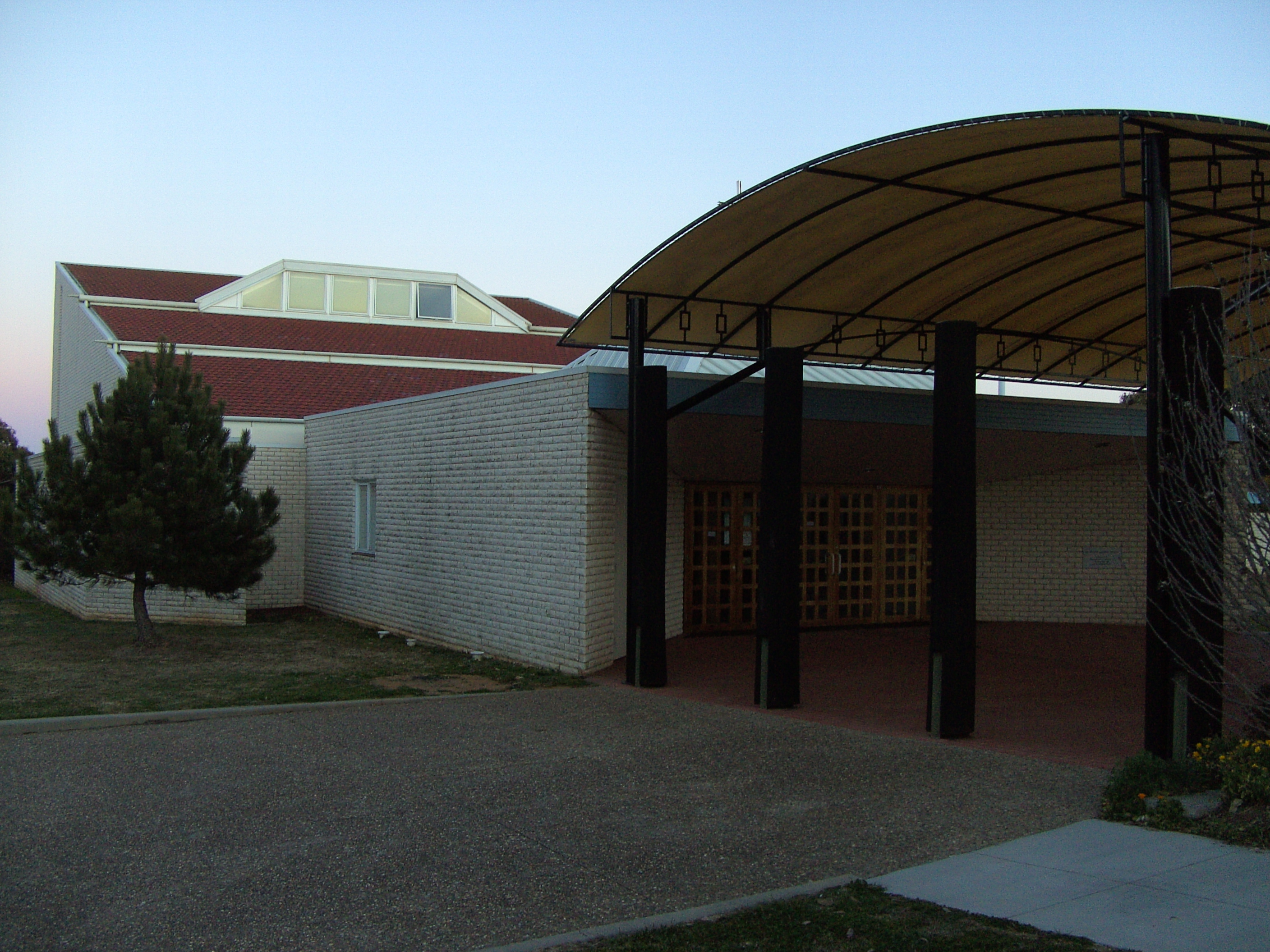
St Thomas Aquinas Catholic Church, Charnwood, ACT (1989), north side and entrance doors

- St Thomas Aquinas Catholic Church, Charnwood, Australian Capital Territory, (1989) 35.205675°S 149.031897°E
- IBM Advanced Business Institute, Palisades NY (1989)
- Solana Westlake Park, Southlake, TX (1989)
- Life Sciences Building, CIBA Pharmaceuticals, Summit, New Jersey (1994)
- Addition to St Patrick's Cathedral, Parramatta, New South Wales, Australia (2003)
- Spence Wing, State Library of South Australia, Adelaide (with Hassell; 2001-2003)
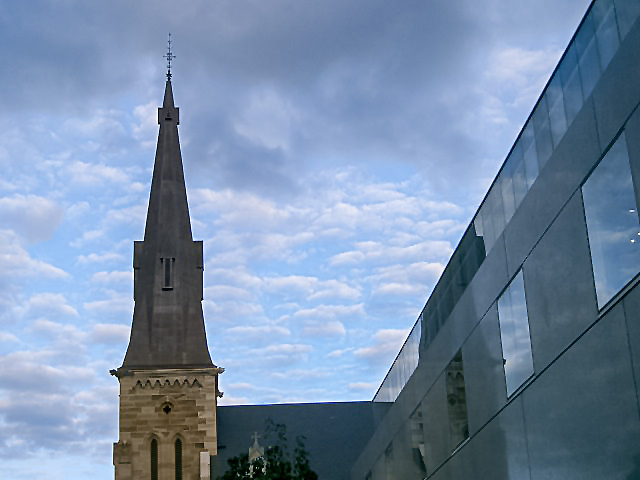
St Patrick's Cathedral, Parramatta, New South Wales, Australia (2003 addition, right)
