= Sir Roy Grounds Award for Enduring Architecture =

Annual award for significant buildings in Australian Capital Territory

- 2022 Award, Manning Clark House
- Awarded for: Significant ACT architecture more than 25 years old
- Country: Australia
- Presented by: Australian Institute of Architects (ACT Chapter)
- Formerly called: 25 Year Award
- First award: 1995; 31 years ago
- Currently held by: Jackson and Walker, 2026

The Sir Roy Grounds Award for Enduring Architecture is an architecture prize presented annually by the Australian Capital Territory (ACT) Chapter of the Australian Institute of Architects (AIA) since 1995. The award recognises significant, long lasting and innovative architecture with usually more than 25 years passed since the completion of construction.

== Background ==
When first established the award was known as the 25 Year Award. In 2007 the award name was changed to the '25 Year Award for Enduring Architecture (ACT Chapter)' and later becoming the 'ACT Award for Enduring Architecture' in 2011, in line with the national awards program and other chapter awards. In 2018 the award became a named award after well known Melbourne based architect Roy Grounds (1905—1981), a Canberra Medallion winner and a two time winner of the ACT Chapter 25 Year Award in 1998 and 2001.

The inaugural 25 Year Award was given in 1995 to the Dickson Library designed by Enrico Taglietti. This was the first instance of an award for enduring architecture to be presented in Australia by any chapter of the Australian Institute of Architects. The inaugural National, New South Wales, Queensland and Victorian awards for enduring architecture were presented eight years later in 2003. The 25 Year Award followed in the tradition of the American Institute of Architects 25 Year Award first presented in 1969.

The average age of the 38 projects winning the award, after completion of construction, is 37.3 years (1995—2026).

25 Year Award, RAIA headquarters, Red Hill, Canberra, 2002

== National Award Winners ==
Recipients of this local award are eligible for consideration for the National Award for Enduring Architecture presented later in the same year, as part of the Australian National Architecture Awards.

Two winning projects located in the ACT have won the National Award for Enduring Architecture. In 2007 the High Court of Australia Building by Edwards Madigan Torzillo Briggs won the local and national award 27 years after the building was completed in 1980. In 2013 the new Australian Parliament House by Mitchell Giurgola and Thorp also won both awards, 25 years after opening in 1988.

== Jury Citations ==
=== 2021 Award ===
The Jury for the 2021 Sir Roy Grounds Award was Philip Leeson FRAIA (Jury Chair) from Philip Leeson Architects, Ken Charlton AM LFRAIA an architectural historian and Rachel Jackson, principal at GML Heritage.

The 2021 jury citation described the winning Concrete bus shelters in Canberra as having "... architectural integrity and enduring quality of the design is evident through its simplicity, functionality, and materiality. The form of the bus shelter is unique, yet it serves the utilitarian function well, and better still, the shelters were designed to be relocated when required."

=== 2022 Award ===
The Enduring Architecture Award Jury for 2022 was composed of jury chair Eric Martin (Eric Martin & Associates), Nicholas Goodwin (SQC Group) and Anna Leeson (GML Heritage). The award was given to Robin Boyd's 1956 Manning Clark House the same year as another Robin Boyd project was awarded the Jack Cheesman Award for Enduring Architecture for the Walkley House in North Adelaide, South Australia.

The 2022 jury citation described the Manning Clark House that it "...remains remarkably intact and embodies many design features which were innovative for its time, but are now accepted as sound design and sustainable features for modern houses".

=== 2023 Award ===
The Jury for the 2023 Award consisted of Jury Chair Can Ercan RAIA (Filardo Ercan Architects), Yuri Leong Maish FRAIA (May + Russell Architects) and Murray Brown, ACT Chapter Heritage Committee Member.

The jury citation summary states that "The Chancery was opened by then Prime Minister Paul Keating in August 1995 and has since undergone various technological and servicing updates, all integrated seamlessly and considerate of the original design intent. It is a well-maintained building that enhances the integrity of Government House and the significant landscaped grounds on Lake Burley Griffin and is a worthy recipient of the 2023 Sir Roy Grounds Award for Enduring Architecture Award."

=== 2024 Award ===
The awarded project was the suburban shopping centre located in the Canberra suburb of Torrens by architect Dirk Bolt and completed in 1968. The jury citation noted that the roof form is a strong gesture that has created 'a generous sheltered area that invites shoppers to stop and chat.' The jury for the 2024 ACT Awards was composed of John Guida, Craig Tan, Vassiliki Gracik, Sally Farrah and Jessica de Rome (Chair).

== Award recipients ==
Sir Roy Grounds Award for Enduring Architecture (reverse order)
Year	Architect	Project	Location	Year Built	Years Since	Other AIA Awards
2026	Jackson Walker for NCDC	ANU School of Music	Australian National University, Building 100, William Herbert Place, Acton	1976	50 years	
2025	Miles Jakl and Enrico Taglietti and ACME	Former Carousel Restaurant; 60 Red Hill Drive	Red Hill Lookout, Red Hill	1963, modified 1981 (restored 2024)	61 years	
2024	Dirk Bolt	Torrens Neighbourhood Centre	Torrens Place, Torrens	1967	56 years	
2023	Pegrum/Ciolek Architects	The Chancery	Yarralumla, Government House, Canberra	1995	28 years	
2022	Robin Boyd	Manning Clark House	11 Tasmania Circle, Forrest	1953	69 years	
2021	Clem Cummings	Canberra's Concrete Bus Shelters	Canberra wide	1975—1995	46 years	
2020	Ian Slater	Greenwood House	Canberra	1975	45 years	
2019	Michael Dysart	Wybalena Grove (Cook Aranda Housing Cooperative)	Wybalena Grove, Cook, Canberra	1974	45 years	
2018	Mitchell\Giurgola & Thorp	St Thomas Aquinas Catholic Church	19 Lhotsky Street, Charnwood	1989	29 years	Canberra Medallion, 1990
2017	Harry Seidler	Lakeview Townhouses	127 Hopetoun Circuit, Yarralumla	1984	34 years	
2016	Laurie Virr	Rivendell House	17 Meredith Circuit, Kambah	1975	41 years	
2015	Dirk Bolt and Associates	Burgmann College	Australian National University, 52 Daley Road, Acton	1971	44 years	
2014	Enrico Taglietti	Apostolic Nunciature	2 Vancouver Street, Red Hill	1977	37 years	
2013	Mitchell\Giurgola & Thorp	Australian Parliament House	Canberra	1988	25 years	National Award for Enduring Architecture, 2013; Sir Zelman Cowen Award for Public Architecture, 1989; Canberra Medallion, 1989
2012	Daryl Jackson	National Sports Centre Swimming Halls	Australian Institute of Sport, Leverrier Crescent, Bruce	1984	28 years	Sir Zelman Cowen Award for Public Architecture, 1984; Canberra Medallion, 1984; RAIA National Award for Design Excellence
2011	Department of Works	Red Hill Primary School	Astrolabe Street, Red Hill	1960	51 years	
2010	Robin Gibson and Partners	Belconnen Library	12 Chandler Street, Belconnen	1981	29 years	Canberra Medallion, 1982
2009	Ancher Mortlock Murray and Woolley	CSIRO FC Pye Laboratory (Building 19)	Building 19, Clunies Ross Street, Black Mountain Science and Innovation Precinct (off Dickson Way) Acton	1966	43 years	(Demolition proposed 2022)
2008	No Award					
2007	Edwards Madigan Torzillo Briggs	High Court of Australia Building	Parkes Place, Parkes	1980	27 years	National Award for Enduring Architecture, 2007; Canberra Medallion, 1980
2006	John FD Scarborough and Partners in association with Collard Clarke and Jackson	RG Menzies Building (University Library)	Australian National University, Building 2, McDonald Road, Acton	1963	44 years	
2006	Enrico Taglietti	Paterson House	7 Juad Place, Aranda	1970	36 years	
2005	Roger Pegrum	Wilson House	38 Mirning Crescent, Aranda	1972	33 years	CS Daley Medal, 1974
2005	Philip Cox	Jerilderie Court Medium Density Housing	17 Allambee Street, Reid	1977	28 years	CS Daley Medal, 1978
2004	No Award					
2003	No Award					
2002	Bryce Mortlock (Ancher Mortlock Murray & Woolley)	RAIA Headquarters	2a Mugga Way, Red Hill	1970	32 years	
2002	Michael Dysart	Urambi Village Housing Cooperative	Urambi Village, 81 Crozier Circuit, Kambah	1977	25 years	CS Daley Medal for Housing, 1977
2002	National Capital Development Commission	Woden Valley residential areas of Hughes, Curtin and Lyons	Hughes, Curtin, Lyons suburbs, Canberra	1960—1962	40 years	
2001	Grounds, Romberg & Boyd	Australian Academy of Science (The Shine Dome)	15 Gordon Street, Acton, Canberra	1959	42 years	Sir John Sulman Medal, 1959; Meritorious Architecture Award, ACT, 1959; Canberra Medallion, 1961
2000	Dirk Bolt	Bahr House	1 Astley Place, Garran	1967	33 years	
1999	Harry Seidler	Edmund Barton Building	47 Kings Way, Barton	1970	29 years	
1999	Ian McKay and Partners	Swinger Hill Housing Precinct Stage 1	Barnet Close, Phillip	1971	28 years	CS Daley Medal, 1977
1998	Sydney Ancher (Ancher, Mortlock and Murray)	Northbourne Housing Group	Northbourne, Avenue Lyneham & Dickson	1959	39 years	
1998	Fowell, Mansfield Jarvis & Maclurcan	Anzac Memorial Chapel of St Paul	Corner of Robert Campbell Road & Miles Road, Royal Military College, Duntroon	1966	32 years	
1998	Grounds Romberg & Boyd	Vasey Crescent houses	42, 44 & 46 Vasey Crescent, Campbell	1960	38 years	
1997	Ken Woolley (Ancher Mortlock Woolley)	National Seventh Day Adventist Church	MacLeay Street & Gould Street, Turner	1971	26 years	Heritage listed 2023.
1997	Rosman Hastings and Sorel (Peter Sorel)	Norwood Park Crematorium	65 Sandford Street, Mitchell	1968	29 years	Canberra Medallion, 1968
1996	Stuart McIntosh	ANZ Bank Building (former ES&A Bank)	17 London Circuit, Canberra	1963	33 years	
1995	Enrico Taglietti	Dickson Library	Anthill Street, Dickson	1969	26 years	

== Gallery ==
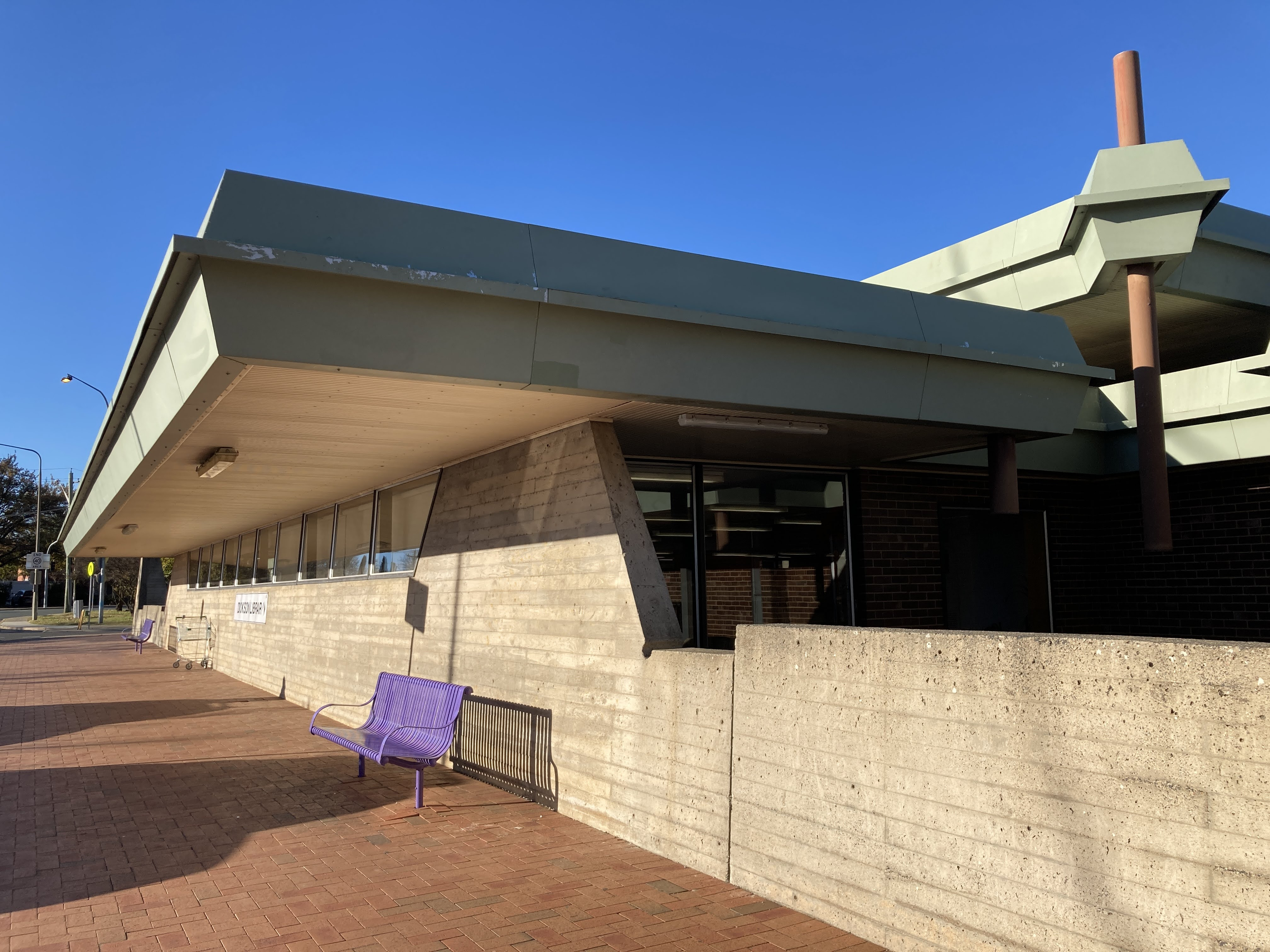
1995 Award, Dickson Library, opened 1969

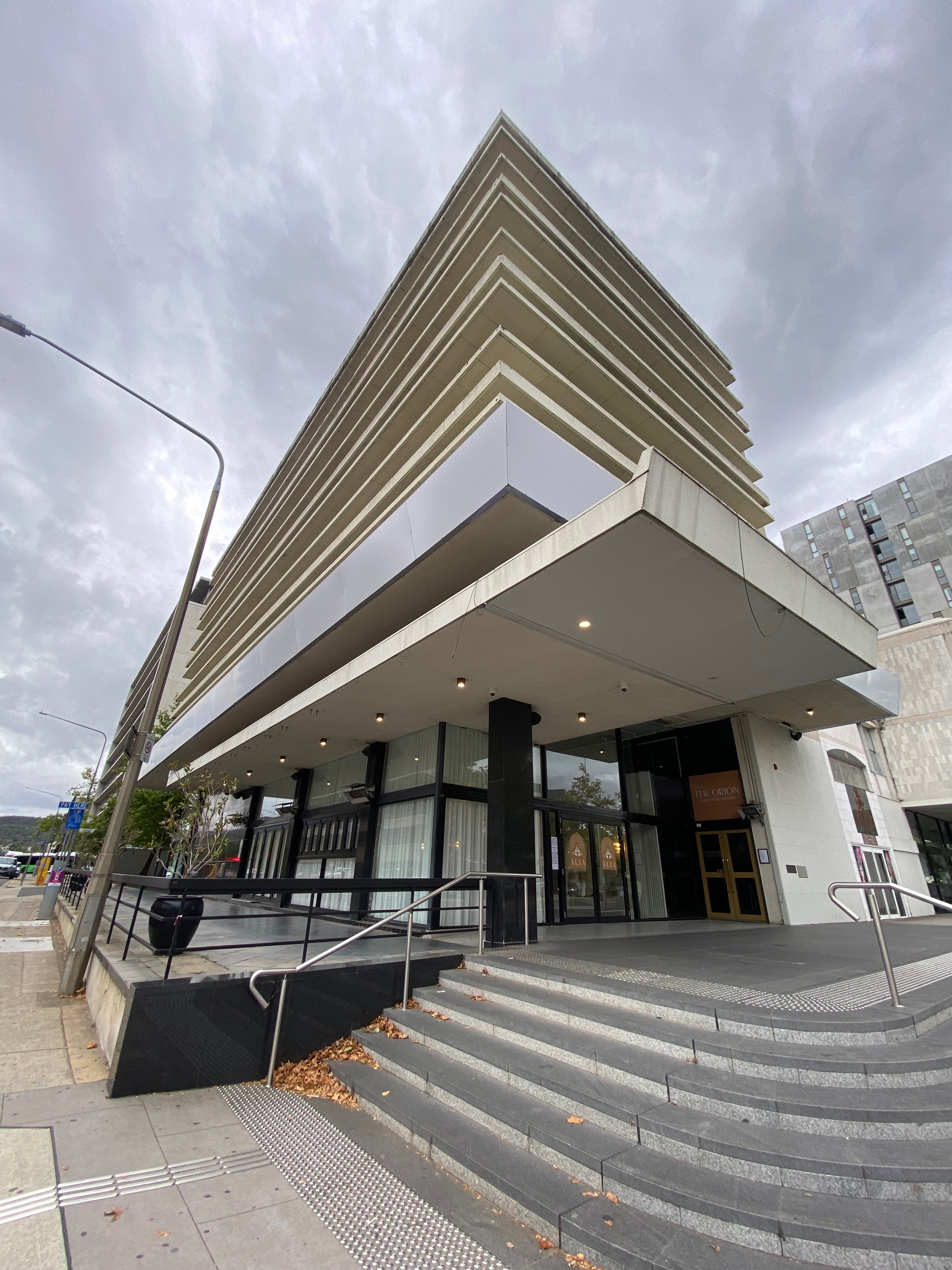
1996 Award, ES&A Bank, 17 London Circuit, built 1963

1999 Award, Edmund Barton Building, opened 1970

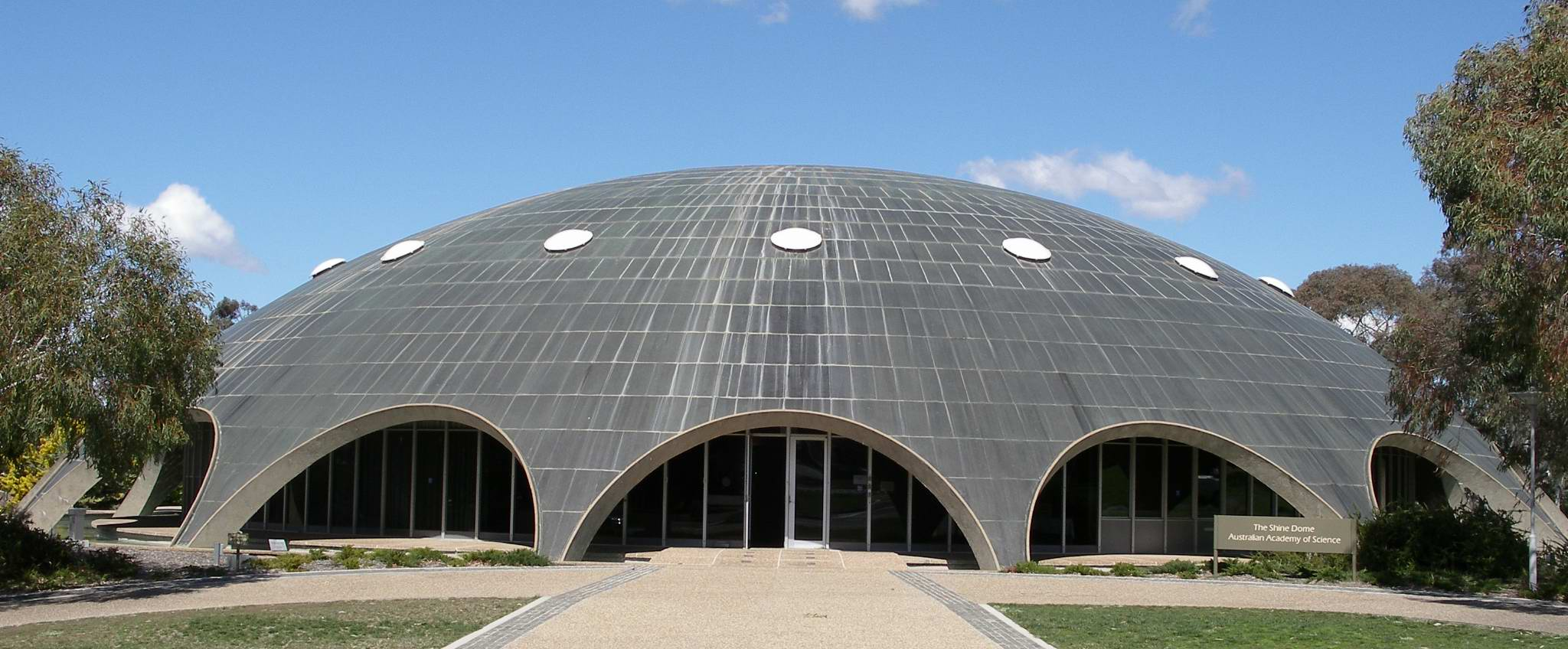
2001 Award, Australian Academy of Science, opened 1959

2002 Award, RAIA Headquarters, completed 1970

2002 Award, Urambi Village Housing Cooperative, completed 1977

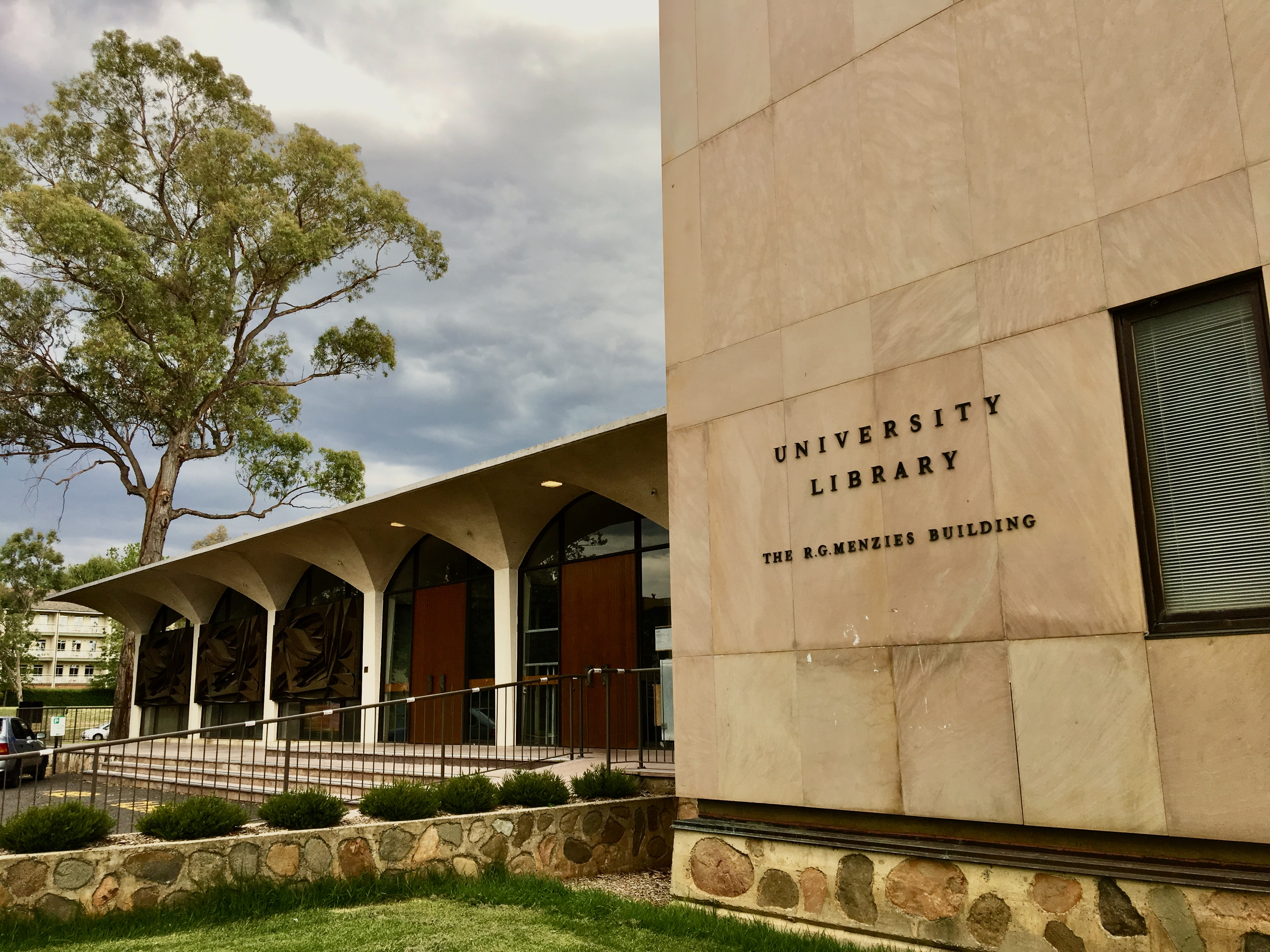
2006 Award, RG Menzies Building, University Library, opened 1963

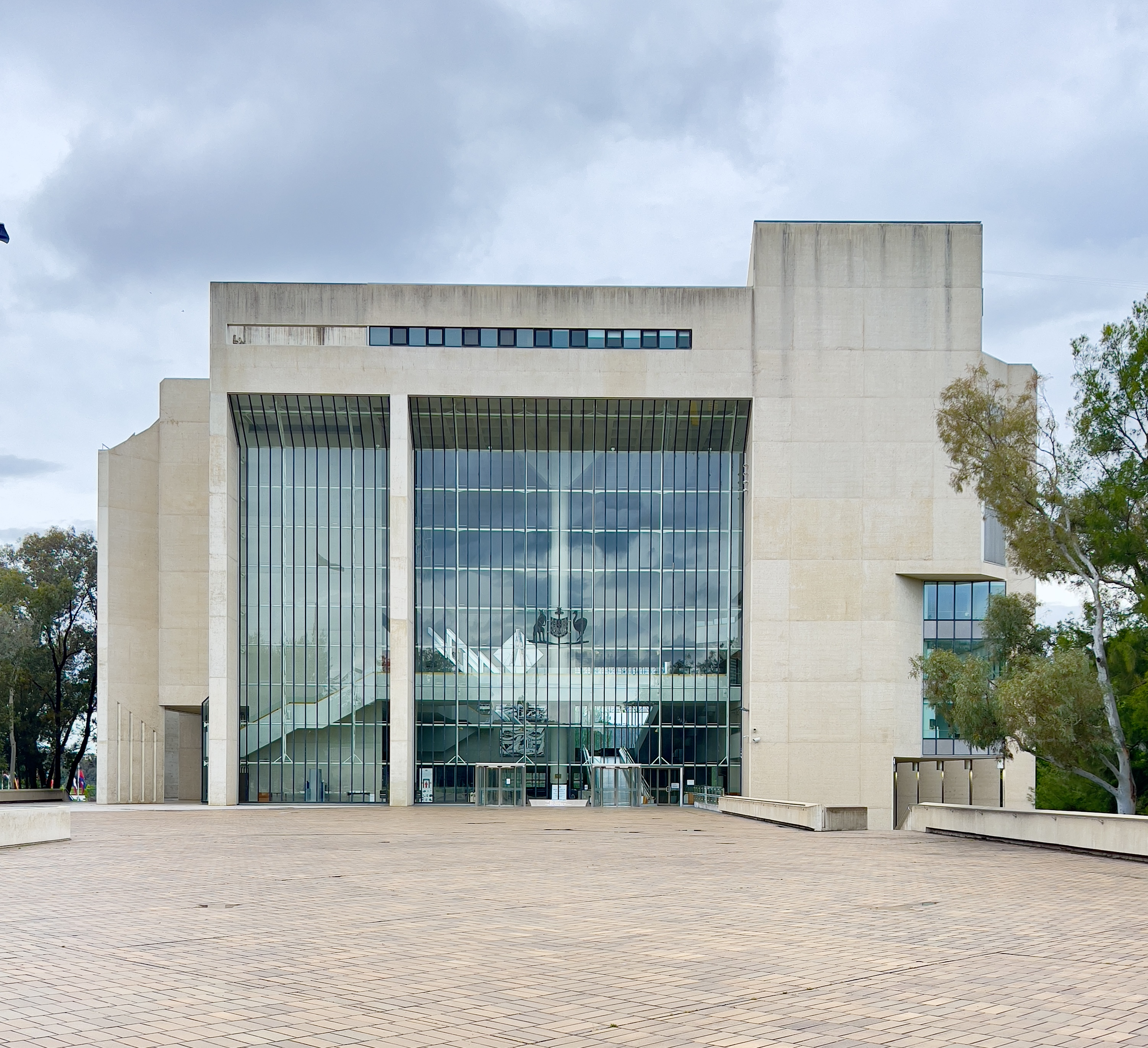
2007 Award, High Court of Australia Building, opened 1980

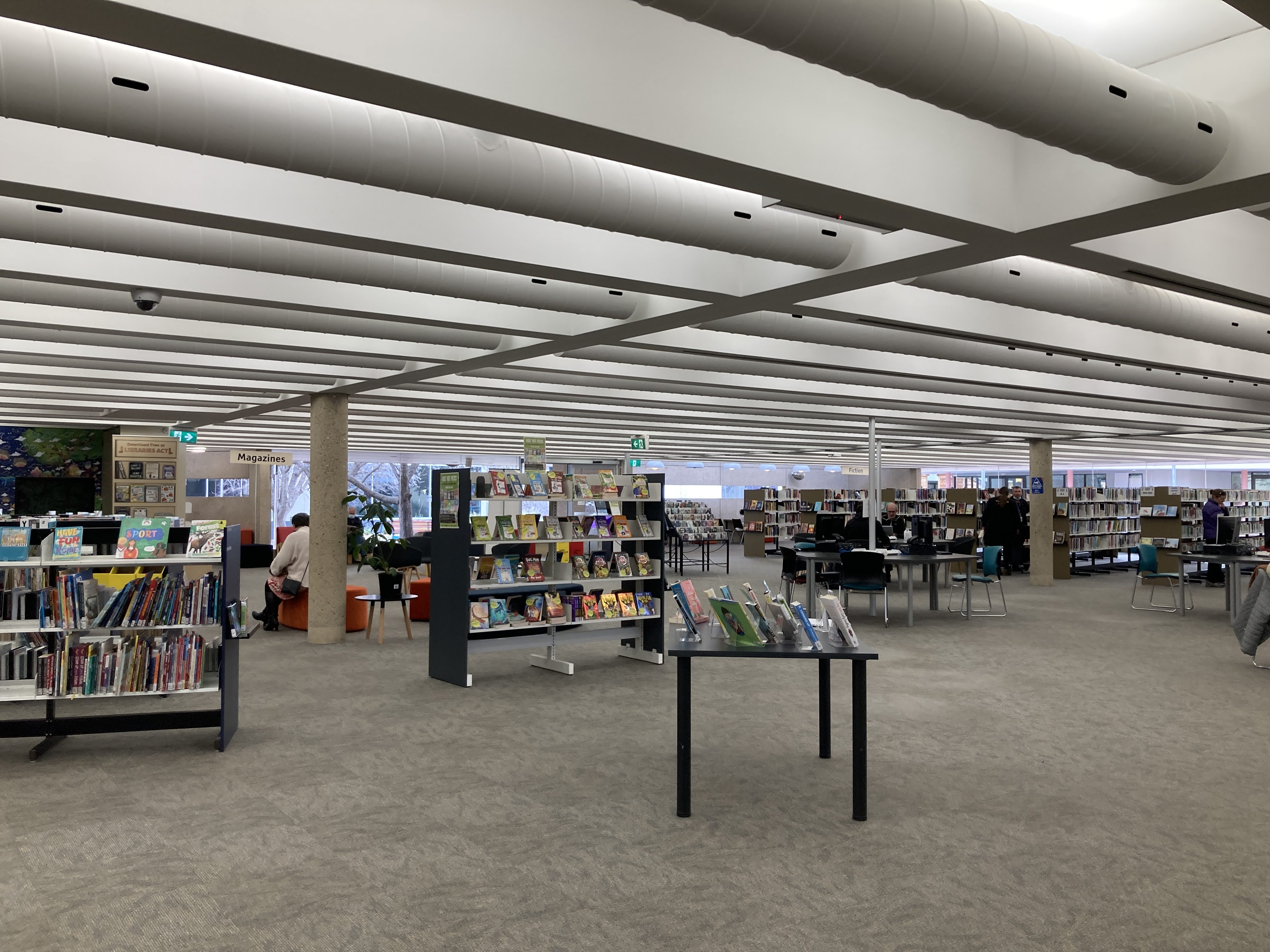
2010 Award, Belconnen Public Library, opened 1981

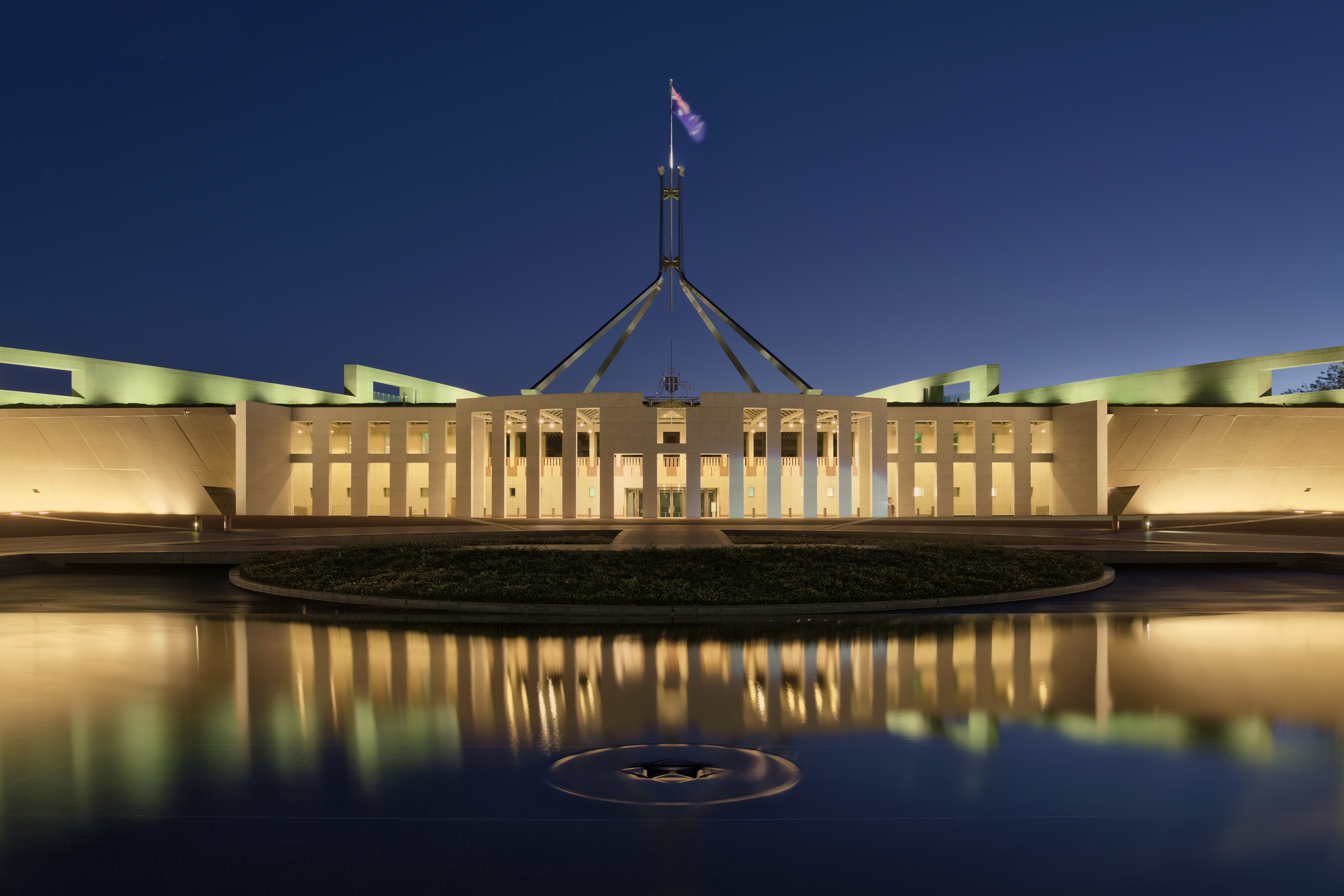
2013 Award, New Australian Parliament House, opened 1988

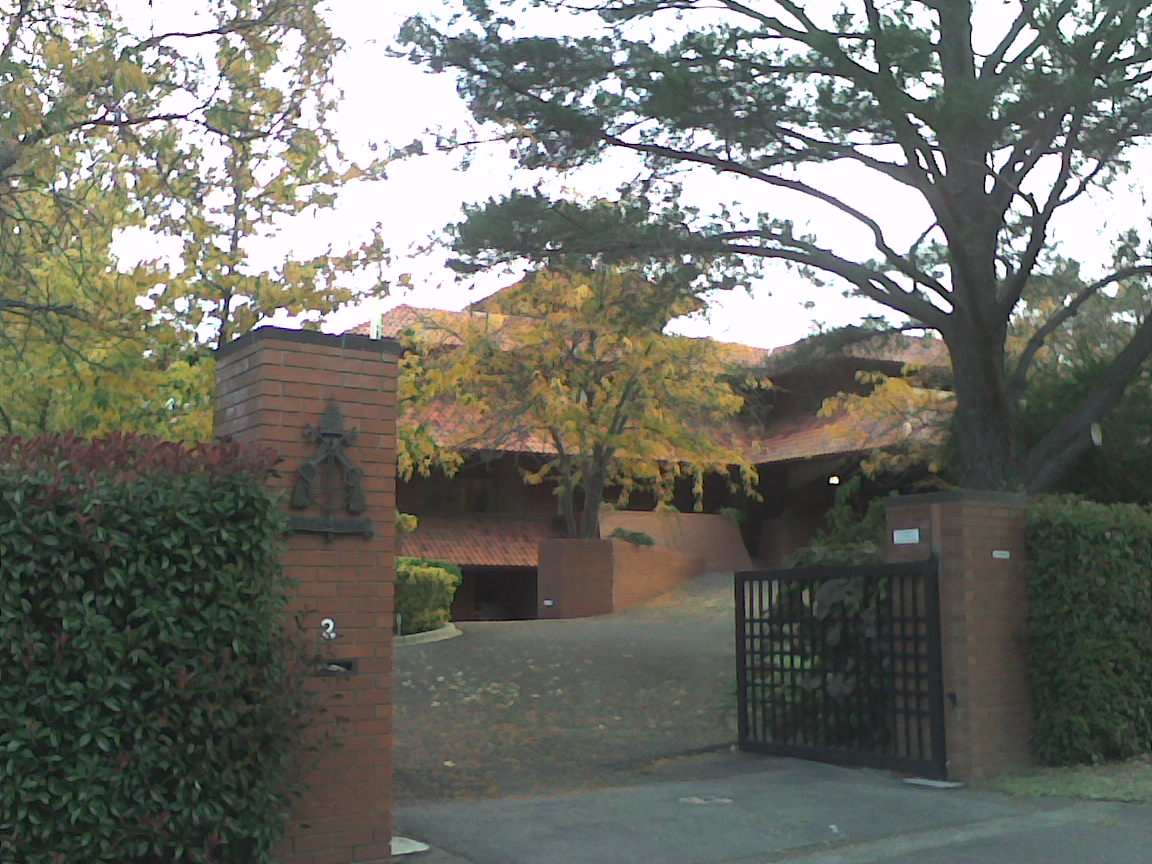
2014 Award, Apostolic Nunciature, built 1977

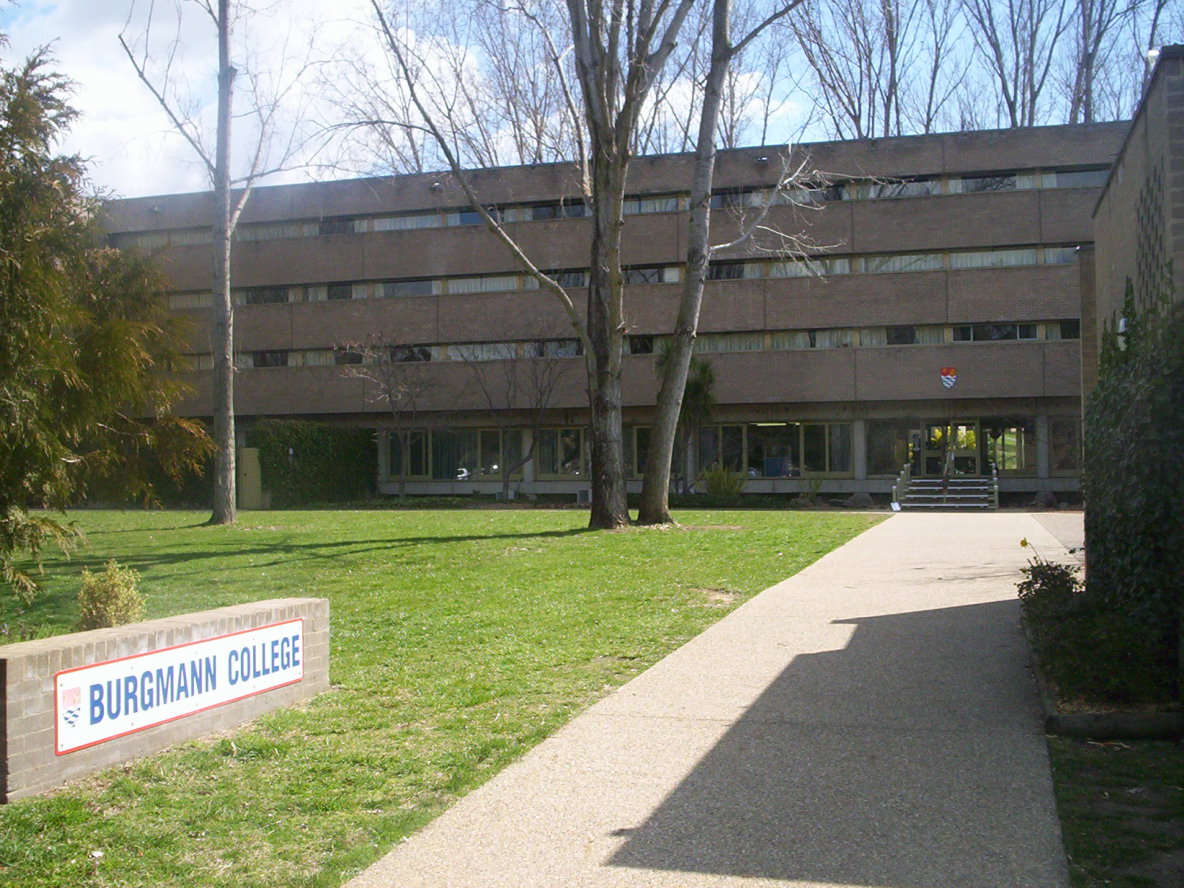
2015 Award, Burgmann College, built 1971

2016 Award, Rivendell, built 1975

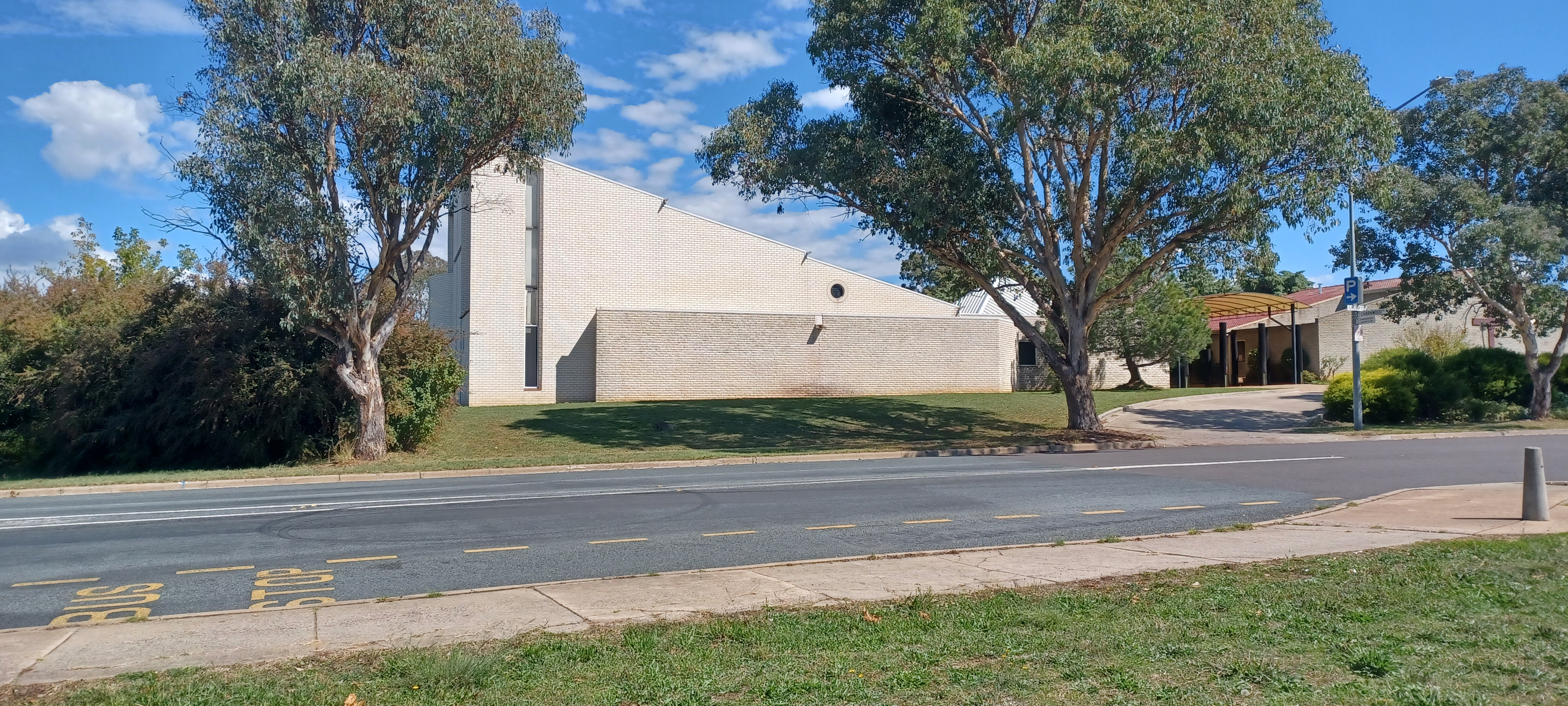
2018 Award, St Thomas Aquinas Catholic Church, built 1989

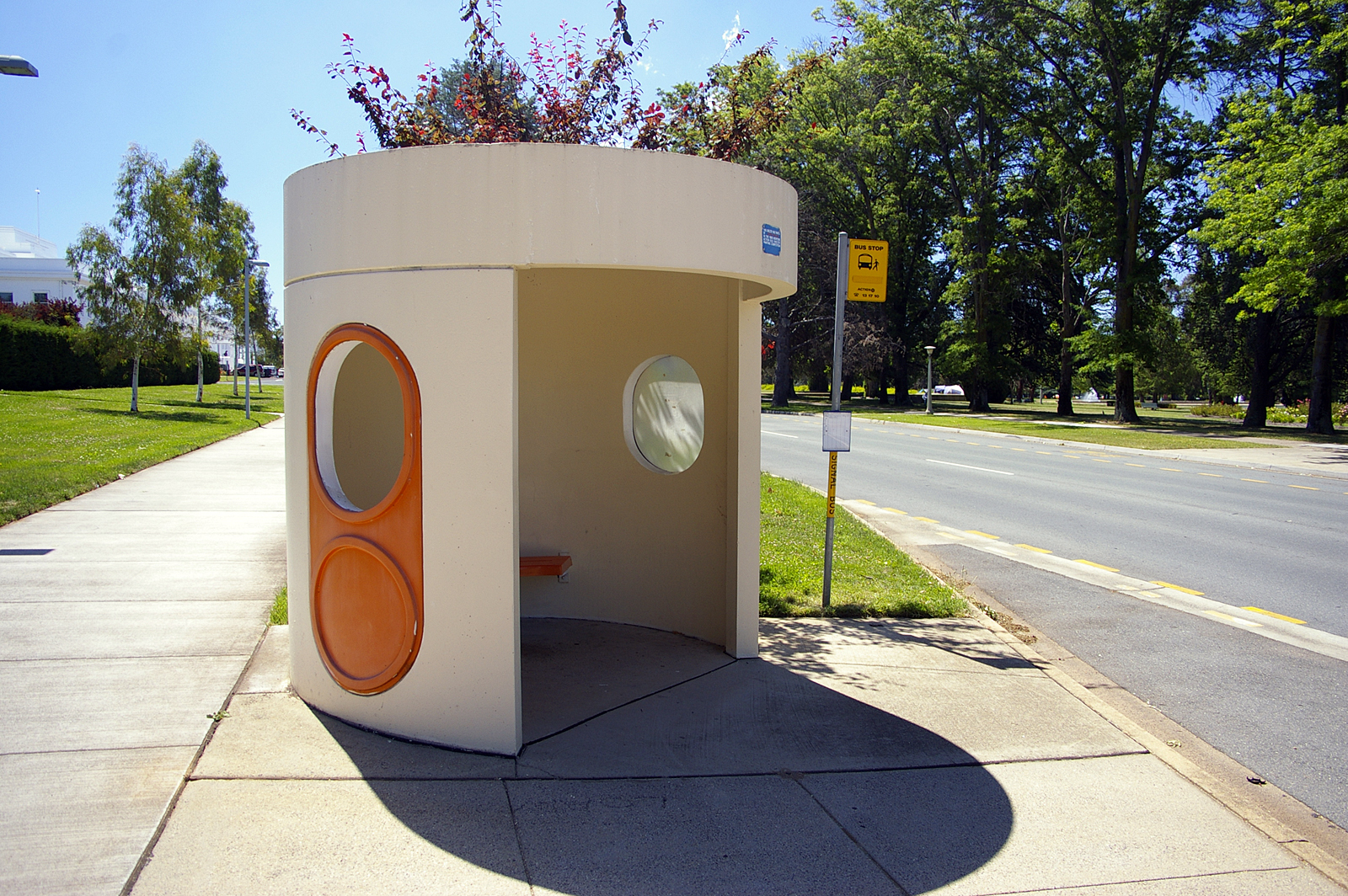
2021 Award, Canberra Concrete Bus Shelters, designed 1974

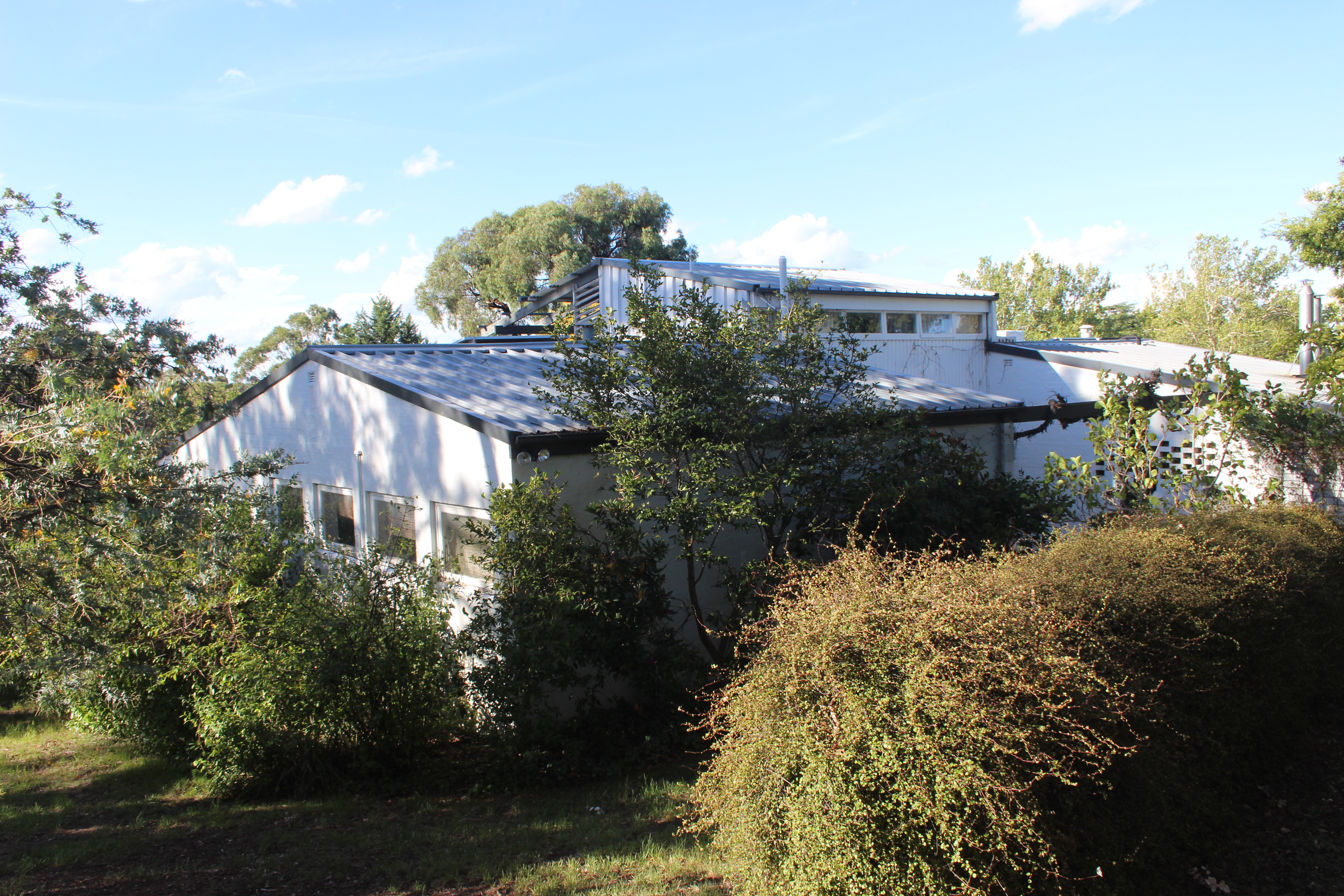
2022 Award, Manning Clark House designed by Robin Boyd, built 1953

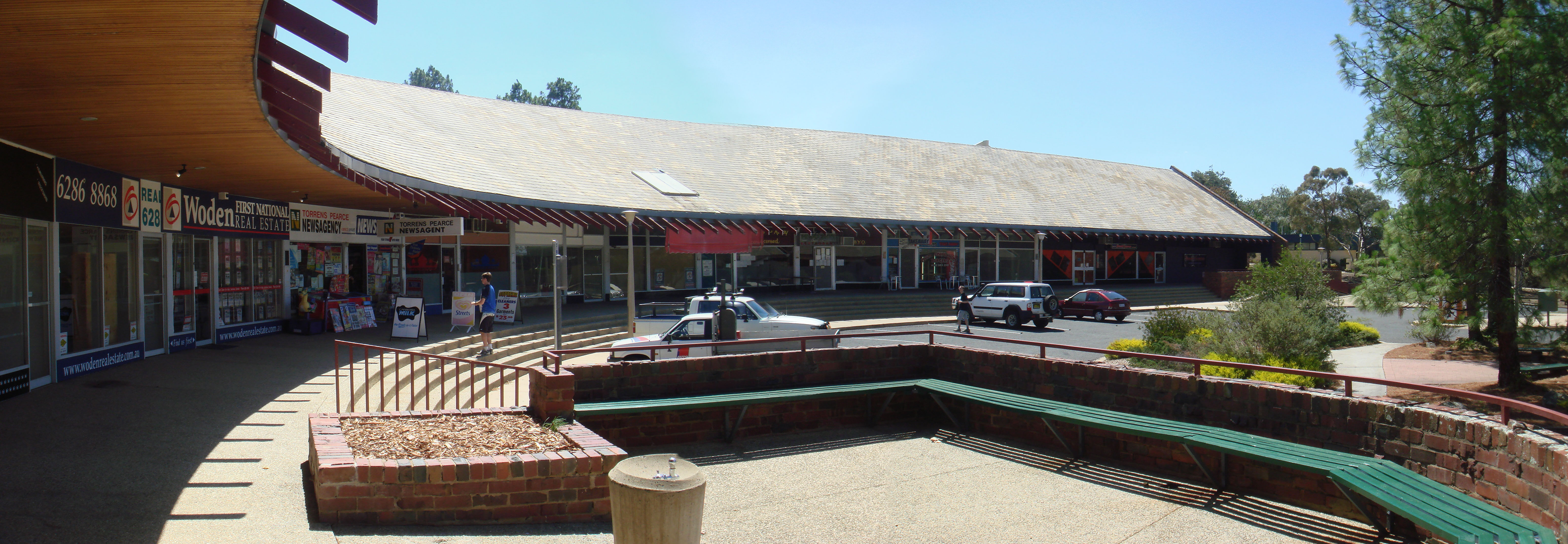
2024 Award, Torrens Neighbourhood Centre designed by Dirk Bolt, built 1967

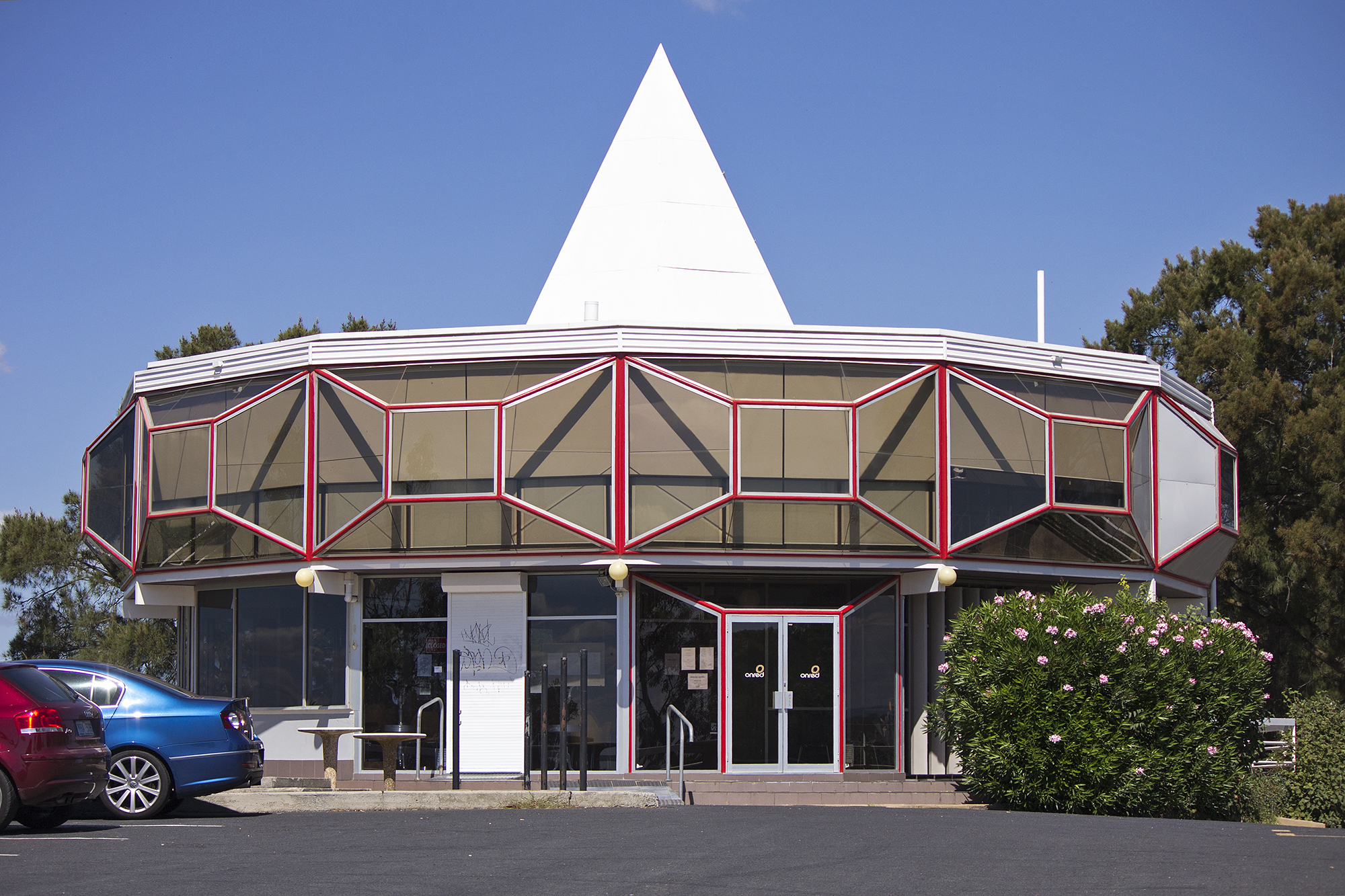
2025 Award, Former Carousel Restaurant, 60 Red Hill Drive by Miles Jalk and Enrico Taglietti, built 1963 (condition in 2013)

2025 Award, Former Carousel Restaurant (condition in 2026 after refurbishment)

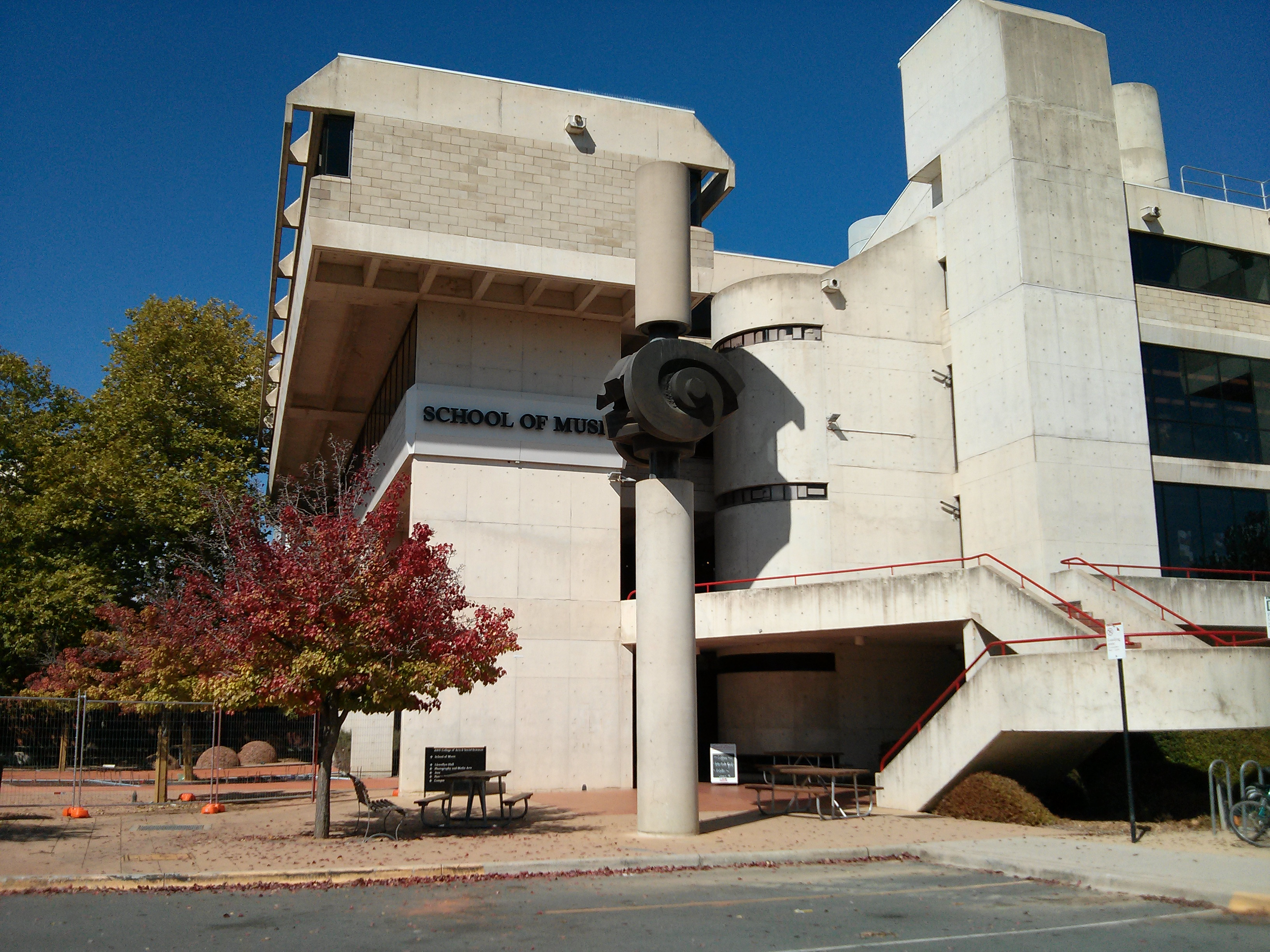
2026 Award, ANU School of Music, designed by Jackson Walker, built 1976

== See also ==
- Australian Institute of Architects Awards and Prizes
- National Award for Enduring Architecture
- New South Wales Enduring Architecture Award
- Maggie Edmond Enduring Architecture Award
- Jack Cheesman Award for Enduring Architecture
- Canberra Medallion
- 25 Year Award (USA)
