= Canberra Medallion =

Annual award for architecture in Australia

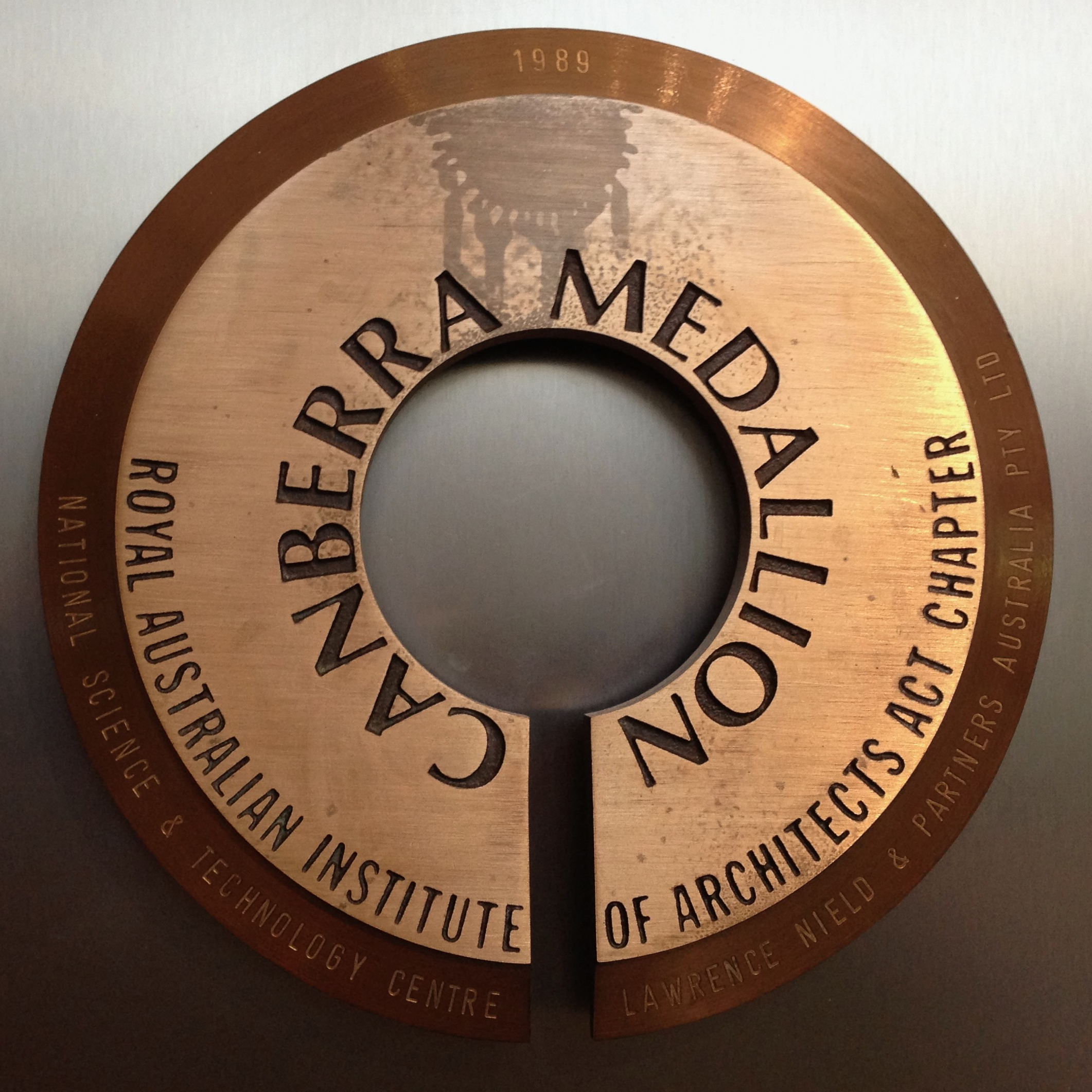
- 1989 Canberra Medallion awarded to Lawrence Neild & Partners
- Awarded for: Highest architectural achievement in Australian Capital Territory
- Country: Australia
- Presented by: Australian Institute of Architects (ACT Chapter)
- First award: 1956; 70 years ago
- Currently held by: Cox Architecture with CK Architecture Australia for Gugan Gulwan, 2026

The Canberra Medallion is an annual architecture award presented by the Australian Capital Territory (ACT) Chapter of the Australian Institute of Architects. It is regarded as the highest award at the annual ACT architecture awards.

== Background ==
Established in 1956, the Canberra Medallion is one of the oldest architecture awards in Australia. Only the Victorian Architecture Medal/Street Architecture Medal (1929) and the NSW Sir John Sulman Medal (1934) are older state based awards for architecture.

=== Early awards and name change ===
Initially the award was known as the Award for Meritorious Architecture by the Canberra Area Committee of the RAIA. In 1962 when the ACT Chapter was established the award was renamed and a bronze medallion to 'equal the prestige of the Sulman Medal' was added. The medallion is named for Australia's capital city, Canberra, located in the Australian Capital Territory, although most winning projects are located in the city not all winners are located in Canberra.

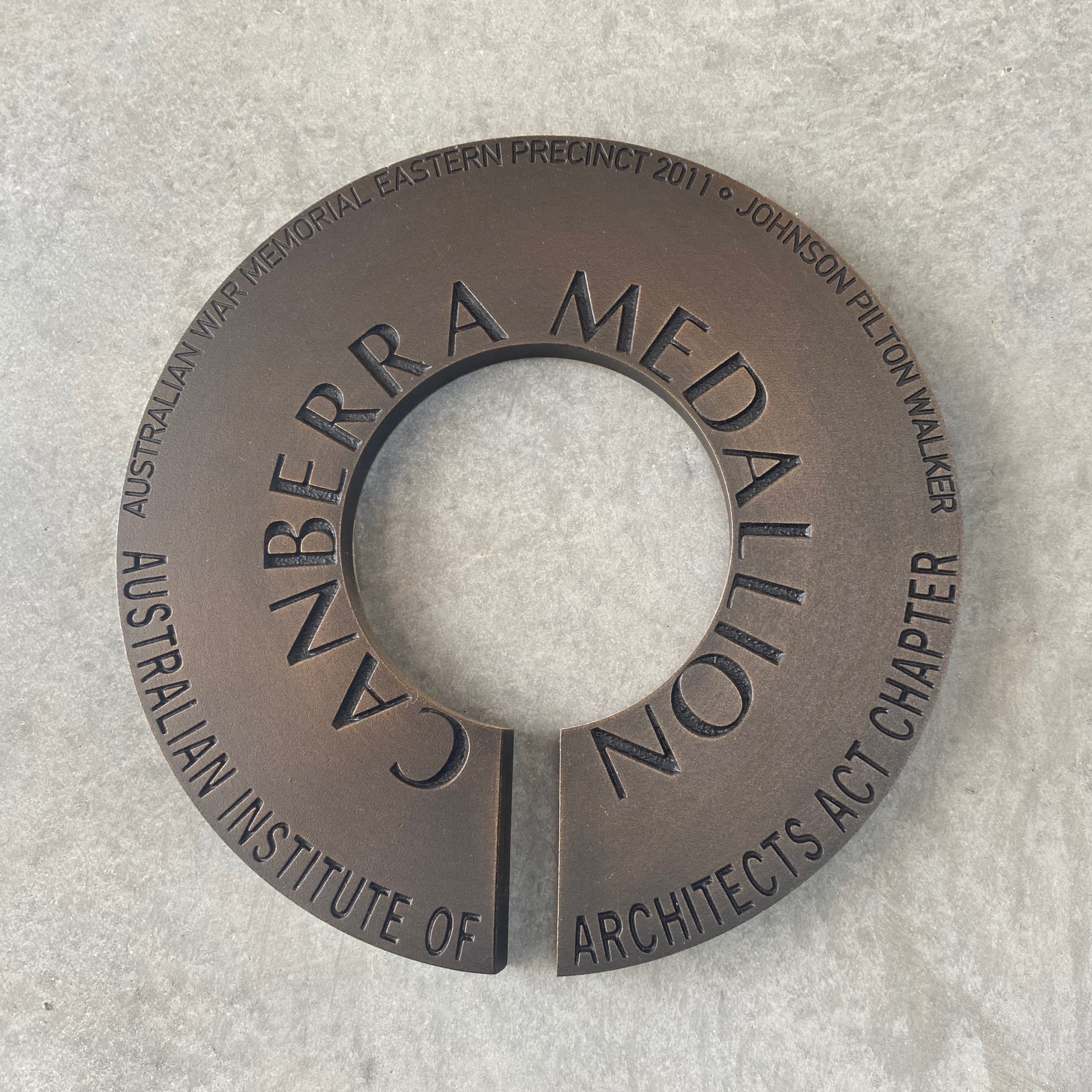
2011 Canberra Medallion, Australian War Memorial

=== Bronze medallion design ===
The medallion was designed by Peter Swalling in 1968 and first presented to the 1968 Canberra Medallion winning project, the Norwood Park Crematorium. The circular style of the medallion has remained the same although materials and finishes have changed over the years.

== Canberra Medallion winners since 2000 ==
ACT Chapter Canberra Medallion winners since 2000 (reverse order)
Year	Architect	Project	Location	State	Type	Other AIA awards
2026	Cox Architecture with CK Architecture Australia	Gugan Gulwan	36 Grattan Court, Wanniassa	Australian Capital Territory	Cultural	Public Architecture Award, 2026 (ACT); W. Hayward Morris Award for Interior Architecture, 2026 (ACT); Connection to Country Narrative Prize, 2026 (ACT); Pamille Berg Prize for Art in Architecture, 2026 (ACT); People’s Choice Award, 2026 (ACT)
2025	Stewart Architecture	Daramalan College Performing Arts Centre	121 Cowper Street, Dickson	Australian Capital Territory	Education	Enrico Taglietti Award for Educational Architecture, 2025 (ACT); Award for Interior Architecture, 2025 (ACT); EmAGN Project Award, 2025 (ACT)
2024	Joanna Nelson Architect	House on a Path	Canberra	Australian Capital Territory	Residential	Gene Willsford Award for Residential Architecture – Houses (Alterations and Additions), 2024 (ACT)
2023	Bates Smart	Brindabella	6 Brindabella Circuit, Canberra Airport	Australian Capital Territory	Commercial	John Andrews Award for Commercial Architecture, 2023 (ACT)
2022	Hassell	Birch Building Refurbishment	Australian National University, 35 Science Road, Acton, Canberra	Australian Capital Territory	Education	National Award for Heritage, 2022; National Award for Educational Architecture, 2022; National Commendation for Interior Architecture, 2022; Enrico Taglietti Award for Educational Architecture, 2022 (ACT); W Hayward Morris Award for Interior Architecture, 2022 (ACT); J S Murdoch Award for Heritage, 2022 (ACT)
2021	Anthony Knobel	House for Hiroko	Canberra	Australian Capital Territory	Residential	Malcolm Moir and Heather Sutherland Award for Residential Architecture, Houses (New), 2021 (ACT)
2020	Edition Office and Daniel Boyd	For Our Country	Australian War Memorial, Canberra	Australian Capital Territory	War Memorial	Nicholas Murcutt Award for Small Project Architecture, 2020; Cynthia Breheny Award for Small Project Architecture (ACT); Pamille Berg Award for Art in Architecture (ACT); Robert Foster Award for Light in Architecture (ACT)
2019	Austin Maynard Architects	Empire	Canberra	Australian Capital Territory	Residential	Gene Willsford Award for Residential Architecture – Houses (Alterations and Additions), 2019 (ACT); National Commendation for Residential Architecture – Houses (Alterations and Additions), 2019
2018	Hassell	Australian Federal Police Forensics and Data Centre, Majura	1 Tambreet Street, Majura	Australian Capital Territory	Government	National Commendation for Commercial Architecture, 2018
2017	National Capital Authority, Jane Irwin, Hill Thalis, SMEC and AECOM	Constitution Avenue Streetscape	Constitution Avenue, Canberra	Australian Capital Territory	Urban Design	Sir John Overall Award for Urban Design, 2017 (ACT)
2016	lahznimmo	Bowen Place Crossing	Bowen Place & Kings Avenue, Parkes, Canberra	Australian Capital Territory	Urban Design	Walter Burley Griffin Award for Urban Design, 2016 (National); Sir John Overall Award for Urban Design, 2016 (ACT)
2015	Fender Katsalidis	New Acton Precinct	Acton, Canberra	Australian Capital Territory	Mixed Use	Walter Burley Griffin Award for Urban Design, 2015 (National); Sir John Overall Award for Urban Design, 2015 (ACT); Award for Sustainable Architecture, 2015 (ACT); Award for Interior Architecture, 2015 (ACT)
2014	Tonkin Zulaikha Greer and Taylor Cullity Lethlean	National Arboretum	Forest Drive, Canberra	Australian Capital Territory	Cultural	Sir John Overall Award for Urban Design, 2014
2013	Fender Katsalidis	2 & 4 National Circuit	2 & 4 National Circuit, Canberra	Australian Capital Territory	Commercial	Sir John Overall Award for Urban Design, 2013
2012	Collins Caddaye	St Gregory's Hall	St. Gregory's Primary School (MacQuoid Street Campus), Molonglo Street, Queanbeyan	Australian Capital Territory	Education	Romaldo Giurgola Award for Public Architecture, 2012
2011	Johnson Pilton Walker	Australian War Memorial Eastern Precinct	Australian War Memorial, Canberra	Australian Capital Territory	War Memorial	Sir Zelman Cowen Award for Public Architecture, 2011 (National); Romaldo Giurgola Award for Public Architecture, 2011 (ACT)
2010	Nino Bellantonio, AIL Studio & Joanna Nelson	H House	20 Blackbutt Street, O’Connor	Australian Capital Territory	Residential	Small Project Award, 2010 (ACT)
2009	Johnson Pilton Walker	National Portrait Gallery	King Edward Terrace, Parkes, Canberra	Australian Capital Territory	Cultural	Sir Zelman Cowen Award for Public Architecture, 2009 (National); Architecture Award for Interior Architecture, 2009 (National); Romaldo Giurgola Award for Public Architecture, 2009 (ACT); Light in Architecture Prize, 2009 (ACT)
2008	Fender Katsalidis	New Acton East	Corner of Marcus Clarke Street & Edinburgh Avenue, Acton, Canberra	Australian Capital Territory	Mixed Use/Commercial	National Award for Commercial Architecture, 2008
2007	Cox Humphries Moss	Australian Institute of Sport Aquatic Testing and Training Centre	26 Leverrier Street, Bruce, Canberra	Australian Capital Territory	Sport	Award for Public Architecture, 2007 (ACT)
2007	Bligh Voller Nield	ANU Medical School	Canberra Hospital, Garran	Australian Capital Territory	Health	
2006	Roger Pegrum	Reid House	19 Euree Street, Reid, Canberra	Australian Capital Territory	Residential	
2005	Denton Corker Marshall	ANZAC Hall	Australian War Memorial, Campbell, Canberra	Australian Capital Territory	War Memorial	Sir Zelman Cowen Award for Public Architecture, 2005
2004	No Award					
2003	No Award					
2002	Cox Humphries Moss (Rodney Moss)	Clynes House (Catherine & Robert Clynes)	Yarralumla, Canberra	Australian Capital Territory	Residential	
2002	Woods Bagot	Australian Bureau of Statistics (ABS House)	45 Benjamin Way, Belconnen	Australian Capital Territory	Commercial	
2001	Mitchell Giurgola & Thorp	Australian War Memorial Gallery Redevelopment	Australian War Memorial, Campbell Canberra	Australian Capital Territory	War Memorial	
2000	Daryl Jackson Alastair Swayn	CSIRO Discovery Centre	North Science Road, Acton, Canberra	Australian Capital Territory	Commercial	
2000	Dawson Brown Architecture (now Casey Brown Architecture)	Sastrugi Lodge	12 Diggings Terace, Thredbo	New South Wales	Residential	Redevelopment of 1958 lodge by Otto Ernegg and Eric Nicholls.

== Canberra Medallion winners 1956—1999 ==
ACT Chapter Canberra Medallion winners from 1956 to 1999 (reverse order)
Year	Architect	Project	Location	State	Type	Other AIA awards
1999	Mitchell/Giurgola & Thorp	Blake Dawson Waldron Fit-out	12 Moore Street, Canberra	Australian Capital Territory	Commercial	
1999	Townsend & Associates	Fowler House	288 Duffy Street, Ainslie	Australian Capital Territory	Residential	
1999	Simon Kringas	Jenkins Farmhouse		Australian Capital Territory	Residential	
1999	Daryl Jackson Alastair Swayn	Capital Jet Facility	Boomerang Street, Canberra Airport, Pialligo	Australian Capital Territory	Commercial	
1998	Munns Sly Scott–Bohanna Moss	Hyson Green, Calvary Hospital	Mary Potter Circuit, Bruce	Australian Capital Territory	Health	
1997	Graeme Trickett	Robert Morrison House (Alterations & Additions)	52 Beauchamp Street, Deakin	Australian Capital Territory	Residential	
1997	Eggleston Macdonald	Australian Geographical Survey Organisation HQ	Symonston	Australian Capital Territory	Commercial	
1997	Daryl Jackson Alastair Swayn	AIS Ansett Sports Visitor Centre	Leverriar Crescent, Bruce	Australian Capital Territory	Sport	
1997	MCC Architects (consortium of Munns Sly Scott–Bohanna Moss, Collins Caddaye Humphries and Colin Stewart)	ACT Magistrates Court	London Circuit, Canberra	Australian Capital Territory	Justice	
1996	Mitchell/Giurgola & Thorp	ACT Legislative Assembly	Civic Square, Canberra	Australian Capital Territory	Government	
1996	Freeman Collett & Partners	My Cafe	Franklin Street, Manuka	Australian Capital Territory	Commercial	
1996	Shane Blue & Rachel Bourne	House at Fadden Hills	10 Decker Place, Fadden	Australian Capital Territory	Residential	
1995	No Award					
1994	Mitchell/Giurgola & Thorp	Ainslie Fire Station	Wakefield Avenue, Ainslie	Australian Capital Territory	Public	
1994	Australian Construction Services	Therapeutic Goods Administration Building	Narrabundah Lane, Symonston	Australian Capital Territory	Commercial	
1994	Clarke & Jackson	Ainslie Village Redevelopment	Quick Street, Ainslie	Australian Capital Territory	Commercial	
1993	Daryl Jackson Alastair Swayn	Boiler House Lecture Theatre	University of Canberra, Bruce	Australian Capital Territory	Education	
1992	Mitchell/Giurgola & Thorp	Faculty of Information Sciences & Engineering Building	University of Canberra, Bruce	Australian Capital Territory	Education	
1991	Daryl Jackson Alastair Swayn	Athletics Field Grandstand	Australian Institute of Sport, Masterman Street, Bruce	Australian Capital Territory	Sport	
1990	Mitchell/Giurgola & Thorp	St Thomas Aquinas Parish Church	Lhotsky Street, Charnwood	Australian Capital Territory	Religion	Sir Roy Grounds Award for Enduring Architecture, 2018
1989	Lawrence Nield & Partners	National Science & Technology Centre (now Questacon)	King Edward Terrace, Parkes	Australian Capital Territory	Cultural	
1988	Mitchell/Giurgola & Thorp	Australian Parliament House	Parliament Drive, Capital Hill	Australian Capital Territory	Cultural	National Award for Enduring Architecture, 2013; Sir Roy Grounds Award for Enduring Architecture, 2013; Sir Zelman Cowen Award for Public Architecture, 1989
1988	Ken Maher & Partners	Psychiatric Hostel	Mary Potter Circuit, Bruce	Australian Capital Territory	Health	
1987	Daryl Jackson	Indoor Sports Centre	Australian Defence Force Academy, Fairbairn Ave, Campbell	Australian Capital Territory	Sport	
1986	Department of Housing & Construction (ACT) with Ancher Mortlock & Woolley	Cadets Mess	Australian Defence Force Academy, Fairbairn Avenue, Campbell	Australian Capital Territory	Defence	Sir Zelman Cowen Award for Public Architecture, 1986
1985	Daryl Jackson	Singapore High Commission Chancery	Forster Crescent, Yarralumla	Australian Capital Territory	Government	
1984	Daryl Jackson	National Sports Centre Swimming Halls	Australian Institute of Sport, Leverrier Crescent, Bruce	Australian Capital Territory	Sport	Sir Zelman Cowen Award for Public Architecture, 1984; RAIA National Award for Design Excellence
1984	Peter Freeman	Hill Station Addition	51 Sheppard Street, Hume	Australian Capital Territory	Heritage	Shortlisted for Lachlan Macquarie Award, 1984 (National)
1983	Edwards, Madigan, Torzillo and Briggs	Australian National Gallery	Parkes	Australian Capital Territory	Cultural	
1982	Robin Gibson	Belconnen Library	Chandler Street, Belconnen	Australian Capital Territory	Cultural	CS Daley Medal (ACT)
1981	Daryl Jackson Evan Walker Architects	Canberra School of Art (now Australian National University School of Art and Design)	Australian National University, Ellery Crescent, Acton	Australian Capital Territory	Education	Sir Zelman Cowen Award for Public Architecture, 1981 (National); CS Daley Medal (ACT)
1980	Edwards, Madigan, Torzillo & Briggs	High Court of Australia Building	Parkes Place, Parkes	Australian Capital Territory	Justice	National Award for Enduring Architecture, 2007; Sir Roy Grounds Award for Enduring Architecture, 2007
1979	Department of Housing & Construction (Michael Adams)	Taylor Primary School	Marconi Crescent, Kambah	Australian Capital Territory	Education	
1978	Philip Cox & Partners	Kambah Health Centre	Jenke Circuit, Kambah	Australian Capital Territory	Health	
1977	Enrico Taglietti	Giralang Primary School	Atalumba Close, Giralang	Australian Capital Territory	Education	
1976	No Award					
1975	No Award					
1974	No Award					
1973	No Award					
1972	Hancock, Renfree and Associates	Grandstand Amenities Pavilion	Randwick Road, Mitchell	Australian Capital Territory	Sport	
1971	Collard, Clark and Jackson	Russell 14 (now Defence R8 Building)	Russell Offices, Kelliher Drive, Russell	Australian Capital Territory	Defence	
1970	Ian McKay and Partners	Food Services Building	Bowes Street, Phillip	Australian Capital Territory	Commercial	
1969	No Award					
1968	Rosman, Hastings & Sorel (Peter Sorel)	Norwood Park Crematorium	65 Sandford Street, Mitchell	Australian Capital Territory	Cultural	
1967	Fowell, Mansfield, Jarvis & Maclurcan	Commonwealth Club	25 Forster Crescent, Yarralumla	Australian Capital Territory	Cultural	
1966	No Award					
1965	Allen, Jack and Cottier (Russell Jack)	Cater House	145 Mugga Way, Red Hill	Australian Capital Territory	Residential	Meritorious Architecture Award, 1965
1964	Mockridge, Stahle and Mitchell	Downer Primary School (1962–1988)	Bradfield Street, Downer	Australian Capital Territory	Education	(demolished 2014)
1963	No Award					
1962	McConnel, Smith and Johnson (Peter Keys)	Mackie House	41 National Circuit, Forrest	Australian Capital Territory	Residential	
1961	Roy Grounds of Grounds, Romberg and Boyd	Australian Academy of Science (The Shine Dome, formerly Becker House)	Gordon Street, Acton	Australian Capital Territory	Government	Sir John Sulman Medal, 1959; Meritorious Architecture Award, ACT, 1959; 25 Year Award, 2001
1960	No Award					
1959	No Award					
1958	No Award					
1957	No Award					
1956	Robin Boyd	Fenner House	8 Monaro Crescent & 1 Torres Street, Red Hill	Australian Capital Territory	Residential	Meritorious Architecture Award, ACT, 1956

Note: Prior to 1967 the Canberra Medallion was known as the ACT Meritorious Architecture Award.

== See also ==
- Australian Institute of Architects Awards and Prizes
- Australian Institute of Architects
- Sir Roy Grounds Award for Enduring Architecture
- Sir Zelman Cowen Award for Public Architecture
- Victorian Architecture Medal
