= Concrete bus shelters in Canberra =

Municipal infrastructure in Canberra, Australia

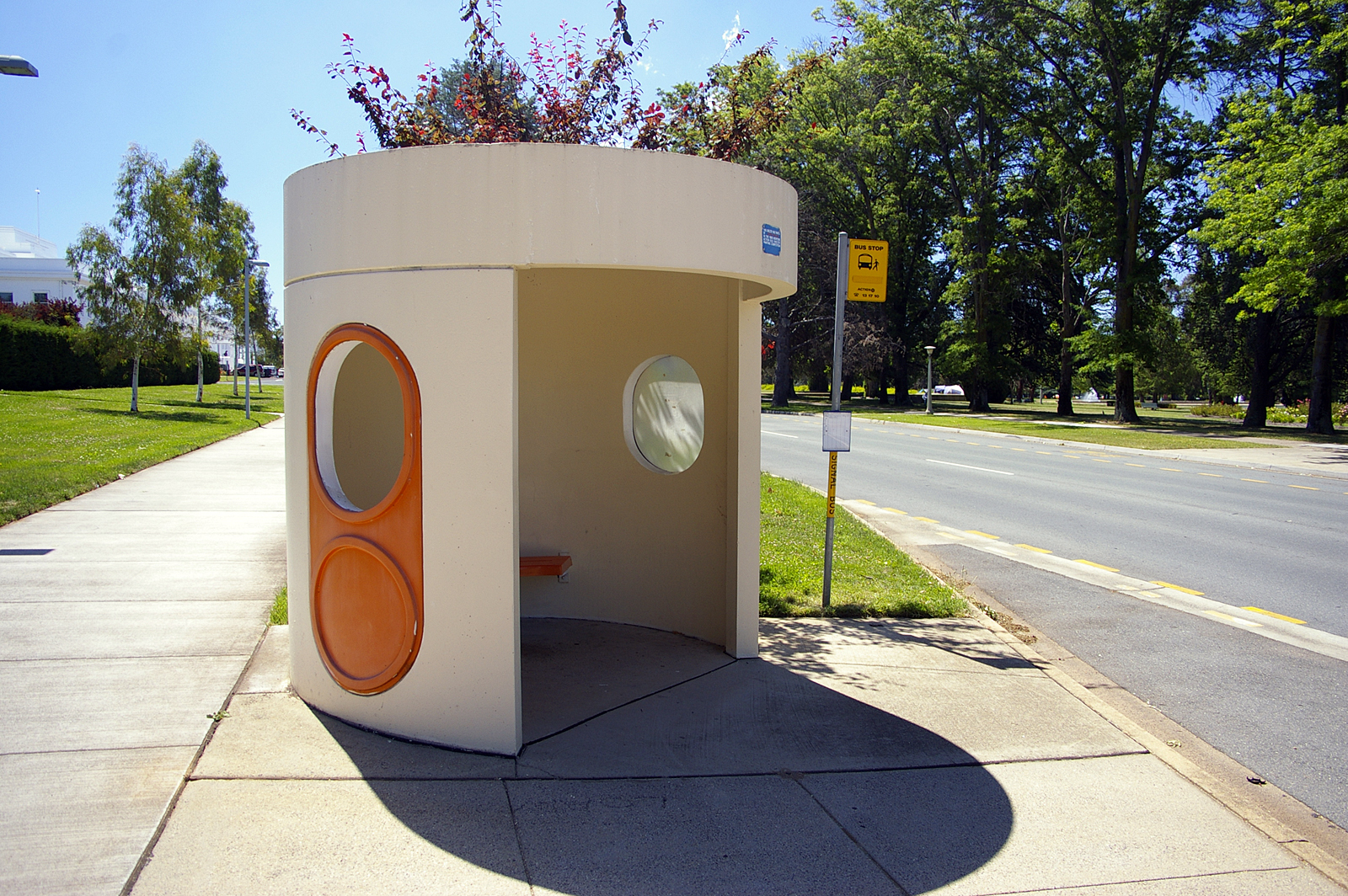
One of the concrete bus shelters, located near Old Parliament House

Concrete bus shelters are considered an icon of Australia's capital city Canberra. Installation of the cylindrical bus shelters began in 1975 and continued into the early 1990s. At least 477 were purchased, of which 455 remained in use by ACTION buses as of 2016.

The bus shelters were designed by the architect Clem Cummings for the National Capital Development Commission. They are an example of brutalist architecture and have proven to be hard wearing. Problems with their windows and a lack of lighting make them uncomfortable to use at times. Several variants of the design were developed, and some were installed in other cities.

While the bus shelters initially received a mixed response from the public, they are now well regarded. The shelters have been the subject of artwork and have been reproduced in the form of earrings and tattoos. Owing to their functionality and popularity, shelters are relocated to newly established suburbs when bus stops are closed. The shelters were heritage listed in 2026.

== Design ==
The bus shelters were designed in 1974 for the National Capital Development Commission by the architect Clem Cummings. Cummings' design was for a cylindrical shelter made from concrete, with window frames on each side and a bench made from fibreglass. The windows were made from Lexan. ArchivesACT has stated that the design is an example of brutalist architecture.

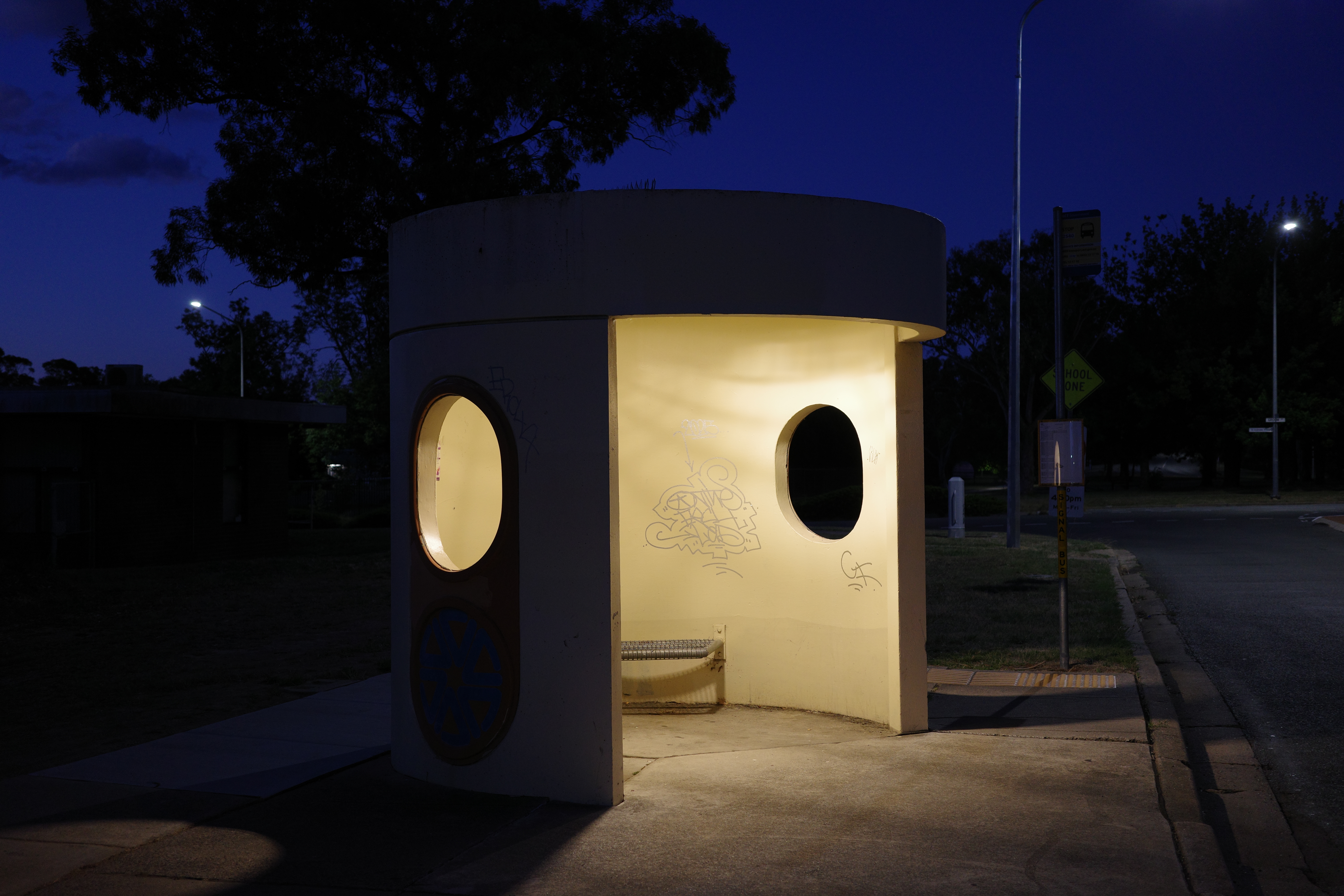
A bus shelter fitted with lighting in Hughes

Various minor amendments were made to the design after the first series was installed; for instance, "Series II" shelters had a precast concrete floor and no backrest for the bench. The Series II shelters located near schools did not have a bench. At least five different series were produced. A design for a windowless variant of the shelters was developed in the 1970s, but none were produced. Since they were first installed, the shelters have been painted cream colour, and their fibreglass window frames and benches have been orange.

The shelters' Lexan windows proved to be a weak point. They were easily damaged by vandals, and could be pushed out of their frames or burnt. The ACT Transport Branch experimented with a different type of Lexan, but it also proved unsatisfactory. Consideration was given to using wire glass, but this option was rejected after glaziers advised the government that such windows would be more dangerous than Lexan if they were shattered. Efforts to replace damaged windows were eventually abandoned, and many of the shelters are now windowless. This has led to complaints about the shelters being cold and drafty.

Lighting was not originally installed in any of the concrete bus shelters. This led to a perception that they were unsafe at night. During 2021 the ACT Government added solar-powered lights to two of the shelters in the suburb of Mitchell as a trial. A further 31 shelters were fitted with lighting in 2023. Work to install lighting in 28 more concrete and glass bus shelters began in July 2026, with the ACT Government stating that this is part of a program of progressively modifying bus shelters in this way.

== History ==
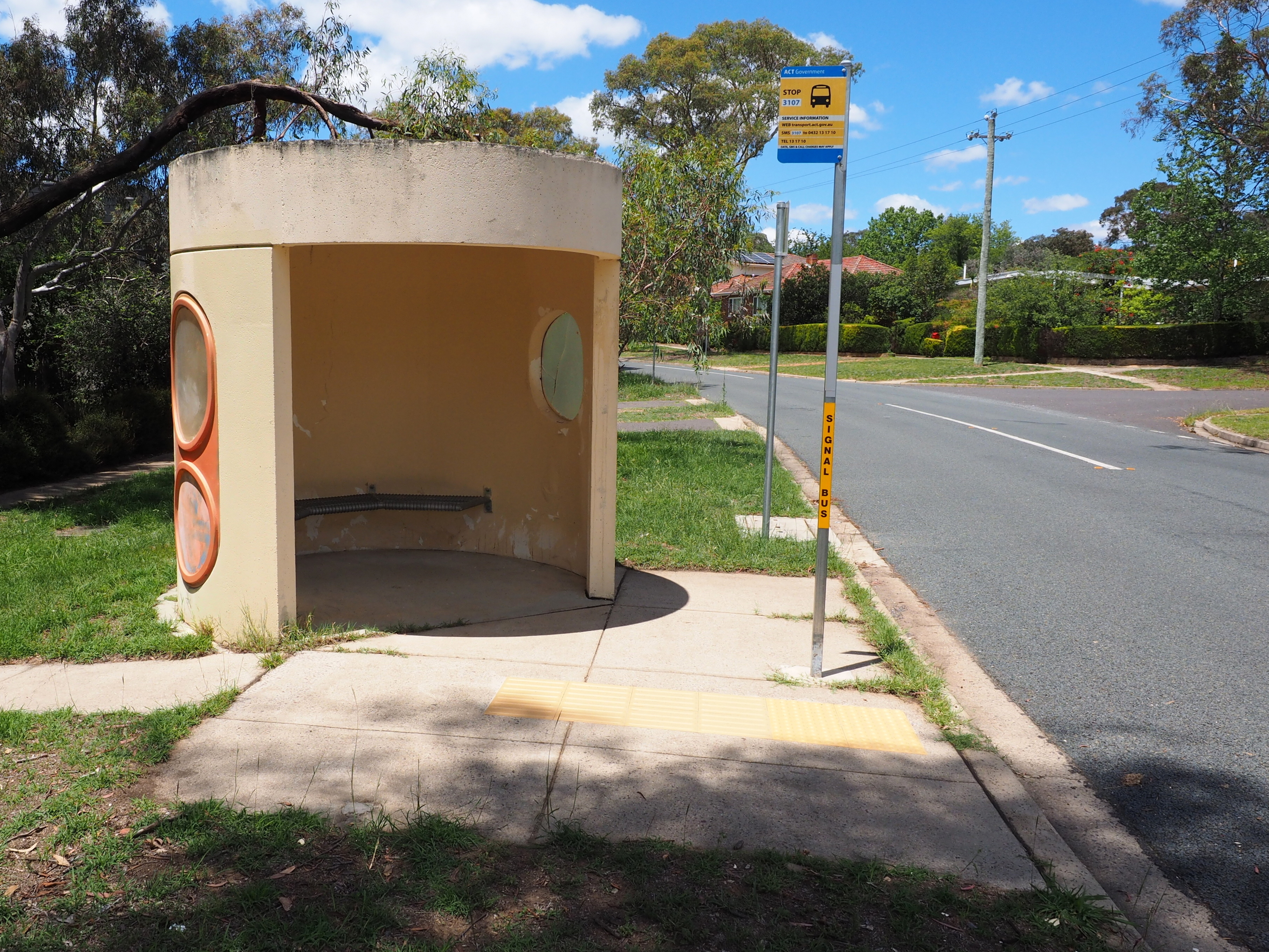
A typical suburban bus stop with a concrete shelter in 2018. The shelter is angled so it faces towards oncoming buses. Unusually, this shelter retains both of its Lexan windows, but its fibreglass bench has been replaced with a wire bench.

The first 98 "Series I" shelters were installed during 1975 as part of a broader project to upgrade Canberra's bus network. At this time it was intended that the shelters would eventually be installed at almost all bus stops in the city. Another 207 shelters were installed between the 1976–77 and 1979–80 financial years. Shelters continued to be sporadically purchased and installed during the 1980s and early 1990s. By the time construction was complete, at least 477 shelters had been installed. Bus shelters installed in Canberra since the early 1990s have been made from steel and glass.

During the 1980s and 1990s, murals were painted inside some of the bus shelters by school children and community groups; this effort was sponsored by ACTION as a way of discouraging vandalism and promoting community art. ACTION ran an annual mural painting competition between 1987 and at least 1992. By 1992, murals had been painted inside about 200 bus shelters. Transport Canberra continues to grant permission for shelters to be painted on a one-off basis.

As of 2016, 455 of the concrete bus shelters remained in use. A total of 64 of the shelters were relocated after 2007 when they were replaced with glass shelters which include advertising. Other shelters were relocated in the mid-2010s when ACTION's bus stops were upgraded to improve their accessibility for people with disability.

The ACT government intends to retain the shelters for as long as possible. The director of Capital Works at Transport Canberra and City Services told the Australian Broadcasting Corporation in 2016 that "they just last forever because of the material they're made out of, [and] the way they're designed". Bus shelters at stops which are no longer serviced due to route changes continue to be relocated elsewhere, including to newly-established suburbs.

Several concrete bus shelters built to Cummings' design have been installed outside of Canberra. Locations with the shelters include Bredbo, Burradoo, Goulburn, Maitland and Tallong in New South Wales as well as Surfers Paradise and Tugun in Queensland. Two of the shelters in Surfers Paradise have been converted into public toilets.

During the 2024 Australian Capital Territory election the ACT Greens promised to build approximately 200 new concrete bus shelters if they were elected to government. The party argued that the design was better suited to Canberra's climate than glass bus shelters and could be decorated through community art projects.

== Iconic status ==
Canberrans' views on the bus shelters were initially mixed. A 1976 National Capital Development Commission paper noted that the bus shelters had been "generally ... well received". However, The Canberra Times received letters which were critical of the design and one of its journalists, Shirley Despoja, labelled them "lunatic". In 1990 the local politician Bill Wood, who was advocating to retain the remaining timber bus shelters, labelled the concrete shelters "quite undesirable".

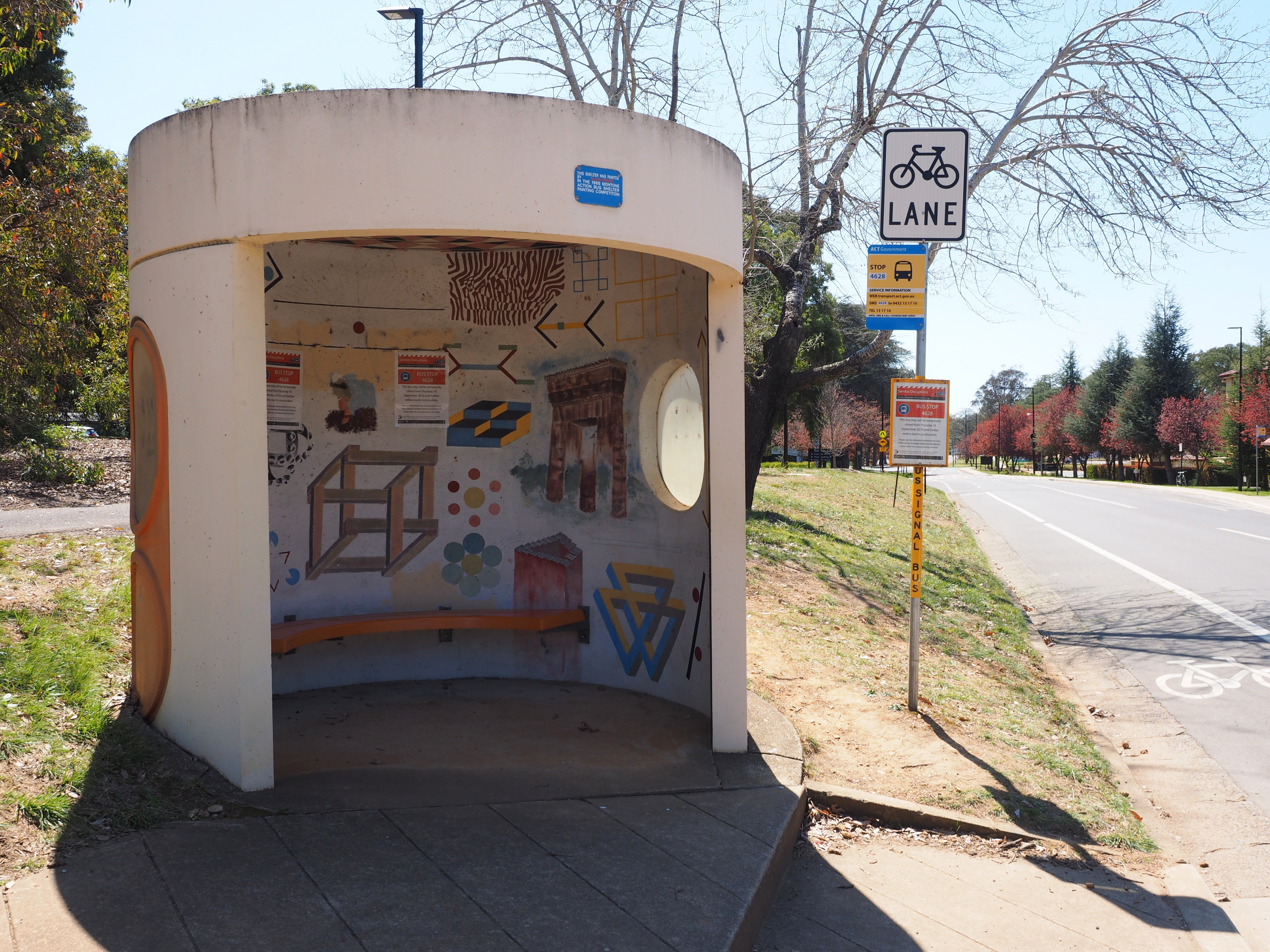
A bus shelter decorated with paintings at the Australian National University

The bus shelters are now well regarded. ArchivesACT has written that "over the years, the concrete shelters have become an admired element of Canberra's urban landscape" and they are "arguably Canberra's most endearing piece of urban architecture". The ABC and The Canberra Times have described them as "iconic". The Canberra Times also stated in 2021 that the shelters are a "a much-loved symbol of Canberra", and residents of new suburbs are pleased when they are installed. They are often called "bunker" bus shelters by Canberrans.

The artist Trevor Dickinson has become well known for his drawings of the shelters, created as part of a project to record all of them. An exhibition of Dickinson's work was hosted by the Canberra Museum and Gallery in 2018. An ACTION bus was also wrapped with some of Dickinson's drawings to coincide with the exhibition. In 2020 Dickinson released a 166 page book entitled Beautiful Bus Shelters of Canberra which includes his photographs of all of the bus shelters and paintings of 52 of them. The Canberra Times has credited Dickinson as having "almost singlehandedly elevated the bus shelters to icon status".

A range of other reproductions of the bus shelters have also been created in recent years. These have included earrings, tattoos and tea towels. When a damaged bus shelter was offered for sale by a concrete recycling company in 2020, they received a large number of offers from people interested in installing it on their property. The company eventually decided to retain the bus shelter as a "smoko hut" and souvenir. In December 2023 a property developer lodged a development application for a 15-storey apartment building in central Canberra with balconies modelled on the concrete bus shelters. The proposal was rejected by the ACT Government's planning authority in December 2025 due, in part, to being excessively focused on the bus stop design rather than attempting to fit into the surrounding area. The first season of the television series Austin, which was filmed in Canberra and screened in 2024, included a concrete bus shelter among other locally famous locations.

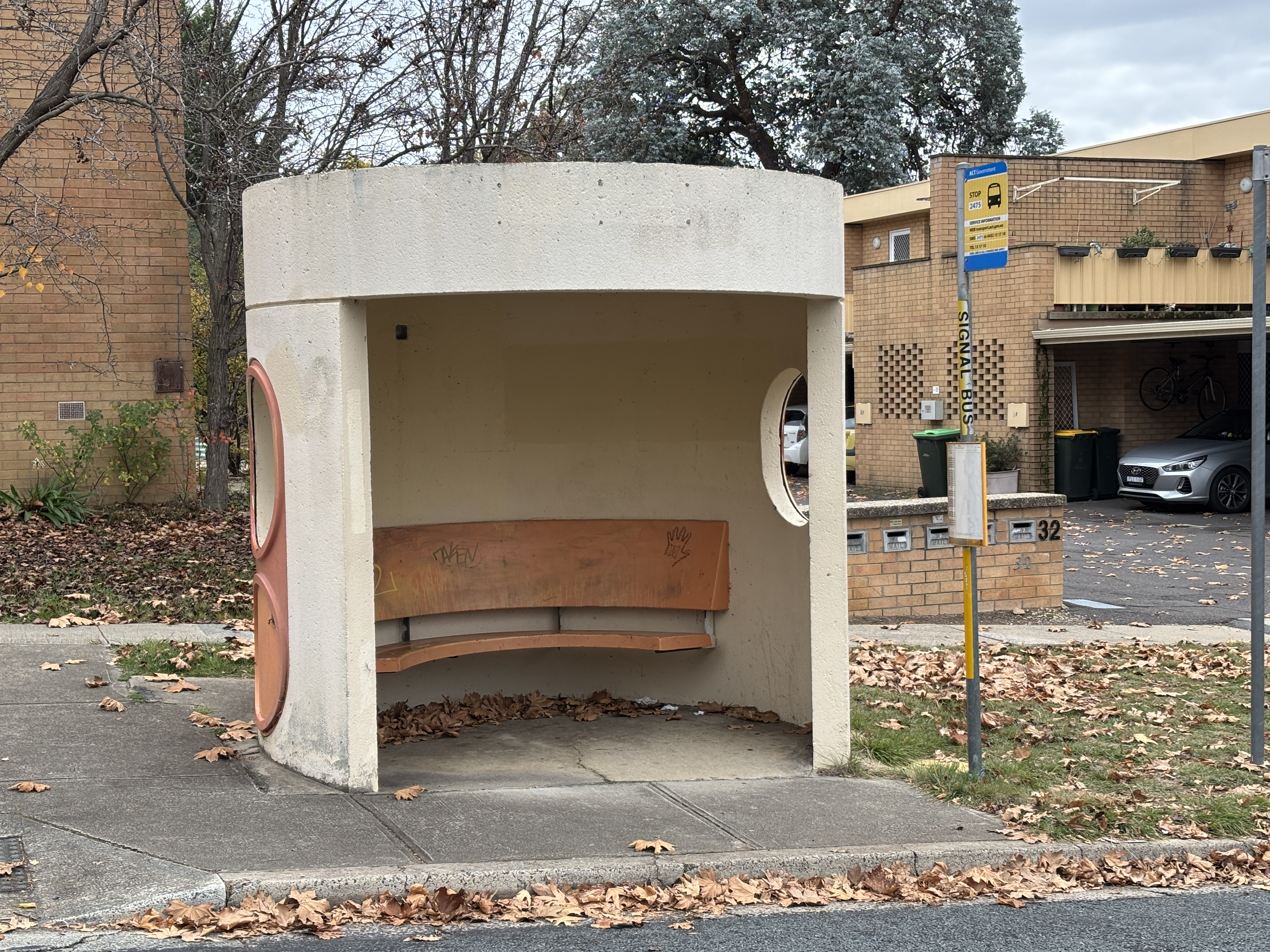
A bus shelter with its original seat in Farrer during 2026

In 2021 the ACT Chapter of the Australian Institute of Architects awarded the bus shelter design the Sir Roy Grounds Award for Enduring Architecture. In issuing the award, the Institute described the shelters as 'a remarkable design for a functional pre-cast concrete shelter, with a radical cylindrical form and fibreglass windows, suggesting space-age technology' and stated that the 'architectural integrity and enduring quality of the design is evident through its simplicity, functionality, and materiality'.

Dr Hanna Jaireth, a member of the ACT Heritage Council, noted in 2016 that, under the criteria used at that time, the shelters would only qualify for heritage listing in the future if "they were to become rare and endangered". The criteria were adjusted in early 2026, with the ACT's Minister for Heritage issuing guidance to prioritise protecting modernist heritage places. In line with this change, the ACT Heritage Council provisionally added the bus shelters to the ACT Heritage Register April 2026 and sought public feedback ahead of a final decision. The shelters were put on the heritage register in August 2026. The heritage listing does not require Transport Canberra to change how it manages the shelters, and they can continue to be relocated and modified.

== See also ==
- List of Brutalist structures
