= Belconnen Library =

Coordinates: 35°14′19″S 149°04′10″E

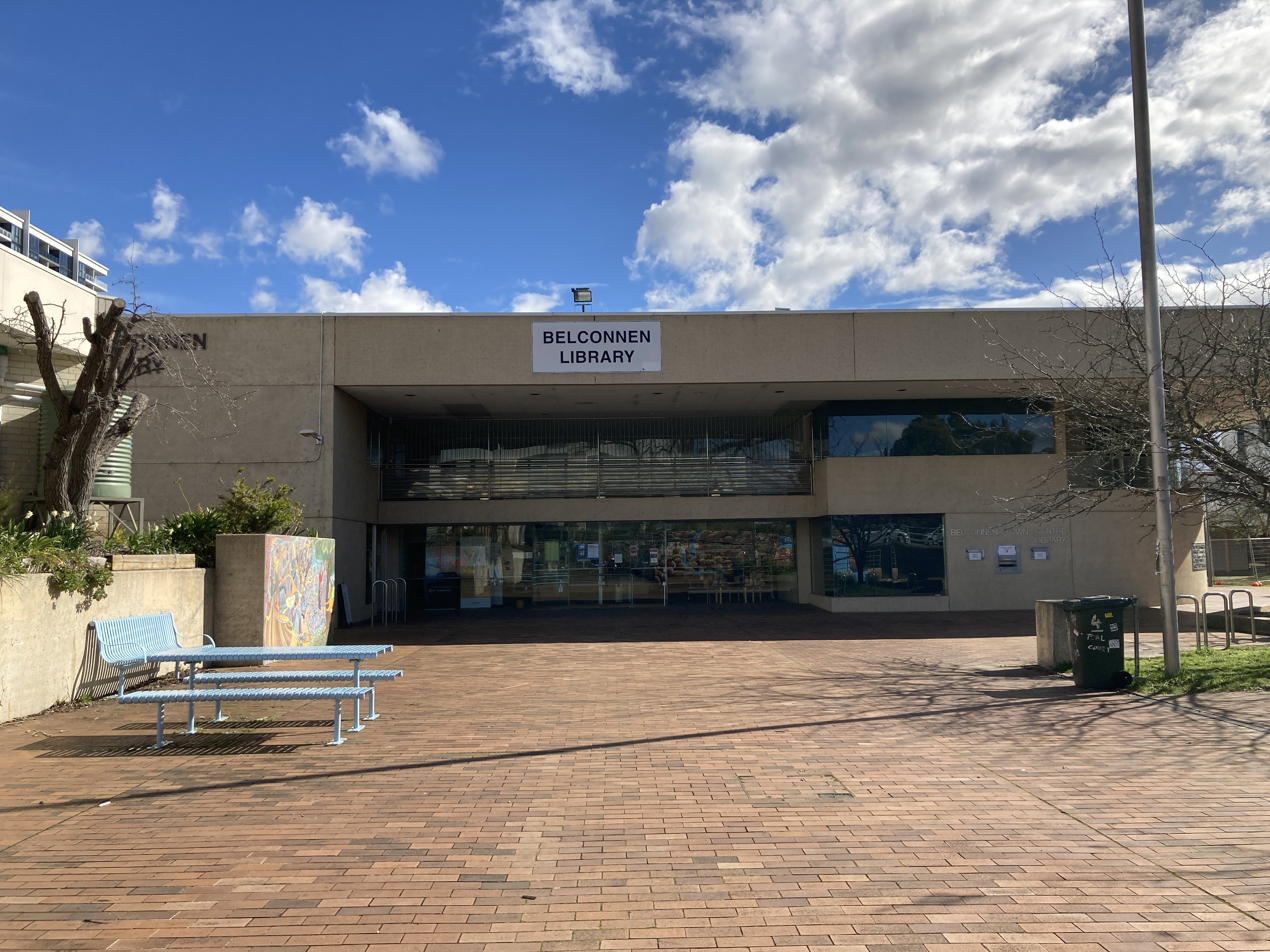
Belconnen Library in 2022

The Belconnen Library is the primary public library servicing the Belconnen district, one of ten libraries in the Libraries ACT network, and one of two in Belconnen, the other being Kippax Library.

== History ==
Built on the site of the former Emu Bank homestead, the Belconnen Library, designed by Robin Gibson, was opened by the Governor-General, Sir Zelman Cowen, in September 1981. The building subsequently won Gibson the RAIA 1982 Canberra Medallion for a work of outstanding merit in the non-housing category.

== Membership ==
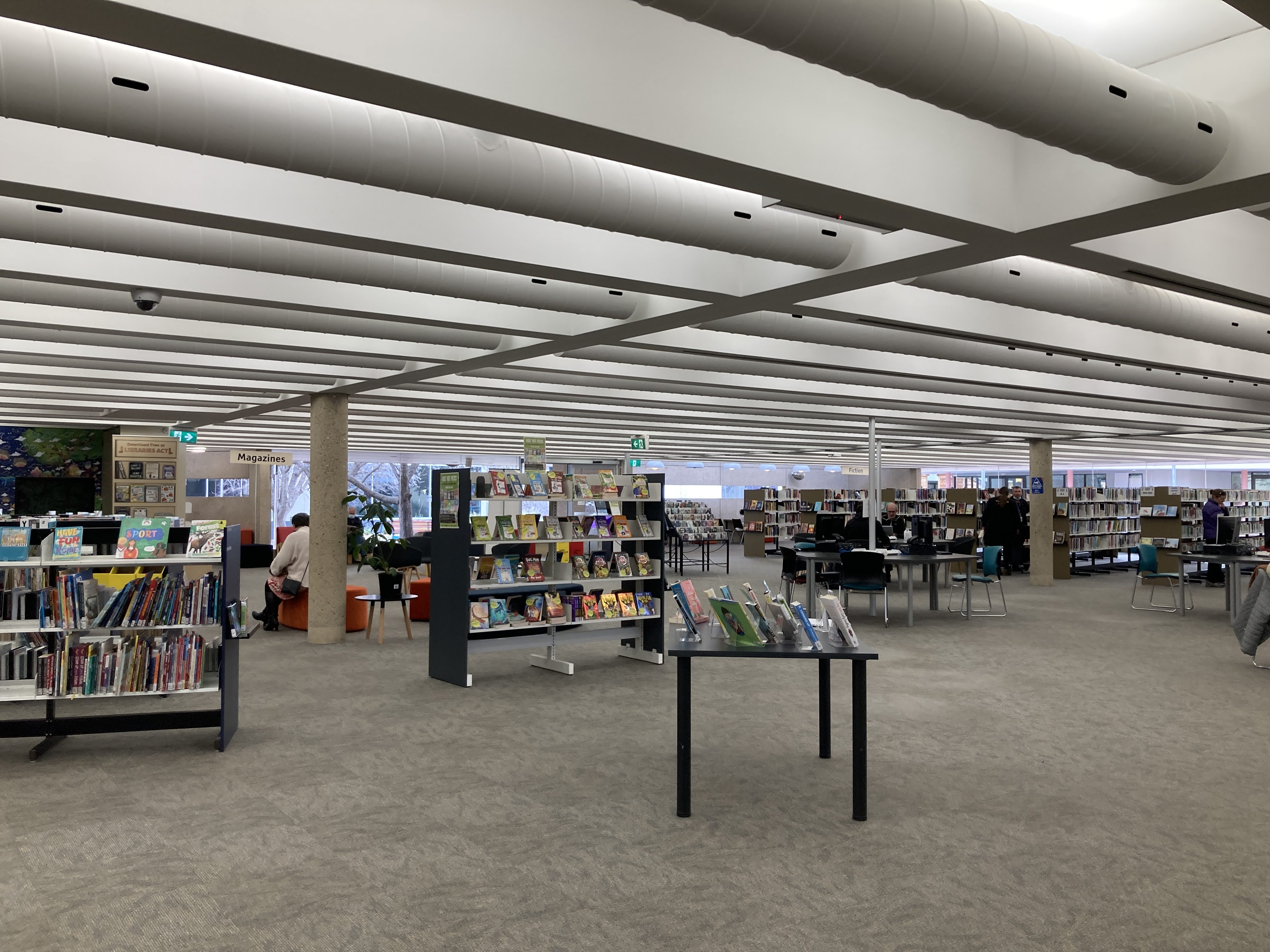
The interior of the library in 2022

Membership of Libraries ACT is open to anyone who lives, works, or studies in the Australian Capital Territory.
