= RMIT Building 220 =

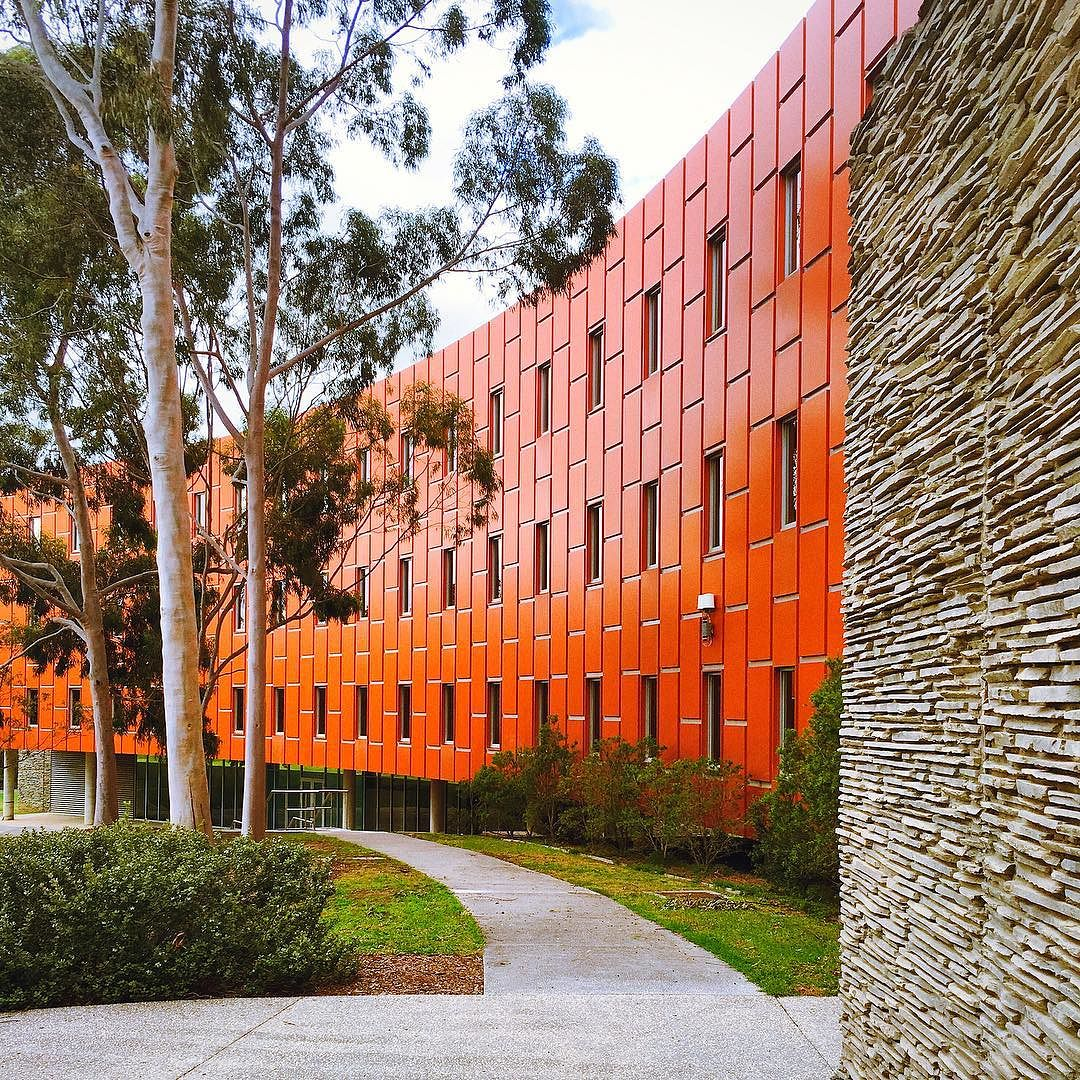

- Location within Melbourne

General information
- Type: Education
- Location: Bundoora, Victoria, Australia
- Coordinates: 37.680919°S 145.064477°E
- Completed: 1998
- Owner: RMIT

Design and construction
- Architecture firm: Wood Marsh
- Awards: RAIA Sir Zelman Cowen Award for Public Architecture Commendation, 1998 & William Wardell Award for Public Architecture, 1998

The RMIT Building 220 is one of the best known suburban educational buildings in Victoria. Designed by the practice of Wood Marsh, the building was built in 1998 as part of the Royal Melbourne Institute of Technology (RMIT) university Bundoora campus. It is part of RMIT's image campaign where the University is set to become more radical towards a new progressive identity. The building is a program of acquisition on suburban campus together with the University's other suburban campus which is the Brunswick campus.

== Architecture ==
The building introduces a bold textural and planning concept to an unremarkable outer suburban campus. The arc read as a metallic fuselage, while in an ironic twist, the rock textured concrete abutments are perforated with circular windows. The educational building is a formal reflections on texture, tectonics, and colour as expressed through a building skin.

== Awards ==
- 1998: Australian Institute of Architects, Sir Zelman Cowen Award for Public Architecture, Commendation
- 1998: Australian Institute of Architects, William Wardell Award for Public Architecture (Victoria)
