= Victorian Architecture Medal =

Highest award for architectural achievement in Victoria, Australia

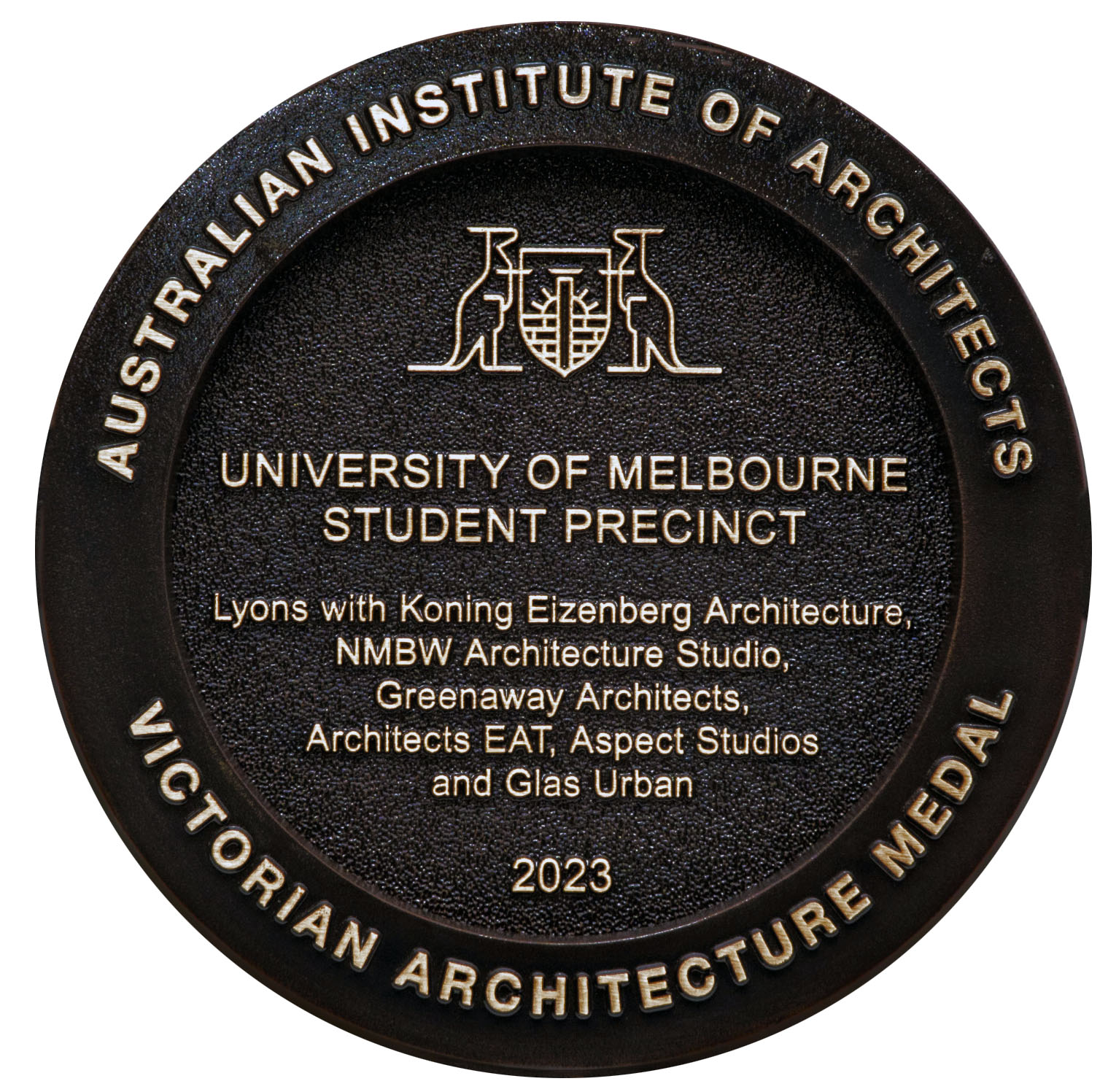
- Victorian Architecture Medal
- Awarded for: Highest architecture achievement in Victoria
- Country: Australia
- Presented by: Australian Institute of Architects (Victoria Chapter)
- First award: 1929; 97 years ago
- Currently held by: JCB Architects, Site Office and AW Maritime for St Kilda Pier Redevelopment, 2026
- Website: www.architecture.com.au/vic-awards

The Victorian Architecture Medal is the highest honour awarded annually by the Victoria Chapter of the Australian Institute of Architects (AIA) and has been awarded 38 consecutive times since 1987. The Medal was originally known as the ‘Street Architecture Medal’ introduced by the Royal Victorian Institute of Architects (RVIA) in 1929 as an award for the design of a building of exceptional merit. Buildings were judged on their "urban propriety and architectural etiquette; the building had to front a street, road, square or court" and with a requirement of being publicly accessible, thereby excluding residential and private commissions.

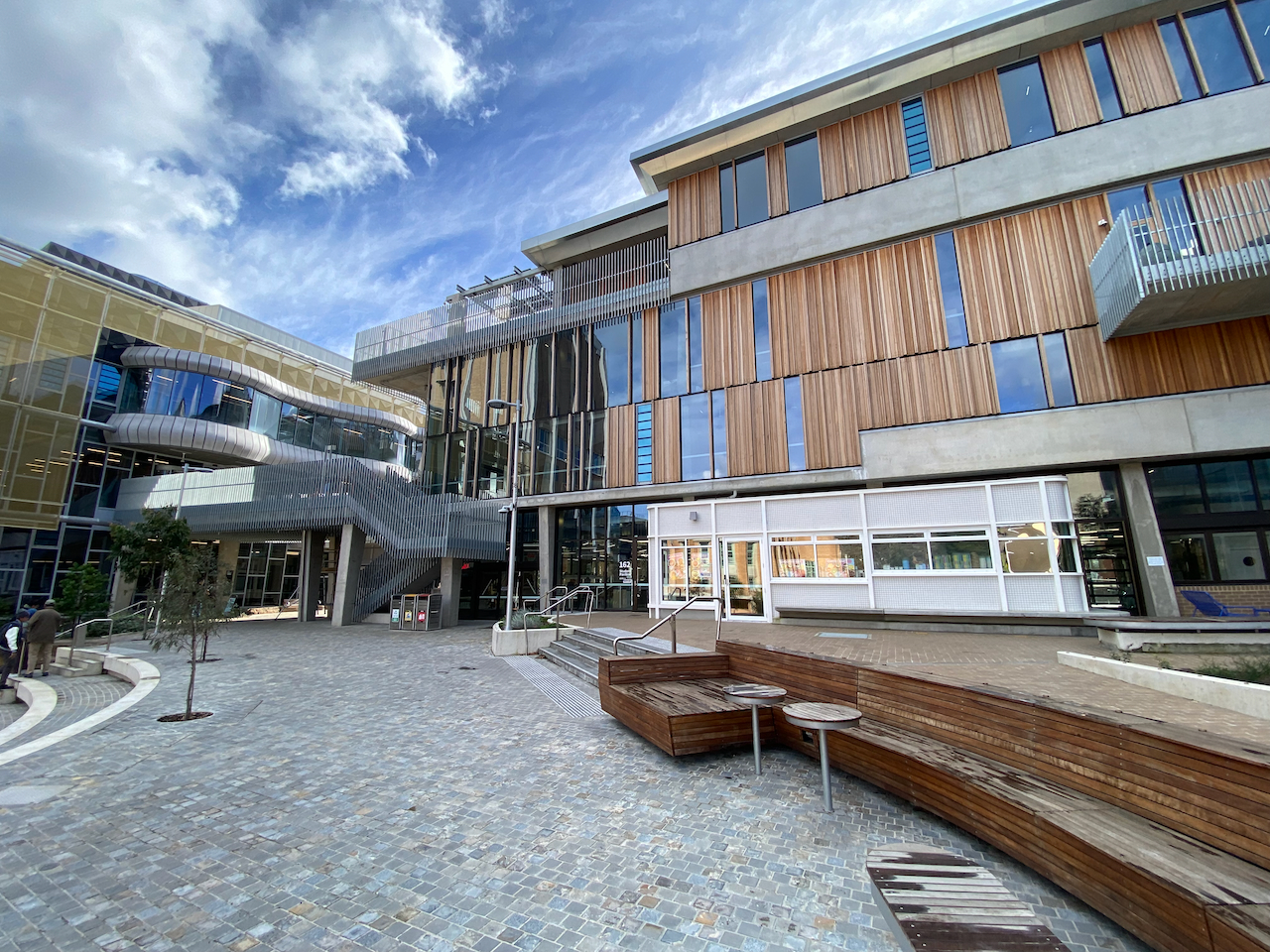
2023 Victorian Architecture Medal Winner: University of Melbourne Student Precinct

== Background ==
=== Definition ===
The Victorian Architecture Medal is awarded as part of the Victorian Architecture Awards and selected from the AIA Victoria Chapter 'named award' winners, from all direct entry categories and can also be drawn from the winners of the Sustainable Architecture Award, Colorbond Award for Steel Architecture, Melbourne Prize or Regional Prize. The winner of the Medal is judged to be the most outstanding project of the year, by definition making it 'a building, place or structure of exceptional merit', often winning multiple prizes across different award categories.

=== Medal ===
A cast circular bronze medal is awarded to the winner and usually affixed on the winning project in a prominent position.

=== Public vs residential awards ===
The medal winner usually has a strong civic and public character with architectural qualities that contribute to the greater public realm of the city or environment. Two exceptions were the awarding of the Medal to John Wardle Architecture for a private residence, Balnarring Beach House in 1997 and to Wood Marsh for the Yve Apartments on St Kilda Road in 2006.

Changes to the concept of 'public architecture' as the basis for the judging of the award occurred after World War II. The first post war Medal was awarded in 1954 to Roy Grounds House for a residential house and four apartments in Toorak. This was followed ten years later with the private and remote Grimwade House by McGlashan Everist who were awarded the second Medal in 1963. On only six occasions it has been awarded to projects located outside metropolitan Melbourne (1940, 1963, 1987, 1997, 2022 and 2024).

Since 1996 the annual William Wardell Award for Public Architecture has specifically recognised institutional and public buildings. The Dimity Reed Melbourne Prize established in 1997 has become another significant award that addresses the civic and public realm contributions of architecture to the city, but does not focus solely on the experience of the 'street'.

== Street Architecture Medal (1929–1942) ==
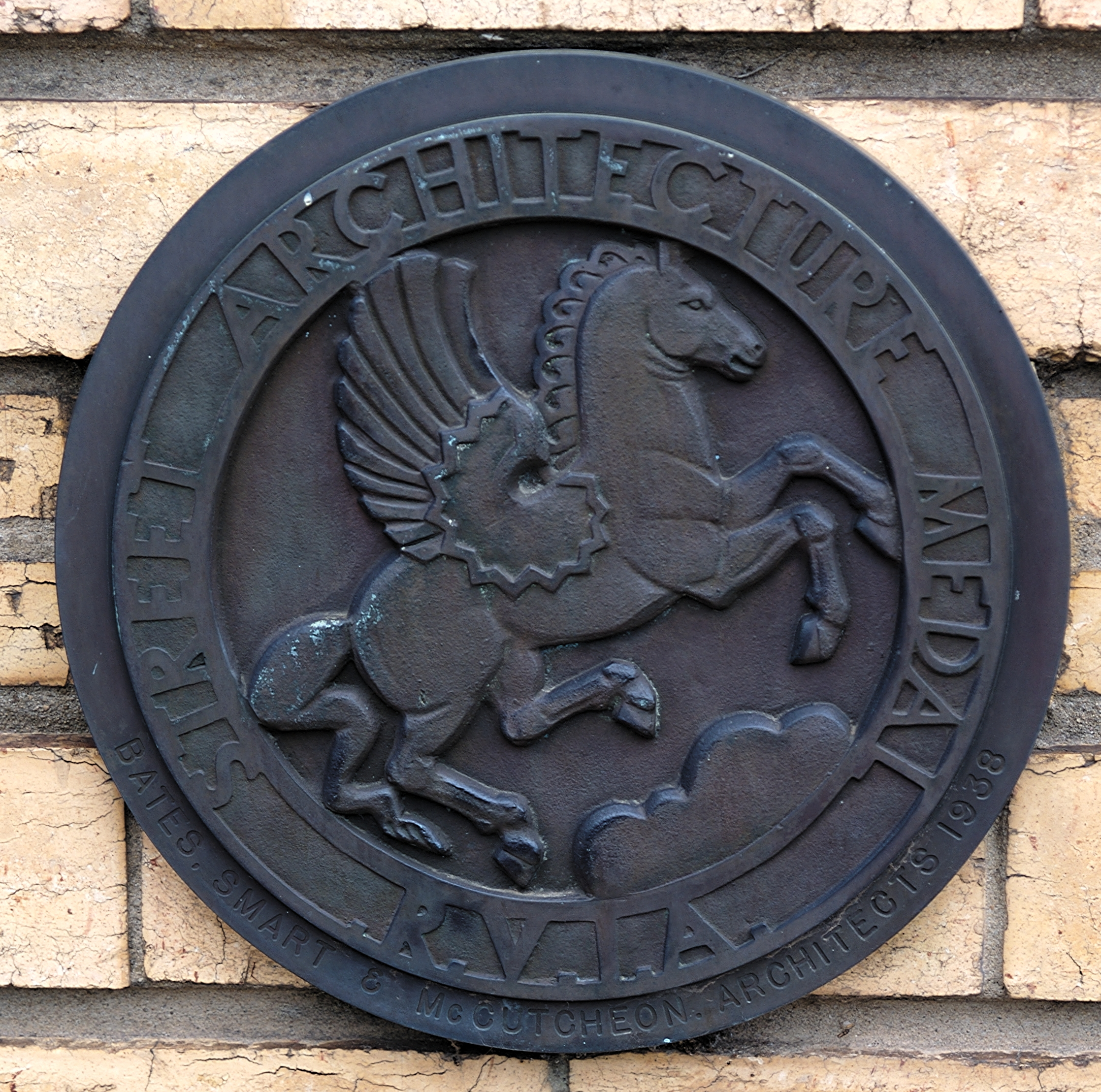
Street Architecture Medal, 1938 for Second Church of Christ Scientist by Bates Smart McCutcheon. Medal design by J.C. Barton and H.J. Tribe.

=== RIBA influence ===
The Royal Victorian Institute of Architect's (RVIA) 'Street Architecture Medal' is considered the predecessor and equivalent of the current Victorian Architecture Medal. It was first awarded in 1929 and consecutively 14 times until 1942. The Street Architecture Award was a concept imported from the Royal Institute of British Architects (RIBA) that had established an award with the same name in 1923, an idea which had been around since before World War I. The award was created to encourage design excellence in architecture and increase public interest in the 'street architecture' of London. The first award for best public building in London was made to W. Curtis Green for Wolseley House at 157–160 Piccadilly.

=== First Medal 1929 ===
The 'Extracts from the Examining Jury's Report' of the first Victorian award by chair P.A. Oakley and jury were reported in the Journal of the Royal Victorian Institute of Architects in July 1929."As architects, we feel deeply the proud responsibility enjoyed by members of our profession as sponsors of the city buildings which form possibly the most important visible expression of a city’s individuality and attractions." The jury could recognise any building built within the past five years, with the objectives of the award listed as twofold —"Firstly, that buildings which notably contribute to the civic beauty and architecture of the cities of this State should be publicly singled out and acknowledged, in order that universal appreciation of their good qualities and emulation of their characteristics may be encouraged, and that through this means a widespread sense of civic responsibility may be developed and fostered in the architects and citizens of our State..." and secondly that "...due recognition by his fellow practitioners and fellow citizens may be made of the high achievement of the architect responsible for a building deemed worthy of this award...".

It was also noted that a competition was to be held for the design of the bronze plaque to be attached to the winning building, open to RVIA Members and students. In July 1930 it was announced that the design competition for the Street Architecture 'plaque' was won by Mr. J.C. Barton and Mr. H.J. Tribe. The approximately 270mm (10 inch) bas–relief circular bronze medal features the winged horse of Pegasus, rising above stylised clouds.

The first medal was presented to Francis House at 107 Collins Street in Melbourne, a narrow fronted five storey office building with a ground level shopfront, designed by architects and cousins Blackett and Forster. William Blackett was the then president of the RVIA in his second term (1928–1930). The building still stands in near original condition. It was built in 1927–1928 for the established pharmacists and chemists, Henry Francis & Co. It was notable for its bronze shopfront details and beige and orange retractable awning, inspired by the shopping streets of Paris and New York, greatly contributing to the characterisation of the area as the 'Paris End' of Collins Street.

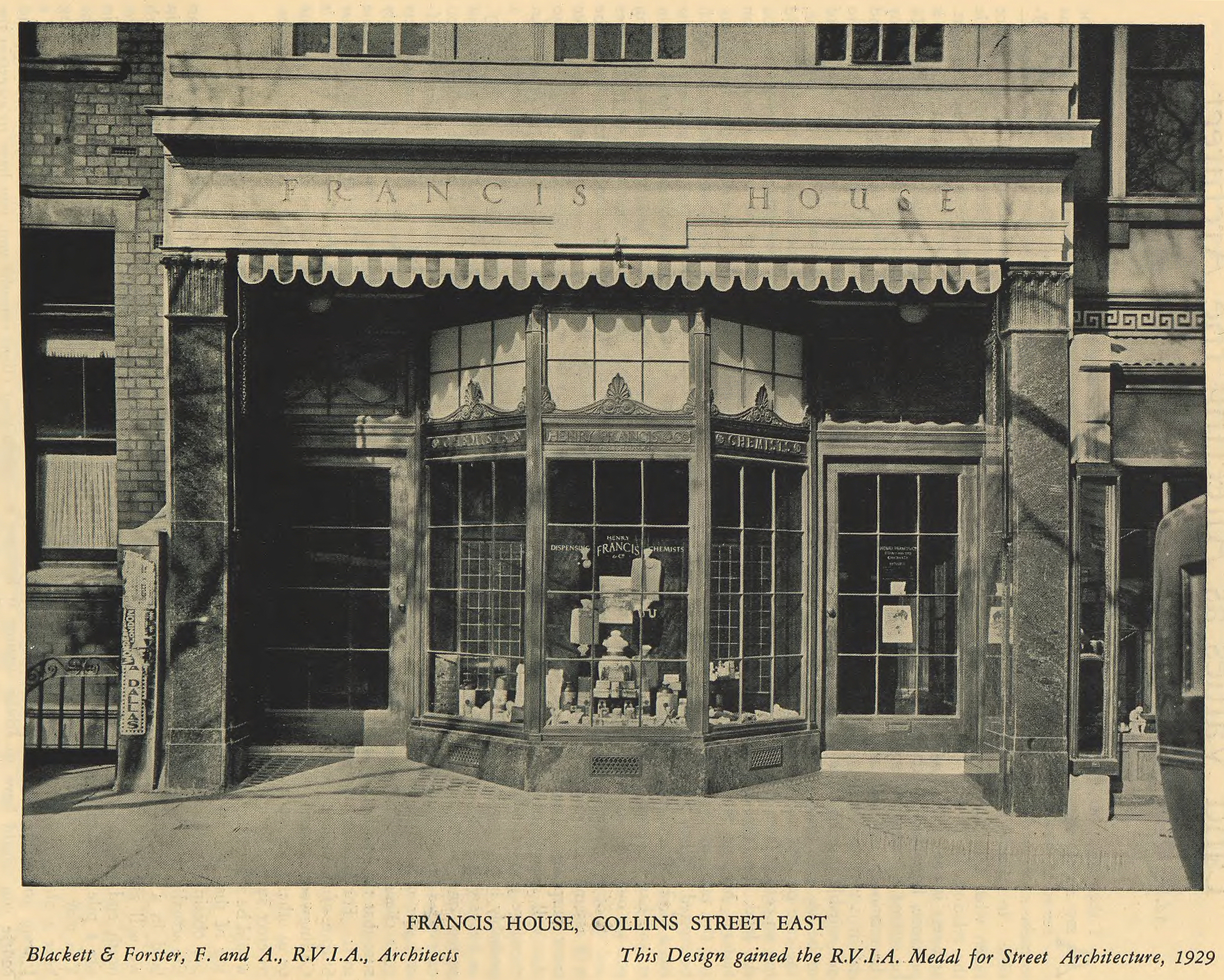
1929 Street Architecture Medal Winner 'Francis House' 107 Collins Street, Melbourne

=== 1937 Medal ===
In 1936 the president of the RVIA described the purpose of the award was to "encourage excellence of design and public interest in street architecture, the Institute having decided to examine annually buildings completed during the previous three years and to award a medal for a building of exceptional merit". Describing the 1937 medal winning project the Royal Australasian College of Surgeons Building on Spring Street in East Melbourne by Leighton Irwin and Roy K. Stevenson "The Jury considers that this is an unusual example of street architecture as it actually faces streets on all four elevations and presents a very interesting treatment of the various facades."

=== 1938 Medal ===
A jury of eleven men judged the 1938 Award, consisting of Mr. Leslie M. Perrott, vice-president of the Royal Victorian Institute of Architects; Mr. Percy Everett, Chief Architect of the Department of Public Works, Mr. J.S. MacDonald, Director of the National Gallery (NGV); Mr. W.R. Dean, the Art Inspector, Education Department, State of Victoria and seven architects appointed by the Institute Council; G.R. King, Marcus W. Martin, Charles E. Serpell, A.C. Collins, E. Keith Mackay, Edward F. Billson and John F.D. Scarborough. For the first time a building outside the City of Melbourne won the award for the Second Church of Christ, Scientist in Cookson Street, Camberwell, by Bates Smart McCutcheon, their third medal in 10 years. The jury commentary of the building stated that "restraint rather than decoration tends to characterise accepted standards of good architecture to-day and this building reveals a particularly happy balance between these two considerations. It represents a satisfactory solution to the architectural problem of a modern church without resort to traditional ecclesiastical motifs."

=== Other Street Architecture Awards and Medals in Australia ===
In the 1930s the Royal Institute of British Architects began awarding Street Architecture Awards and Bronze Medals to international projects, including Hackett Memorial Buildings at University of Western Australia which was awarded a RIBA Bronze Medal in 1931. Later Perth Girls' School in Western Australia was awarded a RIBA Bronze Medal in 1939, for the period 1936–1938. British Medical Association (BMA) House at 137 Macquarie Street, Sydney, by architects Fowell and McConnel was presented the RIBA Street Architecture Medal in 1935 for buildings completed in the five years to end of 1933. This was the first time the award had been presented in New South Wales. The RIBA provided the architects with a bronze medal to be affixed to the building and a signed diploma. It was planned at the time for an award to be presented every three years to a new building in New South Wales.

=== Post World War II changes and a new Award ===
A long pause caused by World War II and a slow return to a regular annual architecture awards in Victoria saw none given until awards recommenced in 1954 with an awards held on the evening of Tuesday 7 December at which time the Street Architecture Medal was replaced and renamed as the 'Victorian Architecture Medal' for the first time.

Now called the Victorian Architecture Medal, its first postwar award was made last night. The building receiving this honor, the highest in Victoria, is a relatively small block of apartments in Toorak. The nature of the building honored and the change in the award's title bespeak both our postwar emphasis on residential building and our realisation that true architectural merit is concerned with every aspect of a building rather than its facade, be it a huge hospital or humble suburban home. — Neil Clerehan, "Toorak Apartments Win Architectural Medal", The Age, 8 December 1954

Although awards recommenced in 1954, for the reminder of the 1950s, the 1960s and the 1970s, medals were infrequently awarded. It was not until 1987 that the Victorian Architecture Medal was awarded consistently and has been given annually until present as part of the Victorian Chapter Awards program.

== Victorian Architecture Medal winners (since 1987) ==
Modern Era Medal Winners by Year
Year	Winner	Project	Location	Other AIA awards
2026	Jackson Clements Burrows Architects, Site Office Landscape Architecture and AW Maritime	St Kilda Pier Redevelopment	Pier Road, St Kilda	Dimity Reed Melbourne Prize, 2026; Joseph Reed Award for Urban Design, 2026 (Vic)
2025	Searle x Waldron	Northern Memorial Park Depot	Northern Memorial Park, 49 Sages Road, Glenroy	Harry Seidler Award for Commercial Architecture, 2025 (National); Dimity Reed Melbourne Prize, 2025; Commercial Architecture Award, 2025 (Vic); Sustainable Architecture Commendation, 2025 (Vic)
2024	Public Realm Lab	Powerhouse Place	Hugh King Drive, Mildura	Regional Prize, 2024; Joseph Reed Award for Urban Design, 2024; Allan and Beth Coldicutt Award for Sustainable Architecture, 2024
2023	Lyons with Koning Eizenberg Architecture, NMBW Architecture Studio, Greenaway Architects, Architects EAT, Aspect Studios and Glas Urban	University of Melbourne Student Precinct	University of Melbourne, Carlton	Walter Burley Griffin Award for Urban Design, 2023 (National); National Award for Heritage Architecture, 2023; Henry Bastow Award for Educational Architecture, 2023; Heritage Architecture Award for Creative Adaptation, 2023; Joseph Reed Award for Urban Design, 2023
2022	Noxon Giffen Architects (with McGregor Coxall)	Grampians Peaks Trail Stage 2	Grampians National Park (Gariwerd)	Regional Prize, 2022
2021	Grimshaw in collaboration with Monash University	Woodside Building for Technology and Design	20 Exhibition Walk, Monash University Clayton Campus	Sir Zelman Cowen Award for Public Architecture, 2021; Melbourne Prize, 2021; Colorbond Award for Steel Architecture, 2021; Award for Educational Architecture, 2021
2020	Kerstin Thompson Architects	Broadmeadows Town Hall	10 Dimboola Road, Broadmeadows	Public Architecture Commendation, 2020
2019	Peter Elliott Architecture and Urban Design	Parliament of Victoria Members' Annexe	Spring Street, East Melbourne	National Award for Public Architecture, 2019; Melbourne Prize, 2019; William Wardell Award for Public Architecture, 2019; Joseph Reed Award for Urban Design, 2019; Allan and Beth Coldicutt Award for Sustainable Architecture, 2019
2018	Lyons with NMBW Architecture Studio, Harrison and White, MvS Architects and Maddison Architects	New Academic Street, RMIT University	Bowen Street, Melbourne	Melbourne Prize (Joint Winner), 2018; Joseph Reed Award for Urban Design, 2018; Henry Bastow Award for Educational Architecture, 2018; Award for Interior Architecture, 2018; National Award for Urban Design, 2018
2017	Silver Thomas Hanley, DesignInc & McBride Charles Ryan	Victorian Comprehensive Cancer Centre (VCCC)	305 Grattan Street, Melbourne	William Wardell Award for Public Architecture, 2017
2016	ARM Architecture	Geelong Library and Heritage Centre	51 Little Malop Street, Geelong	Sir Zelman Cowen Award for Public Architecture, 2016; William Wardell Award for Public Architecture, 2016; Marion Mahony Award for Interior Architecture, 2016; Regional Prize, 2016
2015	ARM Architecture	Shrine of Remembrance, Galleries of Remembrance	Birdwood Avenue, Melbourne	Sir Zelman Cowen Award for Public Architecture, 2015; Melbourne Prize, 2015; William Wardell Award for Public Architecture,2015; John George Knight Award (Heritage Architecture), 2015; Urban Design Architecture Award, 2015
2014	McBride Charles Ryan	Dallas Brooks Community Primary School	26—36 King Street, Dallas	National Award for Public Architecture, 2014; Melbourne Prize, 2014; William Wardell Award for Public Architecture, 2014
2013	Sean Godsell Architects in association with Peddle Thorp Architects	RMIT University Design Hub (Building 100)	150 Victoria Street, Carlton	William Wardell Award for Public Architecture, 2013; Colorbond Award for Steel Architecture, 2013
2012	Billiard Leece Partnership and Bates Smart	Royal Children's Hospital	50 Flemington Road, Parkville	Melbourne Prize, 2012; William Wardell Award for Public Architecture, 2012
2011	Cox Architecture	AAMI Park	Olympic Boulevard, Melbourne	Melbourne Prize, 2011; William Wardell Award for Public Architecture, 2011; Colorbond Award for Steel Architecture, 2011
2010	Woods Bagot and NH Architecture	Melbourne Convention and Exhibition Centre	1 Convention Centre Place, South Wharf	Melbourne Prize, 2010; William Wardell Award for Public Architecture, 2010; Steel Architecture Award, Award for Sustainable Architecture, 2010
2009	ARM Architecture	Melbourne Recital Centre and MTC Theatre Project, (Southbank Theatre)	31 Sturt Street, Southbank	William Wardell Award for Public Architecture, 2009; Joseph Reed Award for Urban Design, 2009; Marion Mahony Award for Interior Architecture, 2009; Emil Sodersten Award for Interior Architecture, 2009 (National)
2008	John Wardle Architecture	Nigel Peck Centre for Learning and Leadership, Melbourne Grammar School	47 Domain Road, Melbourne	William Wardell Award for Public Architecture, 2008; National Award for Public Architecture, 2008; Emil Sodersten Award for Interior Architecture, 2008
2007	Grimshaw Jackson Joint Venture	Southern Cross Station	Spencer Street, Melbourne	William Wardell Award for Public Architecture, 2007; Walter Burley Griffin Award for Urban Design, 2007 (National)
2006	Wood Marsh Architecture	Yve Apartments	576–578 St Kilda Road, Melbourne	Harold Desbrowe–Annear Residential Award, 2006; Residential Architecture — Multiple Housing (National), 2016
2005	McBride Charles Ryan Architecture and Interior Design	Templestowe Park Primary School Multipurpose Hall	399 Church Road, Templestowe	William Wardell Award for Public Architecture, 2005
2004	ARM Architecture	Shrine of Remembrance Visitor Centre and Garden Courtyard	Birdwood Avenue, Melbourne	Melbourne Prize, 2004; William Wardell Award for Public Architecture, 2004; John George Knight Award (Heritage Architecture), 2004; Walter Burley Griffin Award for Urban Design (National), 2004
2003	Lab Architecture Studio in association with Bates Smart	Federation Square	Flinders Street & St Kilda Road, Melbourne	Melbourne Prize, 2003; Joseph Reed Award for Urban Design, 2003; Mahony Griffin Award for Interior Architecture (National Award), 2003
2002	Lyons	Victoria University Online Training Centre, St Albans Campus	University Boulevard, St Albans	William Wardell Award for Public Architecture, 2003
2001	Denton Corker Marshall	Melbourne Museum	11 Nicholson Street, Carlton Gardens, Carlton	Sir Zelman Cowen Award for Public Architecture, 2001; William Wardell Award for Public Architecture, 2001
2000	FIELD Consultants	Holyoake Cottage	54A Connell Street, Hawthorn	Harold Desbrowe–Annear Award, 2000
1999	Nation Fender Katsalidis Architects	Ian Potter Museum of Art	Swanston Street, Melbourne	Commendation for Public Architecture (National), 1999; William Wardell Award for Public Architecture, 1999; Melbourne Prize, 1999
1998	Wood Marsh/Pels Innes Neilson Kosloff	Eastern Freeway Extension (Stage 3) Sound Barriers	M3 Eastern Freeway (Doncaster Road to Springvale Road), Doncaster, Doncaster East and Blackburn North	Walter Burley Griffin Award for Urban Design, 1998 (National)
1997	John Wardle Architecture	Isaacson Davis Beach House	Balnarring, Mornington Peninsula	Harold Desbrowe–Annear Award, 1997
1996	ARM Architecture	Storey Hall (RMIT Building 16)	336 Swanston Street, Melbourne	William Wardell Award for Public Architecture, 1996; Marion Mahony Award for Interior Architecture, 1996; Interior Award (National), 1996
1995	Edmond & Corrigan in association with Demaine Partnership	RMIT Building 8	360 Swanston Street, Melbourne	Walter Burley Griffin Award for Urban Design (National), 1995; Award for Institutional Alterations & Extensions, 1995; City of Melbourne Award for Institutional Buildings, 1995
1994	Williams & Boag	Tyne Street Multiple Housing	8–28 Tyne Street, Carlton	Walter Burley Griffin Award for Urban Design, 1994 (National); Merit Award for Multiple Residential, 1993; City of Melbourne Building and Planning Awards Merit Award—Multiple Dwellings Category, 1994
1993	Crone Ross	Chapel of the Holy Trinity	Trinity Grammar School, Charles Street, Kew	Merit award for New Institutional Buildings, 1993
1992	Tompkins, Shaw and Evans in association with Daryl Jackson	MCG Southern Stand Redevelopment (Great Southern Stand/Shane Warne Stand)	Brunton Avenue, East Melbourne	Sir Zelman Cowen Award for Public Architecture, (National) 1993; Maggie Edmond Enduring Architecture Award, 2020
1991	Peter Elliott	Carlton Baths and Community Centre	248 Rathdowne Street, Carlton	1991 New Institutional Award [merit], 1991; BHP Steel Profile Architecture of the Decade Awards 1981–1991 [highly commended], 1991; BHP Steel Sheet and Coil Products Division and Metal Building [merit], 1991
1990	ARM Architecture	Brunswick Community Health Centre	11 Glenlyon Road, Brunswick	Institutional: New, Merit Award, 1990
1989	Edmond & Corrigan with Ministry for Housing and Construction	Dandenong College of TAFE, Stage 3 (now Building P Chisholm Institute)	121 Stud Road, Dandenong	Commendation for Public Architecture (National), 1989; Outstanding Architecture Award — New Institutional Category (Victoria Chapter), 1989
1988	Katsalidis & Partners	Deutscher Fine Art Gallery and Residence (now private residence)	7 Elm Tree Place, Carlton	Residential: Alterations and Extensions, Merit Award, 1988
1987	Gregory Burgess	Catholic Church of St Michael & St John	9 McLachlan Street, Horsham	Institutional: New, Merit Award, 1987; VBMA Excellence in Clay Brick Architecture Award, 1987

== Gallery of awarded projects ==
Selected Victorian Architecture Medal Winners since 1992
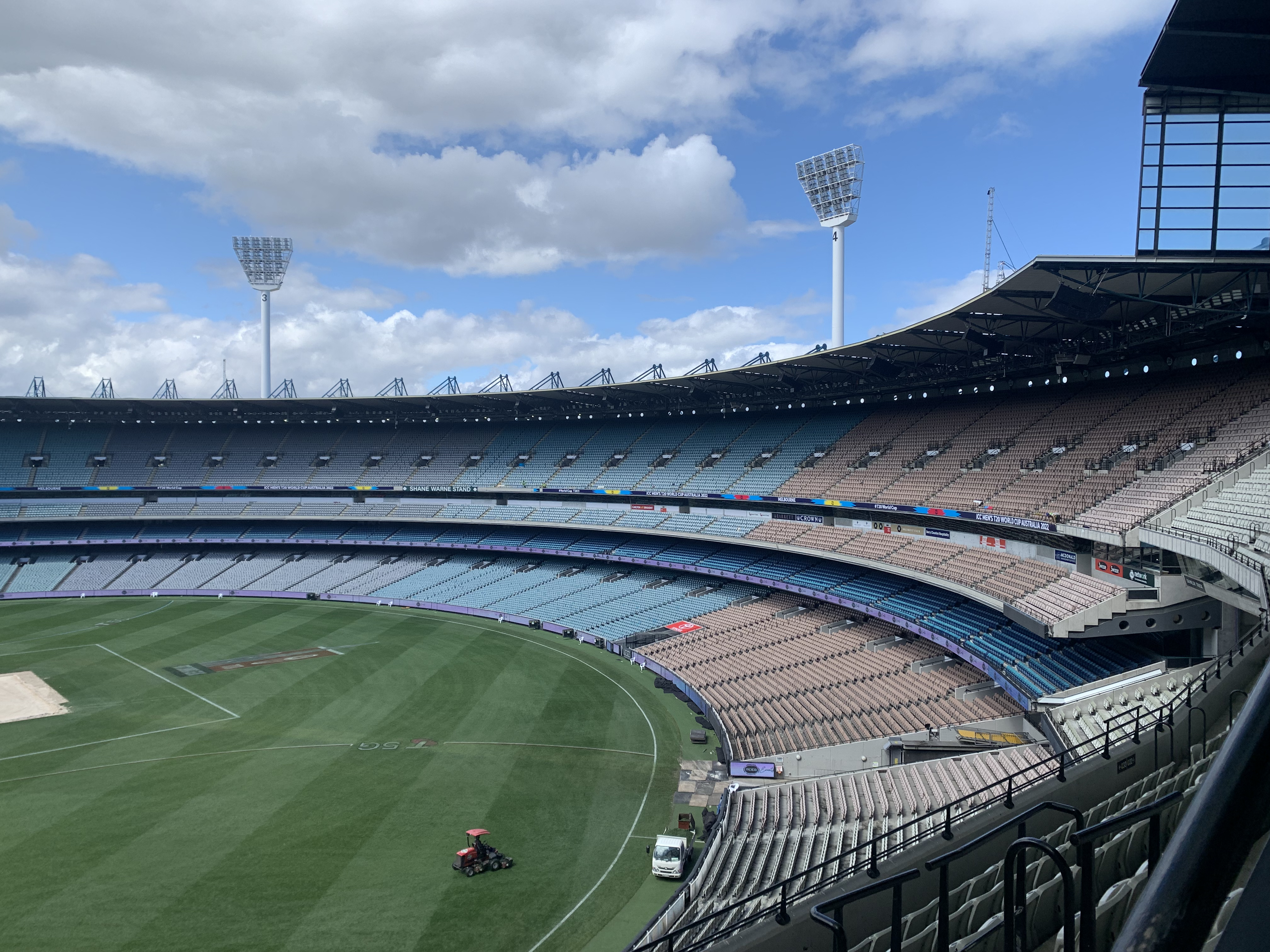
1992 Victorian Architecture Medal, Great Southern Stand MCG by Daryl Jackson

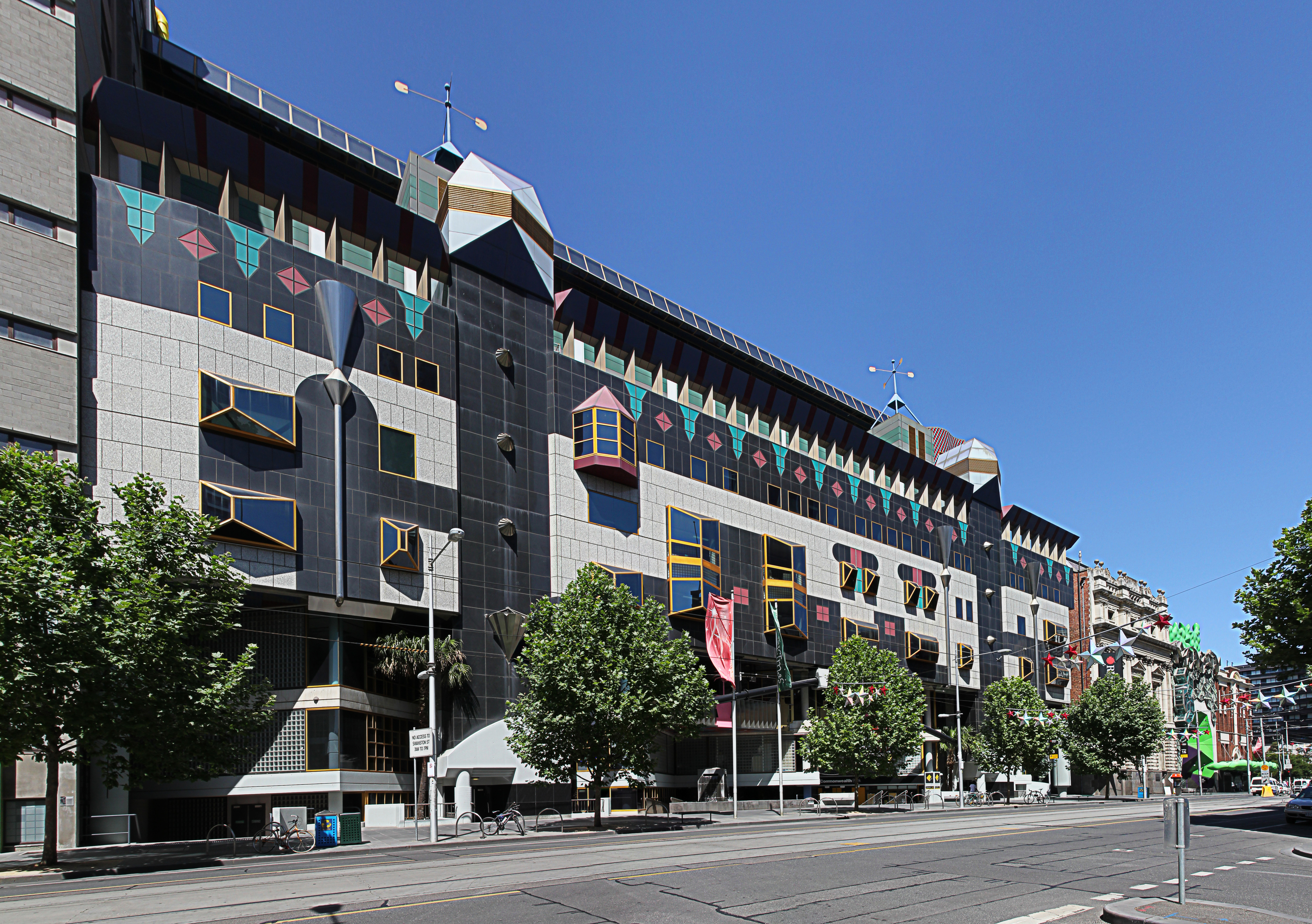
1995 Victorian Architecture Medal, RMIT Building 8 by Edmond & Corrigan

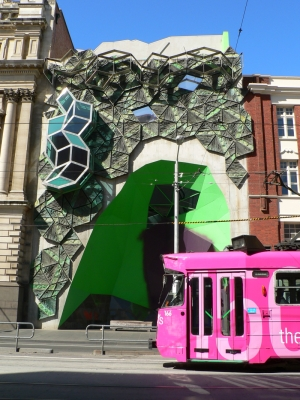
1996 Victorian Architecture Medal, Storey Hall RMIT by Ashton Raggatt McDougall

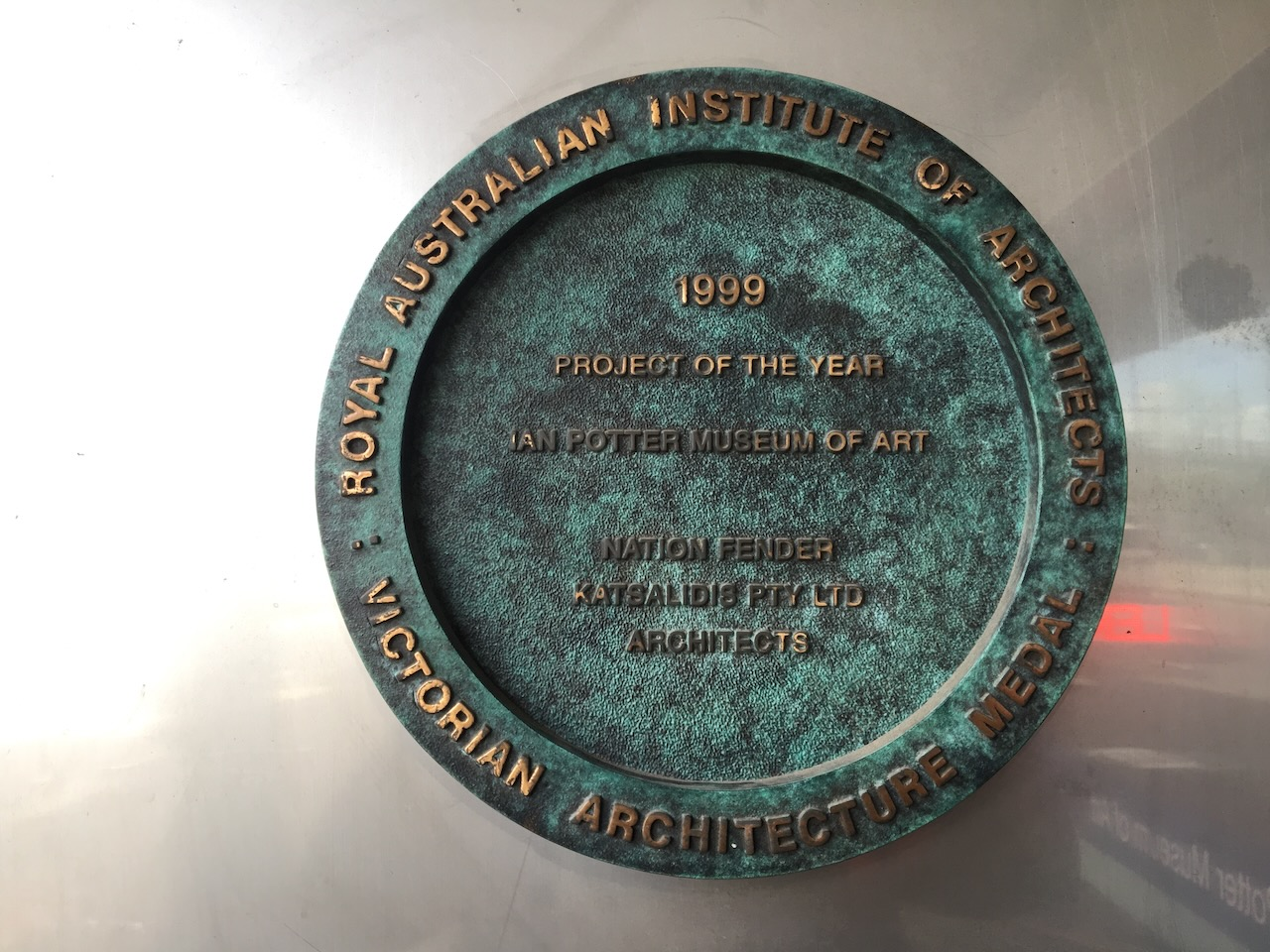
1999 Victorian Architecture Medal, Medal installed at Ian Potter Museum of Art, University of Melbourne

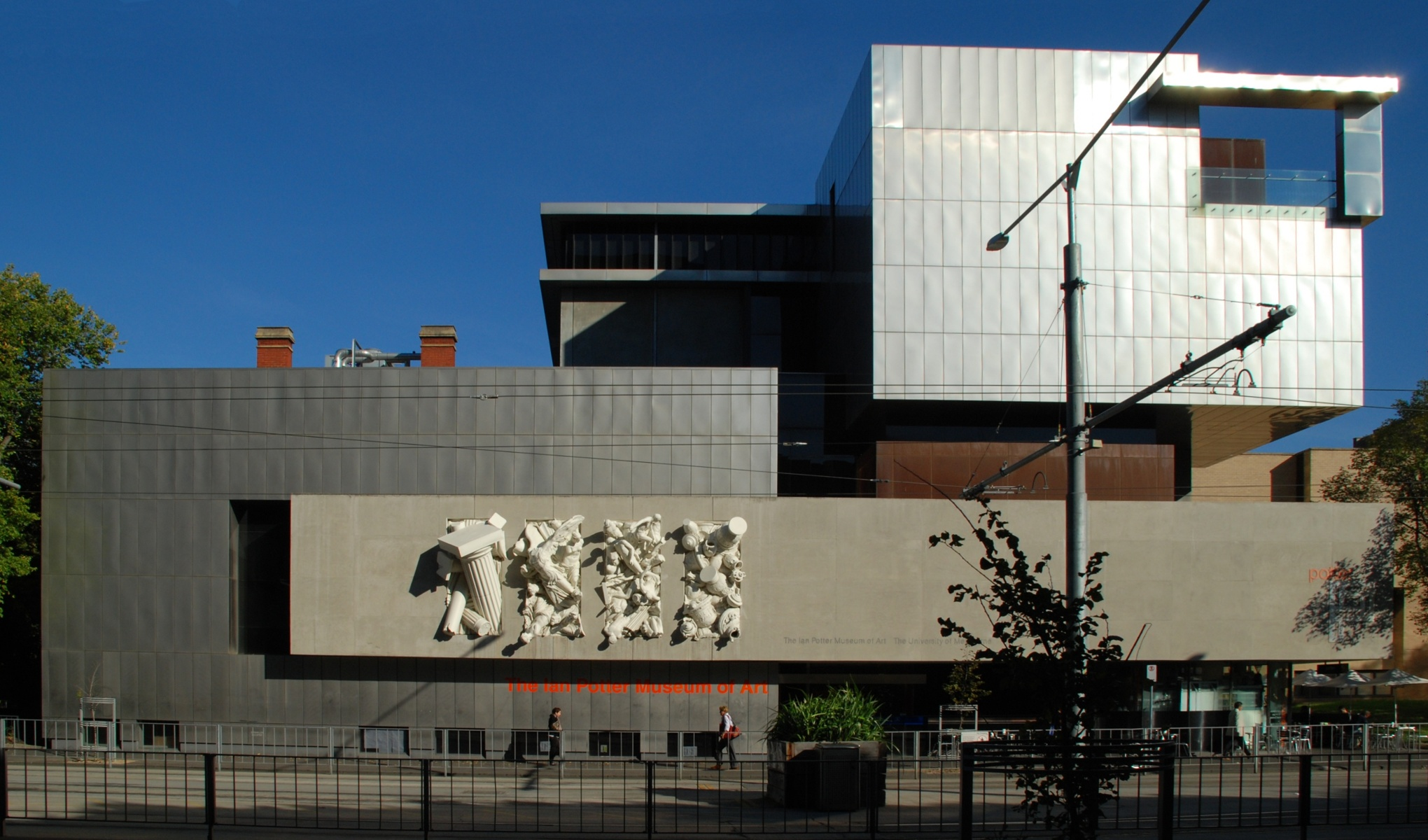
1999 Victorian Architecture Medal, Ian Potter Museum of Art, University of Melbourne

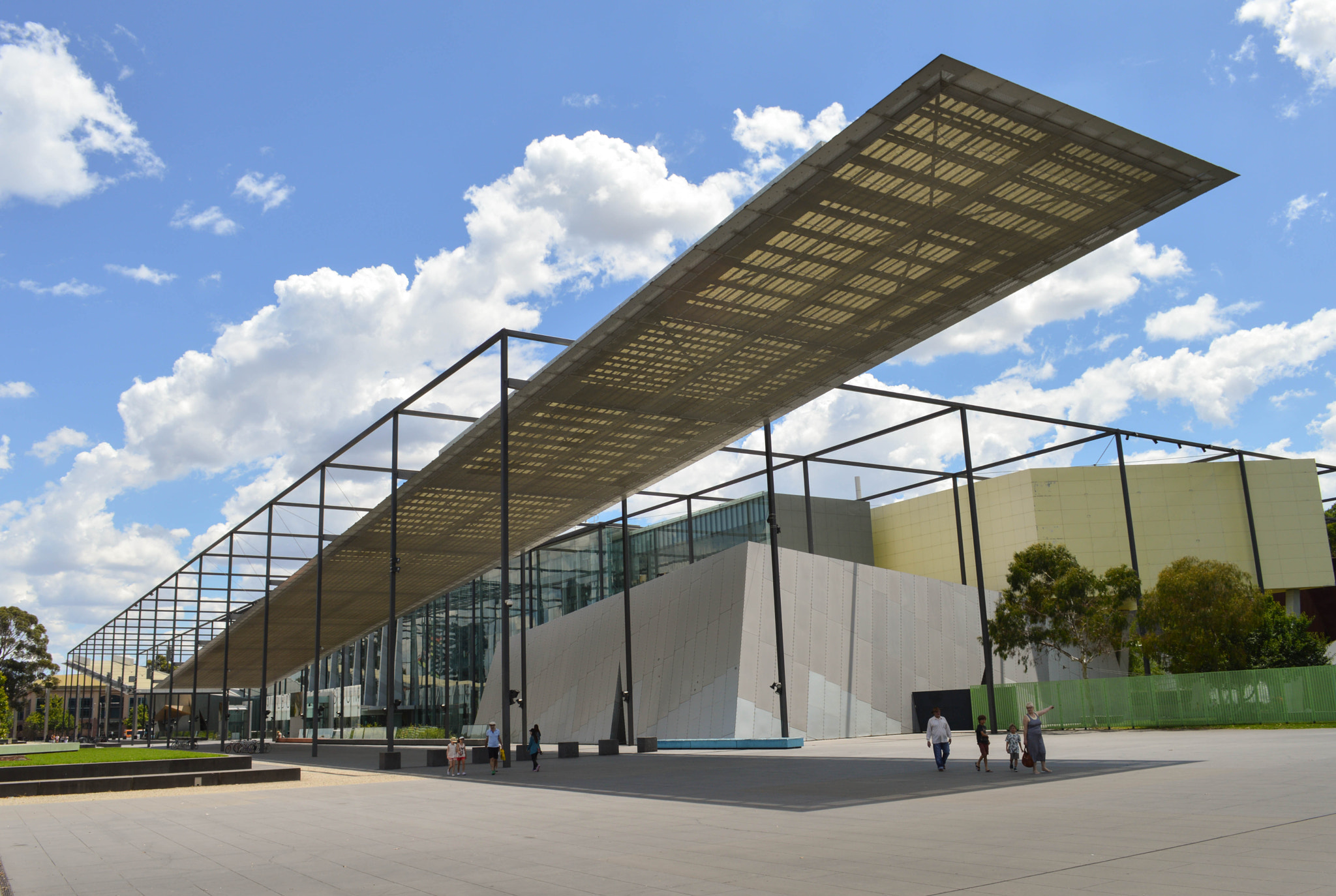
2001 Victorian Architecture Medal, Melbourne Museum by Denton Corker Marshall

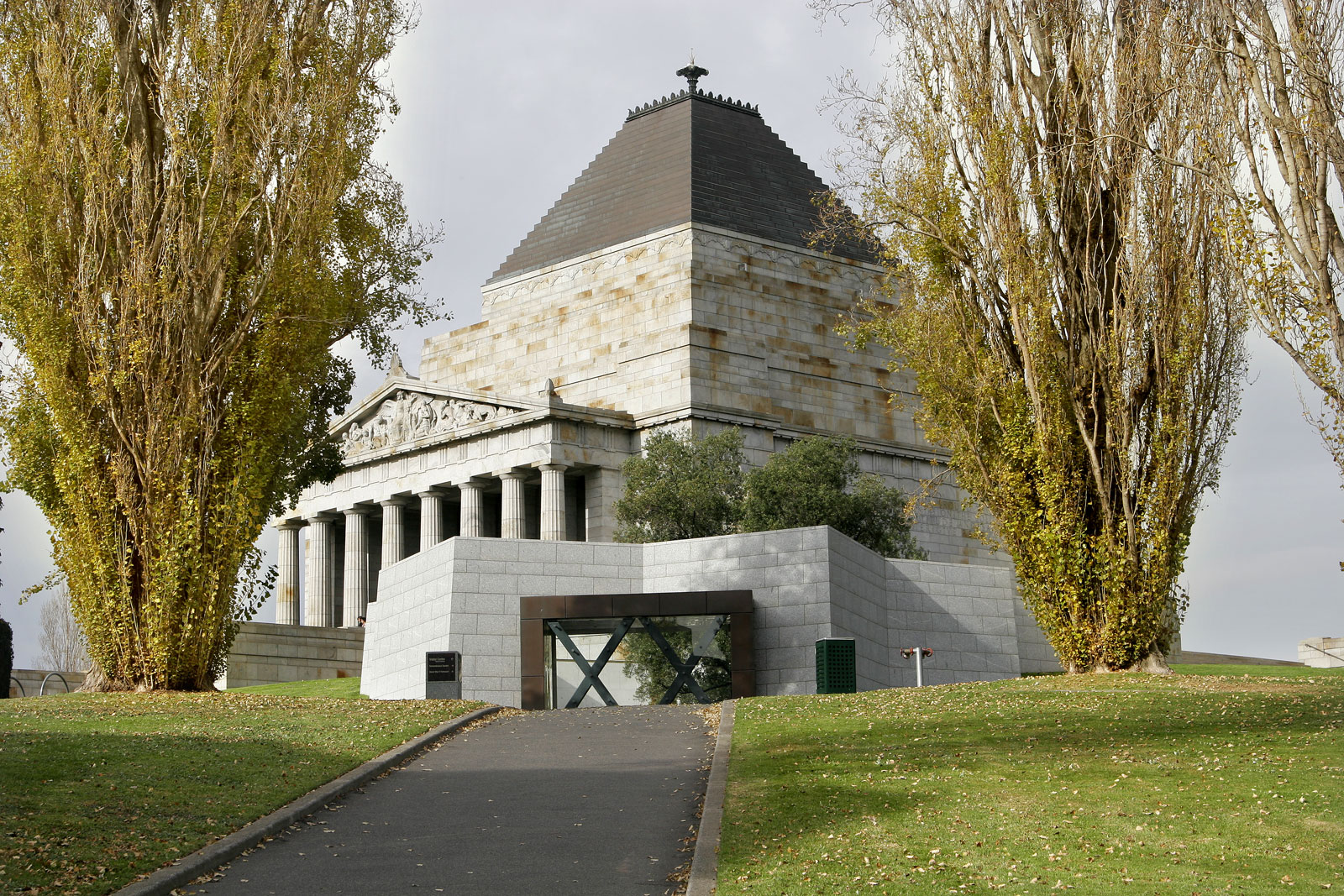
2004 Victorian Architecture Medal, Shrine of Remembrance Visitor Centre and Garden Courtyard by Ashton Raggatt McDougall

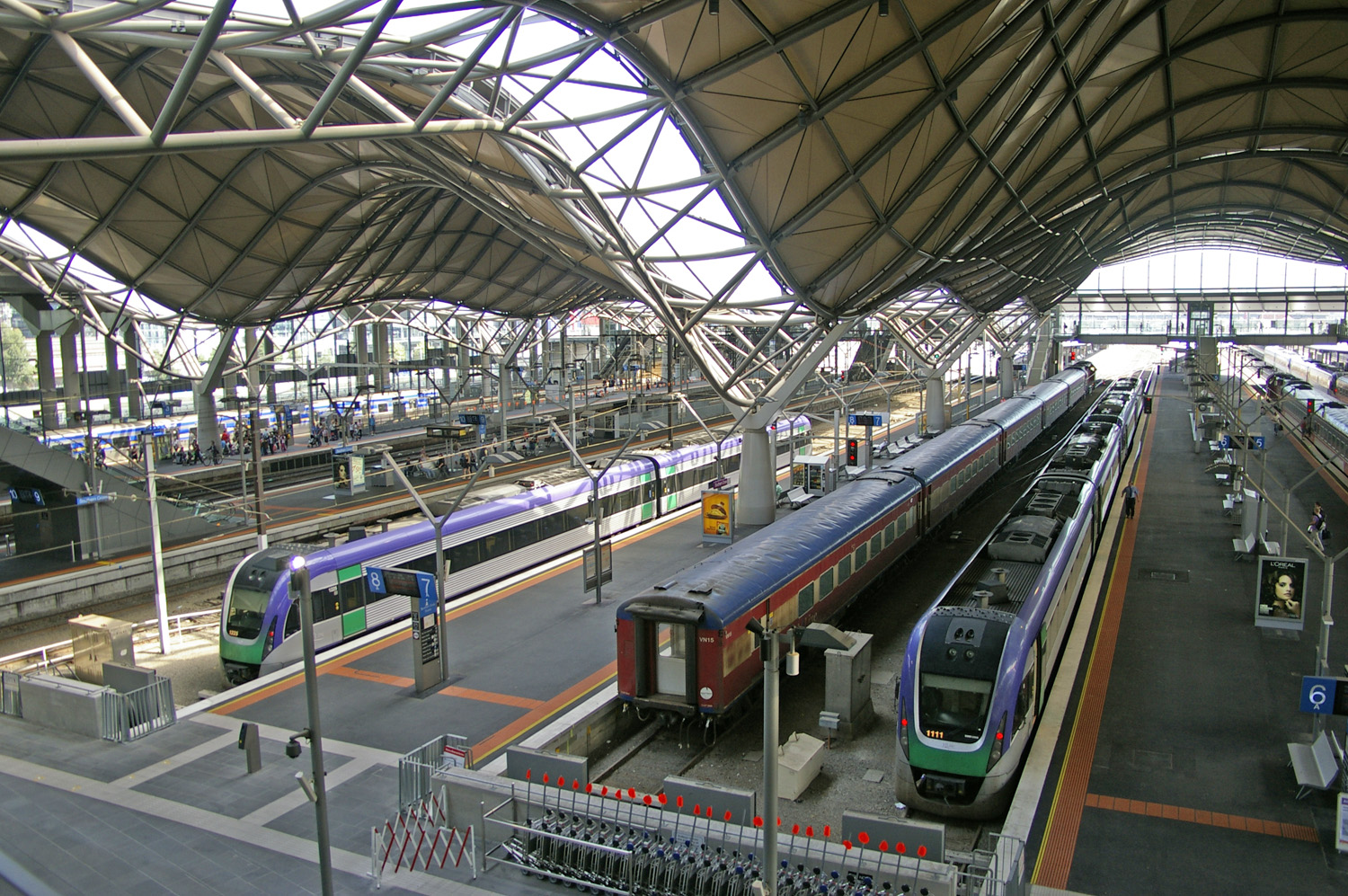
2007 Victorian Architecture Medal, Southern Cross Station by Grimshaw Jackson Joint Venture

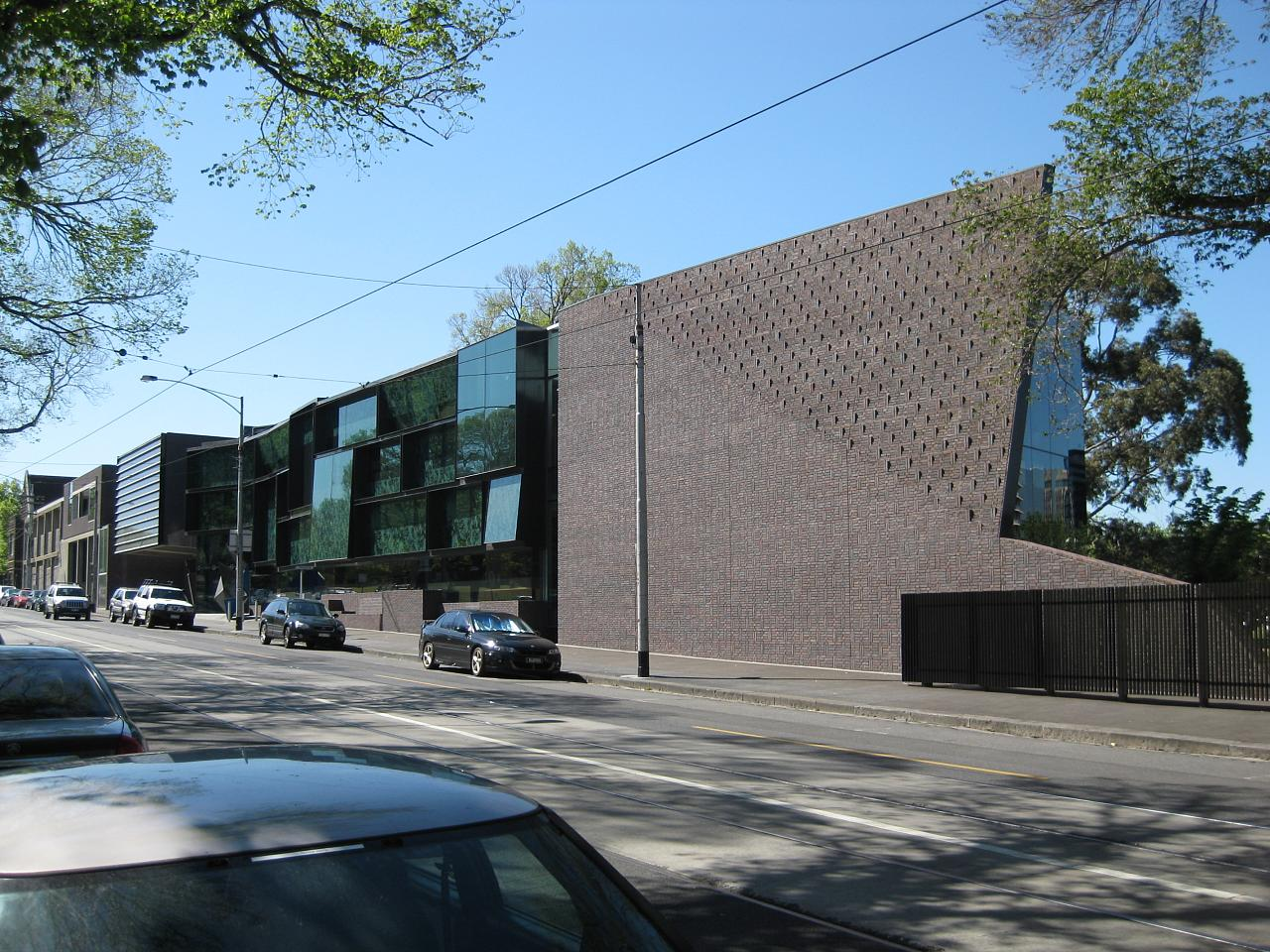
2008 Victorian Architecture Medal, Nigel Peck Centre, Melbourne Grammar School by John Wardle Architecture

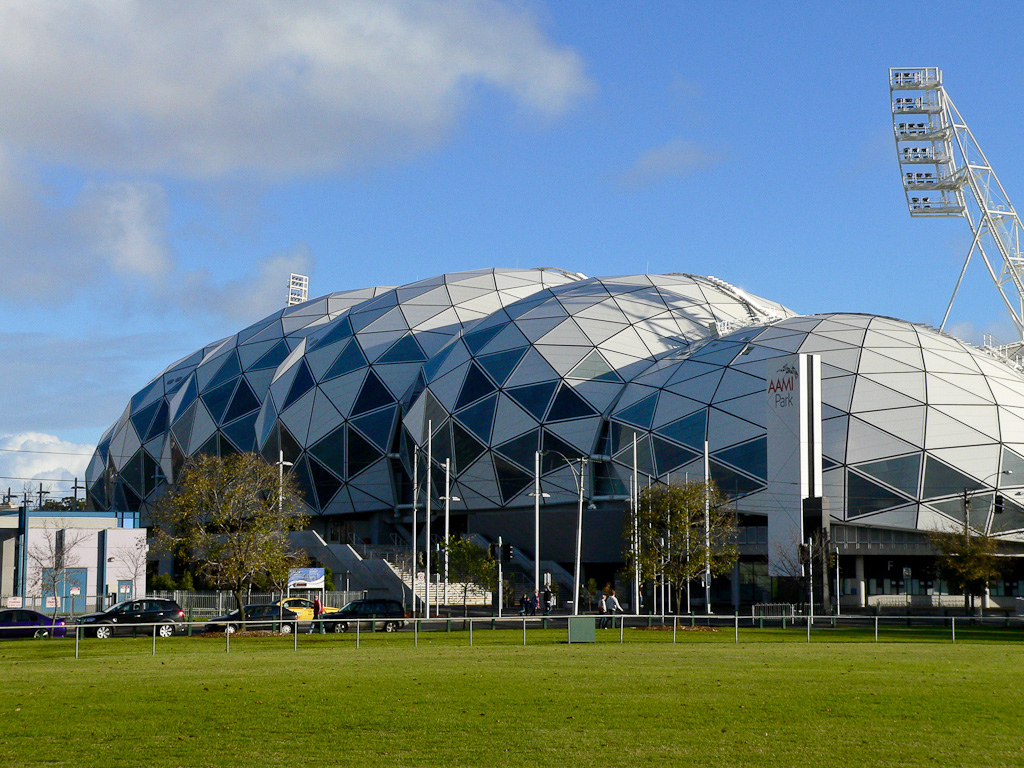
2011 Victorian Architecture Medal, AAMI Park by COX

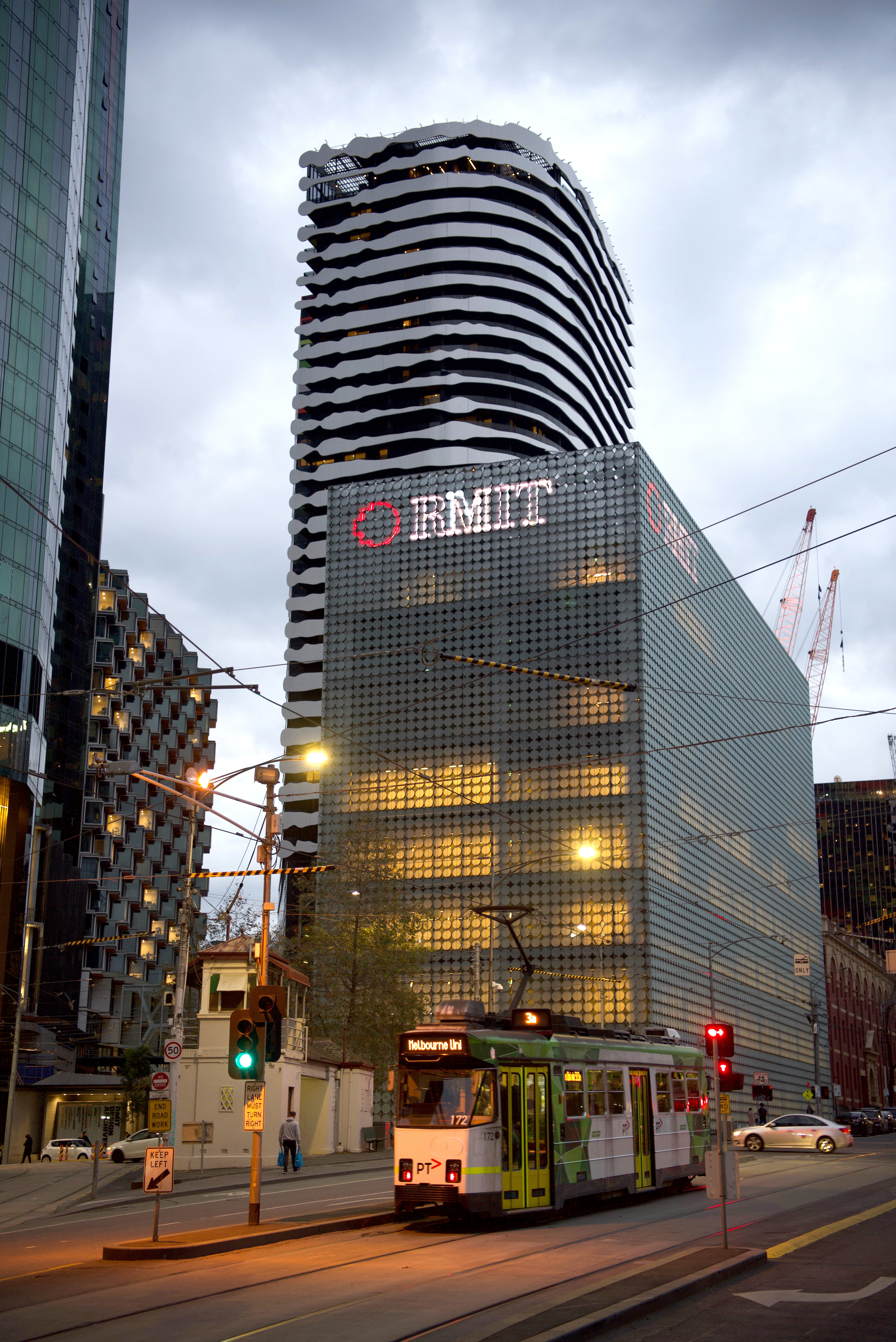
2013 Victorian Architecture Medal, RMIT Design Hub by Sean Godsell

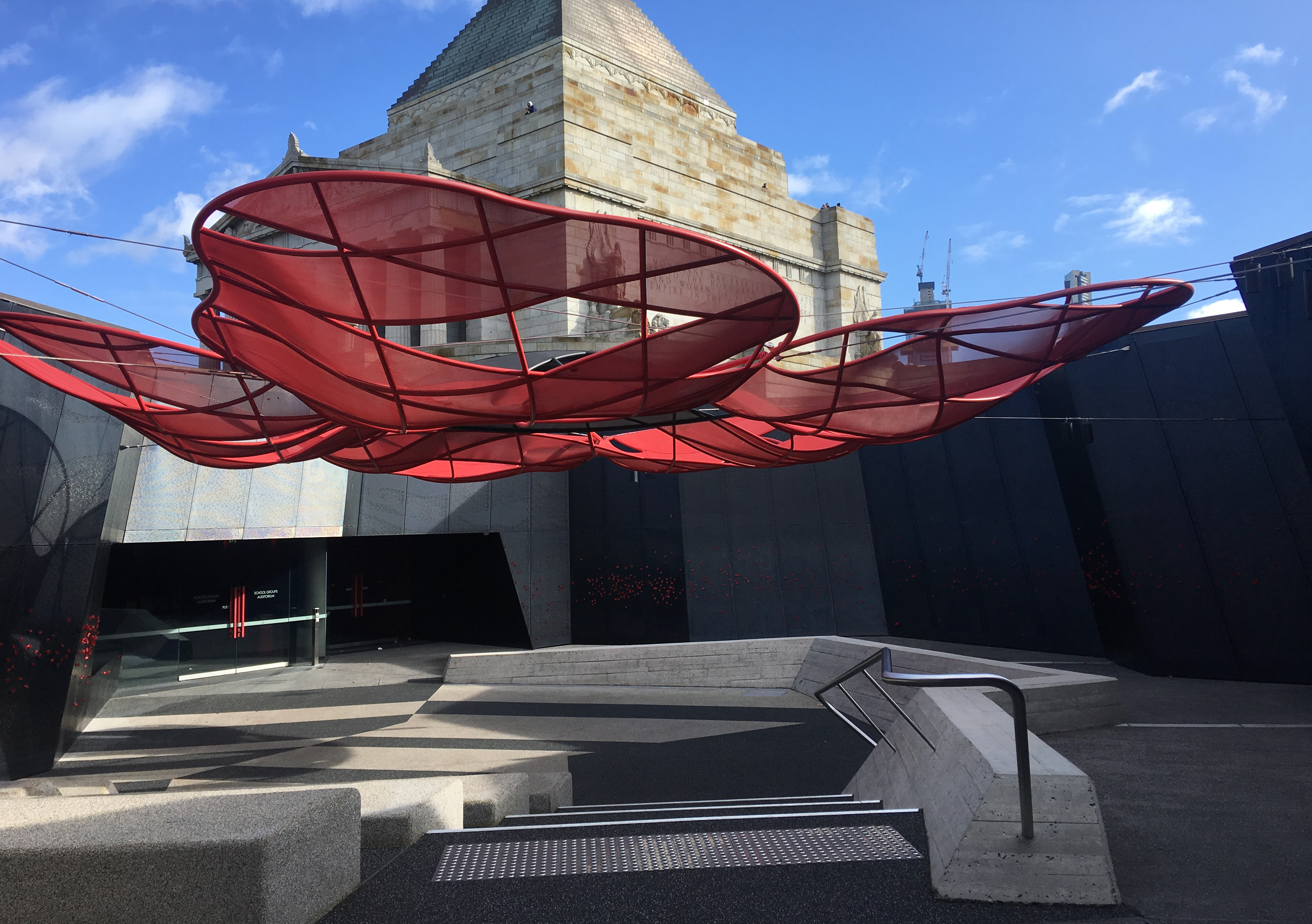
2015 Award, Shrine of Remembrance (Education Courtyard), Melbourne, Victoria

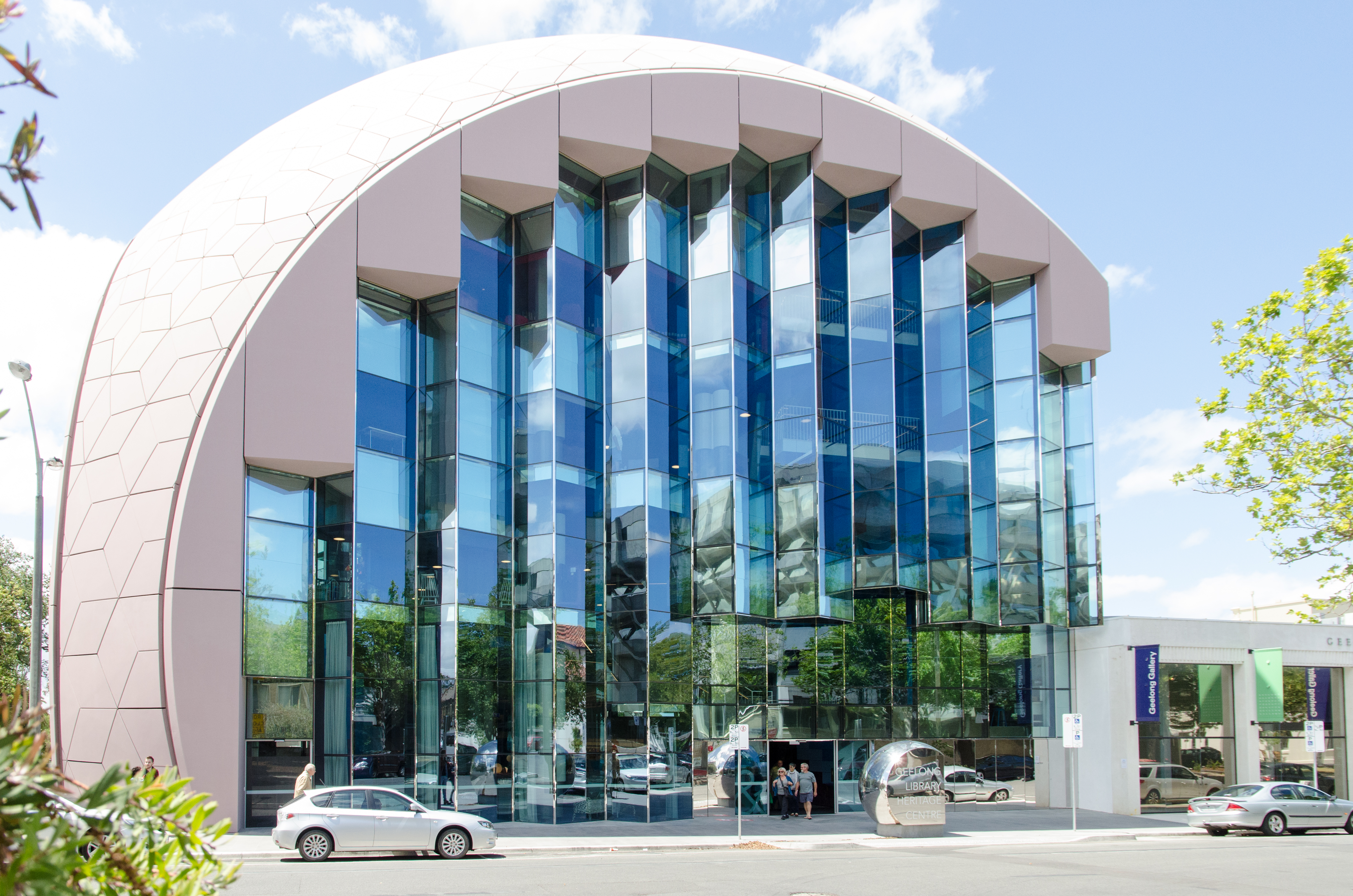
2016 Victorian Architecture Medal, Geelong Library and Heritage Centre by Ashton Raggatt McDougall

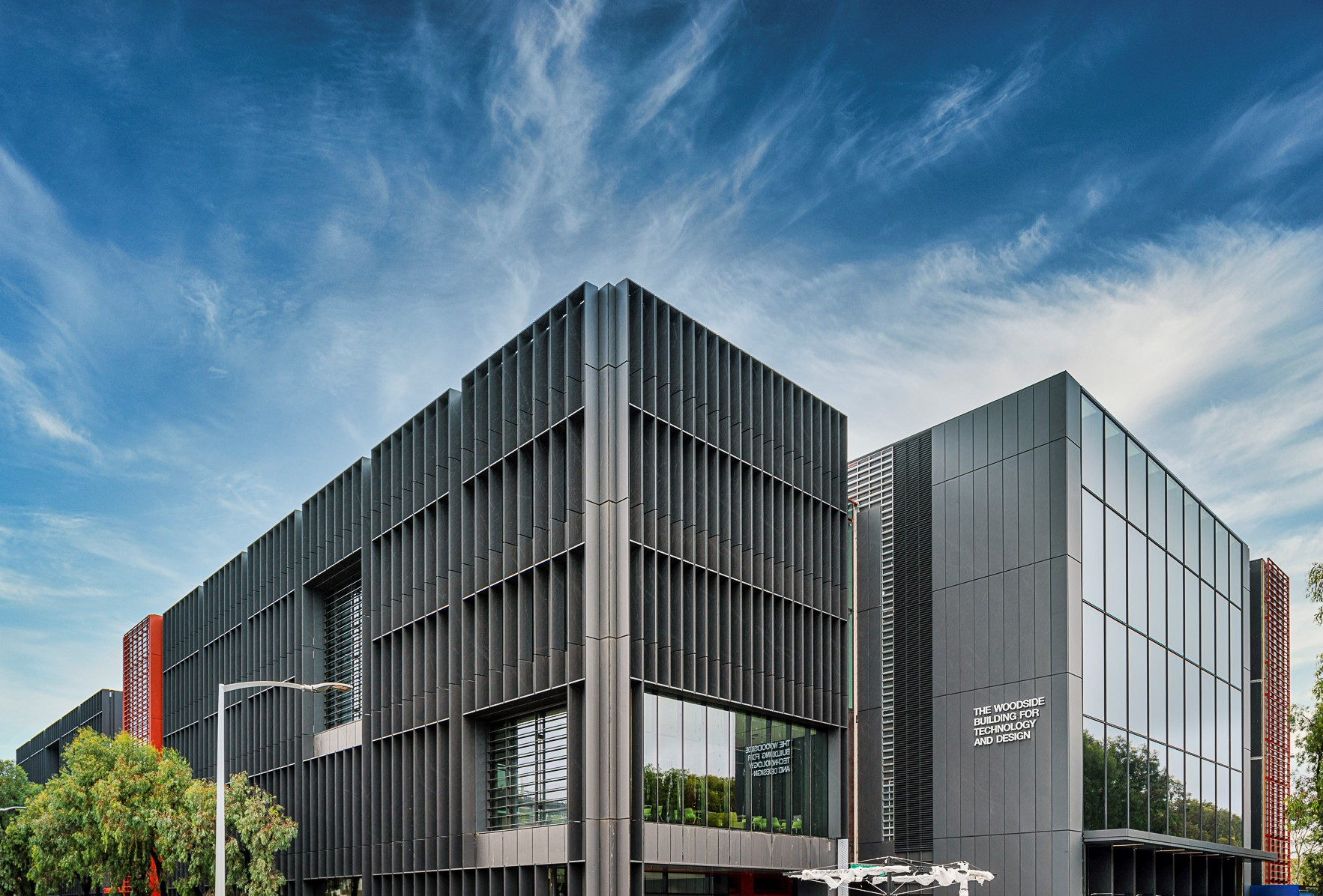
2021 Victorian Architecture Medal, Woodside Building for Technology and Design at Monash University by Grimshaw

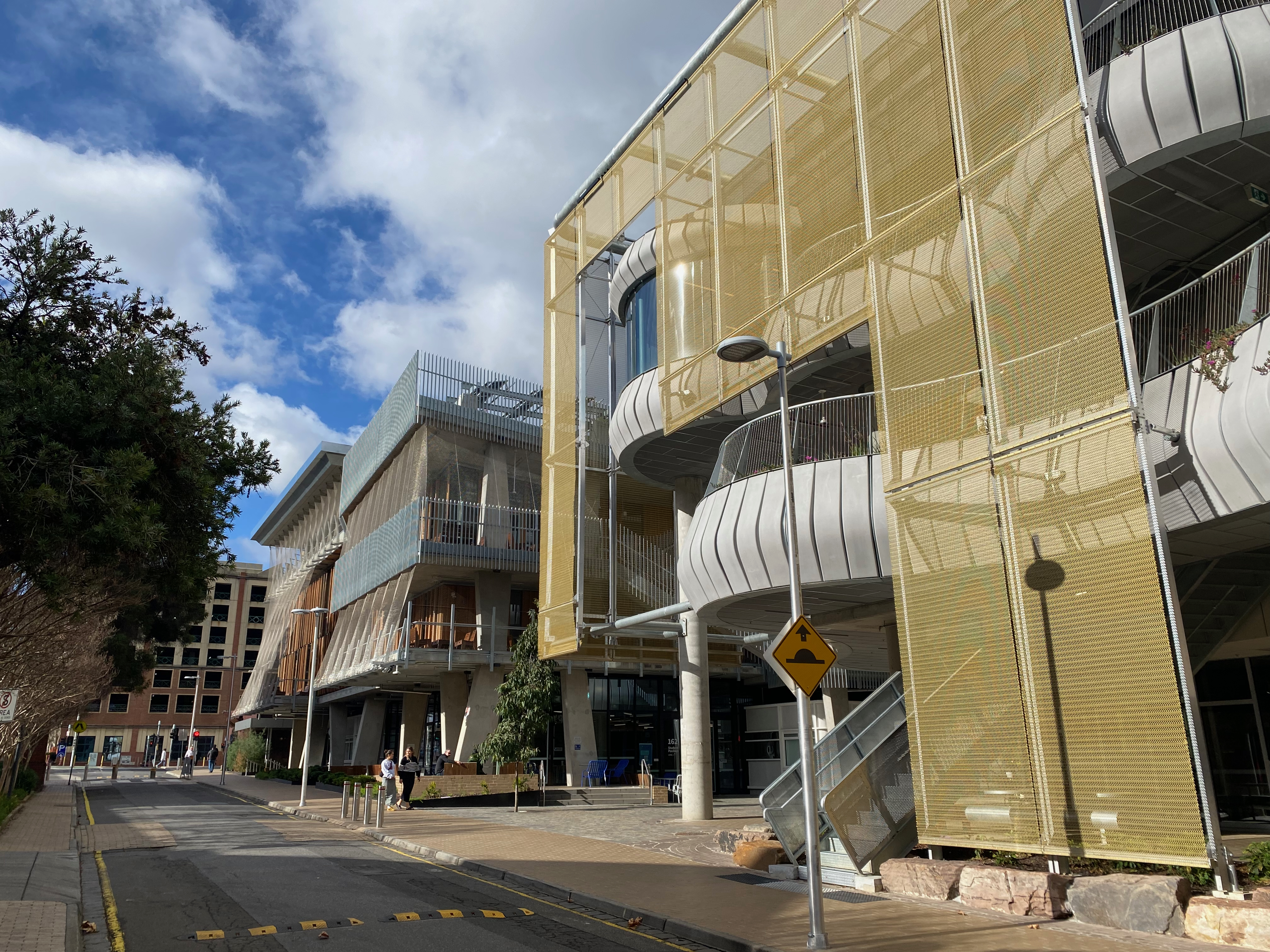
2023 Victorian Architecture Medal, University of Melbourne Student by Precinct by a team led by Lyons

== Architecture Medal winners (1943–1986) ==
Following World War II and the holding of singular Chapter awards in 1954, the Street Architecture Medal was dropped as an award, with more than 12 years passing since it was last judged and awarded in 1942. Perhaps responding to the rise of modernism and new concerns in architecture it may have been seen as outmoded and out–of–date. Roy Grounds was awarded the 1954 Victorian Architecture Medal for his own house and four flats.

Bronze Medals were again awarded for general building, urban and housing categories when annual awards were restarted in 1964 through until 1980. Between 1981 and 1986 only Citation and Merit Awards were given, and no further medals until the rebooting of the Victorian Architecture Medal in 1987.

Bronze Medal winners by Year 1943 to 1986
Year	Winner	Project	Location	Other AIA awards
1986–1981	No Bronze Medals awarded (Citations and Merit Awards only)			
1980	Harry Seidler & Associates	Ringwood Cultural Centre (now Karralyka Centre)	22A Mines Road, Ringwood East	
1980	Peter Crone	Mater Christi College Administration Building	28 Bayview Road, Belgrave	
1979	Edmond and Corrigan	Resurrection School	402 Corrigan Road, Keysborough	Buildings Award, Bronze Medal, 1979 "Judged an outstanding contribution to architecture" (text on cast medal)
1978	McIntyre, McIntyre and Partners	Knox City Shopping Centre	425 Burwood Highway, Wantirna South	Buildings Award, Bronze Medal, 1978 (joint winner)
1978	Daryl Jackson and Evan Walker	State Bank Staff College	83 Stotts Lane, Frankston South (Baxter)	Buildings Award, Bronze Medal, 1978 (joint winner)
1976–1977	No Awards			
1975	Yuncken Freeman	BHP House	140 William Street, Melbourne	Award of Merit, 1973; Bronze Medal, 1975; National Award for Enduring Architecture, 2005; Maggie Edmond Enduring Architecture Award, 2005
1974	Daryl Jackson and Evan Walker	Resource Centre, Methodist Ladies' College, Melbourne	Glenferrie Road, Kew	Bronze Medal, 1974 (Medal and diploma in General Buildings category)
1973	Chief Architect, Public Works Department in association with Daryl Jackson and Evan Walker	Princes Hill High School	Arnold Street, Princes Hill	Bronze Medal, 1973 (Medal and diploma in General Buildings category)
1972	Kevin Borland & Associates	Preshil School	395 Barkers Road, Kew	Bronze Medal in General Buildings category, 1972
1971	No Award			
1970	Yuncken Freeman	State Government Offices	Treasury Place and Macarthur Street, East Melbourne	Bronze Medal for Excellence, 1970
1970	Graeme Gunn	Molesworth Street Townhouses (Merchant Builders)	76 Molesworth Street, Kew	Bronze Medal, 1970
1970	Daryl Jackson and Evan Walker	Lauriston Girls' School	Huntingtower Road, Armadale	Bronze Medal, 1970
1969	Tompkins, Shaw and Evans	Southland Shopping Centre (now Westfield Southland)	1239 Nepean Highway, Cheltenham	Bronze Medal, 1969
1968	McGlashan Everist	John and Sunday Reed House (Heide II)	Heide Gallery of Modern Art, 7 Templestowe Road, Bulleen	Bronze Medal, 1968; Maggie Edmond Enduring Architecture Award, 2016
1967	Yuncken Freeman	Royal Insurance Group Building	430—444 Collins Street, Melbourne	General Building Category
1967	Neil Clerehan	Fenner House	288 Domain Road, South Yarra	Bronze Medal, 1967 (Medal and diploma in Single Houses category, 'Outstanding House of the Year')
1966	Graeme Gunn	Richardson House	14 Brewster Street, Essendon	Bronze Medal, 1966 (Medal and diploma in Single Houses category)
1966	Donald Hendry Fulton	BP Administration Building, Westernport Refinery	220-350 The Esplanade, Crib Point	Bronze Medal, 1966 (Medal and diploma in General Buildings category)
1965	Hassell McConnell & Partners	Channel O Television Studios	Corner of Springvale Road and Hawthorn Road, East Hawthorn (104-168 Hawthorn Road, Forest Hill)	Bronze Medal, 1965 (Medal and diploma in General Buildings category)
1965	Charles Duncan	Williams House	4 Glenard Drive, Eaglemont	Bronze Medal, 1965 (Medal and diploma in Single Houses category)
1964	Bates Smart and McCutcheon	New Zealand Insurance Building (demolished)	493 Bourke Street, Melbourne	Bronze Medal, 1964 (Medal and diploma in General Buildings category)
1964	Guilford Bell and Neil Clerehan	Simon House	33 Daveys Bay Road, Mt Eliza	Bronze Medal, 1964 (Medal and diploma in Single Houses category)
1963	McGlashan Everist	Grimwade House	28–54 Dundas Street, Rye	Bronze Medal, 1963 (Medal and diploma in Single Houses category)
1962–1955	No Awards			
1954	Grounds, Romberg & Boyd	House and Four Apartments (Roy Grounds House)	24 Hill Street, Toorak	RVIA Architecture Award, 1954 (Medal inscription on building)
1953–1943	No Awards			

== RVIA Street Architecture Medal winners (1929—1942) ==
Predecessor (and equivalent) to Victorian Architecture Medal
Year	Winner	Project	Location
1942	Meldrum and Noad	Western Branch of the National Bank of Australasia Limited	460 Collins Street, Melbourne (corner of William Street)
1941	Stephenson and Turner	King George V Jubilee Maternal and Infant Welfare Pathological Building	Hospital for Women, 720 Swanston Street, Carlton (since demolished)
1940	Edward F. Billson	Sanitarium Health Food Company Building	3475 Warburton Highway, Warburton
1939	Peck & Kempter and AC Leith & Associates	Heidelberg Town Hall and Municipal Offices	275 Heidelberg Road, Ivanhoe
1938	Bates, Smart and McCutcheon	Second Church of Christ, Scientist, Melbourne	41 Cookson Street, Camberwell
1937	Leighton Irwin and Roy K. Stevenson	Royal Australasian College of Surgeons Building	250—290 Spring Street, East Melbourne
1936	Godfrey and Spowers (design architects: Norman H Seabrook and WR Godfrey)	Bank of New South Wales Building	368–374 Collins Street, Melbourne (demolished 1970s)
1935	A&K Henderson and Partners (Kingsley Henderson)	Shell Corner	163 William Street (corner of Bourke Street), Melbourne, (demolished 1958)
1934	Bates, Smart and McCutcheon (Walter Osbert McCutcheon)	Buckley & Nunn Building (now part of David Jones)	294–296 Bourke Street, Melbourne
1933	Sidney Smith, Ogg and Serpell	Port of Melbourne Authority Building (now Port Apartments)	29–31 Market Street, Melbourne
1932	Bates, Smart and McCutcheon	Australian Mutual Provident Society (AMP) Building	425 Collins Street, Melbourne
1931	A&K Henderson and Partners	Lyric House	250 Collins Street, Melbourne
1930	E. Evan Smith, Chief Architect; designed and constructed by the Public Works Department of Victoria	Emily McPherson College of Domestic Economy (RMIT Building 13)	405 Russell Street, Melbourne
1929	WAB Blackett and WB Forster	Francis House	107 Collins Street, Melbourne

Notes:

RVIA Street Architecture Medal

1. No Street Architecture Medals were awarded during the war years and post–war years between 1943 and 1953.
2. 5 of 12 awards were for buildings on Collins Street, Melbourne.
3. 10 of 12 awards were for buildings in Melbourne's CBD.

== Gallery of Street Architecture Medal winning projects ==
Selected Street Architecture Medal Winners 1929—1942
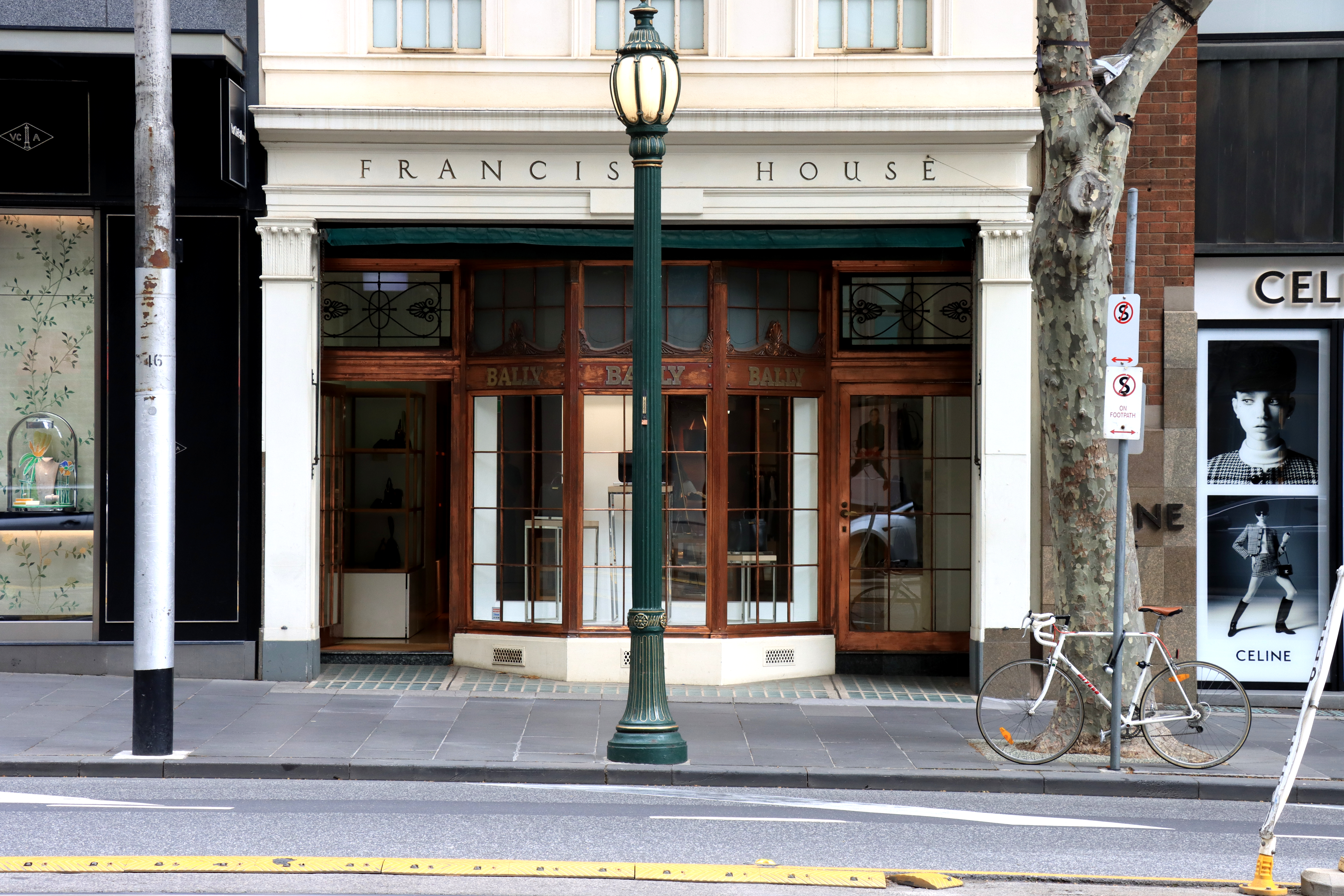
1929 Medal, Francis House by WAB Blackett and WB Forster

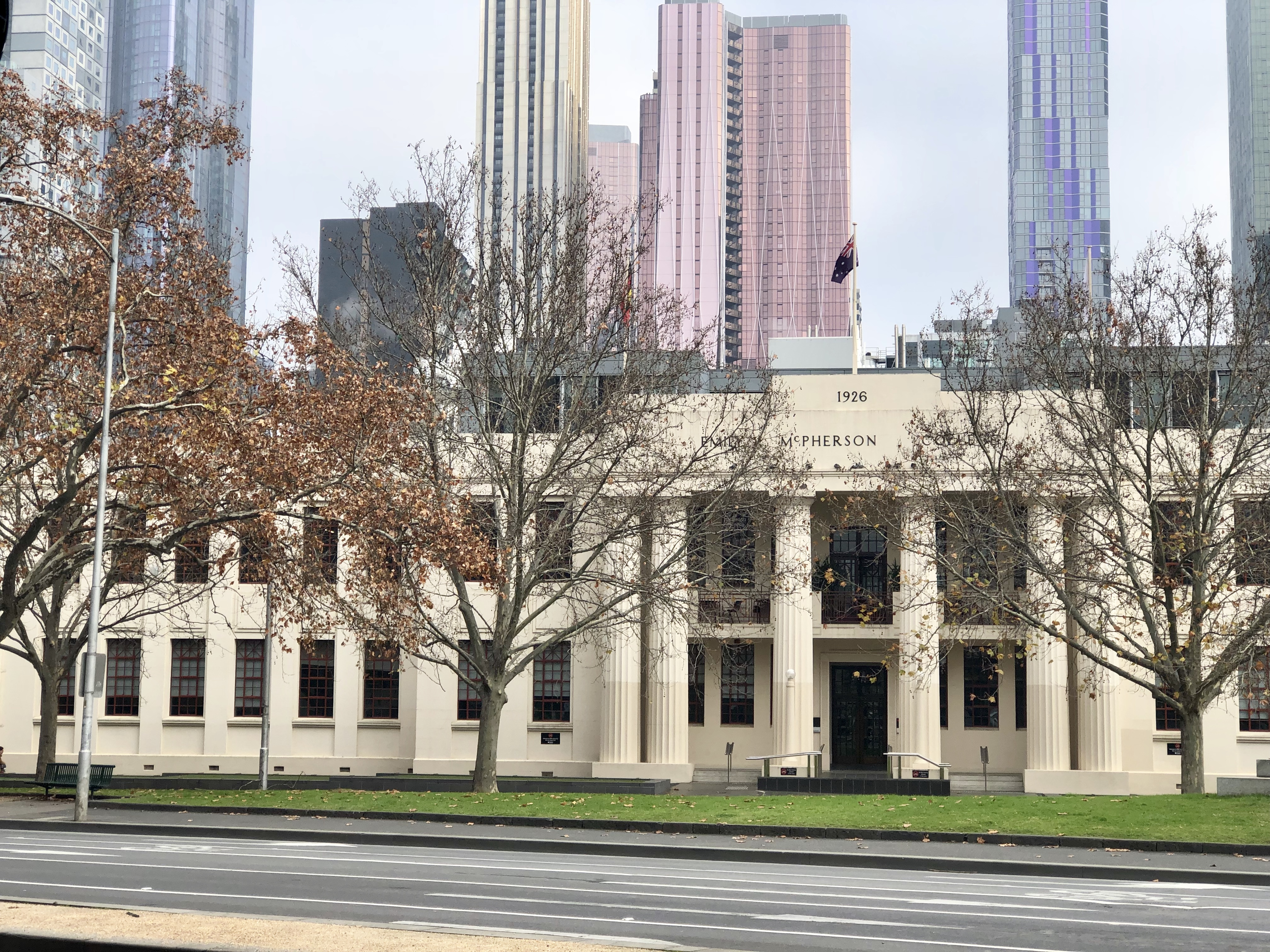
1930 Medal, Emily McPherson College of Domestic Economy by E. Evan Smith, Chief Architect

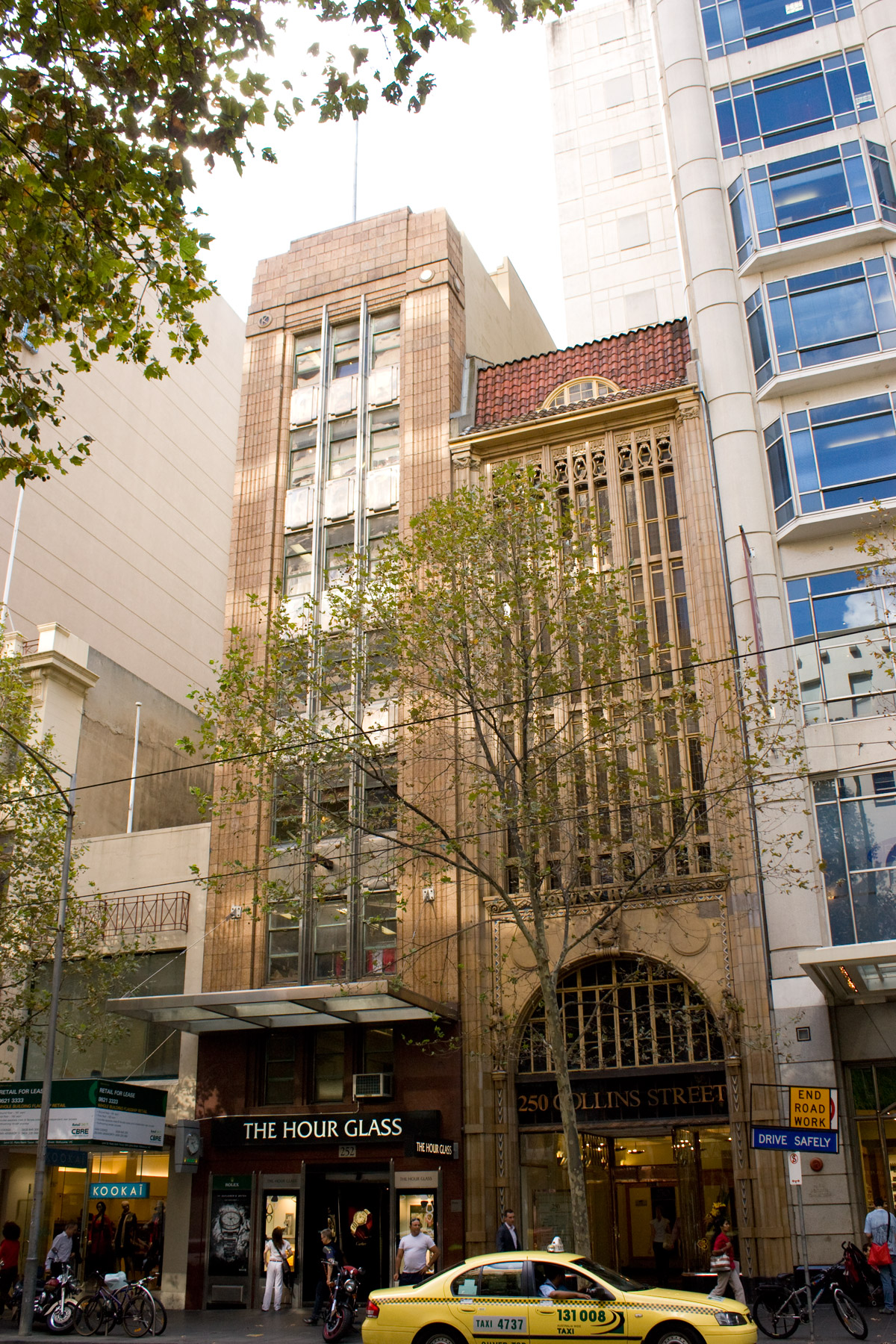
1931 Medal, Lyric House (right) by A&K Henderson and Partners by Bates, Smart and McCutcheon

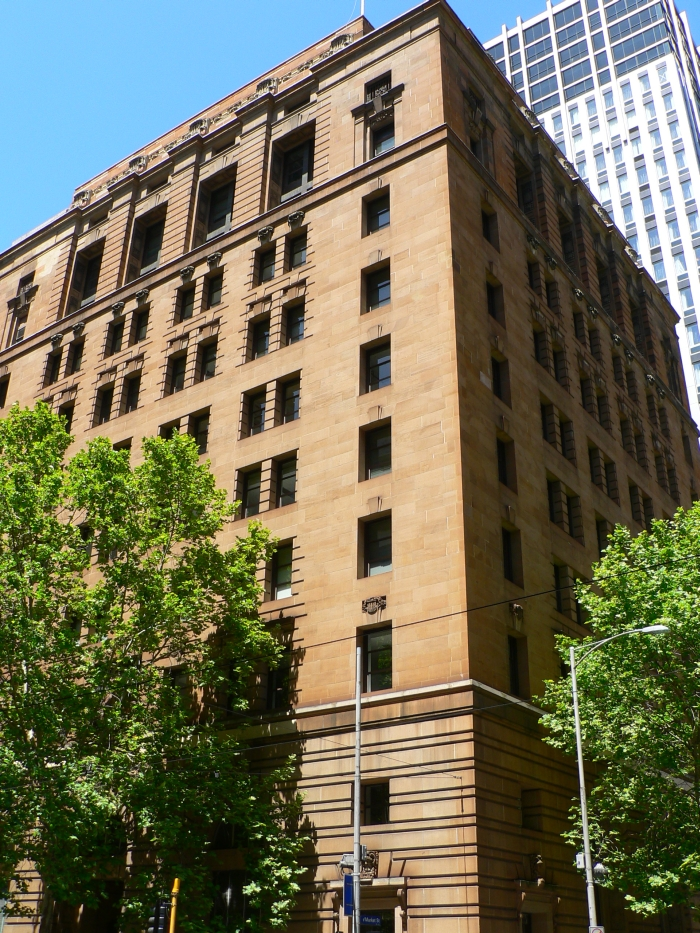
1932 Medal, Australian Mutual Provident Society (AMP) Building by Bates, Smart and McCutcheon

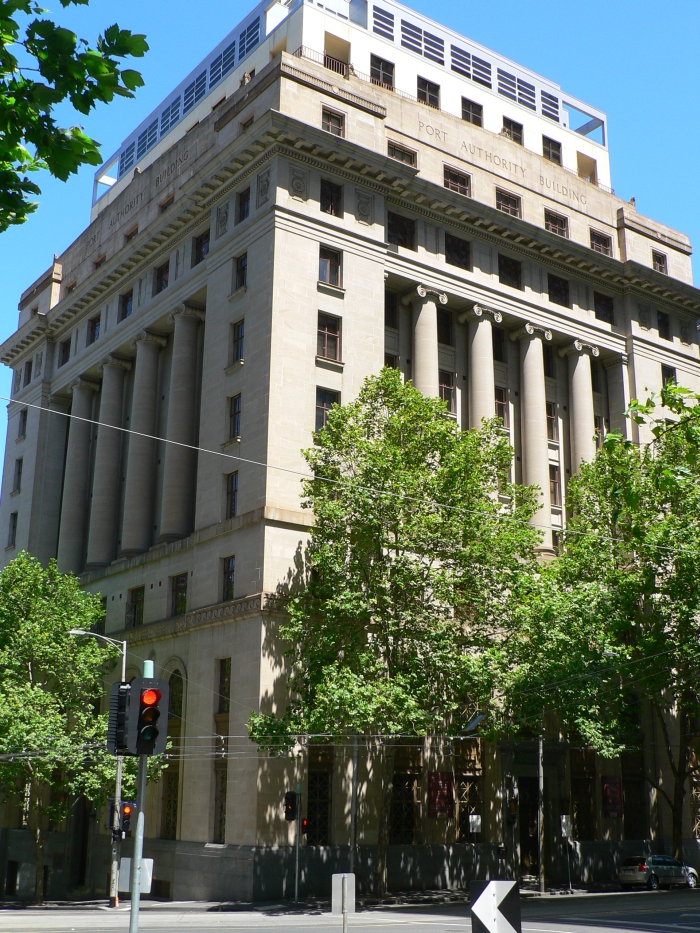
1933 Medal, Port Authority Building, Market Street by Sidney Smith, Ogg and Serpell

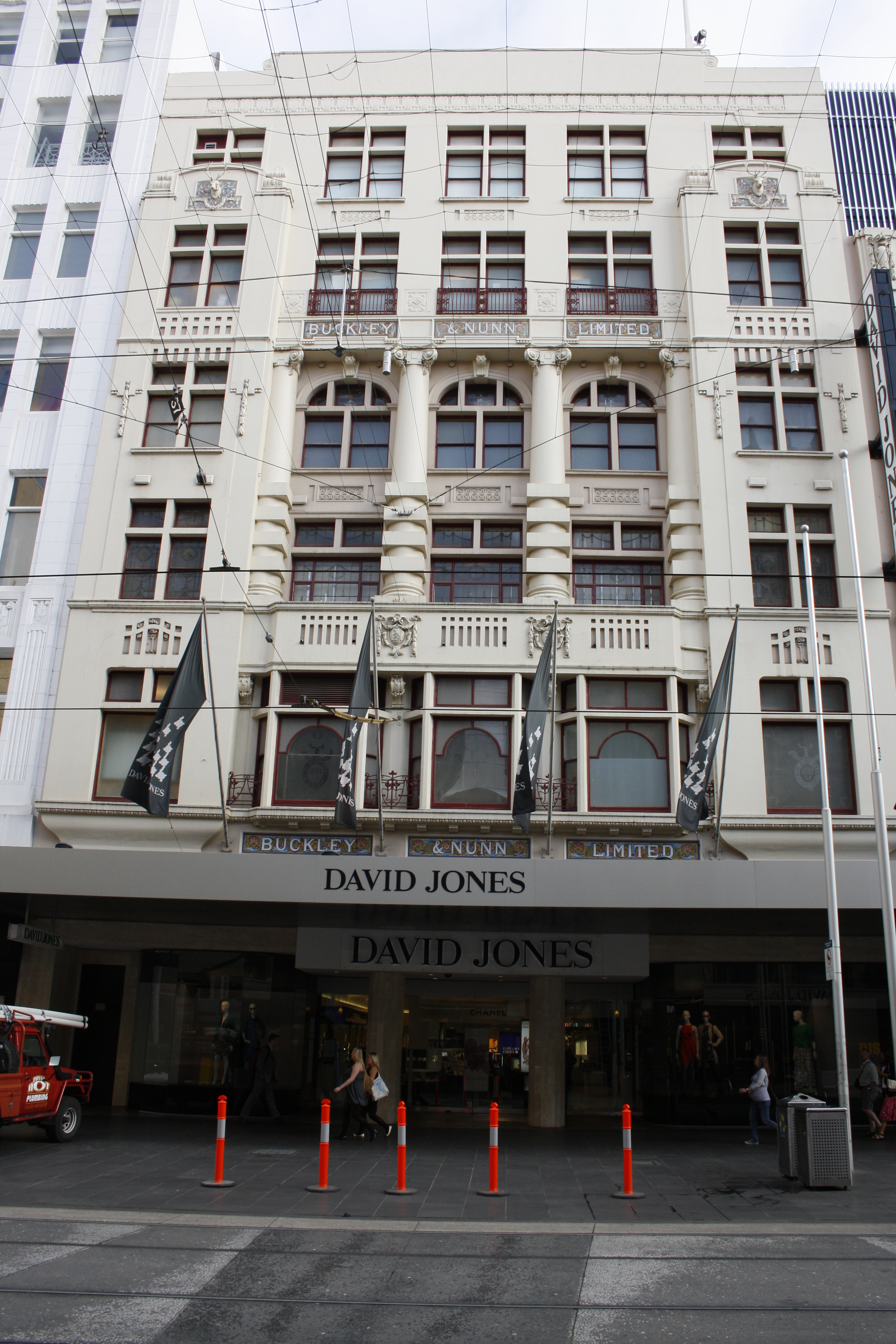
1934 Medal, Buckley & Nunn Building, Bourke Street by Bates, Smart and McCutcheon

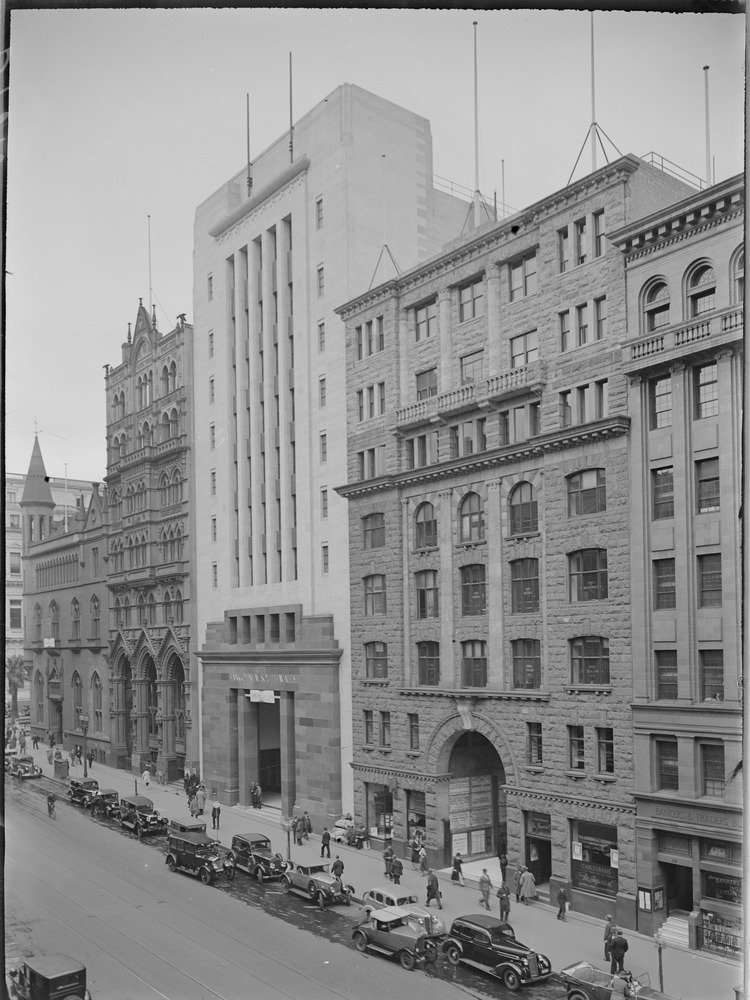
1936 Medal, Bank of New South Wales building, Melbourne, Godfrey & Spowers

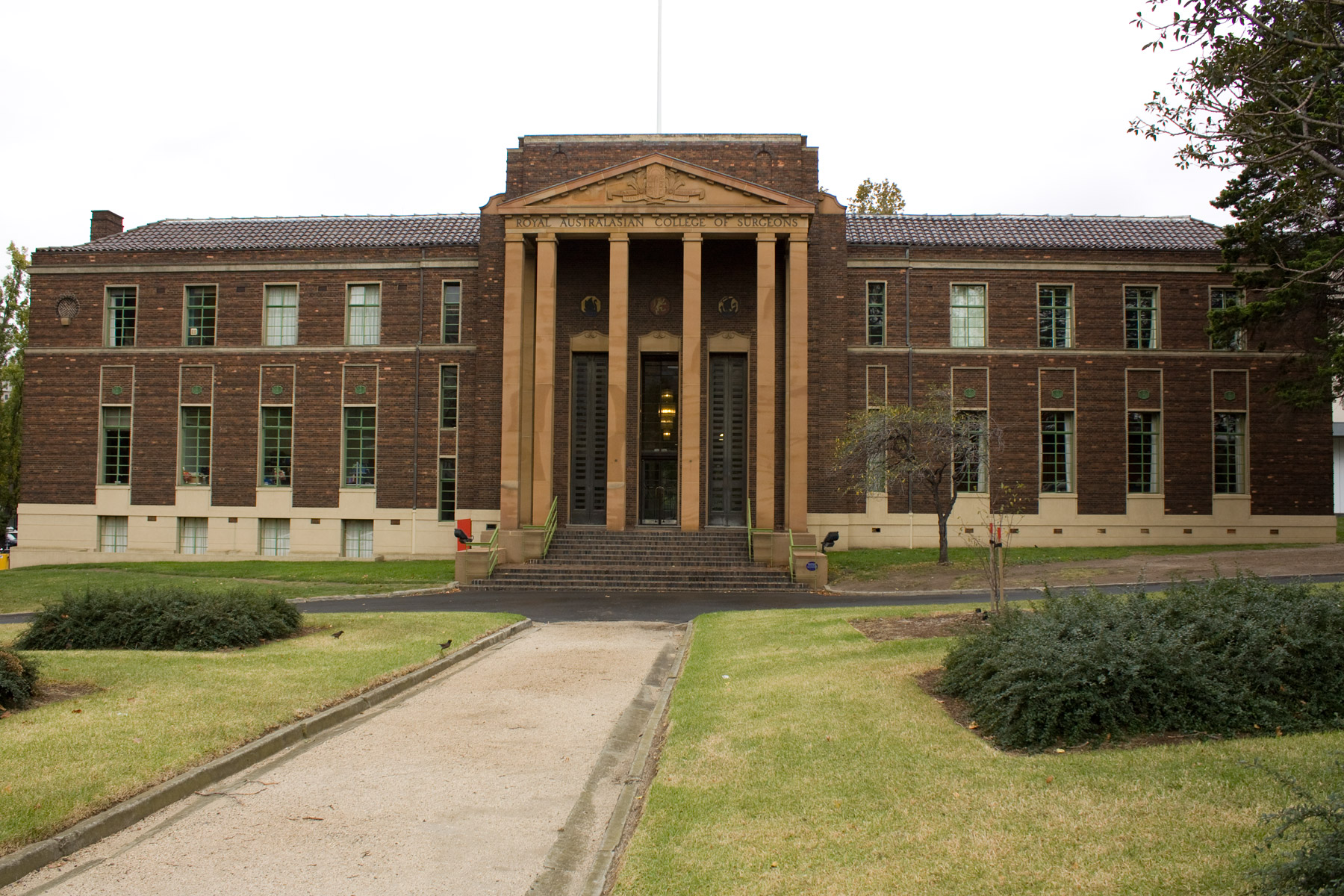
1937 Medal, Royal Australasian College of Surgeons Building by Leighton Irwin and Roy K. Stevenson

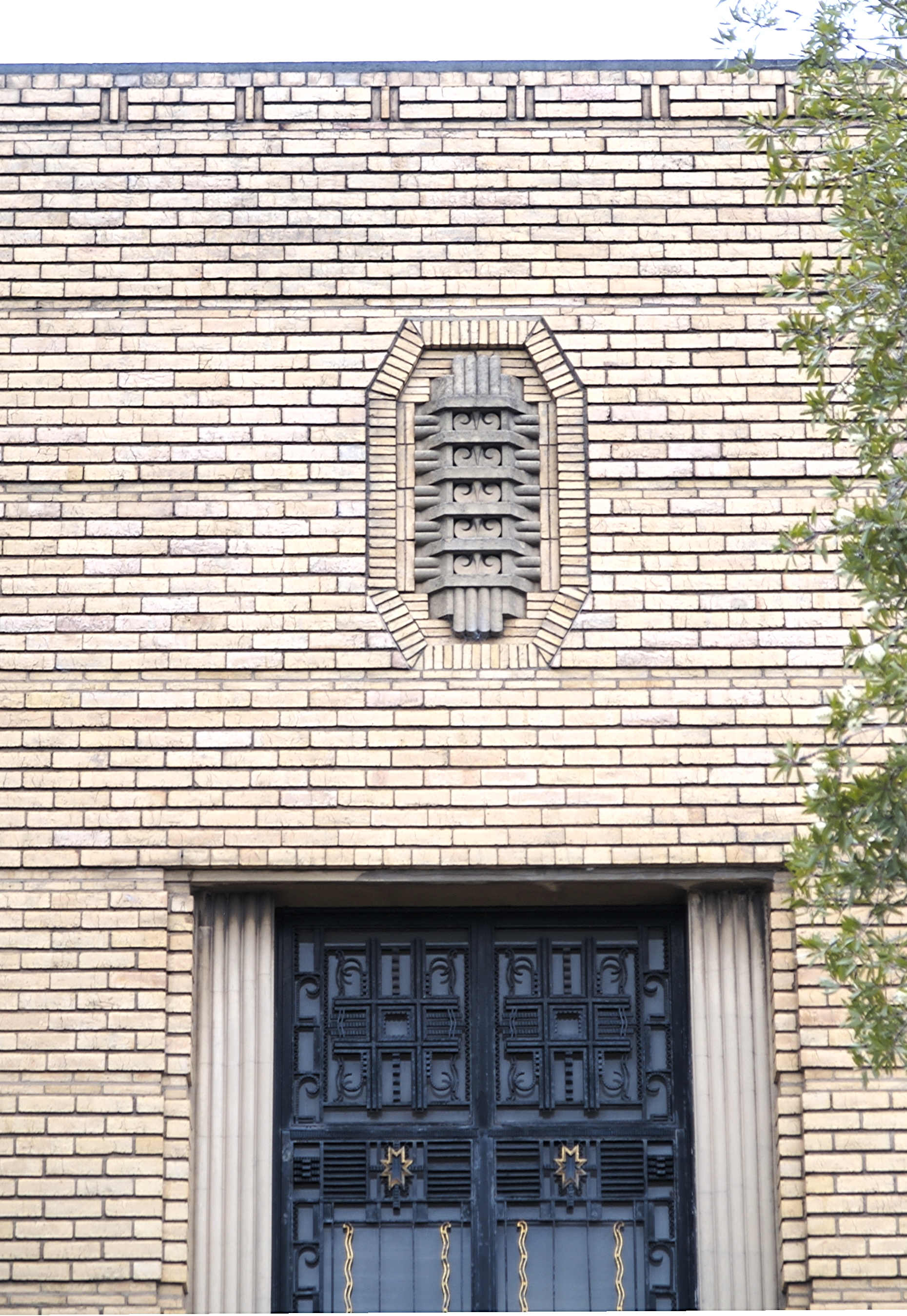
1938 Medal, Second Church of Christ, Scientist, Camberwell by Bates, Smart and McCutcheon

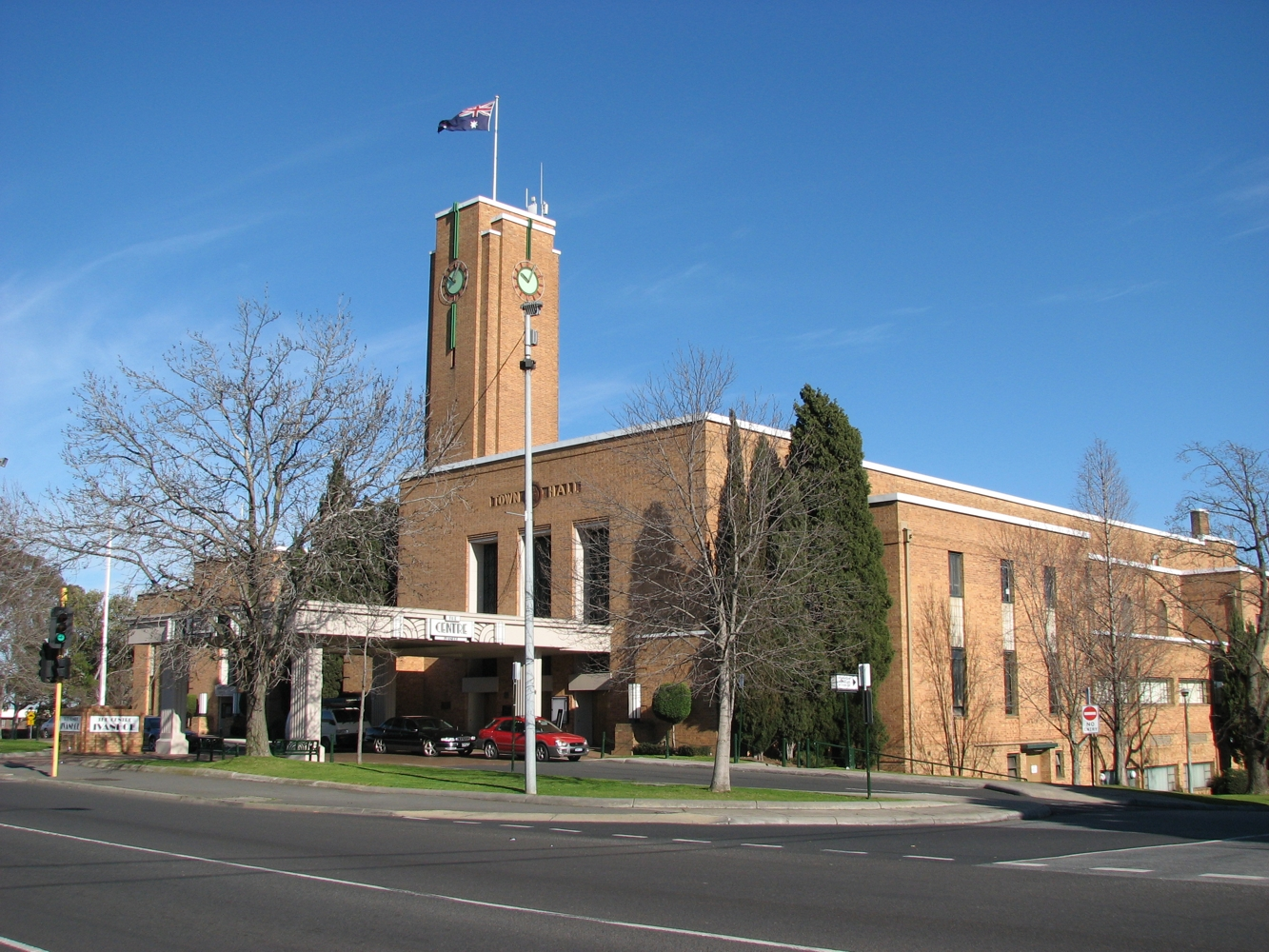
1939 Medal, Heidelberg Town Hall by Peck & Kempter and AC Leith & Associates

== See also ==
- Australian Institute of Architects
- Australian Institute of Architects Awards and Prizes
- Victorian Architecture Awards
- William Wardell Award for Public Architecture
- Maggie Edmond Enduring Architecture Award
- Melbourne Prize
- Australian Institute of Architects Gold Medal
- Robin Boyd Award
