= Wood Marsh =

Wood Marsh Architecture, styled Wood | Marsh Architecture, is a Melbourne-based Australian architectural practice founded by Roger Wood and Randal Marsh in 1983.

== History ==
The company was founded by Roger Wood and Randal Marsh, both Melbourne-born in the 1950s, and who completed a Bachelor of Architecture at the Royal Melbourne Institute of Technology. After working for practices such as Williams Boag and Daryl Jackson, the two established their own private practice "Biltmoderne", along with Dale Jones-Evans in 1983. Jones-Evans left the firm in 1987, from which emerged Wood Marsh Architects.

Projects that led to Wood Marsh's prominence in the 1980s were their designs for nightclub interiors, including Metro, Inflation and Chasers.

== Notable projects ==
=== Public ===
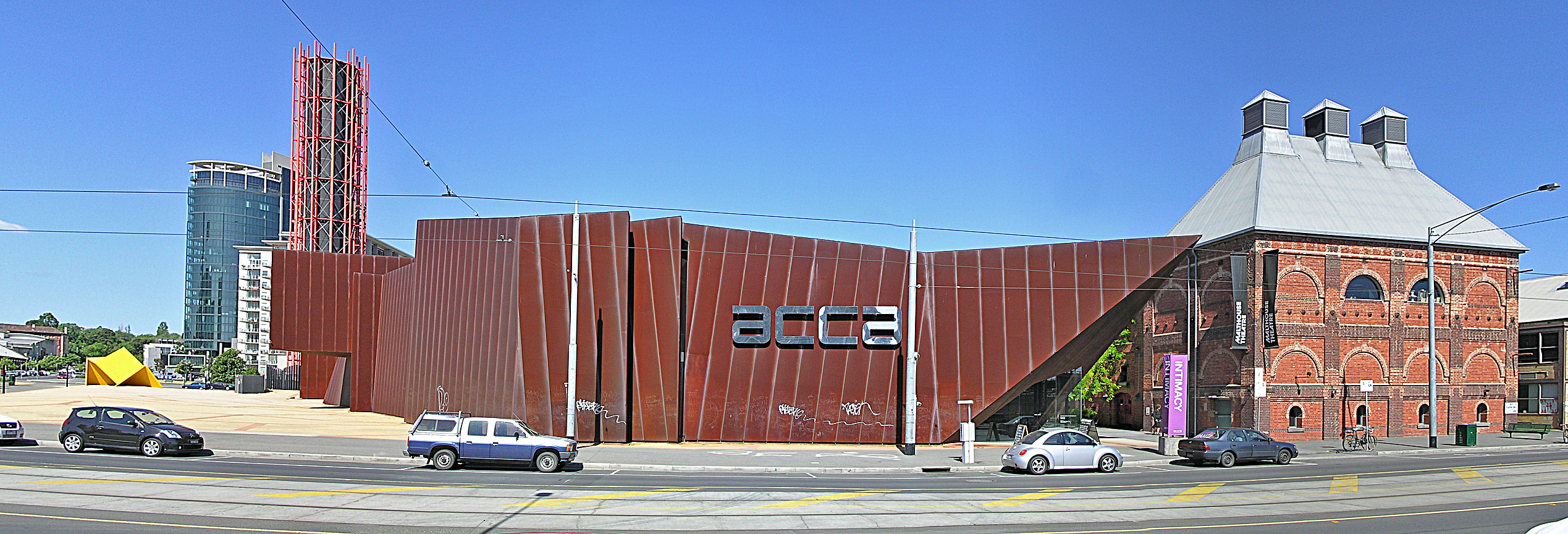
The Australian Centre for Contemporary Art

ACCA (Australian Centre for Contemporary Art) was completed in 2002 and is located in Southbank, Melbourne, Australia. It is a gallery presenting a diverse range of creative visual art.

=== Multiresidential ===
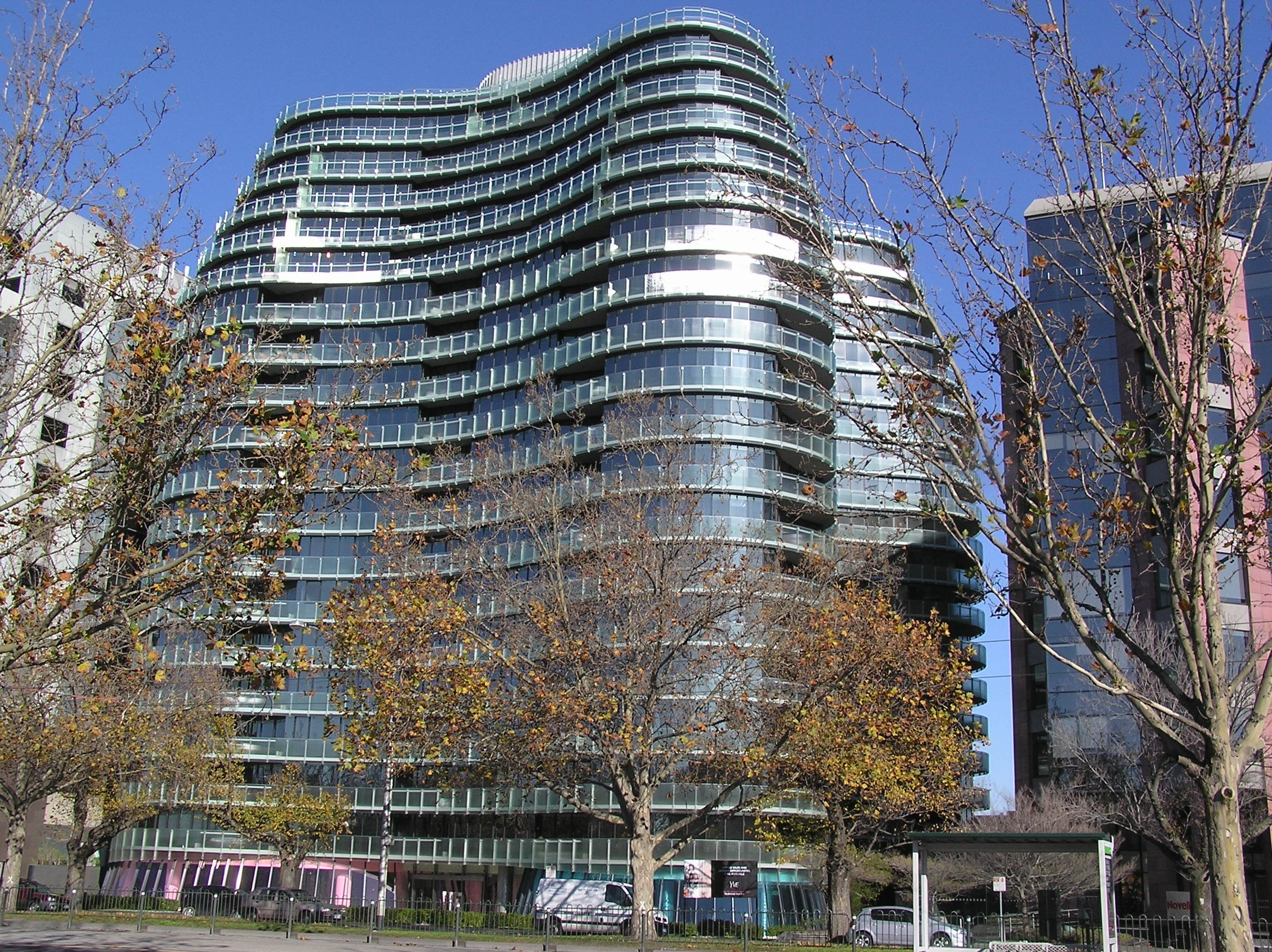
YVE Apartment

YVE apartment was completed in 2006 and awarded the Victorian Architectural Medal.

=== Residential ===
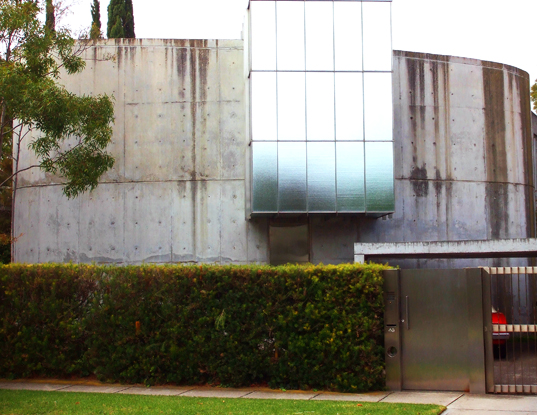
Gottlieb House

Gottlieb House completed 1990, won the 1994 Victorian Residential Architecture Award.

== Awards ==
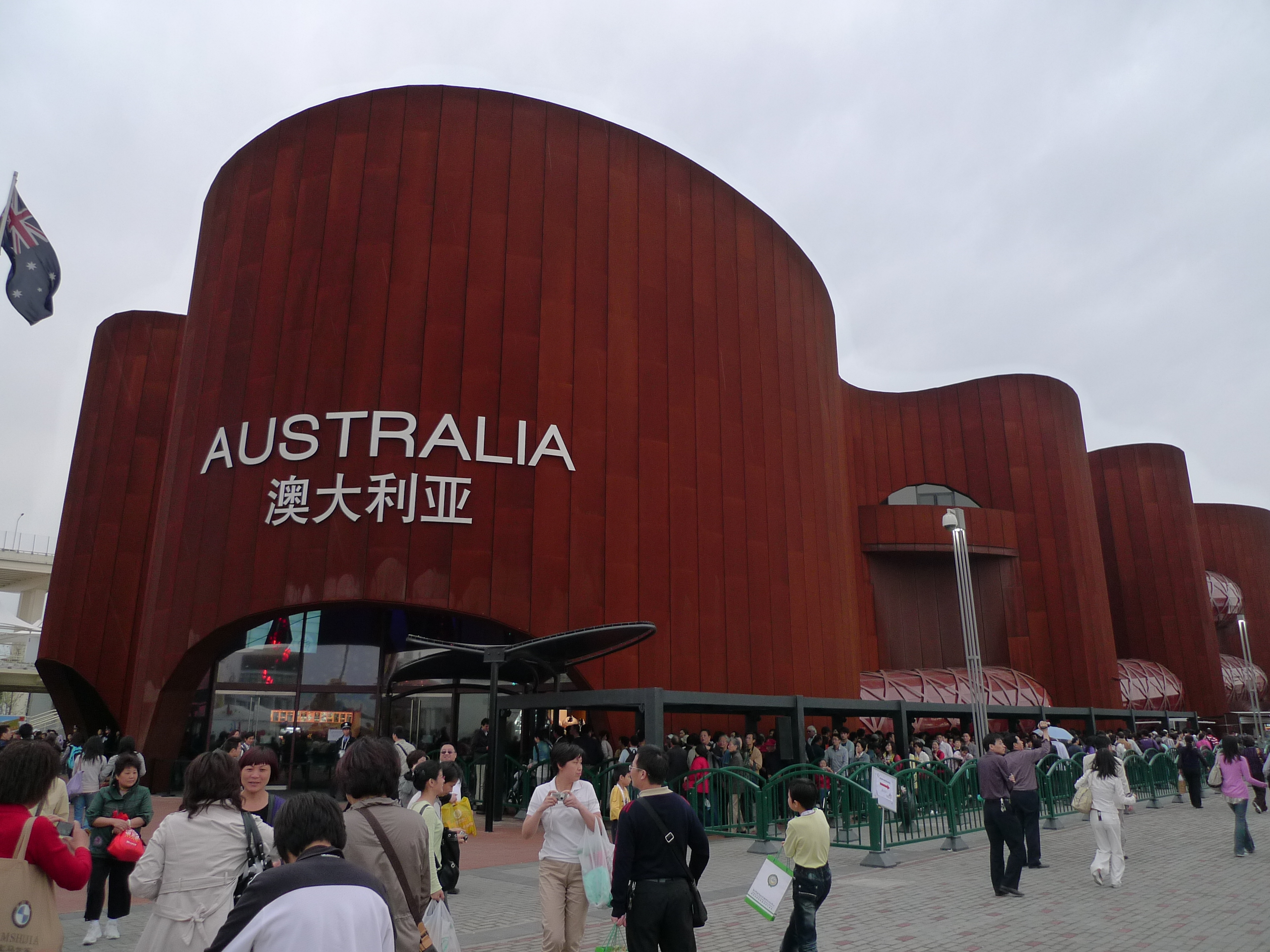
Australia Pavilion of Expo 2010, Shanghai

Wood Marsh's work to 2018 has received over 40 awards, some special awards, but mostly from the Victorian and the National Australian Institute of Architects . These include the top local award, the Victorian Architecture Medal, in 1998 and 2006.

- 1985: RAIA Victoria, Merit Award for Outstanding Architecture, Commercial New Category, Inflation Nightclub
- 1987: RAIA Victoria, Award of Merit for Outstanding Architecture, Residential New Category, Choong House
- 1989: RAIA Victoria, Award of Merit for Outstanding Architecture, Residential Alterations and Extensions Category, Frantzeskos House
- 1991: RAIA Victoria, Award of Merit for Outstanding Architecture, Residential New Category, Kyritsis House
- 1994: RAIA Victoria, Award of Merit for Outstanding Architecture, Residential New Category, Gottlieb House
- 1996: RAIA Victoria, Harold Desbrowe-Annear, Residential Architecture Award, Cromwell Road Apartments
- 1997: RAIA Victoria, Award of Merit for Outstanding Architecture, Institutional New Category, Deakin University, Burwood Campus
- 1998: RAIA National Awards, Sir Zelman Cowen Award for Public Architecture, Commendation: RMIT Building 220, Bundoora Campus
- 1998: RAIA Victoria, William Wardell Award for Public Architecture, RMIT Building 220, Bundoora Campus
- 1998: Australian Institute of Landscape Architects, Australian Native Landscapes Project Award, Eastern Freeway Extension Sound Barriers for VicRoads, Merit Award
- 1998: RAIA National Awards, Walter Burley Griffin Award for Urban Design, Eastern Freeway Extension Sound Barriers
- 1998: RAIA Victoria, Victorian Architecture Medal, Eastern Freeway Extension Sound Barriers
- 1998: RAIA Victoria, Joseph Reed Award for Urban Design, Eastern Freeway Extension Sound Barriers
- 1999: Museum of Contemporary Art (NSW), Seppelt Contemporary Art Awards 99, Visual Art Environmental Design Object Design, Category: Environmental Design
- 1999: RAIA Victoria, Award of Commendation for Outstanding Architecture, Interior Architecture, Taylor Residence
- 1999: RAIA Victoria, Award of Merit for Outstanding Architecture, Residential: Alterations and Extensions, Curtis House
- 2000: Australian Council of Building Design Professions, Award of Commendation, Urban Design Australian Award, Docklands Infrastructure
- 2000: RAIA National Awards, Commendation, Urban Design, Docklands Infrastructure
- 2000: RAIA Victoria, Award of Merit, Urban Design, Docklands Infrastructure
- 2000: RAIA Victoria, Award of Merit for Outstanding Architecture, Residential: Alterations and Extensions, A & G Curtis House
- 2001: RAIA National Awards, Lachlan Macquarie Award: Heritage, Mansion Hotel: Werribee Park
- 2001: RAIA National Awards, Award for Interior Architecture: Mansion Hotel: Werribee Park
- 2001: RAIA Victoria, John George Knight Award Heritage Architecture, Mansion Hotel: Werribee Park
- 2001: RAIA Victoria, Marion Mahony Award Interior Architecture, Mansion Hotel: Werribee Park
- 2002: RAIA Victoria, Commercial: Alterations and Extensions Architecture Award, Prince of Wales: Health Spa
- 2003: RAIA Victoria, Institutional Architectural Award, Australian Centre for Contemporary Art
- 2003: RAIA National Awards, Australian Centre for Contemporary Art, Short listed by National Jury
- 2004: RAIA National Awards, Commendation, Residential Buildings, Barro House
- 2004: RAIA Victoria, Residential Architectural Award, Barro House
- 2005: RAIA Victoria, Residential Architecture Award, Yarra's Edge Tower 5
- 2006: RAIA Victoria, Harold Desbrowe-Annear, Residential Architecture Award, Yve Apartments
- 2006: RAIA Victoria, Victorian Architecture Medal, Yve Apartments
- 2007: RAIA, National Residential Architecture Award: Multiple Housing, Yve Apartments
- 2007: RAIA Victoria, Residential Architecture Award: Multiple Housing, ISIS Apartments
- 2009: AIA National Awards, The Frederick Romberg Award for Residential Architecture: Multiple Housing, Balancea Apartments
- 2009: AIA National Awards, Residential Architecture Award: Multiple Housing, Balancea Apartments
- 2010: AIA Victoria, Joseph Reed Award – Urban Design, Eastlink Freeway
- 2010: Premier's Design Awards, Victoria, Premier's Design Mark, Eastlink Freeway
- 2010: AIA National Awards, Urban Design Commendation, Eastlink Freeway
- 2010: AIA Victoria, Sir Osborn McCutcheon Award: Commercial Architecture, Port Phillip Estate
- 2010: AIA National Awards, Commercial Architecture, Port Phillip Estate
- 2010: AIA National Awards, Interior Architecture, Port Phillip Estate
- 2010: AIA National Awards, The Colorbond Award for Steel Architecture, Australian Pavilion Shanghai Expo
- 2012: AIA Victoria, Residential Architecture Award, New category, Flinders House
- 2012: AIA Victoria, Interior Architecture Award, Flinders House
- 2012: AIA Victoria, Commendation, Multiple Housing, Aerial
- 2014: AIA Victoria, Residential Architecture Award, New category, Portsea House
- 2015: AIA Victoria, Residential Architecture Award, Multiple Housing, Domain Road Apartments
- 2015: AIA Victoria, Interior Architecture Award, Domain Road Apartments
- 2015: AIA Victoria, Commendation, Commercial Architecture, RACV Torquay
- 2016: Australian Institute of Landscape Architects, National Awards: Award of Excellence for Tourism, Penguins Plus Viewing Area, Phillip Island (with Tract Consultants)
- 2018: AIA Victoria, Residential Architecture Award, New category, Towers Road House

== See also ==
- Architecture of Australia
