= Victorian School Building Authority =

Government agency of Victoria, Australia

- Type: Government agency
- Founded: August 2016
- Headquarters: 33 St Andrews Place, Melbourne, Australia
- Key people: Tom Kirkland (CEO)
- Parent: Department of Education (Victoria)
- Website: www.schoolbuildings.vic.gov.au

The Victorian School Building Authority (VSBA) is a group in the Victorian Department of Education which is responsible for the construction of new government schools and infrastructure improvements at existing schools. It was established by the Andrews Government as part of the 2016 Victorian Budget.

Between 2017 and 2026, the authority opened 121 new schools in the state and completed over 2000 upgrade or expansion projects at existing schools.

A number of the VSBA's new schools are so-called "vertical schools" on inner-city sites, a new concept in Victoria.

== History ==
During the 2014 Victorian state election, the Opposition Leader Daniel Andrews promised $1.3 billion for new schools and school upgrades. The School Building Authority was established as part of the 2016 state budget with $1.1 billion allocated for school infrastructure. This included $42 million to build and reopen Richmond High School, a school that was controversially closed 22 years earlier by the government of Jeff Kennett. The huge projects for school construction came as a result and recommendation of an analysis published by the Grattan Institute. They found that due to the state's rapid population growth, Victorian schools would need to absorb an extra 190,000 students between 2016 and 2026, requiring 7,200 new teachers and 140 to 220 new schools to be built. In 2017, Education Minister James Merlino said the state needed to absorb an additional 90,000 students over the next five years.

The removal of trees for the construction of Beaumaris Secondary College caused controversy in 2016.

In the lead-up to the 2018 state election, Andrews announced the Authority would build 100 new schools over the next eight years in order to meet Melbourne's population growth, with 45 schools to be built over the next term of government. The schools would mainly be built in the city's growing outer suburbs at an additional cost of $850 million.

In July 2022, the state government released tenders for eleven new schools. In October 2022 during the 2022 state election, Andrews announced funding for a further 25 new state schools that would be built in Victoria by 2026, with 90 schools upgraded or expanded, at a cost of $1.6 billion. This was to meet the government's commitment to build 100 new schools by 2026.

== Architecture ==
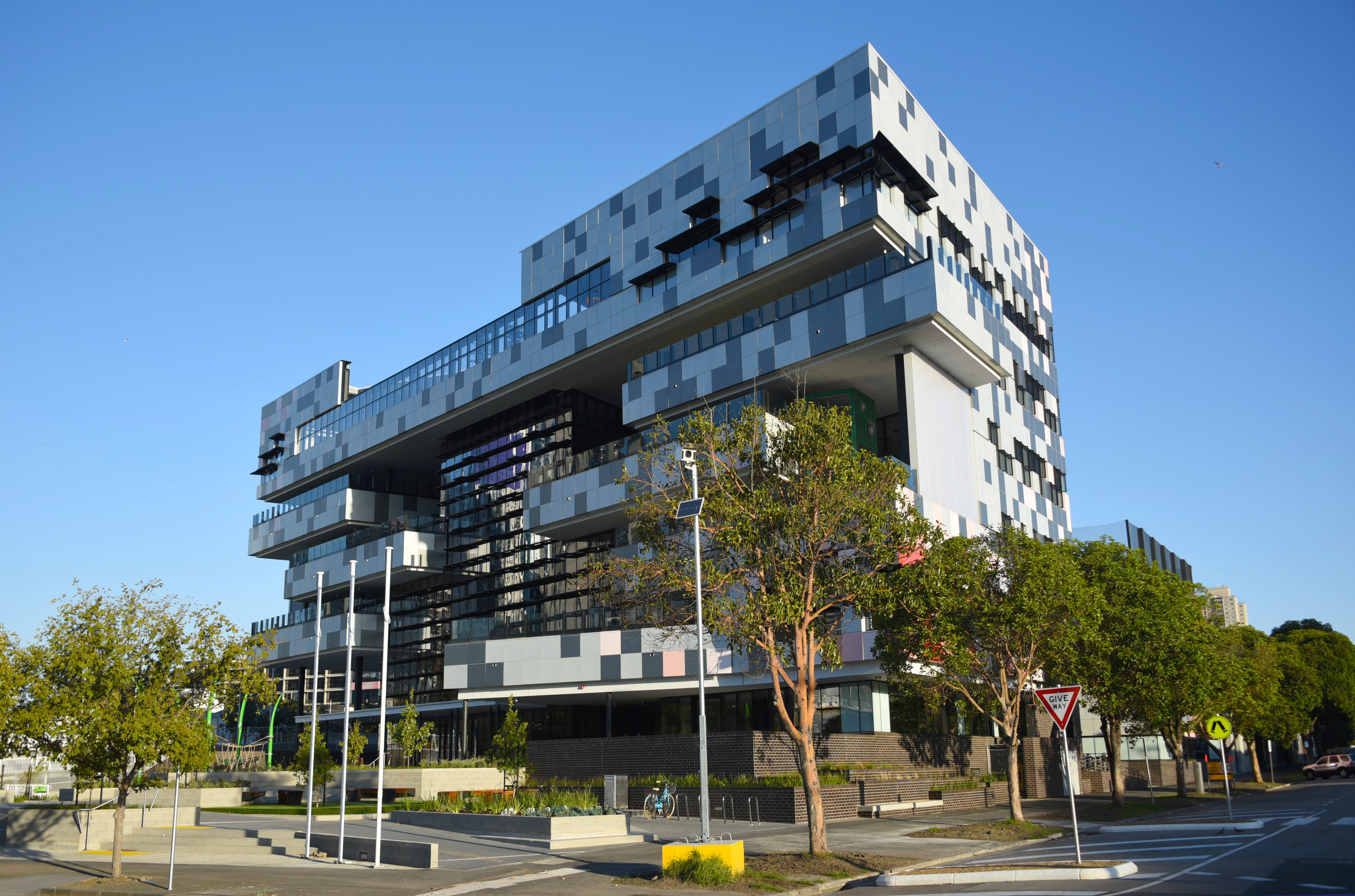
The new South Melbourne Primary School, Victoria's first "vertical" primary school, 2018.

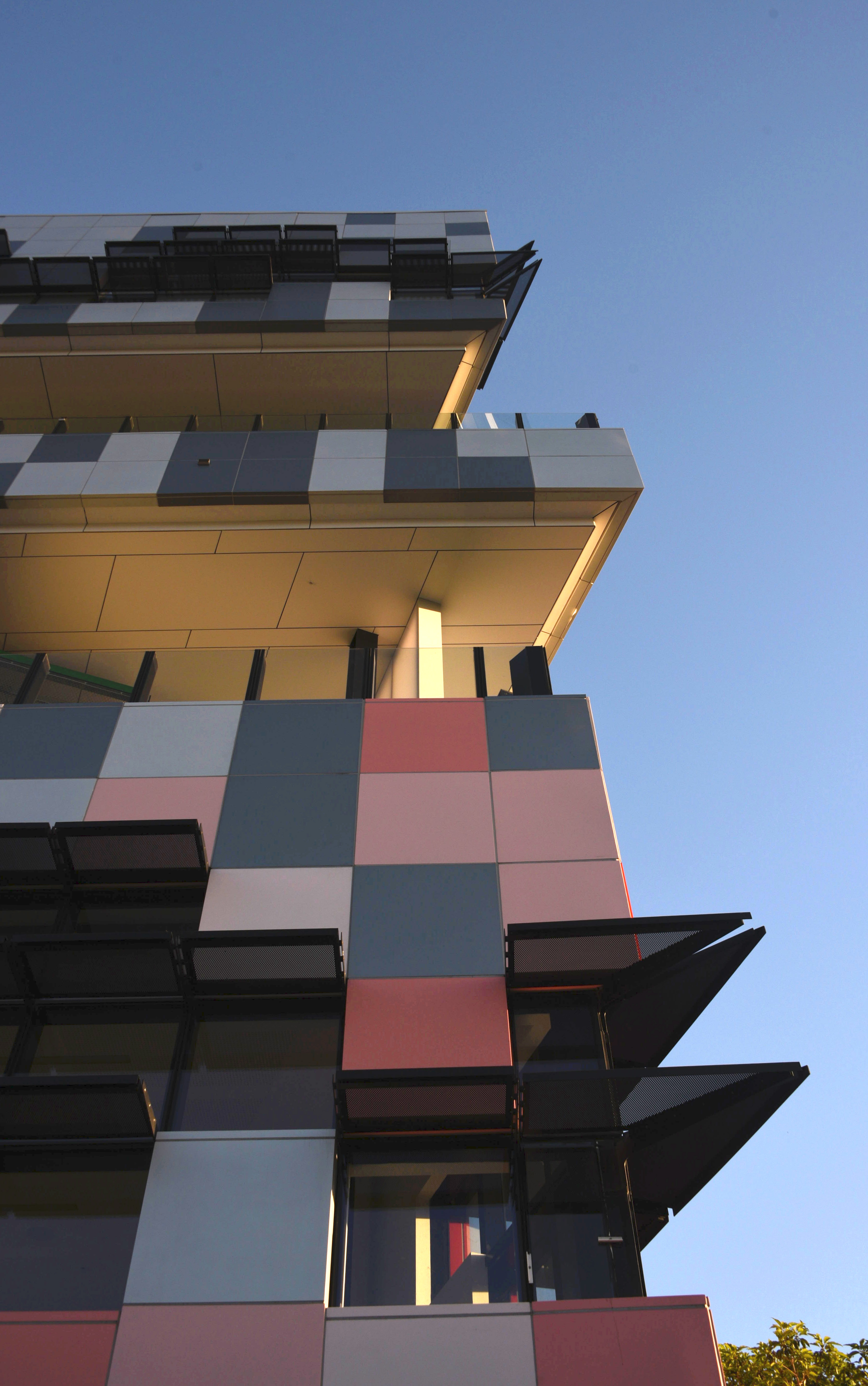
Detail of South Melbourne Primary School, 2018.

The scale of the school infrastructure program led the VSBA in 2017 to seek architects for its new schools, and for new permanent, modular classrooms for existing schools. A number of these classrooms were to replace existing buildings that contained asbestos. The Authority was tasked with replacing 100 of these buildings with prefabricated classrooms.

At certain inner-city locations, space was constrained, and the authority embarked on building "vertical school" campuses, a first for Melbourne. Richmond High School became the state's first vertical high school while South Melbourne Primary School was heralded as the state's first vertical primary school. Designed by Hayball, the 525 student South Melbourne Primary opened in 2018, serving the nearby rapidly growing inner-city areas of Southbank and Fisherman's Bend. The six-story campus sits on a half-acre site on Ferrars Street, adjacent to a new park built on land purchased by the state government and the City of Port Phillip in 2017. The primary school would have no formal classrooms and instead would feature a combination of indoor and outdoor spaces and a central staircase for circulation, with the architect saying it represented a new approach to density for Melbourne. The project was named Future Project of the Year at the 2016 World Architecture Festival in Berlin.

Other inner-city schools like Prahran High School, which opened in 2019, were built as vertical schools. The 650-student school is four storeys tall and is designed by Gray Puksand. COX Architecture and McGregor Coxall designed the three-story campus for Docklands Primary School in the CBD-adjacent Docklands precinct.

== Early Learning Victoria centres ==
In 2022, the Andrews Government announced that the VSBA would build 50 childcare centres across Victoria. Part of a major $9 billion expansion of state provision of childcare, the first four centres opened in 2025 and are co-located with existing primary or secondary schools. 14 centres are planned to open in 2026 with 12 more planned for 2027 and 2028 and the remaining 20 pledged to be built by 2032. These new centres will also be co-located with existing or new primary or secondary schools. Some of the new centres will also include facilities for Maternal and Child Health consultation. These new centres are being operated by a new Victorian government organisation called Early Learning Victoria (ELV).

== List of new VSBA schools and ELV centres ==
=== New schools ===
School	Suburb or town	Years	Status	Opened
Aintree Primary School	Aintree	P–6	Finished	2021
Aitken Hill Primary School	Craigieburn	P–6	Finished	2019
Armstrong Creek School	Armstrong Creek	P–12	Finished	2018
Ashley Park Primary School	Doreen	P–6	Finished	2019
Balambalam Primary School	Clyde North	P–6	Finished	2026
Bannockburn P–12 College	Bannockburn	P–12	Finished	2018
Banum Warrik Primary School	Kalkallo	P–6	Finished	2024
Barayip Primary School	Tarneit	P–6	Finished	2025
Barramayil Primary School	Aintree	P–6	Under construction	2027 (planned)
Barrawang Primary School	Wollert West	P–6	Finished	2023
Barton Primary School	Cranbourne West	P–6	Finished	2017
Bass Coast College – San Remo Campus	San Remo	7–9	Finished	2022
Beaumaris Secondary College	Beaumaris	7–12	Finished	2018
Bemin Secondary College	Truganina	7–12	Finished	2024
Beveridge Primary School – New Campus	Beveridge	P–6	Finished	2020
Binap Primary School	Brookfield	P–6	Finished	2024
Birranga College	Clyde North	7–12	Finished	2026
Biyala Primary School	Armstrong Creek	P–6	Finished	2026
Botanic Ridge Primary School	Botanic Ridge	P–6	Finished	2020
Bridgewood Primary School	Officer	P–6	Finished	2018
Brinbeal Secondary College	Tarneit	7–12	Finished	2024
Burnside Primary School	Burnside	P–6	Finished	2019
Casey Fields Primary School	Cranbourne East	P–6	Finished	2020
Clyde Creek Primary School	Clyde	P–6	Finished	2022
Clyde Secondary College	Clyde	7–12	Finished	2022
Cranbourne West Secondary College	Cranbourne West	7–12	Finished	2021
Davis Creek Primary School	Tarneit	P–6	Finished	2020
Deanside Primary School	Deanside	P–6	Finished	2022
Dharra School	Aintree		Finished	2024
Docklands Primary School	Docklands	P–6	Finished	2021
Dohertys Creek P–9 College	Truganina	P–9	Finished	2019
Donnybrook Primary School	Donnybrook	P–6	Finished	2023
Edenbrook Secondary College	Pakenham	7–12	Finished	2021
Edgars Creek Primary School	Wollert	P–6	Finished	2021
Edgars Creek Secondary College	Wollert	7–12	Finished	2018
Elevation Secondary College	Craigieburn	7–12	Finished	2020
Endeavour Hills Specialist School	Endeavour Hills		Finished	2022
Eynesbury Primary School	Eynesbury	P–6	Finished	2021
Featherbrook P–9 College	Point Cook	P–9	Finished	2017
Footscray High School – New Junior Campus	Footscray	7–9	Finished	2021
Gaayip–Yagila Primary School	Mickleham	P–6	Finished	2021
Gamadji Primary School	Craigieburn	P–6	Finished	2026
Garrang Wilam Primary School	Truganina	P–6	Finished	2021
Gilgai Plains Primary School	Kalkallo	P–6	Finished	2022
Grayling Primary School	Clyde North	P–6	Finished	2020
Greater Shepperton Secondary College	Shepperton	7–12	Finished	2022
Greenvale Secondary College	Greenvale	7–12	Finished	2022
Hamlyn Views School	Hamlyn Heights		Finished	2018
Harvest Home Primary School	Epping	P–6	Finished	2017
Homestead Senior Secondary College	Point Cook	10–12	Finished	2020
John Henry Primary School	Pakenham	P–6	Finished	2017
Kala Primary School	Cranbourne North	P–6	Finished	2026
Karwan Primary School	Tarneit	P–6	Finished	2023
Keelonith Primary School	Greenvale	P–6	Finished	2021
Kerribana Primary School	Leneva	P–6	Finished	2026
Keysborough Gardens Primary School	Keysborough	P–6	Finished	2020
Kolere College	Cobblebank	7–12	Finished	2026
Kulap Primary School	Clyde	P–6	Finished	2026
Kurmile Primary School	Officer	P–6	Finished	2024
Kurrun Primary School	Officer	P–6	Finished	2023
Kuyim Primary School	Pakenham	P–6	Finished	2025
Laa Yulta Primary School	Mambourin	P–6	Finished	2024
Lollypop Creek Primary School	Werribee	P–6	Finished	2023
Lucas Primary School	Lucas	P–6	Finished	2020
Marra School	Kalkallo		Finished	2026
McKinnon Secondary College – East Campus	McKinnon	7–12	Finished	2022
Mernda Central P–12 College	Mernda	P–12	Finished	2017
Mernda Park Primary School	Mernda	P–6	Finished	2017
Mickleham Secondary College	Mickleham	7–12	Finished	2023
Mindalk Primary School	Truganina	P–6	Finished	2026
Mirniyan Primary School	Clyde North	P–6	Finished	2025
Mirripoa Primary School	Duneed	P–6	Finished	2020
Monash Children's Hospital School	Clayton		Finished	2017
Morwell Central Primary School	Morwell	P–6	Finished	2018
Murrum Primary School	Weir Views	P–6	Finished	2026
Muyan Primary School	Wallan	P–6	Finished	2026
Narrarrang Primary School	Port Melbourne	P–6	Finished	2026
Nearnung Primary School	Tarneit	P–6	Finished	2023
Newbury Primary School	Craigieburn	P–6	Finished	2017
Nganboo Borron School	Werribee		Finished	2024
Ngarri Primary School	Manor Lakes	P–6	Finished	2023
Ngayuk College	Kalkallo	7–12	Finished	2026
Ngurraga School	Point Cook		Finished	2026
North Melbourne Primary School – New Campus	North Melbourne	P–6	Finished	2023
Orchard Park Primary School	Officer	P–6	Finished	2021
Oberon High School	Armstrong Creek	7–12	Finished	2021
Pakenham Primary School	Pakenham	P–6	Finished	2019
Port Melbourne Secondary College	Port Melbourne	7–12	Finished	2022
Prahran High School	Windsor	7–12	Finished	2019
Preston High School	Preston	7–12	Finished	2019
Quarters Primary School	Cranbourne West	P–6	Finished	2023
Ramlegh Park Primary School	Clyde North	P–6	Finished	2021
Richmond High School	Richmond	7–12	Finished	2018
Riverbend Primary School	Wyndham Vale	P–6	Finished	2021
Riverwalk Primary School	Werribee	P–6	Finished	2020
Rockbank Toolern Road Primary School (interim name)	Rockbank	P–6	Planning	2028 (planned)
Saltwater P–9 College	Point Cook	P–9	Finished	2019
South Melbourne Park Primary School	South Albert Park	P–6	Finished	2019
South Melbourne Primary School	Southbank	P–6	Finished	2018
Springside West Secondary College	Fraser Rise	7–12	Finished	2018
Strathtulloh Primary School	Strathtulloh	P–6	Finished	2022
Tarneit Rise Primary School	Tarneit	P–6	Finished	2018
Tarneit Senior College	Tarneit	10–12	Finished	2018
Thompsons East Primary School (interim name)	Clyde North	P–6	Planning	2028 (planned)
Thornhill Park Primary School	Thornhill Park	P–6	Finished	2023
Topirum Primary School	Clyde North	P–6	Finished	2024
Torquay Coast Primary School	Torquay	P–6	Finished	2018
Tulliallan Primary School	Cranbourne North	P–6	Finished	2017
Turrun Primary School	Clyde North	P–6	Finished	2025
Umarkoo Primary School	Wollert	P–6	Finished	2026
Walcom Ngarrwa Secondary College	Werribee	7–12	Finished	2024
Wangaratta District Specialist School – New Benalla Campus	Clyde North		Finished	2024
Warreen Primary School	Truganina	P–6	Finished	2024
Wayart School	Officer		Under construction	2027 (planned)
Wayi School	Craigieburn		Finished	2023
Wilandra Rise Primary School	Clyde North	P–6	Finished	2017
Willowbank Primary School	Gisborne	P–6	Finished	2022
Wimba Primary School	Tarneit	P–6	Finished	2024
Wirrigirri Primary School	Wollert	P–6	Finished	2025
Wiyal Primary School	Fraser Rise	P–6	Finished	2026
Wollahra Secondary School (interim name)	Wyndham Vale	7–12	Planning	2028 (planned)
Wollert Primary School	Wollert	P–6	Finished	2022
Wollert Secondary College	Wollert East	7–12	Finished	2023
Wulerrp Secondary College	Clyde North	7–12	Finished	2025
Yarrabing Secondary School	Aintree	7–12	Finished	2024
Yirrama Primary School	Charlemont	P–6	Finished	2026
Yubup Primary School	Mickleham	P–6	Finished	2024
Yurran P–9 College	Point Cook	P–9	Finished	2026

=== ELV centres ===
Centre	Suburb or town	Co-located school	Status	Opened
ELV Alexandra (interim name)	Alexandra	Alexandra Primary School	Planning	2029 (planned)
ELV Avoca (interim name)	Avoca	Avoca Primary School	Under construction	2027 (planned)
ELV Bani Walup	Murtoa	Murtoa College	Finished	2025
ELV Barribina	Teesdale	Teesdale Primary School	Finished	2026
ELV Bimbit	Werribee	Wyndham Park Primary School	Finished	2026
ELV Churchill (interim name)	Churchill		Planning	2028 (planned)
ELV Cohuna (interim name)	Cohuna	Cohuna Consolidated School	Under construction	2027 (planned)
ELV Drouin (interim name)	Drouin		Planning	2029 (planned)
ELV Dupitjin	Wedderburn	Wedderburn College	Finished	2026
ELV Gamadji	Craigieburn	Gamadji Primary School	Finished	2025
ELV Garrong	Kings Park	Kings Park Primary School	Finished	2026
ELV Hamilton (interim name)	Hamilton		Planning	2029 (planned)
ELV Lockington (interim name)	Lockington	Lockington Consolidated School	Planning	2028 (planned)
ELV Laak	Hallam	Hallam Primary School	Finished	2025
ELV Maffra (interim name)	Maffra	Maffra Primary School	Planning	2028 (planned)
ELV Maryborough (interim name)	Maryborough	Marybourough Education Centre	Planning	2028 (planned)
ELV Meeniyan (interim name)	Meeniyan	Meeniyan Primary School	Under construction	2027 (planned)
ELV Murrum	Weir Views	Murrum Primary School	Finished	2025
ELV Muyan	Sunshine	Sunshine Primary School	Finished	2025
ELV Newborough East (interim name)	Newborough	Newborough East Primary School	Under construction	2027 (planned)
ELV Nicholson and District (interim name)	Nicholson	Nicholson Primary School	Under construction	2027 (planned)
ELV Ngalambi	Noble Park	Harrisfield Primary School	Finished	2025
ELV Ngawak	Frankston	McClelland Secondary College and Ballam Park Primary School	Finished	2025
ELV Numurkah	Numurkah	Numurkah Primary School	Finished	2026
ELV Nyernilang Lar	Sailors Gully	Eaglehawk North Primary School	Finished	2025
ELV Rockbank (interim name)	Rockbank	Rockbank Toolern Road Primary School (interim name)	Planning	2028 (planned)
ELV Red Cliffs (interim name)	Mildura		Under construction	2027 (planned)
ELV Seymour (interim name)	Seymour	Seymour College (Agricultural Campus)	Planning	2029 (planned)
ELV Shepparton	Shepparton	Wilmot Road Primary School	Finished	2026
ELV St Leonards (interim name)	St Leonards	St Leonards Primary School	Planning	2028 (planned)
ELV Thookay Yarkeen	Portland	Portland South Primary School	Finished	2026
ELV Umarkoo	Wollert	Umarkoo Primary School	Finished	2025
ELV Warrnambool (interim name)	Warrnambool	Deakin University, Warrnambool Campus	Planning	2028 (planned)
ELV Wimbi	Fawkner	Moomba Park Primary School	Finished	2025
ELV Wirmal	Clunes	Clunes Primary School	Finished	2026
