= Clare Cousins =

Australian architect

- Born: Melbourne, Australia
- Education: RMIT University, Technische Universität Berlin
- Occupation: Architect
- Notable work: Nightingale Village, Stable & Cart House, Camberwell House, Long House, Baffle House, St Kilda East House
- Spouse: Ben Pedersen
- Children: 2
- Website: https://clarecousins.com.au

Clare Cousins is an Australian architect, interior designer, and director of Melbourne-based Clare Cousins Architects, established in 2005. Cousins served as the national president of the Australian Institute of Architects (AIA). She was awarded the Chapter Presidential Medal by the Institute for her advocacy to protect Anzac Hall. She has also received the Presidential Medal of the American Institute of Architects.

== Early life and family ==
Born in Melbourne, at age 8 Cousins moved to London, and then later to Berlin as her father who practised as a surgeon pursued further medical education.

Cousins lives with her husband Ben Pedersen and her two children. The couple purchased their brick Edwardian home in 2007, and three years later did a major renovation designed by Cousins, and built by Pedersen and his company Maben.

== Education ==
Cousins completed secondary school at St Michael's Grammar School in St Kilda, finishing in 1993. She went on to attend RMIT University (Royal Melbourne Institute of Technology) from 1994 to 2001 receiving her Bachelor of Architecture. Her first year coincided with Sand Helsel's first year as Head of Architecture at RMIT. Cousins has stated "It was an exciting time to have a female head of architecture." During her degree Cousins went back to Berlin to do an exchange with Technische Universität Berlin.

During her degree at RMIT, Cousins began working in the construction arm of Van Haandel Group. While working on the Aurora Spa Retreat on the roof of St Kilda's iconic Prince of Wales Hotel she met Wood Marsh. After more than two years on the job, and the completion of her schooling Cousins petitioned Marsh for a six-month role at Wood Marsh Architecture. The six-month role became a three year stint.

== Architecture career ==
Cousins opened her studio Clare Cousins Architects in 2005, sharing an office with her husband's construction company Maben at 140 Langford street in North Melbourne. The couple then purchased and moved into a semi-brutalist space that they refurbished and named 'The Blackwood Street Bunker' in 2013.

During Cousins' tenure as National President of AIA she fought to increase the role of architects in national policy debates, fighting for issues of sustainability, affordable housing and urban density. Cousins has also served as the Victorian chapter councillor, an active member of the Victorian Small and Medium Practice Forums, chair of the Member Services Committee (Victoria), chair of the Architecture Australia Editorial Committee, Constructive Mentoring Program mentor (Victoria) a juror at both state and national levels of the Australian Institute of Architects' National Architecture Awards program.

=== Nightingale involvement ===
In 2014, Cousins and Pederson invested $100,000 in Nightingale 1.0, a not-for-profit replicable, triple bottom line housing model with an overarching priority towards social, economic, and environmental sustainability.

Completed in 2022, Cousins lead the design of Nightingale Evergreen. Located along five other Nightingale projects within Nightingale Village, Nightingale Evergreen contains 27 apartments designed for diverse individuals and families. Through a collaboration with Housing Choices Australia and Women's Property Initiatives, Nightingale Evergreen has pre-allocated 20% of their apartments to community housing providers.

== Awards and honours ==
- 2007 Australian Interior Design Awards – Winner – Best State Award Commercial Retail Interior (ACT) (Aesop, Canberra)
- 2007 Australian Interior Design Awards – Commendation – Award for Retail Interior (Aesop, Canberra)
- 2009 Australian Interior Design Awards – Commendation – Award for Colour in Residential Interiors (Page Street Residence)
- 2010 Dulux Colour Awards – Winner – Residential Exterior (342 Apartments)
- 2010 Australian Interior Design Awards – Commendation – Award for Colour in Residential Interiors (Mocha, Chadstone)
- 2012 Australian Interior Design Awards – Commendation – Residential Design (Brick House)
- In 2013 Cousins was awarded the Emerging Architect Prize at the Institute's Australian Achievement in Architecture Awards.
- 2013 Australian Interior Design Awards – Commendation – Workplace Design (Moor Street Studio)
- 2013 Emerging Architect Prize, National – Winner
- 2013 Emerging Architect Prize, VIC Chapter – Winner
- 2013 Museums & Galleries National Awards (MAGNA) – Winner – Exhibitions (temporary) level 4 (ACMI Game Masters Exhibitions)
- 2014 Victorian Architecture Awards – Winner – Residential Architecture (St Kilda East House)
- 2014 Victorian Architecture Awards – Commendation – Small Project Architecture (Flinders Lane Apartments)
- 2014 Houses Awards – Commendation – House Alterations and Additions under 200m^{2} (St Kilda East House)
- 2014 Houses Awards – Commendation – House in a Heritage Context (St Kilda East House)
- 2014 Australian Interior Design Awards – Commendation – Residential Design (Flinders Lane House)
- 2014 Think Brick Awards – Finalist – Bruce Mackenzie Landscape Awards (St Kilda East House)
- 2014 Think Brick Awards – Finalist – Roof Tile Excellence Award (The Shingle House)
- 2014 Melbourne Design Awards – Silver Winner – Architecture Residential Constructed (Flinders Lane Apartment)
- 2015 Australian Interior Design Awards – Commendation – Public Design (The Channel)
- 2016 Houses Awards – Winner – House Alterations and Additions under 200m^{2} (Baffle House)
- 2016 Houses Awards – Commendation – Outdoor (Baffle House)
- 2017 Think Brick Awards – Finalist – Horbury Hunt Residential Award (Elsternwick House)
- 2017 Think Brick Awards – Finalist – Kevin Borland Masonry Award (Rail House)
- In 2018 was awarded the American Institute of Architect's Presidential Medal in New York City.
- Cousins was inaugurated as the national president of the Australian Institute of Architects at the institute's annual general meeting in Melbourne in 2018. Focusing on affordability and sustainability during her term Cousins says, "I am passionate about the transformational role architects play in the life of our cities and communities as champions of innovation, quality and design that enhances sustainability and liveability."
- 2018 American Institute of Architects – Presidential Medal
- 2018 Think Brick Awards – High Commendation – Bruce Mackenzie Landscape Award (Garden Room House)
- 2018 Think Brick Awards – High Commendation – Robin Dods Roof Tile Excellence Award (Lewisham Rd House)
- 2019 Melbourne Design Awards – Gold – Architecture Residential Constructed (Garden Room House)
- 2019 Melbourne Design Awards – Silver – Architecture Residential Constructed (Long House)
- 2019 Melbourne Design Awards – Silver – Interior Design Public or Institutional (Arts Centre Melbourne)
- 2019 Melbourne Design Awards – Gold – Environmental Design (Long House)
- 2020 Victoria Architecture Awards – Architecture Award – Commercial Architecture (Light Box)
- 2020 Houses Awards – Commendation – Sustainability (Long House)
- In 2021 Cousins was awarded the President's Medal, the highest honour bestowed by the ACT chapter of AIA. Cousins was recognized for her contribution to the advancement of the profession as a whole, as well as serving as a spokesperson for the #HandsOffAnzacHall campaign, a campaign to stop the demolition of the award-winning Anzac Hall.
- 2021 Australian Institute of Architects ACT – Chapter President's Medal
- 2021 Think Brick Awards – Winner – Robin Dods Roof Tile Excellence Award (Camberwell House)
- 2021 Think Brick Awards – High Commendation – Hornbury Hunt Residential Award (Camberwell House)
- 2021 Think Brick Awards – High Commendation – Hornbury Hunt Residential Award (Waterfall House)
- 2021 Melbourne Design Week Award – Winner (A New Normal)
- 2022 National Architecture Awards – Award for Residential Architecture – Houses Alterations & Additions (Stable & Cart House)
- 2022 Victorian Architecture Awards – Award for Residential Architecture – Houses Alterations & Additions (Stable & Cart House)
- 2022 Victorian Architecture Awards – Commendation for Heritage – Creative Adaptation (Stable & Cart House)
- 2022 Victorian Architecture Awards – Commendation for Residential Architecture – Houses New (Esplanade House)
- 2022 Australian Interior Design Awards – Winner – Premier Award for Australian Interior Design (Stable & Cart House)
- 2022 Australian Interior Design Awards – Winner – Best of State Residential Design (Stable & Cart House)
- 2022 Australian Interior Design Awards – Winner – Residential Design (Stable & Cart House)
- 2023 Victorian Architecture Awards – Dimity Reed Melbourne Prize (Nightingale Village)
- 2023 Victorian Architecture Awards – Allan and Beth Coldicutt Award for Sustainable Architecture (Nightingale Village)
- 2023 Victorian Architecture Awards – Award for Residential Architecture – Multiple Housing (Nightingale Village)
- 2023 Victorian Architecture Awards – Award for Urban Design (Nightingale Village)
- 2023 Melbourne Design Awards – Gold – Better Future Environmental Sustainability (Nightingale Village)
- 2023 Melbourne Design Awards – Silver – Architecture Multi Residential Constructed (Nightingale Village)
- 2023 Australian Interior Design Awards – Commendation – Retail Design (Aesop Collins St)
