= Melbourne Prize =

Annual architecture award for civic contribution to the life of Melbourne, Australia

Dimity Reed Melbourne Prize
- Awarded for: Architectural contribution to the public life of Melbourne
- Country: Australia
- Presented by: Australian Institute of Architects (Victoria Chapter)
- First award: 1997; 29 years ago
- Currently held by: JCB Architects, Site Office and AW Maritime for St Kilda Pier Redevelopment, 2026
- Website: www.architecture.com.au/archives/chapter_awards/the-dimity-reed-melbourne-prize-vic

The Dimity Reed Melbourne Prize is an Australian architectural award. It is awarded annually at the Victorian Architecture Awards by a jury appointed by the Victoria Chapter of the Australian Institute of Architects to architectural projects that have made a significant contribution to the public life of Melbourne, Australia. It was first awarded in 1997 to Six Degrees Architects for the small bar Meyers Place.

== Background ==
=== Eligibility ===
The winner is drawn from direct-entry categories in the annual Victorian Architecture Awards program, and any project located within the urban growth boundary of the Melbourne metropolitan area is eligible for consideration for the prize which can be drawn from any category in the awards. The prize has been given to 33 individual projects in the 29 years since it was established (to 2026).

=== Named Award ===
In 2023 the Melbourne Prize became a named award, to be known as the Dimity Reed Melbourne Prize. The naming of the award was made in recognition of Reed's urban and architectural contributions to the city and the architectural profession as a practitioner, academic and media commentator.

== 1997 inaugural prize – Meyers Place ==
Meyers Place (small bar)

General information
- Architectural style: Contemporary urban recycled
- Location: Melbourne CBD, 20 Meyers Place, City of Melbourne, Victoria, Australia
- Coordinates: 37°48′44.66″S 144°58′20.55″E
- Construction started: 1994
- Opened: 1994
- Relocated: 2017
- Closed: 2021 (at 24 Crossley St)
- Cost: A$30,000 (1994)
- Client: Six Degrees Architects
- Owner: Six Degrees Architects

Dimensions
- Other dimensions: 5 metres (16 ft) across x 10 metres (33 ft) deep

Technical details
- Floor count: 1
- Floor area: 50 m^{2} (540 sq ft)

Design and construction
- Architect: Six Degrees Architects
- Awards: 1997 Melbourne Prize

=== Background ===
Since its inception, the prize has recognised projects across a broad range of scales and typologies that have made significant contributions to the civic and cultural identity of Melbourne’s CBD. The first winner in 1997 was a small, low budget, eponymous laneway bar known simply as Meyers Place. The bar was located in Meyers Place — a narrow north–south lane running off Bourke Street — in the east end of the city, in the same small building where the late night Waiters Club Restaurant was located upstairs. The bar was intended to be unnamed but its laneway name became its informal moniker. Meyers Place was designed, built, owned and operated by Six Degrees Architects, with a start up cost of approximately $30,000 in 1994 (equivalent to around $60,000 in 2022).

=== Melbourne's first laneway bar ===
The Meyers Place project was created by the young Six Degrees architecture office as a means of displaying their innovative skills not only as designers and builders, but also as urbanists, where architecture and design could stimulate city life and create new communities and activities in the city after hours.

"We wanted it to be difficult to find, with no sign, down a back lane."

— Six Degrees Architects

The bar was the first to use the new General Licence Class B and was at the forefront of the developing word–of–mouth small laneway bar scene that spread through the back streets and lanes of Melbourne in the mid to late 1990s. These bars became a significant part of the cultural landscape of the city, providing interesting fit outs in out–of–the–way locations. The bar scene that followed provided not only a place to meet but also helped activate the evening economy of the city, a great change from the rustbelt recession years of the early 1990s when the city was empty at night. A review described the venue as such "..the bar's roller door, shagpile-carpeted walls and recycled timber interior was the mainspring of a recycled aesthetic which became a Melbourne signature. Cramped and casual, regulars would comment that it felt more like a party than a venue, especially at 2am after a few Melbourne Bitter longnecks."

"Melbourne’s strength is the small bars and restaurants that don’t announce themselves. It’s the opposite of branding. Melbourne’s subtle, a city of discovery. Very early on we were saying ‘let’s not be obvious, let’s encourage Melbourne solutions’. One of the first little laneway bars was in Meyers Place, by Six Degrees Architects. They were the first recipients of the Melbourne Prize for projects that enhanced the real character of Melbourne because that’s exactly what they did. Discovering bars and cafes has become part of Melbourne’s experience, the harder to find, the more the desire.”

— Rob Adams, City Architect, City of Melbourne (Juror of the inaugural Melbourne Prize)

=== Closure and relocation ===
The bar closed on 10 June 2017 after the long held lease was not renewed. The bar interior was relocated by Drew Pettifer and Heather Lakin piece–by–piece — a city block north to 24 Crossley Street — with most of the fitout making the move to new premises. Meyers Place 2.0 closed in March 2021, a year after the first Covid–19 pandemic lockdowns severely impacted Melbourne's hospitality scene. In 2024 the bar was reopened under the name of Bard's Apothecary by Carmel and Matthew Molony. “We feel like we’re holding on to a little bit of Melbourne history...You don’t get much more Melbourne laneway than this bar. The legacy lives on, and we celebrate that." noted Carmel.

=== 1997 commendations ===
Three commendations were also given in the first year of the Melbourne Prize to; Drewery Lane apartments by Warren J. Foster; Emery apartment, Melbourne Terrace Apartments, by Nonda Katsalidis; and the Promenade at Southbank by The Buchan Group with Denton Corker Marshall.

== 1998 and 1999 awards ==
The 1998 prize was awarded to a very differently scaled project and budget for the $25m redevelopment of the former high end classical 1880s Georges Department Store at 162–168 Collins Street, Melbourne. The refurbishment was designed by architect Daryl Jackson with Conran Design Partnership from the United Kingdom. The building was restored and adaptively modified to include a range of retail concessions, restaurants, and a Conran Design Store. A commendation was given to Peter Elliott with Curnow Freiverts Glover for State Government Offices at Treasury Place.

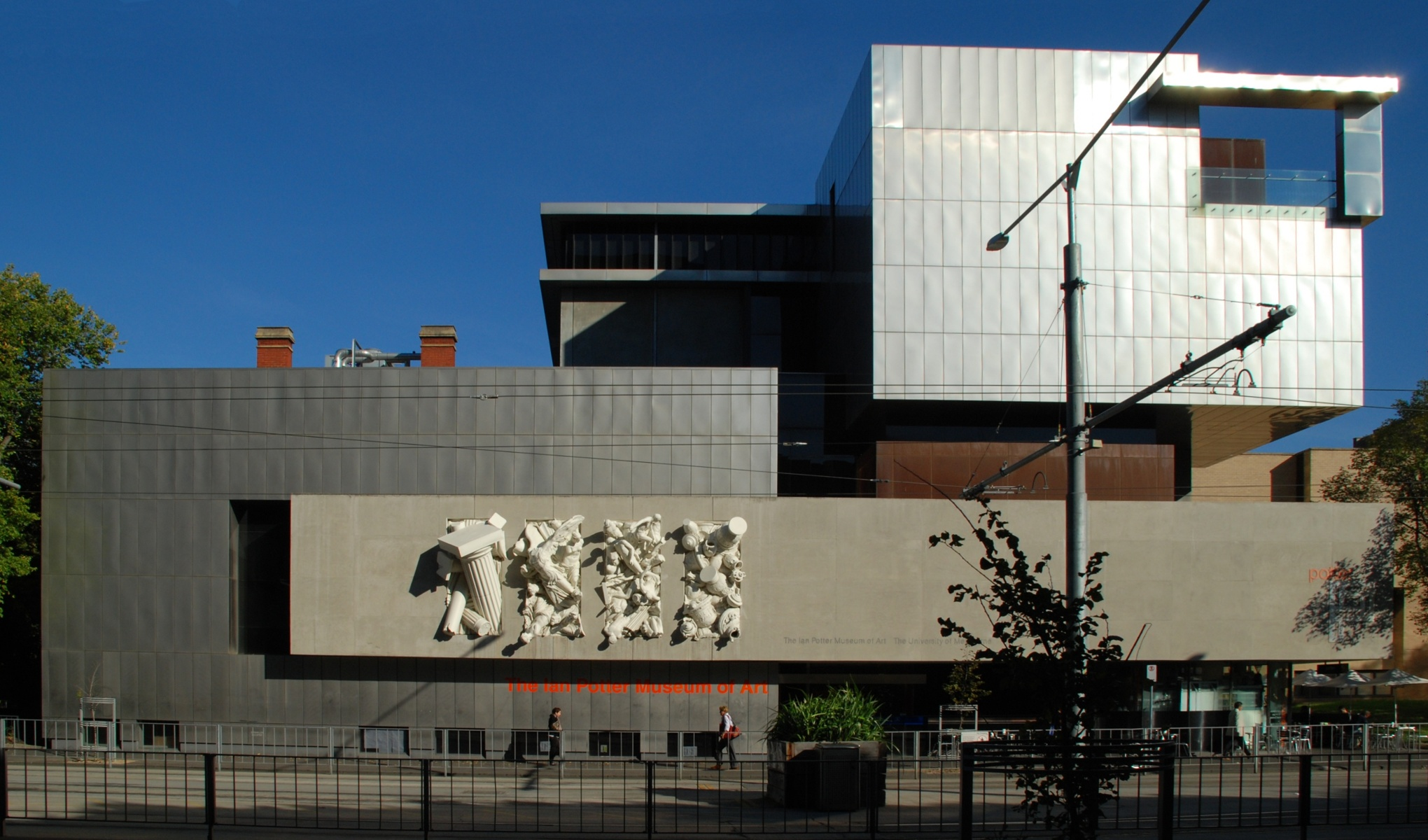
Street elevation of Ian Potter Museum of Art, 1999 winner

The 1999 prize was awarded to Nation Fender Katsalidis for the Ian Potter Museum of Art located on Swanston Street, Parkville, within the University of Melbourne campus. The museum is strongly defined by its street facade that features an array of classical sculptures. The museum also took out the highest award, the Victorian Architecture Medal, for project of the year, and the William Wardell Award for Public Architecture, the first occasion that one project took out all three awards. A commendation was presented to Allom Lovell and Associates with Daryl Jackson for the Immigration Museum project on Flinders Street.

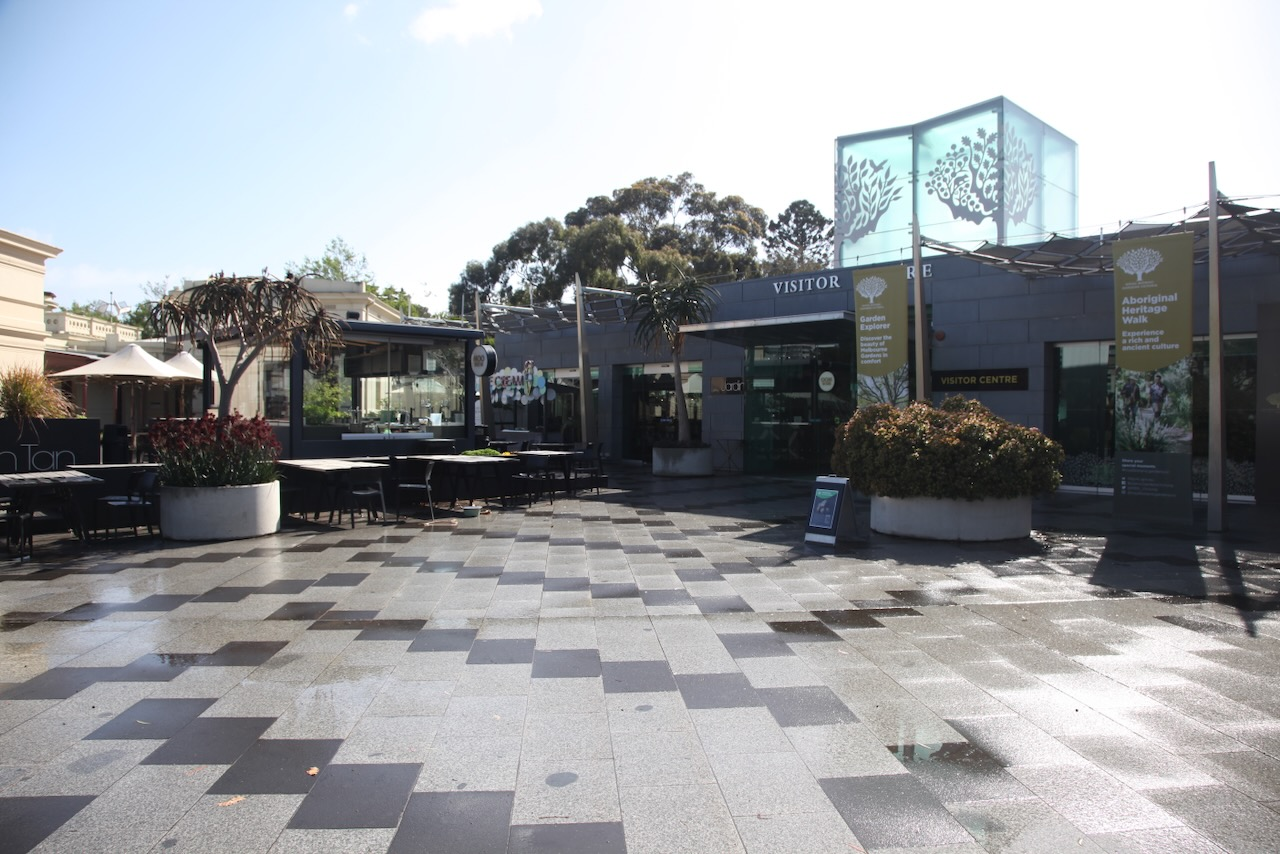
Observatory Gate Precinct by Peter Elliott, 2000 winner

== 2000 to 2009 awards ==
The 2000 prize was won by Peter Elliott for the Observatory Gate Precinct at Royal Botanic Gardens, Melbourne. The project created a new entrance, outdoor plaza, amenities and visitor centre for the Botanic Garden incorporating the former Melbourne Observatory and Charles La Trobe's 'triangle sites' in the gardens and parklands. Gregory Burgess Architects was awarded a commendation for the Catholic Theological College in East Melbourne. This was the last year commendations were given, with only single or joint winners awarded from 2001.

The 2001 prize was won for the EQ Project at Hamer Hall by NMBW Architecture Studio, since demolished for the 2010 upgrade by Ashton Raggatt McDougall (ARM Architecture).

The Sidney Myer Music Bowl upgrade in the Kings Domain by Gregory Burgess Architects was awarded the prize in 2002.

The architecture competition winning scheme for Federation Square by Lab Architecture Studio in collaboration with Bates Smart won the award along with four other awards in 2003.

In 2004 the prize was awarded to Ashton Raggatt McDougall for the Shrine of Remembrance Visitor Centre and Garden Courtyard.

The 2005 prize was awarded to NH Architecture for the QV mixed use 'urban village' and retail redevelopment between Swanston and Russell Streets in the Melbourne CBD. The QV project created a series of new laneways and connections through the whole city block on which the project is sited "...the design was informed by the model of Melbourne’s laneways as the generator of the urban form".

ARM Architecture again received the prize in 2006 for the Melbourne Central Shopping Centre redevelopment on Swanston Street and La Trobe Street. For the first time a joint winner was declared with The Urban Workshop (a commercial office project at 50 Lonsdale Street) also awarded the 2006 Melbourne Prize, designed by John Wardle Architects, Hassell and NH Architecture in joint venture.

The 2007 Prize was awarded to the Sandridge Bridge Precinct Redevelopment over the Yarra River by City of Melbourne in association with Nadim Karam and Marcus O’Reilly.

Six Degrees Architects also collected the award for a second time in 2008 with their redevelopment of The Vaults on the Yarra River beneath Federation Square for use as their own architecture offices and the adjacent licensed 'Riverland' bar. The site is now known as Federation Wharf. The 2008 Jury was Peter Crone (chair), Alfred deBruyne and Mel Dodd.

The Canada Hotel Redevelopment for student housing on Swanston Street and Pelham Street, Carlton designed by Hayball won the prize in 2009.

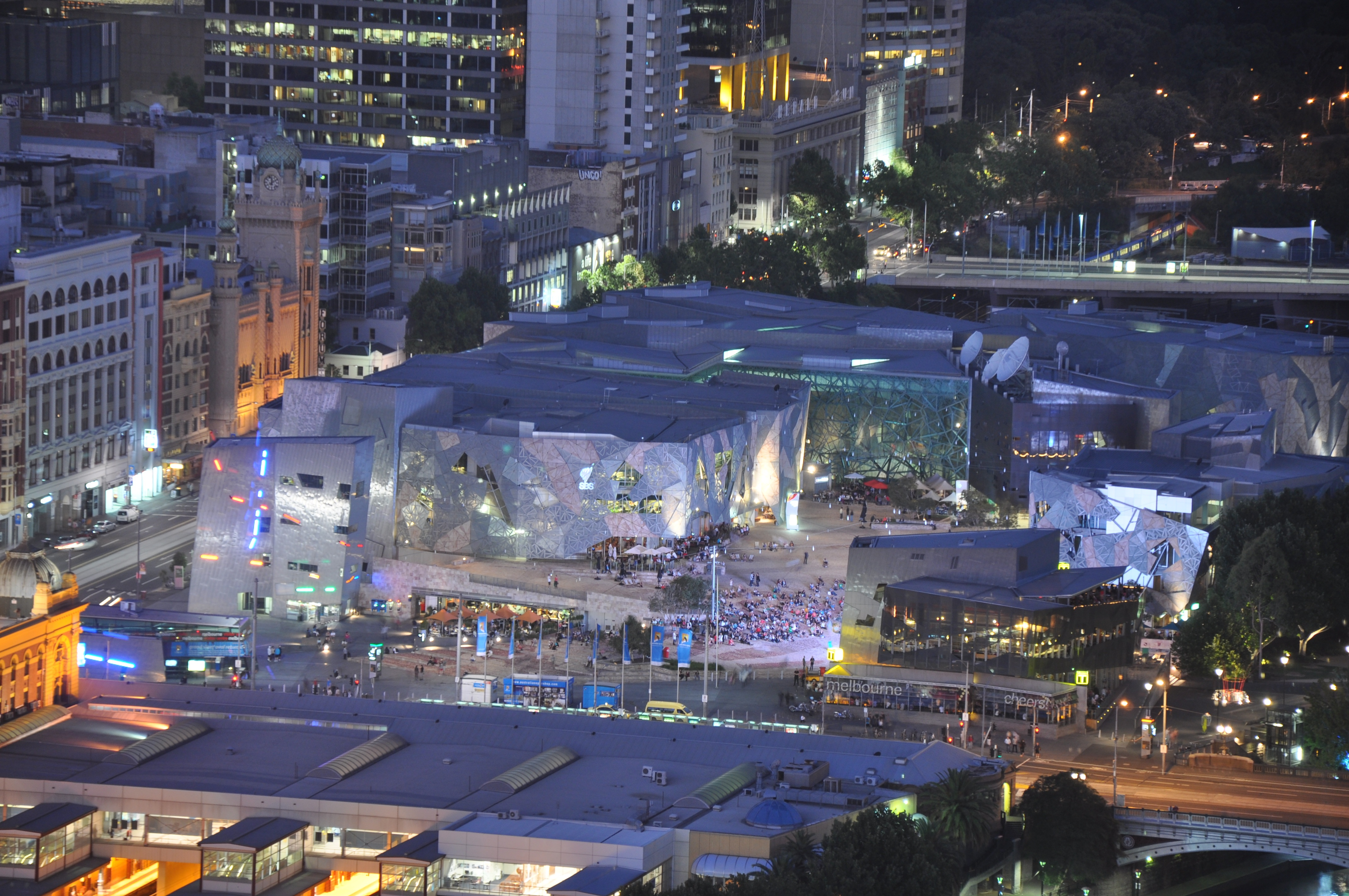
Federation Square, 2003 winner

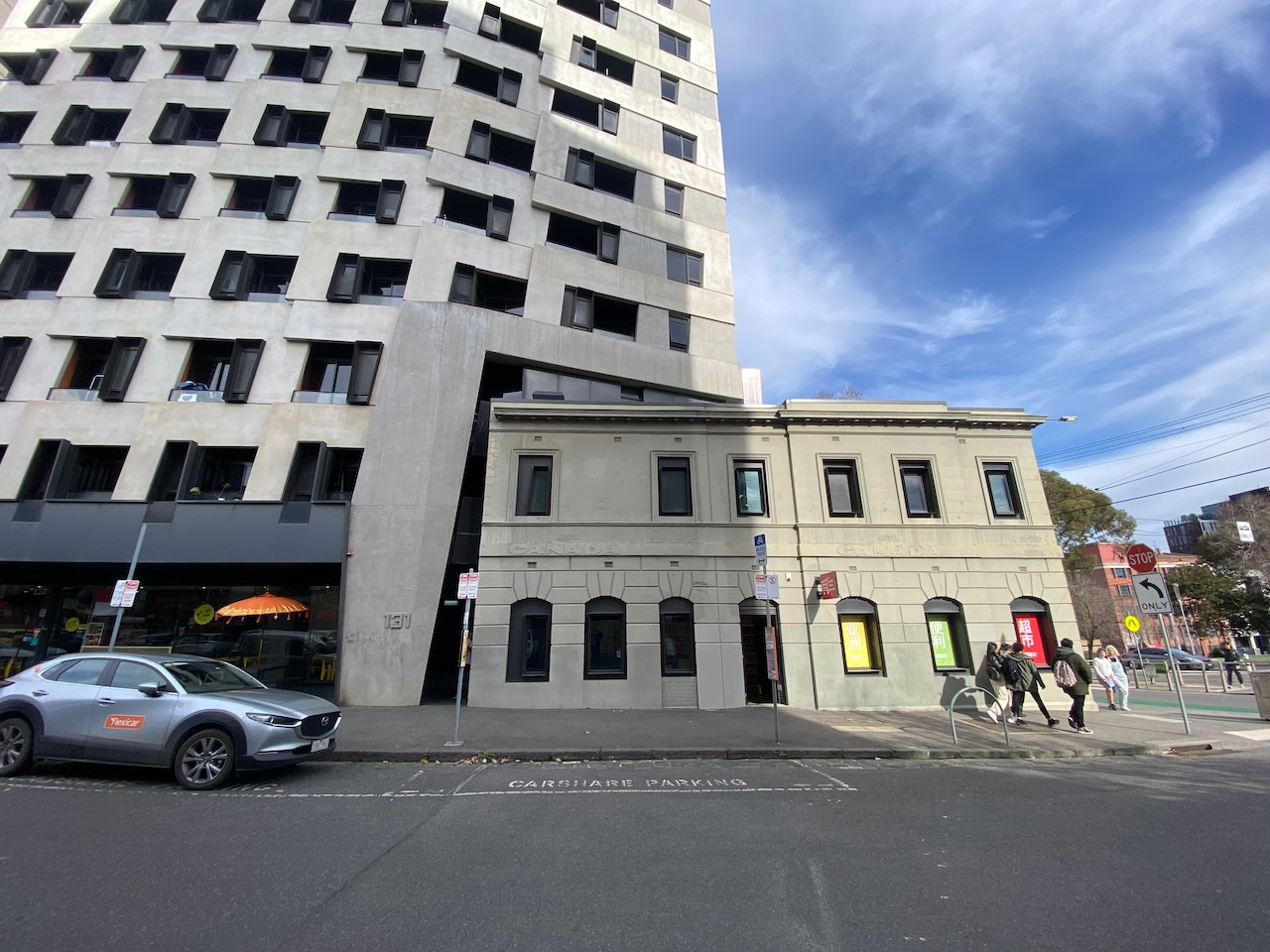
Canada Hotel Redevelopment, Carlton, 2009 winner

== 2010 to 2019 awards ==
=== 2010 Prize ===
The Melbourne Convention and Exhibition Centre by joint venture architects, Woods Bagot and NH Architecture was awarded the 2010 Melbourne Prize in addition to the Victorian Architecture Medal, William Wardell Award for Public Architecture, Steel Architecture Award and the Award for Sustainable Architecture.

=== 2011 Prize ===
The 2011 prize was won by Cox Architecture for Melbourne Rectangular Stadium, Melbourne's major rectangular football stadium.

=== 2012 Prize ===
In 2012 the Royal Children’s Hospital by Billard Leece Partnership and Bates Smart was awarded the prize. Maggie Edmond was the chair of the jury in 2012.

=== 2013 Prize ===
In 2013 the prize was awarded to BKK Architects/TCL Partnership for the Lonsdale Street Boulevard project, part of 'Revitalising Central Dandenong' in south east Melbourne, around 30 kilometres from the CBD. This was the first time the Melbourne Prize was awarded to a project in suburban Melbourne. The jury was Tim Shannon (Chair); Ann Lau from Hayball and Alan Pert from the Melbourne School of Design.

=== 2014 Prize ===
In addition to the William Wardell Award for Public Architecture, the Dallas Brooks Community Primary School located 17 kilometres north of Melbourne CBD in the suburb of Dallas designed by McBride Charles Ryan took out the 2014 Melbourne Prize. For the second year in a row an outer suburban project won the prize.

=== 2015 Prize ===
The 2015 jury was chaired by Graham Brawn (Graham Brawn Architect) and included Harley Vincent (HASSELL) and Fiona Dunin (fmd architects). The 2015 Melbourne Prize shortlist included; Bridging Boyd by Jolson Architecture Interiors Landscape, Domain Road Apartments by Wood Marsh Architecture, Lab 14 Carlton Connect Initiative by NMBW Architecture Studio, Monash University North West Precinct by Jackson Clements Burrows Architects, MPavilion by Sean Godsell Architects, New Municipal Building and Civic Square by Lyons and Shrine of Remembrance, Galleries of Remembrance by ARM Architecture.

ARM Architecture won a third Melbourne Prize and a second for the same project for additional work at the Shrine of Remembrance, Galleries of Remembrance and southern courtyards with landscape architects Rush\Wright in 2015. Amy Muir, Chair of Juries described it as robust and sympathetic in its approach to detailing and built execution, the Stage Two addition provides an exemplar, quality architectural intervention which also received unanimous support as the winner of the 2015 Victorian Architecture Medal and late in the same year presented with the national 2015 Sir Zelman Cowen Award for Public Architecture.

=== 2016 Prize ===
In 2016 the prize was awarded to the Saltwater Community Centre in Point Cook by Croxon Ramsay Architects for Wyndham City Council. The community centre lies around 30 kilometres to the south west of the Melbourne CBD. The project also won a Sustainable Architecture Award. The 2016 jury was Tim Jackson (chair, Jackson Clements Burrows Architects), Peter Williams (Williams Boag) and Anna Maskiell (Public Realm Lab).

=== 2017 Prize ===
In 2017 the prize was jointly awarded to two projects; the 2016 NGV Architecture Commission: Haven’t you always wanted…? by M@ STUDIO Architects and the Tanderrum Bridge by John Wardle Architects and NADAAA in collaboration. The jury was composed of James Staughton (Workshop Architecture), Alison Nunn (Alison Nunn Architect), Amy Muir (Muir Architects).

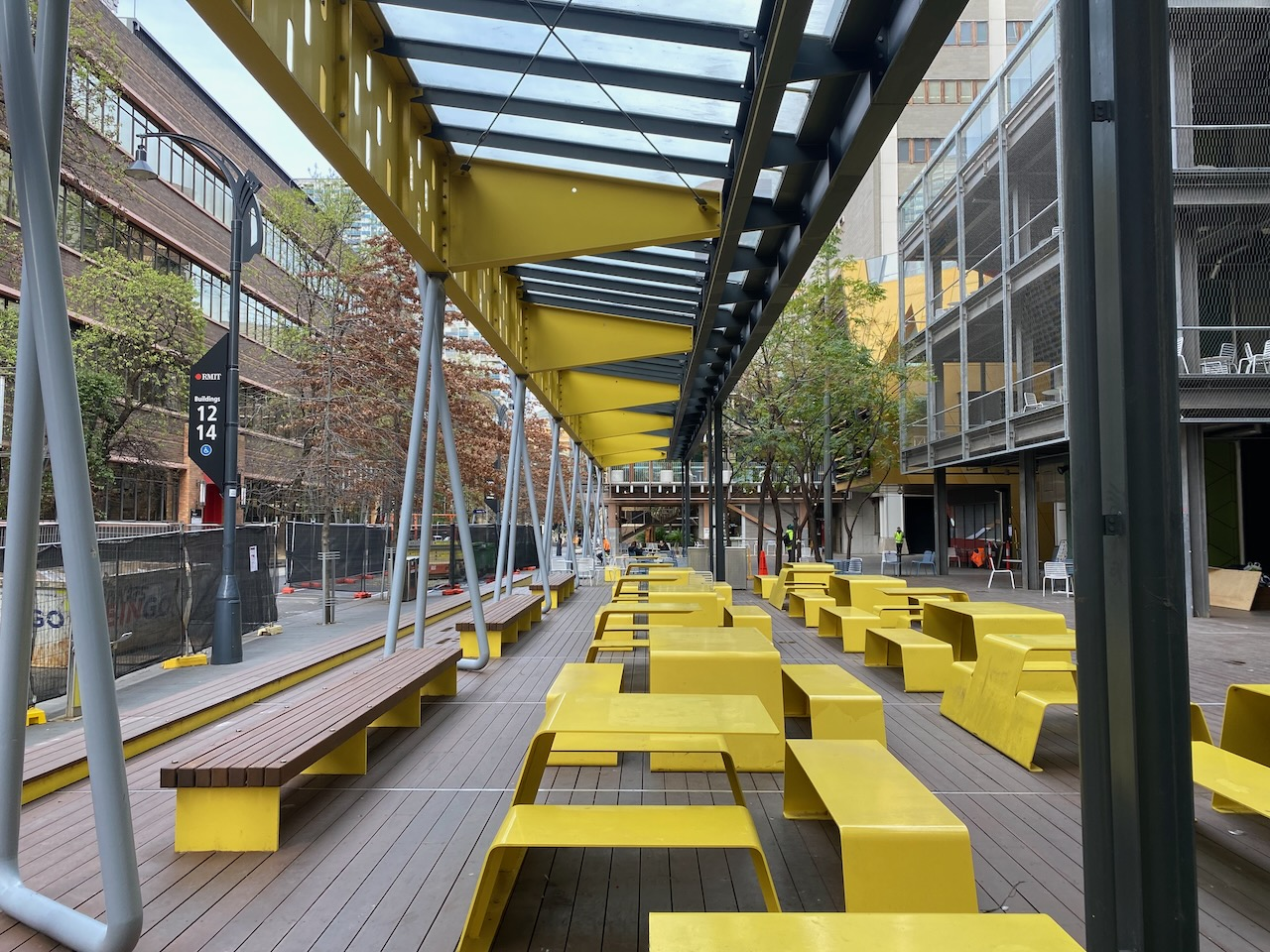
New Academic Street, RMIT, 2018 (joint winner)

=== 2018 Prize ===
Shortlisted nominees for the 2018 prize were; McAuley Community Services for Women by Hede Architects; Fitzroy North Library and Community Hub by Group GSA; New Academic Street, RMIT University (Bowen Street) by Lyons with NMBW Architecture Studio, Harrison and White, MvS Architects and Maddison Architects (Joint Winner) and; Nightingale 1 apartments by Breathe (Joint Winner).

Later in 2018 New Academic Street was awarded the National AIA Award for Urban Design. The 2018 Melbourne Prize jury was Shelley Penn (Shelley Penn Architect, chair), Simon Knott (BKK Architects) and Tania Davidge (Openhaus). The New Academic Street project was also awarded the Victorian Architecture Medal.

=== 2019 Prize ===
Shortlisted nominees for the 2019 prize were: Caulfield to Dandenong Level Crossing Removal by Cox Architecture with landscape architects Aspect Studios; Parliament of Victoria Members’ Annexe (winner) by Peter Elliott Architecture and Urban Design; Private Women’s Club by Kerstin Thompson Architects; South Melbourne Primary School by Hayball, and The Club Stand at Flemington Racecourse by Bates Smart. The 2019 Melbourne Prize jury was Jane Williams (John Wardle Architects, chair), Alix Smith (Hassell), and Stefano Scalzo (Victorian Health and Human Services Building Authority).

The Members' Annexe project was also awarded the 2019 Victorian Architecture Medal.

== 2020 to 2025 awards ==
=== 2020 Prize ===
The 2020 Melbourne Prize jury of three was chaired by Reno Rizzo (Inarc Architects) with Madeline Sewall (Breathe Architecture) and Minnie Cade (John Wardle Architects). The 2020 shortlist included the Carlton Learning Precinct COLA by Law Architects, Monash University Ian Potter Centre for Performing Arts by Peter Elliott Architecture and Urban Design and State Library Victoria Redevelopment by Architectus and Schmidt Hammer Lassen Architects. The State Library Victoria Redevelopment by Architectus and Schmidt Hammer Lassen Architects was presented the 2020 award in July.

=== 2021 Prize ===
The 2021 jury of three was chaired by Andrew Maynard (Austin Maynard Architects) with Sarah Bryant (Bryant Alsop Architects) and Sarah Zahradnik (NH Architecture). The 2021 shortlist considered for the award included the ACMI Renewal by BKK Architects and Razorfish; Carrum Station and Foreshore Precinct by Cox Architecture; Collins Arch by Woods Bagot and SHoP Architects; Docklands Primary School by Cox Architecture; Jackalope Pavilion by March Studio; Monash Woodside Building for Technology and Design by Grimshaw in collaboration with Monash University; Olderfleet also by Grimshaw; Prahran Square by Lyons and Springvale Community Hub also by Lyons. The 2021 prize was awarded to the Woodside Building for Technology and Design by Grimshaw Architects in collaboration with Monash University and was the most awarded project of the year also winning the Victorian Architecture Medal, Colorbond Award for Steel Architecture and an award for Sustainability and Educational Architecture categories.

=== 2022 Prize ===
The 2022 jury of three was chaired by Michael Roper (Architecture architecture) with jurors Nicholas Braun (Sibling Architecture) and Rhonda Mitchell (Woods Bagot). The shortlist for the prize included; Collingwood Yards by Fieldwork, Kia Arena by NH Architecture with RWA Sports Architecture. Queen and Collins by KTA and BVN, Rebuild La Mama by Meg White and Cottee Parker Architects, Victorian Pride Centre by Brearley Architects and Urbanists and Grant Amon Architects and Wesley Place, 130 Lonsdale Street by Lovell Chen with Cox Architecture.

The 2022 prize was awarded to KTA (Kerstin Thompson Architects) and BVN for Queen and Collins in Melbourne's CBD. The jury report said “there was just one [project] that we kept returning to, Queen & Collins, a richly layered urban space carved from a cluster of neo-gothic icons. What could ordinarily have been just another corporate lobby is now something else entirely. Light, space, colour and texture have been masterfully orchestrated to create a surprising new space for Melbourne.” Kerstin Thompson Architects are credited with the design of the ground plane and podium and BVN for the commercial workplace areas. Queen and Collins later won the AIA National Award for Commercial Architecture.

=== 2023 Prize ===
The 2023 jury of four was chaired by Kim Bridgland RAIA (Edition Office) with jurors Greta Stoutjesdijk RAIA (Candelapas Associates), Ilana Kister RAIA (Kister Architects) and Graduate Juror, Storm Bell, Affiliate RAIA, (BKK Architects). The shortlisted projects for the prize were Darebin Intercultural Centre by Sibling Architecture; the Melbourne Holocaust Museum by Kerstin Thompson Architects (KTA); Nightingale Village in Brunswick, developed by a multi architect team including Hayball, Breathe, Architecture architecture, Austin Maynard Architects, Clare Cousins Architects, Kennedy Nolan, Openwork and Andy Fergus; University of Melbourne Student Precinct in Carlton by Lyons with Koning Eizenberg Architecture, NMBW Architecture Studio, Greenaway Architects, Architects EAT, Aspect Studios and Glas Urban; Victorian Family Violence Memorial in St Andrews Reserve, Melbourne by Muir and Openwork; Wurun Senior Campus secondary school project in Fitzroy North by GHD Woodhead and Grimshaw. In describing the award process the jury citation noted "The projects that we have highlighted through shortlisting and in the awarding of the 2023 Melbourne Prize were those seen through the lens of community, narrative and city building, and within the lens of a city being an organic entity needing care and nourishment in order for growth and evolution to occur."

The 2023 winner announced on 16 June 2023, Nightingale Village a six apartment building precinct designed by six different architecture studios, was also the recipient of the Allan and Beth Coldicutt Award for Sustainable Architecture and Urban Design and Residential Architecture awards in the Multiple Housing categories. The jury described Nightingale Village as “a powerful catalyst to build community, prioritise social, economic and environmental sustainability. This project is not a group of standalone residential developments, like many through inner Melbourne, but an entwined shared environment that will change the way developers and architects visualise and contribute to our environment today and for generations to come”. The Nightingale Village presentation to the jury for the AIA Melbourne Prize as part of the Victorian Architecture Awards can be viewed on YouTube.

=== 2024 Prize ===
The 2024 jury appointed to judge the award was chaired by Suzannah Waldron (Searle x Waldron Architecture) with jurors Lauren Trainor (Eastop Architects) and Wojciech Pluta (Denton Corker Marshall) with graduate juror Senesios Frangos from ARM Architecture.

The five shortlisted projects for 2024 were Aboriginal Housing Victoria by Breathe, Mount Alexander College (MAC) by Kosloff Architecture, Victorian Heart Hospital by Conrad Gargett (now Architectus) and Wardle, Koorie Heritage Trust Stage 2 by Lyons with Greenaway Architects and Architecture Associates, Munro Development and narrm ngarrgu Library and Family Services by Six Degrees Architects and The Round by BKK Architects and Kerstin Thompson Architects.

At the 2024 Victorian Architecture Awards the Melbourne Prize was awarded to the Koorie Heritage Trust Stage 2 project by Lyons with Greenaway Architects and Architecture Associates. The jury citation described the project as "... not just an adaptation of space, but an important reconnection of the city with Country, culture and community, embodying the spirit of the Dimity Reed Melbourne Prize’s recognition of significant contributions to Melbourne’s cityscape."

=== 2025 Prize ===
The 2025 jury appointed to judge the award was chaired by Nick James (Architecture architecture) with jurors Lucia Amies (Architecture Media) and Delia Teschendorff (Delia Teschendorff Architects) with graduate juror Hugh Matthews.

A total of seven projects were shortlisted on 9 April 2025 included; Kangan Institute Health and Community Centre of Excellence by Architectus, Shiel Street North Melbourne Community Housing Project by Clare Cousins Architects, 120 Collins Street Revitalisation by Hassell, Truganina Community Centre by Jasmax (Canvas Projects), Melbourne Place by Kennedy Nolan, Pascoe Vale Primary School by Kosloff Architecture and Northern Memorial Park Depot by Searle x Waldron Architecture.

On 27 June at the 2025 Victorian Architecture Awards the Melbourne Prize was awarded to the Northern Memorial Park Depot by Searle x Waldron, which also took out the 2025 Victorian Architecture Medal.

=== 2026 Prize ===
The 2026 jury appointed to judge the award was chaired by Aimee Goodwin (Project 12 Architecture) with jurors Michael Roper (Architecture architecture), Marc Debney (Genton) and graduate juror Dea Cepeda (Winter Architect). Seven projects shortlised on 26 April 2026 included: Balam Balam Place by Kennedy Nolan, Finding Infinity and Openwork; Melbourne Metro Tunnel by Hassell, WW+P and RSHP; New Footscray Hospital by Cox Architecture and Billard Leece Partnership; St Kilda Pier Redevelopment by Jackson Clements Burrows Architects, Site Office Landscape Architecture and AW Maritime; Wyndham Law Courts by Lyons; Younghusband by Woods Bagot.

On 19 June at the 2026 Victorian Architecture Awards the Melbourne Prize was awarded to the St Kilda Pier redevelopment, which was also awarded the 2026 Victorian Architecture Medal.

== Recipients by year ==
Melbourne Prize Awards by year
Year	Winner	Project	Location	Type	Other AIA Awards
1997	Six Degrees Architects	Meyers Place (small bar)	Meyers Place, Melbourne CBD	Hospitality	Commercial Interior Award, 1997 (Vic)
1998	Daryl Jackson with Conran Design Partnership	Georges Redevelopment	162 Collins Street, Melbourne CBD	Retail/Commercial	Interior Award, 1998 (National)
1999	Nation Fender Katsalidis	Ian Potter Museum of Art	University of Melbourne, Swanston Street, Parkville	Cultural	Victorian Architecture Medal, 1999; Commendation for Public Architecture (National), 1999; William Wardell Award for Public Architecture, 1999 (Vic)
2000	Peter Elliott Architecture and Urban Design	Observatory Gate Precinct	Birdwood Avenue, Royal Botanic Gardens, Melbourne	Cultural	Institutional Merit Award, 2000
2001	NMBW	EQ Project, Riverside Terrace (Hamer Hall)	Victorian Arts Centre	Cultural	
2002	Gregory Burgess Architects	Sidney Myer Music Bowl Refurbishment	Kings Domain	Cultural	National Award for Enduring Architecture, 2009; Maggie Edmond Enduring Architecture Award, 2009
2003	Lab Architecture Studio and Bates Smart	Federation Square	Melbourne CBD	Cultural	Victorian Architecture Medal, 2003; Joseph Reed Award for Urban Design, 2003; Mahony Griffin Award for Interior Architecture (National Award), 2003
2004	ARM Architecture with Rush\Wright	Shrine of Remembrance, Visitor Centre and Gardens	Birdwood Avenue, Kings Domain	War Memorial	Victorian Architecture Medal, 2004; William Wardell Award for Public Architecture, 2004; John George Knight Award (Heritage Architecture), 2004; Walter Burley Griffin Award for Urban Design, 2004 (National)
2005	NH Architecture	QV Mixed Use Development	Swanston Street, Melbourne CBD	Retail/Commercial	Award for Residential Architecture, Multiple Housing, 2005; Urban Design Award, 2005; Architecture Award, 2005
2006	ARM Architecture	Melbourne Central Redevelopment (*Joint Winner)	Swanston Street, Melbourne CBD	Retail/Commercial	Award for Commercial Architecture, 2006 (Vic); Walter Burley Griffin Award for Urban Design, 2006 (National)
2006	John Wardle Architects, Hassell and NH Architecture in joint venture	The Urban Workshop (*Joint Winner)	50 Lonsdale Street, Melbourne CBD	Retail/Commercial	Marion Mahony Award for Interior Architecture, 2006; Sir Osborn McCutcheon Award for Commercial Architecture, 2006; Urban Design Award, 2006
2007	City of Melbourne in association with Nadim Karam and Marcus O’Reilly	Sandridge Bridge Precinct Redevelopment	Yarra River, Melbourne CBD	Urban Design	Urban Design Award, 2007
2008	Six Degrees Architects	The Vaults (Federation Wharf)	Yarra River, Melbourne CBD	Retail/Commercial	Planning Minister’s Heritage Award, 2008; Premier's Design Award, 2008
2009	Hayball Architects	Canada Hotel Redevelopment (Student Housing)	Swanston Street, Carlton	Residential	Best Overend Award for Residential Architecture, Multiple Housing, 2009 (Vic)
2010	Woods Bagot and NH Architecture	Melbourne Convention and Exhibition Centre	South Wharf, Melbourne CBD	Cultural	Victorian Architecture Medal, 2010; William Wardell Award for Public Architecture, 2010; Steel Architecture Award, Award for Sustainable Architecture, 2010
2011	Cox Architecture	Melbourne Rectangular Stadium	Olympic Boulevard, Melbourne	Sports	Victorian Architecture Medal, 2011; William Wardell Award for Public Architecture, 2011; Colorbond Award for Steel Architecture, 2011
2012	Billard Leece Partnership and Bates Smart	Royal Children's Hospital	50 Flemington Road, Parkville	Health	Victorian Architecture Medal, 2012; William Wardell Award for Public Architecture, 2012
2013	BKK Architects/TCL Partnership	Revitalising Central Dandenong, Lonsdale Street Redevelopment	Dandenong, Victoria	Urban Design	Walter Burley Griffin Award for Urban Design, 2013; Joseph Reed Award for Urban Design, 2013 (Vic)
2014	McBride Charles Ryan	Dallas Brooks Community Primary School	26–36 King Street, Dallas, Victoria	Education	National Award for Public Architecture, 2014; Victorian Architecture Medal, 2014; William Wardell Award for Public Architecture, 2014
2015	ARM Architecture with Rush\Wright	Shrine of Remembrance, Galleries of Remembrance	Birdwood Avenue, Kings Domain	War Memorial	Sir Zelman Cowen Award for Public Architecture, 2015; Victorian Architecture Medal, 2015; William Wardell Award for Public Architecture, 2015; John George Knight Award (Heritage Architecture), 2015; Urban Design Architecture Award, 2015
2016	Croxon Ramsay Architects	Saltwater Community Centre	153 Saltwater Promenade, Point Cook, Victoria	Cultural	Award for Sustainable Architecture, 2016
2017	M@ STUDIO Architects	2016 National Gallery of Victoria Architecture Commission (*Joint Winner)	National Gallery of Victoria Garden, St Kilda Road, Melbourne	Cultural	Commendation for Small Project Architecture, 2017
2017	John Wardle Architects with NADAAA	Tanderrum Bridge (*Joint Winner)	Batman Avenue, Melbourne	Urban Design	
2018	Breathe	Nightingale 1 apartments 'The Commons' (*Joint Winner)	9 Florence Street, Brunswick	Residential	Best Overend Award for Residential Architecture, Multiple Housing, 2018; Allan and Beth Coldicutt Award for Sustainabile Architecture, 2018
2018	Lyons with NMBW Architecture Studio, Harrison and White, MvS Architects and Maddison Architects	New Academic Street, RMIT University (*Joint Winner)	Bowen Street, Melbourne CBD	Education	Victorian Architecture Medal, 2018; Joseph Reed Award for Urban Design, 2018; Harry Bastow Award for Educational Architecture, 2018; Award for Interior Architecture, 2018; National Award for Urban Design, 2018
2019	Peter Elliott Architecture and Urban Design	Parliament of Victoria Members’ Annexe	Spring Street, Melbourne CBD	Public	National Award for Public Architecture, 2019; Victorian Architecture Medal, 2019; William Wardell Award for Public Architecture, 2019; Joseph Reed Award for Urban Design, 2019; Allan and Beth Coldicutt Award for Sustainable Architecture, 2019
2020	Architectus and Schmidt Hammer Lassen Architects	State Library Victoria Redevelopment	Swanston Street, Melbourne CBD	Cultural	
2021	Grimshaw Architects	Woodside Building for Technology and Design	20 Exhibition Walk, Clayton, Monash University	Education	Sir Zelman Cowen Award for Public Architecture, 2021; Victorian Architecture Medal, 2021; Colorbond Award for Steel Architecture, 2021; Award for Educational Architecture, 2021
2022	Kerstin Thompson Architects and BVN	Queen and Collins Development	376—390 Collins Street, Melbourne	Retail/Commercial	Award for Commercial Architecture, 2022; National Award for Commercial Architecture, 2022; Award for Interior Architecture, 2022; Award for Urban Design, 2022
2023	Architecture architecture, Austin Maynard Architects, Breathe, Clare Cousins Architects, Andy Fergus, Hayball, Kennedy Nolan and Openwork	Nightingale Village	Duckett Street, Brunswick	Residential	Award for Urban Design, 2023; Award for Multiple Housing, 2023; Allan and Beth Coldicutt Award for Sustainabile Architecture, 2023
2024	Lyons with Greenaway Architects and Architecture Associates	Koorie Heritage Trust; Stage 2	Birrarung Building, Federation Square, Melbourne	Cultural	Award for Interior Architecture, 2024; Commendation for Public Architecture, 2024
2025	Searle x Waldron	Northern Memorial Park Depot	Northern Memorial Park, 49 Sages Road, Glenroy	Cultural	Victorian Architecture Medal, 2025; Harry Seidler Award for Commercial Architecture, 2025 (National); Commercial Architecture Award, 2025 (Vic); Sustainable Architecture Commendation, 2025
2026	Jackson Clements Burrows Architects, Site Office Landscape Architecture and AW Maritime	St Kilda Pier Redevelopment	Pier Road, St Kilda	Urban Design	Victorian Architecture Medal, 2026; Joseph Reed Award for Urban Design, 2026 (Vic); National Commendation for Urban Design, 2026

== See also ==
- Australian Institute of Architects
- Australian Institute of Architects Awards and Prizes
- Victorian Architecture Awards
- Victorian Architecture Medal
- City of Melbourne
- Dimity Reed
