= William Wardell Award for Public Architecture =

Annual award in Victoria, Australia

- Awarded for: Public Architecture in Victoria
- Country: Australia
- Presented by: Australian Institute of Architects (Victoria Chapter)
- First award: 1996; 30 years ago
- Currently held by: Cox Architecture and Billard Leece Partnership, 2026
- Website: www.architecture.com.au/vic-awards

The William Wardell Award for Public Architecture is the highest honour awarded annually for public buildings in Victoria, Australia and is presented by the Victoria Chapter of the Australian Institute of Architects (AIA) at the Victorian Architecture Awards. It has been awarded 30 consecutive times from 1996 to 2026.

== Background ==
=== Definition of the award ===
The award recognises 'completed works of architecture of the highest quality' in the public architecture category. Previously the award was offered for 'institutional buildings' with winning and commended projects including a wider array of building types. In 1995 Wood Marsh was awarded the last Award of Merit, Institutional New, for Deakin University Stage 1.

Projects in this awards category must be predominantly of a public or institutional nature and generally fall within Building Code of Australia (BCA) Class 9, excluding projects within the definition of 'Educational Architecture or any BCA Class 9b building used primarily for educational purposes'. In 1997 the previous institutional awards were recategorised into separate and distinct public, educational and commercial categories.

A total of 16 of the 30 named awards (53%) presented between 1996 and 2026 were also awarded the top award, the Victorian Architecture Medal at the same awards.

=== Earlier award ===
In 1986 Denton Corker Marshall were awarded the William Wilkinson Wardell Medal for One Collins Street. The award was defined as 'best building of the last three years'.

=== Multiple winners ===
ARM Architecture (Ashton Raggatt McDougall) have won the award on five occasions: 1996, 2004, 2009, 2015 and 2016.

=== National awards for public architecture ===
Winners of this award are eligible for consideration in the annual national Australian Institute of Architects architecture awards for the Sir Zelman Cowen Award for Public Architecture, usually announced in October or November. Projects awarded either the Named Award or Architecture Awards in the William Wardell Award can also be considered for the National Award in the same year. To 2024 only three projects from Victoria have gone on to win the national named award.

=== William Wardell ===
The naming of the award recognises English born architect and civil engineer William Wardell (1823–1899). Wardell was appointed government architect in Victoria in 1858. He designed many important public and eccliastical buildings in Melbourne over a 20-year period. After being dismissed by the government Wardell moved to Sydney, extending his career as an influential and important public architect. He died in North Sydney in 1899.

== Named award winners ==
William Wardell Prize for Public Architecture by year
Year	Winner	Project	Location	Other AIA awards
2026	Cox Architecture and Billard Leece Partnership	New Footscray Hospital	89 Ballarat Road, Footscray	Urban Design Commendation, 2026 (Vic)
2025	Kerstin Thompson Architects	Eva and Marc Besen Centre	TarraWarra Museum of Art, Healesville	National Award for Public Architecture, 2025; Award for Interior Architecture, 2025 (Vic)
2024	Jackson Clements Burrows Architects	Berninneit Cultural and Community Centre	91—97 Thompson Avenue, Cowes	National Award for Public Architecture, 2024
2023	Wardle	Bendigo Law Courts	188 Hargreaves Street, Bendigo	National Commendation for Public Architecture, 2023; Commendation for Sustainable Architecture, 2023
2022	Brearley Architects and Urbanists with Grant Amon Architects	Victorian Pride Centre	79—81 Fitzroy St, St Kilda	National Award for Public Architecture, 2022
2021	Lyons	Springvale Community Hub	5 Hillcrest Grove, Springvale	Urban Design Award, 2021
2020	Terroir	Penguin Parade Visitor Centre	Phillip Island Nature Park, 1019 Ventnor Road, Summerlands	Regional Prize, 2020
2019	Peter Elliott Architecture and Urban Design	Parliament of Victoria Members' Annexe	Spring Street, East Melbourne	National Award for Public Architecture, 2019; Victorian Architecture Medal, 2019; Melbourne Prize, 2019; Joseph Reed Award for Urban Design, 2019; Allan and Beth Coldicutt Award for Sustainable Architecture, 2019
2017	Silver Thomas Hanley, DesignInc & McBride Charles Ryan	Victorian Comprehensive Cancer Centre (VCCC)	305 Grattan Street, Melbourne	Victorian Architecture Medal, 2017
2016	ARM Architecture	Geelong Library and Heritage Centre	51 Little Malop Street, Geelong	Sir Zelman Cowen Award for Public Architecture, 2016; Victorian Architecture Medal, 2016; Marion Mahony Award for Interior Architecture, 2016; Regional Prize, 2016
2015	ARM Architecture	Shrine of Remembrance; Galleries of Remembrance	Birdwood Avenue, Melbourne	Sir Zelman Cowen Award for Public Architecture, 2015; Victorian Architecture Medal, 2015; Melbourne Prize, 2015; John George Knight Award (Heritage Architecture), 2015; Urban Design Architecture Award, 2015
2014	McBride Charles Ryan	Dallas Brooks Community Primary School	26—36 King Street, Dallas	National Award for Public Architecture, 2014; Victorian Architecture Medal, 2014; Melbourne Prize, 2014
2013	Sean Godsell Architects in association with Peddle Thorp Architects	RMIT University Design Hub (Building 100)	150 Victoria Street, Carlton	Victorian Architecture Medal, 2013; Colorbond Award for Steel Architecture, 2013; National Award for Public Architecture, 2013
2012	Billard Leece Partnership and Bates Smart	Royal Children's Hospital	50 Flemington Road, Parkville	Victorian Architecture Medal, 2012; Melbourne Prize, 2012
2011	Cox Architecture	AAMI Park	Olympic Boulevard, Melbourne	Victorian Architecture Medal, 2011; Melbourne Prize, 2011; Colorbond Award for Steel Architecture, 2011
2010	Woods Bagot and NH Architecture	Melbourne Convention and Exhibition Centre	1 Convention Centre Place, South Wharf	Victorian Architecture Medal, 2010; Melbourne Prize, 2010; Steel Architecture Award, 2010; Award for Sustainable Architecture, 2010
2009	ARM Architecture	Melbourne Recital Centre and MTC Theatre Project, (Southbank Theatre)	31 Sturt Street, Southbank	Victorian Architecture Medal, 2009; Marion Mahony Award for Interior Architecture, 2009; Joseph Reed Award for Urban Design, 2009; Emil Sodersten Award for Interior Architecture, 2009 (National)
2008	John Wardle Architecture	Nigel Peck Centre for Learning and Leadership, Melbourne Grammar School	47 Domain Road, Melbourne	National Award for Public Architecture, 2008; Victorian Architecture Medal, 2008; Emil Sodersten Award for Interior Architecture, 2008
2007	Grimshaw Jackson Joint Venture	Southern Cross Station	Spencer Street, Melbourne	Victorian Architecture Medal, 2007; Walter Burley Griffin Award for Urban Design, 2007 (National)
2006	Minifie Nixon with Rush\Wright	Australian Wildlife Health Centre	Healesville Sanctuary	
2005	McBride Charles Ryan	Templestowe Park Primary School Multipurpose Hall	399 Church Road, Templestowe	Victorian Architecture Medal, 2006
2004	ARM Architecture	Shrine of Remembrance; Visitor Centre and Garden Courtyard	Birdwood Avenue, Melbourne	Victorian Architecture Medal, 2004; Melbourne Prize, 2004; John George Knight Award (Heritage Architecture), 2004; Walter Burley Griffin Award for Urban Design, 2004 (National)
2003	Sean Godsell	Woodleigh School Science Building	485 Golf Links Road, Langwarrin South	National Commendation for Public Architecture, 2003
2002	Lyons	Victoria University Online Training Centre, St Albans Campus	University Boulevard, St Albans	Victorian Architecture Medal, 2002
2001	Denton Corker Marshall	Melbourne Museum	11 Nicholson Street, Carlton Gardens, Carlton	Sir Zelman Cowen Award for Public Architecture, 2001; Victorian Architecture Medal, 2001
2000	John Wardle Architects and Demaine Partnership in association	RMIT Printing Facility, Brunswick Campus (later known as the International Centre of Graphic Technology, closed c.2014, now houses RMIT School of Fashion & Textiles)	Building 516, 25 Dawson Street, Brunswick	National Commendation for Public Architecture, 2000
1999	Nation Fender Katsalidis Architects	Ian Potter Museum of Art	Swanston Street, Melbourne	Commendation for Public Architecture (National), 1999; Melbourne Prize, 1999
1998	Wood Marsh with Pels Innes Nielson Kosloff	RMIT Building 220 (later known as Leo Foster Building, since 2014)	Clements Drive, RMIT Campus, Bundoora	National Commendation for Public Architecture, 1998
1997	Peter Elliott with Morton Dunn	Ballarat Town Hall refurbishment	225 Sturt Street, Ballarat	
1996	ARM Architecture	Storey Hall (RMIT Building 16)	336 Swanston Street, Melbourne	Victorian Architecture Medal, 1996; Marion Mahony Award for Interior Architecture, 1996 (Victoria); Interior Award (National), 1996

== See also ==
- Australian Institute of Architects
- Australian Institute of Architects Awards and Prizes
- Victorian Architecture Awards
- Walter Burley Griffin Award for Urban Design
- Sir Zelman Cowen Award for Public Architecture
- Maggie Edmond Enduring Architecture Award
- Melbourne Prize
