= Dimity Reed =

Australian architect, urbanist, writer and academic

Professor Dimity Alexandria Reed
- Born: 1942 (age 83–84); Parkes, New South Wales, Australia
- Education: Melbourne Girls Grammar, Melbourne University, RMIT University
- Occupation: Architect
- Practice: Dimity Reed & Associates

Dimity Reed AM (born 1942, Parkes, New South Wales, Australia) is an architect, urbanist and academic. She has been involved in government advisory roles, as well as writing for both The Sun and The Age newspapers.

== Early life ==
Dimity Reed was born in 1942 in Parkes, New South Wales, the middle child of two siblings. Her father worked at a local Coles store during that time, before being enlisted in the war and based out of New Guinea. When he returned from the war, the whole family moved to Victoria in 1946, taking up residence in South Melbourne, Victoria. She lived with her mother and older brother in a boarding house for itinerant workers run by her grandmother. During that time, South Melbourne was undergoing social change, where many of her neighbours and other tenants were being evicted from their homes as landlords were increasingly selling off properties to developers.

== Education ==
Dimity was schooled at Melbourne Girls Grammar School in South Yarra and later undertook a Bachelor of Architecture at Melbourne University immediately after secondary school. She married towards the end of her second year of the degree and was pregnant with her first child by the start of the fifth, causing her to put her architectural career on hold. She returned to study 10 years later, after giving birth to her three children, completing a Masters of Architecture at RMIT University.

== Career ==
After graduating in architecture Reed worked for Kevin Borland for a few years, but she was always interested in setting up her own private practice. When she expressed this to him, he was very supportive, and even gave her the current project she was working on — a house extension in Mt Eliza. She worked as a solo practitioner for many years, mainly residential and office alterations and renovations.

From 1978–1982, Dimity Reed was the Chief of Housing and Chief Executive Officer of the White Paper Secretariat on Public Housing in Victoria.

Reed has been involved in various organisations and planning committees throughout her life, including starting Women in Architecture, an organisation set up to cultivate female talent within a primarily male-dominated field.

As the movement continued to grow, a select number of women decided to run for the board of the Royal Australian Institute of Architects, with four making in on and Dimity becoming the first female president of the RAIA (Victorian Chapter). She used her new role to get younger architects involved in the institute (much like her housing commission work) and promoting their works and new philosophies on the city of Melbourne, introducing a new chapter of the RAIA and architecture within Melbourne.

Since then, Dimity has worked on a series of commissions and panels, notably the Shrine of Remembrance Trustees for the new underground 'Galleries of Remembrance' of which it was paramount in commissioning ARM for the project.

Dimity has always been involved in the active critiquing and discussion of architecture in the written media. She got her first writing job through Caroline Ross (a friend of Kevin Borland) who gave her a job at The Sun newspaper writing a weekly page on architecture in Melbourne, which also led to her writing for The Age newspaper and co-publishing a series of publications.

== Recognition ==
In 2023, the Victorian Chapter of the Australian Institute of Architects named the annually awarded Melbourne Prize, as the Dimity Reed Melbourne Prize, in recognition of her urban and architectural contributions to the city and the architectural profession.

== Notable projects ==
Despite working as a practising architect with her own practice, Dimity has predominantly been involved in the urban planning realm, acting as an architectural advisor on a lot of planning and government boards. As well as providing architectural discussions in Melbourne’s local papers and collaborative publications, she also served as the head of design at RMIT and a professor of urban design.

Dimity was also an elected Councillor with the City of St Kilda (1992-1994) and as a Commissioner of the City of Moreland (1994-1996)

In 2007 Dimity, with a small team, started work on the revitalisation of Dandenong City. The work was undertaken due to the city going through what Dimity describes as an “Urban Depression”. In 2006, the state government pledged $290 million to revitalise Dandenong in partnership with VicUrban and the Greater City of Dandenong. "Renovating a vast city follows the same process as renovating a house; it’s just that the implications are far-reaching, the costs are of a different order and the time lines stretch into the future".

Though she is now retired from the architectural sphere, Dimity is still very active on the homeground board (a no-income housing initiative) and heads up her own film production company, Mad Women Films in conjunction with her two filmmaker sons.

They have recently released a series of films of Wagner's four Ring operas. Alex Chernov said "While there are a number of recordings and analyses of the Ring Cycle, I understand that no-one has yet explained on screen how Wagner used the music to tell his complex story, how each character and each event has a musical motif that recurs throughout the four operas. All four episodes were produced in Melbourne by director Sam Reed and producer Professor Dimity Reed who worked with Professor Lees. In the result their work makes a valuable contemporary contribution to the array of material dedicated to the Ring Cycle".

== Publications ==
- ABZ of Pregnancy, co-authored with Professor Carl Wood. Nelson, 1972
- Exploring Language: Senior English, co-authored with Judith Womersley. Harcourt Brace and Jovanovich
- Exploring Language: A Stretch of the Imagination, co-authored with Judith Womersley. Harcourt Brace and Jovanovich
- Australia’s Guide to Good Residential Design, National Office of Local Government
- Need, Greed and Indifference: Making the Australian Suburb (In preparation)
- Melbourne in Spires, a calendar on 150 years of Australian architecture
- Tangled Destinies: The National Museum of Australia. Images Publishing, 2002
- Judging Architecture: Image Publishing, Contributor, 2003
- Carlton, A History, Contributor. Melbourne University Press, 2003
- I Believe This, Contributor, Random House, 2003

== Professional experience ==
=== Architectural practice ===
- Architect, Kevin Borland and Associates, 1972–77
- Director, Dimity Reed & Associates

=== Academic ===
- Head, Department of Design & Professor of Urban Design, RMIT, 1992–2001

=== State government ===
- In charge of publications for the restoration of Werribee Park, for the Department of the Premier, 1978
- Commissioner, Housing Commission of Victoria, 1978–1982
- Chief Executive, White Paper Secretariat: Victorian Government White Paper on Housing, 1981–82
- General Manager, Housing Services, Ministry of Housing, 1982–84
- Chair or Member of Panels hearing proposed Amendments to Planning Schemes, 1984–2005
- Part–time Member, Administrative Appeals Tribunal, Planning Division, 1989–94
- Member, Docklands Consultation Steering Committee
- Chair, Design Advisory Panel to the Melbourne Docklands Authority
- Member, Design, Amenity and Integration Panel, Docklands
- Design Advisor, VicUrban

=== Local government ===
- Councillor, City of St Kilda, 1992–94
- Commissioner, City of Moreland, 1994–96

=== Journalism, criticism and commentary ===
- Melbourne Editor, Vogue Living, 1970–1972
- Architecture writer, Herald Sun, 1982–1988
- Editor, Architect, 1984–86
- Urban Design commentator, The Age, 1988–present
- Editor, Building Today, 1992–94
- Editor, Antipodesign, 1994–1996
- Deakin Lecturer, Festival of Federation, 2001

== Architecture and urban design positions ==
- Founding member of the Association of Women in Architecture, 1978
- Board Member, Young Women's Christian Association (YWCA), 1978–2000
- Co-ordinator of Victorian pilot program (1979) and the national program (1980) for architecture in schools program, 1979–81
- Chairman of Directors, Archicentre Pty Ltd, home advisory division of the Royal Australian Institute of Architects, 1980–84
- RAIA State President, Royal Australian Institute of Architects (Victorian Chapter), 1984–86
- Co-ordinator, Melbourne Architecture Foundation, 2001–present

== Awards ==
- RAIA Bates Smart and McCutcheon Award for Architectural Journalism, 1988
- RAIA President’s Award for Architects In Schools Program, 1988
- RAIA President’s Award for an outstanding contribution to architecture, 1990
- RAIA President’s Award, Curation of the 'Home Sweet Home' Exhibition, LaTrobe Library, 1991
- RAIA Life Fellowship, 1992
- Honourable Mention, Southbank Housing Competition, 1993
- RAIA Bates Smart and McCutcheon Award for Architectural Journalism, 1996
- Centenary of Federation Medal, 2001
- Royal Australian Institute of Architects Roll of Honour
- Victorian Government Honour Roll of Women, 2003
- Member Order of Australia for contribution to Urban Design, to affordable housing and to sustainable housing, 2006

== See also ==
- Australian Institute of Architects
- Melbourne Prize
