= Walter Burley Griffin Award for Urban Design =

National Australian architecture award

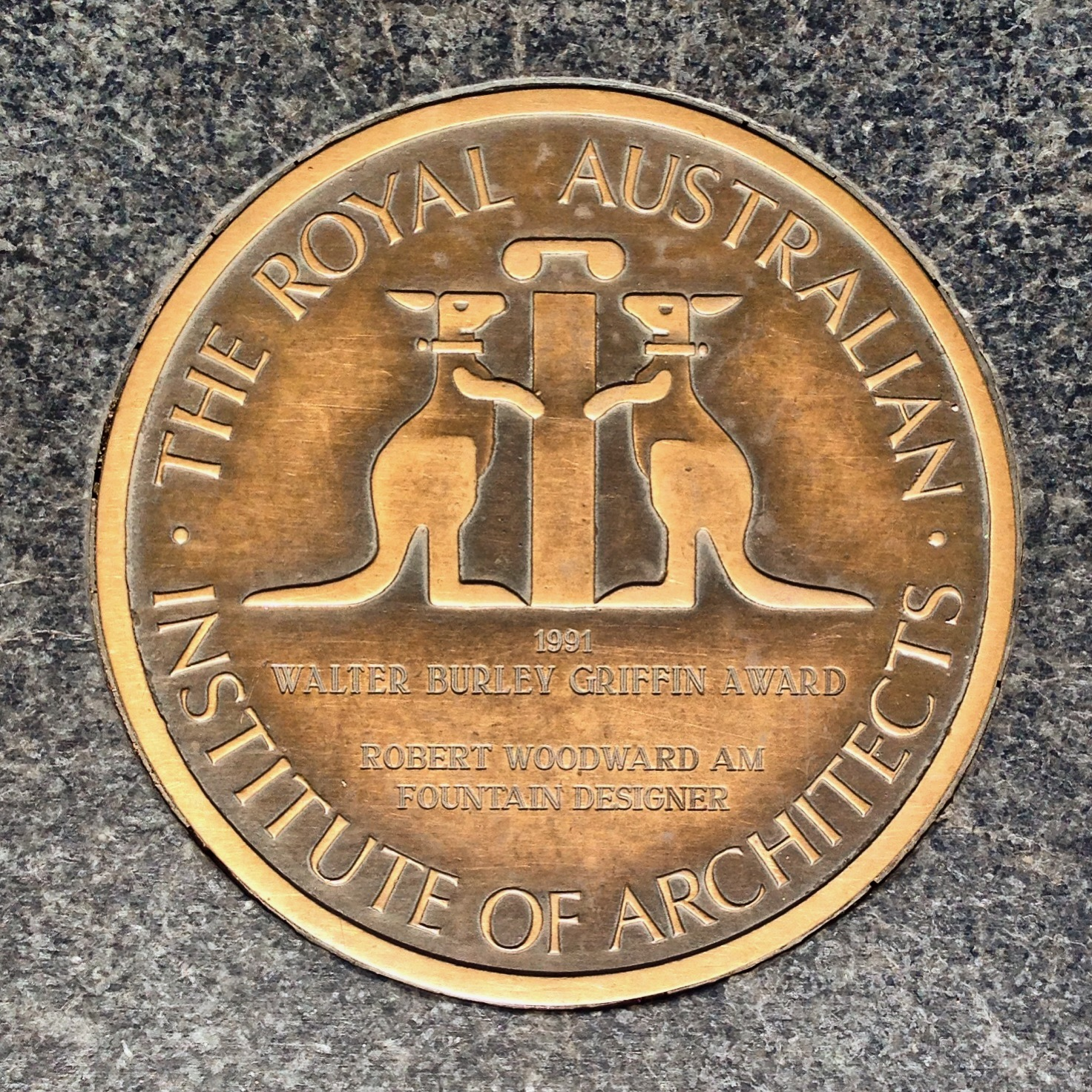
- 1991 Award for Darling Harbour Fountain by Robert Woodward
- Awarded for: Urban design
- Country: Australia
- Presented by: Australian Institute of Architects
- First award: 1988; 38 years ago
- Currently held by: Sydney Metro city stations, 2025

The Walter Burley Griffin Award for Urban Design is the annual named award for excellence in urban design in Australia as adjudicated and presented by the Australian Institute of Architects (AIA) at their national awards.

== Background ==
=== Definition of the award ===
According to the Australian Institute of Architects Policy No.13 on awards, prizes and honours, Category 9: Urban Design, projects in this category may be 'single structures, groups of structures or non-building projects, studies or masterplans, which are of public, civic or urban design in nature. Awarded projects must have enhanced the quality of the built environment or public domain or contribute to the wellbeing of the broader community.' In addition to the named award, the jury also can present National Awards for Urban Design and National Commendations for Urban Design.

=== Naming of the award ===
The award is named after United States born architect and landscape architect Walter Burley Griffin (1876–1937), designer of Australia's capital, Canberra. Soon after winning the design competition for Canberra he and his wife Marion Mahony Griffin established an influential design practice based in Australia from around 1914 to 1935.

=== Change from civic design to urban design ===
The national award was initially established by the RAIA as the Civic Design Award in 1988 and then named as the Walter Burley Griffin Award for Civic Design Award in 1990 and given annually through to 2002. In 2003 the award subject was changed from 'Civic Design' to 'Urban Design' to reflect changes in the architectural profession and the rise of 'urban design' as a specialisation and the more common terminology for architectural and city making projects of larger scale and community or public benefit.

=== Earlier awards for civic design ===
In 1959 the Civic Trust Awards were established in the United Kingdom as an awards system to recognise outstanding planning, urban design and architecture. In 1967 the Civic Trust of South Australia was established based on the UK Civic Trust Awards, and is now known as the Australian Civic Trust and although still a registered incorporated association in 2025 it has not been active since 2019.

In 1964 Robert Woodward was presented with the inaugural RAIA NSW Chapter Civic Design Award for the El Alamein Fountain in Kings Cross, Sydney. In 1967 Harry Seidler was presented with an RAIA Civic Design Award for Australia Square.In 1979 the NSW Chapter of the Institute of Architects named the state–based award as the Lloyd Rees Award for Civic Design. In 1980 Jørn Utzon was presented with a RAIA Civic Design Award for the Sydney Opera House.

== State based awards for urban design ==
The Australian Institute of Architects national awards jury selects a national winner each year from a shortlist made of up to eight selected state and territory urban design awards from AIA local chapter awards including;

- Australian Capital Territory: Sir John Overall Award for Urban Design
- New South Wales: Lloyd Rees Award for Urban Design (started 1964, named 1979)
- Northern Territory: George Goyder Award for Urban Design
- Queensland: Karl Langer Award for Urban Design
- South Australia: Gavin Walkley Award for Urban Design
- Tasmania: Dirk Bolt Award for Urban Design (started 2019)
- Victoria: Joseph Reed Award for Urban Design (named 1997)
- Western Australia: John Septimus Roe Award for Urban Design

Recipients of state–based awards (including commendatations) are then eligible for consideration for the Named Award, Architecture Award and Commendations for Urban Design presented later in the same year, as part of the national architecture awards. On some occasions state commendations have won the named Walter Burley Griffin Award.

== Recipients of Walter Burley Griffin Award for Urban Design ==
Winners of Walter Burley Griffin Award for Urban Design by year
Year	Architect	Project	Location	State	Type	Other AIA awards
2026	Collins and Turner with Aspect Studios, Eckersley O’Callaghan and Design 5 – Architects	Sydney Harbour Bridge Northern Access Cycleway (Patyegarang)	Sydney Harbour Bridge north, Alfred Street, Milsons Point	New South Wales	Transport	Urban Design Award (NSW), 2026
2025	Sydney Metro (multiple architects, artists and designers)	Sydney Metro City Stations	City Line Stations (Sydenham, Waterloo, Central, Gadigal, Martin Place, Barangaroo, Victoria Cross, Crows Nest)	New South Wales	Transport	Lloyd Rees Award for Urban Design, 2025 (NSW); NSW Architecture Medallion, 2025
2024	Grimshaw and Andrew Burges Architects with McGregor Coxall	Parramatta Aquatic Centre	7A Park Parade, Parramatta	New South Wales	Recreation	National Award for Public Architecture, 2024; Sir John Sulman Medal, 2024 (NSW)
2023	Lyons with Koning Eizenberg Architecture, NMBW Architecture Studio, Greenaway Architects, Architects EAT, Aspect Studios and Glas Urban	University of Melbourne Student Precinct	University of Melbourne, Carlton	Victoria	Education	Victorian Architecture Medal, 2023; National Award for Heritage Architecture, 2023; Henry Bastow Award for Educational Architecture, 2023 (Vic); Heritage Architecture Award for Creative Adaptation, 2023 (Vic); Joseph Reed Award for Urban Design, 2023 (Vic)
2022	SJB, Silvester Fuller, Studio Bright, Carter Williamson, Lippmann Partnership and Aspect Studios	Quay Quarter Lanes	Circular Quay, Sydney	New South Wales	Mixed Use	Aaron Bolot Award for Residential Architecture, Multiple Housing, 2022 (NSW); Urban Design Award, 2022 (NSW); Lord Mayor's Prize, 2022 (NSW)
2021	Lahznimmo Architects and Aspect Studios	Sub Base Platypus (Stage 1)	120 High Street, North Sydney	New South Wales	Heritage	Lloyd Rees Award for Urban Design, 2021 (NSW); Award for Heritage – Creative, Adaptation, 2021 (NSW)
2020	Hassell in collaboration with Turpin Crawford Studio and McGregor Westlake Architecture	Metro Northwest	Sydney	New South Wales	Transport	Lloyd Rees Award for Urban Design, 2020 (NSW); Commendation for Public Architecture, 2020 (NSW)
2019	Chrofi with McGregor Coxall	Maitland Riverlink	396 High Street, Maitland	New South Wales	Cultural	National Award for Public Architecture, 2019; NSW Architecture Medallion, 2019; Sir John Sulman Medal, 2019 (NSW); Blacket Prize, 2019 (NSW); Australian Urban Design Awards, Built Projects – City and Regional Scale, 2019
2018	Hassell and Populous	Darling Harbour Renewal	Darling Harbour	New South Wales	Cultural	Lloyd Rees Award for Urban Design, 2018 (NSW)
2017	FJMT	Frank Bartlett Library and Moe Service Centre	29 George Street, Moe	Victoria	Cultural	Commendation for Public Architecture, 2017 (Vic); Joseph Reed Award for Urban Design, 2017 (Vic)
2016	Lahznimmo Architecture	Bowen Place Crossing	Bowen Place, Canberra	ACT	Public Space	Canberra Medallion, 2016 (ACT); Sir John Overall Award for Urban Design, 2016 (ACT)
2015	Fender Katsalidis Architects	NewActon Precinct	Acton, Canberra	ACT	Mixed Use	Canberra Medallion, 2015 (ACT); Sir John Overall Award for Urban Design, 2015 (ACT); Heritage Award, 2015 (ACT); Award for Sustainable Architecture, 2015 (ACT) (for NewActon Nishi Hotel); Award for Interior Architecture, 2015 (ACT)
2014	Neeson Murcutt Architects in Association with City of Sydney	Prince Alfred Park and Pool Upgrade	Prince Alfred Park, Surry Hills	New South Wales	Recreation	National Award for Public Architecture, 2014; Sir John Sulman Medal, 2014 (NSW); Lloyd Rees Award for Urban Design, 2014 (NSW); City of Sydney Lord Mayor’s Prize, 2014 (NSW)
2013	BKK Architects/TCL Partnership	Revitalising Central Dandenong, Lonsdale Street Redevelopment	Lonsdale Street, Dandenong	Victoria	Public Space	Melbourne Prize, 2013 (Vic); Joseph Reed Award for Urban Design, 2013 (Vic)
2012	Peter Elliott Architecture and Urban Design	University Lawn Precinct, RMIT University	377 Russell Street, Melbourne	Victoria	Public Space	Architecture Award for Urban Design, 2012 (Vic)
2011	Hassell	one40william	140 William Street, Perth	Western Australia	Commercial	George Temple–Poole Award, 2011 (WA); Ross Chisholm Award for Commercial Architecture, 2011 (WA); John Septimus Roe Award for Urban Design, 2011 (WA)
2010	Hill Thalis Architecture and Urban Projects, Aspect Studios, CAB	Pirrama Park, Pyrmont	Pirrama Road, Pyrmont	New South Wales	Public Space	Award for Urban Design, 2010 (NSW)
2009	Hargreaves Associates, Lahznimmo Architects and Lacoste+Stevenson Architects	Armory Wharf Precinct	1 Jamieson Street, Newington Armory, Sydney Olympic Park	New South Wales	Public Space	Award for Urban Design, 2009 (NSW); Award for Commercial Architecture, 2009 (NSW)
2008	Rice Daubney, Allen Jack and Cottier and Group GSA in association with Civitas Urban Design and Planning	Rouse Hill Town Centre	Main Street, Rouse Hill	New South Wales	Town Centre	Lloyd Rees Award for Urban Design, 2008 (NSW)
2007	Grimshaw Jackson Joint Venture	Southern Cross Station	Spencer Street, Melbourne	Victoria	Transport	Victorian Architecture Medal, 2007; William Wardell Award for Public Architecture, 2007
2006	Ashton Raggatt McDougall	Melbourne Central Redevelopment	Spencer Street, Melbourne	Victoria	Mixed Use	Melbourne Prize, 2006 (Vic); Award for Commercial Architecture, 2006 (Vic)
2005	HPA, PTW, Tropman and Tropman, Bates Smart, Clive Lucas Stapleton and Partners	Walsh Bay Redevelopment	Hickson Road, Millers Point	New South Wales	Mixed Use	Lloyd Rees Award for Urban Design, 2005 (NSW)
2004	Ashton Raggatt McDougall	Shrine of Remembrance Visitor Centre and Garden Courtyard	Birdwood Avenue, Melbourne	Victoria	Cultural	Victorian Architecture Medal, 2004; William Wardell Award for Public Architecture, 2004 (Vic); John George Knight Award (Heritage Architecture), 2004 (Vic)
2004	City of Melbourne in association with Taylor Cullity Lethlean (Landscape), Paul Thompson (Planting) and Swaney Draper (Bridges and Federation Bells)	Birrarung Marr, Melbourne	Flinders Walk, Yarra River, Melbourne	Victoria	Public Space	Joseph Reed Award for Urban Design, 2004 (Vic); AILA Award of Excellence in Design, 2003
2003	Lab Architecture Studio in association with Bates Smart	Federation Square	Flinders Street, Melbourne	Victoria	Cultural	Victorian Architecture Medal, 2003 (Vic); Joseph Reed Award for Urban Design, 2003 (Vic); Mahony Griffin Award for Interior Architecture (National Award), 2003 (Vic)
2002	Gregory Burgess	Sidney Myer Music Bowl Refurbishment	Birdwood Avenue, Kings Domain	Victoria	Cultural	Melbourne Prize, 2002 (Vic); National Award for Enduring Architecture, 2009; Maggie Edmond Enduring Architecture Award, 2009
2001	University of South Australia (Chris Landorf and David Manfredi)	Line of Lode Miner’s Memorial & Visitors Centre	Federation Way, Broken Hill	New South Wales	Cultural	Urban Design Award of Merit, 2001 (SA)
2000	Peter Elliott Architecture and Urban Design in association with City Projects Division, City of Melbourne	RMIT University, Urban Spaces Project (Stage One)	RMIT University, Melbourne	Victoria	Public Space	Joseph Reed Award for Urban Design, 2000 (Vic)
1999	No Award					
1998	Wood Marsh Architecture/Pels Innes Neilson Kosloff	Eastern Freeway M3 Extension (Stage 3) Sound Barriers	Eastern Freeway, Doncaster, Melbourne	Victoria	Transport	Victorian Architecture Medal, 1998 (Vic); Joseph Reed Award for Urban Design, 1998 (Vic)
1997	Denton Corker Marshall	Pyrmont Bay Park, Stage 2	Pyrmont Point, Sydney	New South Wales	Public Space	Civic Design Merit Award, 1997 (NSW)
1996	Project Services, Queensland; Spence Jamieson, Alastair Baker	Cliffs Boardwalk Stage 2	Kangaroo Point foreshore, Brisbane River, Brisbane	Queensland	Public Space	
1995	Edmond and Corrigan in association with The Demaine Partnership	RMIT Building 8	383 Swanston Street, Melbourne	Victoria	Education	Victorian Architecture Medal, 1995 (Vic); Award for Institutional Alterations and Extensions, 1995 (Vic); City of Melbourne Award for Institutional Buildings, 1995 (Vic)
1994	Tonkin Zulaikha Harford Architects (joint winner)	The Rocks Square	The Rocks, Sydney	New South Wales	Public Building	Civic Design Merit Award, 1994 (NSW)
1994	Williams and Boag Architects (joint winner)	Tyne Street Redevelopment	Tyne Street, Carlton, Melbourne	Victoria	Residential	Victorian Architecture Medal, 1994 (Vic); Merit Award, Multiple Residential, 1994 (Vic)
1993	Cooks Carmichael Whitford in association with VicRoads	Bell—Banksia Street Freeway Link	Heidelberg, Melbourne	Victoria	Transport	
1992	Melbourne City Council, Urban Design Branch (Rob Adams)	Urban Design of City of Melbourne	Melbourne CBD	Victoria	Urban Design	
1991	Robert Woodward	Fountain at Darling Harbour titled 'Tidal Cascade'	Darling Harbour, Sydney	New South Wales	Public Space	RAIA Civic Design Merit Award, 1991 (NSW); AILA National Civic Design Award, (NSW)
1990	Cocks Carmichael Whitford	Yarra Footbridge, Southbank (now Evan Walker Bridge)	Yarra River, Southbank, Melbourne	Victoria	Public Space	Maggie Edmond Enduring Architecture Award, 2018
1989	No Award					
1988	NSW Public Works Department, Architectural Division with Allen Jack and Cottier, Conybeare Morrison and Partners, Hall Bowe and Webber, and Lawrence Nield and Partners	Circular Quay and Macquarie Street Redevelopment for the Australian Bicentenary 1988	Macquarie Street, Sydney	New South Wales	Public Space	Lloyd Rees Award for Civic Design, 1988

== Distribution of Awards ==
From 1988 to 2025 almost 90% of awards presented (34 of 38) were located in Victoria and New South Wales.

Awards by Australian state or territory, 1988—2024, by location of project (total 38 awards)
1. Victoria (17 Awards) (44.7%)
2. New South Wales (17 Awards) (44.7%)
3. Queensland (2.60%)
4. Tasmania (0.00%)
5. Western Australia (2.60%)
6. Northern Territory (0.00%)
7. South Australia (0.00%)
8. Australian Capital Territory (5.30%)

== See also ==
- Australian Institute of Architects
- Australian Institute of Architects Awards and Prizes
- Australian Urban Design Awards
- Lloyd Rees Award for Urban Design
