= Searle x Waldron =

Searle x Waldron is an Australian architecture firm based in St Kilda, Melbourne. It is an emerging firm co-founded by Nick Searle and Suzannah Waldron in 2007. The firm focuses on projects ranging from small scale residential to larger scale urban master-planning. Some of their notable projects and design competitions include the MoCAPE (Museum of Contemporary Art & Planning Exhibition) and Art Gallery of Ballarat Annexe which have managed to attain various awards from the Australian Institute of Architects, including the 2012 Colorbond Award for Steel Architecture and 2012 Architecture Award for Public Architecture Alteration & Additions. Their designs have been exhibited across Australia and throughout Asia and Europe.

== Partners ==
Nick Searle and Suzannah Waldron first met each other in their first year of undergraduate study in Sydney's UTS before moving to Melbourne to complete their degree.

=== Nick Searle ===
Since graduating in 2001 from Deakin University, Searle has gained a wide variety of experience working for several Architectural firms internationally. The firms include Allford Hall Monaghan Morris, UK and Erick van Egeraat Architects, Netherlands and BVN Architecture, Australia where he was involved in design, documentation and contract administration for a broad range of projects. Aside from building his practice, he is also encouraging the future of Architectural design by teaching in an architectural and urban design studio in RMIT University, School of Architecture & Design.

=== Suzannah Waldron ===
Since graduating from RMIT University, Waldron has gained a wide variety of experience working for several Architectural firms internationally. The firms include Office for Metropolitan Architecture, Rotterdam and dRMM (de Rijke Marsh Morgan Architects), London where she was involved in the design works of projects ranging from civic buildings to commercial and retail. Some of these projects include Prada, the City of Ghent and Cornell University. Waldron was also selected to exhibit her works in the National Design Centre's "Do Not Crop" Exhibition held at Federation Square in 2008. Along with Searle, she is also leading an architectural and urban design studio in RMIT University, School of Architecture & Design.

== Significant projects ==
=== MoCAPE ===
MoCAPE: Museum of Contemporary Art & Planning Exhibition (MoCAPE) was an open competition for an international art institution located in Shenzhen, China, covering an area of 80,000sqm with a budget of US$100 million. The site sits within the Shenzhen civic masterplan, which features a new library and concert hall by Arata Isozaki. Searle X Waldron's design proposal was for 2 spaces that are connected by cultural facilities that covers about 30,000sqm. There were 170 entries from around the world but Searle X Waldron managed to win a position in the final 4 and was invited for a second round proposal in collaboration with Arup.

Their work was exhibited in National Design Centre, Melbourne.

=== Art Gallery of Ballarat Annexe ===
Searle X Waldron was commissioned by the City Of Ballarat and the Art Gallery of Ballarat, the project had completed construction in 2011. The brief for the project was to expand on the existing heritage listed structure of The Art Gallery of Ballarat and create a suitable space to be used for conduction of Lectures, Workshops, Art installations, and Community Functions. Its design also caters for the option to facilitate private functions which operate independently from the other gallery spaces.

The project combines the attributes of three specific structures – Public hall for Mix programs, Verandah as a transitional space and a Bandstand as an Event Space. By incorporating these three ideas in one flexible space Searle X Waldron have designed a building which has multiple uses and has become a focal point for public addresses in the City of Ballarat. The project was awarded the 2011 Award for Public Architecture and the Colorbond Award for Steel Architecture from the Victorian Chapter of the Australian Institute of Architects.

== Architectural/urban landscape projects ==
- Art Gallery of Ballarat Annexe – 2011 – Ballarat, Australia
- Northern Memorial Park Depot
- Majorca House – Centre Place, Melbourne
- Footscray Town Hall – Footscray, Victoria (In progress)
- Little House on a Laneway – Seddon, Melbourne (In Progress)

== Other projects ==
- Las Vegas Studio – Exhibition Design – RMIT Design Hub

== Awards ==
- 2025 Harry Seidler Award for Commercial Architecture, Northern Memorial Park Depot
- 2025 Melbourne Prize, Northern Memorial Park Depot
- 2025 Victorian Architecture Medal, Northern Memorial Park Depot
- 2025 Commercial Architecture Award (Vic), Northern Memorial Park Depot
- 2025 Sustainable Architecture Commendation (Vic), Northern Memorial Park Depot
- 2016 Nicholas Murcutt Award for Small Project Architecture, Maidstone Tennis Pavilion
- 2012 Colorbond Award For Steel Architecture Australian Institute of Architects – Victorian Chapter Awards for Anexxe, Art Gallery of Ballarat
- 2012 Architecture Award, Public Architecture Alterations and Additions Australian Institute of Architects – Victorian Chapter Awards] for Anexxe, Art Gallery of Ballarat
- Winner, Commercial Interior [2012 Intergain Timber Vision Awards] – Anexxe, Art Gallery of Ballarat
- Highly Commended, Public Space [2012 IDEA – Interior Design Excellence Awards] – Anexxe, Art Gallery of Ballarat
- Shortlist, Emerging Designer of the Year [2012 IDEA – Interior Design Excellence Awards] – Anexxe, Art Gallery of Ballarat
- Commendation, Public Design [2012 Australian Interior Design Awards] – Anexxe, Art Gallery of Ballarat
- Commendation, Color in Commercial Design [2012 Australian Interior Design Awards] – Anexxe, Art Gallery of Ballarat
- First Prize [UN-Habitat Open International Competition 2008] – Mobility Centre & City Spatial Design
- Joint First Prize, Invited 2nd Stage Finals [Open International & Invited Competition 2007] – MoCAPE (Museum of Contemporary Art & Planning Exhibition)
- Honorable Mention, [Open International Competition 2007], GBD Art District
- Shortlisted Finalist, Open International Competition 2009, Green Water City Urban Park
