= John Wardle =

John Wardle may refer to:

- John Wardle (businessman) (born 1944), English businessman; former chairman of Manchester City football club
- John Wardle (architect), Australian architect
- Johnny Wardle (1923–1985), English cricketer
- John Wardle, birth name of Jah Wobble (born 1958), English bass guitarist

== See also ==
- Irving Wardle (1929–2023), English theatre critic and author.
