= Six Degrees Architects =

Practice information
- Partners: Peter Malatt; Mark Healy; James Legge; Simon O'Brien; Sarah Bennett; Michael Frazzetto
- Founders: Craig Allchin; Mark Healy; James Legge; Peter Malatt; Simon O'Brien; Dan O'Loughlin
- Founded: 1991
- Location: Melbourne, Australia

Significant works and honors
- Buildings: Meyers Place Bar; The Vaults; Wall Cafe; Public Office; University of Tasmania, School of Architecture; Ferrars and York Apartments
- Awards: Melbourne Prize 1997 & 2008 Frederick Romberg Award 2024

Website
- www.sixdegrees.com.au

Six Degrees Architects is an Australian architectural practice based in Melbourne, Victoria. It was formed in 1991 by six architecture graduates sharing a studio in Richmond.

The "Six Degrees" name was inspired by the Nylex Clock in Richmond, which displayed a cold 6°C one night. The name also circumvented the requirement for architectural registration in the early years of their practice, and was a reflection of the status of the six partners having six Bachelor of Architecture degrees. Recycled and salvaged materials became part of their architectural language. This approach played out in their self-funded project, Meyers Place Bar, which later received the inaugural Melbourne Prize in 1997.

== Notable projects ==
- Meyers Place, Melbourne, 1994 (Melbourne Prize, 1997)
- Public Office, West Melbourne, 1997
- Wall 280, Balaklava, Melbourne, 1999
- Kooyong Lawn Tennis Club, 2000
- Pelican, St. Kilda, Melbourne, 2002
- School of Architecture, University of Tasmania, Launceston, 2007
- The Vaults Precinct, Yarra River, Melbourne, 2008 (Melbourne Prize, 2008)
- St Mary's House of Welcome, 2010
- The Boatbuilders Yard, South Wharf, Southbank, Melbourne, 2011
- Ferrars and York Apartments, 201—209 Ferrars Street, South Melbourne, 2024 (Best Overend Award, 2024 & Frederick Romberg Award, 2024)
