= South Melbourne Primary School =

Primary School in Melbourne

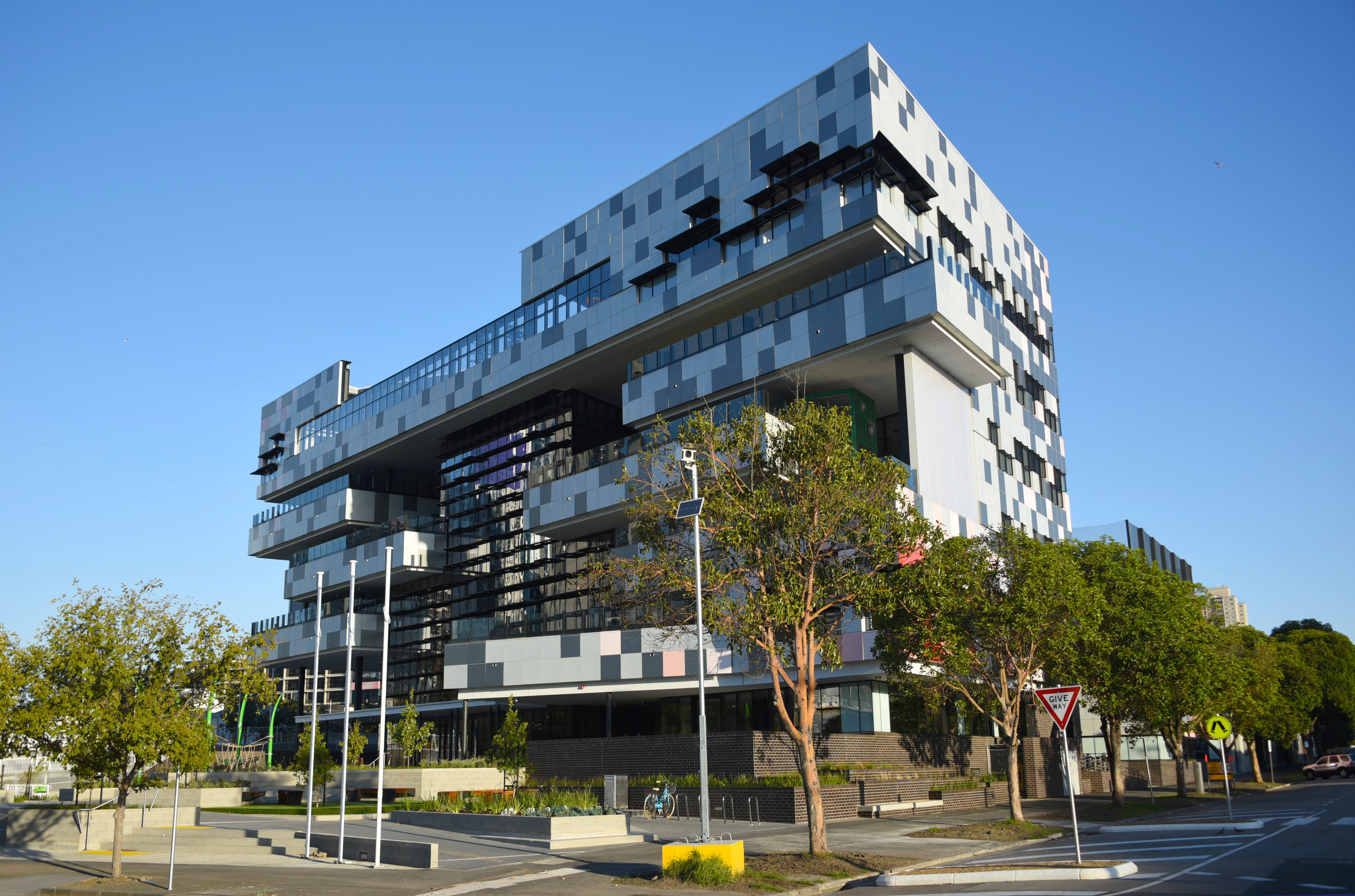

Location
- 129-161 Ferrars Street; Southbank, Victoria

Information
- Established: 2018
- Principal: Noel Creece
- Years offered: Prep–Year 6
- Website: southmelbourneps.vic.edu.au

South Melbourne Primary School is a public co-educational primary school located in inner-city Melbourne suburb of Southbank. Established in 2018, it was the first high-rise state school in Victoria, at five storeys. It is administered by the Victorian Department of Education, the school serves students from Prep to Year 6.

== History ==
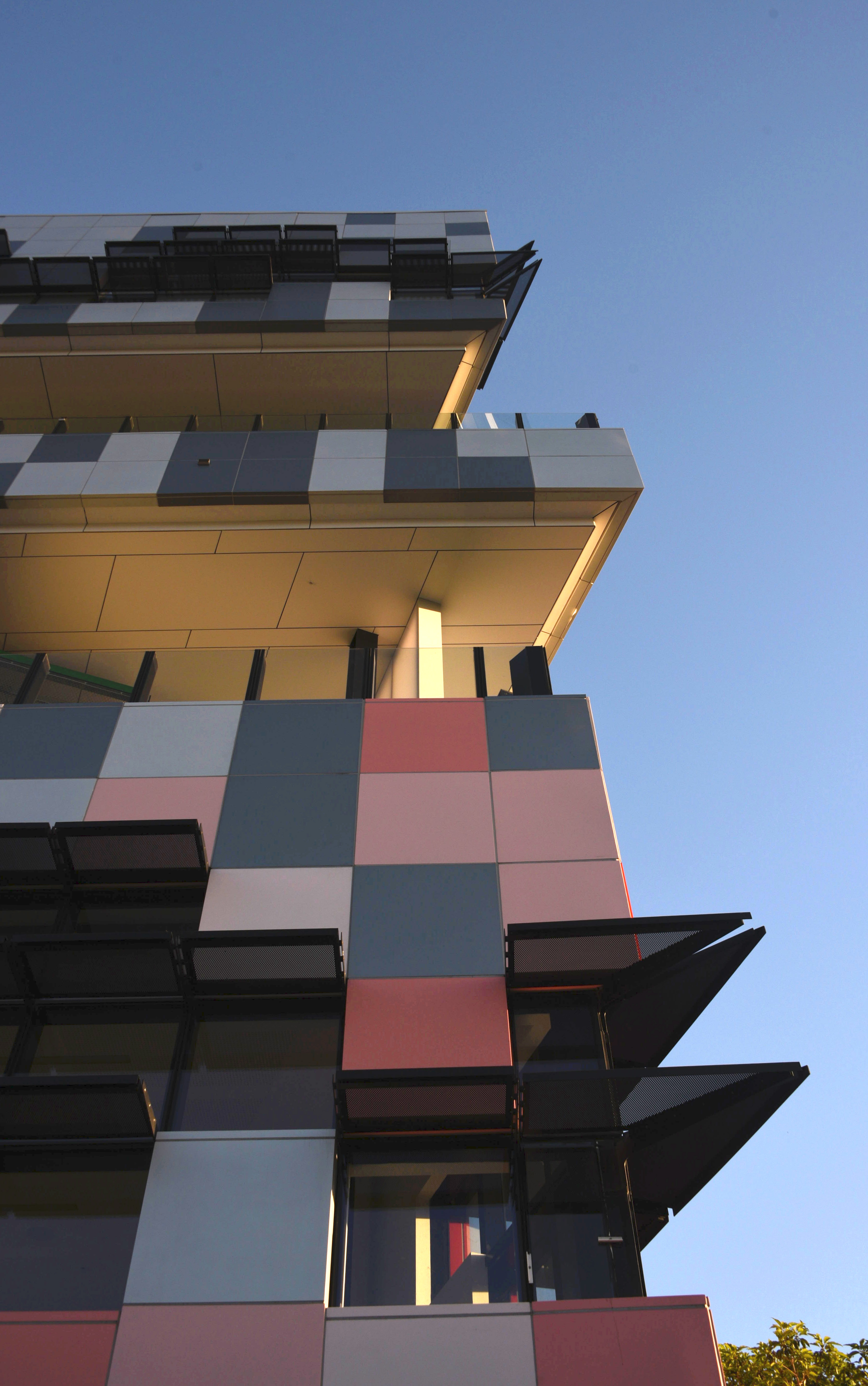
Detail of South Melbourne Primary School, 2018.

A school with the name of South Melbourne Primary School existed on Dorcas Street in South Melbourne until 31 December 1996. It merged with Albert Park Primary School as part of the Kennett government's austerity program which lead to the closure of hundreds of schools in the 1990s. Southbank residents campaigned for more schools to meet growing demand.

In 2015, the state government bought adjacent land for $19 million, as part of the Ferrars Street Education and Community Precinct. It would open as "Kirrip Park", with kirrip meaning friendship or mate in the Boon Wurrung language.

Plans for the school were released in 2016 for construction in the Fishermans Bend urban renewal area. The school opened in 2018, with capacity for 525 students. Due to the high demand, students outside the school's boundary were rejected from the school.

In 2026, the state government announced a plan to open a new campus for the school, to expand the student capacity by 250. It is scheduled to open in 2029.

== Architecture ==
South Melbourne Primary School was designed by Australian architecture practice Hayball. It is the first among a new model of "vertical schools" to open in Victoria. The project won several awards, including the Future Project of the Year at the 2016 World Architecture Festival awards held in Berlin. It was praised for "the connection between indoor and outdoor teaching areas and differentiated learning environments". While there was some concern about a school without access to green space, principal Noel Creece stated that 80 percent of South Melbourne residents had moved from densely populated cities, including Mumbai, Beijing, and Shanghai, were vertical schools where common.
