= Victorian Architecture Awards =

Architecture awards, Victorian Chapter, Australian Institute of Architects

The Victorian Architecture Awards are granted annually by the Victorian Chapter of the Australian Institute of Architects. They began with the Street Architecture Medal, awarded between 1929 and 1942. Apart from a single award in 1954, annual awards did not resume until 1964, backdated by one year.

== Awards and Prizes ==
The most prestigious award has been variously called the Medal, the Bronze Medal, or Merit Award, but since but since 1987 it has been called the Victorian Architecture Medal.

The numbers and categories of awards has expanded and changed over the years. Since the 1990s, some categories have been named after significant architects or firms who have practiced in Victoria.

=== Awards ===
- Victorian Architecture Medal (started 1929 as RVIA Street Architecture Medal)
- William Wardell Award for Public Architecture (started 1996)
- Harold Desbrowe-Annear Award for Residential Architecture Houses – New (started 1996)
- Marion Mahony Award for Interior Architecture (started 1996)
- Sir Osborn McCutcheon Award for Commercial Architecture (started 1997)
- Joseph Reed Award for Urban Design (started 1997)
- Dimity Reed Melbourne Prize (started 1997, named 2023)
- Maggie Edmond Enduring Architecture Award (started 2003, named 2023)
- John George Knight Award for Heritage Architecture, Conservation/Creative Adaptation (started 2005)
- Best Overend Award for Residential Architecture – Multiple Housing (started 2007)
- Allan and Beth Coldicutt Award for Sustainable Architecture (named 2013)
- Kevin Borland Award for Small Project Architecture (started 2013)
- Henry Bastow Award for Educational Architecture (started 2015)
- John and Phyllis Murphy Award for Residential Architecture Houses – Alterations and Additions (named 2017)
- Colorbond Award for Steel Architecture
- EmAGN Project Award

=== Prizes ===
- Victorian President’s Prize (started 2000)
- Regional Prize (started 2001)
- Bates Smart Award for Architecture in the Media (National, State and Advocacy categories)
- Victorian Emerging Architect Prize
- Victorian Student Ideas Prize
- Victorian Graduate Prize
- Robert Caulfield Graduate Research Scholarship
- Sinclair–Nelson Drawing Scholarship

== Discontinued Awards ==
- RVIA Street Architecture Medal (1929—1942)
- The Age RAIA House of the Year Award (1972—1979)
- The Age Public Award (1987—1989)
- Robin Boyd Environmental Award (1972—1981)
- Community Design Awards (1975—1977)
- Project Housing Award (1978—1979)
- Environmental Design: Urban and Community Design Award (1978—1986)
- Walter Burley Griffin Award for the Environment (1982—1985)
- Environmental Award (started 1982)
- ACROD/RAIA Award (1979—1982)
- Energy Efficient Buildings (Medal) 1982
- President's Award: Young Architects 1982
- William Pitt Award for Restoration (started 1984)
- Robert Joseph Haddon Medal for Excellence in Architecture (1985)
- Rejuvenated Housing, Rejuvenated Buildings, Recycled Buildings
- William Wilkinson Wardell Award (for individuals) (1983)
- John George Knight Award (for individuals) (1983)
- ACI Award for Innovation (1984—1987)
- Institutional
- Ecclesiastical
- Industrial
- Recreational
- Domestic

=== Robin Boyd Environmental Award 1972–1981 ===
After the death in 1971 of influential Victorian architect and writer Robin Boyd, a posthumous award was established by the Victorian Chapter in 1972. The state based award ceased in 1981 when the national Robin Boyd Award for new housing was established as part of a new national awards program.

Robin Boyd Environmental Award by Year
Year	Award	Winner	For	Reference	Other
1972	Named Award	Merchant Builders	Contribution to housing development in Melbourne		
1972	Award of Merit	The Melbourne Times	For responsible community reporting		
1972	Award of Merit	Ruth and Morrie Crow	For contribution to planning literature and issues in Melbourne		
1973	Bronze Medal	Carlton Association	For their Report No.5 Urban Renewal, Carlton — An analysis		
1973	Award of Merit	Department of Fisheries and Wildlife	For the management and development of Tower Hill		
1973	Award of Merit	Fitzroy Fun Factory	For their use of recycled materials		
1974	Bronze Medal	Victorian Public Interest Research Group Ltd	For Dandenong Ranges project		
1974	Citation	Centre for Environmental Studies, University of Melbourne and the Western Port Regional Planning Authority	For a study on landscape assessment of the southern Mornington Peninsula		
1975	Bronze Medal	Ellis Stones (1895—1975)	Posthumous award for his work as a landscape designer		
1975	Citation	Australian Government	For environmental protection and conservation initiatives 1974—1975		
1975	Citation	Interplan Pty Ltd	City of Melbourne Strategic Plan		
1975	Citation	Western Port Regional Planning Authority	Western Port Conservation Plan		
1976	Bronze Medal	David Yencken (Chairman)	The Interim Committee of the National Estate		
1976	Citation	Dr E Graeme Robertson	For his work in recording and documenting ornamental cast iron (posthumous)		
1976	Citation	Randell Champion and Paul Thompson	Koonung–Mullum Freeway Action Plan		
1976	Citation	Barbara Niven (Director), Interim Committee of the National Estate (Sponsor)	Historic Conservation Areas Project		
1977	Bronze Medal	May Moon	For her work as founder and secretary for 27 years of the Save the Dandenongs League		
1977	Citation	Residents of Golf Links Estate, Croydon	Implementation of a private street scheme		
1977	Citation	Western Port Regional Planning Authority	Phillip Island Capability Study prepared by the Centre for Environmental Studies under Professor George Seddon (Director)		
1977	Citation	Victorian Public Interest Research Group Ltd	For their report A Coastal Retreat		
1978	Bronze Medal	The Friends of the Organ Pipes Group, Victorian National Parks Association	Rehabilitation and conservation of the Organ Pipes National Park		
1978	Bronze Medal	Fitzroy Collingwood Rental Housing Association	A pilot residential house association		
1978	Citation	Social Education Materials Project — Urbanism Team	Social Education Material Project Urbanism Kit		
1979	Bronze Medal	Town and Country Planning Board, Shire of Maldon, and Jacobs–Lewis & Vines	Maldon Historic Conservation Project		
1979	Citation	Conservation of energy working group of Conservation Council of Victoria	Publication Seeds for change: creatively confronting the energy crisis		
1980	Bronze Medal	Anne Latreille, Journalist, The Age	Initiative in establishing the Environs columns		
1981	Bronze Medal	Dr Tim Ealey	Pioneering concepts in environment by people other than architects		
1981	Bronze Medal	Linda Stevenson	Work with North Melbourne Library in extension of the concepts and roles of community library services		

Source: Judging Architecture, Victorian Architecture Awards 1929—2003 Goad, Gollings, Pigeon

== 2024 Awards ==
In 2024 the AIA Victoria Chapter received the largest total entries of all Australian States and Territories chapters with 228 submissions across 15 categories for judging. At the awards held on Friday 7 June 2024 a total of 15 named awards, 24 architecture awards and 22 commendations were presented.

== 2025 Awards ==
In 2025 the AIA Victoria Chapter received a total of 384 submissions across 15 categories with 126 projects shortlisted for the awards. The awards were held on 27 June 2025 presenting a total of 19 named awards, 21 architecture awards, and 17 commendations.

== 2026 Awards ==
On 24 April 2026, 120 projects were shortlisted in 15 categories. A total of 64 winners and commendations were announced at the awards night held on 19 June 2026.

== Publications ==
To mark the 75th Victorian Architecture Awards in 2003, the Institute published Judging Architecture – Issues, Divisions, Triumphs, which listed all awards from 1929 to 2003.

== See also ==
- Australian Institute of Architects
- Australian Institute of Architects Awards and Prizes
- Victorian Architecture Medal
- Maggie Edmond Enduring Architecture Award
- National Award for Enduring Architecture
- Dimity Reed Melbourne Prize
