= Hayball =

Australian architectural practice

- Type: Architectural practice
- Industry: Architecture
- Founded: 1983
- Founder: Len Hayball, Richard Leonard, Robert Stent
- Headquarters: Melbourne, Australia
- Number of locations: 3
- Key people: Tom Jordan (Managing Director); Len Hayball; Richard Leonard; Robert Stent; Sarah Buckeridge; Luc Baldi; Ann Lau
- Services: Architecture, interior design, urban planning
- Number of employees: Approx. 170

Hayball is an Australian architectural practice with studios in Melbourne, Sydney and Brisbane offering architecture, interior design and urban planning services. Hayball works include residential, commercial, education and institutional projects, as well as urban design. The practice currently employs approximately 170 staff.

== History ==
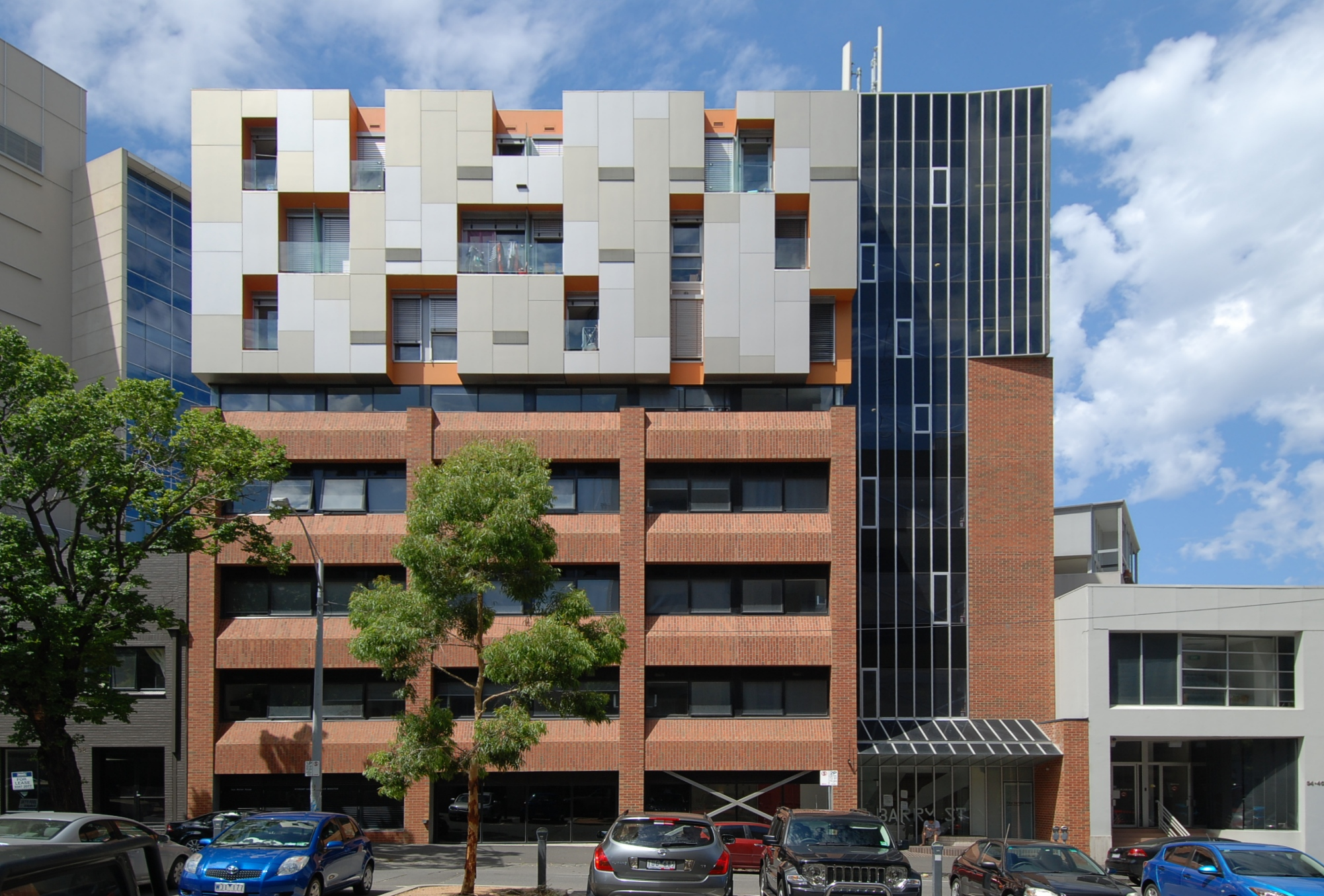
Student housing, Barry Street, Melbourne

The practice was established in 1983 as Hayball Leonard Stent and re-branded as Hayball in early 2008. The firm is led by seven directors - Len Hayball, Richard Leonard, Robert Stent, Tom Jordan, Sarah Buckeridge, Luc Baldi and Ann Lau. Currently, Tom Jordan is managing director.

== Awards ==
Hayball won the Australian Institute of Architects' Award for Residential Architecture and the 2009 Melbourne Prize for the redevelopment of the Canada Hotel on Swanston Street, Carlton. The design for Dandenong High School won the Department of Education and Early Childhood Development Best School and Best Secondary School at the 2009 awards.
