= Williams Boag =

Australian architectural company

WILLIAMS BOAG architects (WBa)

Practice information
- Firm type: Socially responsible architecture
- Partners: Gary Boag, Peter Williams
- Founded: 1975
- Location: Melbourne, Australia

Williams Boag, now known under the name WILLIAMS BOAG architects (WBa), is a Melbourne-based architectural practice that describes itself as a socially responsible design practice with a focus on modernist principles. Aesthetically Williams Boag's designs most closely resemble that of contemporary Scandinavian architecture. Williams Boag is a company with a single director, Peter Williams.

WILLIAMS BOAG architects has designed many buildings over 35 years of practice and have received numerous awards over 35 years of practice including significant Royal Australian Institute of Architects (RAIA) awards.

== Partners ==
Peter Williams was born in Melbourne. He studied at the Royal Melbourne Institute of Technology (RMIT). Completing the Fellowship Diploma of Architecture in 1971, where he received the John Story Memorial scholarship in his second year. Peter Williams' work prior to the partnership with Garry Boag included architects Kevin Borland and Daryl Jackson.

Gary Boag was born in Melbourne and died of lung cancer at the age of 56.

Peter Williams and Gary Boag meet while working together at the offices of architect Daryl Jackson. In 1975 Boag joined Williams and formed the partnership Peter Williams and Gary Boag which later became known as Williams Boag.

The office began in Carlton in 1974, subsequently moving to various city locations. At the end of 2011, WBa left its city address in William Street and relocated to 51 Leicester street Carlton. In 2010 the practice acquired the Bendigo architectural company Ward Carter A+C, a previous occasional project partner, to continue operation under WILLIAMS BOAG architects as the practice's regional office. As of end of 2011 Williams Boag employed 35 staff.

== Recent projects ==
- John Knox Church, Brighton, Victoria. Completed in 2009, originally built in 1867, the church is a landmark to the area, and the renovation required Williams Boag to be sensitive in their design.
- General Post Office, Melbourne. Originally completed in 1867, Williams Boag worked on the renovation and restoration project for 14 years, with the works completed in November 2004. The renovation has received the Royal Australian Institute of Architects (AIA) commercial architecture award in 2005, and the RAIA (Victorian Chapter) Sir Osborn McCutcheon Commercial Architecture Award for Commercial Architecture 2005.
- Centre for Theology and Ministry, University of Melbourne. Completed in March 2007; won the Australian Institute of Architects Award for Heritage Architecture (VIC) in 2008.
- Gungahlin Senior College, Canberra. Completed in 2010. It will accommodate up to 900 students and include a jointly owned gym and library.

== Awards ==
Williams Boag has been the recipient of many awards, in particular 2005 when they took out the RAIA Commercial Architecture Award for both the Victorian Chapter and National Award for their General Post Office, Melbourne conversion.

2005

- RAIA (Victorian Chapter) Sir Osborn McCutcheon Commercial Architecture Award for Commercial Architecture - Melbourne GPO Redevelopment
- RAIA The Commercial Architecture Award - Melbourne GPO Redevelopment
- RAIA The Special Jury Award - Oasis Housing, Inkerman Oasis Project
- Planning Institute Australia Award for Planning Excellence, Planning Ministers Award - Jointly awarded to Williams Boag and the City of Maribyrnong

2007

- Master Builders Association of Victoria, Excellence in Construction Awards: Commercial Buildings $10 Million to $20 Million - Centre for Theology and Dalton McCaughey Library, University of Melbourne
- Architectural Excellence in the South East Awards, Best Commercial or Industrial Building - Montalto Vineyard & Olive Grove

2008

- RAIA Heritage Architecture (VIC) Award - Centre for Theology and Ministry, University of Melbourne

2009

- City of Whitehorse, Building a Better City Design Awards: Mayoral Award - Box Hill High School
- City of Whitehorse, Building a Better City Design Awards: Environmentally Sustainability Award - Box Hill High School
- City of Whitehorse, Building a Better City Design Awards: Best Institutional Building Award - Box Hill High School
- Dulux Interior Design Awards, Sustainable Interiors Award - TAC Headquarters Geelong
- Architectural Excellence in the South East Awards, Outstanding Building Conservation - St Kilda Town Hall, Port Phillip Accommodation

2010

- School Design Awards 2010, Best school design above 3.5 million - Altona P-9 College
