= Eli Giannini =

Australian architect

Eli Giannini, AM
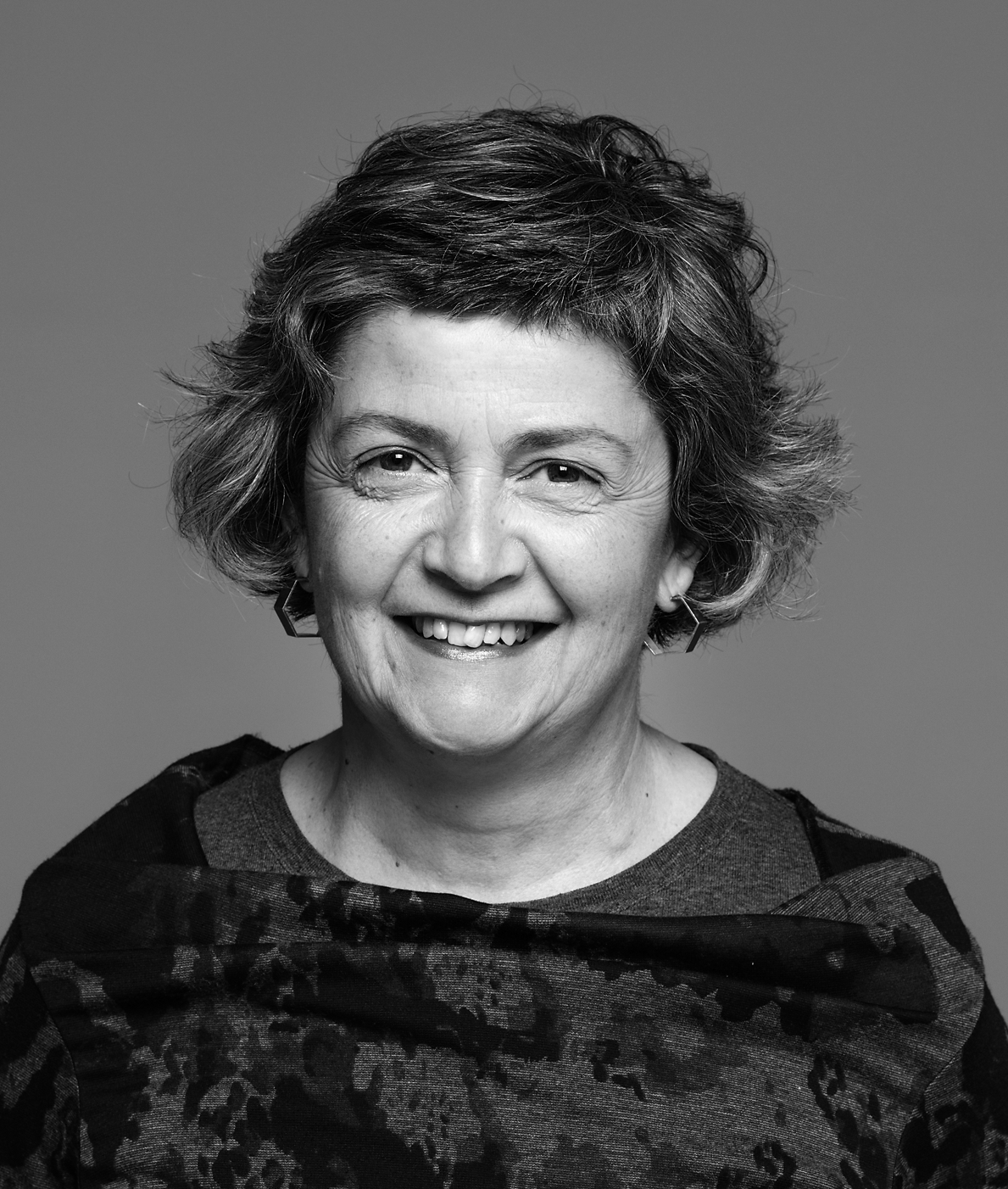
- Born: 1956 (age 69–70); Rome, Italy
- Education: RMIT University
- Occupation: Architect
- Awards: RAIA Life Fellow (2008)
- Practice: MGS Architects
- Buildings: Bendigo Library (2013); McIntyre Drive Apartments (2012); Kyme Place Rooming House (2012); TAC headquarters (2009); Woodstock Rooming House Balaclava (2007); New Quay restaurant (2003)

Eli (Elisabetta) Giannini AM (born 1956 in Rome, Italy) is an Australian architect and director of MGS Architects in Melbourne. Giannini completed her architectural undergraduate studies at RMIT University in 1983 and Master of Design (Thesis) in 1903, entitled ‘Metro-scape’. Soon after her undergraduate studies in 1989, she joined MGS Architects with Robert McGauran and Mun Soon. In 2002 she was selected as President of the Victorian Chapter of the Australian Institute of Architects, a position occupied until 2004.

== Personal life ==
Giannini was born in the historic city of Rome, Italy in 1956, and when she was 15 her family made the decision to migrate to Australia, which bought her to Melbourne. Giannini considers herself privileged to have had the experience of living in two cities, garnering a wealth of experience. Giannini came from a family of no other architects but feels that a possible influence may have been the many gallery excursions she experienced with her mother and grandparents. For Giannini, her personal and professional life share many overlaps. McGauran Giannini Soon (or MGS, Giannini's architectural practice) was established in 1985 with her brother in law and co-name partner; Rob McGauran. Giannini also works alongside her husband meaning that the trials and tribulations of architecture are a family affair. Giannini feels that a significant influence to her professional work from her personal life would be becoming a mother, which changed her perspective on a variety of issues. Her personal views have led to her being a strong advocate for women in the field of architecture, stating in an Australian Institute of Architects Victorian Chapter publication from the summer of 2013, that in the future she hopes to be “Surrounded by powerful women in leadership positions.”

== Past experiences ==
During her time in Rome, Giannini was educated on how design and art enriches life and wellbeing. Giannini considers the education system being different in Rome, as it allows a more in-depth experience of your chosen field at an earlier age, than the teaching system she found after her arrival in Australia. Completing her early stages of study in Rome, Giannini didn't start her involvement in art and architecture until after her move to Australia, completing her undergraduate Architectural degree in 1983 at RMIT University, Melbourne. In 1993 after her first 10 years in a practice, Giannini furthered her thinking through research, following her enrollment in a Masters of Urban Design where she completed a thesis entitled 'Metro-scape'. Years on, she started working alongside well-known artists such as Neil Taylor (Icon Pavilions) and Matthew Johnson (Glenroy Community Centre). Giannini also started a number of successful collaborations with Sue Buchanan, who had a background of both Architecture and Fine Arts. Working together they created sculptures that had won multiple awards. Giannini became associated with professional organizations some of which she is still a part of. From 2000 to 2002, Giannini had the position of a University Council member at RMIT University and was a Director of RMIT training. During her time on the University Council, Giannini was also on the Building Committee, giving her the position as the chair of RMIT School of Architecture and Design – Program Advisory Committee. From her time in 2002–2004, Giannini handled a number of committees and task forces including her position being appointed as President of the Victorian Chapter of the Australian Institute of Architects. She sits on the Australian Institute of Architects' National Gender Equity Committee and also a Member of the 'Room to Create' Committee City of Yarra.

In 2023 Giannini was appointed a Member of the Order of Australia (AM) for significant service to architecture, and to the arts.

== Mentor ==
During her studies at RMIT University, Peter Corrigan was one of her design lecturers and tutors. He has influenced and inspired a generation of architects who practice today, including Eli Giannini. Soon after she graduated, Giannini was employed at Williams Boag architects, where she was provided with training and mentorship. There was a great quantity of experience she gained from firms such as Williams Boag architects, Peter McIntyre and also Spowers, as well as self-learning from books, magazines and travels to destinations she researched.

== Notable projects ==
=== 2003 ===
New Quay restaurant

Sir Osborn McCutcheon Award for Commercial Architecture

=== 2007 ===
Woodstock Rooming House Balaclava

The RAIA Award for Residential Architecture-Multiple Housing (VIC) Woodstock Rooming House is housing project positioned over a council car park that blends within its local context for struggling individuals. It to integrate the “ground level entry facilities at the southern end to link into the adjoining residential street. The higher building is located over the parking towards the shopping strip and adopts the brick warehouse character of Woodstock Street”

=== 2009 ===
TAC headquarters

The Australian Institute of Architects Award for Commercial Architecture (VIC) The Transport Accident Commission (TAC) Corporate Headquarters in Geelong was “developed to address social, environmental and economic issues on balance”. Also with keeping with its heritage of the existing ‘Bow Truss’ Wool Store.

=== 2012 ===
Kyme Place Rooming House

Port Melbourne Victorian Institute of Architects' award for multi-residential housing. Kyme place rooming house is affordable housing constructed above a council car park in Port Melbourne for those in need. Nicknamed “the tree house”. It is An exemplar for social housing as it tries to create a sense of a village with its "colourful brickwork, bay windows and timber screens shaped like cumulus."

McIntyre Drive apartments

2013 Australian Institute of Architects' National Architecture Awards for Multiple Housing category – Frederick Romberg Award McIntyre Drive Social Housing is a 69-apartment development project that is designed to be respectful of the neighbourhood's surroundings providing independent living for residents with disabilities whilst encouraging social interaction through communal spaces and gardens. The buildings “social sustainability has been deeply considered by the architects, resulting in a non-institutional response that provides an exemplar for social housing and homes for many happy residents”

=== 2013 ===
Bendigo Library

2014 Australian Institute of Architects Victorian Architecture Award – Public Architecture (Alterations and Additions) Commendation (State Prizes) Regional Prize Bendigo Library redevelopment is a community space that is accessible and engaging for all sectors of the public to use. The architecture assists users to find their way. The building spaces flow, and are linked by an internal street with views that open onto areas inviting people to explore and participate.
