= Daryl Jackson =

Australian architect (1937–2026)

Daryl Jackson AO
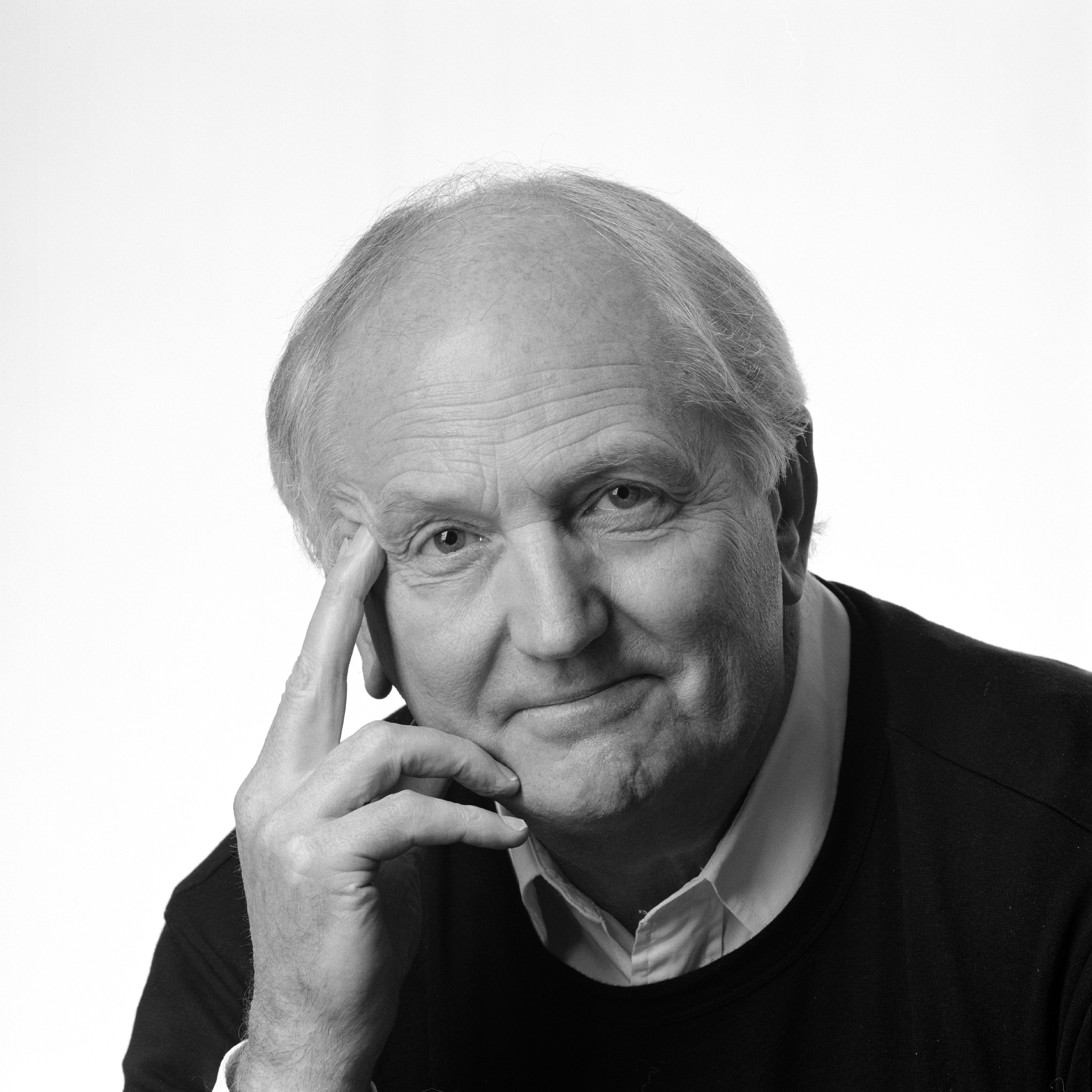
- Daryl Jackson in 2004
- Born: 7 February 1937; Clunes, Victoria, Australia
- Died: 21 February 2026 (aged 89)
- Citizenship: Australia
- Education: RMIT, University of Melbourne
- Occupation: Architect
- Years active: 1960—2025
- Awards: Sir Zelman Cowen Award for Public Architecture 1981 & 1984, Australian Institute of Architects Gold Medal 1987, Victorian Architecture Medal 1970, 1973, 1974, 1976, 1978 & 1992, Canberra Medallion 1978, 1984, 1985, 1987, 1991, 1992, 1997, 1999 & 2000, Sir Roy Grounds Award for Enduring Architecture, 2012 & 2026, Maggie Edmond Enduring Architecture Award 2020
- Practice: Jackson Architecture; Daryl Jackson Robin Dyke; Daryl Jackson Alistair Swayn; Jackson Walker (1965—1978)
- Buildings: Harold Holt Memorial Swimming Centre, Canberra School of Art, AIS Swimming Halls, MCG Great Southern Stand, The Gabba, County Court of Victoria

Daryl Sanders Jackson AO (7 February 1937 – 21 February 2026) was an Australian architect who designed alone or with partners numerous notable large scale projects across Australia and internationally, ranging from schools and colleges to sports facilities, office blocks, hospital wings, and residential complexes. The designs included stylistic influences from Brutalism and High Tech to Postmodernism and Deconstructivism, and the firm as won numerous awards since in the 1970s. Jackson was also an educator as an associate professor at the University of Melbourne and Deakin University.

== Early life ==
Jackson was born on 7 February 1937 in Clunes, Victoria, Australia, and was educated at Wesley College in Melbourne. He completed a diploma in architecture at the Royal Melbourne Institute of Technology (RMIT), then moved to the University of Melbourne, graduating with a Bachelor of Architecture in 1959. After working with architects in Melbourne, Sydney, he married his wife Kaye and they spent some years living overseas. Daryl worked in London for Chamberlin Powell & Bonn, best known for the Brutalist landmark of the Barbican Centre, and in the United States for Paul Rudolph, a seminal figure in the development of Brutalism and 'megastructures'.

== Architectural career ==
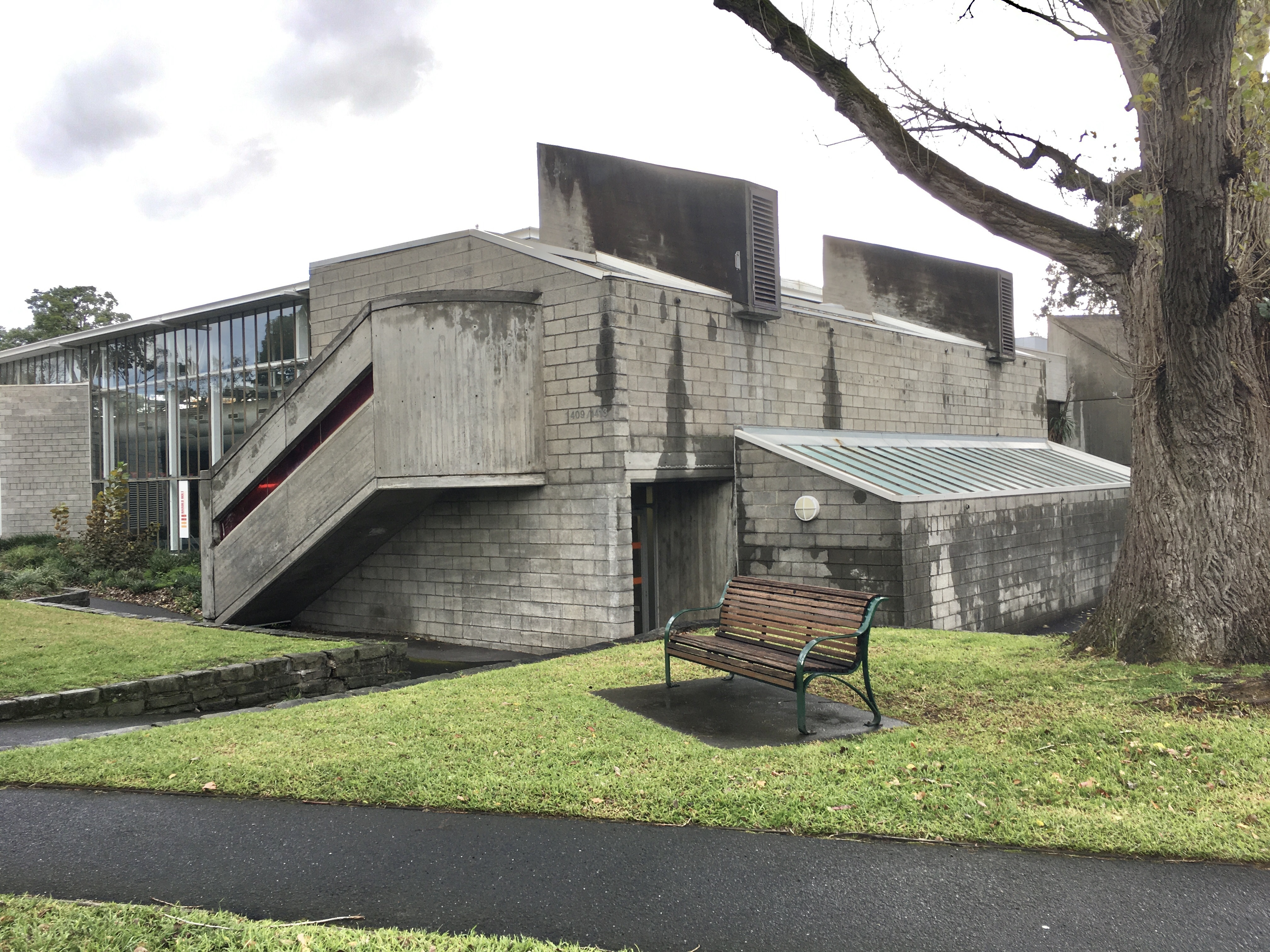
Harold Holt Memorial Swimming Pool, 1969, corner

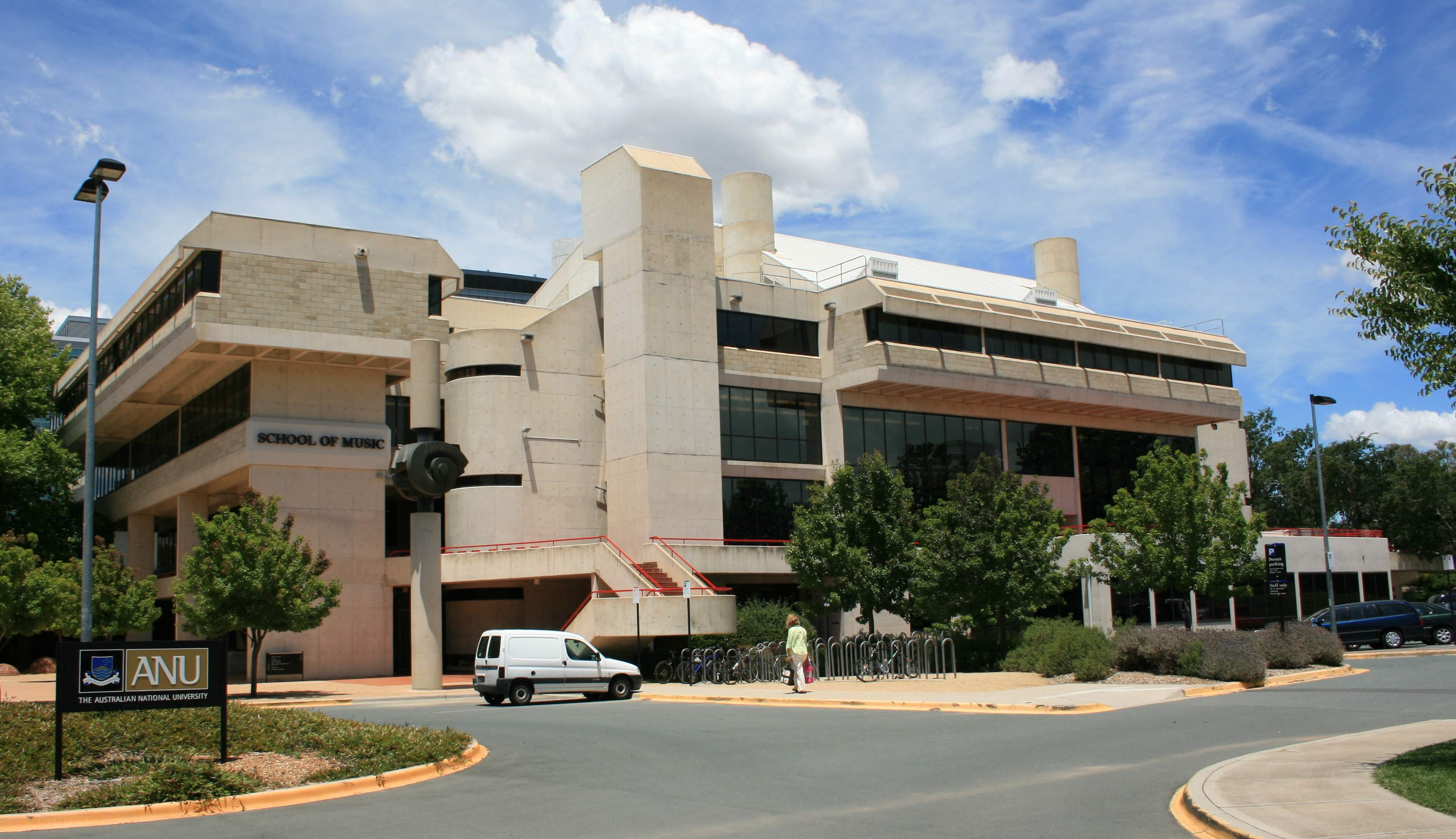
Canberra School of Music, 1976

=== Jackson Walker ===
He returned to Melbourne in 1964, and established his first practice, with fellow University of Melbourne graduate Evan Walker. Walker later moved to Canada in 1965, where he lived and worked until 1969. The Jackson Walker office was in a terrace in East Melbourne with other architects, including Kevin Borland, sharing staff and expertise. In about 1966 Borland collaborated with Jackson on is first notable project, the Harold Holt Memorial Swimming Centre, which opened in 1969. The pool was the seminal example of the Victorian version of the Brutalist style, with bare concrete, concrete block walls, sculptural forms and directed movement through the building via ramps and stairs, and is now on the Victorian Heritage Register.

In 1969 Jackson Walker were one of a number of noted architects tasked with designing houses for the new Elliston Estate in Rosanna a suburb in the north of Melbourne developed by Merchant Builders, a planned subdivision with common gardens without fences and similarly styled low slung brick and timber designs.

Though a young practice, Jackson Walker then worked principally on large scale projects. One early area of success was in schools, designing Lauriston Girls School Special Studies Building (1969), a bold red brick design wrapping around a courtyard, which won the RAIA (Vic) Bronze Medal in 1970. This was followed by Princes Hill High School (1972) in bold Brutalist concrete style, which also won the Bronze Medal, and the even bolder form of the R.A.W. Woodgate Resource Centre at MLC the next year, which won a Bronze Medal in the General Buildings category in 1974.

Other notable projects include two very bold sculptural bare concrete Brutalist designs, the YMCA in Suva, Fiji (1973), and the Canberra School of Music (1976, now Llewellyn Hall, ANU School of Music). The Music School was the first of many projects that followed in Canberra. Another landmark early brick Brutalist project was the City Edge Housing development (1971—1974) in South Melbourne, a set of multi-level apartments accessed via ramps and stairs along a pedestrian internal walkway, set above the carpark, which won the 1976 Bronze Medal (RAIA Housing Award). The State Bank College, also in rural Baxter (1977), used similar blocky forms but on a smaller scale and in concrete block, with residential units stepped in plan, and down the slope. In contrast to these Brutalist designs, the St Pauls School, Baxter (1974–1979), now Woodleigh School Senior campus, was a collection of timber structures in a bush setting.

In the 1970s Jackson designed a few residential projects in the rough-hewn unpainted timber type then gaining popularity. One was his own holiday house in Shoreham on the Mornington Peninsula, a design of many levels and layers, and another a house for the Abrahams family on the beachfront at Brighton (1979). Both designs featured the use of timber slat pergolas/verandahs providing shade.

Evan Walker left the firm in 1978 in order to pursue a political career, becoming Minister for Planning in the early 1980s.

=== Daryl Jackson Architecture ===
After 1980 the work of the firm took on new directions, including expressed steel structure for large-span projects, and a more eclectic approach to composition, influenced by the new trends of Postmodernism.

The Canberra School of Art (1981, now part of the ANU Institute of the Arts) introduced rounded and stepped planning. The pool for the new Australian Institute of Sport (1983) is a notable work from this period, featuring a white tubular trussed roof in stepped sections with arched skylight edges. Expressed steel structure also features in the steel canopy of the Great Southern Stand at the MCG (1992 designed in association with Tompkins Shaw & Evans), an approach used in other stadiums and sports halls. The firm was also commissioned for two major embassy commissions, the Singapore High Commission in Canberra (1985), and the Australian embassy in Riyadh, Saudi Arabia (1989), which features stylised references to local vernaculars.

A landmark work from this period was the Walter and Eliza Hall Institute of Research at the Royal Melbourne Hospital, completed in 1985.

By the later 1980s Jackson was so highly regarded that he won the annual National Royal Australian Institute of Architects Gold Medal in 1987, joining the ranks of high profile winners such of Robin Boyd and Harry Seidler.

The firm continued to grow, and undertook major commercial office projects, notably 120 Collins Street (with Hassell), completed in 1991. Featuring squared window openings, striped cladding and a stepped top, the steel spire atop the 52 floors made it the tallest in Australia for many years.

The firm also worked within a new regard for heritage that was developing in the 1980s. Early in that decade, Jackson renovated a very altered pair of 19th century terraces in east Melbourne into his own family home, with some stylised classical features and a steel trellis balcony. In Canberra, the firm restored and sympathetically extended the 1924 Hotel Canberra, re-opening in 1988.

About 1990 Jackson was awarded the major project to build the new Museum of Victoria on Southbank, in a design of angled forms, domes and stripes. This was only partially built, and later transformed into part of the Melbourne Exhibition Centre by the up and coming firm Denton Corker Marshall.

A major redevelopment of the MCG followed, with the Great Southern Stand (now the Shane Warne Stand) completed in 1992. Designed in association with Tompkins Shaw & Evans, who had done MCG stands previously, it features a dramatic expressed cantilevered steel structure supporting a continuous roof. This was followed by a similar design, but with a fabric roof, for the Northern Grandstand at 'the Gabba' in Brisbane, completed in 1997. That design was repeated in stages around the ground until in 2005 it encircled the whole oval. In 2006, Jackson returned as part of a consortium of five architects to design the Great Northern Stand for the other half of the MCG.

The firm also designed major health facilities, including new wings at the Royal Melbourne Hospital and the Austin Hospital, both in Melbourne.

Another project in a heritage context was the extension of the Sydney Conservatorium of Music, in association with the NSW Government Architect, completed in 2001. In a 'brilliant move', the new faculties were placed under grassed terraces around the existing Gothik style building, dating from 1841. With heritage consultants Allom Lovell, the firm also restored and renovated the historic Customs House in Melbourne to meet a new role as the Immigration Museum, opening in 1998.

The new County Court of Victoria on the corner of William and Lonsdale Streets was another award winning project, completed in 2002. Designed in association with Lyons, it features angular and folded geometries, and a dramatic cantilevered porch over the entrance.

=== Jackson Architecture ===
Since about 2000, the practice has been known as Jackson Architecture, and grown to be involved in numerous large scale projects. With branches in Melbourne, Sydney, Canberra, Brisbane, London, Vietnam, and China, the firm has completed university and college facilities, stadiums, commercial offices, art galleries, and industrial structures.

As the chief principal of design at Jackson Architecture, Jackson perceived his role relative to that of a film director: "working on the plot, lining up the cameras, producing and editing to generate the desired result". While Jackson unified each product with his direct design input, he placed a strong emphasis on collaborative design and idea thinking, and acknowledged the talent and co-professionalism of other designers that help piece together each project.

Major involvements with other architects included the Southern Cross Station redevelopment with Grimshaw Architects, completed in 2006, and the Great Northern Stand of the MCG as part of a consortium of five practices. Jackson's Sydney practice, Daryl Jackson Robin Dyke Pty Ltd, was the Executive Architect for the Frank Gehry-designed The Dr Chau Chak Wing Building for the University of Technology, Sydney (UTS), which was completed in 2015.

Other notable works mentioned on the practice website in 2026 include:

=== Education projects ===
- Ivanhoe Girls' Grammar School Resource Centre
- Redevelopment of the University of Ballarat
- Redevelopment of the Wesley College – St. Kilda Road Campus Junior School (formerly known as the Preparatory School)
- Swinburne University Graduate School of Business
- The Snow Centre for Education in the Asian Century, Canberra Grammar School
- University of Queensland Bioscience Precinct, University of Queensland
- Victoria University City Campus Tower, Melbourne
- University of Canterbury Canterbury Engineering the Future (CETF), University of Canterbury
- University of Canterbury Gateway Building, Victoria University of Wellington, Wellington, New Zealand
- James Cook University Australian Institute of Tropical Health and Medicine Townsville, QLD

=== Residential projects ===
- Wuxi Housing Development, China
- Elliston Estate, Rosanna
- College Square Student Housing, Carlton
- Fitzroy Apartments, Fitzroy

=== Health and research ===
- Olivia Newton-John Cancer and Wellness Centre, Austin Hospital
- Royal Prince Alfred Hospital redevelopment
- Royal Brisbane and Women's Hospital redevelopment
- Royal Melbourne Hospital redevelopment
- Prince of Wales Hospital redevelopment
- Royal Australasian College of Surgeons redevelopment
- CSIRO Discovery Centre
- Box Hill Hospital
- Australian Nursing and Midwifery Federation

=== Sport and recreation ===
- Telstra Dome with Populous
- Melbourne Cricket Ground Northern Stand
- Frankston Arts Centre
- Melbourne Park Eastern Plaza
- Maribyrnong, Victoria Maribyrnong Aquatic Centre
- Essendon Football Club High Performance Facility
- Royal Melbourne Tennis Club

=== Commercial and retail ===
- 480 Lonsdale Street, Melbourne
- European Serviced Offices, Budapest
- Australian Greenhouse Office, Canberra
- Brindabella Business Park, Canberra
- Canberra Centre, Canberra

=== Government ===
- Attorney General's Department Canberra
- West Australian Police Academy
- Impulse Airlines hangar at Canberra Airport
- Capital Jet Facility at Canberra Airport

=== Master-planning ===
- Bond University
- Griffith University
- University of Melbourne
- Canberra Grammar School
- Carlton Housing Redevelopment

== Other activities ==
Jackson taught architecture at RMIT, and wrote a regular column on housing for The Age from 1966 to 1999. Jackson was also a principal lecturer at Royal Australian Institute of Architects (RAIA) conventions and a visiting professor of architecture and design at the University of New South Wales in 1982.

Other roles included at different times serving as chairman of the Australian Film Institute, Trustee of the National Gallery of Victoria, member of the Victoria Council of the Arts, Vice President of the Melbourne Cricket Club, director of the Essendon Football Club, president of Wesley College (Victoria), and chair of the Heritage Council of Victoria.

Jackson has published three books on his practice : Daryl Jackson, architecture, drawings and photographs, Macmillan, South Melbourne, 1984; Daryl Jackson: selected and current works, Images Publishing, Mulgrave, Vic., 1996; and Evolutionary modernism: Daryl Jackson, Melbourne University Publishing, 2006.

== Personal life ==
Daryl Jackson married Kay in 1961, and had four children, two of whom are also architects. Sara Jackson worked worked in her father's office in the 1990s, and since 2013 has been a Director. Tim Jackson is also an architect, and in 1998 was a founding partner of Jackson, Clements, Burroughs, known as JCB Architects.

== Death ==
Jackson died on 21 February 2026, at the age of 89.

== Recognition ==
- 1987 – Royal Australian Institute of Architects Gold Medal
- 1990 – Appointed an Officer of the Order of Australia on 26 January 1990 for his service to architecture
- 2015 – A national Australian Institute of Architects Award for educational buildings was established and named the Daryl Jackson Award for Educational Architecture.

== Awards ==
Jackson Walker

Largely taken from the book Evolutionary modernism: Daryl Jackson, Melbourne University Publishing, 2006.

- 1969 – RAIA (Victorian Chapter) Citation for Harold Holt Memorial Swimming Centre with Kevin Borland
- 1970 – RAIA (Victorian Chapter) Bronze Medal for Lauriston Girls School Special Studies Building
- 1973 – RAIA (Victorian Chapter) Bronze Medal for Princes Hill High School
- 1974 – RAIA (Victorian Chapter) Citation for RAW Woodgate Resource Centre, MLC
- 1976 – RAIA (Victorian Chapter) Bronze Medal for City Edge Housing
- 1976 – RAIA (Victorian Chapter) Citation for Boyle House, Mornington
- 1976 – RAIA (Victorian Chapter) Citation for St Pauls School, Woodleigh
- 1976 – RAIA (Victorian Chapter) Citation for Yooralla Special Day School, Glenroy
- 1976 – RAIA (Victorian Chapter) Citation for South Drummond Street Conservation Study, Carlton
- 1977 – RAIA (ACT Chapter) Merit Award for Canberra School of Music
- 1978 – RAIA (ACT Chapter) Merit Award for ANU Canberra School of Music (Llewellyn Hall)
- 1978 – RAIA (Victorian Chapter) Bronze Medal for State Bank College, Baxter
- 1978 – RAIA (Victorian Chapter) Citation for Collingwood Swimming Pool (demolished)
- 1979 – RAIA (ACT Chapter) Award for Canberra School of Art
- 1979 – RAIA (Victorian Chapter) Citation for Royal Melbourne Hospital Staff Housing
- 1979 – Citation in Library Design Awards for Balwyn Library, Melbourne.
- 1981 – Inaugural Sir Zelman Cowen Award for Public Architecture for Canberra School of Art (now Llewellyn Hall, ANU School of Music)
- 2026 – Sir Roy Grounds Award for Enduring Architecture for ANU Music School, Canberra

Daryl Jackson

- 1982 – RAIA (Victorian Chapter) Robert Haddon Award for Abrahams House, Brighton, Victoria
- 1982 – RAIA (ACT Chapter) Merit Award for McLachlan Offices, Canberra (demolished).
- 1983 – RAIA (NSW Chapter) Merit Award for Hampden Court Apartments, North Sydney
- 1984 – RAIA (National) Sir Zelman Cowen Award for Public Architecture for AIS National Sports Centre Swimming Halls, Canberra
- 1984 – RAIA (ACT Chapter) Canberra Medallion for AIS National Sports Centre Swimming Halls, Canberra
- 1985 – RAIA (ACT Chapter) Canberra Medallion for Singapore High Commission Chancery, Canberra
- 1985 – RAIA (National) President's Award for Espirit de Corps offices, Trenerry Crescent, Collingwood, Melbourne
- 1987 – RAIA (ACT Chapter) Canberra Medallion for Australian Defence Force Academy Indoor Sports Hall, Canberra
- 1987 – RAIA (WA Chapter) Design Award for Superdrome (now Perth High Performance Centre), Mount Claremont, Perth, with Peter Hunt
- 1988 – RAIA (ACT Chapter) Merit Award for Lake Ginninderra College, Canberra
- 1989 – RAIA (National) President's Award for the Hyatt Hotel, Canberra
- 1989 – RAIA (NSW Chapter) Merit Award for the Australian Film Television and Radio School, North Ryde, NSW
- 1991 – RAIA (National) International Architecture Award for Australian Chancery Complex in Riyadh, Saudi Arabia
- 1991 – RAIA (ACT Chapter) Canberra Medallion for Australian Institute of Sport Grandstand, Canberra
- 1992 – RAIA (National) Sir Zelman Cowen Award for Public Architecture for MCG Great Southern Stand, Melbourne, in association with Tompkins Shaw & Evans
- 1992 – RAIA (Victorian Chapter) Victorian Architecture Medal for MCG Great Southern Stand, Melbourne, in association with Tompkins Shaw & Evans
- 1992 – RAIA (Queensland Chapter) FDG Stanley Award Finalist for South Brisbane College of TAFE Food Technology Building, Brisbane
- 1992 – RAIA (ACT Chapter) Canberra Medallion for University of Canberra Boiler House Lecture Theatre
- 1992 – RAIA (Victorian Chapter) Award Winner for 120 Collins Street, Melbourne, in association with Hassell Architects
- 1994 – RAIA (WA Chapter) Merit Award for Department of Lands Administration Offices, Midland, Perth
- 1997 – RAIA (ACT Chapter) Canberra Medallion for Australian Institute of Sport Visitors Centre
- 1997 – RAIA (Queensland Chapter) Civic Design Award for Capalaba Town Centre Urban Works
- 1997 – RAIA (Queensland Chapter) FDG Stanley Award Commendation for the Northern Grandstand, Brisbane Cricket Ground
- 1998 – RAIA (Victorian Chapter) Melbourne Prize and national Interior Architecture Award for Georges Store redevelopment, Melbourne, in association with Conran Design Partnership
- 1998 – RAIA (Queensland Chapter) Civic Design Award for Cleveland Library and Administrative Centre, Cleveland, Qld
- 1998 – RAIA (Queensland Chapter) Environment Award and Regional Commendation for University of the Sunshine Coast Science Faculty, Qld
- 1998 – RAIA (Victorian Chapter) Urban Design Merit Award Crown Entertainment Complex Riverside Promenade, Melbourne, with Bates Smart and Perrott Lyon Mathieson
- 1999 – RAIA (ACT Chapter) Canberra Medallion for Capital Air Jet Facility, Canberra
- 1999 – RAIA (Queensland Chapter) Beatrice Hutton Award and Regional Commendation for Couran Cove Resort, Stradbroke Island, Qld
- 1999 – RAIA (National) President's Award for Recycled Buildings for Immigration Museum, Melbourne
- 1999 – RAIA (Victorian Chapter) City of Melbourne Prize and Conservation Award for the Immigration Museum, Melbourne
- 1999 – RAIA (NSW Chapter) Award for DOFA Administrative Building Refurbishment
- 1999 – RAIA (Tasmanian Chapter) Public Building Award for Port Arthur Historic Site Visitor Centre, with Philp Lighton

Jackson Architecture

- 2000 – RAIA (ACT Chapter) Canberra Medallion for CSIRO Discovery Centre
- 2000 – RAIA (WA Chapter) Design Award for Council House Refurbishment, with Peter Hunt
- 2001 – RAIA (WA Chapter) Design Award for Subiaco Oval Redevelopment with Peter Hunt. (demolished 2019)
- 2002 – RAIA (WA Chapter) Public Architecture Award for Western Australia Police Academy, Joondaloop, Perth.
- 2002 – RAIA (NSW) Public Building Award for the Sydney Conservatorium of Music extensions, Sydney
- 2003 – RAIA (Victorian Chapter) Interior Architecture Award for the County Court of Victoria, Melbourne, with Lyons and Sinclair Knight Merz
- 2004 – RAIA (Queensland Chapter) Gold Coast Region Building of the Year for Nerang Library
- 2010 – RAIA (WA Chapter) Public Architecture Award and Regional Commendation for the WA Basketball Centre (AK Reserve), Perth, in association with Peter Hunt Architects JV
- 2010 – RAIA (WA Chapter) Colourbond Award for Steel Architecture and RAIA Regional Commendation for the WA Basketball Centre, Perth, in association with Peter Hunt Architects JV
- 2010 – Master Builders (WA) Excellence in Construction Award, Best State Government Building Commendation for the WA Basketball Centre (AK Reserve), Perth, in association with Peter Hunt Architects JV
- 2010 – Master Builders (VIC) Excellence in Construction Award, Excellence in Commercial Buildings $10M-$15M for the Commendation VIC Ivanhoe Girls' Grammar School, Melbourne
- 2010 – Western Australian Heritage Award for the WA Police Midland Operations Support Facility, Perth, in association with Peter Hunt Architects JV
- 2012 – Sir Roy Grounds Award for Enduring Architecture for AIS National Sports Centre Swimming Halls, Canberra
- 2013 – Master Builders (Victoria) Excellence in Construction of Commercial Building for the Olivia Newton-John Cancer and Wellness Centre, Melbourne in association with McConnel Smith Johnson
- 2014 – Master Builders (Victoria) Excellence in Commercial Construction, for Melbourne Park Eastern Precinct Redevelopment
- 2020 – AIA (Victorian Chapter) Maggie Edmond Enduring Architecture Award for the MCG Great Southern Stand, Melbourne, in association with Tompkins Shaw and Evans

== Gallery ==
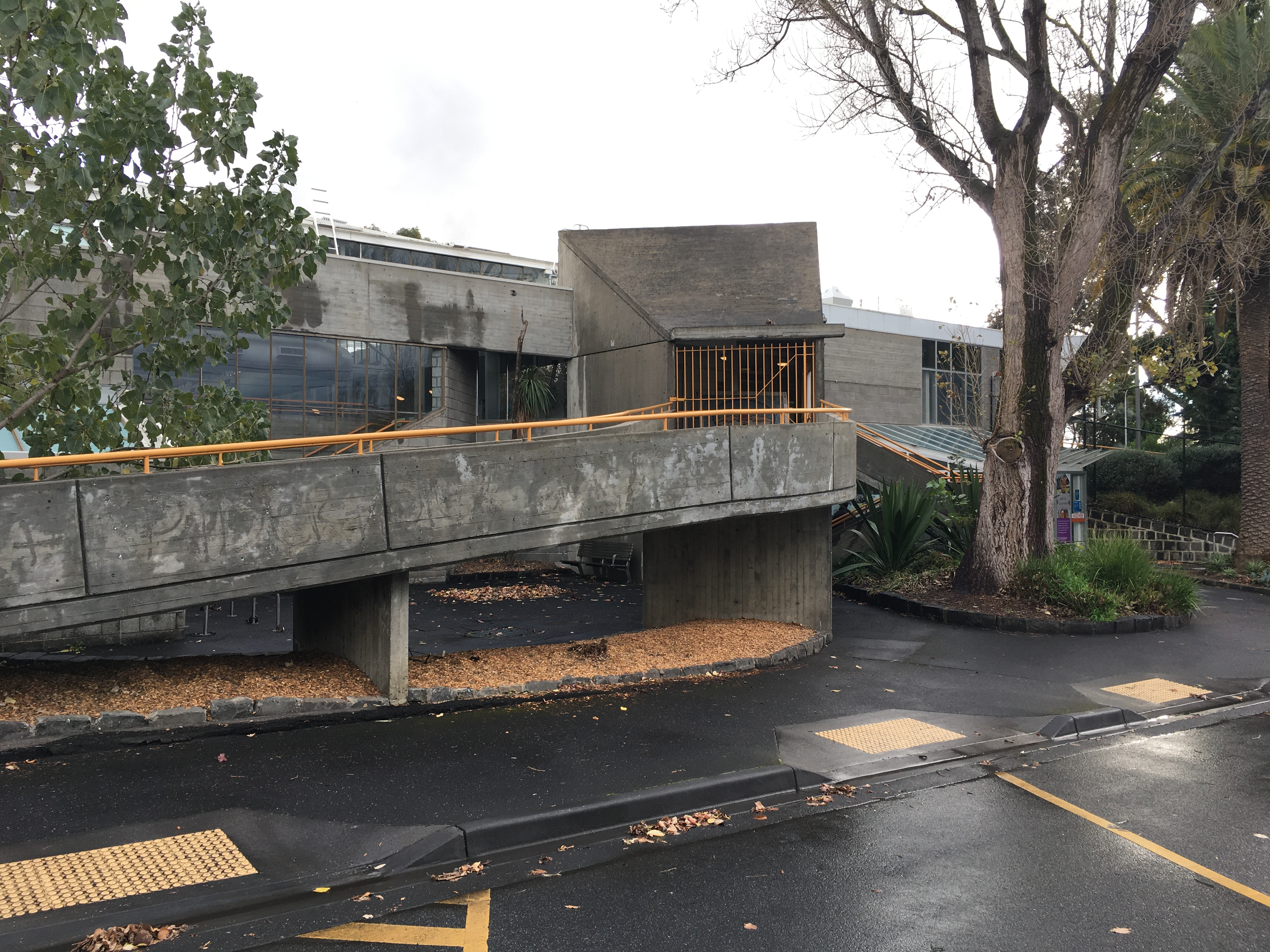
Harold Holt Pool 1969

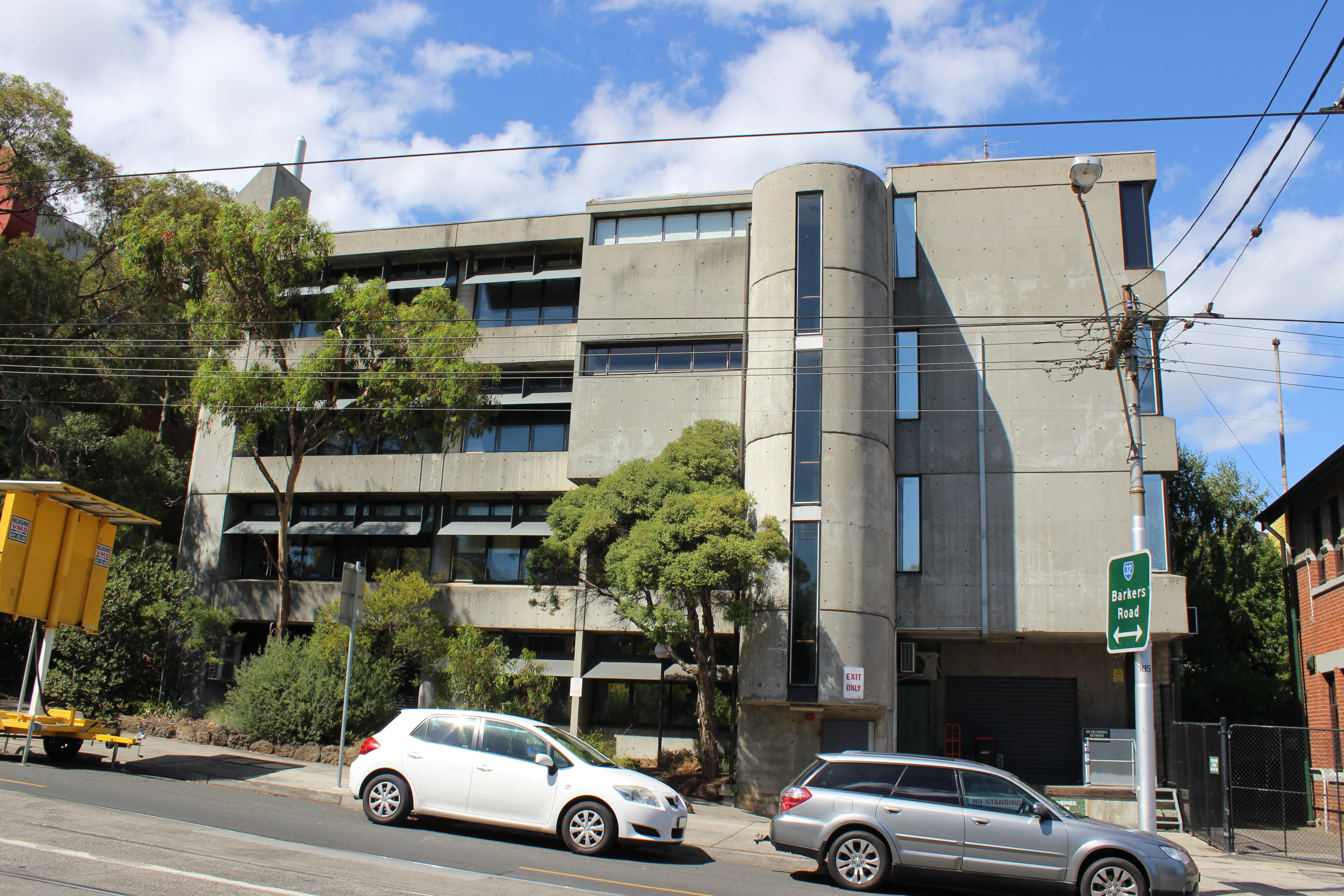
RAW Woodgate Centre, MLC, 1973

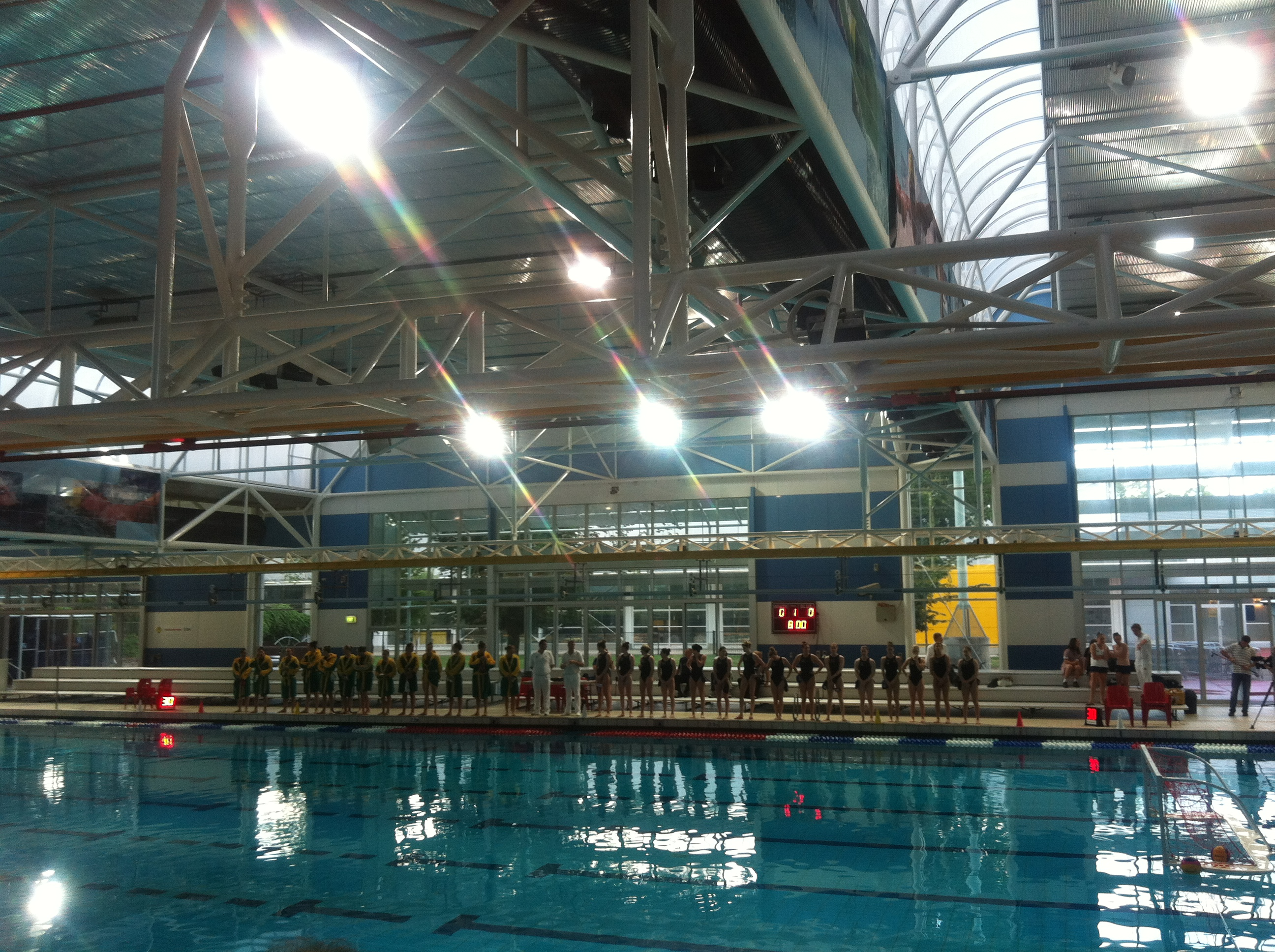
Australian Institute of Sport pool, 1983

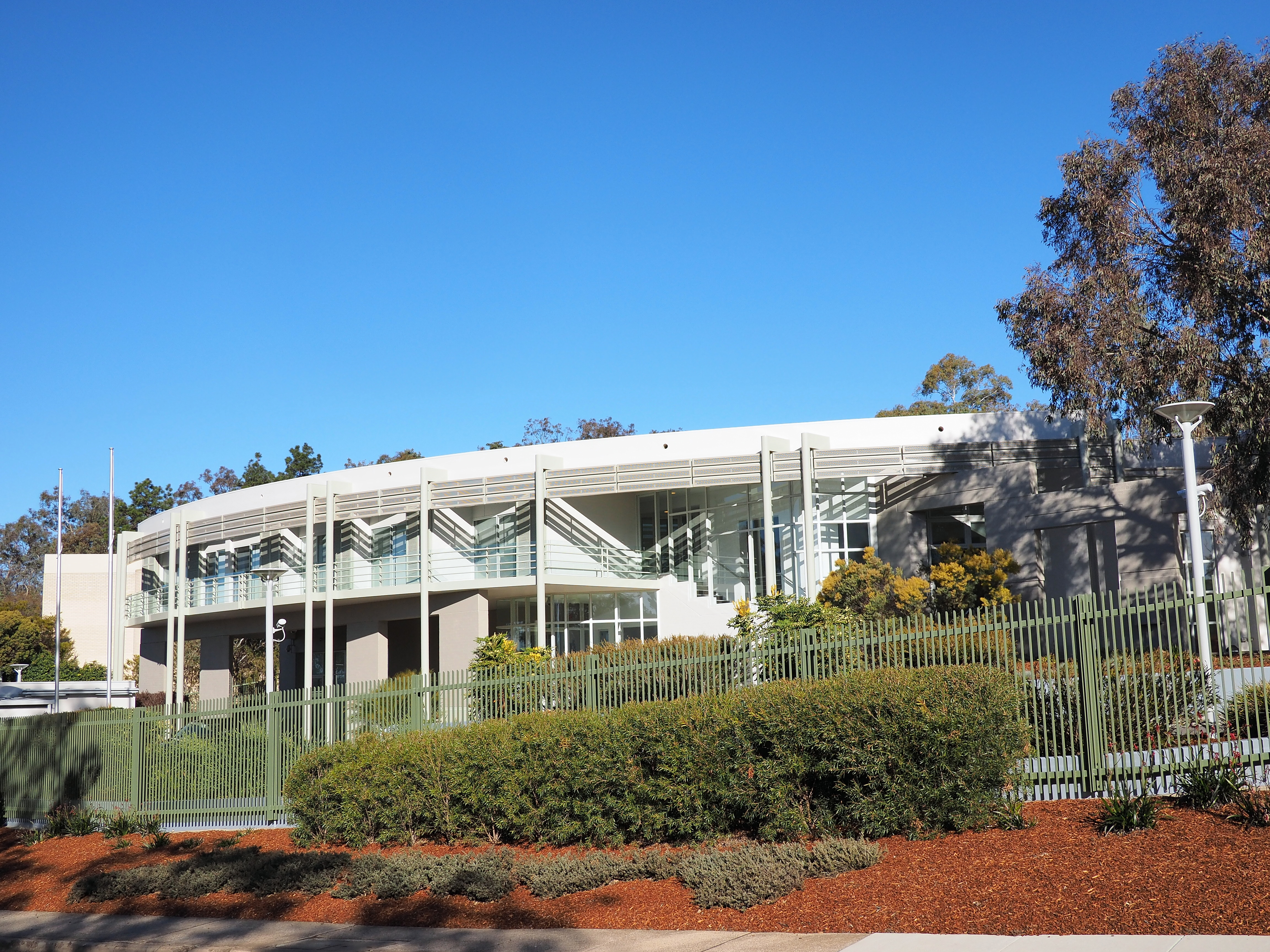
High Commission of Singapore, Canberra, 1985.

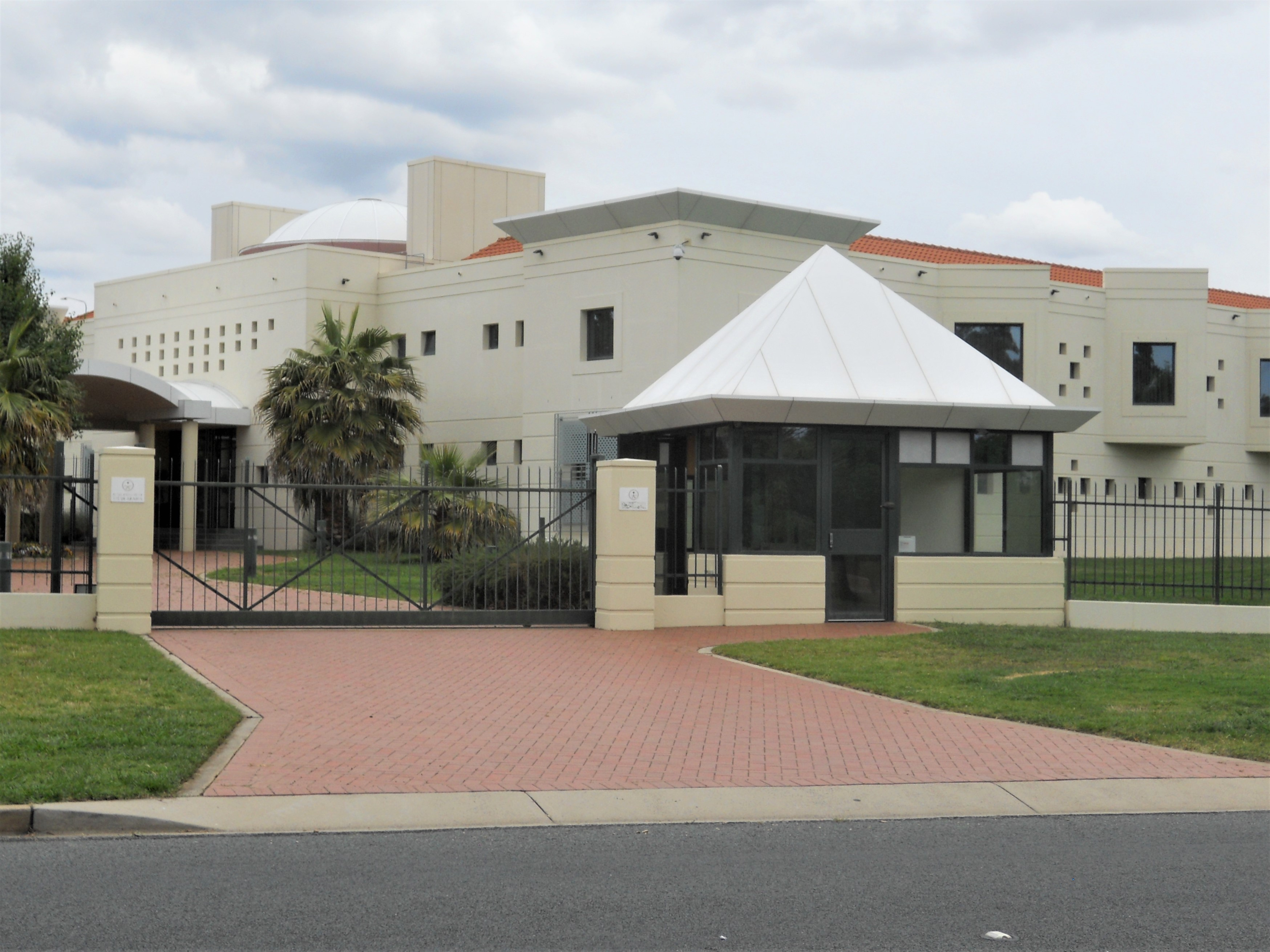
Australian Embassy, Riyadh, 1989

Hyatt Hotel, 1988 rear facade

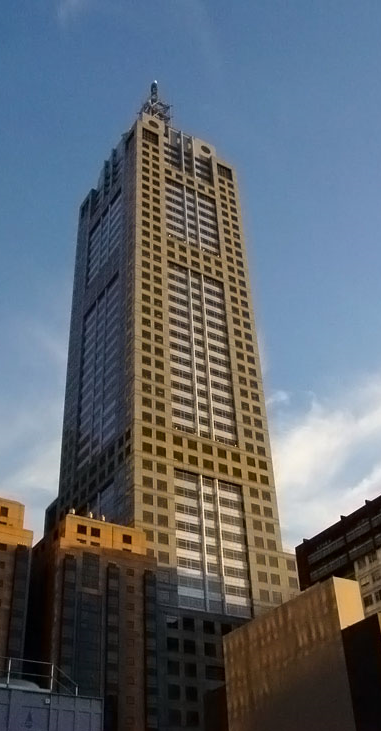
120 Collins Street, 1991

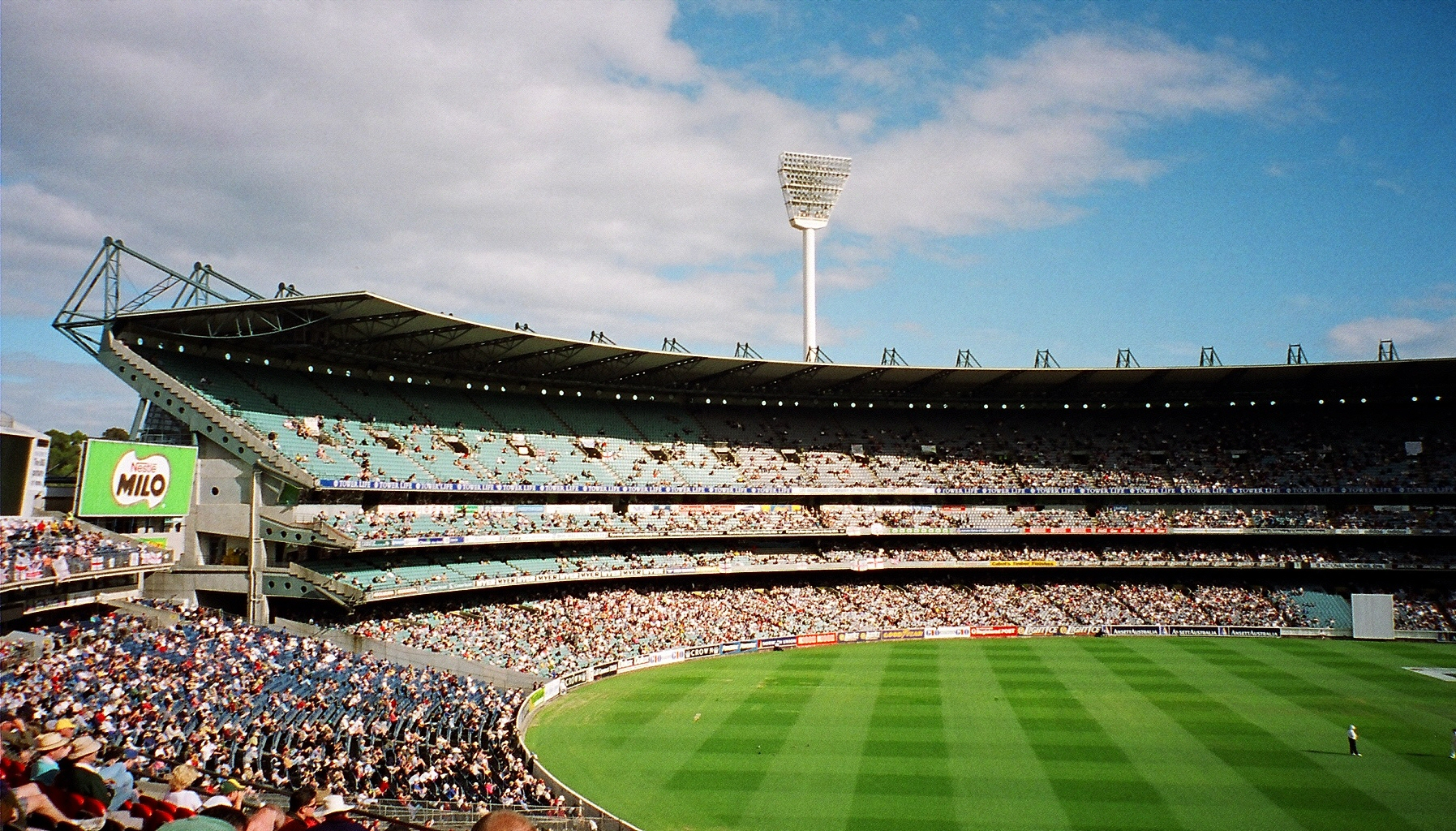
Great Southern Stand in 1998

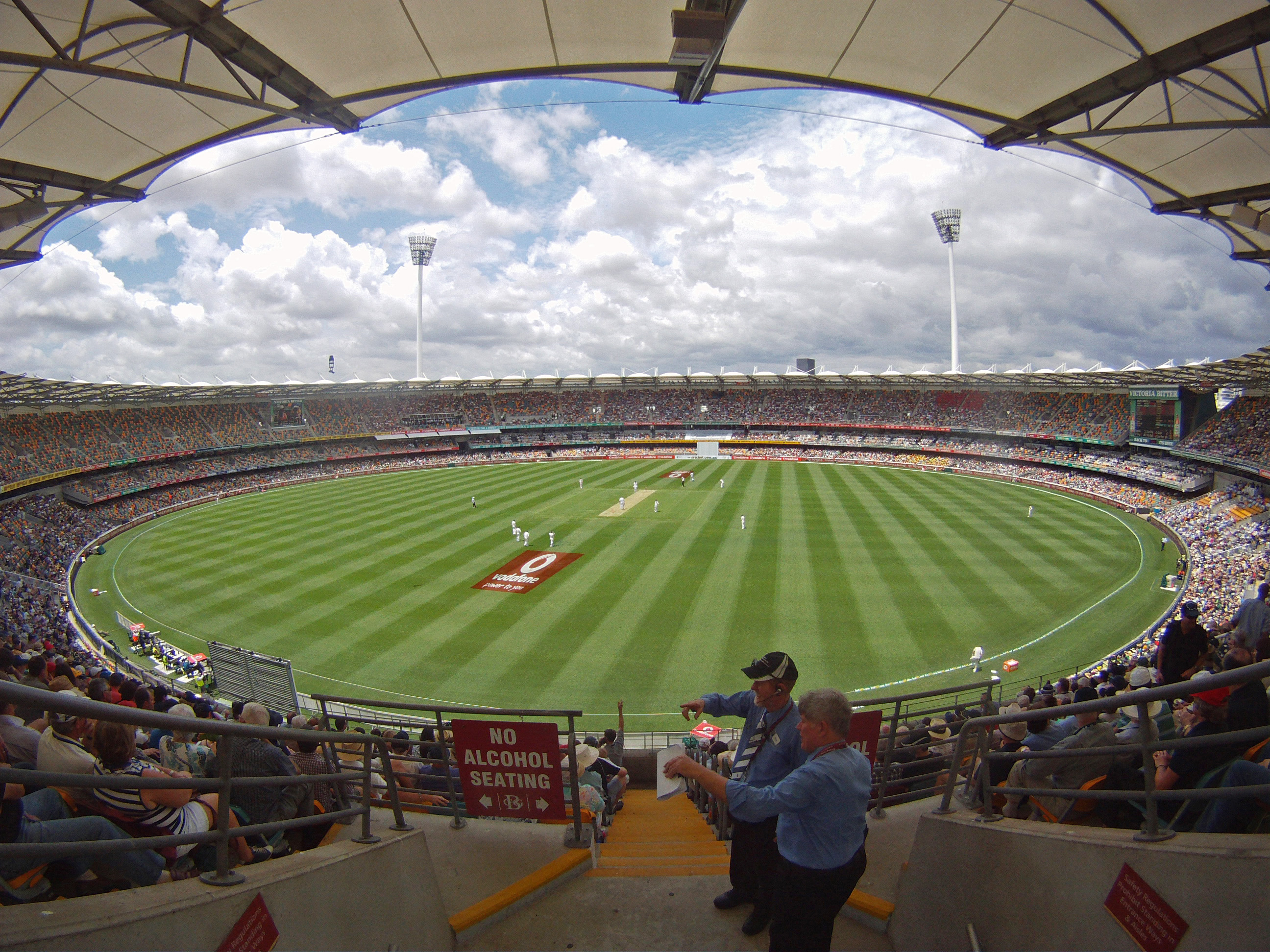
The Gabba 1997-2006

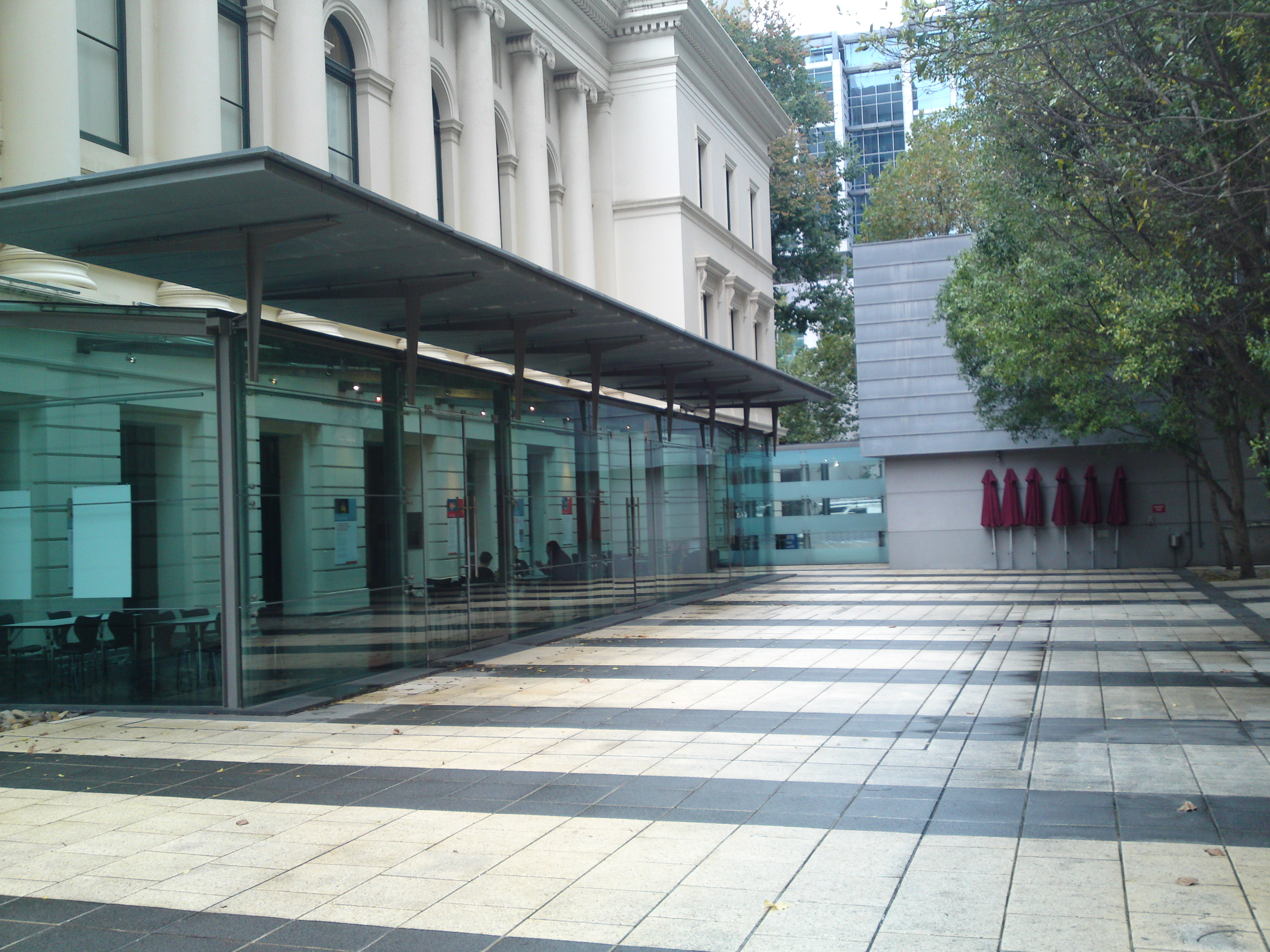
Immigration Museum, 1998

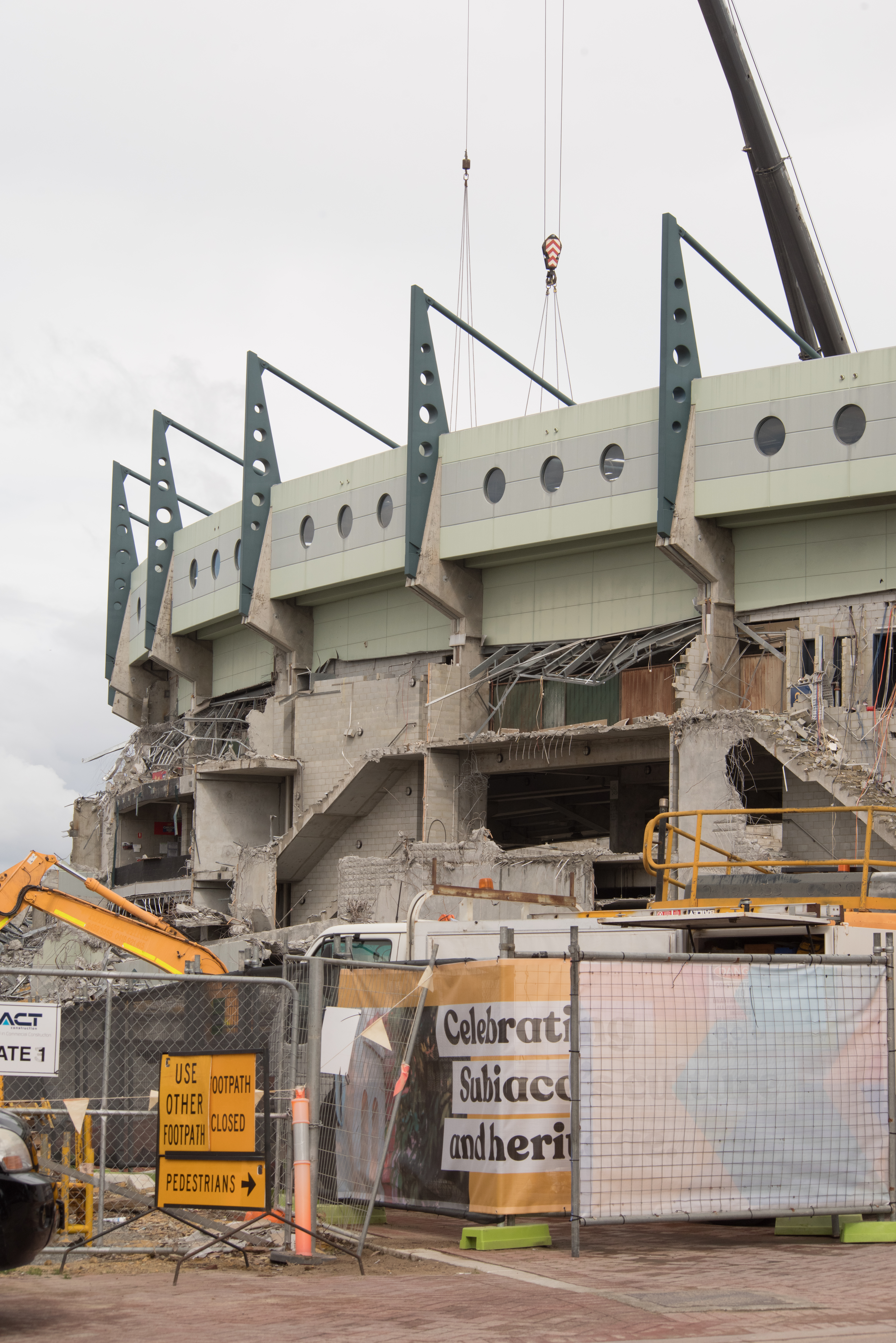
Subiaco Oval 2001 demolition 2019

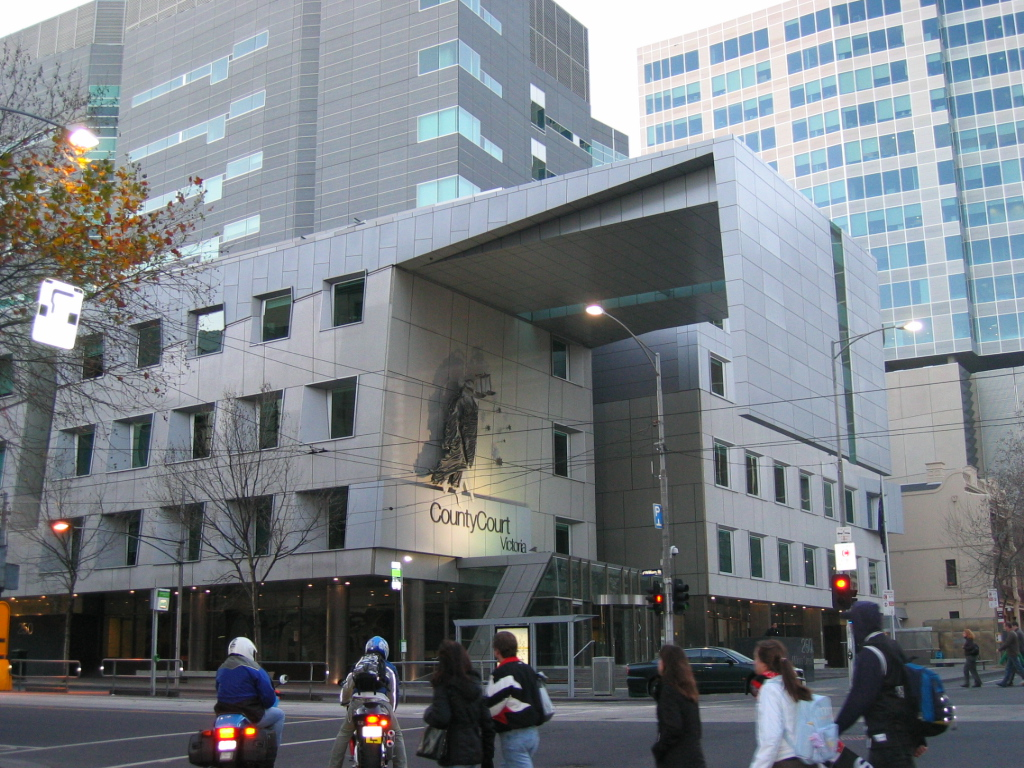
County Court of Victoria, 2006

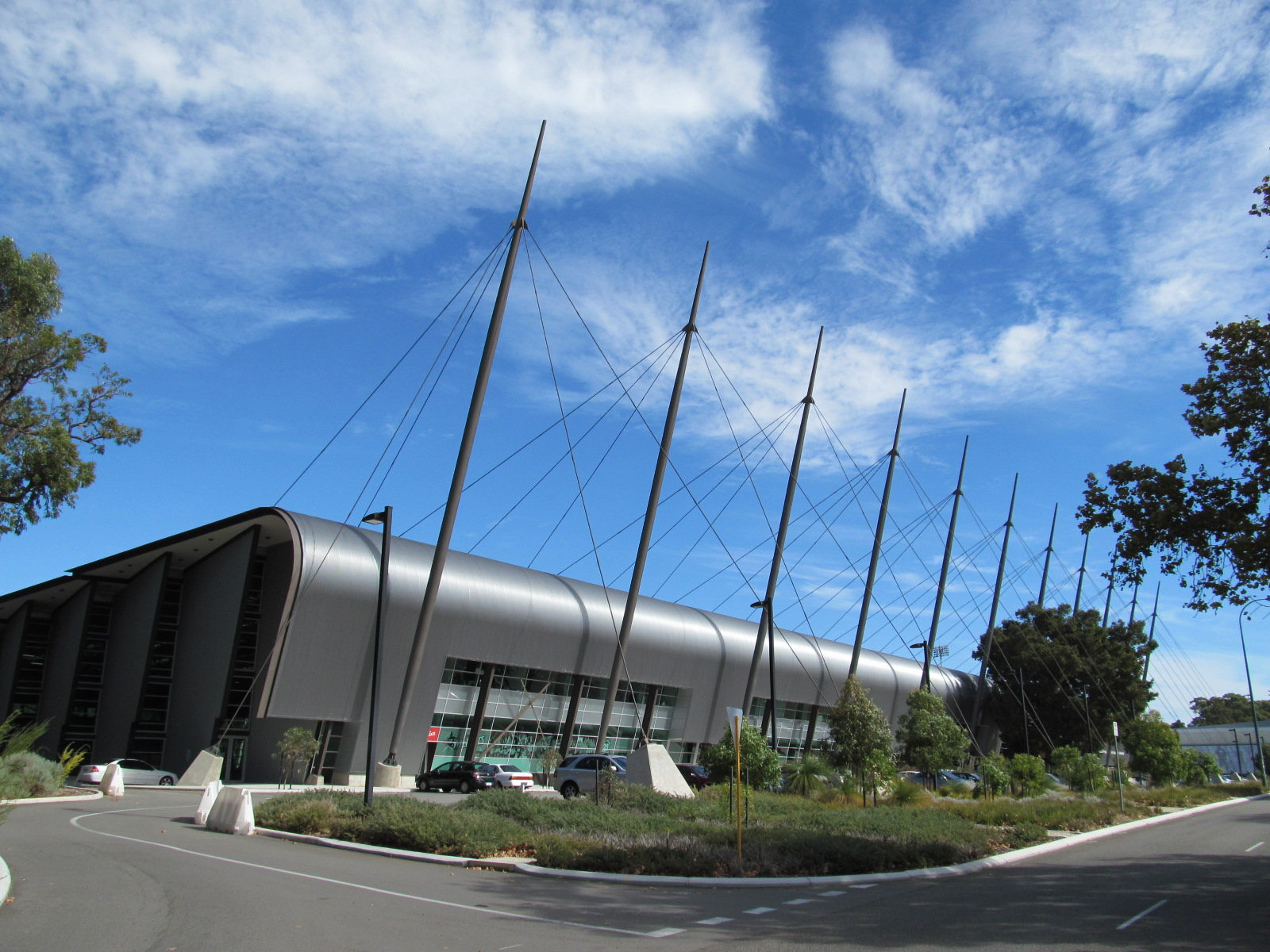
WA Basketball Centre, 2009
