= Harold Holt Memorial Swimming Centre =

Swimming pool complex in Melbourne, Australia

Coordinates: 37°51′31″S 145°02′41″E

Harold Holt Swim Centre
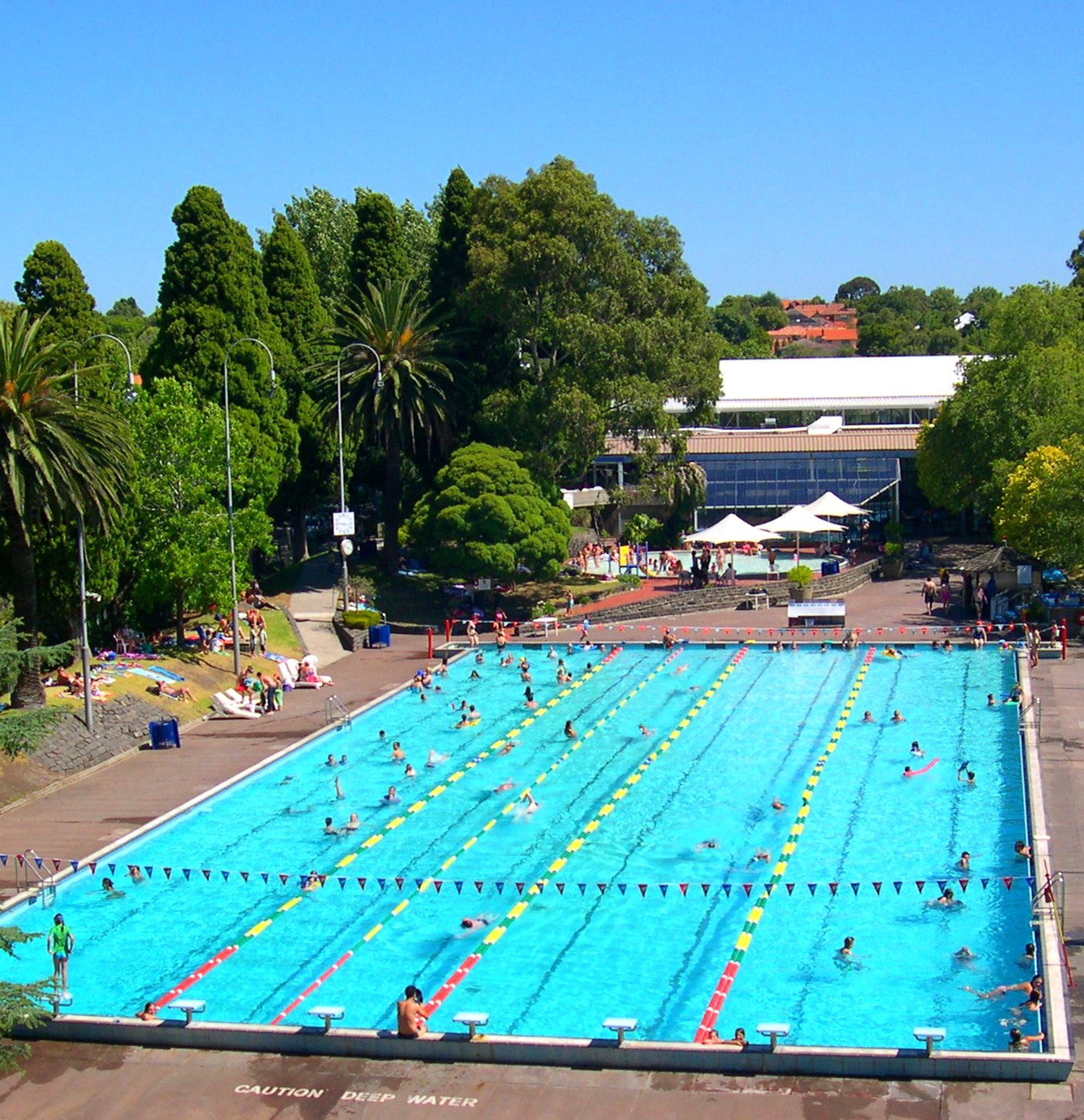
- Main pool of the Harold Holt Swim Centre
- Interactive map of Harold Holt Swim Centre
- Full name: Harold Holt Memorial Swimming Centre
- Address: Glen Iris

Construction
- Opened: 27 November 1927 and 16 March 1969
- Cost: £10,476 (1927) $600,000 (1969) $13 million redevelopment (2010)
- Architects: Kevin Borland & Daryl Jackson

The Harold Holt Memorial Swimming Centre is a public swimming pool complex located on the corner of High Street and Edgar Street, Glen Iris, Melbourne, Australia. Built in the 1960s by Australian architects Kevin Borland and Daryl Jackson, the Swimming Centre is considered to be a fine example of Brutalist architecture. Originally built in 1927 as a municipal swimming baths, the facilities were renovated in 1967 by Borland and Jackson to accommodate for higher swimming participation numbers. It is named in honour of Prime Minister Harold Holt, the local member of parliament (representing the Division of Higgins) until his apparent drowning death while the facility was under construction.

== Malvern Baths ==
In 1924 the Malvern City Council voted to build the suburb's first municipal baths. The Education Department, who envisaged the implementation of the 'learn to swim' campaign, strongly supported the proposed location, a redundant tip site, on the corner of High Street and Edgar Street. Built at a cost of £10,476, the Malvern Baths was designed by the City Engineer, Barton Coutie. The baths included a wedge shaped pool and bathing boxes, and was designed using ideas gleaned from Coutie's examination of swimming pools in Harrow, London. The complex was officially opened by the Mayor Harry Wilmot in November 1927.

== New 'Swimming Centre' ==
In 1966 the Malvern Council commissioned architects Kevin Borland and Daryl Jackson to design a new swimming complex, as the Municipal Baths had become declared 'inadequate and outmoded' by the early 1960s. Set to be named the City of Malvern Olympic Swimming Centre, the name was changed after the apparent drowning death of Malvern's local member and Prime Minister of Australia Harold Holt in December 1967. The name is cited as a "perhaps unintentional" example of Australian black humour. The centre was opened by prime minister and new local member John Gorton in March 1969. The new complex cost $600,000.

In 1988 the centre underwent a renovation with the additions of a hydrotherapy pool, spa, sauna and multi-purpose room for aerobics and yoga classes. Further works were undertaken in 1998 to improve pool operations and an upgrade of the filtration systems.

2010 saw a $13 million redevelopment of the centre, expanding its new health and fitness facilities as well as its Aquatic areas. The Harold Holt Swim Centre has become one of Melbourne's most popular aquatic facilities with 400,000 visitors per year.

== Architecture ==
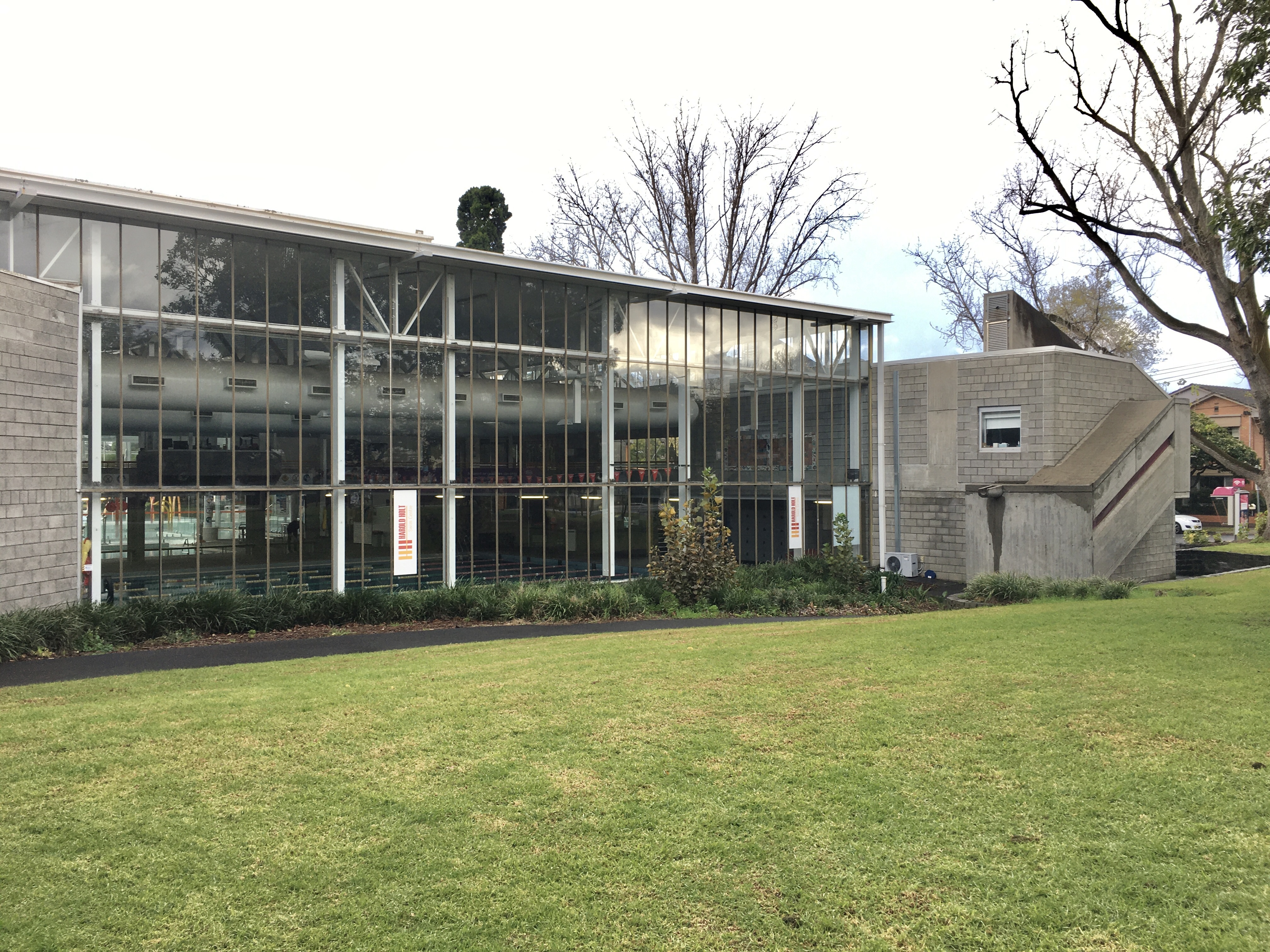
Harold Holt Memorial Swimming Centre south face

The Harold Holt Memorial Swimming Centre is considered to be among the most notable examples of Brutalist architecture. It is classified by the National Trust and is listed on the Victorian Heritage Register.

=== Influences ===
The Harold Holt swim centre is categorized as a brutalist building by Stuart Harrison in the journal Architect Victoria, Summer 2003. Harrison talks about the complexity of the centre's siting that echoes contemporary interests far advanced for its time in the 1960s. He goes on to discuss the building as a merger between different architectural styles that create a factory like feel within a suburban area much like Edmond and Corrigan's 1978 St Joseph's Chapel, Box Hill, Victoria, Australia. Harrison believes that the Harold Holt centre's sophistication could be read beyond its stylistic categorization as Brutalist, relating the sports function of the building to ancient gladiators: "Is it possible that Brutalism's usage for sports buildings is related to some sense of appropriateness to function? Sports as brutal, gladiatorial?"

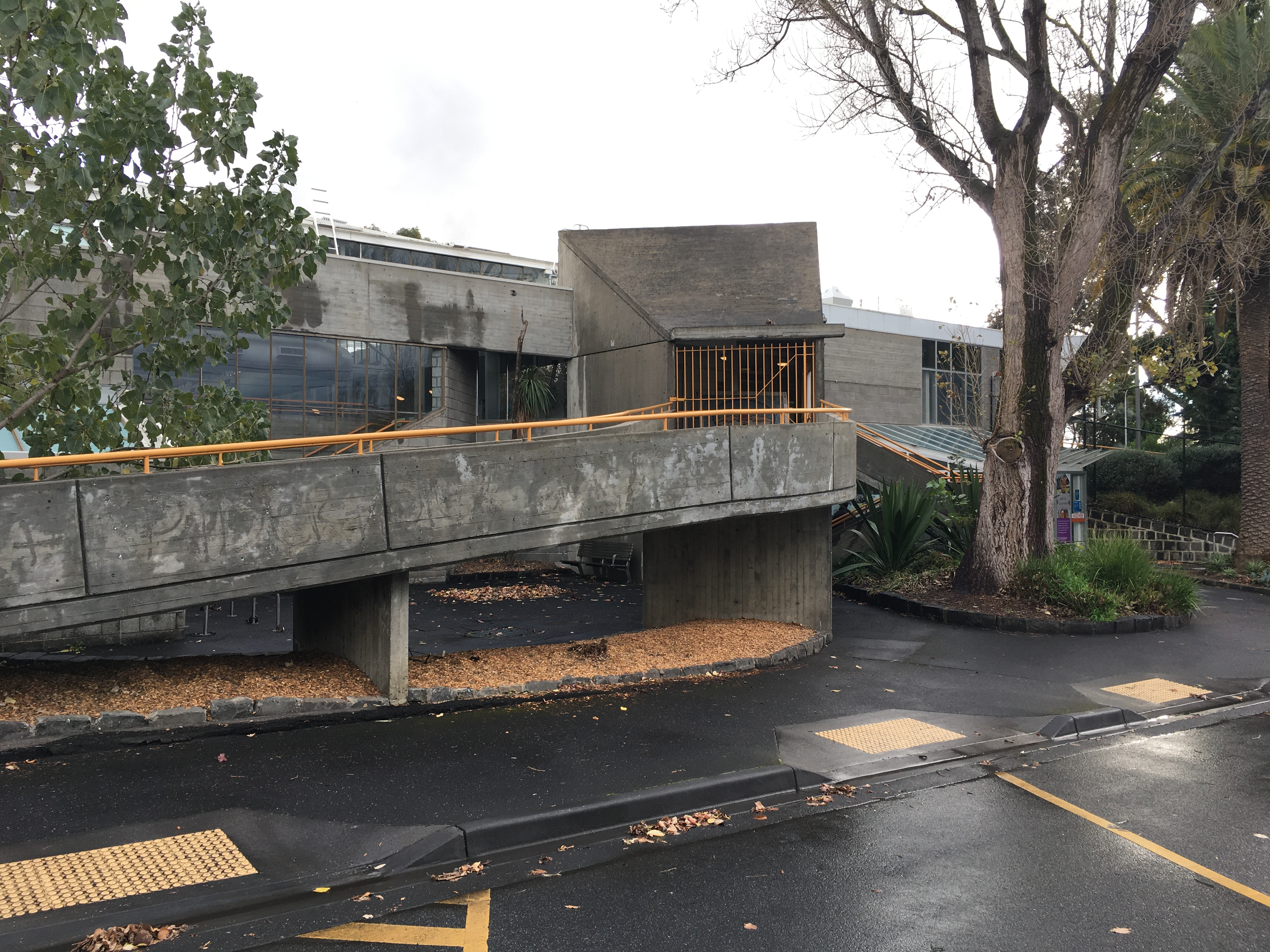
Harold Holt Memorial Swimming Pool original entry and ramp

=== Facilities ===
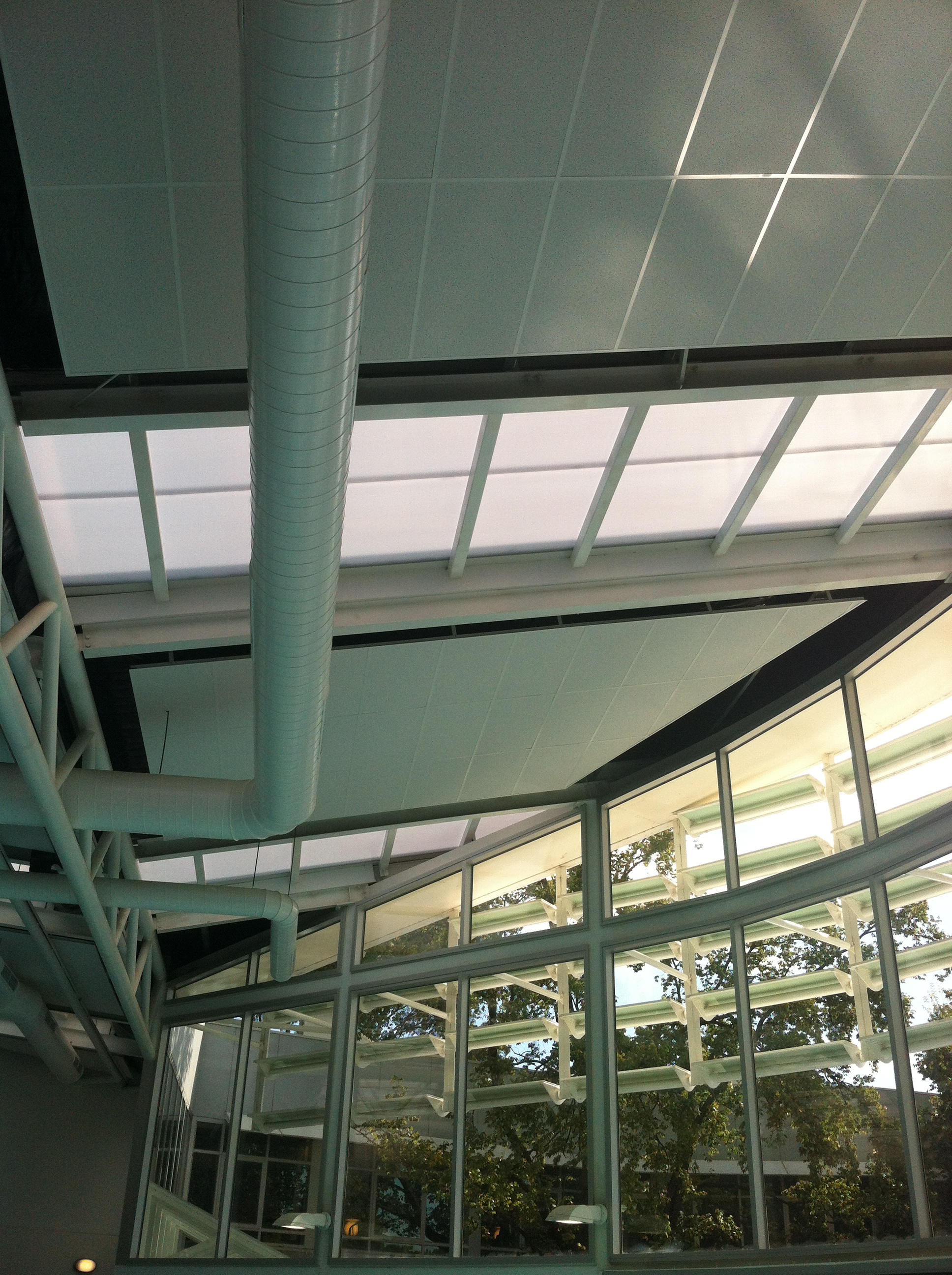
Inside the Harold Holt Memorial Swimming Centre

The Harold Holt Swimming Centre sits on a site of approximately 207 x 57 metres and consists of several pools with varying functionality and use. The indoor training pool and learner's pool are setback 40 metres from the south end of the site. There is a terrace located just north of these pools, a change rooms located to the west of the pools and a kiosk located east of these pools. Wedged between pathways that run along the perimeter of the site is a wading pool beyond which is the main pool that is approximately 49 × 14 metres in size. The centre also features a circular diving pool at the northern edge of the site.

The complex consists of five pools, including an Outdoor 50m pool and an Indoor 25m pool enclosed by a large glass walled building. The outdoor pool became the first heated pool in Victoria for year-round swimming. It was also the first pool in Australia designed to metric standards. The complex also houses a hydrotherapy pool, spa, sauna and multi-purpose room for aerobics and yoga classes, which were additions in 1988. In 1998 further works were undertaken to improve pool operations, including an indoor pool 'wet deck' and upgrade of the filtration systems.

In November 2010 the Harold Holt Swim Centre underwent a $13 million redevelopment phase. The centre now features new facilities such as the health club and three fitness studios hosting over 50 fitness classes per week. Aquatic areas were expanded to include a leisure pool with water features and learn to swim pool. The Harold Holt Swim Centre also has child care facilities.

- Reception – located on the ground floor, enter via Edgar Street
- Outdoor 50m pool
- Indoor 25m pool
- Studio 1 – fitness classes
- Learners' pool – learn to swim lessons
- Leisure pool – fun aquatic play with water features
- Indoor toddlers' pool
- Hydrotherapy pool – in water ramp
- Accessible change rooms (located next to the hydro pool)
- Indoor female and male change rooms
- Sauna (indoor spa opening soon)

== Tram Stop ==
Harold Holt Swim Centre

General information
- Location: Glen Iris, Melbourne, Victoria
- Owner: VicTrack
- Operator: Yarra Trams
- Platforms: 2
- Tracks: 2
- Connections: none

Construction
- Structure type: Below-grade

Other information
- Status: Open
- Station code: 49
- Fare zone: Myki zone 1

History
- Opened: 25 March 1914

Services
Preceding station	Yarra Trams	Following station
Tooronga Road towards Moreland	Route 6	Belmont Avenue towards Glen Iris
Location

The centre is served by a tram stop with the same name, which is located approximately 50 metres away on High Street.

Yarra Trams operates one route via Harold Holt Swim Centre:

- : Moreland – Glen Iris

== Awards ==
- RAIA Victorian Chapter, Citation in the Public Buildings category, 1969. Harold Holt Memorial Swimming Centre, Glen Iris (1968–69).

== See also ==
- List of sports venues named after individuals
