= Nichols House, Eltham =

Nichols House
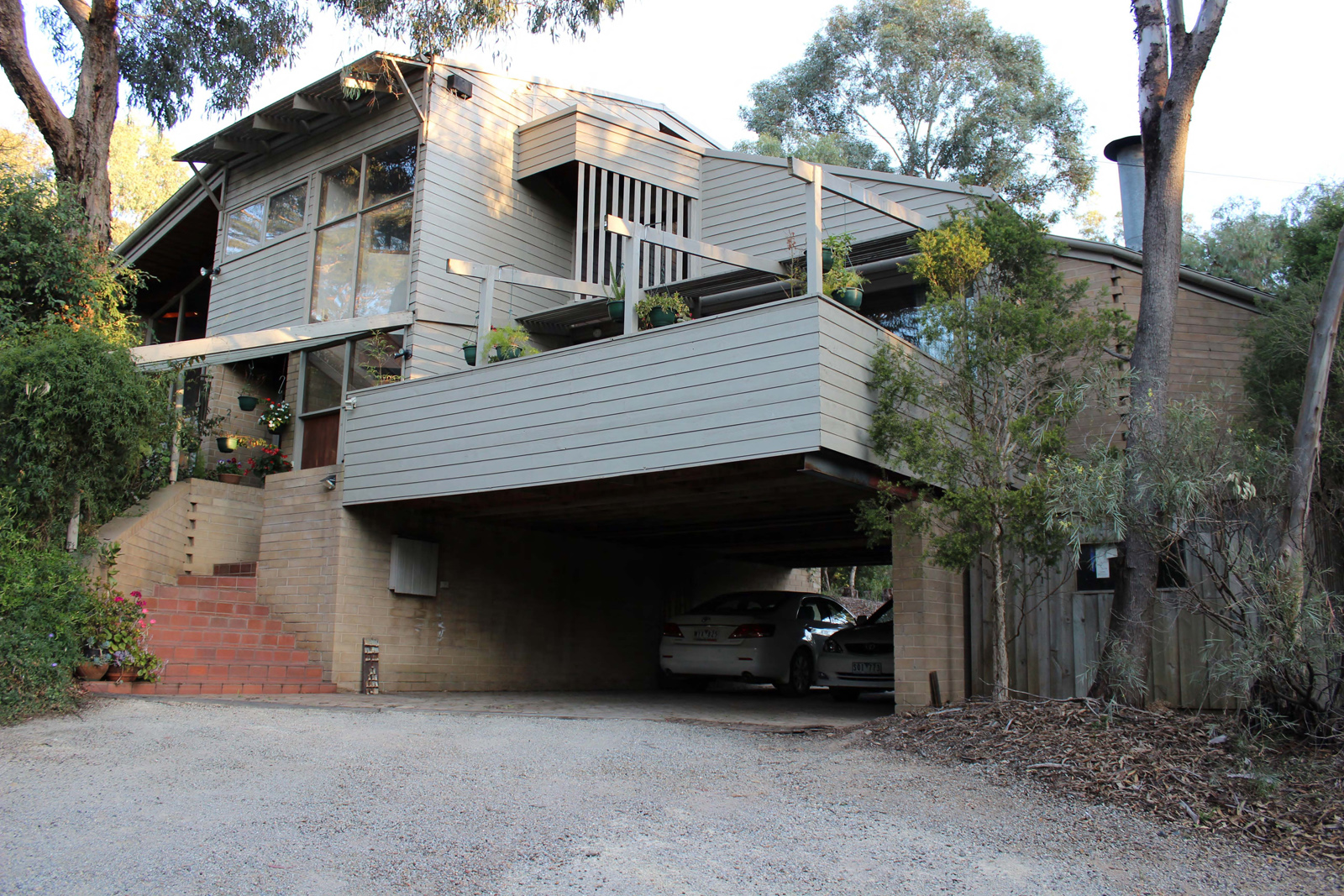
- Entrance View
- Interactive map of the Nichols House area

General information
- Coordinates: 37.7337°S 145.1484°E
- Completed: 1973

Design and construction
- Architect: Kevin Borland

The Nichols House is a residential building in Melbourne designed by the Australian architect Kevin Borland. The construction was completed in 1973 and awarded the OPCD Bronze Medal for The Age/RAIA House of the Year together with Max May’s Rattle House at Harkaway in 1974. The project is a medium density development which shows many of Borland's architectural ideals regarding the configurations of how the modern family dwells in. These ideologies resulted in two major themes, a distinctive connection with the topography of the site and a creative approach to the ideas of family events happening in stages such as a theatre.

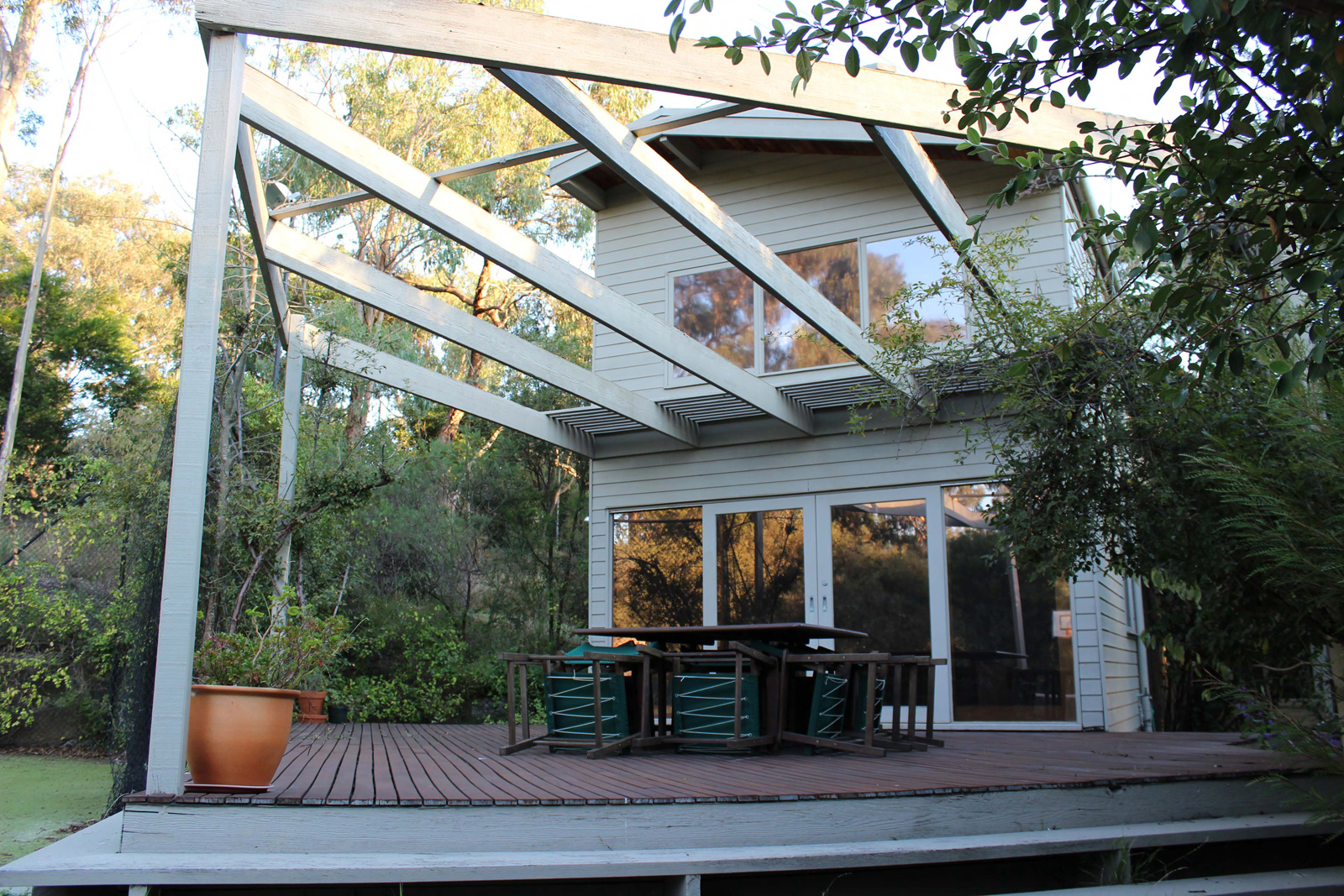
The Nichols House -View of rumpus

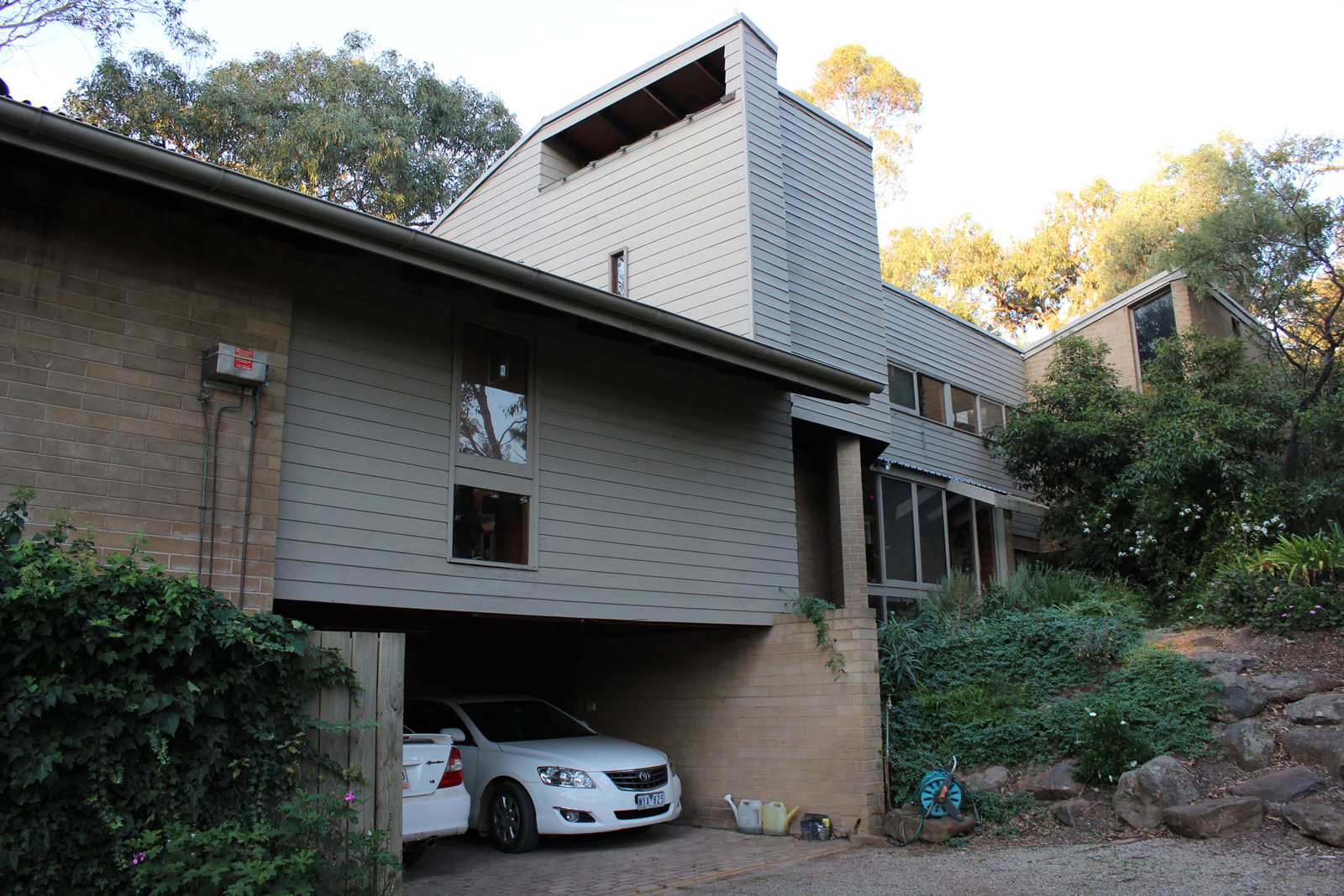
The Nichols House -back view

== Description ==
Kevin Borland quoted that "one's design was as good as the people who lived in them."

According to Conrad Hamann,

The Nichols House demonstrates the constrained architecture of the houses in 1970s.

The large extensive house located in the Eltham bushes overseeing the Yarra, has a wing-form shape. Norman Day points out “It would seem the near north eastern bush suburbs are his to control.” This lolling house made of brick and timber was solely designed based on architectural responses to the needs and spatial necessities that are essential to a family. Timber was used both interior and exterior, such as the benches of the kitchen and the washing table, however the present owner painted the pinus board on the outside because it was cracking and peeling due to the Australian sun over the years.

Because the house is placed on a sharp slanted hill it has pushed the house to have four levels. The most emphasised stage to these spacious to intimate rooms is the dining room. This room, which is connected to the open kitchen, spans into a double height volume that becomes the focus point of the house (Hamann 2006). Borland creates an internal scene where the house is one with the terrain outside; this can be seen in how brick flooring is paved in the entire house. In section view it is a long hallway that connects the many bedrooms, this idea in plans is reflected on the early bi-nuclear bedroom separation, which incorporates the extended family, usually consisting of two separate households, formed by the children and subsequent spouses of the partners in a divorce. When viewed in elevation the house become quite narrow because of its steep nature, but in fact is quite broad when viewed from the inside and drawings. These internal formations reinforce the house as a descending transformation.

The extended space makes the present dining space quite practical also with good view to the back yard and a wider corridor. Another practical area is the separated communal bathroom and wc in the middle of the bedroom wing.

== Key influences and design approach ==
In his article, Hamann states that Charles Moore’s sea ranch apartments and the Elliot Johnson house played a great role in the Nichols house interior design. The stairway is an example of a clear mountain track weaving through the house, which is greatly emphasised by Borland and can be seen in many of Moore’s work. In 1965 stained wood was a major material used in many houses, which can be seen in both of these examples with the interior covered in stained timber. Grounds and neo-Georgian work of John D Moore played with the connections of the context of the buildings and its surroundings. The brick flooring of the house is evident in the surrounding landscape.

According to Hamann, Ralph Erskine’s Borgafjall Ski Lodge in Sweden(1949) demanded a building that would sustain heavy snowfall throughout most of the year. Pylons on the main structure on pin bearings portrayed a disordered visual, the picture it described was very complex where the lounge and dormitory wings came together to create a collided form, which consisted of these pavilions and pylons that supported these clustered spaces. The Nichols House has this unpremeditated journey down the site which becomes a response to the exterior shape of the Erskine’s Ski Lodge where it becomes an answer to the specific placements of space inside that was required, and how that shaped the actual structure of the building.

Based on the idea of family living, the upper bedroom wing transcends down into the eating area, which finishes down into the fireplace this logic of stages becomes a strategic rhythmic pattern of the everyday life, Borland’s interior exercises the role-play of the episodes of the family lifecycle becoming a stage and theatre concept where one event moves to another. This idea of a theatre system comes from the many works of Edmond and Corrigan. This sprawling movement in the interior is evident in Peter Crone’s Poritt house at Mount Martha (1979), which has a v shaped roof that glides to the down. Edmond and Corrigan’s Resurrection School has something similar to the interior of the Nichols house with the sole idea of the school based on an arched wing.

== Awards ==
OPCD (2008) indicated this house was awarded the Bronze Medal for The Age/RAIA House of the Year (1974), jointly with Max May’s Rattle House at Harkaway (q.v.).
