= Kevin Borland =

Australian architect (1926–2000)

- Born: 28 October 1926; West Melbourne, Victoria, Australia
- Died: 5 November 2000 (aged 74); North Fitzroy, Victoria
- Education: Errol Street State School; North Melbourne & University High School; Melbourne Technical College; University of Melbourne
- Occupation: Architect
- Notable work: Preshil School (Junior campus); Harold Holt Memorial Swimming Centre; Olympic Swimming Stadium 1956; Clyde Cameron College
- Style: Modernist; Melbourne Regional; Brutalist (later career)
- Spouses: Margaret Aitken (m. 1954–1979); Huan Chen Tan (m. 1986)
- Children: 6 daughters including Polly Borland, 1 son
- Parents: William Joseph Borland (father); Doris Frances Quinn (mother)
- Awards: Victorian Architecture Medal (1972); Bronze Medal, House of the Year, (1971, 1974 & 1984); Maggie Edmond Enduring Architecture Award (2008 & 2021); National Award for Enduring Architecture (2021)

Kevin William Borland (28 October 1926 – 5 November 2000) was a Melbourne based Australian post-war architect. Over his career his works evolved from an International Modernist stance into a Regionalist aesthetic for which he became most recognised. Many of his significant works were composed of raw materials and considered ‘Brutalist’ typifying Borland’s renowned motto ‘architecture is not for the faint-hearted’.

== Formative years ==
Bornland was born in Melbourne, Victoria, Australia. From 1938 to 1941 he attended University High School and at age 15 was offered a job as office hand at the studio of Best Overend, a pioneer of modernist architecture in Melbourne. That same year he began part-time tuition at the Melbourne Technical College studying Building Construction and Geometrical Drawing. In 1944 Borland attended first year of a Bachelor of Architecture degree at the University of Melbourne before withdrawing to join the Royal Australian Naval Reserve, serving in World War Two from July 1945 to January 1947. Upon return Borland recommenced studies under the newly appointed tutors Roy Grounds and Robin Boyd. During these years Borland was an active member of the University branch of the Communist Party of Australia (CPA) and the Melbourne University Labor Club. Borland’s belief in an idealistic society of economic, educative and social equality was intensified by his experiences at war and remained prevalent throughout his career and life. Borland received the Illuminating Engineers Society Student Award for Light in Architecture in 1949 and in 1950 graduated with second class honours in Town Planning.

== Career ==
During 1951 and 1952, Borland worked for The Age Royal Victorian Institute of Architects Small Homes Service under former tutors Robin Boyd and Neil Clerehan. The service aimed to supply the general public with modest affordable architect-designed homes. Through the service Borland obtained his first two major domestic commissions. The second of these (and first completed) was the Rice House (1952–1953), which used an innovative method of chicken wire reinforced concrete shells in a lightweight form of slender vaulting roofs. The design reflects Borland’s improvisation of medium, and a deep sense of Humanism, which he carried on throughout his career.

Borland’s first public building, in collaboration with John and Phyllis Murphy, Peter McIntyre, and engineering consultant Bill Irwin — the Olympic Swimming Stadium in Melbourne (1952–1956) — precedes many collaborative projects for large institutional buildings. The scheme’s expression of primary structure reveals an idea of the interdependency of all building components.

1957 saw the beginning of the Borland & Trewenack practice which received recognition for works such as Mcarthy House, Stein House (1959), and Preshil School Hall (1962). After eight years Borland established an independent practice, and over the next decade became widely recognized, receiving numerous accolades for both residential and public commissions.

Borland died on 5 November 2000, in Fitzroy, Victoria.

== Awards ==
- RAIA Victorian Architecture Medal (Bronze) for Outstanding Building, 1972. School Hall at Preshil (Junior Campus), Kew (1962).
- RAIA Victorian Chapter, Citation in the Public Buildings category, 1969. Harold Holt Memorial Swimming Centre, Glen Iris (1968–69).
- RAIA Victorian Chapter House of the Year, 1972. Paton House, Portsea (1970).
- RAIA Victorian Chapter, Bronze Medal in category ‘House of the Year’, 1974. Nichols House, Eltham (1973).
- RAIA Victorian Chapter, Citation, 1974. Crossman Flats, Launching Place (1973).
- RAIA Victorian Chapter, Citation, 1977. New Gordon House, South Melbourne (1974–76).
- RAIA Victorian Chapter, Citation, 1978. Mount Eliza North Primary School, (1977).
- RAIA Tasmanian Chapter declared among the ten notable Tasmanian buildings of 1980. Fitzgerald House, Hobart, Tasmania (1979)
- RAIA Victorian Chapter House of the Year, 1984. Roger Evans Residence, Queenscliff (1983).
- RAIA Victorian Chapter award for Outstanding Architecture in residential alterations, 1991. Borland Residence, Newport (1989–90)
- Dulux Colour Award for Residential Building and ‘Belle’ magazine Colorbond Steel Award, 1994. 10 x 1 bedroom housing units for Ministry of Housing, Collingwood.

== Gallery ==
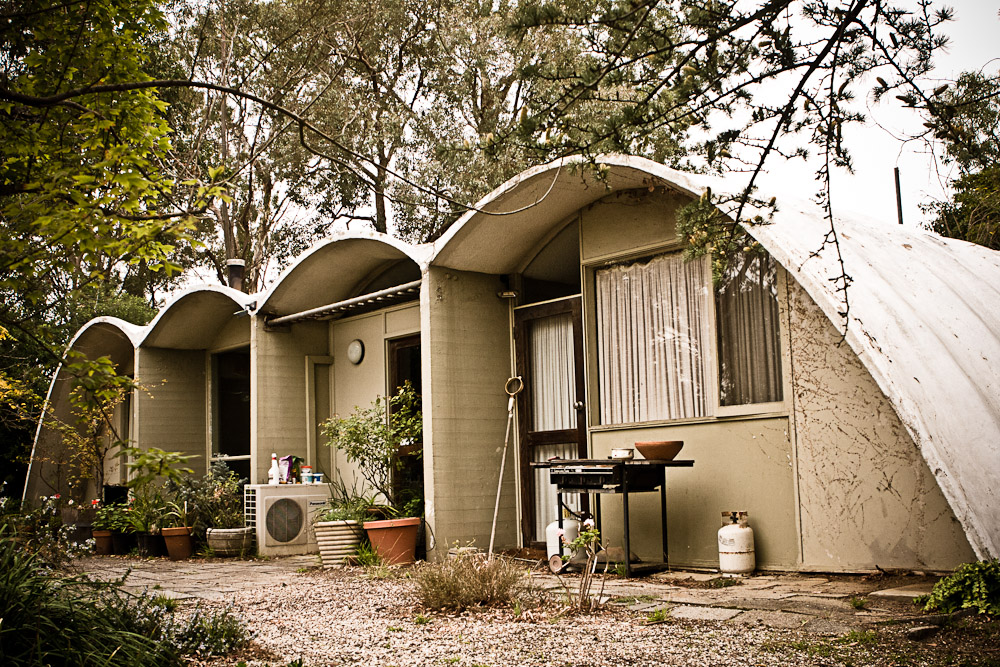
Rice house, main wing

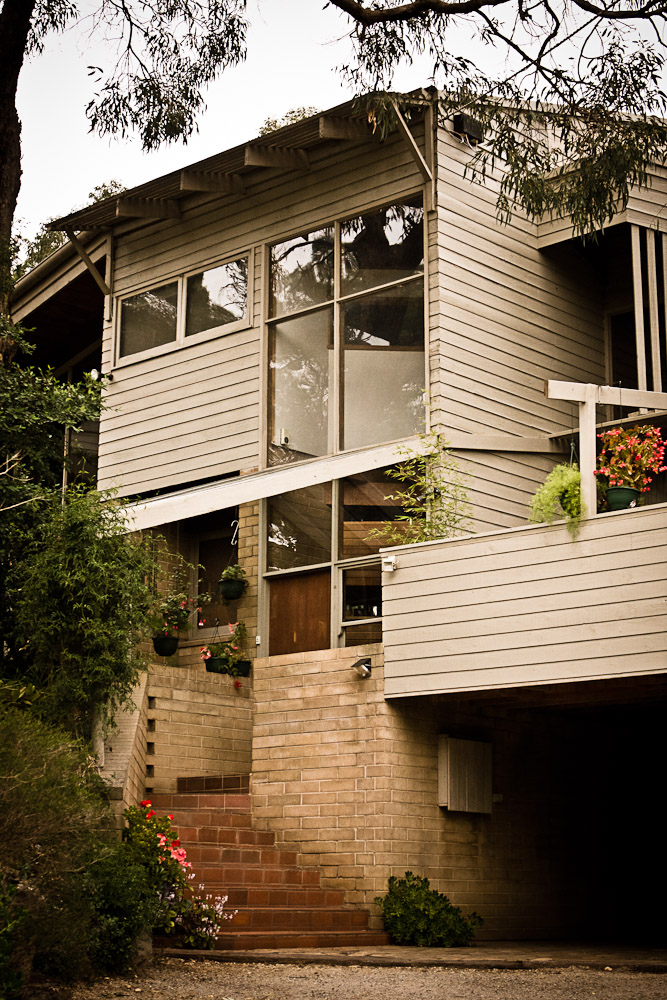
The Nichols House

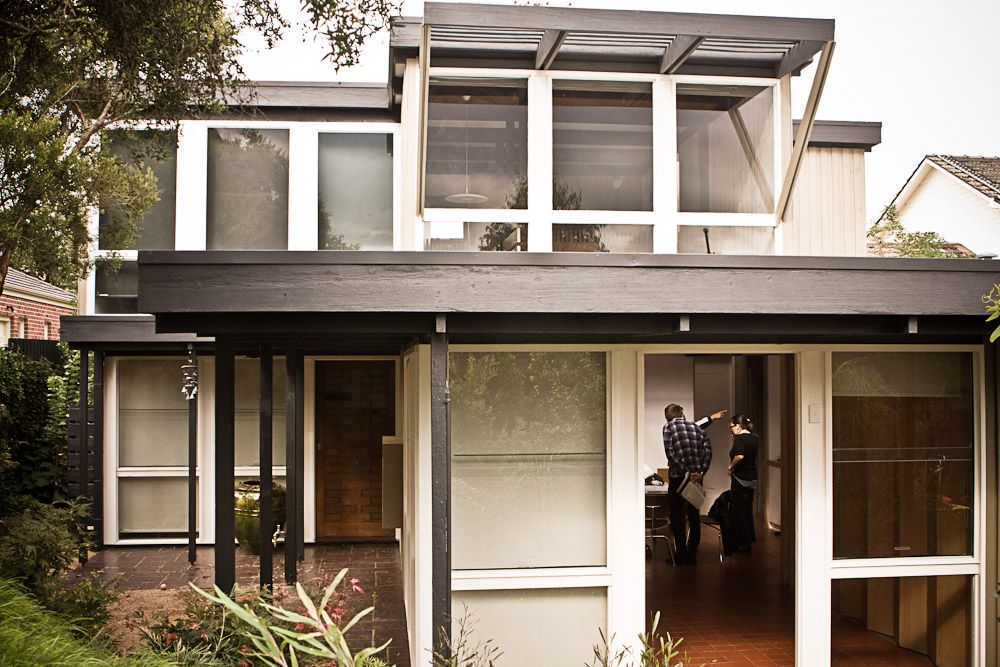
Bebarfald house

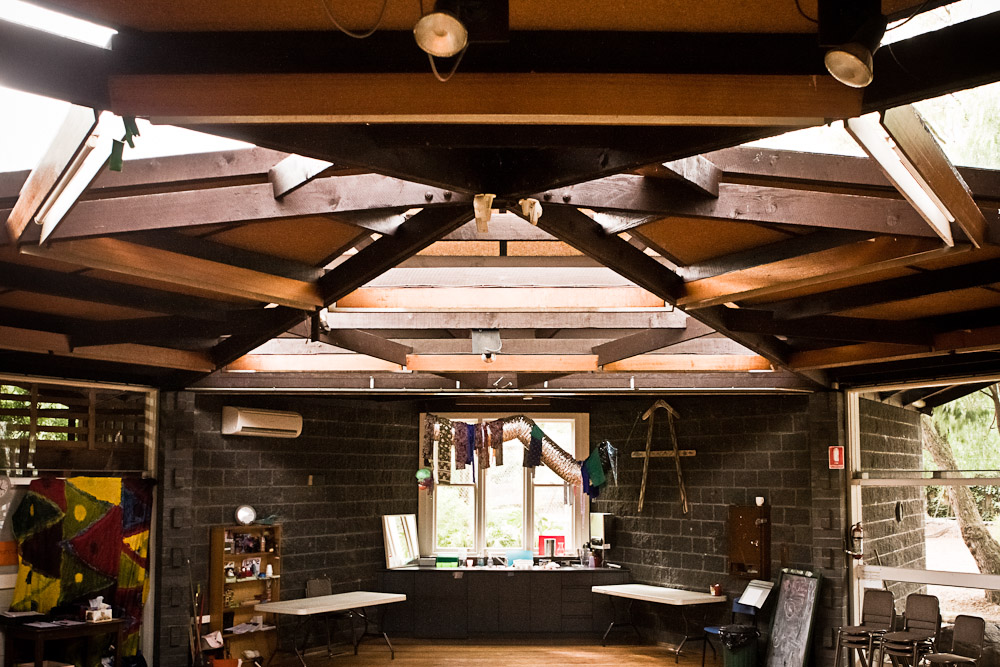
Preshil School hall

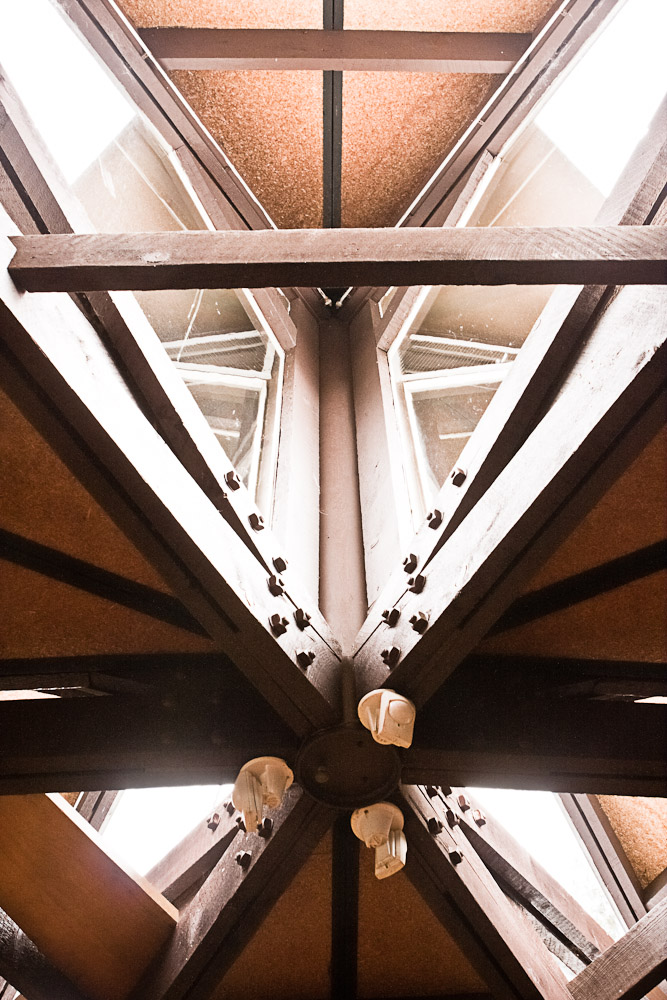
Preshil hall, skylight junction

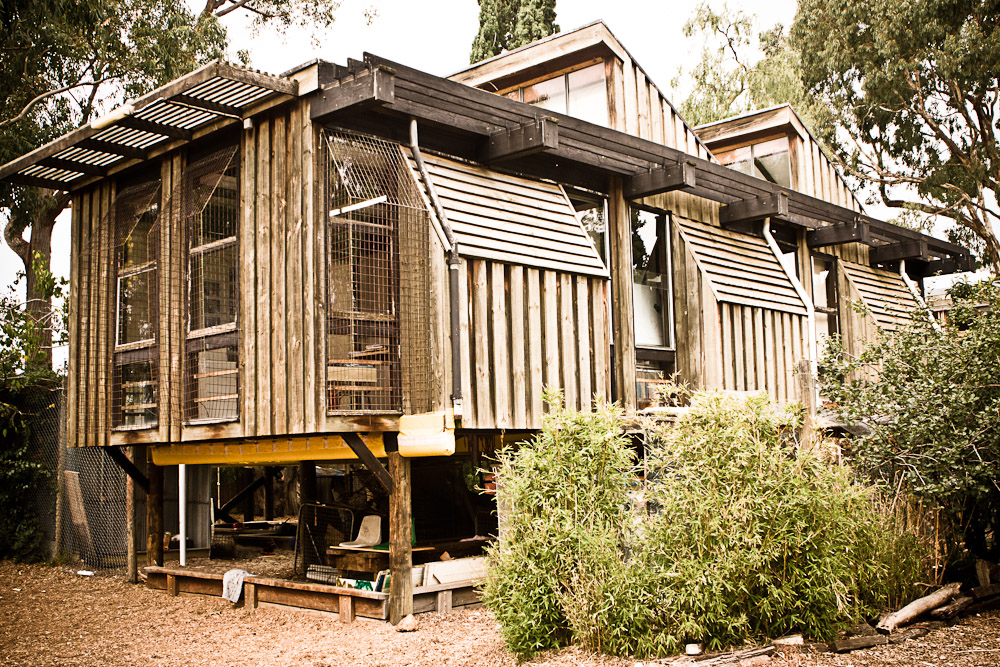
Preshil tutorial rooms

Fitzgerald House
