= Bangs (rapper) =

- Also known as: Bangs, Ur Boy Bangs, Ur Boi Bangs, Mutal Bangz
- Born: Ajak Chol; 28 September 1990 (age 36); Juba, Sudan (now South Sudan)
- Origin: Melbourne, Victoria, Australia
- Genres: Hip hop , Outsider Music
- Occupations: Rapper; songwriter; record producer
- Years active: 2004–present
- Label: HSM Entertainment
- Formerly of: Nubian Knights
- Website: http://www.bangs8.com/ (archived)

Ajak Chol (born 28 September 1990), better known by his stage names Bangs, Ur Boy Bangs, or Ur Boi Bangs, and formerly Bstar Bangs, is a South Sudanese-born Australian rapper. He released viral songs, "Take U to Da Movies" (2009) and "Meet Me on Facebook" (August 2010). In December 2009, he released an album, Hard 2 Be Up.

== Early life and education ==
Ajak Chol was born in Juba, South Sudan. At the age of 11, he moved to Egypt with his family after his father married another wife. He spent two years there before emigrating to Australia with his family in 2003.

== Career ==
Bangs has cited that he was inspired to make music after hearing Soulja Boy.

In 2005, Chol formed the Nubian Knights, a hip-hop collective with fellow East African migrants Ezeldin Deng, Francis Dbuia, Abraham Adet, and Tong Bol. It resulted from the Footscray Community Arts Centre's "ID Check" project. The Nubian Knights produced a self-titled album and performed at St Jerome's Laneway Festival in 2009.

Chol recorded his debut album Hard 2 Be Up in mid-2008 at Gateway Living Music Studios in Footscray, Victoria, with producer John Favaro. In 2009, he posted "Take U to Da Movies" on YouTube as a satire on real rap music, where it became a viral hit after a few months. In 2010, he appeared at the Melbourne Big Day Out on the Lilyworld stage, he recorded two singles, titled "Meet Me on Facebook" and "Christmas Story". A percentage of profit from each sale of "Christmas Story" was donated to the International Rescue Committee, to aid their work in Sudan.

Bangs has collaborated with other Sudanese artists such as Ezu on his song "Hi Haters", Click Fablice on "I Know U Like", and Lil' Fablice on "Forever".

Bangs is signed to record label HSM Entertainment.

In 2011, Bangs released his second album Reflections. His most recent album is Bangz the Don, released in December 2012. He also released his first mixtape called NICE in September 2013 as a free download on HotNewHipHop, with part two released on 28 September 2014 – Bangs' birthday.

Bangs recorded his first album in 2008 in an Australian studio. By late 2009, his internet visibility began to grow as he increased in fame when his video became a viral hit. Bangs was discovered and interviewed on Eminem's internet radio station in 2009. When videos of the interview appeared on YouTube, his fame skyrocketed and several of his music videos accumulated millions of views.

Bangs became visible enough in the mainstream media that in 2010 Honda hired him for an advertisement. The advertisement asked, "How much rap can you fit into a Honda Jazz", and featured Bangs rapping to the beat of "Take U to Da Movies". On the 15 July 2015 episode of The Tonight Show Starring Jimmy Fallon, his song, "Take U to Da Movies", was used in a segment, "Do not Play", where both Fallon and the show's announcer, Steve Higgins, "ridiculed" and "mocked" him. On 19 July, Bangs released a diss track directed at Fallon, "Ur Boy Bangs – Response to Jimmy Fallon – Do not Watch". On 25 July, Bangs performed the track live to an audience at Laundry Bar in Fitzroy, Victoria.

Bangs completed his first tour of New Zealand in May 2014, playing shows in Auckland and Wellington.

== Discography ==
=== Albums ===
- 2009: Hard to Be Up
- 2011: Reflections
- 2023: The Last Album

=== Singles ===
- 2010: "Take U to Da Movies"
- 2010: "Meet Me on Facebook"
- 2010: "Christmas Story"
- 2011: "Livin My Life" featuring EZU
- 2011: "Hi Haterz" featuring EZU
- 2012: "I Know U Like" featuring Click Fablice
- 2013: "It Was My Mistake"
- 2013: "Christmas Story Part II"
- 2019: “Take U To KFC”
- 2020: “Take U To Burger Kings/Hungry Jack’s”
- 2020: “Christmas Story Pt 6”
- 2022: “Take U to Starbucks”
- 2023: “Take U To Domino’s”

=== Guest appearances ===
- 2016: "Ayo" B-Nasty featuring Bangs, Breezy & EZU
