= Barkly Theatre =

Cinema in Melbourne, Australia, 1914–1962

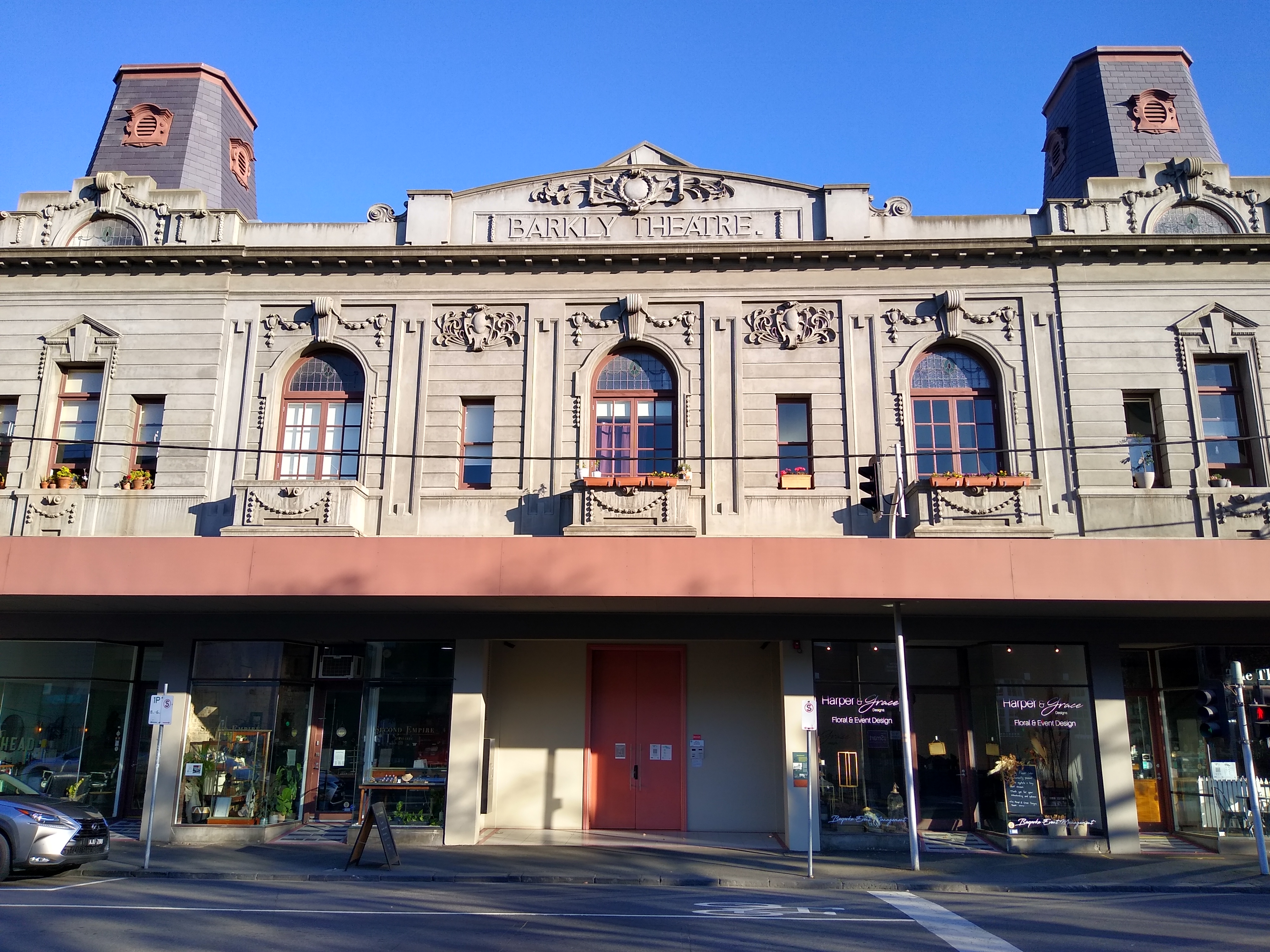
- The former theatre facade, in 2022

- Location of the former theatre in Greater Metropolitan Melbourne
- Interactive map of Barkly Theatre
- Address: 277-287 Barkly Street
- Location: Footscray, Melbourne, Victoria, Australia
- Coordinates: 37°47′58″S 144°53′41″E
- Owner: Barkly Picture Theatre Company Limited (1914–1926); Hoyts (1926–1962); anor (since 1962– )
- Capacity: 1,403 seats
- Type: Cinema theatre
- Current use: Residential apartments

Construction
- Opened: 17 October 1914; 112 years ago
- Closed: 20 January 1962 (as a cinema); 1993 (other uses)
- Rebuilt: from 2018 (as residential apartments)
- Years active: 1914–1962 (as a cinema)
- Architects: William A.M. Blackett & Forster

Site notes
- Architectural style: Edwardian Baroque

Victorian Heritage Register
- Official name: Former Barkly Theatre
- Type: Registred place
- Designated: 28 August 1991
- Reference no.: H0878
- Heritage overlay no.: HO29

Register of the National Estate
- Official name: Barkly Picture Theatre (former)
- Type: Defunct register
- Criteria: B.2 and D.2
- Designated: 30 June 1992
- Reference no.: 18164

The Barkly Theatre is a former independent cinema theatre located on Barkly Street, Footscray, an inner-western suburb of Melbourne, in Victoria, Australia. Operated as a cinema between 1914 and 1962, the building was repurposed as residential apartments in 2018.

The former theatre was added to the Victorian Heritage Register on 28 August 1991, and was added to the now defunct Register of the National Estate on 30 June 1992.

== Description ==
The Barkly Theatre was constructed for the Barkly Picture Theatre Company Limited, designed by William A.M. Blackett, of the architectural firm Blackett and Forster, in the Edwardian Baroque style.

The independent cinema opened its doors on 17 October 1914 with pictures and a vaudeville program and is among the earliest purpose-built cinemas in Australia. It is the oldest surviving cinema exterior in Australia. The facade's mansard-styled towers were reminiscent of the Second Empire theatre and hotel designs of the late nineteenth century. The theatre was designed to seat approximately 1,200 people and was, at the time of construction, one of only a few substantial buildings of this type constructed in Melbourne.

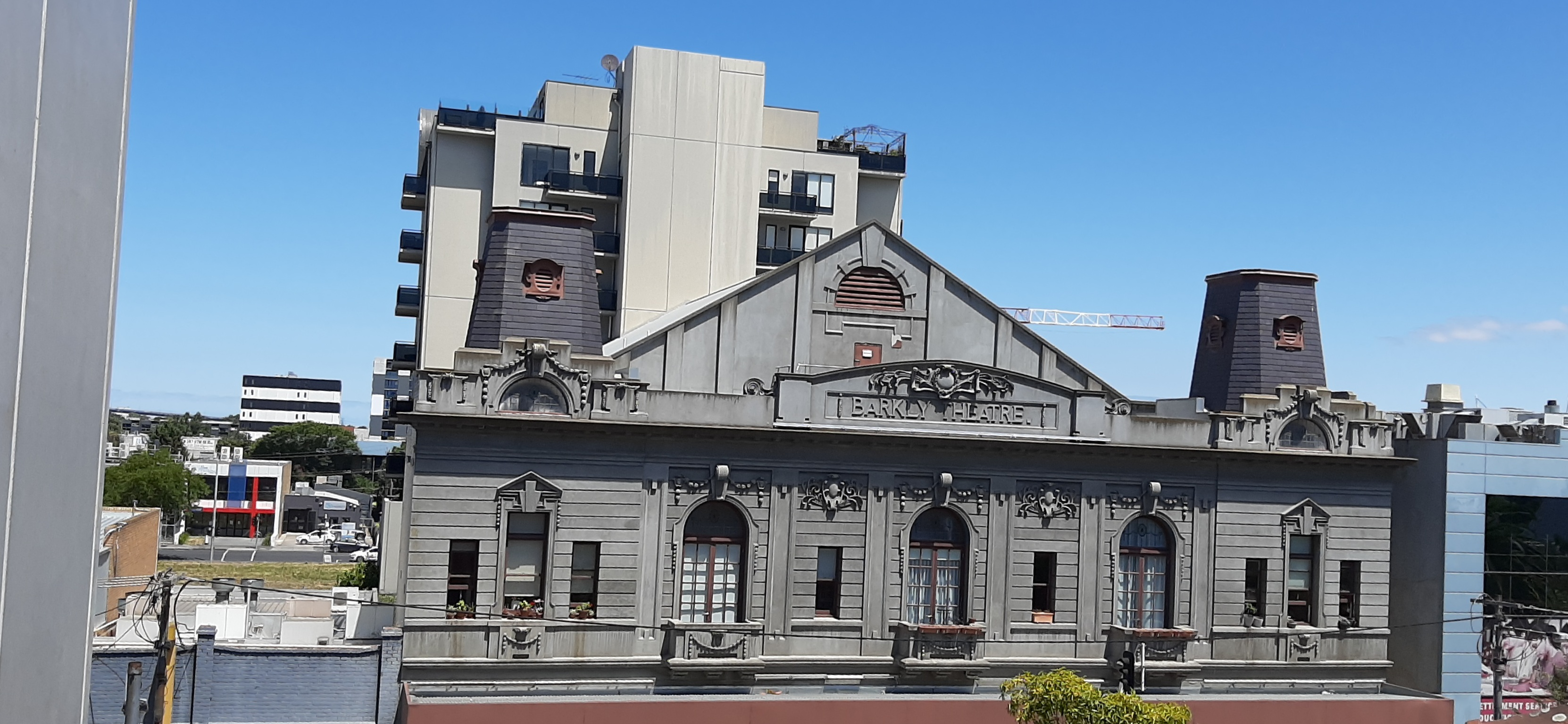
The former theatre in 2023, with the apartment complex tower at rear

Taken over by Hoyts in 1926, the cinema closed in 1962 and was subsequently used, until 1993, as a restaurant and function venue when the central entry was modified. The building's facade is substantially intact as constructed in 1914. The fly tower was damaged by storm on 29 December 1990 and was partially demolished, and the building was affected by a fire in 1995 and fell into disrepair.

Acquired by Chris Grant and business partners in March 2000, a proposal to redevelop the site faltered and the building was again sold in c. 2003. In 2008 it was reported that the property was being redeveloped into residential apartments with a high-rise tower above the rear of the theatre structure. The 12-storey residential development was approved in 2018.

== Legacy ==
The Sun Theatre, an independent cinema located in nearby Yarraville, also on the Victorian Heritage Register, named one of their cinemas as The Barkly, in honour of the former Barkly Theatre.

== See also ==
- List of theatres in Melbourne
- List of places on the Victorian Heritage Register in the City of Maribyrnong
