= List of places on the Victorian Heritage Register in the City of Maribyrnong =

This is a list of places on the Victorian Heritage Register in the City of Maribyrnong in Victoria, Australia. The Victorian Heritage Register is maintained by the Heritage Council of Victoria.

The Victorian Heritage Register, as of 2020, listed the following 22 state-registered places within the City of Maribyrnong:

Place name	Place #	Location	Suburb or Town	Co-ordinates	Built	State registered	Photo
Barkly Theatre	H0878	277-287 Barkly St	Footscray	37°47′58″S 144°53′41″E	1914	28 August 1991	
CSR sugar refinery complex	H1311	265 Whitehall St	Yarraville	37°49′09″S 144°54′16″E	1872-73	8 May 1997	
Ercildoune	H0494	66 Napier St	Footscray	37°48′15″S 144°54′07″E	1876	26 August 1981	
ETA Foods Factory	H1916	254 Ballarat Road	Braybrook	37°46′47″S 144°51′33″E	1961	31 May 2001	
Footscray Park	H1220	4-68 Ballarat Road	Footscray	37°47′38″S 144°54′20″E	1911	21 November 1996	
Footscray Primary School	H1713	100 Geelong Road	Footscray	37°47′54″S 144°53′33″E	1868	20 August 1982	
Footscray railway station	H1563	Irving and Hyde Sts	Footscray	37°48′09″S 144°54′05″E	1900	20 August 1982	
Footscray Town Hall	H1218	61 Napier St	Footscray	37°48′16″S 144°54′02″E	1936	21 November 1996	
Henderson House	H0183	43-45 Moreland St	Footscray	37°48′11″S 144°54′27″E	1872-73	9 October 1974	
Jack's Magazine	H1154	off La Scala Ave	Maribyrnong	37°46′54″S 144°53′43″E	1876-78	18 April 1996	
Kariwara District Scout Headquarters	H1343	4 Hyde St	Footscray	37°48′13″S 144°54′05″E	1925-29	4 September 1997	
Kinnears Ropeworks	H2067	124-188 Ballarat Road	Footscray	37°47′30″S 144°53′33″E	1909	3 March 2005	
Maribyrnong Migrant Hostel	H2190	61-71 Hampstead Road	Maidstone	37°46′34″S 144°52′37″E	1942 (Note: Built as an explosives factory, repurposed many times since.)	12 February 2009	
Maribyrnong tram substation	H2321	149A and 149B Raleigh Road	Maribyrnong	37°46′14″S 144°53′05″E	1941-42	12 December 2013	
Pipemakers Park Complex	H1503	2 Van Ness Ave	Maribyrnong	37°46′35″S 144°53′40″E	1868	20 August 1982	
Royal Australian Field Artillery Barracks	H1098	Wests Rd, Ordnance Reserve and Waterford Ave	Maribyrnong	37°46′24″S 144°52′51″E	1911	5 October 1995	
Saltwater River Crossing Site and Footscray Wharves Precinct	H1397	west bank of the Maribyrnong River	Footscray	37°48′05″S 144°54′30″E	1800s	11 December 1997	
Saltwater River Rail Bridge	H1213	across the Maribyrnong River	Footscray and West Melbourne	37°47′54″S 144°54′58″E	1858-59	24 October 1996	
State Savings Bank building	H0723	13 Ballarat St	Yarraville	37°48′59″S 144°53′28″E	1909	22 February 1989	
Sun Theatre	H0679	6-12 Ballarat St	Yarraville	37°48′58″S 144°53′27″E	1938	23 December 1987	
The Pebbles	H1308	57A Droop St	Footscray	37°47′47″S 144°53′47″E	1920	16 October 1997	
Yarraville railway station complex	H2447	Goulburn and Murray Streets (includes Anderson St crossing)	Yarraville	37°48′59″S 144°53′23″E	1890	19 December 2024 (Note: Initial listing was on 29 September 1994 and included Anderson Street crossing only. Heritage curtail expanded in 2024 to cover entire railway station complex.)	
