= Kinnears Ropeworks =

Former textiles factory in Melbourne, Victoria, Australia

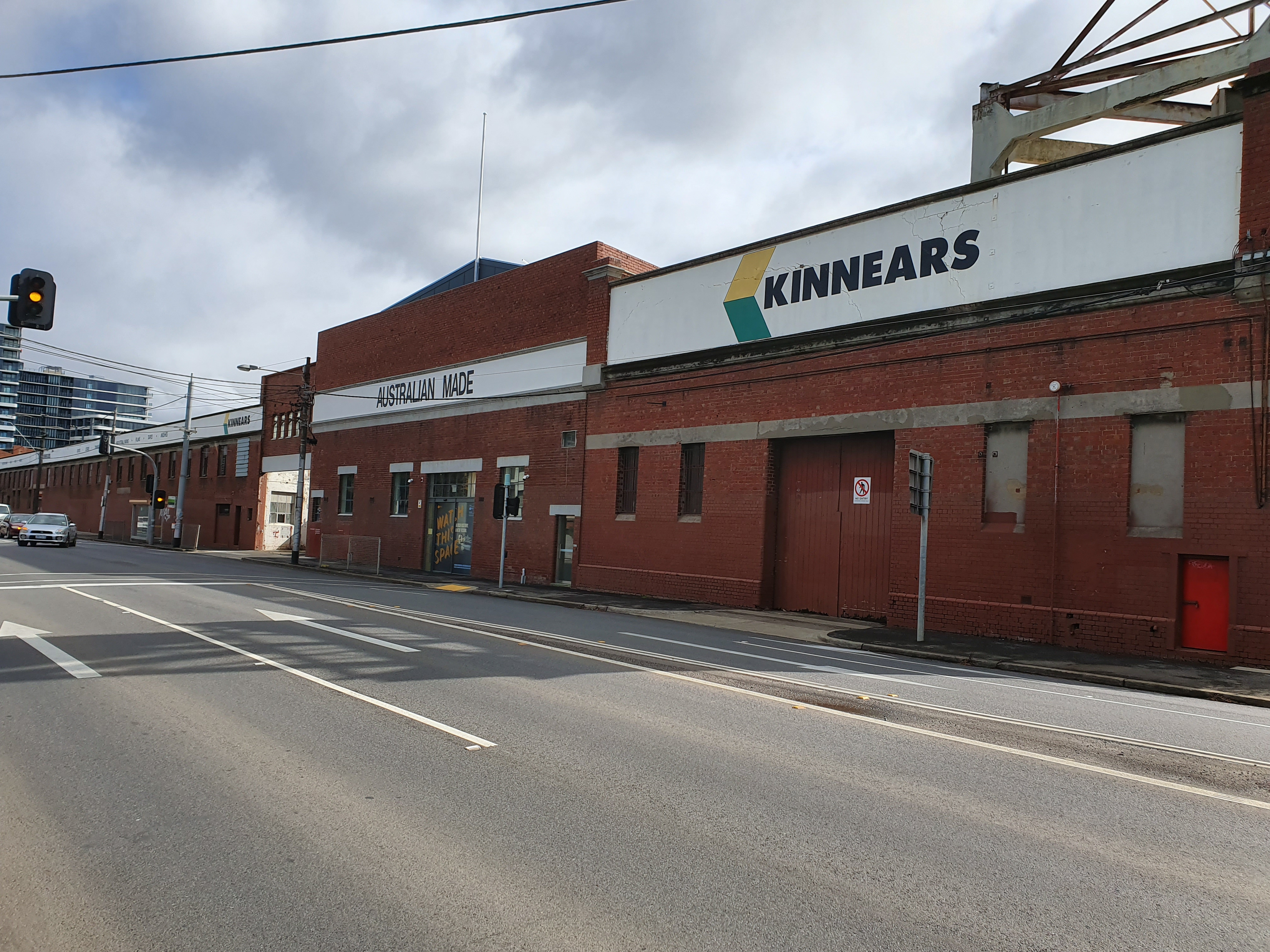
- The factory in 2020

- Location within Melbourne
- Interactive map of the Kinnears Ropeworks area

General information
- Status: Completed
- Type: Textile manufacturing plant
- Location: Footscray, Melbourne, Victoria, Australia, 124-188 Ballarat Road
- Coordinates: 37°47′30″S 144°53′31″E
- Year built: 1909–1969
- Completed: 1969; 57 years ago
- Closed: 2002
- Client: George Kinnear & Sons Pty Ltd

Technical details
- Material: Red bricks, iron roofs
- Size: 3.3 ha (8.2 acres)

Victorian Heritage Register
- Official name: Kinnears Ropeworks
- Type: Registered place
- Designated: 3 March 2005
- Reference no.: H2067
- Heritage overlay no.: HO90
- Category: Manufacturing and Processing

The Kinnears Ropeworks is a heritage-listed former textile manufacturing plant, located on Ballarat Road, in Footscray, an inner-western suburb of Melbourne, in Victoria, Australia. The 3.3-hectare (8-acre) site was a large industrial complex of red-brick buildings built between 1909 and 1969.

The site was added to the Victorian Heritage Register on 3 March 2005 in recognition of its historical, social, scientific (technological) and architectural significance; and added to non-statutory heritage lists by the Victorian branch of the National Trust on 8 September 2004 and the City of Maribyrnong on an unknown date.

Kinnears ceased manufacturing on the site in 2002 and since the 2010s, the precinct has been redeveloped for residential housing, retail, offices, and community use.

== History ==
Kinnears Ropeworks was established by George Kinnear in Moonee Ponds in 1874. After the death George, two of his sons, Ted and Harry, moved the works in 1903 to Footscray. The introduction of tariff protection may have influenced the move. Badly damaged by fire in 1908, the factory was rebuilt in 1909.

Kinnears Ropeworks produced a large range of rope and twine products for domestic, commercial, agricultural, fishing, shipping, transport, textile, and other industrial purposes. They also manufactured carpet yarns and were leaders in the innovation of the production of synthetic yarns. Under manpower legislation during World War II, the factory produced a range of materials for military use, and also diversified into camouflage netting and parachute cords. The factory employed a large number of women during this period.

Manufacturing in Victoria was reinvigorated with postwar immigration and by the 1970s the company was employing a significant number of non-British migrants, mainly from Italy, Greece, Macedonia and Turkey. Kinnears expanded further in the early 1970s when it made significant inroads into the carpet industry.

The progressive reduction of tariffs from the 1980s and increased urbanisation of the inner-west forced the factory's closure in 2002. Since the 2010s, the precinct has progressively been redeveloped predominately for residential housing, with major fires occurring on the site in 2017 and 2024.

== Description ==
The buildings reflect the industrial processes of the site and include a number of manufacturing and storage buildings built in a rudimentary industrial manner of brick walls and saw tooth roofs. The earliest and most intact buildings are the service buildings that include the engineers' stores and workshops, boiler house and chimney and the spooling room which displays its original brick paved floor. The internal workings and communications between the various facets of industry on the site are represented by the internal laneway system. The site also includes a particularly rare example of a rope walk.

At the time of its inclusion on the Victorian Heritage Register in 2005, the scope of the complex's curtail included the former polymer store, several mills, a rope walk, several warehouses for raw materials and finished products, the former boiler house and engineers' store, workshop and spooling room, administration buildings, and the mess. Most of these structures were damaged by fires in 2017 and 2024, although the Ballarat Road facade remains intact.

== See also ==
- List of places on the Victorian Heritage Register in the City of Maribyrnong
