= Queenie Williams =

Australian child actress

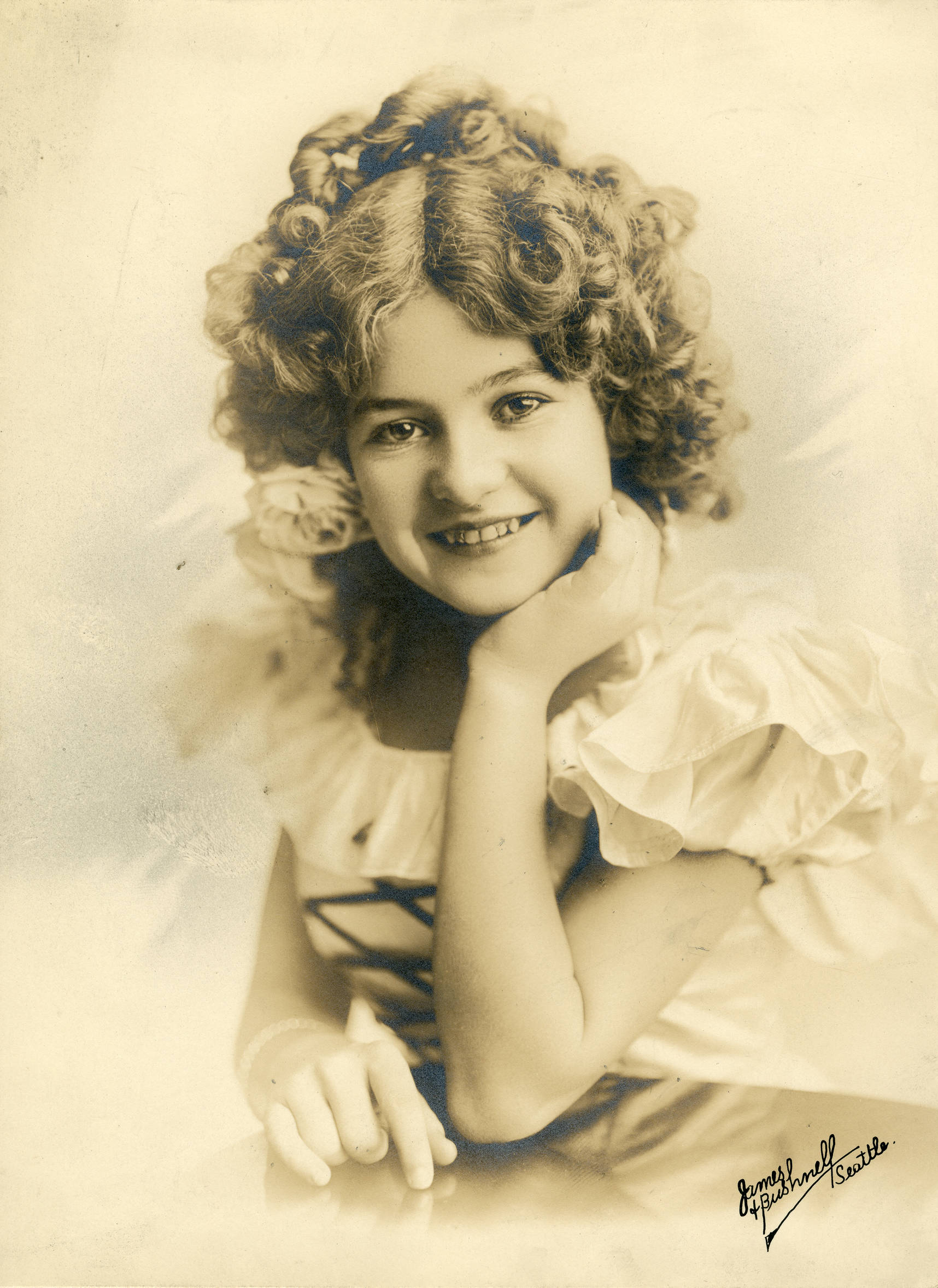
- Queenie Williams, from a 1910s publicity photograph
- Born: Alfreda Ina Williams; November 17, 1896; Footscray, Victoria, Australia
- Died: June 9, 1962 (aged 65); Santa Monica, California, US
- Occupations: Actress, singer, dancer

Queenie Williams (November 17, 1896 – June 9, 1962), also billed as Little Queenie Williams and later as Ina Williams, was an Australian actress, singer, comedian, and dancer.

== Early life ==
Alfreda Ina Williams was born in Footscray, near Melbourne, in 1896, the daughter of Frank Williams and Annie Armstrong Williams. She trained as a dancer with Mrs. William Green and Florrie Green in Melbourne.

== Career ==
Williams appeared in The Fatal Wedding (1906), touring Australia and New Zealand with the Meynell & Gunn show. She also performed in Meynell & Gunn's The Rake's Wife (1906–1907), The Grey Kimona (1907), The Little Breadwinner (1908), and The Old Folks at Home (1909), as well as revivals of The Fatal Wedding.

Beginning in 1912, she toured with Pollard's Juvenile Opera Company in the United States and Canada in the years before and during World War I. She also became a solo act with a short musical comedy sketch called "Married via Wireless". She was noted for her slight stature and skills as a dancer; her singing voice was "of ample range, adequate volume and quality that is tenderly sympathetic." In 1914 she joined other actresses "who have agreed never to wear a bird's body or wing on their hats or to wear animal skins as furs."

After the war, as a young woman, she used the name "Ina Williams" on the vaudeville stage in the North America. Some of her other partners in vaudeville acts were Hal Skelly, Teddy MacNamara (in "The Guide of Monte Carlo"), Dick Keene, Johnny Dooley, and Jere Delaney. She retired from the stage in 1932.

== Personal life ==
Williams married theatrical manager Ernest Chester in 1914. They were separated by the end of 1919. She married again in 1923, to engineer Charles Stecher. They had a daughter and lived in New Jersey. She died in Santa Monica, California, June 9, 1962.
