= Ercildoune, Footscray =

Former bank building in Melbourne, Victoria, Australia

Ercildoune
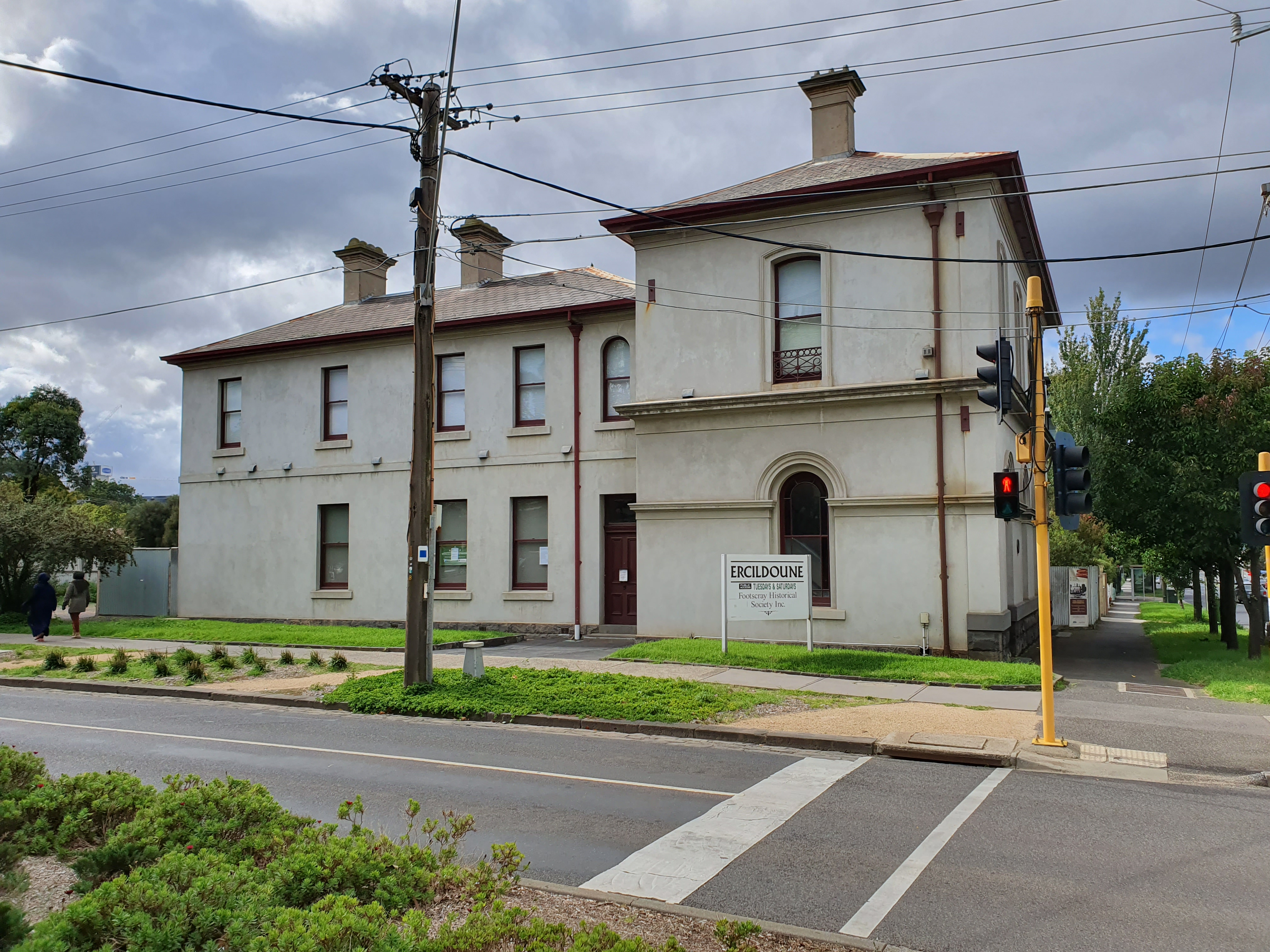
- The building in 2020

- Location within Melbourne
- Interactive map of the Ercildoune area

General information
- Status: Completed
- Architectural style: Victorian Italianate
- Location: 66 Napier Street, Footscray, Melbourne, Victoria, Australia
- Coordinates: 37°48′15″S 144°54′7″E
- Completed: 1876; 150 years ago
- Client: National Bank of Australasia
- Owner: Footscray Historical Society (since 1970)

Technical details
- Material: Cement, bluestone, slate, ceramic tiles
- Floor count: 2

Design and construction
- Architect: Leonard Terry
- Architecture firm: Terry and Oakden
- Main contractor: Goss Hopkins

Victorian Heritage Register
- Official name: Ercildoune
- Type: Registered place
- Designated: 26 August 1981
- Reference no.: H0494
- Heritage overlay on.: HO55
- Categories: Commercial; Residential buildings (private)

Register of the National Estate
- Official name: Ercildoune
- Type: Defunct register
- Criteria: A.4, E.1, and F.1
- Designated: undated
- Reference no.: 15093

Ercildoune is a former bank building, now community offices, located at 66 Napier Street in Footscray, an inner-western suburb of Melbourne, in Victoria, Australia. Built in 1876 as a bank branch, the building has variously been used as a residence from 1919 to 1970, and was extensively renovated and restored in 1975. The building is owned by the Footscray Historical Society and used as offices for the non-profit organisation.

The property was added to the Victorian Heritage Register on 26 August 1981 in recognition of its architectural and historical significance; having been added to a non-statutory list by the Victorian branch of the National Trust on 20 October 1969; and was added, on an unknown date, to the now defunct Register of the National Estate.

== History ==
Ercildoune was built as a local branch for the National Bank of Australasia, designed by Leonard Terry, of prolific bank architects, Terry and Oakden, in the Victorian Italianate style. Previously operating in temporary premises since 1872, the bank branch opened in 1876 and remained in this location until 1918 when it relocated to the Colonial Bank building in Barkly Street when the banks amalgamated in 1918. The following year, the building was converted residential use, was divided into flats in 1940, and purchased by the Footscray Historical Society in 1970, in a dilapidated state, and subsequently restored.

== Description ==
Ercildoune is a rendered bluestone two-storey (Note: Victorian branch of the National Trust states it is three storeys.) building designed in a simple Victorian Italianate style. It consists of two sections, the main one originally containing the banking chamber and manager’s residence above, and the rear section containing the service wing. Both sections have hipped slate roofs and simple detailing. The main facade of the building is symmetrically composed with two arched porticos and two windows on the ground floor. Four corresponding windows at the first floor level have segmental arches and iron balustrade panels. A substantial cornice divides the two levels.

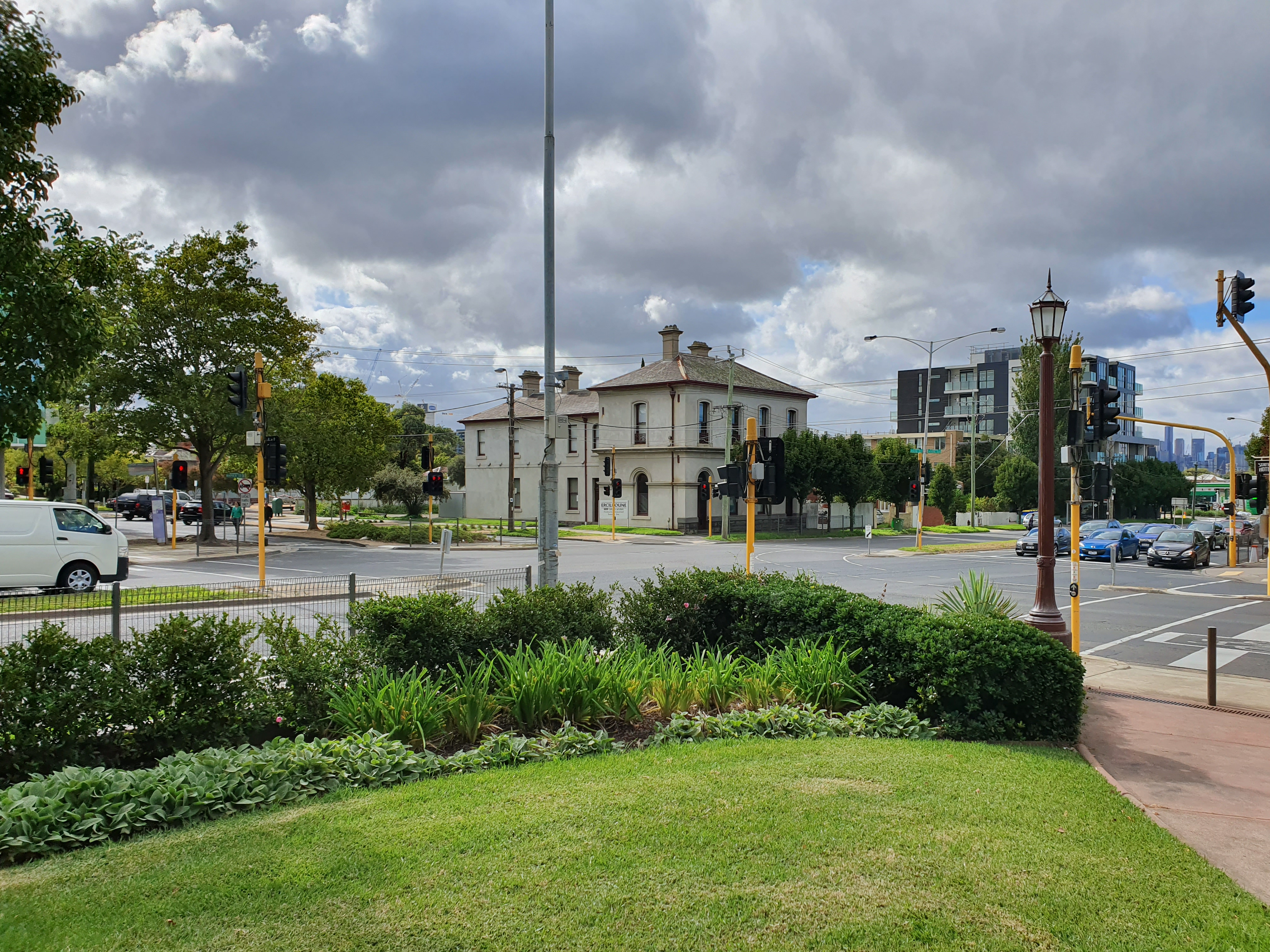
Ercildoune, viewed from across the road, in 2020

Since its construction, a toilet block adjoining the service wing was added. The building remains largely intact including retention of the original banking chamber tessellated tile floor. Although in a poor condition when acquired by the Footscray Historical Society in 1970, the building was subsequently restored.

The Ercildoune Reserve is a small urban park located adjacent to the building.

== See also ==
- Architecture of Melbourne
- List of places on the Victorian Heritage Register in the City of Maribyrnong
