= The Footscray Advertiser =

Former newspaper in Victoria, Australia

The Footscray Advertiser was a weekly newspaper published from 1874 until 1982 in Footscray, Melbourne, Australia.

The Advertiser was operated by many different proprietors in its early days but from 1897 until the 1960s it was in the hands of the Jamieson family. In 1966 the Advertiser was owned by Cumberland Newspapers and was known as the Western Suburbs Advertiser from 1966 until 1982 when it ceased publication.

== See also ==
List of newspapers in Australia
