= Footscray Wharves Precinct =

Historical wharf precinct in Melbourne, Victoria, Australia

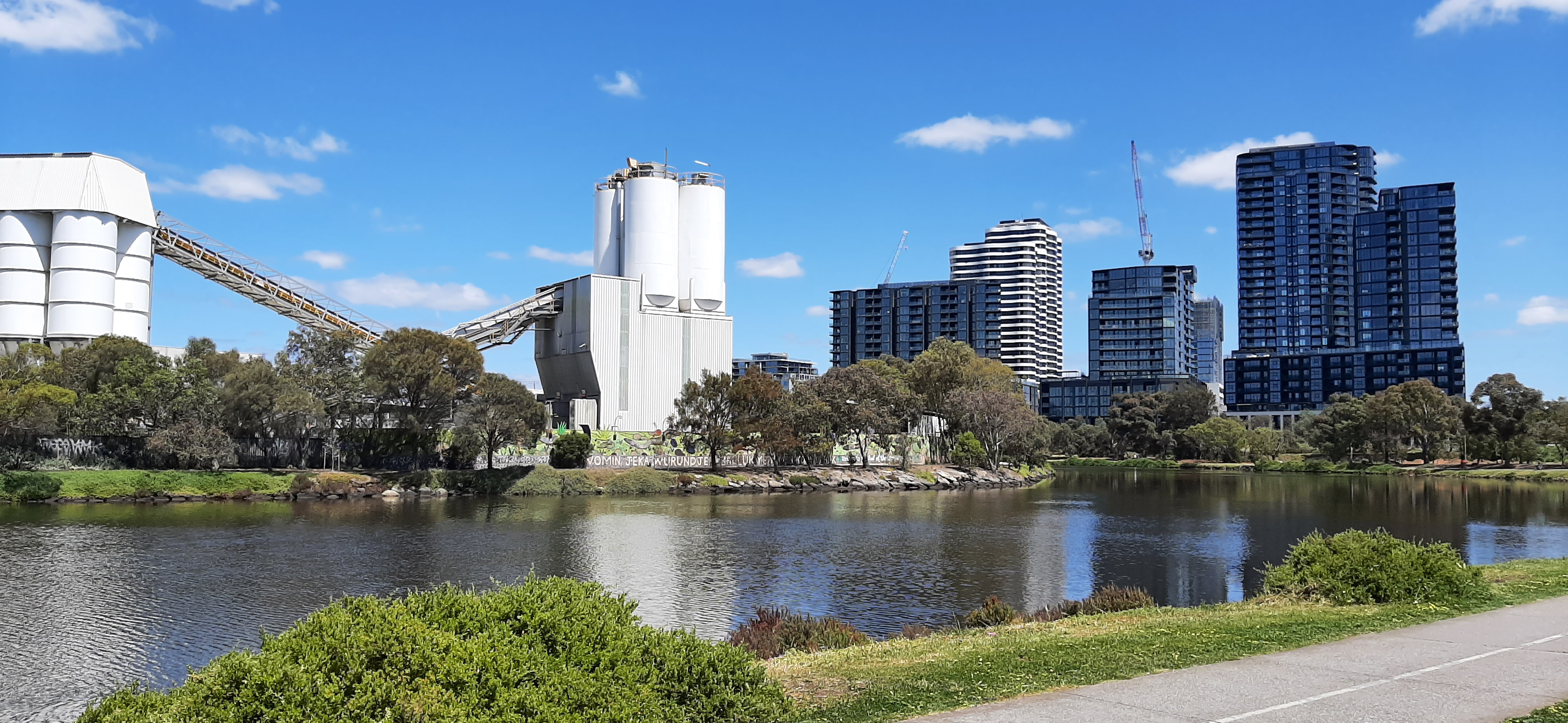
- Looking towards the precinct, across the river, in 2021
- Interactive map of Footscray Wharves Precinct
- 37°48′05″S 144°54′30″E
- Type: Historic site comprising former: Wharves; factories; housing
- Location: Maribyrnong River west bank, Footscray, Melbourne, Victoria, Australia

History
- Earliest developments: 1839 (punt service)
- Founder: Melbourne Harbour Trust (wharves)
- Built: 1880s (wharves)
- Original use: Industry, transport, housing

Site notes
- Material: Timber (wharves)
- Public access: Yes

Victorian Heritage Register
- Official name: Saltwater River Crossing Site and Footscray Wharves Precinct
- Type: Registered place
- Designated: 11 December 1997
- Reference no.: H1397
- Heritage overlay no.: HO50

The Footscray Wharves Precinct, also known as the Saltwater River Crossing Site and Footscray Wharves Precinct, is an historical former working port, wharves, river crossing location, disused industrial site, and the location for early residential housing, situated on the west bank of the Maribyrnong River, located in Footscray, an inner-western suburb of Melbourne, in Victoria, Australia. The site contains significant archaeological remains which illustrate the colonial development of the area in terms of the presence of public houses, residences and intensive industry.

Located on the traditional lands of the Wurundjeri Woi Wurrung and the Bunurong people, the precinct was added to the Victorian Heritage Register on 11 December 1997 in recognition of its historical, archaeological and social importance. Various other elements of the site were added to non-statutory heritage lists, including the bluestone steps on the wharf.

Since the early 2020s, the Victorian Government and City of Maribyrnong have redeveloped some of the site for community use and increasingly high-density residential apartments.

== Location ==
The precinct is located on the west bank of the Maribyrnong River, running south from Hopkins Street, and bounded by Moreland, Bunbury, Wingfield, Napier, and Maribyrnong streets. Included in the site are a number of significant above ground structures including the red brick construction associated with the Michaelis Hallenstein tannery operation, two bluestone cottages in Bunbury Street, the former Schwartz Boathouse and Henderson House, the latter also listed on the Victorian Heritage Register. Elements of the heritage curtail are located on the river's edge.

== History ==
The site has a close association with the earliest stages of the history of colonial Victoria, and was the 1803 location for Charles Grimes, the Acting Surveyor-General, to land ashore.

Known as the Saltwater River until 1913, the Maribyrnong River was a major transport route in the colonised District of Port Phillip. Prior to 1939, the only crossing of the river was at a ford located at what is now known as Avondale Heights. In 1839 a punt service was established to cross the river near its junction with the Yarra for travellers from Melbourne to access Williamstown, Geelong, and beyond. A settlement evolved around the punt's western shore that became known as Footscray, although it was initially called Saltwater.

Industrialisation of the area commenced from the 1840s, including abattoirs, piggeries, tanneries, and the production of tallow for candles and soap. By the 1860s and 1870s, the Footscray area attracted a range of industries that clustered along the river bank, and was a source of employment for those who settled west of the river. In the 1880s, the Melbourne Harbour Trust extended an existing timber wharf to support industrial growth—including fertiliser and chemical production —that continued throughout most of the nineteenth and first half of the twentieth centuries. During this period, the river's water quality was subject to severe environmental degradation. A decline in the manufacturing industry followed in the 1960s and 1970s and subsequently, following rehabilitation of the precinct, the former industrial areas along the river were redeveloped into high-density residential areas, or preserved for heritage.

== Description ==
As an early transport node, the precinct illustrates the historical development of the Port Phillip District and the relationship between the provision of transport facilities, the establishment of public houses and wharves, the expansion of maritime transport, the development of heavy industry, and the founding of the settlement of Footscray, including residential development. Notable structures that are retained in the precinct include Henderson House, cottages on Bunbury Street, Schwartz's Boathouse and parts of the former Michaelis Hallenstein Tannery. An historical rail spur line, to support industrial development, was built alongside the western banks of the river in 1917.

The area went into decline in the interwar period. After World War II, most of the vacant allotments were filled with factories and workshops and families left for other less-polluted areas, some renting their houses. During this period all the hotels in the area were delicensed and subsequently demolished or incorporated into factory developments.

=== Wharves ===
When the Melbourne Harbour Trust was constituted to manage the Port of Melbourne in 1877, it assumed responsibility for the Saltwater River as far as Hopkins Street. In 1878, the Trust extended an existing 37-metre (122 ft) timber wharf on the western bank of the river to 183 metres (600 ft) and installed sheet piling, filled with silt and metal by-products from the adjacent industries. The wharf was extended by 61 metres (200 ft) a year later and to 281 metres (922 ft) by 1881. Additionally, the Trust dredged part of the river to accommodate the vessels accessing the wharves.

=== Hotels ===
The Victoria Hotel, on or near the corner of Bunbury and Maribyrnong Streets, was the first public house in the area, opened in November 1840 on the river's western bank, licensed to B. G. (Benjamin Goldsmid) Levien, who also took out the first pastoral lease, and operated a punt service between West Melbourne until 1845. The hotel was rebuilt as the Ship Inn until 1917, and it was demolished in 1970. By the late 1850s there were three hotels operating near the river crossing at Footscray. The hotels serviced travellers and workers employed at boat and ship repair works in floating docks on the eastern side of the river opposite the Ship Inn in the 1850s and the river crossing at Footscray was described as a scene of 'bustle and activity' in the 1860s.

=== Industry ===
Slaughter houses, boiling down works, and meat processing works were established in the area from the 1840s. Henderson's piggery was constructed for Samuel Henderson in 1872-1873. The complex of buildings included a factory for bacon and ham curing and a residence. Isaac Hallenstein purchased a tannery on the north side of Hopkins Street in 1864. After his uncle Moritz Michaelis joined him in business, the tannery site extended to the southern side of Hopkins Street, facing the river.

Former piggery and tannery factories

Henderson constructed a large brick and stone premises in 1872 for his Bacon and Ham Curing Establishment, yet he only operated it for a short time. Wooden cottages on the site were rented to labourers until c. 1899. The stone house was also rented and the factory lay unused until 1901 when a meat preserving works operated until 1915. The house, factory, stables and land were acquired by Swallow and Ariel in 1921 and used the site until the late 1950s, at which time the bluestone house ceased to be used as a residence. The factory buildings and stables were demolished in 1969. The site, together with Henderson's House and part of the curing works are extant, and were purchased by the City of Footscray in 1981 and repurposed for use by Footscray Community Arts.

Isaac Hallenstein established a tannery to the north of Hopkins Street in 1864. He was joined in the business by a nephew, Moritz Michaelis and between them they created a successful business with branches in London, Sydney and New Zealand. In 1901 they purchased all the land north of Kepert's Tannery and the Bridge Hotel. They constructed a brick electric power plant in Maribyrnong Street, north of the Bridge Hotel but left the remainder of the site undeveloped until after World War I. The company's leather department is listed on the site from 1911 onwards, to the south of Hopkins Street. A 1906 description of the tannery refers to it as the largest in the southern hemisphere, occupying a site of c.two-hectare (five-acre). Further developments were made during the 1920s and 1930s until the 1980s when the entire site was transferred to the City of Footscray in 1984.

=== Dwellings ===
Margaret Pickett Cottages

Very few houses appear to have been constructed within the area during the early years of town formation in Footscray. A scattering of houses were constructed near the Bridge Hotel in Maribyrnong Street during the 1860s and 1870s, and in Moreland and Maribyrnong Streets to the north of the public reserve. William Picket purchased the two blocks along the southern side of Wingfield street in 1850 and in 1872 William Picket jnr sold both allotments to his widowed mother. Two houses were built on the Maribyrnong Street frontage of Allotment 8 in the mid 1870s by Margaret Picket. They were later owned by two prominent local councillor-businessmen, William Mitchell and David Newell. They were demolished in the 1897-98. Allotment 9, which had previously contained the Picket family home, is recorded as vacant land from 1882 until post-WWI.

Bunbury Street cottages

Prior to the 1880s the site contained very few residences. The boom of the 1880s however led to increased land subdivision and house building. For the most part the new homes were timber built, single-storey detached houses on large allotments. Generally residences were confined to a Moreland Street pocket, running south from Bunbury Street.

Schwartz residence and boathouse

Until after the turn of the century the only structures north of the Stanley Arms Hotel were the Schwartz family home and boatshed off Bunbury and Maribyrnong Streets. Schwartz and his partner were contractors for the Melbourne Harbor Trust's 1890 wharfage expansion program. After his death the property was subdivided and sold, the boatshed was bought by the owner of the Stanley Arms Hotel and was to later become a drill hall, then workshop for John R. Bell and Company. The former boatshed was not destroyed as part of the Ship Inn demolition and remains intact.

Other dwellings

The large middle block between Wingfield and Bunbury Street remained vacant land through most of this period. In the mid-1880s a pair of stone row houses was built at the corner of Bunbury and Moreland streets. They were occupied by tenants until 1899 when they were bought by Louis Benjamin, the then Hallenstein's tannery manager. He lived there until the 1920s. The industrial encroachment finally encompassed the cottages and the buildings were incorporated into a factory complex.

== See also ==
- Architecture of Melbourne
- Port of Melbourne
- History of Melbourne
- List of places on the Victorian Heritage Register in the City of Maribyrnong
