= Footscray Primary School =

Primary school in Melbourne, Victoria, Australia

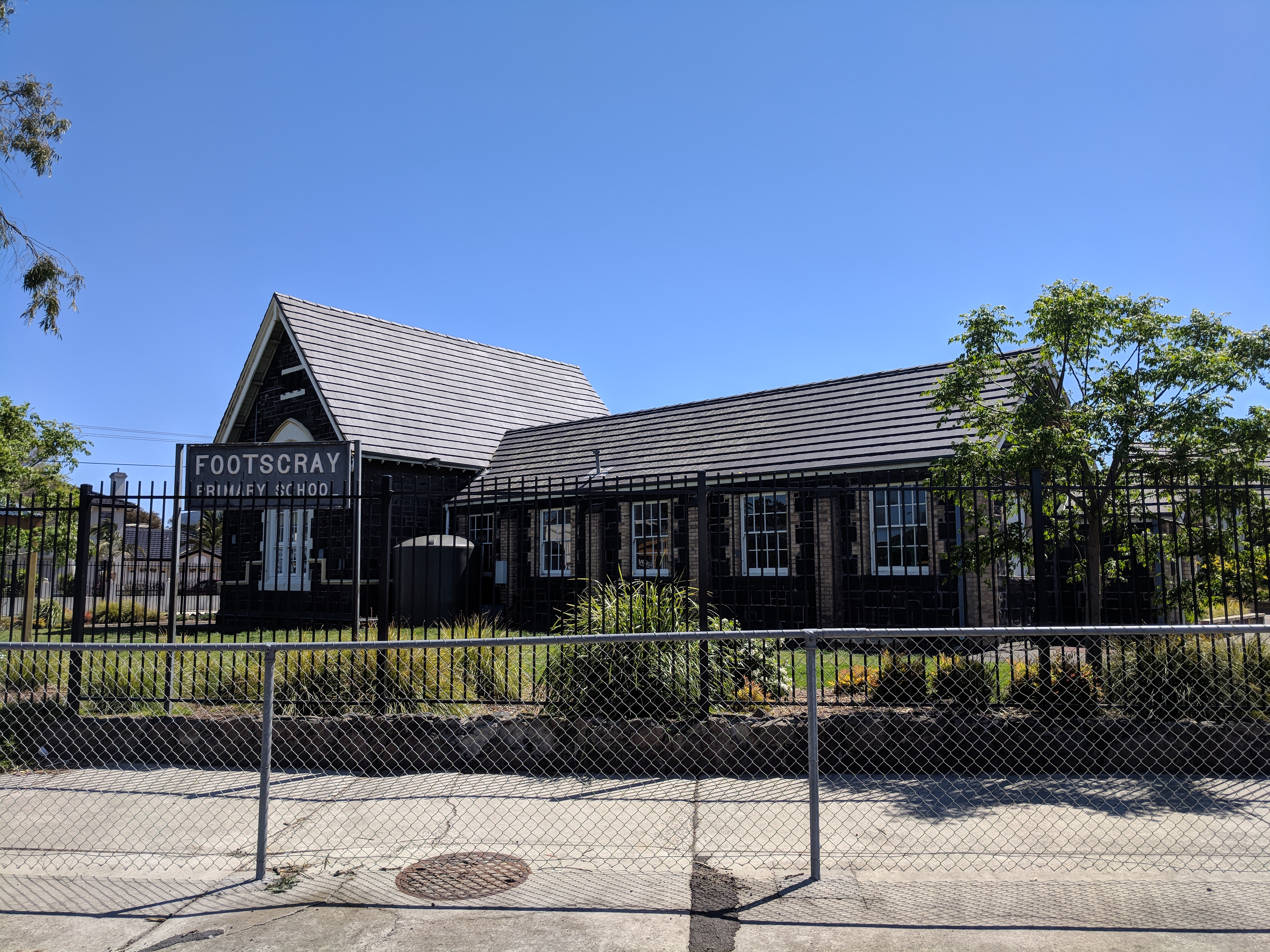
- The school in 2018

Location
- Footscray, Melbourne, Victoria; Australia; 37°47′54″S 144°53′33″E

Information
- Type: Public primary school
- Established: 1860; 166 years ago
- Principal: Jenny Briggs
- Teaching staff: 20 (FTE)
- Grades: Foundation–Year 6
- Enrolment: 343 (2024)
- Campus type: Suburban
- Website: footscrayps.vic.edu.au

History
- Built: 1864–1868 (Common School); 1881 (Main School); 1911 (Infants School)

Site notes
- Material: Bluestone, timber, red brick
- Architects: Henry Robert Bastow (1881); George William Watson (1911)
- Architectural style: Edwardian Baroque

Victorian Heritage Register
- Official name: Primary School No. 253
- Type: Registered place
- Designated: 20 August 1982
- Reference no.: H1713
- Heritage overlay no.: HO26
- Category: Education

Register of the National Estate
- Official name: Footscray State School No 253
- Type: Defunct register
- Designated: 21 March 1978
- Reference no.: 5475

The Footscray Primary School is a public co-educational primary school located at 100 Geelong Road, in Footscray, an inner western suburb of Melbourne, in Victoria, Australia. Administered by the Victorian Department of Education, the school has been in continuous operation since 1860 and, as of 2024, had 343 students enrolled.

The school, including its buildings made of local bluestone erected from 1864 and completed in 1868 and 1881 and its 1911 red brick building, was added to the Victorian Heritage Register on 20 August 1982 in recognition of its social, historical and architectural significance; and was added to the non-statutory lists of the now defunct Register of the National Estate on 21 March 1978 and the City of Maribyrnong on an unknown date.

== History ==
Footscray Primary School No. 253 was opened as a National School on 13 August 1860 (Note: Date as sourced from the Victorian Heritage Register. The Victorian Government Schools Directory states that the school commenced on 1 January 1862. However, the narrative at this site states that the school opened in 1860.) in a single wooden classroom, with 57 students enrolled. A detached bluestone classroom was constructed from 1864-65, completed in 1868, and operated as a Common School until the Education Act of 1872 came into operation. The school catered for a poor but settled population. The parents of the children were mostly "quarrymen, stone-breakers and general labourers". By the time the 1881 bluestone building was built, the school population had changed from the children of small farmers, contractors and quarrymen to the children of factory workers; and enrolments had increased to 240 students.

In 1901, Prince George, as Duke and Princess Mary, as Duchess of York visited the school; in 1911, an Infants' school red brick building was added on the north-east corner of the site; and by 1922, enrolments had increased to 1,874 students. In 1970, the school reverted to a primary school.

Further enhancements were made to the school between 2020 and 2023, including a covered outdoor learning area and a two-storey learning hub. The improvements helped to add an extra 200 enrolment places at the school for local students.

== Description ==
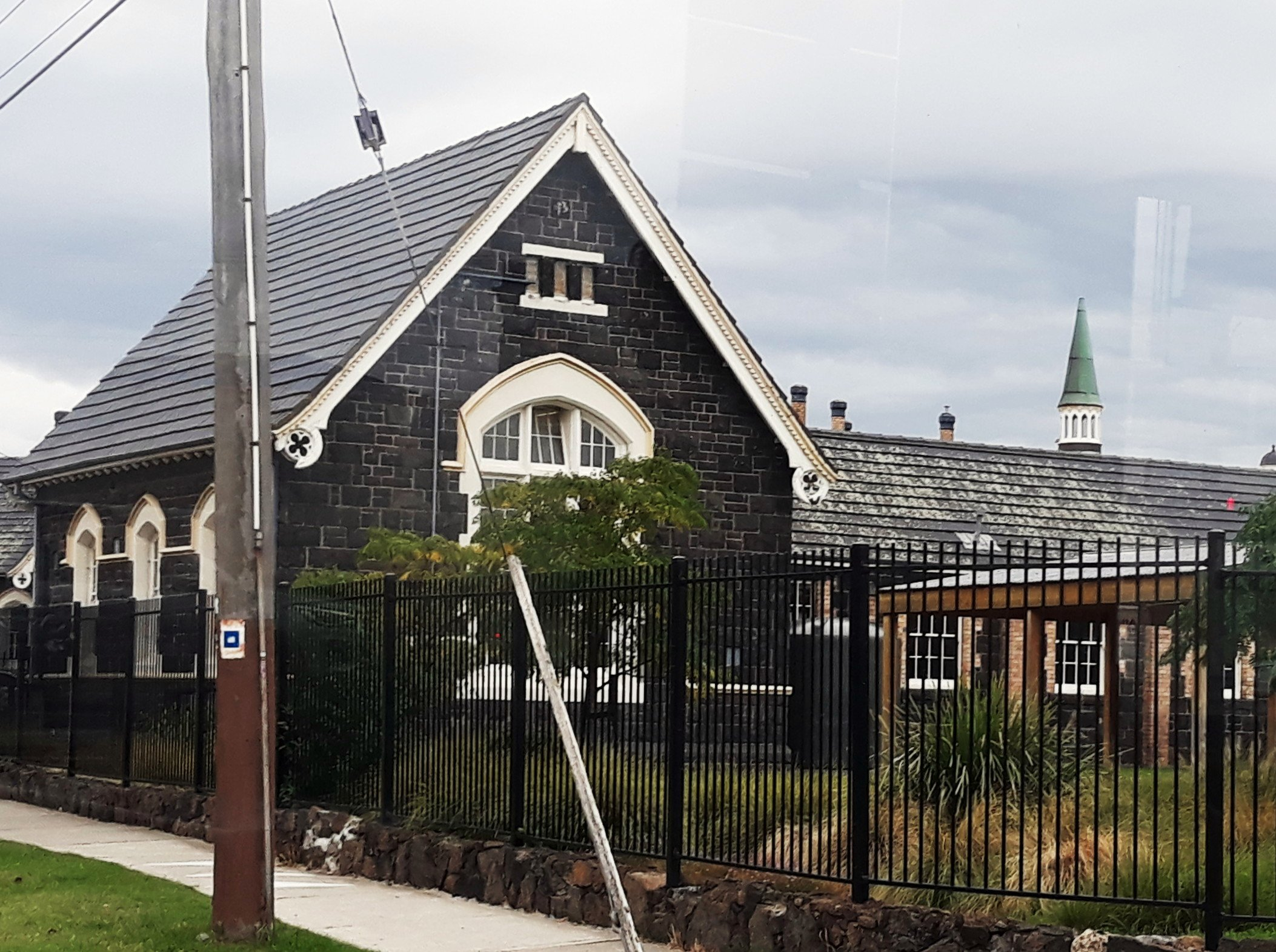
A view of one of the heritage-listed bluestone buildings

The 1868 bluestone building, as well as the separate 1881 building, survive on the site. The 1868 Common School is constructed of bluestone with brick quoining and consists of two classrooms. The 1881 main school building, designed by the Public Works Department under the supervision of Henry Robert Bastow, is also constructed of bluestone and has a prominent entry with a verandah and turret office containing a bell-tower.

The Infants' building, designed by George William Watson in the pavilion style—an Edwardian design adopted by the Public Works Department for Infants' buildings constructed between 1907 and 1915—is constructed of red brick, was completed in 1911, and has a central hall with classrooms around. The main hall has a polished timber hammer beam roof and leadlight windows depicting Australian birds.

The Footscray Primary School is of social and historical importance as it was associated with the provision of education from the Common School period of 1862-72, as well as under the Education Act of 1872. Its bluestone construction in both the Common School and the Education Department phases is linked with the growth of Footscray and is an example of the way local sources of building material were used before the improvements in transport in Victoria gave access to greater diversity of materials. The intactness of the whole school site at Footscray is enhanced by the presence of the Common School, the main building of 1881, and the detached Infants' school building of 1911. There are few school sites that demonstrate so clearly the sequence of development from 1864 and this may be linked with the growth of the suburb of Footscray and the history of an industrial inner suburb of Melbourne.

The Footscray Primary School demonstrates the development from the 1860s, through to the more modern era. Details of particular note are the mural painted in the main classroom of the 1868 Common School building and the elaborate verandah and turret at the entry to the 1881 bluestone building. The Infants' building retains its characteristic details including elaborate ceiling and leadlight windows and exterior hexagonal roof ventilators.

== Demographics ==
In 2024, English was an additional language for 20 per cent of its students. Located in an area historically known for its Italian heritage, the school delivers an Italian language bilingual education program where the Victorian Curriculum is delivered 50 per cent in Italian and 50 per cent in English.

== See also ==
- Education in Victoria
- List of government schools in Victoria, Australia
- List of places on the Victorian Heritage Register in the City of Maribyrnong
