= The Pebbles (house) =

House in Melbourne, Victoria, Australia

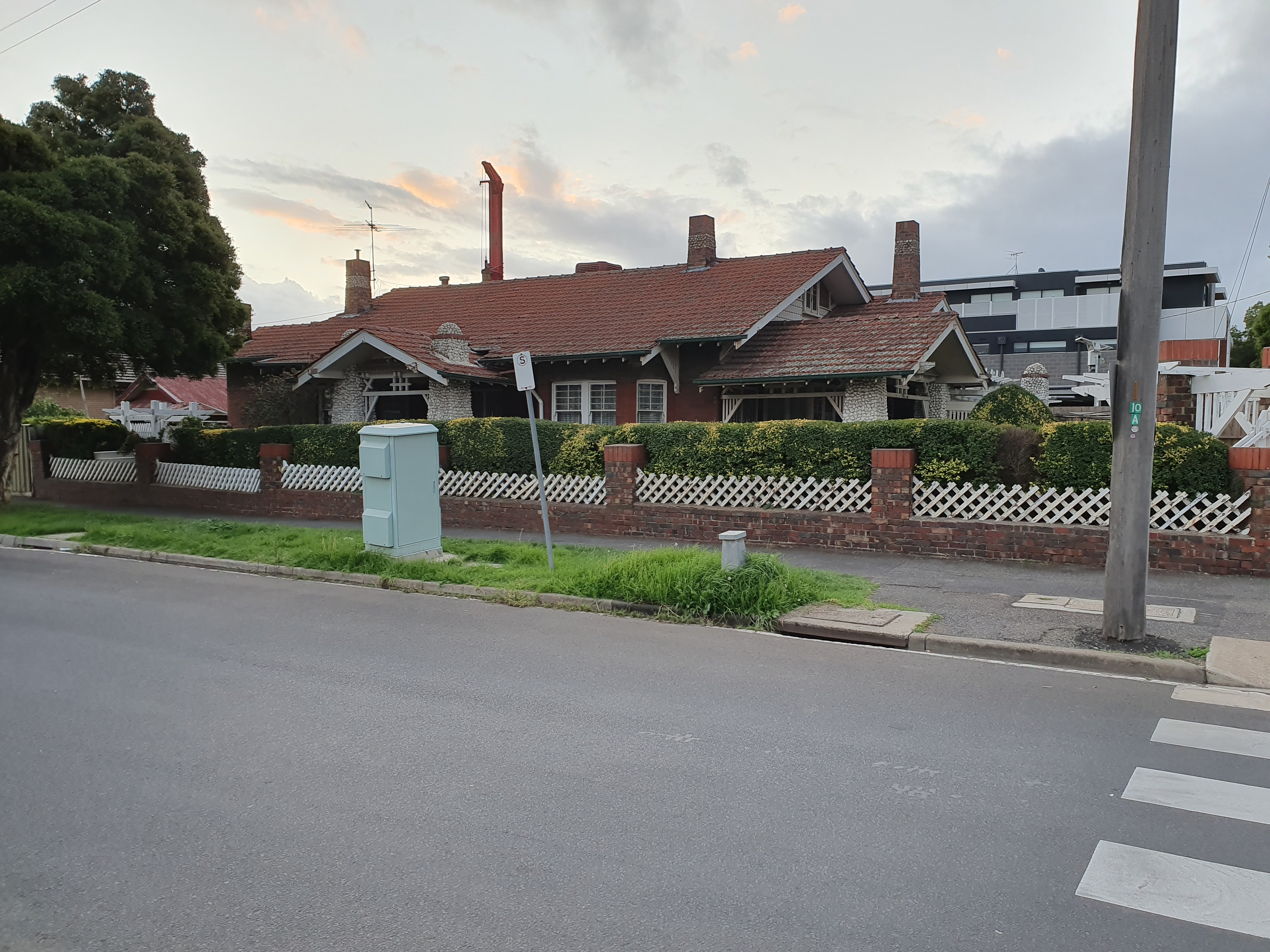
- The house in 2020

- Location within Melbourne

General information
- Status: Completed
- Type: House
- Architectural style: Federation California bungalow
- Location: 57A Droop Street, Footscray, Melbourne, Victoria, Australia
- Coordinates: 37°47′47″S 144°53′47″E
- Completed: 1920; 106 years ago
- Client: Francis George Whitehill

Technical details
- Material: Red brick; cedar and other timbers; crushed quartz pebbles; terra cotta

Design and construction
- Architecture firm: Schreiber and Jorgenson

Victorian Heritage Register
- Official name: The Pebbles
- Type: Registered place
- Designated: 16 October 1997
- Reference no.: H1308
- Heritage overlay on.: HO35
- Category: Residential buildings (private)

The Pebbles is a house located at 57A Droop Street, on the corner of Geelong Road, in Footscray, an inner-western suburb of Melbourne, in Victoria, Australia. The house was built in 1920 and is an early and intact example of the popular Australian adaption of the California bungalow style in suburban Melbourne.

The property was added to the Victorian Heritage Register on 16 October 1997 in recognition of its architectural significance; having been added to non-statutory heritage lists by the Victorian branch of the National Trust on 3 September 1987 and the City of Maribyrnong on an unknown date.

== History ==
The Pebbles was designed by architects Schreiber and Jorgenson and commissioned by Francis George Whitehill, who occupied the dwelling from the time of construction in 1920 until about 1930. Whitehill, a former dairy farmer, was one of three members of the same family who became property developers.

== Description ==
The Pebbles is a Californian bungalow of red brick with rough cast and cedar shingles to the gable ends, and large crushed quartz "pebbles" as decorative elements in the verandah piers, chimney, and infill panels to the fence. There is also extensive use of timber in the pergola gateway, pergola, and verandah brackets. its design has significant Japanese-style timber detailing and joinery.

The Pebbles is of importance for its design excellence, being one of Victoria's best and most distinctive suburban Californian bungalows. It presents bold elevations to two street frontages and displays a wide variety of typical bungalow elements including low pitched gabled roof and distinctive roof forms with widely overhanging eaves, squat piers decorated with pebbles supporting the verandah roofs, and use of shingling and roughcast. The extensive use of timber and unusual internal and external joinery details highlight the Japanese influence on bungalow design. Of particular note are the fireplaces, and timber work in the entry hall, dining room and sitting room. The Pebbles is complete with its original fence and pergola gateway.

Inside there is much more of the timber detail but with a French polish and in a highly fretted form, each ornamental portal framing the path from one large space to another. Unlike the usual Bungalow plan which has a hall opening via glazed double doors into the adjacent receiving rooms, The Pebbles' main rooms communicate directly with the hall, the ornate timber screen being the only division.

== See also ==
- Architecture of Melbourne
- List of places on the Victorian Heritage Register in the City of Maribyrnong
