= Footscray, Victoria =

Footscray
- Suburb
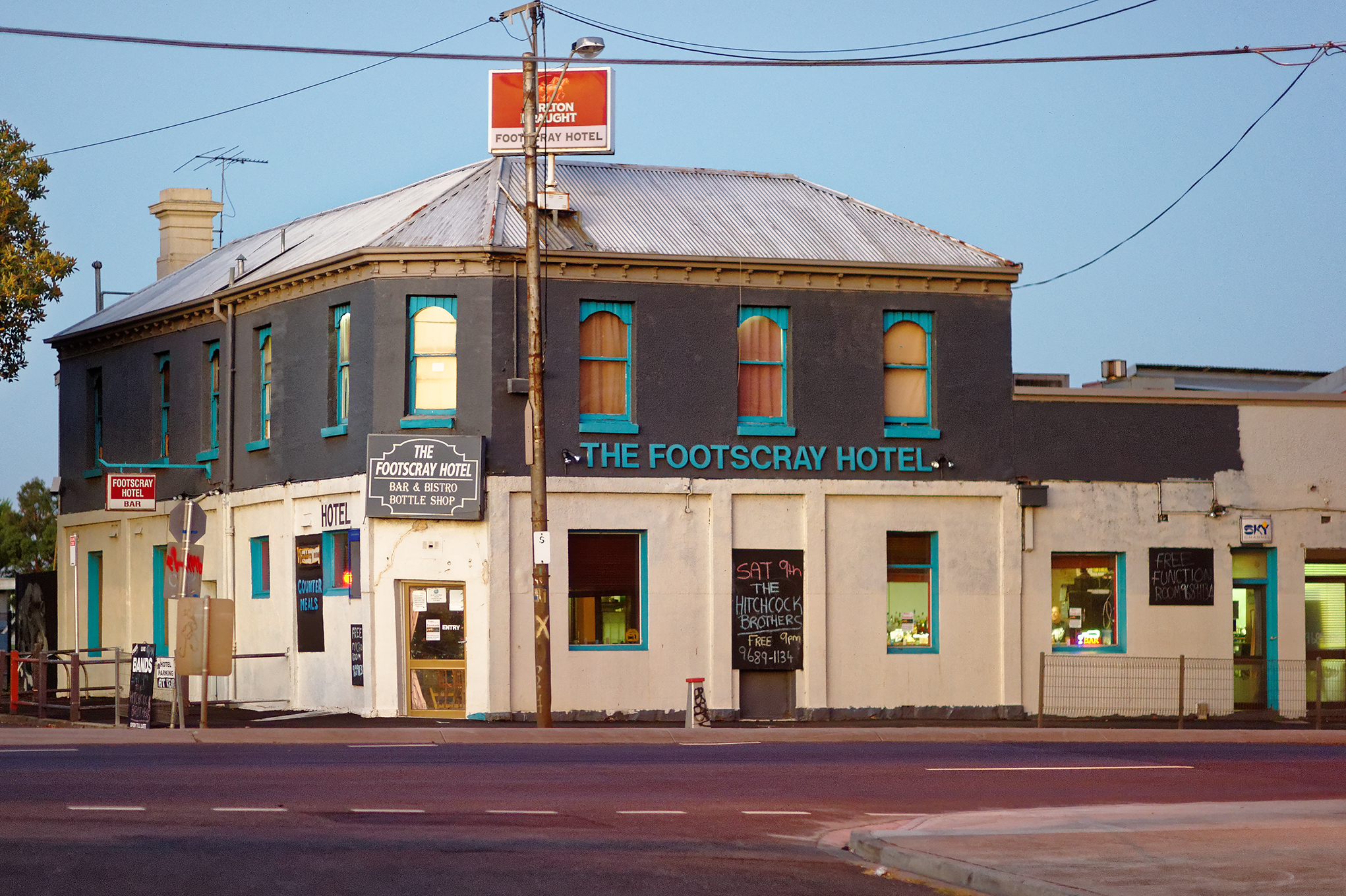
- The Footscray Hotel on Hopkins Street

- Interactive map of Footscray
- Coordinates: 37.80°S 144.90°E
- Country: Australia
- State: Victoria
- City: Melbourne
- LGA: City of Maribyrnong
- Location: 5 km (3.1 mi) from Melbourne

Government
  - State electorate: Footscray
  - Federal division: Fraser

Area
  - Total: 5 km^{2} (1.9 sq mi)
- Elevation: 25 m (82 ft)

Population
  - Total: 17,131 (2021 census)
  - Density: 3,400/km^{2} (8,900/sq mi)
- Postcode: 3011
Suburbs around Footscray
Maidstone	Maribyrnong	Flemington
West Footscray	Footscray	West Melbourne
Kingsville	Seddon	Yarraville

Footscray (/ˈfʊtskreɪ/ FUUT-skray) is an inner-city suburb in Melbourne, Victoria, Australia, 5 km (3.1 mi) west of Melbourne's Central Business District, located within the City of Maribyrnong local government area and its council seat. Footscray recorded a population of 17,131 at the 2021 census.

Footscray is characterised by a very diverse, multicultural central shopping area, which reflects the successive waves of immigration experienced by Melbourne, and by Footscray in particular. Once a centre for Greek, Italian and former Yugoslavian migrants, it later became a hub for Vietnamese and East African immigrants in Melbourne. It has recently begun to undergo rapid development and gentrification, and Time Out magazine placed Footscray at 13th in its "50 Coolest Neighbourhoods in the World" for 2019, reflecting its evolving reputation, citing in particular its diverse array of international cuisine, bars and nightlife, as well as its arts scene.

Footscray is named after Foots Cray, on the River Cray in London, England.

== History ==
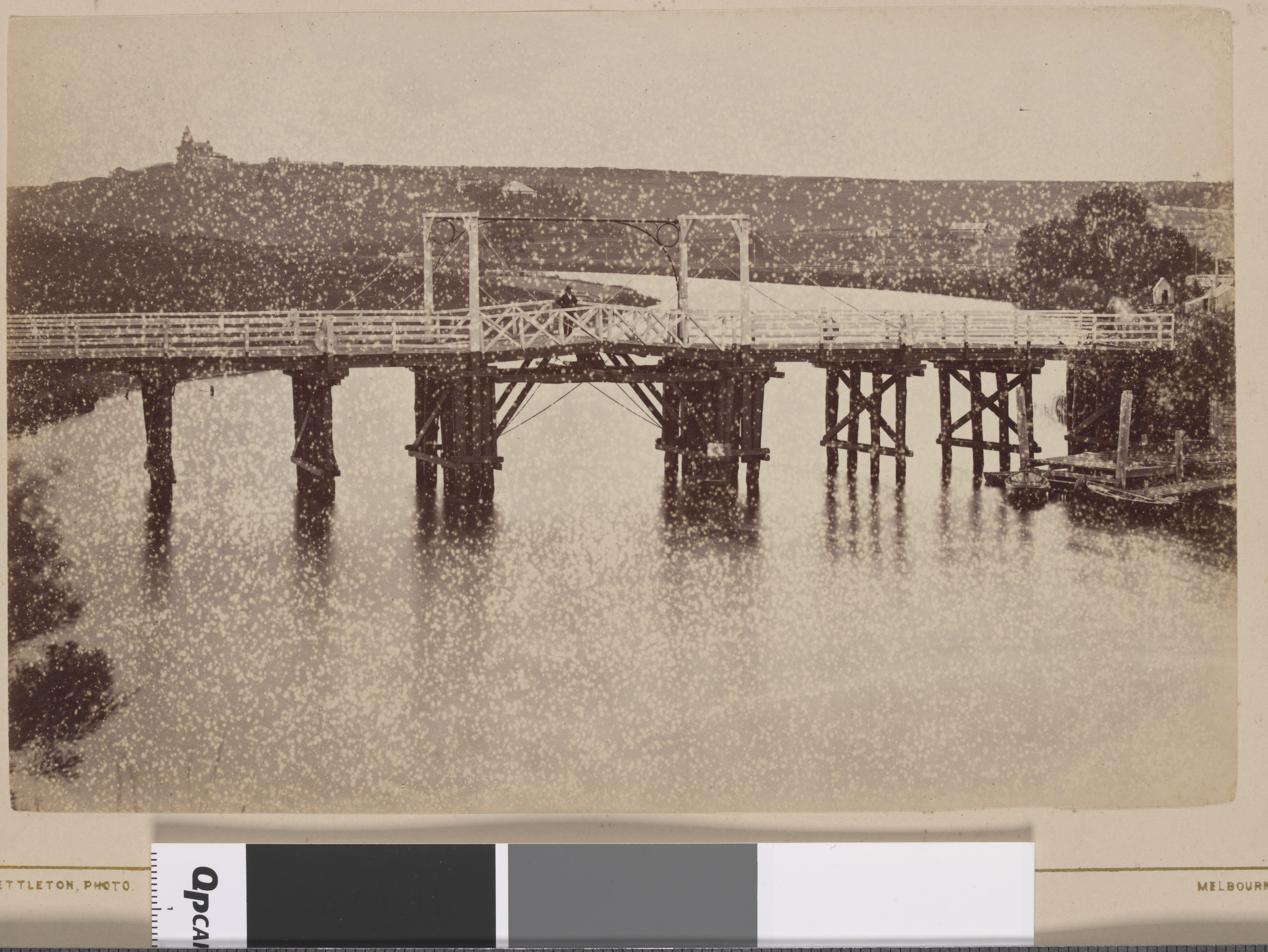
A bridge over the Maribyrnong River, with a man standing in the middle of the movable section

Footscray is part of the City of Maribyrnong and was built largely on the traditional lands of the Kulin nation.

For thousands of years, Footscray was the meeting place of the lands of the Yalukit-willam, the Marin-balluk, and the Wurundjeri people. Koories stalked game, collected food and fished along the river junction, estuaries, swamps, and lagoons. Within Melbourne's western region, the Marin-balug and Kurung-jand-balug clans of the Woiwurrung cultural group, and the Yalukit-willam clan of the Boonwurrung cultural group shared the luscious resources around the Maribyrnong Valley.

The first European to visit the area was Charles Grimes in 1803. A park, where he landed, is named after him at Napier St.

In 1839 a punt (cable ferry) was built on the Maribyrnong River, it was the only connecting link between Melbourne and Geelong, Ballarat, Castlemaine and Bendigo. The Punt Hotel opened three years later and was the first building in the area. During the first decade drovers transporting cattle and sheep provided the only business at the hotel. After 1851, when gold was discovered out west, the pub did a roaring trade with diggers. Part of the old pub still stands and it has been renamed The Pioneer.

The Post Office first opened on 12 October 1857.

Footscray was declared a municipality in 1859 with a population of 300 and 70 buildings. Around the same year the first bridge was built across Saltwater (now Maribyrnong) River.

Between 1881 and 1891 Footscray's population more than tripled from almost 6,000 to 19,000.

Between around 1916 and 1940, Burn Brae Private Hospital existed on Ballarat Road. Many babies were born there, including actor Leslie Dayman in 1933.

Footscray developed into an industrial zone in the second half of the nineteenth century, with the manufacturing industry beginning to decline in the 1960s and 70s.

Along the Footscray–Yarraville riverfront, the Cuming, Smith & Co. acid and superphosphate works at Yarraville and a second acid-fertiliser plant established by the Mount Lyell company on the west bank of the Yarra formed a nucleus of the area's heavy-chemical industry for decades. Cuming, Smith & Co.’s operations intersected with Footscray's civic and transport networks; in 1898 the firm sought Footscray Council support to resolve rail goods congestion affecting its Yarraville works.

Industrialist James Cuming Sr. served as mayor of Footscray in 1891 and was a prominent local benefactor; he also served as president of the Footscray Football Club from 1895 to 1911. A marble bust by Margaret Baskerville, commissioned by public subscription, was originally unveiled at the Railway Reserve in Napier Street, Footscray, then relocated to Yarraville Gardens; it was restored and rededicated on 21 October 2001.

The Footscray Magistrates' Court closed on 1 February 1985.

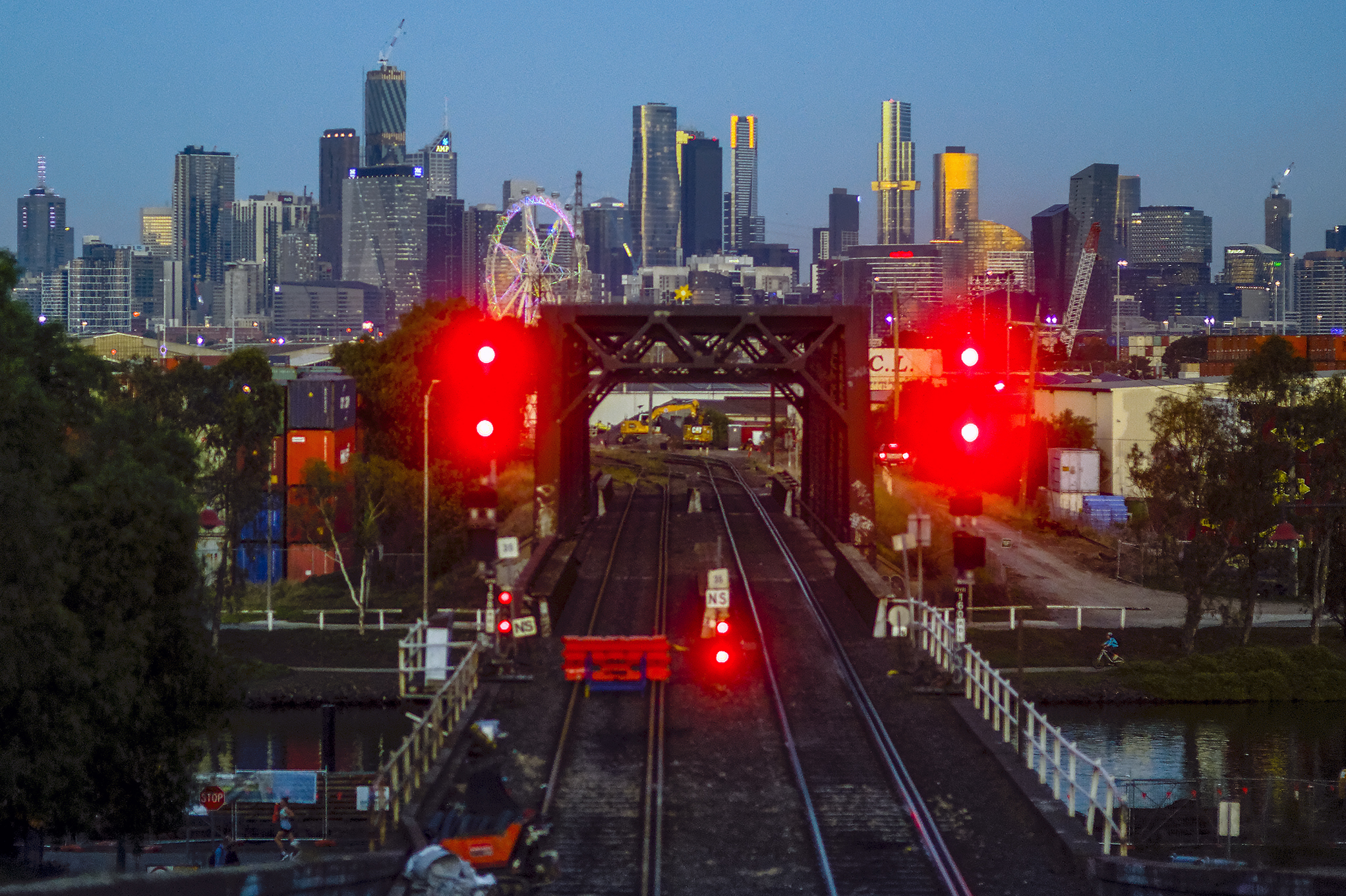
Looking east towards the City of Melbourne from Footscray

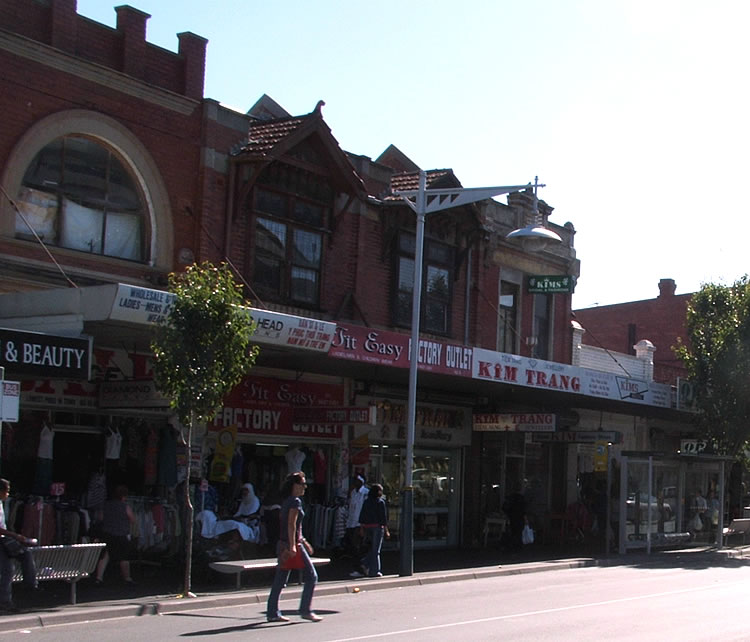
Paisley Street in central Footscray

== Demographics ==
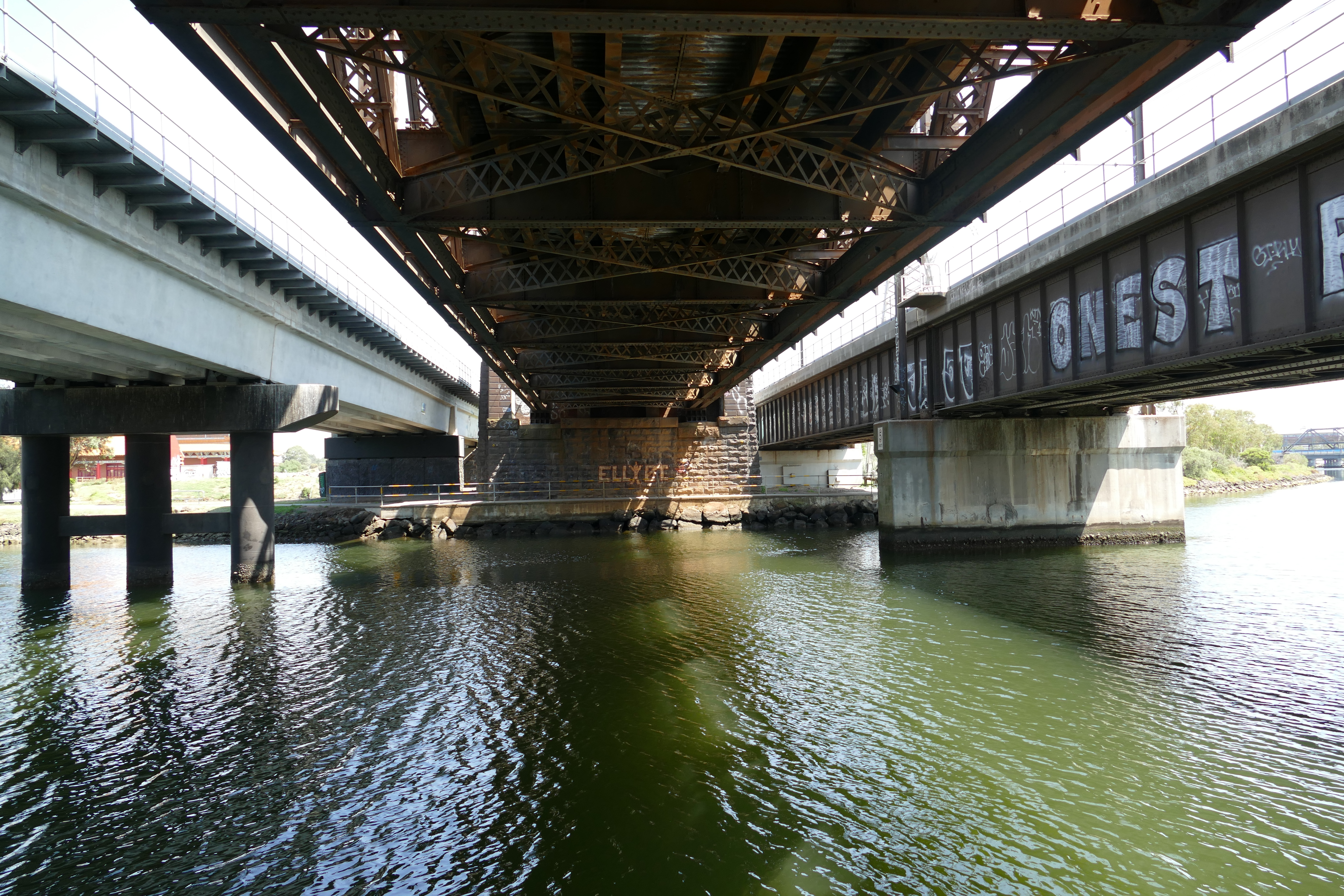
Railway bridges, with the Saltwater River Rail Bridge in the middle, across the Maribyrnong River, 2020

In 2011, Footscray's 13,193 residents came from 135 countries.

In the 2021 census, just over half the population (50.9%) was born in Australia, the main countries of overseas origin are Vietnam (8.5%), India (4.7%), England (2.2%), China (2.2%) and New Zealand (2.0%). With increasing gentrification, the number of Anglo-Celtic Australians has steadily increased in Footscray with neighbouring West Footscray seeing an even more drastic shift. In 2021, the Australian-born population had increased to 50.9%, with Vietnam and India as the most prominent places of birth overseas.

As of 2021, the median age of people living in Footscray was 34.

Maribyrnong Council predicts a population boom will more than double Footscray resident numbers from 14,100 to 30,500 by 2031, requiring about 7,000 new dwellings.

== Politics ==
The suburb's historical voting patterns have been fairly typical of a working-class suburb with a high migrant population. Consistent with other inner-city electorates in Melbourne, and other state capitals, voter support for the Australian Greens has increased in recent years.

=== Federal ===
Footscray is located in the federal electorate of Fraser, which has been represented by Daniel Mulino of the Labor since a redistribution prior to the 2022 federal election.

One third of voters at the Central Footscray booth voted for The Greens in the 2010 federal election, almost doubling their percentage of the primary vote in one election cycle. At the same election, Labor won Gellibrand, part of which included Footscray, with 59 per cent of the primary vote. The Lib/Nat parties received 23 per cent of the primary vote, whilst The Greens saw a swing of c. six per cent, with 15 per cent of the primary vote.

=== State ===
The state electorate of Footscray has been held by Labor's Katie Hall since 2018.

Footscray was a very safe state Labor seat, 65 per cent of the vote went to Labor at the 2014 state election. The Greens received 17 per cent of the primary vote in Footscray at the 2014 state election. In the 2022 state election, Labor's vote dropped significantly, with a 14 per cent swing towards the Greens and Labor's primary vote falling to 43 per cent.

=== Local ===
Footscray is part of the City of Maribyrnong, where the council for the 2024–28 term comprises three Greens, three Labor members, and one Independent.

Janet Rice of The Greens was elected to Maribyrnong Council in 2003, re-elected in 2005 and then elected mayor in 2006. Whilst mayor, Janet had a mayoral bike instead of a car. The first Vietnamese female mayor was Mai Ho, from 1997 to 1998. Mai Ho arrived in Australia in December 1982 with two small daughters and sixteen dollars. By 1997 she was the mayor of Maribyrnong.

Mohamed Semra was elected mayor in 2024, becoming the first mayor of Sub-Saharan African descent in Australia. Since 2026, he is serving as deputy mayor, with Bernadette Thomas as the mayor.

== Food ==
In 2013, there were over 130 restaurants in Footscray, including; 30 Vietnamese, 20 Indian, 17 Chinese and several others featuring Ethiopian, Australian, Croatian, Greek, Italian, Thai, Turkish, Sudanese and Japanese cuisines.

The Footscray Market is a large indoor fresh produce and seafood market, with 33 food stalls and 50 general stalls, catering particularly to the various ethnicities and local restaurants. It is located opposite Footscray railway station.

The Melbourne Wholesale Market on Footscray Road (often referred to as the Footscray Traders Market) moved to Epping in 2015.

Another large market in Footscray was Little Saigon, which opened in 1992 to cater to Asian population growth, but had customers from all backgrounds. Little Saigon was popular, and stocked a wide array of tropical fruits and Asian produce. However, this market was destroyed in a large fire on 13 December 2016, with more than $12 million worth of damage. As of 2021, plans to rebuild the market exist but do not appear to be in motion.

== Culture ==
Footscray has many 1930s Art Deco buildings, some of which are in disrepair and hidden behind shop signs and awnings.

=== Heritage listings ===
The following places in Footscray are listed on the Victorian Heritage Register:

- Barkly Theatre (former), at 277-287 Barkly Street
- Ercildoune, at 66 Napier Street
- Footscray Park, on Ballarat Road, a 15-hectare (37-acre) urban park that is one of the largest and most intact examples of an Edwardian park in Australia; characteristic features include rustic stonework, ornamental ponds and extensive use of palms.
- Footscray Primary School, at 100 Geelong Road
- Footscray railway station, on the corner of Irving and Hyde Streets
- Footscray Town Hall, also known as Maribyrnong Town Hall, at 61 Napier Street, the only American Romanesque civic building in Victoria; with an eclectic exterior mix of Art Deco, Moderne, Celtic, Spanish and Medieval styles.
- Footscray Wharves Precinct, incorporating the Saltwater River Crossing Site, on the west bank of the Maribyrnong River
- Henderson House, at 43-45 Moreland Street
- Kariwara District Scout Headquarters, at 4 Hyde Street
- Kinnears Ropeworks, at 124-188 Ballarat Road
- Saltwater River Rail Bridge, despite its name, across the Maribyrnong River, connecting with West Melbourne
- The Pebbles, at 57A Droop Street

=== Arts events and organisations ===
The leading arts organisation for the suburb is Footscray Community Arts, located within the Henderson house complex, on the bank of the river, at 43-45 Moreland Street.

The Women's Circus began at Footscray Community Arts Centre around 1991, and is now based at the historic Footscray Drill Hall, The Drill Hall is also home to the Snuff Puppets, a theatre company founded in 1992 that makes giant puppets. In 2013, the City of Maribyrnong ran a competition for a $170,000 public art installation, won by Vicki Couzens, Maree Clarke, and Jeph Neale that featured massive boulders which form a circle across the intersection at the southern end of the Footscray Mall, symbolising a coolamon, or welcome bowl. The work was installed in June 2013. Phoenix Youth Theatre opened in 2014 at Phoenix Youth Centre at 72 Buckley Street.

=== Music ===
Footscray has a rich history of music and brass bands, currently being home to the Footscray-Yarraville City Band – FYCB, which rehearses weekly and performs throughout the year locally, nationally and internationally. The FYCB conduct an annual Carols by Candlelight event each December in the Yarraville Gardens. They were the 2010 VBL State Champions.

The Hyde Street Youth Band, established in 1928, played the official theme song for the Footscray Football Club (now the Western Bulldogs) while they were playing at the Whitten Oval. The FYCB is one of five A-Grade Brass bands in Victoria and has been successful in the National Championships.

JABULA! – An African Community Choir, is run by Sudanese singer Ajak Kwai and percussionist Tawanda Gadzikwa. The choir brings together people from broad skill levels and diverse African heritages. The choir meets fortnightly on Saturdays at the Footscray Community Arts Centre.

=== Festivals ===
Emerge in the West 17 May 2015 in the City of Maribyrnong reveals emerging African arts, culture and small businesses that have been growing rapidly in Melbourne's West, marking the start of the week long Africa Day Celebrations in Melbourne.

Founded in 2011, this annual 'Emerge' event is an outcome of MAV's CCD program for emerging and refugee artists and communities, triggering the founding of the Australian-African Small Business Association in 2014 to represent the growing number of African restaurants and cafes in Melbourne's West.

The St Jerome's Laneway Festival is an annual block party held in partnership with the Footscray Community Arts Centre. 15,000 enjoyed the festival in 2015. More recently, the festival is held at Footscray Park.

The Western Bulldogs Community Festival and Family Day is held every summer on Whitten Oval.

Central Footscray Streets are closed for the all-day-long Chinese New Year celebrations organised by the Footscray Asian Business Association (FABA). The Quang Minh Tet Festival celebrations in neighbouring Braybrook were expanded.

The Big West started in 1997 as the Maribyrnong Arts Project (MAP) and it continued for two decades. Approximately 37,000 people attended in 2011. The last Big West Festival was in November 2015. In July 2016 the Big West board announced that the festival would no longer continue. An attempt by a local arts group to sustain the event failed.

== In popular culture ==
Footscray has been the setting of several Australian movies.

In 1992, the film Romper Stomper was set in and filmed in and around Footscray. It deals with a fictional gang of neo-Nazi skinheads and their battle against Vietnamese immigrants. Not all scenes were filmed locally: the "Footscray Railway Station" featured in the movie has a pedestrian underpass, while the real station has an overpass for foot traffic; the actual station used for filming was Richmond Station.

The 1994 film Metal Skin and the 2015 film Pawno are also set in and around Footscray.

The song Footscray Station by Melbourne band Camp Cope is about Footscray, where the lead singer and guitarist Georgia Maq, originally from Kew, resides.

Australian pop punk outfit Nö Class frequently reference Footscray in their lyrics, such as their 2018 hit Carry Me Home, which centres around the Footscray Hotel.

Melbourne band The Smith Street Band recorded the music video for their song 'Shine' as a homage to that of the music video of Its a Long Way to the Top (If You Wanna Rock 'n' Roll) by iconic Australian band AC/DC in the CBD of Footscray along Barkly Street.

== Community organisations ==
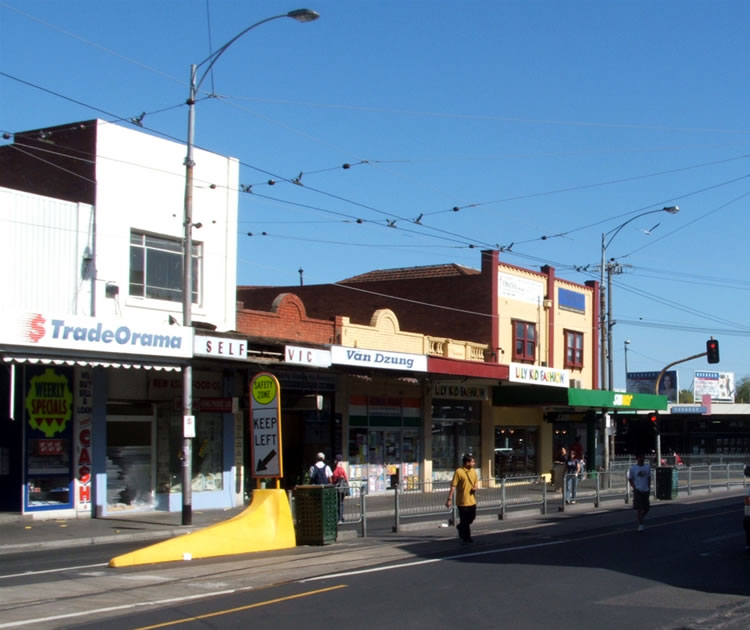
Footscray streetscape, prior to a multimillion-dollar street redevelopment in 2012

Asylum Seeker Resource Centre on Nicholson Street gives aid, welfare, and medical care for thousands of asylum seekers.

The Australian Croatian Association headquarters is located in Footscray, serving the large Croatian Community in the area. Other ethnic community, migrants and refugees groups with sites in Footscray include Albanian, Bosniak, Burmese, Chinese, Croatian, Ethiopian, Filipino, Greek, Hungarian, Italian, Macedonian, Polish, Russian, Latin American, Somali, Sudanese and Vietnamese.

The Footscray Club is a social club that has been part of Footscray since 1894. This was the original Footscray Cycle Club, when cycling became quite popular in Australia in the 19th century. By 1909, the club had built a permanent site on Paisley Street where it still stands today. Early in the 21st century the club evolved into a purely local social club where members of the local community meet and socialise.

The Footscray Historical Society works on a number of local fronts to record and preserve the history of the area. The Society has an active membership who take part in a range of activities to assist this endeavour. Records such as rare books, business records and correspondence are held at the Society's headquarters at Ercildoune, built in 1876 as a branch of the National Bank of Australasia. The Society owns this historic building and has had the interior and exterior restored. Tours, forums and discussions are held regularly.

Footscray is at the centre of the Kariwara Scout district of Scouts Australia. The word 'Kariwara' means 'West' in a local Aboriginal language. Started in 1909, the 1st Footscray Scout hall is a historic building next to the Footscray Police Station in Hyde Street. 3rd Footscray is the hall seen from the railway line and no longer has youth programs but is home to adult training. The 2nd Footscray Scout hall has a modern brick hall after the first hall burnt down in 1982. The group has programs for children aged 7 to 26 and meets at Guadion Park in Barkly Street. The 10th Footscray Scout group is in Essex Street next to the YMCA and has programs for 7- to 15-year-olds. The 5th Footscray group is opposite Seddon railway station and has programs for 6- to 15-year-olds. All are part of Scouts Australia.

Maribyrnong Truck Action Group and Less Trucks For Moore work towards cleaning the air in Footscray and surrounding suburbs.

Other groups include; Footscray Traders Association, Footscray Asian Business Association, Save Railway Place, Footscray Sings Fair Go for Footscray Rail Residents and Footscray Rotary.

== Town planning ==
The 'Liveable Melbourne' 2011 survey listed Footscray as the 37th-most-liveable suburb in Melbourne.

In 2008, the State Labor Government designated Footscray as one of six Central Activities Districts. Melbourne's CADs were given planning rules aimed at creating lively mixed use CBD-like districts. The area, according to the local mayor, 'would soon have the second-highest skyline outside the Melbourne CBD'.

Local Footscray real estate agent Darren Dean of Sweeney Estate Agents said one pocket of Footscray – bounded by Geelong Road, Ballarat Road, Victoria Street, the railway line and Moore Street – had been intended for "a mini Manhattan".

"There are cranes popping up in the skyline everywhere over here", he said.

Hoarding sign on a building

Examples of new real estate developments in Footscray include:

- Ovation, located at 94–104 Buckley Street
- Liberty One, located at 1 Warde Street
- Live City, located at 124–188 Ballarat Road
- Eldridge, located at 17 Eldridge Street

Examples of the changing face of Footscray include:

- In 2014, the Liberal State Planning Minister Matthew Guy approved a 28-storey tower next to the Maribyrnong River in Footscray.
- Nearly 9,000 additional dwellings were built in Footscray between 2006 and 2011.
- Grocon opened the $350 million 'McNab Avenue Development' with residential apartments, Government and commercial offices in 2014.
- The Banco Group turned the Footscray Plaza into a $45 million apartment block of ten stories, with the old retail space expanded.
- As part of the Footscray City Edge master plan, Maribyrnong Council plans to turn the Paisley Street carpark into a park.
- In 2012, a $500 million high-density residential and commercial development was approved for over the railway tracks near Footscray Station.
- In 2011, the iconic Little Saigon market was approved for a $70 million redevelopment with twin towers, holding 260 apartments and sky gardens.
- The 15-hectare (37-acre) 'Joseph Road Precinct' was approved for higher-density residential development in 2009. The tallest building approved for the area was a $90 million, 25-story apartment block with 222 apartments, construction was due to finish in 2013.
- In 2011, a new $6 billion suburb called E-Gate in West Melbourne was proposed by the state government on a 20-hectare (49-acre) site along Footscray Road.
- The long-abandoned Kinnears Rope Factory site on Ballarat Road could be turned into a mini-suburb for 2,500 people including high-rise apartments, increasing the number of homes in Footscray by more than a quarter.
- In 2011, $2 million was spent to revamp Leeds Street with wider footpaths, more trees and less access for cars.
- In 2010, as a part of the Victorian Government's $61.6 million Footscray railway station renewal program, significant improvements were complete to rail infrastructure.

=== Transport ===
Transport issues in Footscray included:

- Despite the revamping of Footscray, as of 2010, thousands of heavy trucks from nearby ports use the suburbs streets. Almost 3,000 trucks a day were recorded going down Buckley Street in central Footscray. Greens Mayor Cr Janet Rice helped get heavy trucks banned from Hopkins, Barkley, Irving, and Nicholson Streets in 2007. Truck bypass protesters from the MTAG have blockaded central Footscray roads during peak hour several times, the last blockade was on Moore St, April 2014. Protestors called for night and weekend truck curfews.
- The West Gate Distributor (Northern Section), part of a multimillion-dollar truck tollway between the port and the Westgate freeway, began construction in 2015. It became known as the West Gate Tunnel and was completed by 2024.
- Between 2011 and 2012 a planning study was conducted into building a multibillion-dollar tunnel under Footscray. The tunnel is part of a proposed East West Link toll road, in May 2013 the State Liberal Government pledged $300 million towards the eastern suburbs section of the $8 billion project. Contracts were later signed, however in June 2015 the Andrews Government opted to cancel them. As of August 2020 the project has not proceeded.
- Between 2009 and 2012 the former State Labor Government conducted route investigations and consultation to help identify options for removing trucks from local streets under the name 'Truck Action Plan', in August 2012 the ruling Liberal Government put this on hold and in May 2013 the plan was finally scrapped as the government claims it has been superseded by east–west link plans.
- The Maribyrnong Truck Action Group blockaded Shepherd Bridge in March 2013, demanding the state government fast-track work on linking the port with the West Gate Freeway.
- In 2013, the State and Federal Government spent $5 million investigating the possibility of a new interstate freight terminal in Truganina, which would reduce the daily number of trucks in the inner west from 20,000 to 18,000.
- Footscray railway station is the busiest non-CBD railway station in Melbourne, with 14,000 boardings per day.
- The $5 billion Regional Rail Link required the removal of 26 homes and 84 businesses in Central Footscray. As part of the Rail Link, the Nicholson Street bridge was rebuilt without retaining existing shops on the bridge. Some controversy occurred due to foot-traffic being exposed to fumes from the diesel trains below.
- In 2008 the Melbourne City Council recommended extending the 86 tram route to Footscray via Docklands.

== Sport ==
Aussie Rules Football

- Footscray is home of the Western Bulldogs Australian rules football club, which play in the Australian Football League. The team was formerly known as the Footscray Football Club until 1996, and played its home games at the Whitten Oval on Barkly Street, on the edge of Footscray. In 2014, competitive football returned to the club's home base with the re-introduction of the Footscray Bulldogs into the Victorian Football League (VFL) competition, who won the 2016 premiership. In addition, Footscray is also represented in the Western Region Football League by the West Footscray Roosters, the North Footscray Devils and the Parkside Magpies.

Basketball

- Footscray Hawks Basketball Club – after a decade break this club, once the biggest in Victoria, returned in 2011.

Canoeing

- Footscray Canoe Club, located at 40 Farnsworth Ave (corner of Maribyrnong Boulevard). Sessions usually run on Saturday or Sunday from 7.30am.

Cricket

- The Footscray Edgewater Cricket Club (formerly Footscray Cricket Club) was founded in 1883 and for the first 113 years of its existence was also located at the Western Oval (now Whitten Oval) until 1996 when combined pressure exerted by the Footscray Football Club and state-government-appointed commissioners to the City of Maribyrnong saw the club relocated to the Mervyn G. Hughes Oval. Until the test cricket debut of the Melbourne Cricket Club's Brad Hodge in December 2005, the Footscray Cricket Club had produced the most Test players of any Melbourne based district cricket club. Footscray's Test representatives in order of debut are Ron Gaunt, Les Joslin, Ken Eastwood, Alan Hurst, Ray Bright, Merv Hughes, Tony Dodemaide and Colin Miller. The club won its only District First Eleven premiership under the captaincy of Lindsay James in 1979/80.
- The Footscray United Cricket Club was founded in 1934 and won the VTCA North A1 Grand Final for 2010–11.

Cycling

- The Footscray Cycling Club promotes road racing and criterium racing, whilst cyclists are represented by the MazzaBUG, the Maribyrnong Bicycle User Group.
- Nearby bike paths include the Maribyrnong River Trail and the Hobsons Bay Coastal Trail.

Football (Soccer)

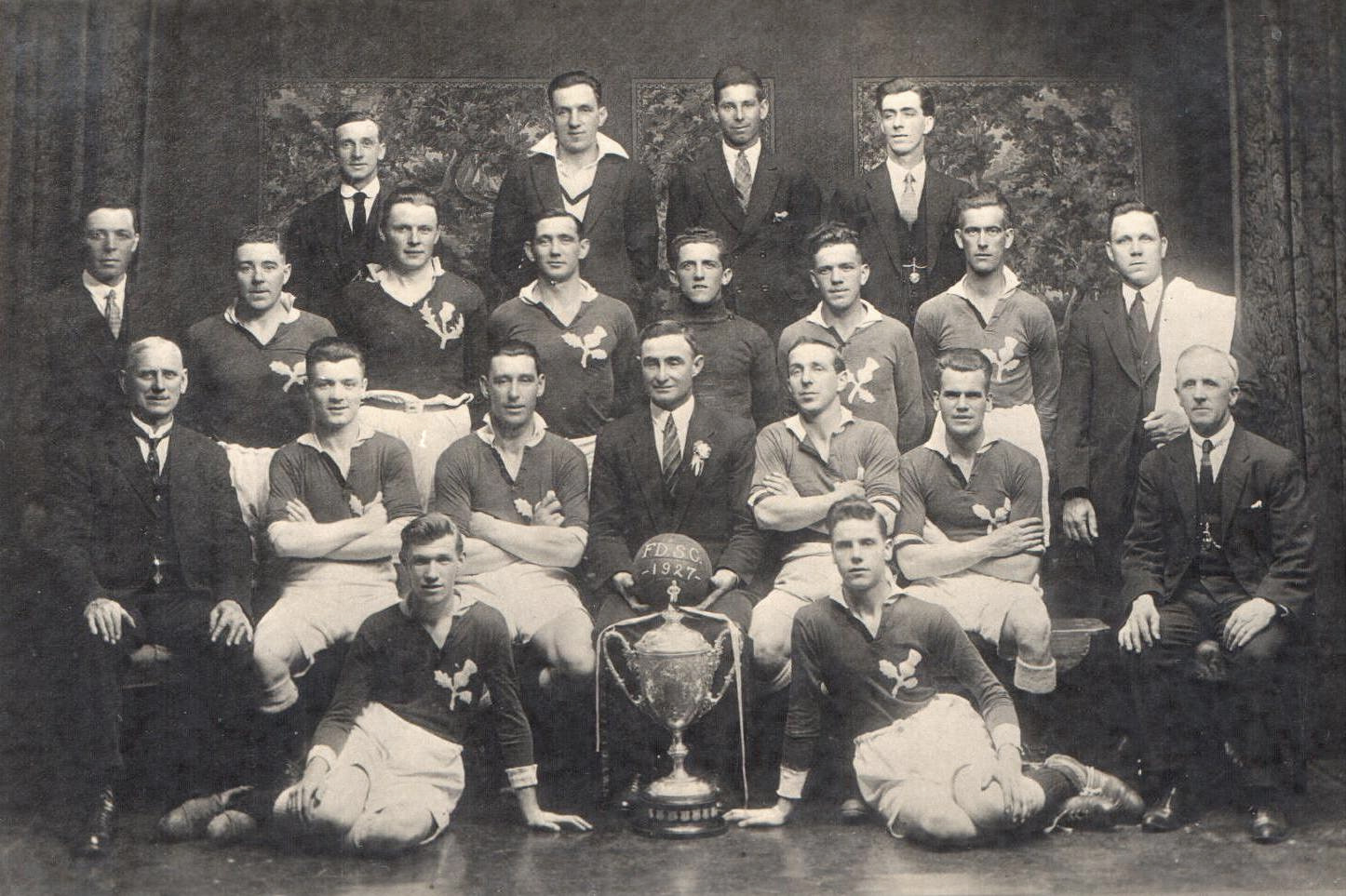
Footscray Thistle with the 1927 Dockerty Cup.

- Footscray Thistle FC (1914 to 1940) was one of Victoria's strongest soccer clubs between the wars - Winning five state league premierships and four Dockerty Cups during that period.
- The football club Melbourne Croatia was founded in Leeds Street, Footscray in 1953, and now bears the name Melbourne Knights FC.
- Footscray JUST (1950 – 1990) was a soccer club which played at Schintler Reserve.
- Footscray Rangers Football Club (2017-) play out of Hansen Reserve West Footscray.

Gridiron (American Football)

- Footscray is home of the Western Crusaders, an American football or Gridiron team which plays in the Gridiron Victoria league. The team was known as the Westside Vikings until 1997, and plays its home games at the Henry Turner Memorial Reserve on Farnsworth Avenue right next door to the iconic Flemington Racecourse, within the Footscray Park area, Maribyrnong River and Victoria University. The Western Crusaders proudly call Footscray its home.

Gymnastics

- Footscray City Gymnastics Club (1981–2025): Served as a much loved community not for profit club for over 40 years. The club formerly operated from venues located at Victoria University (Footscray Park Campus), 460 Geelong Road West Footscray and 10 Mitford Pde West Footscray. Closing in 2025, the club was recognised by its iconic kangaroo logo and philosophy of gymnastics for all abilities.

Hockey

- Footscray Hockey Club (Junior): Run by 90 volunteers, the club is the second-largest hockey club in Melbourne, with playing members from five to 70 years old and a focus on equality for female players.

Horse Racing

- Flemington Racecourse, the home of the Melbourne Cup, is across the Maribyrnong River to the northeast in the neighbouring suburb of Flemington, immediately opposite Footscray Park, the second largest botanical garden in Victoria.

Lacrosse

- The Footscray Lacrosse Club is 50 years old and play at Angliss Reserve in Yarraville. In 2011 the club has around 190 members across 15 Men and Women teams.

Martial Arts

- A.I.M. Academy Headquarters, specialising in martial arts, self-defence and fitness programs for teens and adults, at 201 Barkly Street, Footscray. Opened in 2010.
- Resilience Training Centre runs judo, Brazilian jiu-jitsu (BJJ) and CrossFit training classes for people at all levels of experience, at 86 Buckley Street, Footscray.

Rowing

- Footscray City Rowing Club – This club is over 100 years old and meets at the Footscray Boat Club, Maribyrnong Boulevard. The club is for 14-year-olds and up, beginners, novices, seniors and school programs.

Rugby

- Footscray Rugby Union Club – formed in 1928 and one of the oldest rugby clubs south of the (NSW) border. Footscray RUC has produced 5 Wallabies (Australian national team players), 1 current Wallaroo (Australian national women's team player) and currently plays in the Premier Division of the Victorian Rugby Union. Their home ground is the Dodemaide Oval in Footscray Park, in front of the Vic Uni Ballarat Road campus. The club has men-, women- and junior teams and the players come from a very diverse background. Every year several international students join the club for the duration of their stay. Like many sports clubs in Footscray, the club colours are red, white and blue and the club emblem is a bulldog.

Swimming

- A public swimming pool and gym could form part of a 2014 proposed $12 million redevelopment of Whitten Oval.

Water Polo

- Footscray Swimming & Waterpolo Club – formed in 1909 and commenced activities in the Maribyrnong River, then the Footscray Swim Centre.

== Industry ==
While many factories and warehouses are still to be found in and around the suburb of Footscray, many former industrial sites are being transformed into modern housing estates. Perhaps the largest of these is the former Footscray Ammunition Factory in a prime elevated position overlooking the banks of the Maribyrnong River with views across to Flemington Racecourse and the Melbourne city centre.

The eastern portion of Footscray, in the fork between the Yarra River and Maribyrnong River, contains railway yards, Appleton and Swanson Docks which were the site of the 1998 Australian waterfront dispute and the Melbourne Wholesale Fruit and Vegetable Market. I 2005, the State Government announced the closure of the Melbourne Wholesale Fruit and Vegetable Market to make way for an extensive redevelopment of the Port of Melbourne and the construction of new freight rail links to the area. The market housed 400 businesses, employed 3000 people and supplied 60 per cent of Victoria's fresh produce. It moved to Epping in 2014.

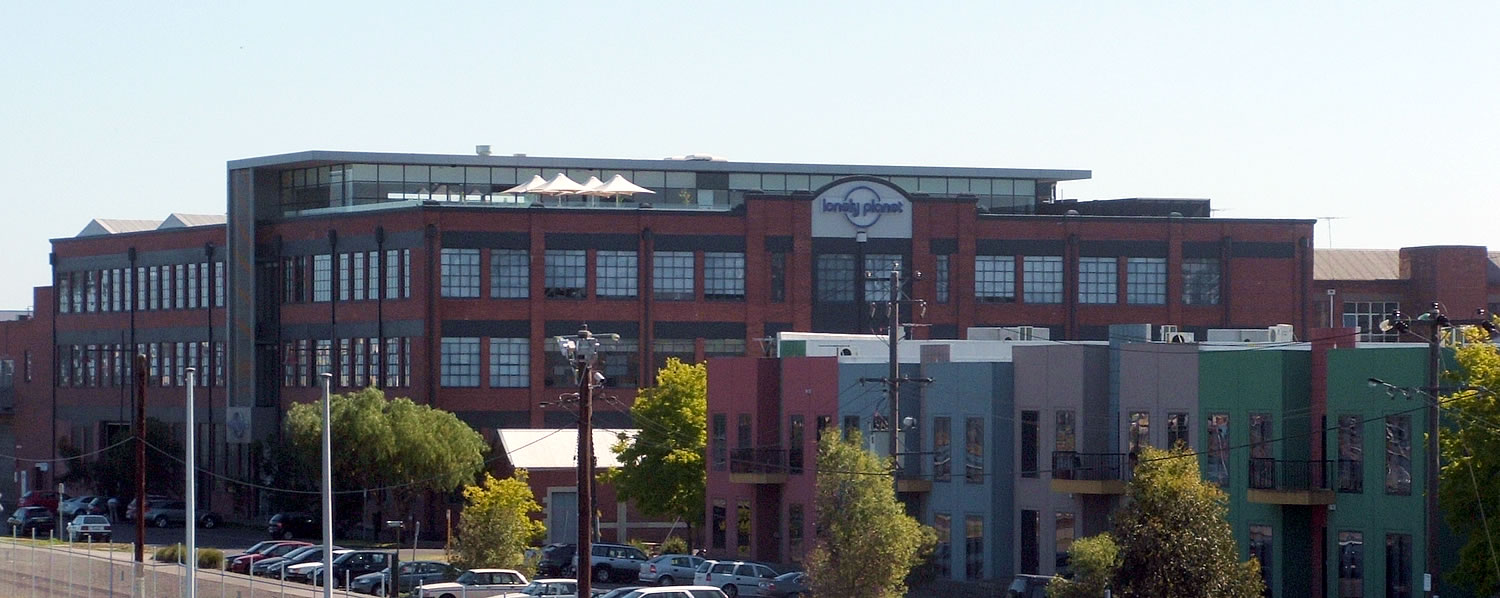
Lonely Planet's former headquarters in Footscray

The headquarters of Lonely Planet Publications were located in eastern Footscray on the banks of the Maribyrnong River, adjacent to the Hobsons Bay Coastal Trail. In 2013, the BBC sold Lonely Planet to an American company for $75 million. The headquarters moved to Carlton in 2016, with the space taken over by coworking space The Dream Factory.

== Notable residents ==
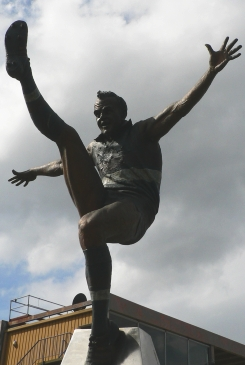
Statue of Ted Whitten

- Bangs (born 1990), South Sudanese-Australian hip hop artist.
- Ray Borner (born 1962), former basketballer and Olympian.
- Ray Bright (born 1954), former Australian test cricketer.
- Coral Browne (1913–1991), International award-winning film and theatre actor who was raised in Footscray.
- Doug Chappel, Comedian.
- William Cooper (1861–1941), Aboriginal rights leader, in 1938 organised the only protest in the world against Kristallnacht. Trees have been planted in Jerusalem in his honour and the footbridge at Footscray Station bears his name.
- James Cuming Sr. (1835–1911), industrialist, mayor of Footscray (1891) and long-serving president of the Footscray Football Club (1895–1911).
- Russell Gilbert (born 1959), TV and film comedian, twice Logie nominated during his nine years on the Hey Hey It's Saturday TV show.
- Merv Hughes (born 1961), former Australian cricketer, played in 53 Test matches, now retired with Mervyn G. Hughes Oval named after him.
- Ray Lawler (1921–2024), actor, playwright, dramatist and theatre director.
- Michael Leunig (1945–2024), cartoonist, poet and an Australian Living Treasure.
- Colin Miller (born 1964), former Australian test cricketer.
- John Setka (born 1964), former CFMEU leader
- Ernie Sigley (1938–2021), former TV presenter and radio compare and TV Week Gold Logie Award winner.
- Les Twentyman (1948–2024), youth worker and social campaigner who has received the Order of Australia and was the 2006 Victorian of the Year.
- Sarah Watt (1958–2011), was an Australian filmmaker, best known for two feature films Look Both Ways and My Year Without Sex. She was a long-time resident of Footscray.
- Ted Whitten (1933–1995), Hall of Fame footballer and TV personality. A life size statue of 'Mr Football' kicking a ball stands outside Whitten Oval on Barkly Street.
- Queenie Williams (1896–1962), actress, dancer, vaudeville performer

== Educational institutions ==
Childcare Centres and Kindergartens

- Angliss Children's Centre – Corner of Vipont Street & Seelaf Square.
- Brenbeal Children's Centre – 8 Rayner Street, Footscray.
- Hyde Street Kindergarten – 10a Hyde Street, Footscray.
- Kingsville Kindergarten – Hansen Reserve, Roberts Street, Footscray.
- Bulldogs Community Child Care Centre – 19 Hocking Street, Footscray.
- The Learning Sanctuary Footscray - 398 Barkly Street, Footscray

Primary

- Footscray City Primary School. The State Government is closing the Steiner stream in 2012.
- Footscray North Primary School, corner Rosamond Rd and Mephan Street, Footscray.
- Footscray Primary School, previously known as Geelong Road Primary, offers the International Baccalaureate, and Vietnamese Bilingual Programme.
- St. John's Catholic Primary School, 90% of the Students are from non-English-speaking backgrounds. The 'My School' website revealed that year 5 students at St John's outperformed their peers at Geelong Grammar School in four out of the five NAPLAN tests, which assess reading, writing, spelling, grammar and punctuation, and numeracy.
- St Monica's Primary School, a Catholic school with around 170 children, big on English Literacy.

Secondary

- Footscray High School – Barkly and Pilgrim campuses for Year 7–9, and Kinnear Campus for Year 10–12.

Universities

- Victoria University, Footscray Park, a seven-hectare site, swimming pool and gym open to the public.
- Victoria University, Footscray Nicholson, range of TAFE programs.

Institutes and more

- Austwide Institute of Training, Automotive Management Institute.
- Leonie Khoury School of Music, lessons for Flute, Clarinet, Saxophone, Piano and Violin.
- Footscray City Films, independent Tertiary Institution offering Certificate IV, Diplomas and Advanced Diplomas in Screen and Media. Over 120 Short Films are produced each year.

Neighbourhood Houses

- Angliss Neighbourhood House Registered training provider delivering adult, community and further education programs and vocational training

=== Public libraries ===
The Footscray Public Library is operated by the Maribyrnong City Council.

The Footscray Mechanics' Institute Inc. was established in 1856, and has operated a library since its inception. The current FMI Library has been located at 209 Nicholson Street since 1913. The library is a private subscription library.

== Health ==
Footscray and surrounding residents are served by the Western General Hospital or WHF. The Western General is a large teaching and research hospital responsible for providing a comprehensive range of inpatient and outpatient acute health services. The hospital currently conducts research in gastroenterology, colorectal cancer, emergency care, oncology, respiratory medicine, sleep disorders, and vascular surgery.

Key services at the Western Hospital include acute medical and surgical services, intensive and coronary care, emergency services, renal services, specialist drug and alcohol services, aged care and palliative care. The hospital also serves as one of the teaching campuses for the University of Melbourne's medical program.

The Western Region Health Centre was established in 1964. Services include an African community worker, refugee health nurse, women's health nurse, dieticians, youth health nurse, diabetic educator, podiatrist, counsellors and physiotherapists. Visiting specialists include a general surgeon and paediatrician. Pathology services and dental services are co-located on site.

== Places of worship ==
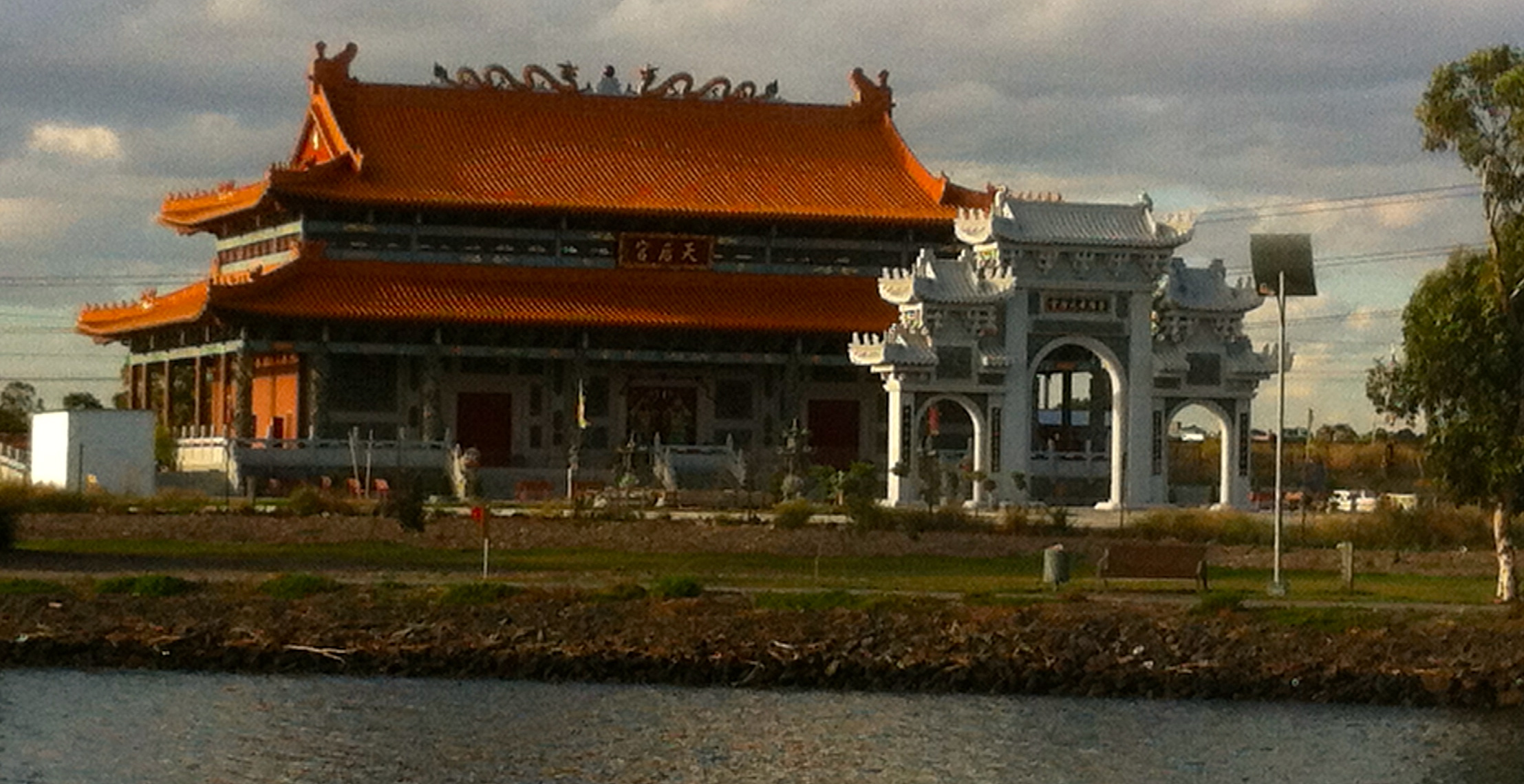
Heavenly Queen Temple

In the 2011 census, 60% of Footscray residences responded that they belonged to a religion, down from 70% in 2006. Religious organisations and places of worship represented in Footscray include Anglican, Assemblies of God, Baptist, Buddhist, Catholic, Church of Christ, Evangelical Christian, Independent Christian, Lutheran, Macedonian Orthodox, Muslim, Pentecostal, Presbyterian and Uniting Church.

The Heavenly Queen Temple, the largest temple of the Chinese sea-goddess Mazu in Australia, is being built on the banks of the river. It includes a 16 m (52 ft) gold statue.

== Media ==
Two free suburban weekly newspapers are delivered in Footscray on Wednesdays:

- The Maribyrnong Leader (formerly the Western Times) is published by Leader Community Newspapers and owned by News Corporation.
- The Maribyrnong & Hobsons Bay Star Weekly is published by Metro Media Publishing, which is owned by Fairfax and the Star News Group.

Historical newspapers:

- The Independent was a weekly newspaper published from 1883 to 1933.
- The Advertiser (1874–1982); (1914–1918 available via Trove), whose origins may be traced back to 1859.

== See also ==
- City of Footscray – Footscray was previously within this former local government area.
- Electoral district of Footscray
- Cuming, Smith & Co.
