= Sun Theatre =

Cinema theatre in Melbourne, Victoria, Australia

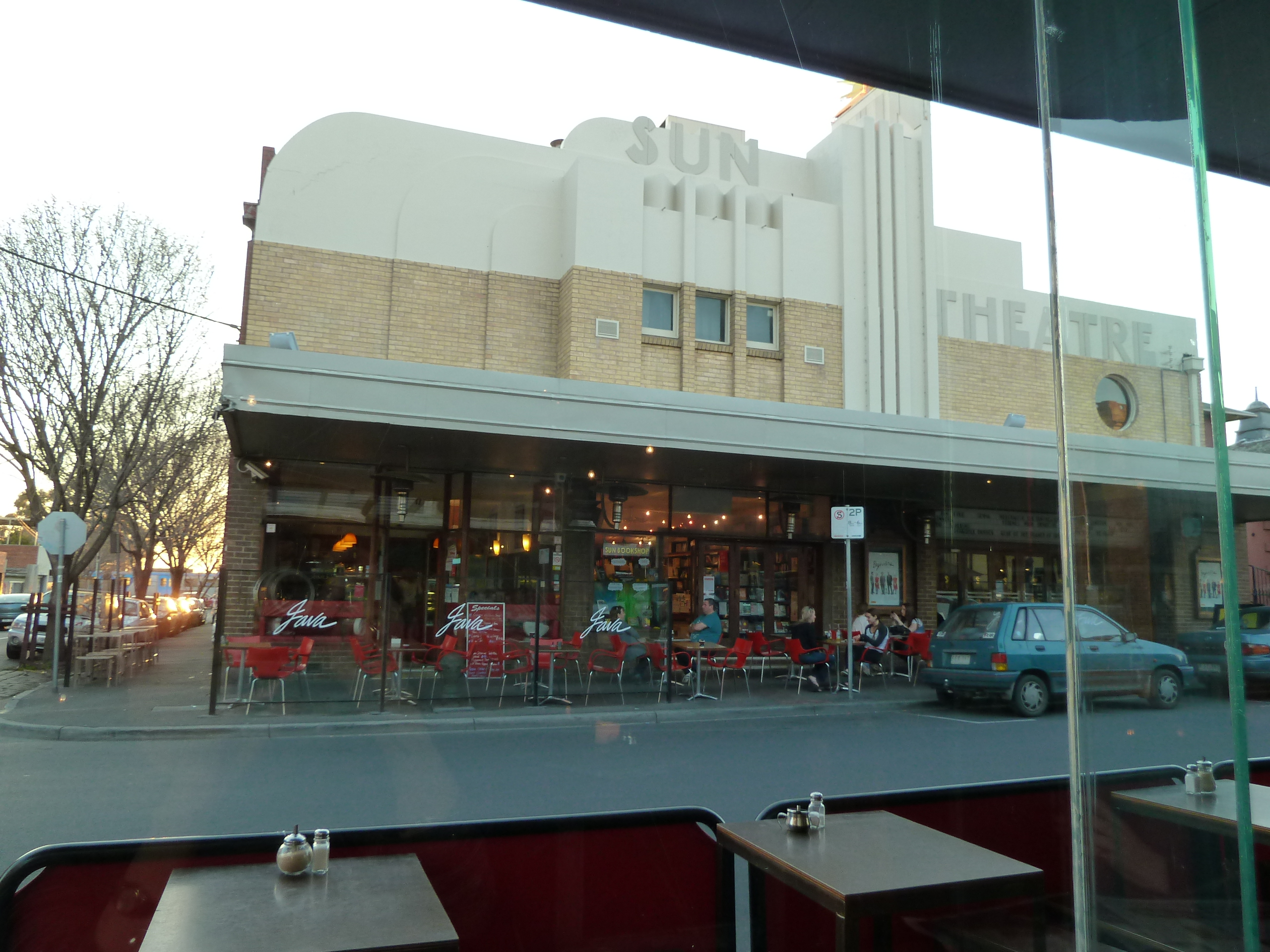
- The theatre facade, in 2011

- Location of the cinema theatre in Greater Metropolitan Melbourne
- Interactive map of Sun Theatre
- Location: 6–12 Ballarat Street, Yarraville, Melbourne, Victoria, Australia
- Coordinates: 37°48′58″S 144°53′27″E
- Owner: E. C. Yeomans and family (1938–1960s); Sun Theatre Trust (since 1995) (Anne and Michael Smith)
- Type: Cinema theatre; Other uses (1960s–1970s)
- Screen: 8

Construction
- Opened: 1938; 88 years ago
- Closed: 1960s (as a cinema); 1970s (other uses)
- Rebuilt: 1995–1997
- Years active: 1938–1960s; since 1997–; (as a cinema)
- Architects: Cowper, Murphy & Appleford (1938)

Website
- suntheatre.com.au

Site notes
- Architectural style: Streamline Moderne

Victorian Heritage Register
- Official name: Sun Theatre
- Type: Registered place
- Designated: 23 December 1987
- Reference no.: H0679
- Heritage overlay no.: HO23
- Category: Recreation and Entertainment

The Sun Theatre is an eight-screen independent movie theatre, located at 6–12 Ballarat Street in Yarraville, an inner-western suburb of Melbourne, in Victoria, Australia. Operated as a cinema between 1938 and the 1960s, the building was repurposed for other uses and was left abandoned for eighteen years. It was then bought and operated for a film club before reopening as a cinema in 2003. The theatre was added to the Victorian Heritage Register on 23 December 1987.

== History ==
The Sun Theatre was opened by the Mayor of Footscray in 1938 as a single-screen cinema with 1,050 seats. It was the fourth cinema built for the promoter E. C. Yeomans. The popular theatre was notable as the most luxurious cinema in the area, with ticket counters, a booking office, and candy store, and drew large crowds. A unique feature was a pram room, where babies in their prams were placed and given a number. If a baby started crying, its number was flashed on the screen.

The Sun's popularity began to dwindle with the introduction of television in Australia. In the 1970s, with large Greek migration to Melbourne, the Sun became a Greek-language theatre, and after a decade it was forcibly closed by the Department of Public Health. The Sun remained closed for 18 years, before being bought by Michael Smith in 1995. The theatre had been largely neglected, with the roof being left opened. The inside was full of graffiti and had been burned out at least twice. The theatre was renovated and opened for monthly screenings for a film club in 1997. In 2002, the cinema was granted heritage permission to convert it from a one-screen cinema to four, and it was opened to the public on 22 May 2003.

== Description ==
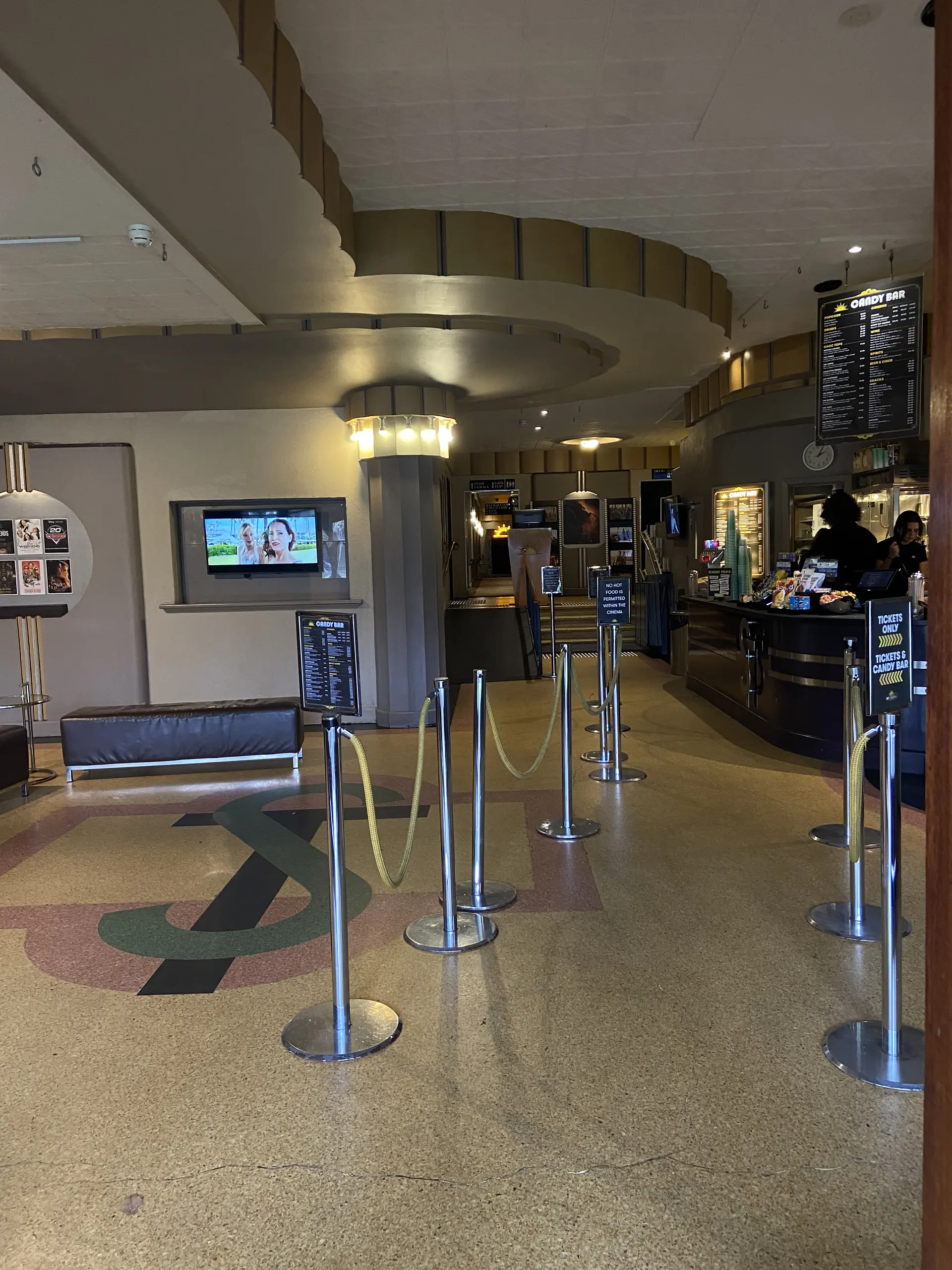
Interior of the Sun Theatre

Designed by Christopher Cowper of Cowper, Murphy & Appleford, the Streamline Moderne facade, with its elaborate "sun" motif, is a striking and original external feature. At night the front elevation was illuminated by sodium tube flood lighting with the tower surmounted by a flashing sun in red and gold. The name of the theatre in cut cement letters at the top is illuminated by neon lighting.

The Sun Theatre was the first Melbourne cinema built with a parabolic floor where the elevated seats are approached from a separate foyer entrance. The auditorium comprised an ornate ceiling with a honeycomb diamond of diffused interior lighting. A large foyer contained the usual ticket box and reservation office, a terrazzo floor in different tones of red, green and black with the theatre insignia inscribed in brass strips.

The Sun Theatre remains one of the few fully articulated internally and externally Streamline Moderne-style cinemas to remain in Victoria. Built as a consciously modern attraction for citizens of the inner western suburbs, the Sun Theatre is also a legacy of a form of social entertainment that reached a peak in the 1930s and 40s. The cinema played an important role in the community life of the district and was an important landmark for the Yarraville district. The cinema is also of interest as one of the few to remain in private hands until the Yeomans family sold it in the 1960s.

Since reopening with four screens, the Sun Theatre now has eight, with each being individually named. The Trocadero, the Lyric and the Grand are named after closed-down local cinemas.

== In popular culture ==
The Sun Theatre was the filming location for some select interior scenes for the 2015 movie The Dressmaker. While in its abandoned state, the theatre featured in the music video for The Go-Betweens' "Streets of Your Town."

Quentin Tarantino, Samuel L. Jackson and Kurt Russell visited the theatre in 2016, whilst in Melbourne promoting the roadshow 70mm release of The Hateful Eight. One of a few Australian venues to screen the presentation, reportedly, Tarantino was impressed by the theatre's attempt to secure a suitable projector for the screening.

== See also ==
- Architecture of Melbourne
- List of places on the Victorian Heritage Register in the City of Maribyrnong
