= Henderson House, Footscray =

Community arts centre in Melbourne, Australia

Henderson House
- Location within Melbourne
- Interactive map of the Henderson House area
- Alternative names: Henderson's Piggery; Henderson's Piggery and Wharf

General information
- Status: Completed
- Architectural style: Victorian Italianate
- Location: 43-45 Moreland Street, Footscray, Melbourne, Victoria, Australia
- Coordinates: 37°48′11″S 144°54′27″E
- Current tenants: Footscray Community Arts Centre
- Year built: 1872–1873
- Completed: 1873; 153 years ago
- Client: Samuel Henderson
- Owner: Samuel Henderson (1872–1874); anor (1874–1970s); Footscray / Maribyrnong councils (since late 1970s)

Technical details
- Material: Bluestone, slate
- Floor count: 2

Victorian Heritage Register
- Official name: Henderson House
- Type: Registered place
- Designated: 9 October 1974
- Reference no.: H0183
- Heritage overlay on.: HO77
- Heritage inventory no.: H7822-0444
- Category: Residential buildings (private)

Register of the National Estate
- Official name: Lemprieres Building
- Type: Defunct register
- Designated: 21 October 1980
- Reference no.: 5474

Henderson House, also known as Henderson's Piggery or Henderson's Piggery & Wharf, is a former house and piggery, now a community arts centre, located at 43-45 Moreland Street in Footscray, an inner-western suburb of Melbourne, in Victoria, Australia. Built in 1873 as a residential dwelling for the Henderson family on the western bank of the Maribyrnong River, the building was acquired by the local government in the 1970s and repurposed for use as the Footscray Community Arts Centre, and comprises an urban park leading to the Maribyrnong River Trail and the river.

Located on the traditional lands of the Wurundjeri Woi-Wurrung, the house was added to the Victorian Heritage Register on 9 October 1974 in recognition of its historical and architectural significance; and the adjacent Lemprieres Building, used as part of the piggery, was added to the now defunct Register of the National Estate on 21 October 1980.

== History ==
Henderson House was constructed in Moreland Street, Footscray on the Saltwater River, now known as the Maribyrnong River, between 1872 and 1873 for Samuel Henderson. The house was part of an extensive quadrangular complex which included a factory for ham and bacon curing, and an associated residence. The house and attached curing works building remain from this original complex. Between 1870 and 1872, Henderson occupied, and then owned, a curing and slaughter house on the Melbourne Road, that was established in the late 1860s by William Smith, a ham curer. In 1872-3 Henderson relocated his operations to new premises he had built in a convenient location between Maribrynong Street, on the west bank of the river, and Moreland Street.

== Description ==
The extensive complex of buildings was constructed around a courtyard and consisted of a house, a main factory building and other associated buildings, including a boiler house and chimney. The buildings formed a geometric garden that extended to the river front.

The main buildings were constructed of coursed rubble bluestone, with cream brick dressings as quoining around openings, and had slate roofs. The Victorian Italianate house, sited to face the river, was designed with an elevated verandah, a central entrance flanked by polygonal bays and a basement below.

By 1874 Henderson had sold the property and it has since had a number of owners and uses. Swallow and Ariell, biscuit manufacturers, occupied the site from the 1920s, and Lempriere and Company Limited, metal merchants, from the late 1950s. Many of the buildings were demolished in the late 1960s and the residence and adjoining curing building remain. The house faces the river, with an adjacent reserve and wharf, the latter also listed on the Victorian Heritage Register as the Saltwater River Crossing Site and Footscray Wharves Precinct.

== Footscray Community Arts ==
The Footscray City Council, now the Maribyrnong City Council, purchased the Henderson House site in the late 1970s and it was adapted for use as the Footscray Community Arts Centre, and was renovated in 2020–2021.

Footscray Community Arts, formerly Footscray Community Arts Centre (FCAC), is a centre for contemporary arts, community engagement, cultural development and multicultural arts. Established in 1974, millions of community members have visited FCAC or directly participated in one or more of its many events, initiatives, projects, workshops and programs. The Brown Cabs theatre company has been company in residence since 2012, headed by Torres Strait Islander writer, director, and producer John Harvey. Harvey has co-curated the Black Screen program with Moondani Balluk of Victoria University, and supported the centre's Indigenous cultural program, as well as First Nations artists and members of the community. In 2022, FCA won the Arts Award in the Victorian of the Year awards.

An outdoor entertainment precinct, called Lango, located on the banks of the river, adjacent to the community arts centre, was completed in 2025, funded in part by an $8.5 million grant from the Victorian Government.

== See also ==
- Architecture of Melbourne
- Saltwater River Crossing Site and Footscray Wharves Precinct
- List of places on the Victorian Heritage Register in the City of Maribyrnong
