= Pickens (surname) =

Pickens is a surname. Notable people with the surname include:

- Andrew Pickens (congressman) (1739–1817), American soldier and politician; US Representative from South Carolina
- Andrew Pickens (governor) (1779–1838), American soldier, lawyer, planter, and politician; governor of South Carolina; son of Andrew Pickens (congressman)
- Bruce Pickens (born 1968), American football player
- Buster Pickens (1916–1964), American blues pianist
- Carl Pickens (born 1970), American football player
- Champ Pickens (1877–1963), American football expert
- Claude Pickens (1900–1985), American missionary and photographer in China
- Douschka Pickens (1859–1893), leader of the Red Shirts in Edgefield County, South Carolina
- Ezekiel Pickens (1768–1813), American politician; lieutenant governor of South Carolina
- Francis Wilkinson Pickens (1805–1869), American politician; governor of South Carolina
- George Pickens (born 2001), American football player
- Israel Pickens (1780–1827) American politician; governor of Alabama
- James Pickens, Jr. (born 1954), American actor
- Jon Pickens (born 1954) American game designer and editor
- Karlyn Pickens (born 2004), American softball player
- Lucy Pickens (1832–1899), American socialite and First Lady of South Carolina
- Mary Pickens, American politician
- Slim Pickens (1919–1983), American actor and cowboy
- T. Boone Pickens, Jr. (1928–2019), American businessman and philanthropist
- J. P. Pickens (1937–1973), American musician, poet, and artist
- Vinton Liddell Pickens (1900–1993), American artist and activist
- William Pickens (1881–1954), African-American orator, educator, journalist, and essayist
- Willie Pickens (1931–2017), American musician
- Zacch Pickens (born 2000), American football player
