= Picken =

Picken may refer to:

- Allan Picken (born 1981), Australian professional footballer
- Andrew Picken (1788–1833), novelist born in Paisley, Scotland
- Bill Picken, Chairman of the Sydney Turf Club (STC)
- Billy Picken, former Australian Australian rules footballer
- Ebenezer Picken, (1769–1816) Scottish poet and songwriter
- Harvie Picken (born 1888), prominent Australian businessman
- J. T. Picken, Australian businessman
- Jack Picken (1880–1952), Scottish footballer
- Joanna Belfrage Picken, (1798–1859), satirist and poet
- Laurence Picken (1909–2007), ethnomusicologist and scientist
- Liam Picken (born 1986), Australian rules footballer
- Lillian Hoxie Picken (1852–1913), American educator and textbook compiler
- Marcus Picken (born 1979), former Australian rules footballer
- Mary Brooks Picken, influential American author on needlework, sewing, and textile arts
- Phil Picken (born 1985), English football player
- T. Boone Picken (born 1928), American business magnate and financier
- William Picken Alexander (1905–1993), British educator and educational administrator

== See also ==
- Piceno (disambiguation)
- Pickenia
- Pickens (disambiguation)
- Picking (disambiguation)
- Picon (disambiguation)
- Picón
