= Yarrabee Flats =

Coordinates: 37.836906°S 144.98511°E

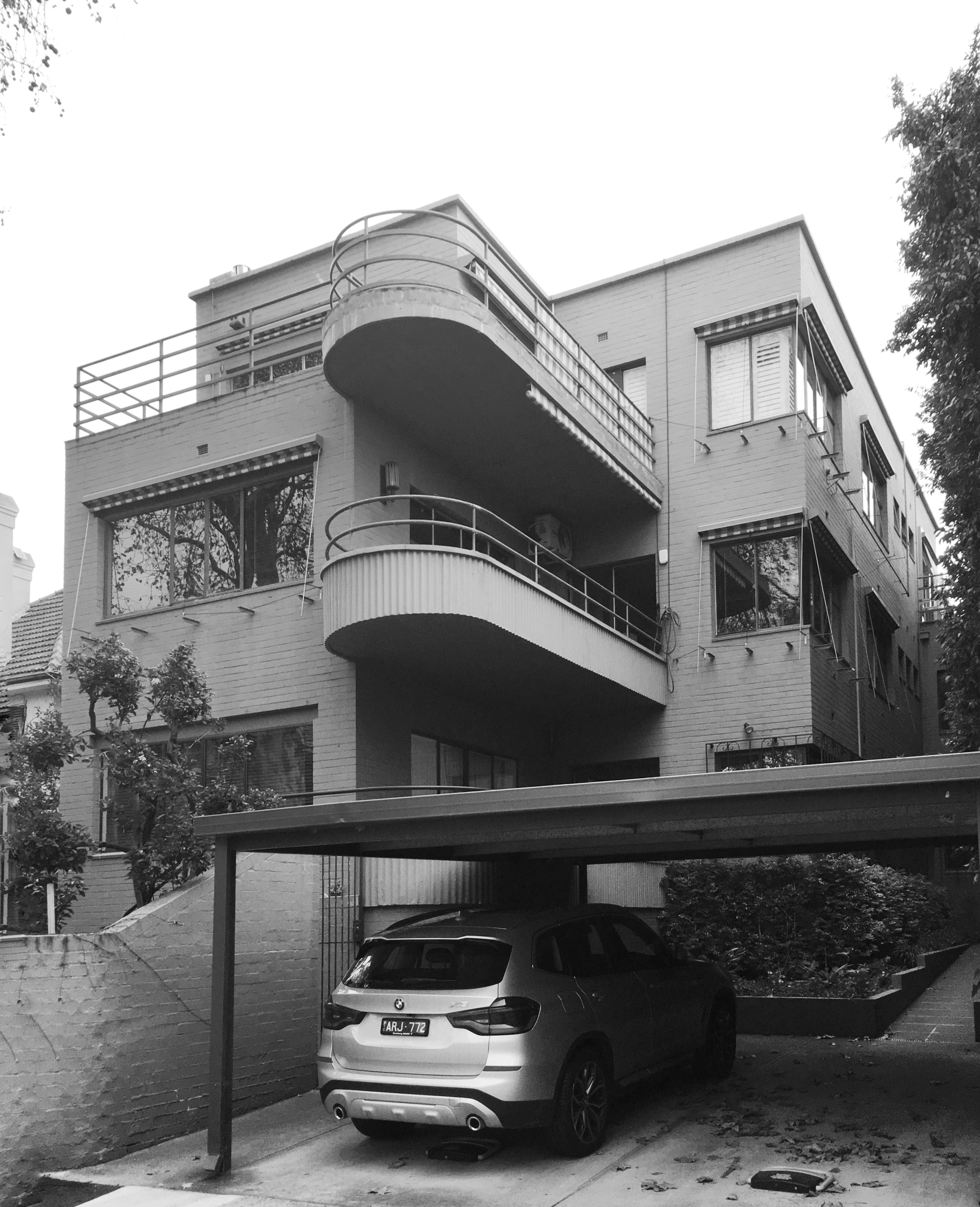
- View from Mona Place
- Interactive map of the Yarrabee Flats area

General information
- Architectural style: Modernist
- Location: 44 Walsh Street, South Yarra, Melbourne, Victoria, Australia
- Completed: 1940

Design and construction
- Architects: Mary Turner Shaw and Frederick Romberg
- Architecture firm: Romberg & Shaw

Yarrabee Flats is a building located at 44 Walsh street, South Yarra, Melbourne, Australia consisting of five flats. Built in 1940. it was designed by the Australian architecture firm, Romberg & Shaw, (Mary Turner Shaw and Frederick Romberg) and is known for introducing European Modernist architecture into flat development in Melbourne.

== Romberg ==
Frederick Romberg (b. 1912, Tsing-tao, China - d. 1992, Australia ) was a Swiss trained architect who emigrated to Australia in 1938. He soon became established in Melbourne as an independent architect. His work is characterised by its forward looking design features and transcendence of the rules of architecture of old Europe.

== Shaw ==
Mary Turner Shaw (b. 1906, Victoria, Australia - d. 1990 ). Mary (Mollie) Turner Shaw had found it difficult to complete her architecture studies at the University of Melbourne, and instead became an architect via articled studentship. She worked for various Architectural Firms in Australia (1931-1936) and the UK (1937), and traveled Europe meeting many key Modernist architects. After working for others again in Australia (1938), she formed an architectural firm, Romberg & Shaw, with the Modernist architect Frederick Romberg. The firm operated from 1939 to 1942. During that period they produced "some of the most celebrated blocks of flats in Australia", including the Yarrabee Flats, and the Newburn Flats, South Melbourne, Victoria in 1939. Shaw continued to practice architecture until her retirement in 1969.

== Description ==
Yarabee Flats runs through from Walsh Street to a ‘rear’ elevation facing the end of the cul-de-sac Mona Place to the east. The street elevations present familiar forms of Art Deco curve ended projecting balconies, which only hint at the complex plan of five flats where only two are the same, and flat 4 is three bedrooms and a maid's room over two levels. Romberg demonstrates concern for sunlight unusual in pre-war Melbourne with all apartments having a northerly aspect, either lounge room or a balcony, with large areas of plate glass in thin steel frames, including the balcony doors. Sun control was originally achieved with striped awnings. The Walsh Street elevation is designed as if the block is floating above the two garages, with slim pilotti flanking one entry, and cantilevered balconies above the other. The cream brick work, which has been painted, originally contrasted with the most interesting feature, the serrated edging of the concrete balconies, achieved by using corrugated iron as formwork.

== Similar buildings ==
Yarrabee Flats is one of a series of pre war buildings designed by Romberg in association with Mary Turner Shaw. They were both employees of Stephenson and Turner. Two comparable buildings from the period are Newburn flats and Stanhill flats in South Melbourne. Similarities include the open, cantilevered balconies, the generous windows, and the detailed facade

== Key influences ==
Yarrabee Flats shows many influences from European modernist architecture. The generous north-facing windows and balconies show an interest in bright, airy, sun filled living, while the bold cantilevered round-ended balconies could be inspired by the 1920s work of Erich Mendelsohn or Walter Gropius.

== Changes since construction ==
The brickwork has been painted the same colour as the concrete balconies, and garden walls added on the Walsh Street side. The layout of the flats is largely unchanged, except for the opening out of many of the kitchens, and the conversion of the maids room in flat 5 to a dressing room.

== Gallery ==
Yarabee Flats

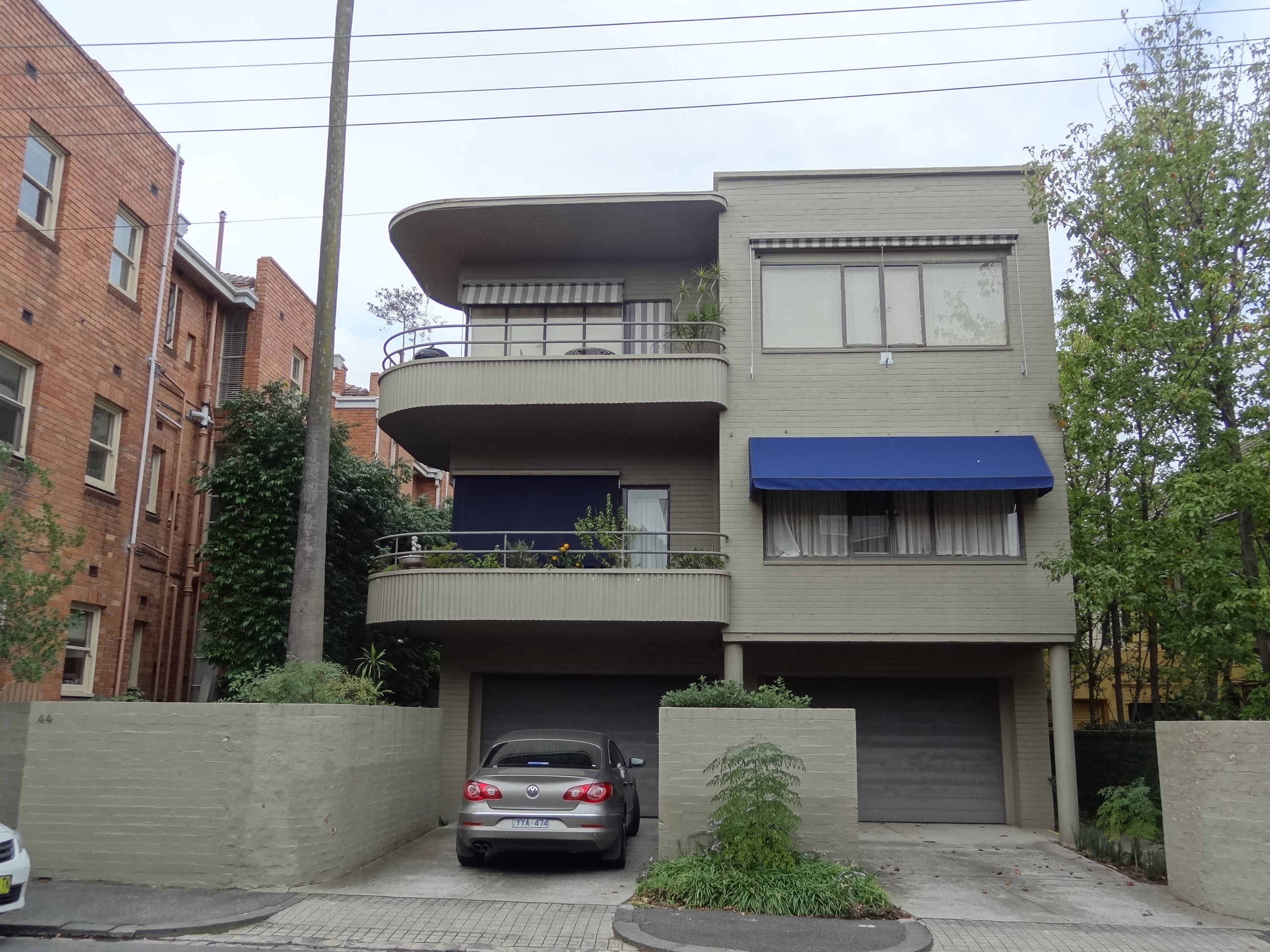
Walsh Street front

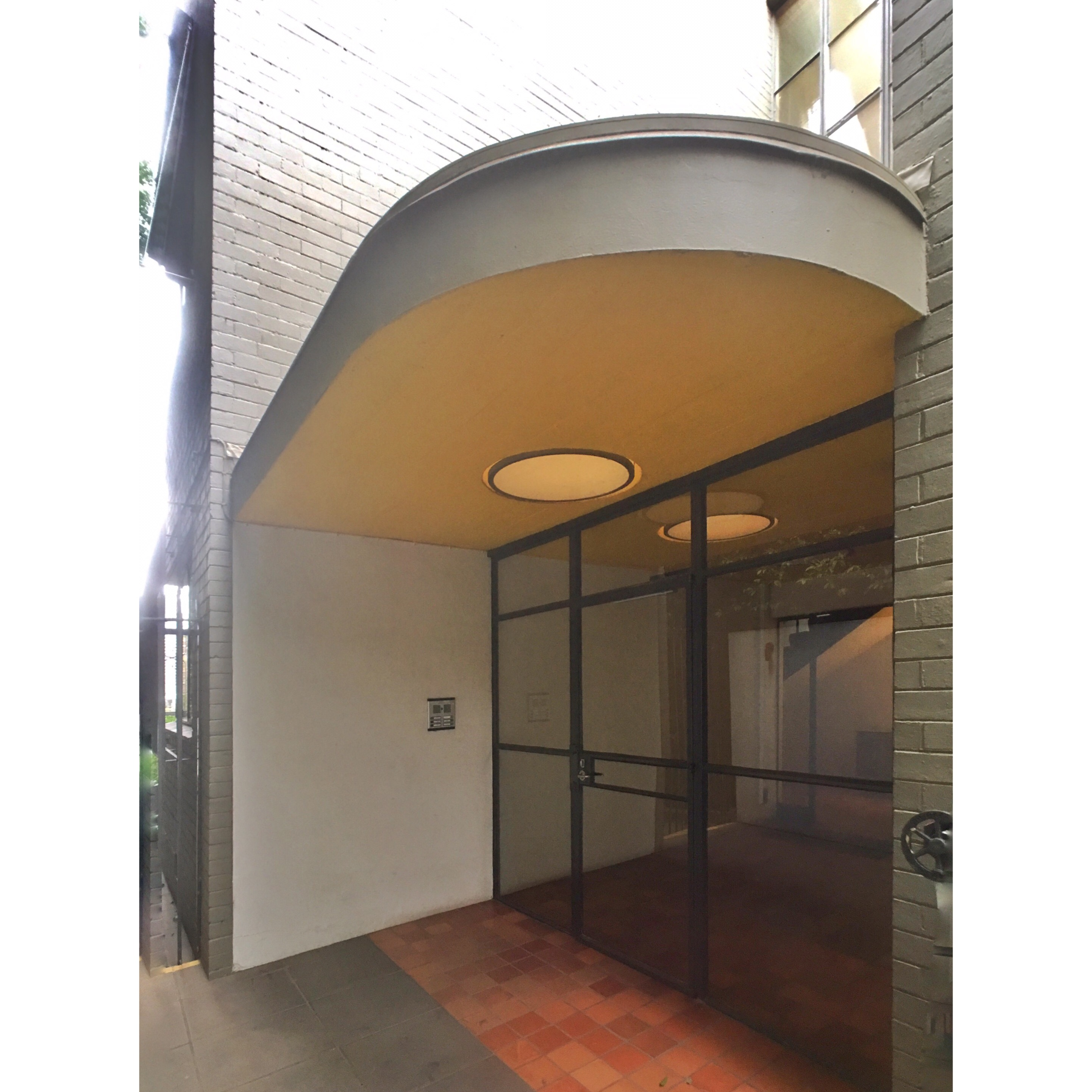
Entry

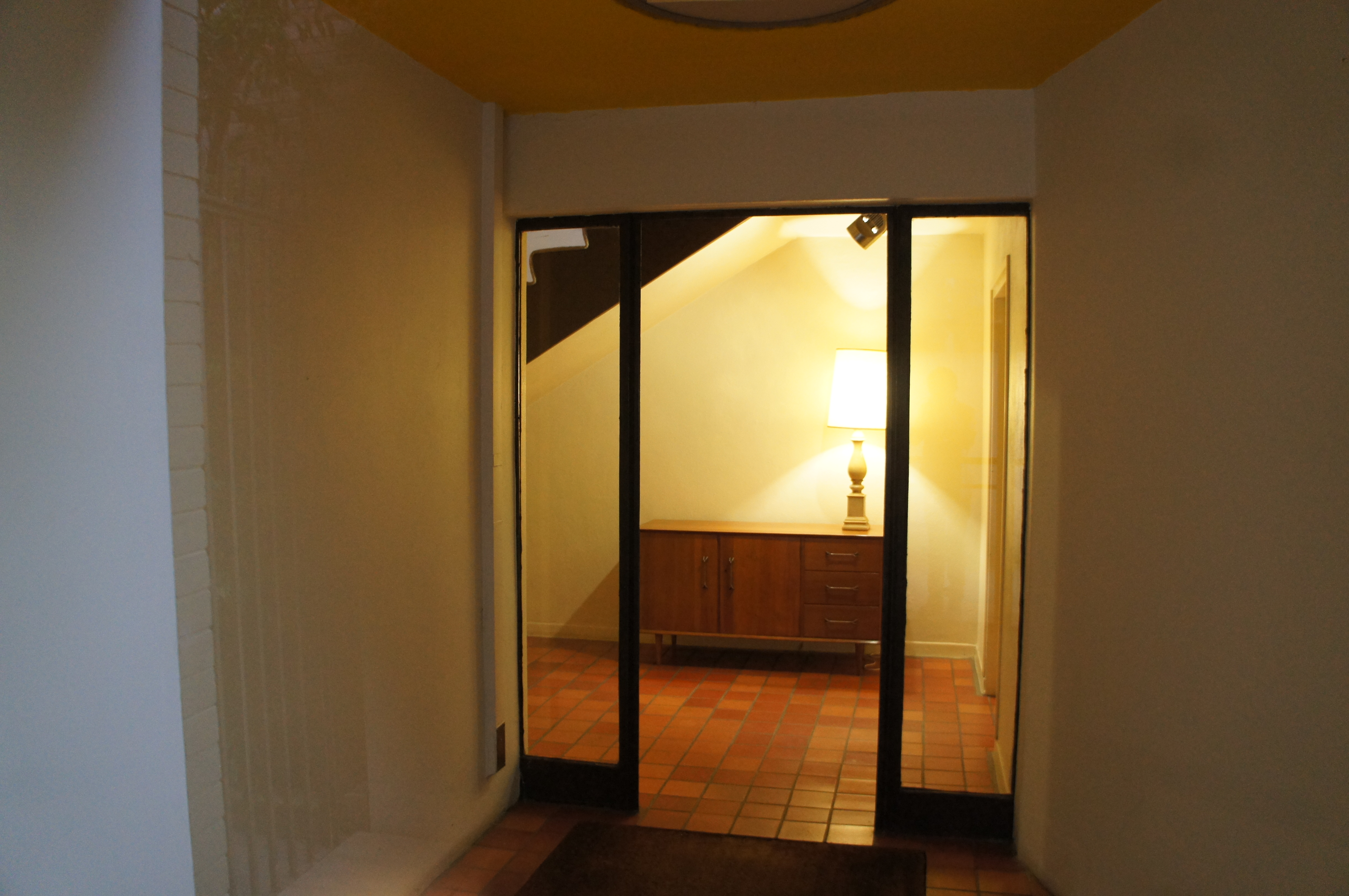
Lobby

Elevation

Ground floor plan

First floor plan

Second floor plan
