= MacFarland Library, Ormond College =

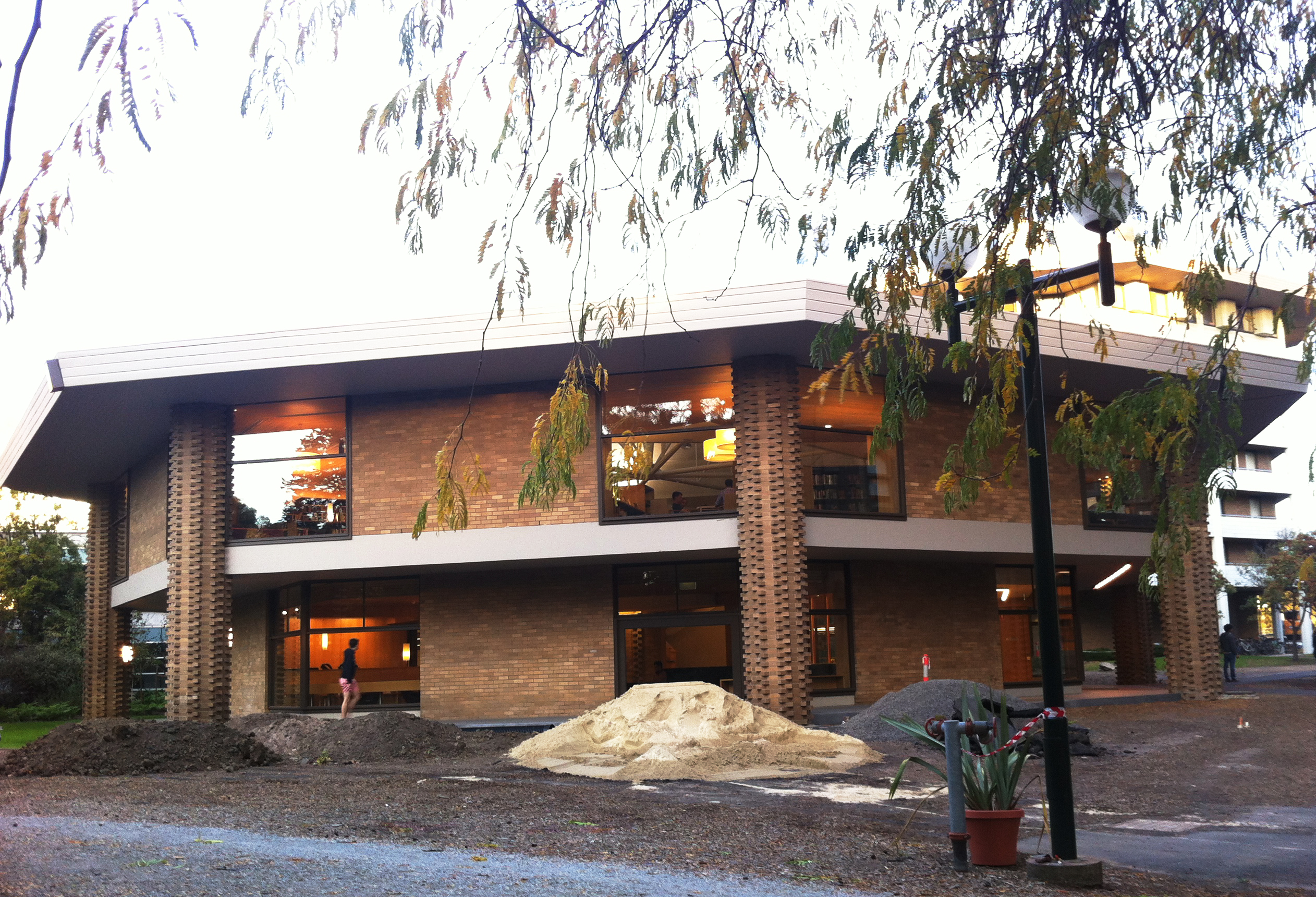

- Location within Melbourne

General information
- Type: Library
- Architectural style: Gothic Revival
- Location: Melbourne, Australia
- Coordinates: 37.7929°S 144.9571°E
- Completed: 1962 - 1965, 2011 (redesigned)

Design and construction
- Architects: Frederick Romberg, Romberg and Boyd Architects and McGlashan Everist

The MacFarland Library at Ormond College, the University of Melbourne, completed in 1965, was Frederick Romberg’s (Romberg and Boyd Architects) second building for Ormond College. The initial scheme for the building in 1962 was a largely classical building that drew on elements from many of Romberg’s buildings from the previous decade. The subsequent revised scheme better complemented the rest of Reed and Barnes’ Gothic Revival Ormond college. The central plan of the library is a tribute to long tradition of library building including the Melbourne Public Library’s domed reading room, which involved Joseph Reed, Selwyn Bates, Norman Peebles and Charles Smart.

== Description ==
The MacFarland Library at Ormond College was named after Sir John MacFarland, who was the College's Master (head of College) from its opening in 1881 until 1914. He was The University of Melbourne's Vice Chancellor from 1910 to 1918 and Chancellor from 1918 to 1935, establishing the position of salaried Vice-Chancellor in the 1930s.

The building is two stories high with an octagonal plan and a central spiral staircase. The interior volume is divided into smaller rooms by brick walls and timber or glass partitions. The octagonal form and thick exterior columns at the corners formed by interlocking brickwork gives the building sturdy appearance. Originally, the general library was found on the ground level while the second floor housed the theological library.

The library is a Victorian Heritage listed building as part of Ormond College, which includes the original Main Building, completed in 1881 and designed by Reed and Barnes.

The heritage building was re-designed and completed in June 2011 by architects McGlashan Everist, in conjunction with learning environment expert Associate Professor Peter Jamieson and the Master of Ormond, Associate Professor Rufus Black. It was renamed the Ormond College Academic Centre, which contains the MacFarland Library as well as space for learning, office and study space for Ormond College students and staff.

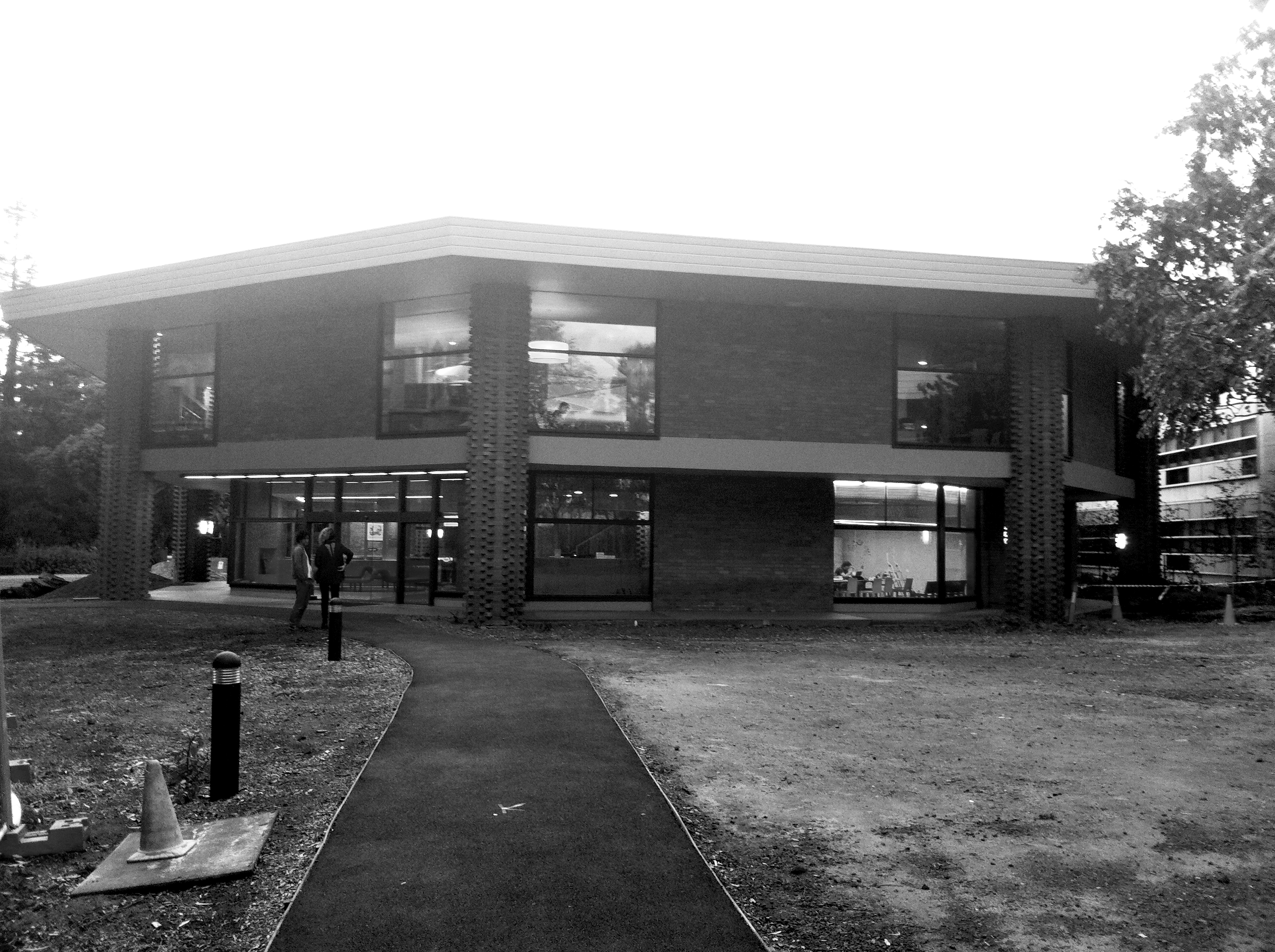
MacFarland Library, Ormond College

== Key influences and design approach ==
This library displays Frederick Romberg’s interest in complex geometries and continues the polygonal type pavilion design similar to the planning arrangement he explored with Picken Court (1961–1963). The classical rotunda form and central spiral staircase were influence by Karl Schinkel.

The treatment displayed to the MacFarland Library is considered more robust and heavier, matching the appropriately Ruskinian ‘rawness’ of the Reed & Barnes treatment of the Barrabool sandstone. Tan coloured bricks with ‘dog tooth’ details to each of the polygonal brick columns and the heavy timber fascia arc back to Romberg's earlier buildings and also reflect the evolving trends with Architectural materials & finishes used throughout the mid 1960s.

The re-designed interior by McGlashan Everist was influenced by Islamic architecture and reading room domes. The interior was stripped to find a geometric steel truss forming the roof structure and supported the ceiling for the ground floor. This led to the re-design taking shape of a glass domed roof, exposing the steel truss and allowing light into the core of the building. Timber was used throughout, including recycled timbers, to help with acoustic control and ventilation systems adopted to allow for natural ventilation and night purging.

First Floor Plan of MacFarland Library, Ormond College

== Awards ==
The re-design by McGlashan Everist won six awards in 2012:

- 2012 Australian Architecture Awards - National Award for Heritage
- 2012 Australian Institute of Architects - Victorian Architecture Awards (3 awards) - Heritage, Interior Architecture and Public Architecture (Alterations and Additions)
- 2012 Australian Timber Design Awards - Interior Fitout: Commercial
- 2012 Council of Educational Facility Planners International (CEFPI) - Category 2: Renovation/Modernisation of School/Major Facility
