= ETA Foods Factory =

Heritage-listed former food factory, Braybrook, Melbourne, Victoria, Australia

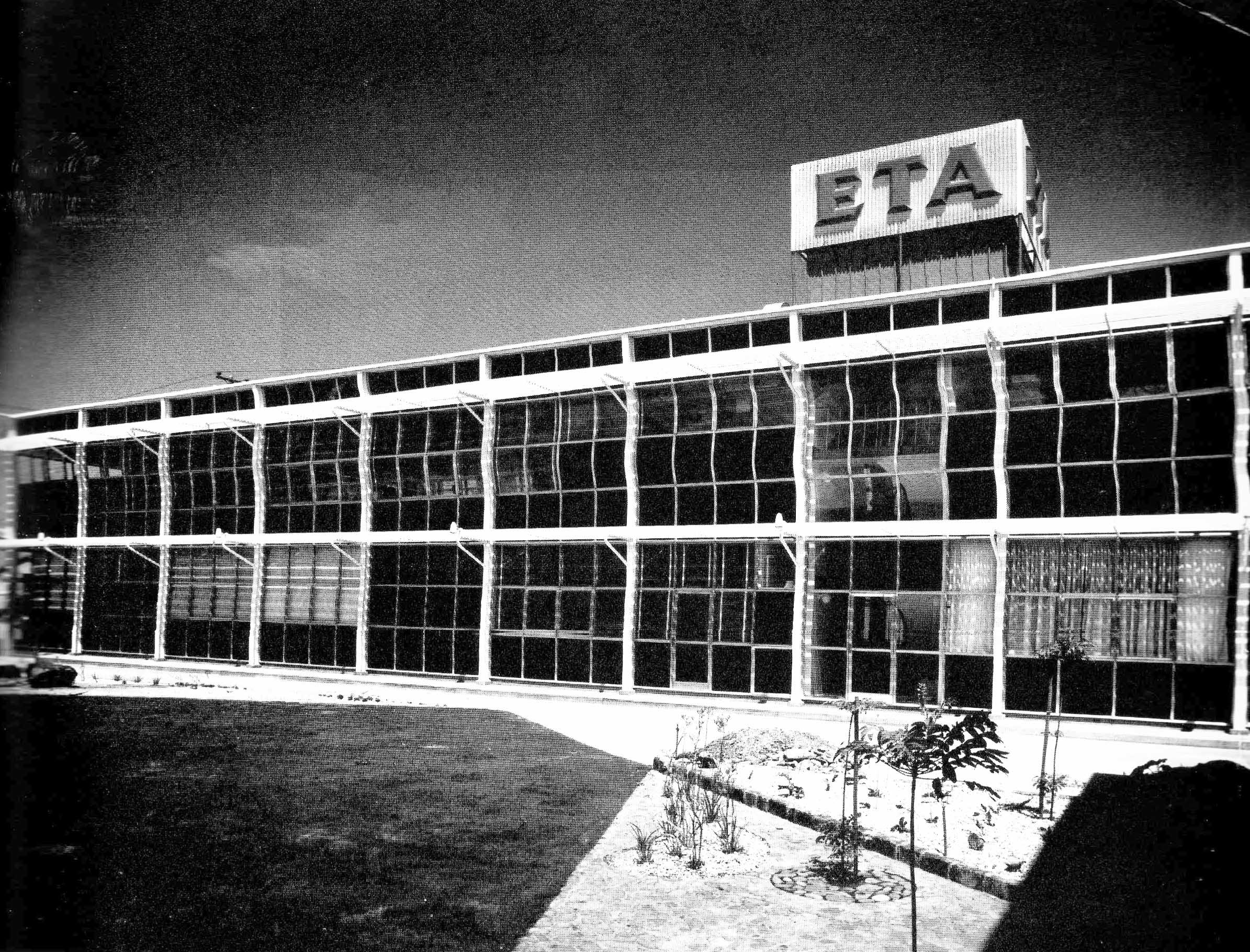
- ETA Foods Factory in 1957 (Source: Kenneth Ross, via RMIT University, 2000)

- Location within Melbourne

General information
- Status: Completed
- Type: Food manufacturing factory
- Architectural style: Modernist (International)
- Location: Braybrook, Melbourne, Victoria, Ballarat Road, Australia
- Coordinates: 37°46′48″S 144°51′33″E
- Named for: ETA peanuts
- Completed: 1957; 69 years ago
- Opened: March 1962, by Premier Henry Bolte
- Client: Nuts Foods Pty Ltd

Technical details
- Material: Steel, glass, aluminium

Design and construction
- Architect: Frederick Romberg
- Architecture firm: Grounds Romberg and Boyd
- Structural engineer: John Connell
- Other designers: Teisutis (Joe) Zikaras (sculpture); John Stevens (landscaping)
- Known for: Miesian glass curtain wall

Victorian Heritage Register
- Official name: ETA Former Food Factory
- Type: Registered place
- Designated: 31 May 2001
- Reference no.: H1916
- Heritage overlay no.: HO83
- Categories: Manufacturing and Processing; Public Art

The ETA Foods Factory is a heritage-listed former manufacturing plant, located on Ballarat Road, in Braybrook, a suburb of Melbourne, in Victoria, Australia. Designed by Frederick Romberg in the Modernist International style and completed in 1957, the building is notable for its glass curtain wall design.

The building was added to the Victorian Heritage Register on 31 May 2001 in recognition of its architectural, aesthetic and historical significance. The site, including the building and a sculpture, was also added to a non-statutory heritage list by the Victorian branch of the National Trust on 2 October 2000.

== Description ==
=== Building ===
The ETA Foods Factory was designed by Romberg of Grounds Romberg and Boyd for the original owner, Nut Foods. The curtain wall of the administration building presented the public façade, and it was one of the most distinguished industrial buildings during the post-war period.

It is notable for the elegance of the handling of the Miesian curtain wall fronting Ballarat Road with alternating bands of clear and black glass, exposed tubular steel diagonal members picked out in gold matte paint and classical colonnade implied in the regular rhythm of structural columns. The building forms a façade to the more utilitarian sawtooth roof factory behind but is detached from it, separated by a landscaped courtyard garden and linked by a continuous cantilevered loading bay canopy which forms the fourth side of the courtyard.

The glass and aluminium construction continues around the sides and back giving the building a stand-alone integrity unusual for factory offices. A cantilevered, "floating" staircase enclosed by the glass wall forms the prominent entrance feature. A service tower stands above the roof line as a projecting geometric form that originally carryed the ETA brand name.

==== Architectural importance ====
The ETA Foods Factory is important for its futurist conception of the facade as billboard. The long curtain wall of the administration block facing Ballarat Road, with its brooding black vitrolite panels, is given added dynamism by the arrow-like diagonal bracing (originally finished in gold) that were used to lead the eye to supergraphic signage. The carpark / entry canopy is daringly wide, supported by an innovative cable structure tied back into the building and the ground of the courtyard. Other structural innovations include the tubular steel roof trusses designed by structural engineer John Connell.

The ETA Foods Factory was the only Australian design included in the 1962 seminal international publication on industrial design, Industriebau, published by the German Academy's Institute for Industrial Construction.

In the 1960s, the factory produced a unique Christmas illumination with a diorama of north pole scenery above the cantilevered veranda facing the side street, and Father Christmas appearing on his sled.

==== Contemporary use ====
The building fell into disrepair and was vandalised, including the removal of all the glass panes in about 2008. Purchased by car dealer Binks Ford in the late-1990s and intended to convert it into a showroom, the plans were not realised and property was listed for sale in 2008. Purchased by a property developer in 2011, the sale conditions required restoration of a remnant of the original buildings.

=== Landscape and sculpture ===
Integral to the design was an internal landscaped garden courtyard with a rock pool and fountain designed by John Stevens. A sculpture commissioned from Teisutis (Joe) Zikaras consists of two cast concrete sections of similar curving forms, placed one above the other in a delicate sense of balance on a basalt boulder at the base, and set in a circular concrete basin filled with water and edged with basalt boulders. Four copper discs on opposite sides were meant to direct water onto the sculpture but are not in working order. Remnants of the original integrated landscape design can be seen, including cactus and cordyline in the courtyard. Angular and zig-zag paths and pebble borders are only evident in fragments.

== See also ==
- Australian non-residential architectural styles
- List of places on the Victorian Heritage Register in the City of Maribyrnong
