= Douschka Pickens =

- Born: Francis Eugenia Pickens; March 14, 1859; Saint Petersburg, Russian Empire
- Died: August 18, 1893 (aged 34); Edgefield, South Carolina, U.S.
- Spouse: Dr. George Dugas
- Parent(s): Francis Wilkinson Pickens; Lucy Petway Holcombe Pickens

Francis Eugenia Olga Neva "Douschka" Pickens (later Dugas; March 14, 1859 – August 18, 1893) was the daughter of Francis Wilkinson Pickens, former Governor of South Carolina, and Lucy Holcombe Pickens. Born in the Russian Empire in 1859, rumor held that she was actually the daughter of Czar Alexander II.

Following the American Civil War, she was the dashing female leader in Edgefield County, South Carolina, in the Red Shirts movement. Douschka often wore a red cape and a red feathered plume in her hair. The Red Shirts blocked the polls to override the newly freed slaves votes in South Carolina to elect General Wade Hampton III in the 1876 governor election. She was nicknamed the "Joan of Arc of Carolina" for her leadership in the elections.

== Biography ==
Francis W. Pickens and his third wife, Lucy Holcombe, were married just prior to their departure for Russia following his appointment as Minister to the Russian Empire in 1858. The couple was popular among members of the imperial court and became intimate friends of the Russian czar and his wife. During their residence in Saint Petersburg, Lucy fell pregnant and soon gave birth to a daughter, Francis Eugenia, at the Winter Palace. The newborn daughter of the U.S. minister and his wife was christened with the names Olga and Neva, though she would come to be known as Douschka, a pet name meaning "little darling" in Russian said to have been given to her by the Empress Maria Alexandrova at her christening.

Douschka Pickens would marry Dr. George Couvier Dugas, a native of Augusta, Georgia. On December 18, 1884, she and Dugas gave birth to a son, Louis Alexander Dugas III. Douschka died in 1893 at the age of thirty-four after a sudden illness and is buried in Edgefield, South Carolina. Her son, Louis, would die nearly five years later on June 26, 1898, at the age of thirteen.
