= Frederick Romberg =

Swiss-trained architect (1913–1992)

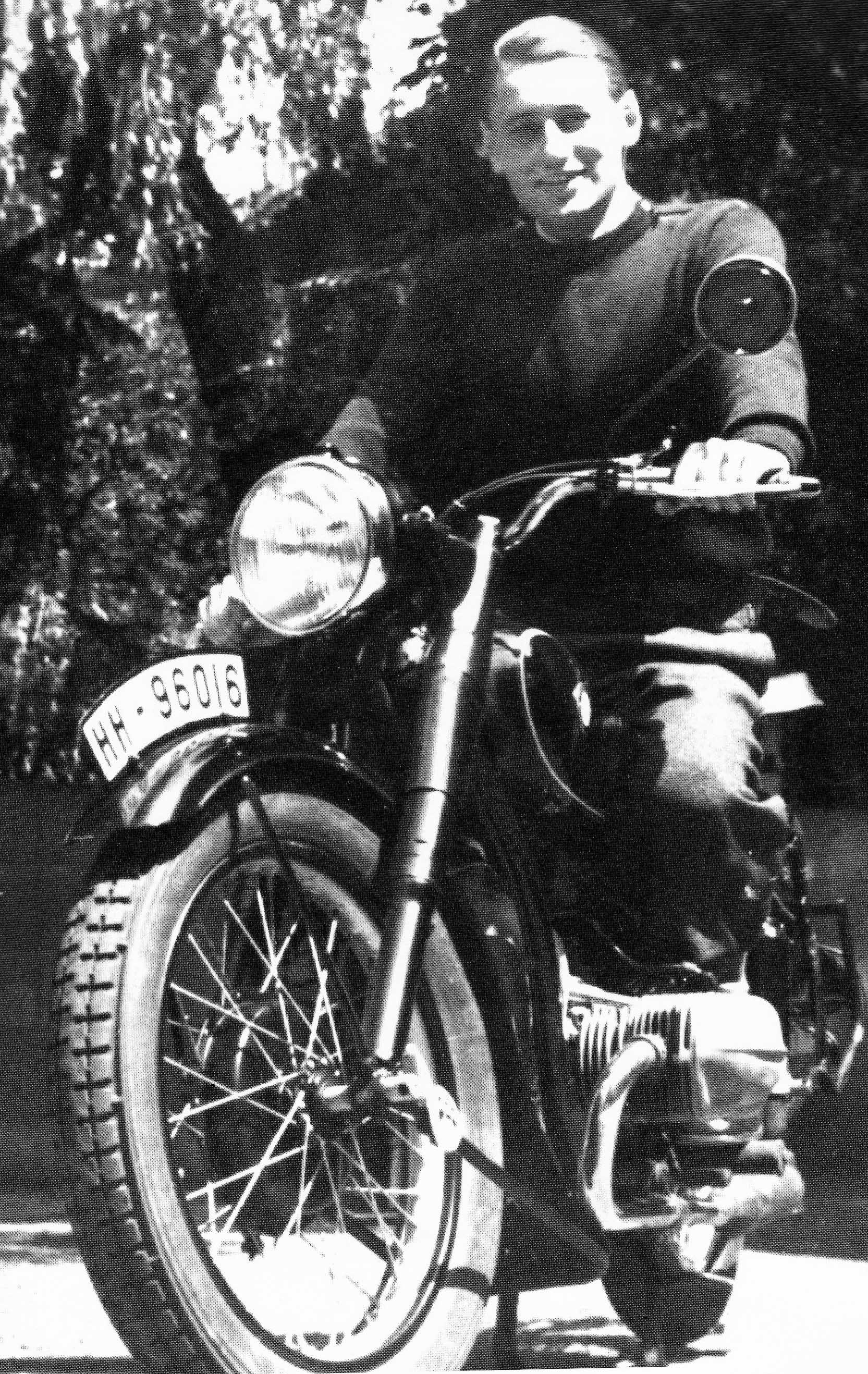
- Frederick Romberg in 1937
- Born: Friedrich Sigismund Hermann Romberg; 21 June 1913; Qingdao, China
- Died: 12 November 1992 (aged 79); Melbourne, Victoria, Australia
- Occupation: Architect
- Awards: Inaugural President's Prize, 2006 National Award for Enduring Architecture
- Practice: Grounds Romberg and Boyd (Gromboyd), later Romberg and Boyd
- Buildings: Stanhill Flats, Newburn Flats, ETA Foods Factory, MacFarland Library, Ormond College, ICI Staff Recreation Centre, Holy Trinity Lutheran Church

Frederick Romberg (21 June 1913, in Qingdao—12 November 1992, in Melbourne) was a Swiss-trained architect who migrated to Australia in 1938, and became a leading figure in the development of Modernism in his adopted city.

Romberg was best known as the "middle term" in the architectural partnership known as ‘Gromboyd‘, Grounds, Romberg and Boyd (1953–1962), as well as for some landmark apartment buildings in 1940s Melbourne. He brought an awareness of great European academic tradition, and the Modernist architecture of Switzerland and Germany, re-formed into architecture appropriate to Australia. His buildings are characteristically empiricist in intention and form, using local materials within the formal framework of modernism.

== Early life and education ==
Friedrich Sigismund Hermann Romberg, second child of Prussian parents Kurt and Else Romberg, was born on 21 June 1913 in Qingdao (Qingdao), the principal German colonial possession in China. His father worked in the Colonial Office, after a career as a doctor of law and a judge in Berlin. The family returned to Berlin in September 1913 when Frederick was only a few months old. When World War 1 broke out, his father volunteered, and was killed in 1915. In 1920 his mother married a doctor, Hans Riebling, and the family moved to the town of Harburg, adjacent to Hamburg. Here he attended the Stresemann Real-Gymnasium (now the Friedrich-Ebert-Gymnasium), where the principal Walter Schadow, was a supporter of Weimar Republic. As a teenager, he sought out the local avant-garde, like those at the Worpswede artist's colony north of Bremen, where he met Heinrich Vogeler. Here he would have seen architect Bernard Hoetger's Expressionist house, as well as his famous Böttcherstraße development in Bremen.

After his first studying law at the University of Geneva in Switzerland in 1931, and then at various other universities within Germany, and joined leftist student groups. He then swapped in 1933 to the architecture course at the Swiss Federal Institute of Technology (ETH-Zurich), one of the world's leading technical universities. The earlier semesters of the course had a strong component of technical subjects such as mathematics, geometry and building statics. He developed a remarkably consistent and rigorous language of architectural form, employing ribbon windows, cantilevers, roof gardens, open plans and new urban typologies. After graduating from ETH-Zurich, he joined Otto Rudolf Salvisberg's office as an architectural assistant for 6 months, working mainly on one project, a seven-storey laboratory building in Basel. Completing his studies in 1938, and fearful of returning to Germany because of his earlier student activism, he travelled to Melbourne that same year.

== Career ==
=== Early practice ===
Arriving in Melbourne at Station Pier, after failing to find work in Canberra and Sydney, he returned to Melbourne, and was immediately engaged by the large office of Stephenson and Turner. He was seconded to the design section and worked there for a year.

In 1939 he formed the partnership Romberg & Shaw with Mary Turner Shaw, a pioneering female architect 10 years his senior, who had also worked at Stephenson & Turner, administering various large projects. Together they designed and built a number of pioneering Modernist apartment buildings, introducing new approaches and styles to multi-family dwellings, including Yarrabee Flats (1940), Glenunga Flats (1940) and Newburn Flats (1939–41). They also designed a few houses such as his own in Eaglemont, and some of their designs included rustic elements such as exposed eave rafters and rubble stone piers. In 1940 he also became a registered architect.

The partnership ended in 1942 as the war made private practice impractical. Romberg then worked in various offices and spent a year interned as an ‘enemy alien’, returning to private practice in 1945 as soon as the war ended, the same year he was naturalised. He already had a very large project in hand, the landmark high-rise Stanhill Flats, designed as early as 1943, and built 1947–1950. The client was businessman and entrepreneur Stanley Korman, who commissioned a number of further schemes from Romberg which mostly came to nothing. One project that did get built was another flat development called Hillstan, on the Nepean Highway in Brighton, built in 1947, two long curving rows of two storey blocks joined by glazed stairwells.

=== Grounds, Romberg and Boyd: 1953—1962 ===
In 1951, Romberg's practice was in a precarious position. He had moved his office from La Trobe Street in 1949 to the front flat on the top floor of Newburn and the following year into a penthouse created from the roof garden.

In 1953 he joined up with two other noted modern architects, Roy Grounds and Robin Boyd, the partnership sometimes known as 'Gromberg', though they worked more or less separately.

The relationship of Romberg's work to be emerging Brutalist movement in England is one of the more intriguing aspects of his practice during the 1950s and early 1960s. Brutalism in Australia is generally understood as a style of ‘rational and robust’ concrete architecture, largely institutional, widespread in the 1960s and 1970s. Its forms derived from Le Corbusier's later work and the Japanese new architecture.

=== The breakup of the partnership ===
Roy Grounds' design won the competition for the National Gallery of Victoria and Cultural Centre project in 1963, which led to the breakup of the partnership at some personal cost. Both Boyd and Romberg believed the building would have been much more significant with the teamwork and contribution of all three.

In 1965, Romberg was appointed the foundation Professor of Architecture at the University of Newcastle and he held this position for the following decade.

=== Return to Melbourne ===
Romberg returned to Melbourne in 1975 where he carried on a small practice into the 1980s.

He died at his home in East Melbourne in November 1992.

== Key building and projects ==
=== Stanhill Apartments ===
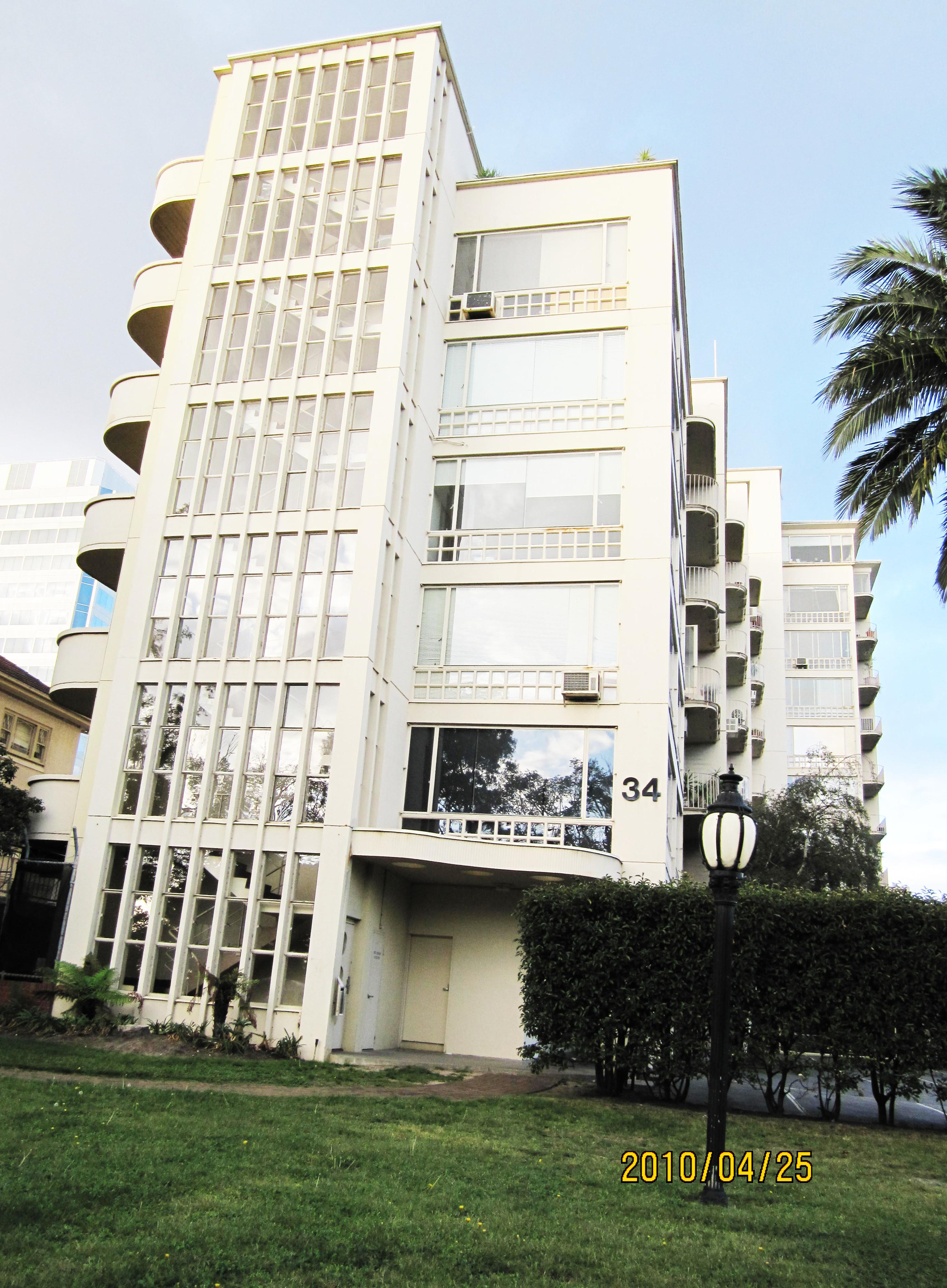
Stanhill Flats, view from Queens Road.

34 Queens Road, South Melbourne, Victoria; designed in 1943, built 1947–1950

The name Stanhill was first coined by Romberg as a combination of the names of the two brothers Stanley and Hilel Korman. It is a strong building with a powerful silhouette that responds positively to its urban context — multi-storied urban housing which is both eligible as dwelling and as modernist monument. The idea of a penthouse on the roof of the tall building was put forward at this time. The building was initially arranged in four vertical stacks containing 4, 5, 6 and 8 flats; the genesis of the present building. However, the scheme of the building has been changed three times due to the changes of local building regulations.

The building was awarded the 2025 Maggie Edmond Enduring Architecture Award by the Victorian Chapter of the Australian Institute of Architects, 75 years after construction.

=== Newburn Flats ===
30 Queens Road, South Melbourne, 1939–41

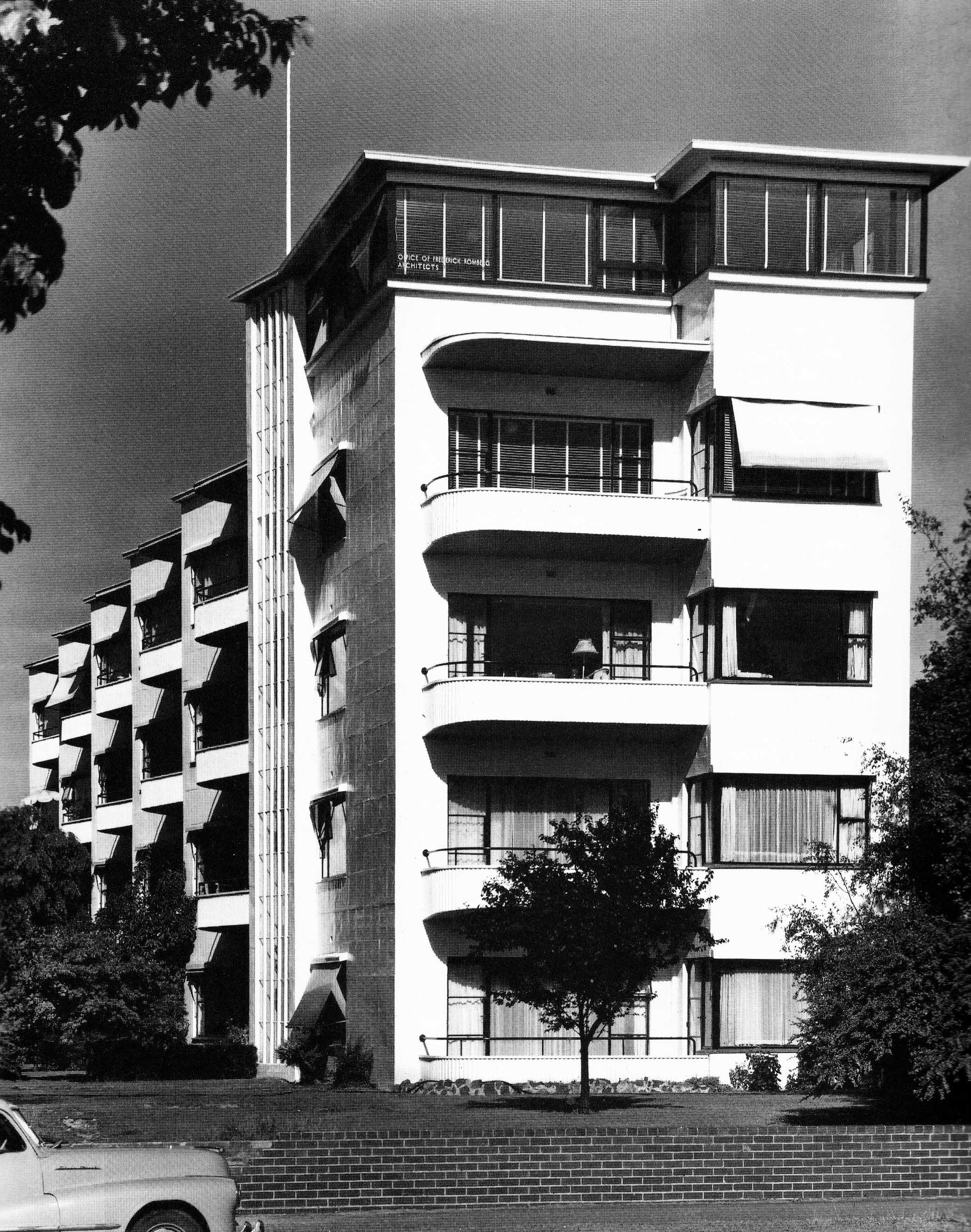
Newburn. Frederick Romberg's office was located for a time in the penthouse

The 26-year-old Romberg had been in Melbourne for little more than a year when he embarked on Newburn project. It was his first reinforced concrete multi—storey residential building. There are four storeys of twenty-four flats, with the living spaces on the sunny north side, each with an angled window bay and balcony so as to obtain a view towards Queens Road and park beyond. Stair towers at each end connect with access balconies on the south side. Romberg used the technology he was familiar with from his time in Salvisberg's office, reinforced concrete.

=== Picken Court, Ormond College ===
College Crescent, Parkville, 1959

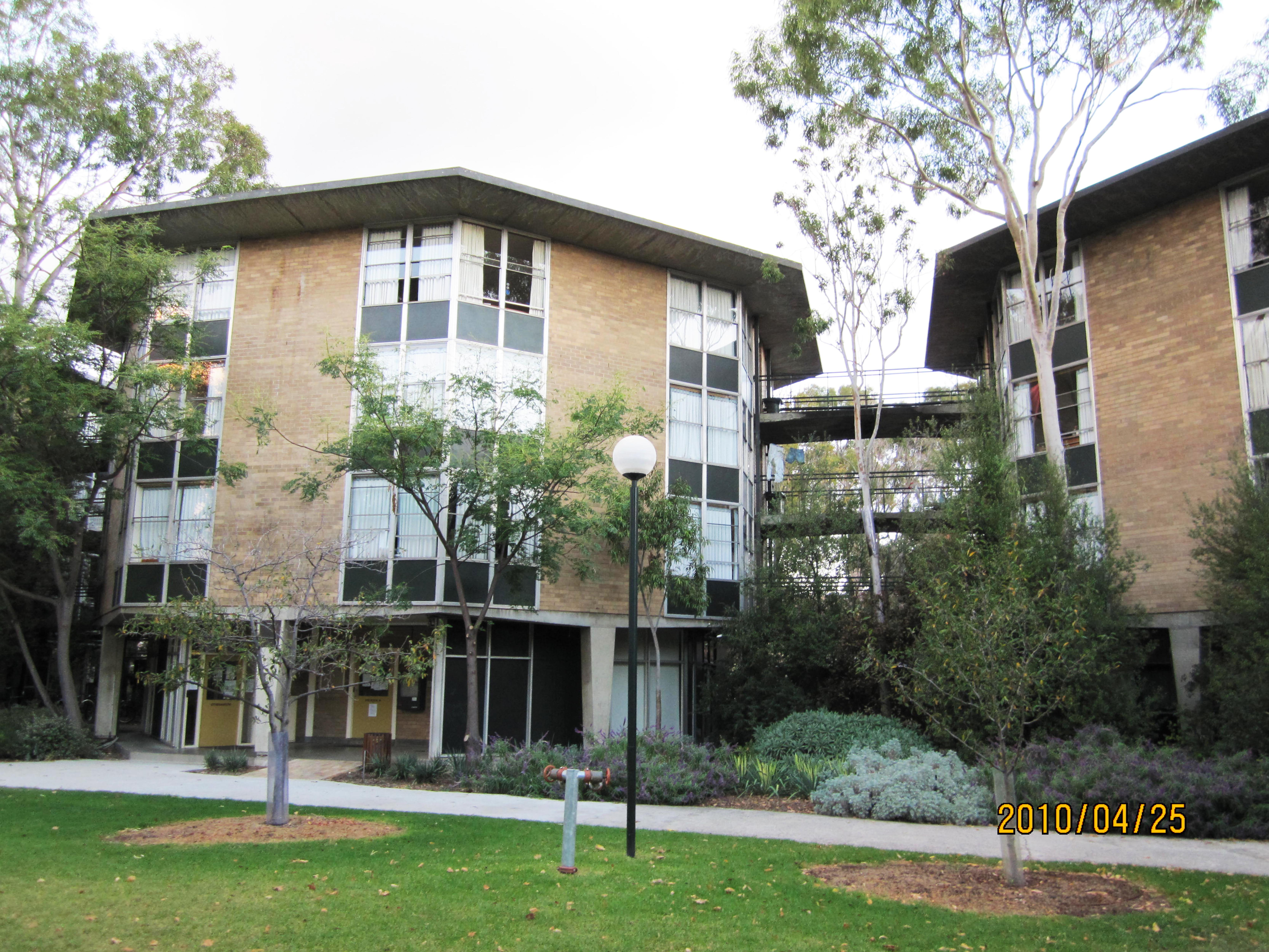
Picken Court, Ormond College, University of Melbourne

Picken Court is designed to be a student and staff facility comprising three octagonal building linked together at each of their three storeys by semi-enclosed bridges. Each had a radial plan with a light and ventilation shaft at its centre, a ring of toilets, laundries and other utilities, a passageway and students’ rooms, and common study areas around the perimeter. Picken Court was a rare fusion of a 19th-century form and contemporary ideas that elucidated the common theoretical bonds between the two.

=== ETA Foods Factory ===
254 Ballarat Road, Braybrook, 1957

ETA factory was designed for a client, Nut Foods, for the production of their ETA brand margarine. With its extremely long curtain wall presenting as the public façade, it was one of the most distinguished industrial buildings of the post-war period. At ETA is the handling of the curtain wall fronting Ballarat Road with its alternating bands of clear and black glass, tubular steel diagonal members (originally picked out in gold matte paint) and classical colonnade implied in the regular rhythm of expressed structural steel columns. Abandoned for many years, only part of the curtain wall facade and the entry courtyard area was retained when the majority of the factory space was replaced by a ‘big box’ retail building and carpark. Despite these changes, it is still considered one of the best post-war factories built in Victoria.

=== List of works ===
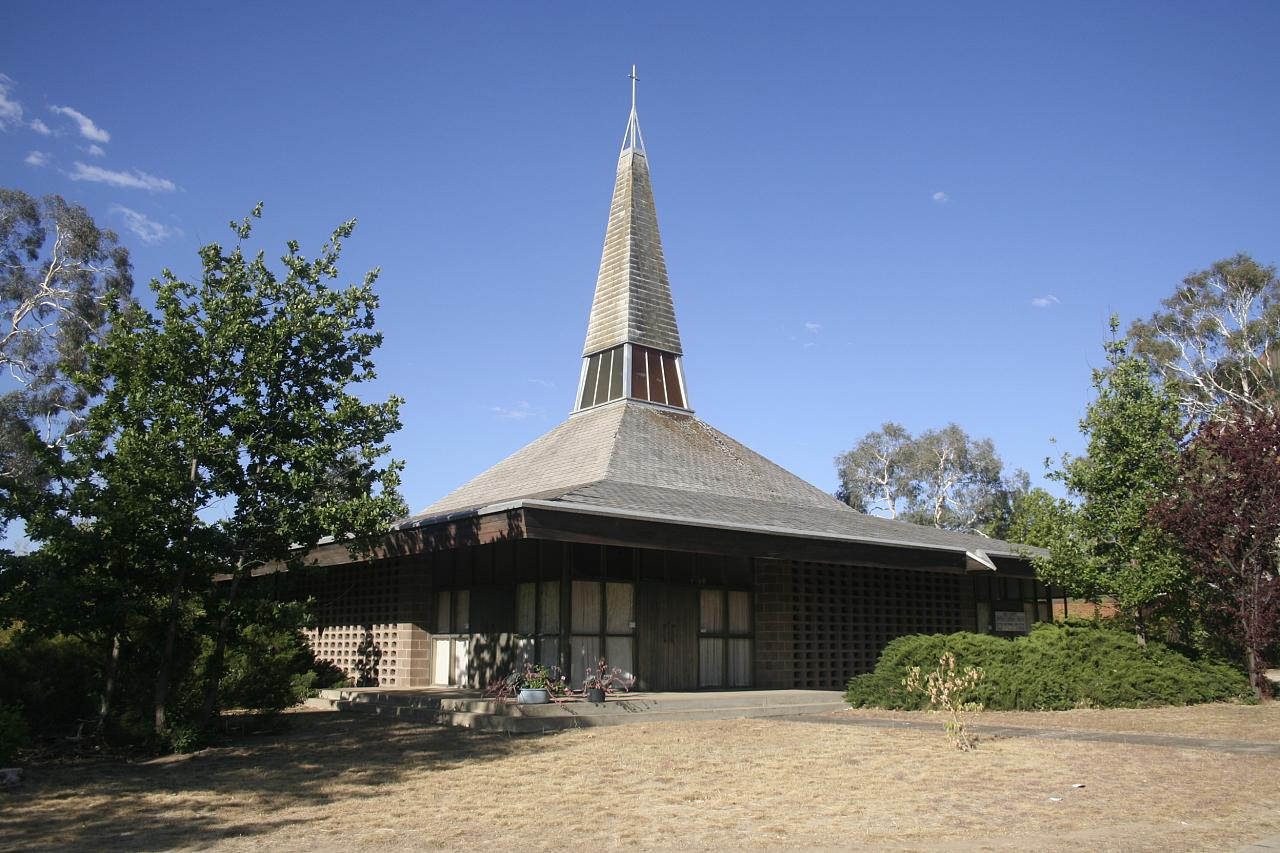
Holy Trinity Lutheran Church, Canberra (1960)

- Newburn Flats, 30 Queens Road, South Melbourne, 1939
- Yarrabee Flats, South Yarra, Victoria, 1940
- Glenunga Flats, Armadale, Victoria, 1940
- Romberg House, Eaglemont, Victoria, 1941
- St Quentin, Ellery House, Upwey, Victoria, 1941
- Miller-Short House, Upper Mast Road, Upwey, 1947
- Hilstan Flats, corner Nepean Highway and Marriage Road, Brighton, Victoria, 1947 (demolished)
- Stanhill Apartments, 34 Queens Road, South Melbourne, designed 1943, built 1947–1950
- Yarralands Flats, Hawthorn, Victoria, 1951
- Lutheran Church Hall, South Melbourne, Victoria, 1953 (demolished)
- Sacred Heart Girls' College building, Oakleigh, Victoria, 1954
- Harris Flats, Barkers Road, Hawthorn, 1955
- Bruck House, Bruck Mills, Wangaratta, Victoria, 1955
- ICI Staff Recreation Centre, Deer Park, Victoria, 1955 (demolished)
- ETA Foods Factory, 254 Ballarat Road, Braybrook, 1957
- CSIRO: Division of Protein Chemistry, Parkville, Victoria, 1958
- Picken Court, Ormond College, Parkville, 1959
- Holy Trinity Lutheran Church, Canberra, 1960
- St George's Anglican, East Ivanhoe, 1962
- MacFarland Library, and School of Microbiology of University of Melbourne, 1962
- Luther College, Croydon, 1963
- School of Architecture, University of Newcastle, New South Wales, 1968
- Newcastle City Council Offices, King Street, Newcastle, New South Wales, designed 1970, built 1972—1977 (with Wilson and Suters)
- Aboriginal Keeping Place, (now the Bangerang Cultural Centre), Shepparton, 1982

== Awards and recognition ==
- Inaugural President's Prize, awarded by Victorian Chapter of the Royal Australian Institute of Architects
- In 1998 the Vasey Crescent houses at Campbell, Canberra by Grounds Romberg & Boyd was awarded an ACT 25 Year Award.
- In 2001 the Australian Academy of Science (The Shine Dome) in Canberra was awarded an ACT 25 Year Award.
- In 2006 the Robin Boyd House II was awarded the Maggie Edmond Enduring Architecture Award and the National 25 Year Award by Royal Australian Institute of Architects.
- Since 2007 the Frederick Romberg Award for Residential Architecture, Multiple Housing is awarded annually at the Australian national architecture awards.
- In 2025 the Stanhill Apartments built in 1950 won the Maggie Edmond Enduring Architecture Award.
