= Cynthia Teague =

Australian architect and public servant

Cynthea Mary Teague MBE (22 May 1907 – 8 March 2007) was a pioneering Australian architect and public servant.

== Education ==
Born in Hawthorn, Victoria Teague attended Ruyton's Girls' School, Kew, from 1912 to 1923 and was awarded dux of her year.

Teague started her architectural education at Swinburne Technical College from 1924 to 1927. She then completed her studies at the University of Melbourne Architectural Atelier and was the only one to receive honours in her first year in 1928. Graduating in 1930 she was awarded the Grice Bronze Medal ahead of her peers, including highly regarded Alan Ralton. After her father paid her first year fees, Teague self supported herself through the subsequent years of training by winning scholarships.

== Career ==
=== Architectural practice ===
Whilst studying at Swinburne she was also articled to her family's firm Purchas & Teague and later joined George E. Nichterlein's office whilst studying at the University of Melbourne. At Nichterlein's, Teague completed several residences and the drawings for St John's Lutheran Church, South Melbourne, which she later reflected on in a short article entitled 'Modernism'.

Upon graduating Teague went to work for F. Keith Cheetham whose portfolio was overtaken by Edward Fielder Billson when Cheetham became ill in 1931. During this time she worked on office detailing, and designing and documenting flats and houses until Roy Grounds suggested that Teague apply for the recently vacated chief draftsperson's position at Oakley & Parkes. She commenced the role in 1934, soon becoming a senior draftsperson and in 1938 was promoted to the chief designer at Oakley & Parkes, where she designed and documented office buildings, flats, houses and factories.

When WWII broke out, fellow architect Mary Turner Shaw encouraged Teague to support the war effort by joining the Commonwealth Department of Works (CDW). Initially her role was in munitions designing bomb and shell-filling factories at Maribynong, Victoria and later shifted to designing and documenting pyrotechnics plants in Mulwala, NSW. In 1943 she moved to the Department of Works Post Office section designing and upgrading post offices and telephone exchanges for regional Australian towns as well as the new Brisbane GPO and the Redfern Mail Exchange. During this time she was also involved in Postwar construction including preliminary design work on the new City of Darwin and Commonwealth offices for Sydney and Melbourne.

After working on larger projects Teague joined the team for major projects and was largely responsible for the original designs of the Braddon Flats and an earlier iteration of the National Library, both in Canberra, and the Commonwealth Offices in Melbourne. She later worked on the Lismore and Sydney, Commonwealth Offices, and subsequently remarked that she enjoyed the complexity of office building design.

By 1959 Teague was promoted to Supervising Architect and became the Superintending Architect in 1960. In the same year she was seconded to a post overseeing work in Delhi, Myanmar and Malaysia with the Department of External Affairs. In 1964, Teague was promoted again into the role of Assistant Director General in the Commonwealth Department of works. From this position she was the first Australian woman elevated to the Second Division of the Public Service. In this role she worked on schools and housing in Darwin, the restoration of Custom's House, Melbourne, and the Springvale Hostel, and several other immigrant hotels, across Victoria.

=== Advocacy ===
In 1939, Teague was on Australian Institute of Architect's exhibition committee for an architectural display at the Home and Buildings Exhibition, which she later profiled in an article for the Journal of the Royal Victorian Institute of Architects.

After WWII when it was announced that female public servants would be returned to a lower rate of pay (after having parity with the men during the war) Teague and her colleagues strongly advocated against the changes without success.

=== Writing and teaching ===
In addition to lecturing at the Melbourne Technical College in Architectural Interior Design, from 1948 to 1950 Teague was the Honorary Editor of the RVIA Quarterly Bulletin.

== Key works ==
- St John's Lutheran Church, South Melbourne (1928) – documentation
- Kodak House, Collins St, Melbourne (1934), Oakley & Parkes – documentation
- Anzac House, Collins St, Melbourne (1938), Oakley & Parkes – documentation
- Malcolm Reid's Pty Ltd, Bourke St, Melbourne (1938) – documentation
- Woolworths, West Melbourne (1938) – documentation
- Gouge Pty Ltd, Brighton (1938) – alterations and documentation
- Lane's Motors, Exhibition St, Melbourne (1938) – design and documentation
- Commonwealth Offices, Spring St, Melbourne (1953), Commonwealth Department of Works – design
- Commonwealth Offices, Sydney (1953), Commonwealth Department of Works – design

== Awards and honours ==
- 1930 Grice Bronze Medal from the University of Melbourne's Architectural Atelier
- 1961 Fellow of the Royal Australian Institute of Architects
- 1961 Fellow of the Royal Victorian Institute of Architects
- 1971 Awarded the MBE for her services to the Commonwealth of Australia
