= Mary Turner Shaw =

Australian architect (1906–1990)

- Mary Turner (Mollie) Shaw
- Born: 14 January 1906; Caulfield, Melbourne, Victoria, Australia
- Died: 23 April 1990 (aged 84); St Kilda, Melbourne, Victoria, Australia
- Occupation: Architect
- Projects: Glenunga Flats, New Burn Flats, Yarrabee Flats

Mary Turner Shaw (1906–1990) was an Australian architect. She was born in Caulfield, Melbourne, Australia and is one of the first women to be employed as an architect in the early 1930s in Australia and thus pioneered new pathways for female architects. Her career is widely known for her working qualities that made her oversee many projects across Australia. She also became a distinct figure as an architectural historian, when she started publishing books and written articles. Her skills were diverse as she worked as a fashion designer, interior designer, project manager, public works architect and pioneer architectural librarian. As historian Geoffrey Serle described her, she was "a born writer and research historian with imagination, the ability to tell a story and define and ask fundamental questions".

== Early life and education ==
Shaw was born the youngest in the family from her three siblings of well established Western District graziers. Her great-grandfather, Thomas Shaw, and grandfather, Thomas Shaw junior, were distinct figures in leading the development of Australia's fine-wool industry. Her parents were Thomas Turner Shaw, Grazier (father) and Agnes May, Née Hopkins (mother). During her childhood, she lived at Wooriwyrite, a thirty-roomed house, on Mount Emu Creek near Mortlake, Victoria. From 1916 - 1922, she attended Clyde School at both its East St Kilda and Woodend (which she was later commissioned to alter in 1940 through Romberg & Shaw) campuses. During her adolescence, she showed skill in debating, dressmaking, drawing and piano and won many prizes, and after moving to London with her mother, she passed two entry exams, that gave entry to the University of Oxford.

== Architectural education and career ==
=== Architectural practice and training ===
Returning to Melbourne in 1925, Shaw pursued architecture and worked briefly without pay in a small firm. After which, she appealed to her friend, Ellison Harvie’s employer, Arthur Stephenson who agreed to employ her, with the help of her uncle, Oliphant Shaw. In this period, she also attended evening classes at the Working Men's College and enrolled in the (then) University of Melbourne Architectural Atelier (now University of Melbourne School of Design) in 1935. While working for Stephenson, she became well known for her capacity to administer and supervise large projects, particularly hospitals including St Vincent's (1933), the Mercy (1934, 1937-1939) and the Freemasons' (1935). Later, she became a supervising architect overseeing site work and also specialised in designing areas such as 'kitchens'.

In 1935, her Atelier studies were interrupted when she transferred to Sydney to assist with setting up a branch office. She went to Europe for a year, worked briefly in London with Stanley Hall, Easton & Robertson, and visited works of modernist architecture, Alvar Aalto and Willem Marinus Dudok. Upon returning to Melbourne in 1939, she formed a partnership with Frederick Romberg, Romberg & Shaw, administering and site supervision for Newburn Flats and Yarrabee Flats, which were early examples of functionalist architecture in Australia.

=== Public service ===
In 1939, Shaw worked for six months at the British Office for Works with the Air Raids Precautions Branch.

In 1942, she became the first woman architect employed by the Commonwealth government's Department of Works and later encouraged Cynthia Teague to join her. Her initial role for the Department was munitions factory design before working on kitchen design for the food services section and finally the Industrial Welfare Division. It was in the latter that her role shifted from design to planning and policy development.

In the early fifties, Shaw returned to the Public Works Department in Sydney, as the Architect-in-charge for the design and construction of Commonwealth Migrant Hostels.

=== Advocacy ===
In 1937, after setting up the Sydney Branch office for Stephenson, she was appointed associate member of the Royal Victorian Institute of Architects (RVIA). In 1942, Shaw became the chair of RVIA's House Committee, and in the following years continued in a number of roles with the organisation, which lead to her being awarded a fellow of both the RVIA and the Royal Australian Institute of Architects (RAIA) in 1965.

She also assisted with research into architectural practice issues during WWII as part of Melbourne's Architectural Research Group.

=== Architectural librarian ===
During 1950–1951, she worked for Bates Smart & McCutcheon, where she became the firm's technical information officer and worked on projects to construct prefabricated hospitals. After a brief return to the Public Works Department, Shaw returned to Melbourne to join Buchan Laird & Buchan, where she undertook architecture work as well as establishing an architectural library where she developed many procedures for control and retrieval. It was the latter that led to her rejoining Bates Smart McCutcheon in 1956, becoming the first full-time architectural librarian, a role that involved collecting technical information and archived plans and drawings, before retiring in 1969.

=== Architectural historian ===
From 1968 on, even after retiring from architecture, she was highly sought after by consultants in architectural information organisation and retrieval. Mary then started her second career as a historian. In 1969 she wrote, On Mount Emu Creek, which is a description of ‘the closed Western District of a past era’. In 1972, she wrote The Builders of Melbourne: The Cockrams and Their Contemporaries regarding historical architecture events in Melbourne. After which, she wrote five articles for the Australian Dictionary of Biography. In 1987, she wrote Yancannia Creek, which was described as her greatest achievement.

== Key building and projects ==
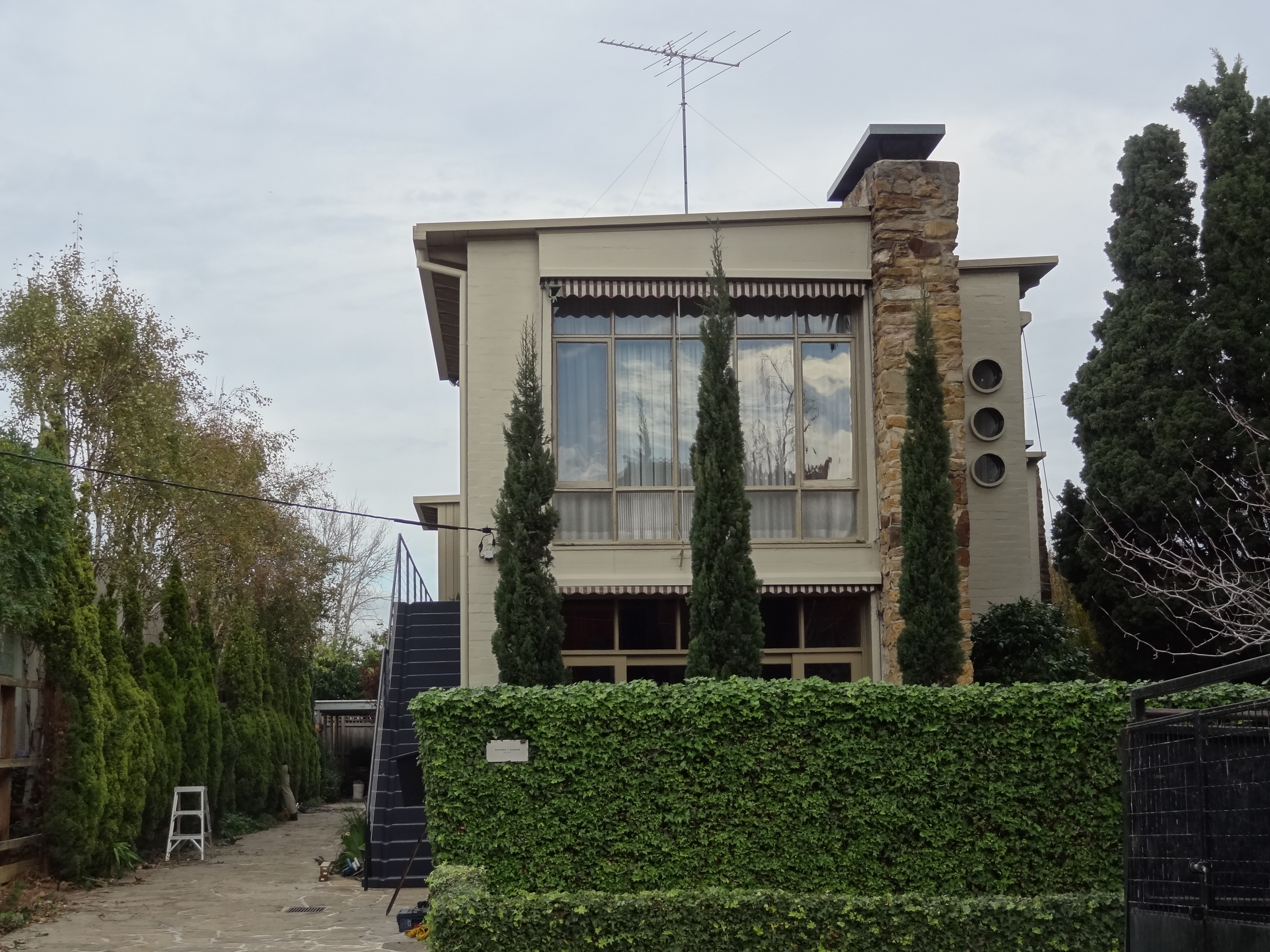
Glenunga Flats' Front View

=== Glenunga Flats ===
Designed in 1940 Architect: Frederick Romberg and Mary Turner Shaw Located: 2 Horsburgh Grove, Armadale

In the first decades of the 20th century, and gaining momentum after World War I, apartment buildings started to appear in Melbourne. The residents’ ways of life, personal and social, were negatively impacted by the war in Australia, and it worsened into a housing shortage as the population increased. Low number of houses was built during war, and terrace houses were not readily accepted anymore. As such, the building of residential apartments was considered to be one possible way to resolve the problem of shortage.

There was a rapid growth in the apartment construction activities in the late 1920s. And driven by that growth, South Yarra and Toorak started to give in to what Wilde (1999:40) describes as "the combined pressures of probate, depression and profit". However, this led to unhappiness among the residents who spoke out against flats, stressing that flats destroyed the personality of South Yarra and Toorak. Eventually, a by-law was passed by Prahran Council in 1933, putting in increased regulations over various aspects of flat building, such as building height and construction standards. Additionally, several new housing estates even came out with stipulations banning the building of apartments.

==== Modernism and influence ====
In the late 1930s and early 1940s the influence of European modernism began to be apparent in the design of apartment buildings in Melbourne. Glenunga flats was one of the first, designed by Frederick Romberg together with his partner Mary Turner Shaw in 1939, which "broke new ground in the manner flat development was arranged" (Lewis and Foster, 1992: 205).

==== Place history ====
Glenunga flats, which is located at 2 Horsburgh Grove, Armadale, was owned by Carl and Constance Stratman. This building was completed in 1940 and was designed by architects Frederick Romberg and Mary Turner Shaw. Before war regulation that stopped all of the buildings, both architects—Frederick Romberg and Mary Turner Shaw performed the last private commission for Glenunga. Carl Stratman was the brother of Dr. Paul Startman; when he immigrated to Australia, Romberg travelled on the ship Mosel.

==== Physical description ====
The entry side in the functional plan of Glenunga flats is divided with driveway and external stairs, originating from the garden. Its linear planning produced four flats with four rooms in each of the flats. Glenunga flats are also of approximately the same size as the surrounding single residential buildings. Plants dominate as Glenunga are covered by Canary Island Palm at the front, with their boundary wall covered in ivy and is visible from the front. On the other hand, the boundary to the garden is marked by conifers.

Romberg and Shaw's way of defining the International Style was different as they included stones and bricks, instead of going with plain white form. The inclusion of stones and bricks did provide softening touch to the International Style, as it added colour and texture, unlike the Style. Nevertheless, there are still the flat roof structure and modelling of form which are still retained in the Style, including the stepped planning which strives for privacy for the residents.

The stone wall goes up and beyond the roof line, forming the European chalet style chimneys. With that said, the rear flats also follow this feature. From the internal perspective, the stone walls are probably structured as fireplaces, in every such flat. Furthermore, it is worth noting that Glenunga has the angled glass bays which are associated with Romberg's admiration for Alvar Aalto's Villa Mairea, Finland in 1937–1938.

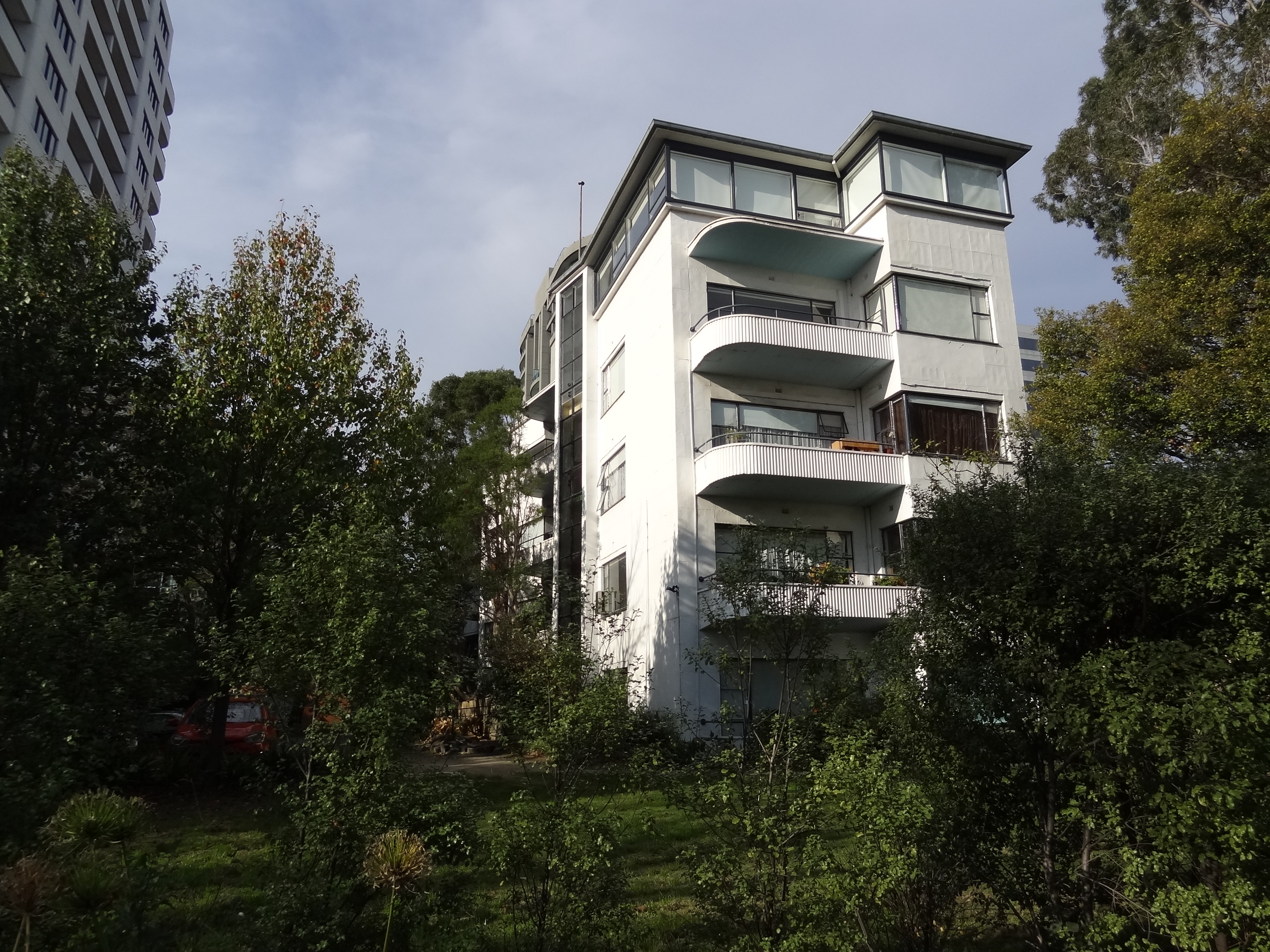
Newburn Flats on 30 Queens Road View

=== Newburn Flats ===
Designed in 1939 Architect: Frederick Romberg with his partnership Mary Turner Shaw and Richard Hocking Located: 30 Queens Road, Melbourne

==== History and description ====
Designed as bachelor flats, four-story Newburn was created in 1939 by Romberg, Shaw, et al. The first design was changed in order to make it more cost-effective and fulfil client's fresh requirements. The style of the Newburn is new, incorporating the design to raise the privacy of the balconies, views and provide a north orientation. At the same time, it takes in the Expressionist's curved elements without leaving out the Mendelsohn's bold horizontals. These eventually create a more artistic external to the plan that is overly-focused on functions.

For its structure, modular steel forms (for its walls and slabs) are used together with bent corrugated steel for the balconies. With wanting to include arts to the building, following the steps of the Swiss, Gert Sellheim was appointed to handle the matter of having colourful sundial on the main front wall and Aboriginal paintings in the entrance porches. Another major component of the design is the bold colours on important elements, in contrast with the creamy white walls. Moving forward, modifications were implemented on the front rooftop pergola, painting, and internal finishes and fittings. Using glazed in the rooftop pergola at the front of Newburn with cantilevered balconies; Romberg attempted to construct a penthouse flat and office. The balconies remind Romberg about the place which he used to live while designing Newburn.

==== Statement of significance ====
Being one of the first blocks of apartments to reflect the innovative Europe-style architecture at the time, Newburn comes with an offset plan reminiscent of Berlin housing zone by Gropius. It has elements of design that are associated with Mendelsohn's Expressionism and detailing of the interior. Furthermore, being the first block which has exterior of concrete, it was not similar to other buildings of the time which used the trend curved elements, hipped roof and stuccoed brickwork to maintain the exterior which had been reorganised. Newburn was ahead of its time and sophisticated, and the architect associated with it, Frederick Romberg eventually started his own design company with Roy Burman Grounds and Robin Boyd.

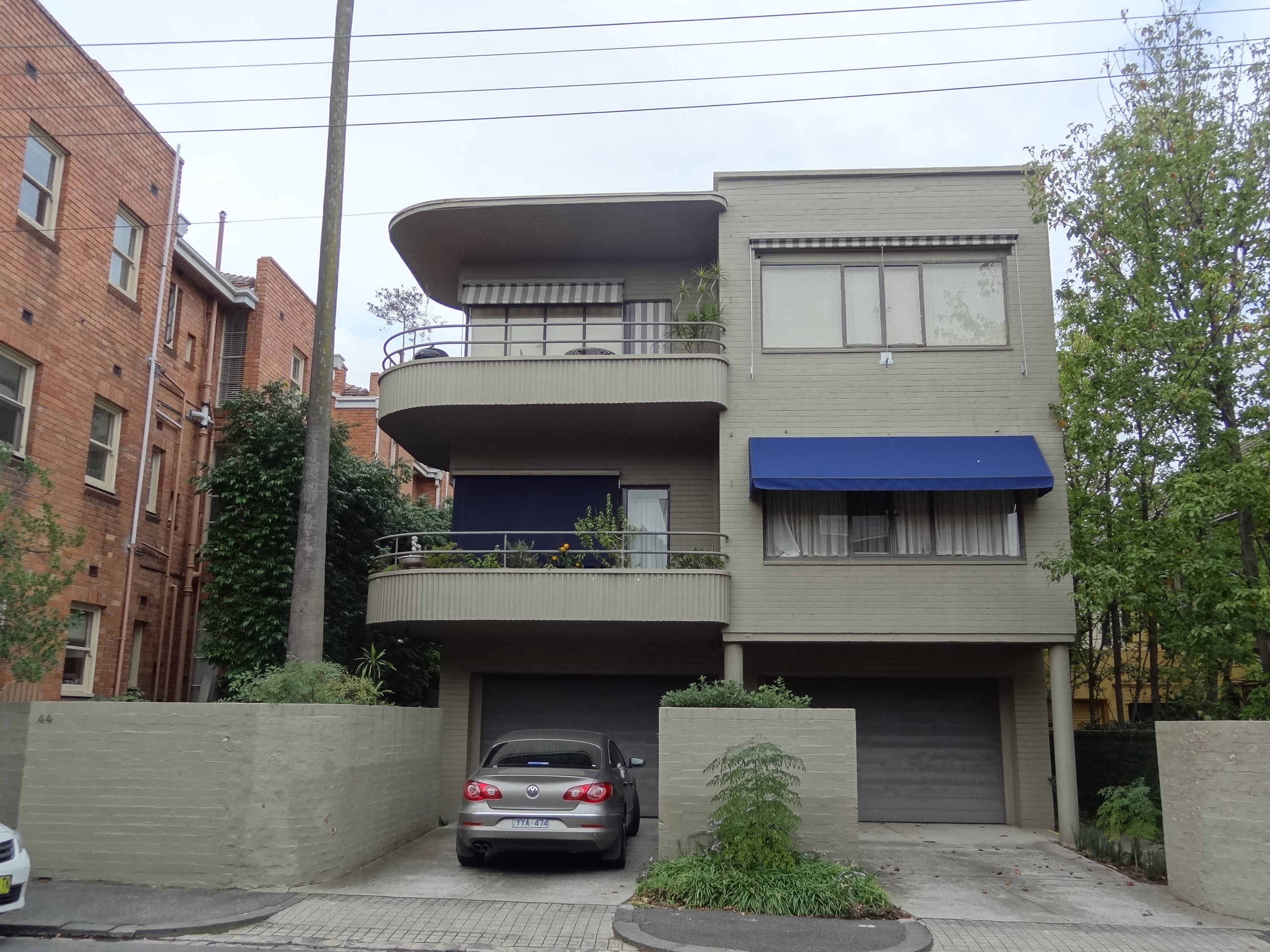
Yarrabee Flats's front view

=== Yarrabee Flats ===
Designed in 1940 Architect: Frederick Romberg and Mary Turner Shaw Located: 44 Walsh St, South Yarra, Melbourne, Australia

==== History and description ====
Yarrabee flats was built for two musicians and it was a block of five flats which is located particularly in South Yarra. It is noticeably in the style of Romberg's student work with crisp rectangular blocks build on large windows, stripped awnings, pilotis and cantilevered corner balconies recalled by corrugated ironwork form work. Yarrabee built in unrendered brick rather than white concrete and in the large living room has a huge stone chimney.

==== Similar buildings ====
Yarra Flats has elements found on other Romberg & Shaw, but the arrangement and variety is unique to this block. and Newburn Flats. It has the thrusting, curved cantilevered balconies seen at Newburn, as well as the distinctive edging formed by corrugated iron. The curved floating canopy at the entry pierced by circular skylights reappears on a much larger scale at Stanhill, designed the year before but not built until the later 40s.

==== Key of influence ====
Yarrabee Flats has carving quality and it gives the character to European modernist architecture. It shows curved lines and bold horizons in those elements. It also can be seen by the inspiration of the work of Erich Mendelsohn and Walter Gropius (the Berlin Housing state).
