= Pickens =

Pickens may refer to:

== People ==
- Pickens (surname)

== Places in the United States of America ==
- Pickens, Mississippi
- Pickens, Oklahoma
- Pickens, South Carolina
- Pickens, Texas
- Pickens, West Virginia
- Pickens County, Alabama
- Pickens County, Georgia
- Pickens County, South Carolina
