= Armistead Burt =

American politician

Member of the U.S. House of Representatives from South Carolina's 5th district
- In office March 4, 1843 – March 3, 1853
- Preceded by: Francis W. Pickens
- Succeeded by: James L. Orr

Member of the South Carolina House of Representatives
- In office 1838–1841
- In office 1834–1835

Personal details
- Born: November 13, 1802 Edgefield County, South Carolina
- Died: October 3, 1883 (aged 80)
- Party: Democratic
- Profession: lawyer, planter

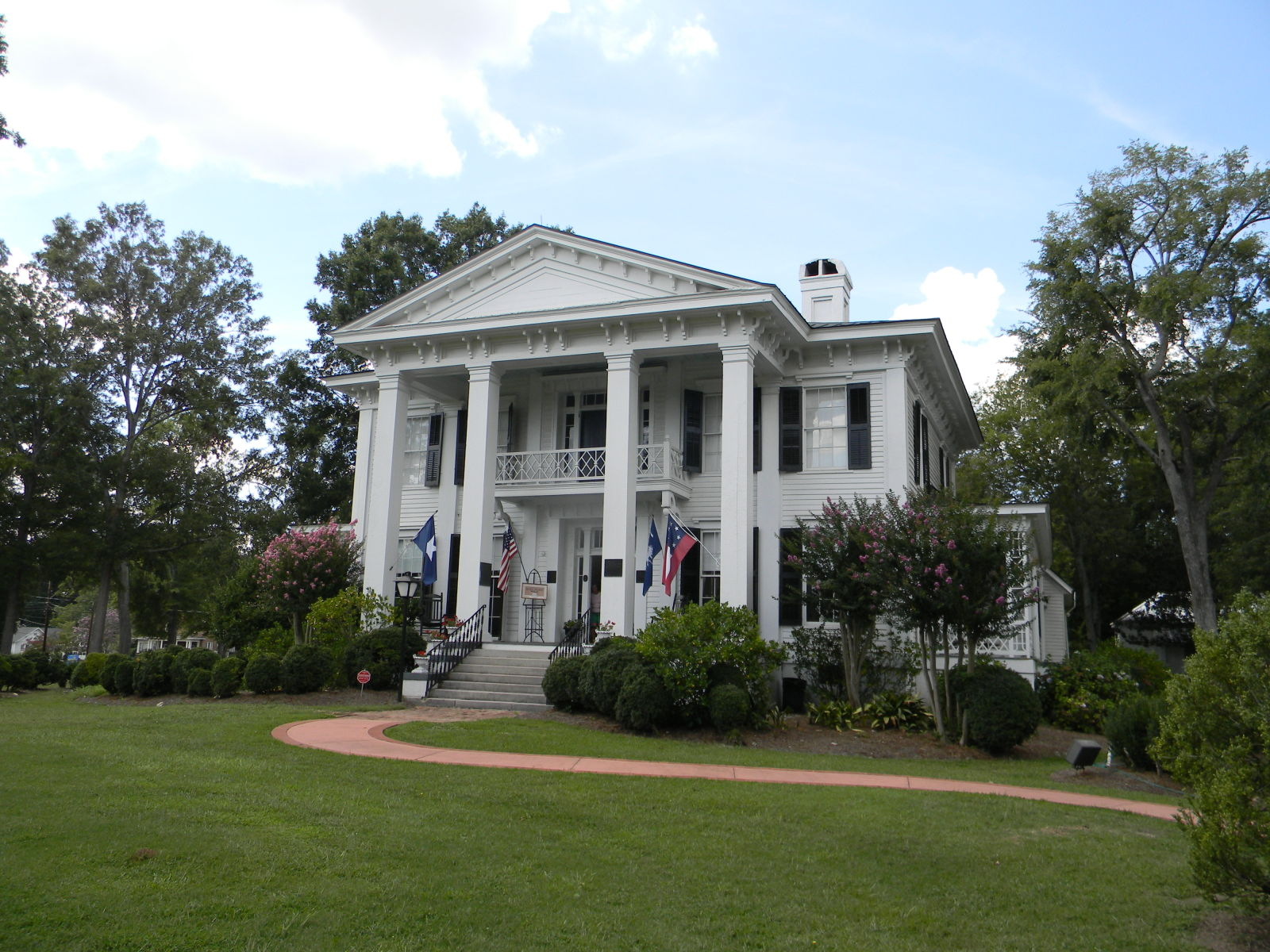
The Armistead Burt House in Abbeville, South Carolina.

Armistead Burt (November 13, 1802 – October 30, 1883) was a planter, slaveholder and U.S. representative from South Carolina.

Born at Clouds Creek, near Edgefield, Edgefield County, South Carolina, Burt moved with his parents to Pendleton, South Carolina. One of his brothers was future Civil War officer Erasmus Burt. He completed preparatory studies. He studied law. He was admitted to the bar in 1823 and practiced in Pendleton. He moved to Abbeville, South Carolina, in 1828 and continued the practice of law. He also engaged in agricultural pursuits. He served as member of the South Carolina House of Representatives from 1834 to 1835, and 1838–1841.

Burt was elected as a Democrat to the Twenty-eighth and to the four succeeding Congresses (March 4, 1843 – March 3, 1853). He served as chairman of the Committee on Military Affairs (Thirty-first and Thirty-second Congresses). He served as Speaker pro tempore of the House of Representatives during the absence of Speaker Winthrop in 1848. He was not a candidate for renomination in 1852. He resumed the practice of law in Abbeville. He served as delegate to the Democratic National Convention in 1868. He died in 1883. He was interred in Episcopal Cemetery.

== Sources ==
- United States Congress. "Armistead Burt (id: B001145)". Biographical Directory of the United States Congress.

U.S. House of Representatives
Preceded by Francis W. Pickens	Member of the U.S. House of Representatives from South Carolina's 5th congressional district 1843–1853	Succeeded by James L. Orr
