= Kenneth Ross =

Kenneth Ross may refer to:

- Kenneth Ross (screenwriter), Scottish-American screenwriter
- Kenneth Bruce Ross (1897–1959), American inventor and businessman
- Ken Ross (cyclist) (1900-1974), Australian road and track cyclist
- Kenneth G. Ross (born 1941), Australian playwright and screenwriter
- Ken Ross (footballer) (1927–2004), Australian rules footballer
- Kenneth A. Ross (born 1936), American mathematician
- Kenneth A. Ross Jr. (1923–2004), member of the California Assembly
- Ken Ross (bishop) (born 1964), American Anglican bishop
- Ken Ross (rugby union) (1937–2021), Scottish rugby union player
- Kenneth R. Ross (born c. 1959) Scottish academic
- Kenny Ross (born 1970), Scottish shinty player
