= Kenneth Bruce Ross =

American businessman

Kenneth Bruce Ross (August 21, 1897 – July 12, 1959) was an inventor and businessman who is best known for the development of an automated manufacturing process for the reliable production of quartz crystals used in radios.

== Life history ==
Kenneth Ross was born in Oklahoma, but spent most of his childhood living with his uncle in Colorado. He lied about his age to join the US Army. His first posting was in Williams, Arizona. As part of his Army service, he fought against Pancho Villa. During his time in the Army, Ross was fortunate enough to work with the Marconi radios utilized by the Signal Corps.

Shortly after the completion of his military service, Ross moved to Chicago where he founded the Ross Manufacturing Company. Its primary product was the production and installation of radio components and systems. Customers included such notables as the P.K. Wrigley family. While installing a custom made radio system in their Chicago home, he met his future wife Gudrun Saetveit, a concert pianist providing instruction to the Wrigley children.

Kenneth Ross was an aviation enthusiast, who counted Charles Lindbergh as one of his friends. Ross owned several airplanes throughout his life. He was killed on July 12, 1959 in Durango, Colorado after the airplane he was piloting crashed shortly after takeoff.

== Business ==
The Ross Manufacturing Company employed approximately 500 people. In order to satisfy the communications demands of Allied Forces during World War II, Ross converted one of his plants in Chicago to a facility for making FT-243 crystal units. Ross developed a process to automatically and accurately tune the FT-243 quartz crystals in a shorter time while using far less labor. Prior to the development of his process, all crystals had to be polished by hand in order to ensure proper tuning. As a result, his factory was able to produce more high quality radio crystals faster than most other companies in the US. Ross never patented the process. It was shared freely with other radio crystal manufacturers as he deemed it his patriotic duty. Ross produced a short technical film detailing each step in the process, making it possible for others to easily copy it. His production method had a direct impact on the improved reliability of radio communications in both European and Asian theaters of war.
