= Picking =

Picking or Pickings may refer to:

== Activities ==
- Fruit picking
- Guitar picking, various techniques for playing a guitar
- Lock picking, the art of unlocking a lock without the original key
- Nose picking, the act of extracting mucus and/or foreign bodies from the nose
- Skin picking, or Dermatillomania
- Continental knitting, a style of knitting also known as picking
- In computer graphics, the task of determining which screen-rendered object a user has clicked on
- Order picking, in logistics the task of selecting an item for shipment

== People ==
- Jake Picking (born 1991), American actor
- Jonti Picking (born 1975), British web personality and flash animator
- Sherwood Picking (1890–1941), United States Navy officer

== Other uses ==
- Pickings, another word for plunder
- Pickings (film), a 2018 neo-noir film
