= Newburn Flats =

Coordinates: 37.842861°S 144.975866°E

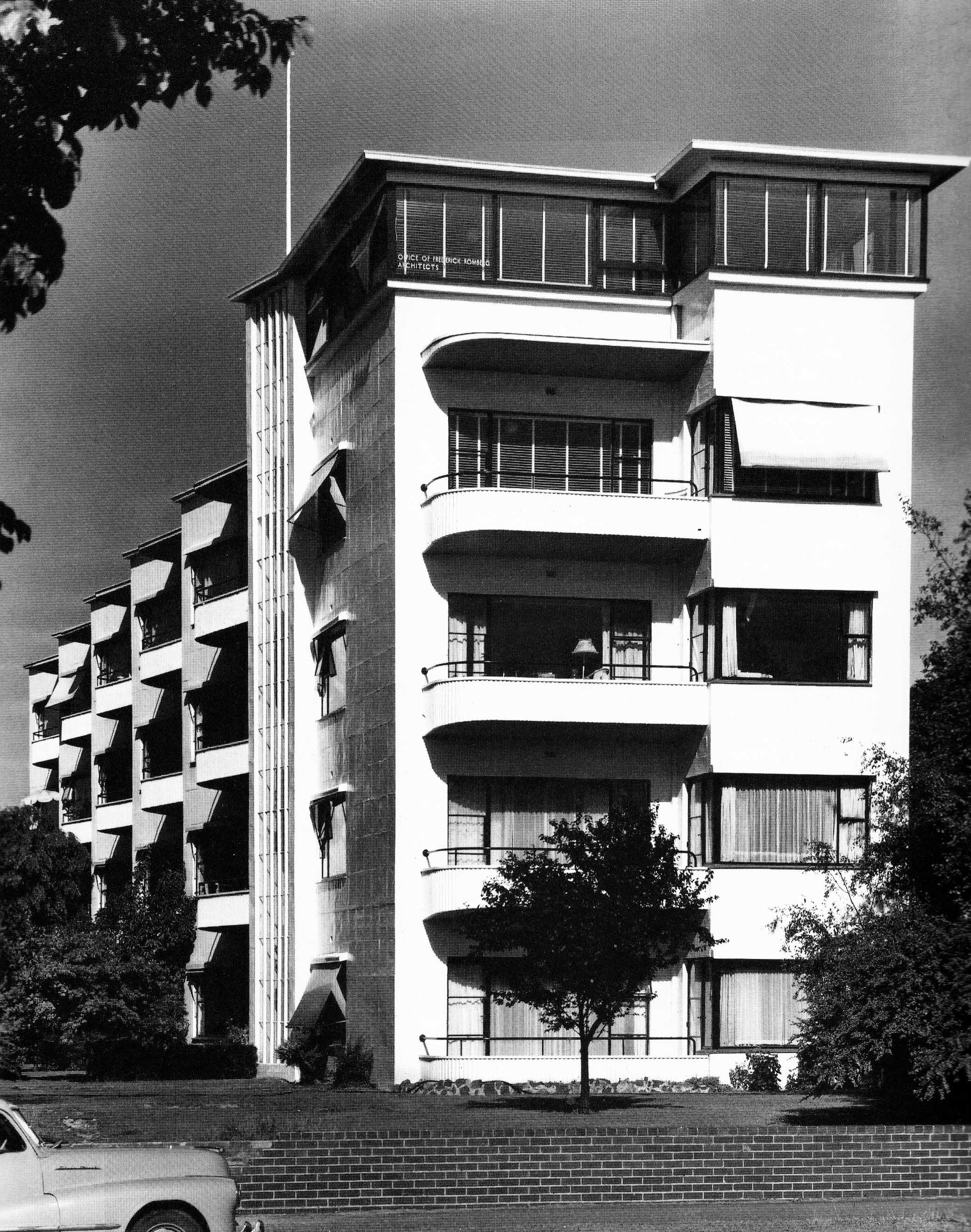
- Interactive map of the Newburn Flats area

General information
- Architectural style: Mid 20th century Expressionism
- Location: 30 Queens Road, Melbourne, Australia
- Completed: 1941

Design and construction
- Architects: Frederick Romberg, Mary Turner Shaw
- Architecture firm: Romberg & Shaw

Newburn Flats is an apartment building located at 30 Queens Road, Melbourne. It is considered one of the first examples of European Modernist ideals applied to multi-unit residences in Australia. It was designed by the firm Romberg & Shaw (Frederick Romberg and Mary Turner Shaw) in 1939 and completed in 1941.

== History ==
Frederick Romberg, from a German family and with an architecture degree from Switzerland, decided to leave tumultuous European politics behind by migrating to Australia in 1938. He settled in Melbourne and immediately got a job at the large firm of Stephenson and Turner, and in February 1939 married fellow migrant Verena Sulzer. The 26-year-old Romberg had been in Melbourne for little more than a year when, with the help of Bernard Gore Brett, set up Newburn P/L with his father-in-law Dr. Sulzer, in order to buy and redevelop a site on Queens Road as investment flats. The name came from the Victorian mansion on the block named Newburgh, after a town in Fife.

At first Romberg remained at Stephenson & Turner, however as the project became more demanding he made the decision to resign, and set up office in Collins Street, in partnership with Richard Hocking also from Stephenson's, because Romberg was not yet a registered architect. Hocking left the partnership after only a few months and Romberg invited another Stephenson employee, Mary Turner Shaw, also known as Mollie Turner Shaw, who had experience managing large projects. This partnership lasted only a few years.

A building contract was signed in March 1940 at £18,625 however with additional fees including architect and land the total investment came to £29,000. The lowest tenderer was a builder named Jack Aird, a former boxer and punter and quite supportive of the young architect.

The outbreak of war in September 1939 did not at first affect building projects, but construction was delayed and difficulties in finding materials arose, and it was not finished until early 1941. Romberg sued the builder, invoking penalty clauses, and settled out of court. The development was not a financial success.

There have been subsequent alterations apart from finishes and fittings; the rooftop pergola was replaced by a penthouse in the 1950s, the penthouse served as Romberg's architectural office while working on the nearby Stanhill project. The block was sold in 1957, and the flats were strata-titled and sold individually in the 1970s. The building remains structurally in good condition. The building was added to the Victorian Heritage Register in 1984, one of the earliest Modernist buildings to be added. In 2019-20 a comprehensive program of repairs and restoration was carried out.

== Layout ==
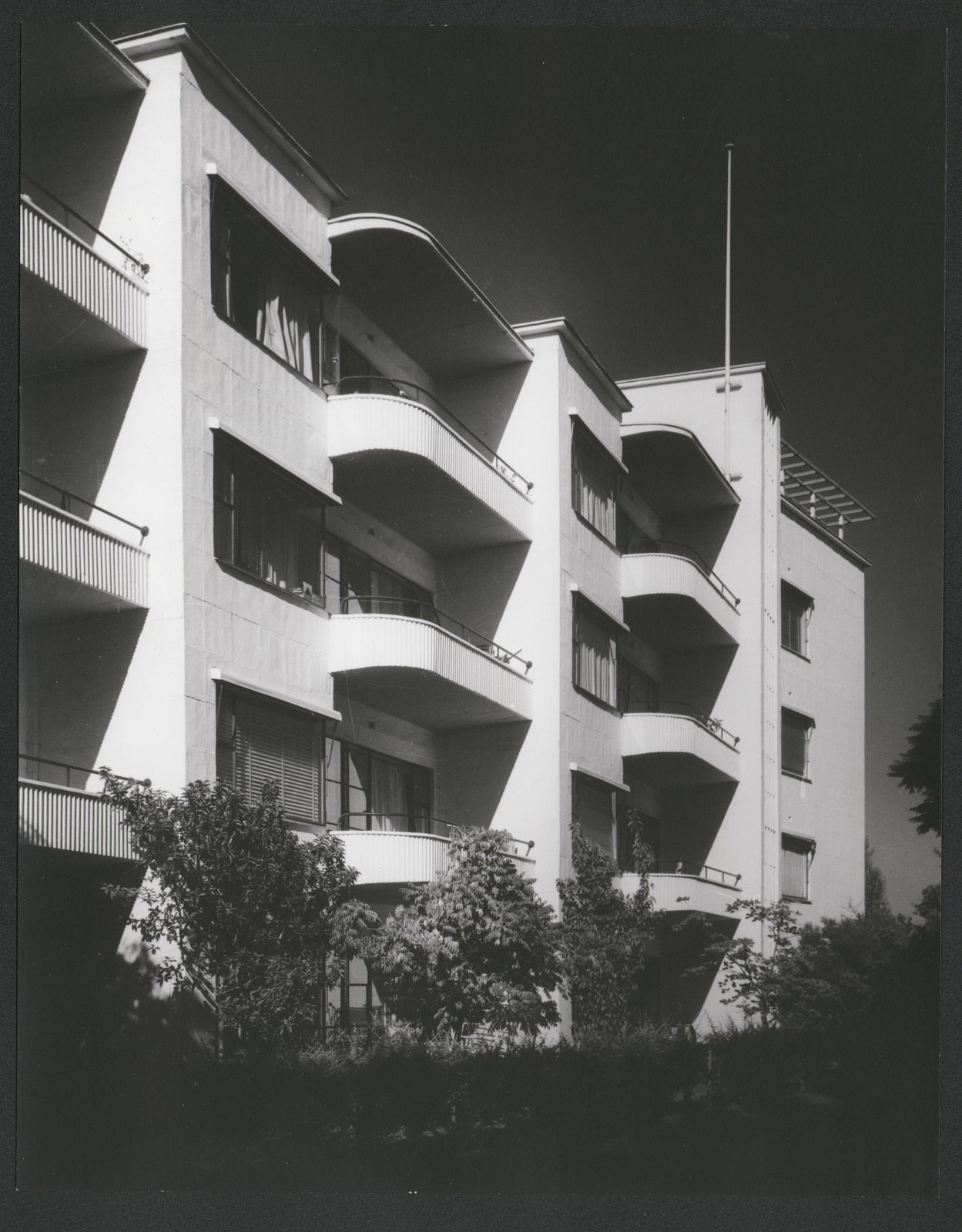
Newburn balconies from east 1951

Floor plan

The initial design was altered to increase the rental profit by adding an extra bedroom to the front four flats and twisting them to face Albert Park, topped by a rooftop garden. These four apartments were separated from the rest of the units by a glazed stairwell. The angular or staggered planning of the flats allowed greater privacy to its occupants whilst allowing an outlook to the extensive garden, aided by placing the block on the southern boundary. All circulation was via the lift/stairwells at each end and open access balconies on the rear.

== Construction ==
The construction method was new for apartment blocks in Australia, with the entire structure composed of bare concrete, a technique already much established in Switzerland. For formwork they used 600 square steel shutters and poured in 600 lifts, whilst for the curved balconies edges corrugated iron formwork was used, providing a variation in texture.

Borrowing from the common practice in Swiss design to incorporate art, Romberg enlisted Gert Sellheim, a commercial artist with whom he had collaborated for the New Zealand pavilion. Aside from the standard numbers on the door, Sellheim painted an individual aboriginal motif for each of the 25 flats and a colourful sundial on the external wall. Since they were prone to fading pigments and ongoing vandalism, when the flats were finally sold in 1957, the new owner had the motifs painted over. Another significant feature was the individual colour scheme of the complex. Contrasting the creamy-white exterior walls were the small highlights of blue and yellow on the window frames and mullions, whilst the rear garage doors featured a bold blue-and-cream chequered pattern.

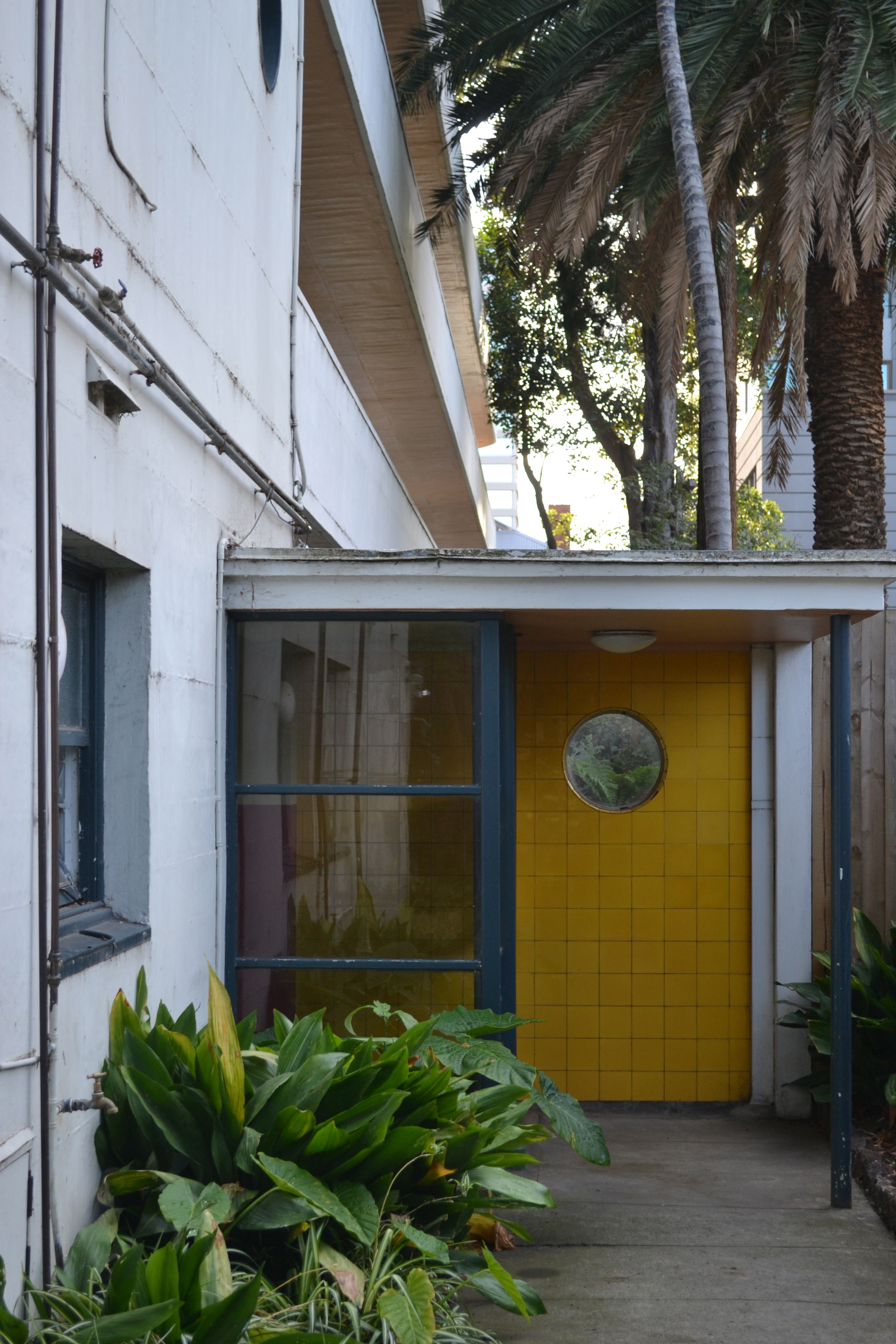
Entry

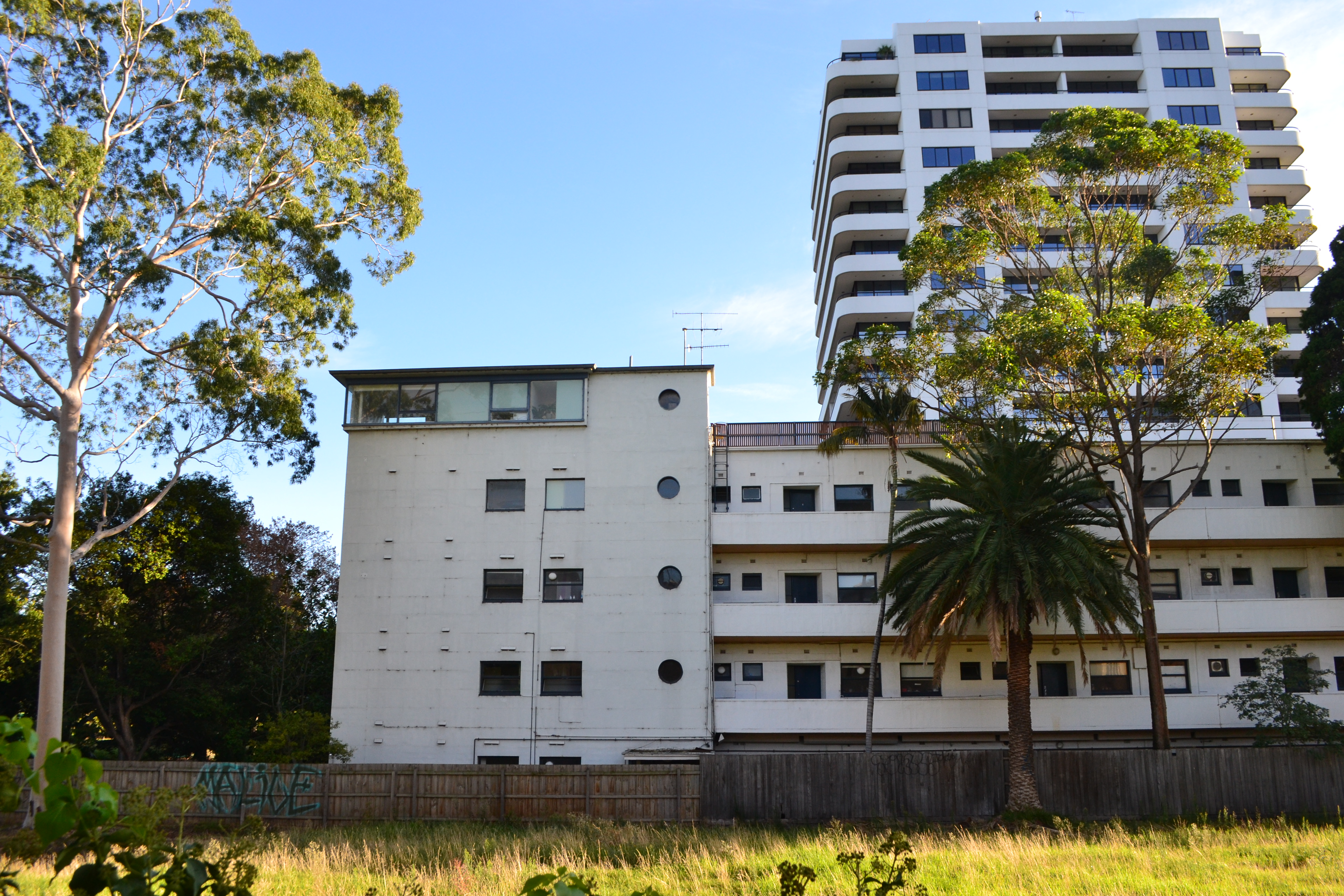
South elevation

== Architectural importance ==
Completed in early 1941, the Newburn project was well received and considered one of the first Australian adaptations of European ideals in relation to multi-unit complexes. The offset planning is reminiscent of Gropius's Berlin housing estates, and key design elements relate to the Expressionism of Erich Mendelsohn. It was considered the first Australian residential design to use off-form concrete as an exterior surface as opposed to the common practice of stucco or brickwork.
