= Picón =

Coordinates: 39°03′N 4°04′W

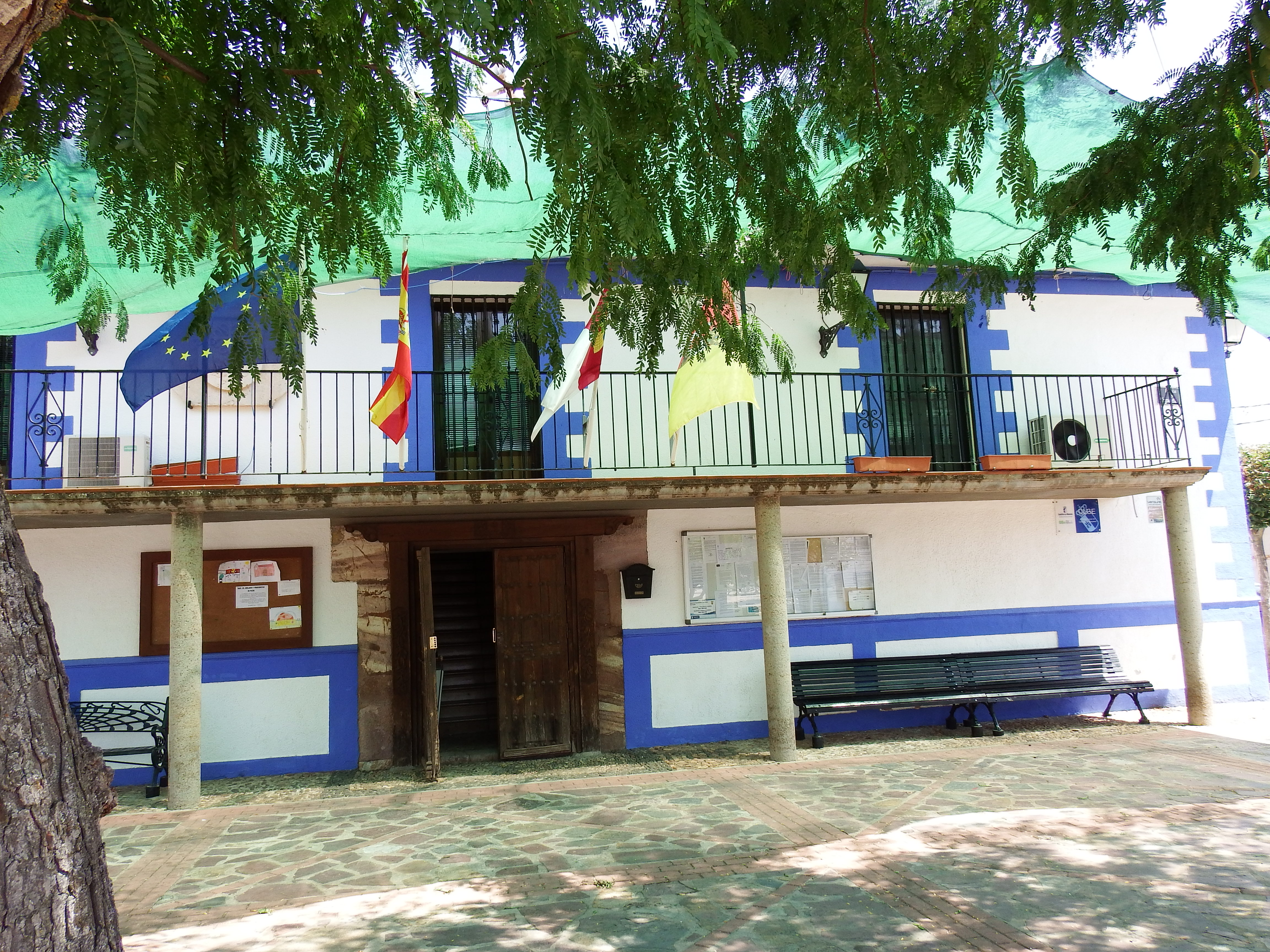
Picón - Town Hall

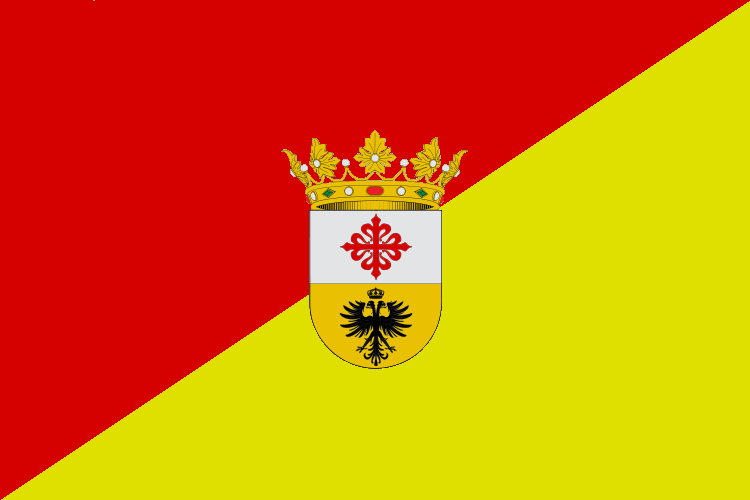
Flag of Picón

Coat of arms of Picón

Picón is a municipality in Ciudad Real, Castile-La Mancha, Spain. It has a population of 661. It was also a province in New Spain

Picón is also the name of blue cheeses made around the Asturias/Cantabria border in northern Spain, especially from the villages of Bejes and Tresviso.

And a type of traditional parang music.
