= Lucy Pickens =

American socialite

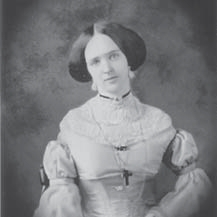
Lucy Pickens in 1857

Lucy Petway Holcombe Pickens (June 11, 1832 – August 8, 1899) was a 19th-century American socialite of Tennessee and Texas, known during and after her lifetime as the "Queen of the Confederacy". She occasionally known as the “Yellow Rose of Texas”. She was also a First Lady of South Carolina. Described as "beautiful, brilliant, and captivating" by her male contemporaries, she helped shape the stereotype of the "Southern belle." Born into a planter's family, she moved with them to Marshall, Texas, the seat of Harrison County, at age 16.

She married Colonel Francis Wilkinson Pickens of South Carolina in 1858, after he was nominated as United States ambassador to Russia. Even though she was raised Presbyterian, Lucy converted to her husband's Episcopalian faith. They returned to the United States in 1860 and he was elected as governor of the state several days before the legislature voted to secede from the Union. According to the 1860 census, he owned $45,400 in real estate (the equivalent of approximately $1,247,000 today) and $244,206 in personal property (about $6,768,000 today). He (and by extension his wife) also owned 276 slaves.

After the war and during Reconstruction, they found it challenging to keep their upland plantation of Edgewood productive without the aid of hundreds of enslaved people. After her husband died in 1869, Lucy Pickens adjusted to life as a young widow, and learned how to run the plantation. She lost her daughter to illness in 1893.

== Life ==
She was born to Beverly LaFayette Holcomb and Eugenia Dorothea (Hunt) Holcomb at their family plantation near La Grange, Tennessee. She attended La Grange Female Academy before switching to a finishing school in Bethlehem, Pennsylvania, with older sister Anna Eliza, from 1846–1848.

In 1848, the Holcombes moved to Marshall, Texas. They lived in the Capitol Hotel in the county seat while waiting for the construction of the main house and outbuildings for their cotton plantation Wyalucing. Later marked by personal tragedy when her first fiancé, Lieutenant William Crittenden, was killed during a Cuban independence expedition. Several years later, Lucy wrote a novella entitled The Free Flag of Cuba, a romanticized account of the exploits of Cuban freedom fighter Narciso López and his failed invasion of Cuba. It was published in 1854 under the name "H. M. Hardimann."

In the summer of 1857, Lucy met Colonel Francis Wilkinson Pickens of South Carolina, an older widower who proceeded to court her, but with little success. In January 1858, after his defeat for a Senate seat, he accepted an appointment as the US ambassador to Russia. Suddenly she accepted his previous proposal, and they were married at Wyalucing on April 26, 1858. He was old enough to be Lucy's father and had daughters from his two late wives.

The Pickenses took two household slaves to Russia with them, Lucinda and Tom. Lucy became a favorite at the Russian court of Alexander II. She and her husband were befriended by Alexander and his wife Maria Alexandrovna, who became godparents to the daughter Lucy bore while in Russia, Eugenia Frances Dorothea Olga Neva—the last two names being added by the Tsarina. The Tsar called Frances Douschka, "Darling" in Russian, a nickname she kept all her life.

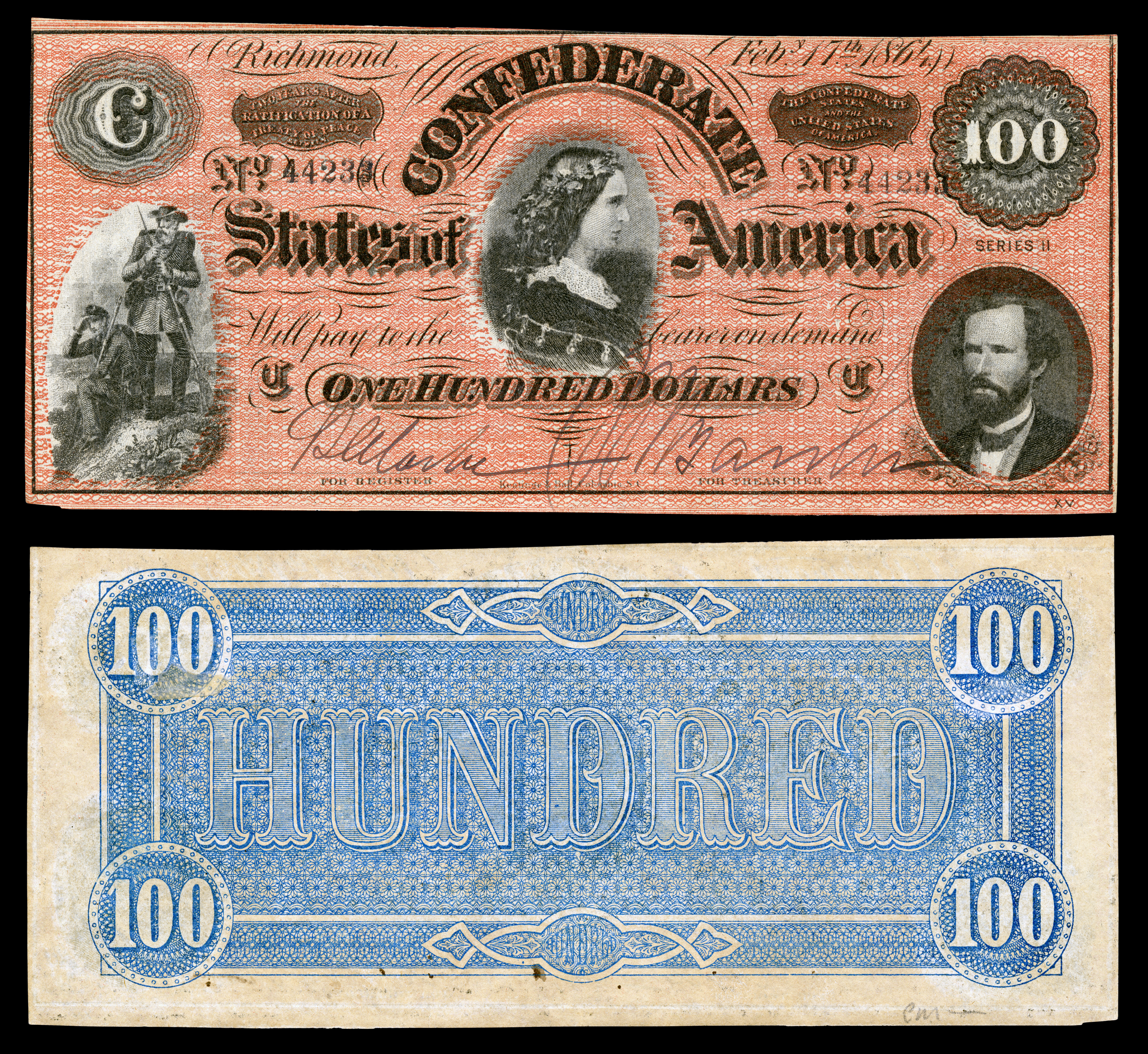
Lucy Pickens depicted on an 1864 Confederate $100 banknote (with George W. Randolph).

Lucy taught Lucinda to read and write in English, and to speak French and Russian. The young slave woman cared for Douschka and later returned with the Pickenses to South Carolina.

A longing for South Carolina and worries about its leaning toward secession caused the Pickens family to return home in August 1860. They settled at the Pickens plantation, Edgewood, located in the upcountry region of the state. Francis W. Pickens was elected governor by the General Assembly of South Carolina on December 17, three days before the legislature voted to secede from the Union.

An advocate of secession, Lucy Holcombe Pickens was the only woman to be depicted on the currency of the Confederate States of America (three issues of the $100 CSA bill and one issue of the $1 CSA bill, which were printed in Columbia, South Carolina). She was also featured on one issue of $1,000 CSA loan certificates. In April 1861, Lucy and friends witnessed the shelling of Fort Sumter from a rooftop in Charleston. In November 1861, a unit of the Confederate States Army was formed; it was called the Holcombe Legion in her honor. She designed and sewed its flag. It is claimed that she financed regiment's equipment by the sale of some of the jewels given to her by the tsar including a 12 carat sapphire.

During the war years, Pickens lived much of the time at her husband's plantation of Edgewood. There she had to get along with his daughters from earlier marriages, and manage overseers and, through them, the enslaved labor force. Her own family's plantation Wyalusing in Marshall, Texas, was used as the base of the Trans-Mississippi Agency of the Confederate Post Office during the war.

After the war, Francis W. Pickens chose to take the oath of loyalty in order to gain amnesty offered by President Andrew Johnson, who had succeeded to office following the assassination of President Abraham Lincoln. The provisional governor of South Carolina, Benjamin F. Perry, thought Pickens was unlikely to be pardoned for his part in the war as he was worth more than $20,000. Lucy, then visiting her family in Texas, sold some of her jewelry, including pieces given to her by the tsar in Russia, to raise money for them.

Many freedmen stayed to work at Edgewood as sharecroppers, but the transition to free labor was wrenching. Lucinda stayed with Lucy Pickens to continue caring for "Douschka." Francis' valet Tom left them after the end of the war and migrated to the North. Lucy accepted an offer to be Vice-Regent of South Carolina for the Mount Vernon Ladies' Association, formed to purchase and preserve founding father George Washington's plantation along the Potomac River south of Washington, DC. Beset by problems and taxes, her husband was able to retain only Edgewood (with her help), selling or losing to taxes his plantations in Mississippi and Alabama.

In 1869 Francis died. Lucy, a young widow at 37, had to learn how to manage their plantation and affairs.

She died of a cerebral embolism at her home, Edgewood, on August 8, 1899. She was buried near her husband and daughter in Edgefield Cemetery.
