= White City railway station =

Railway station in Victoria, Australia

White City
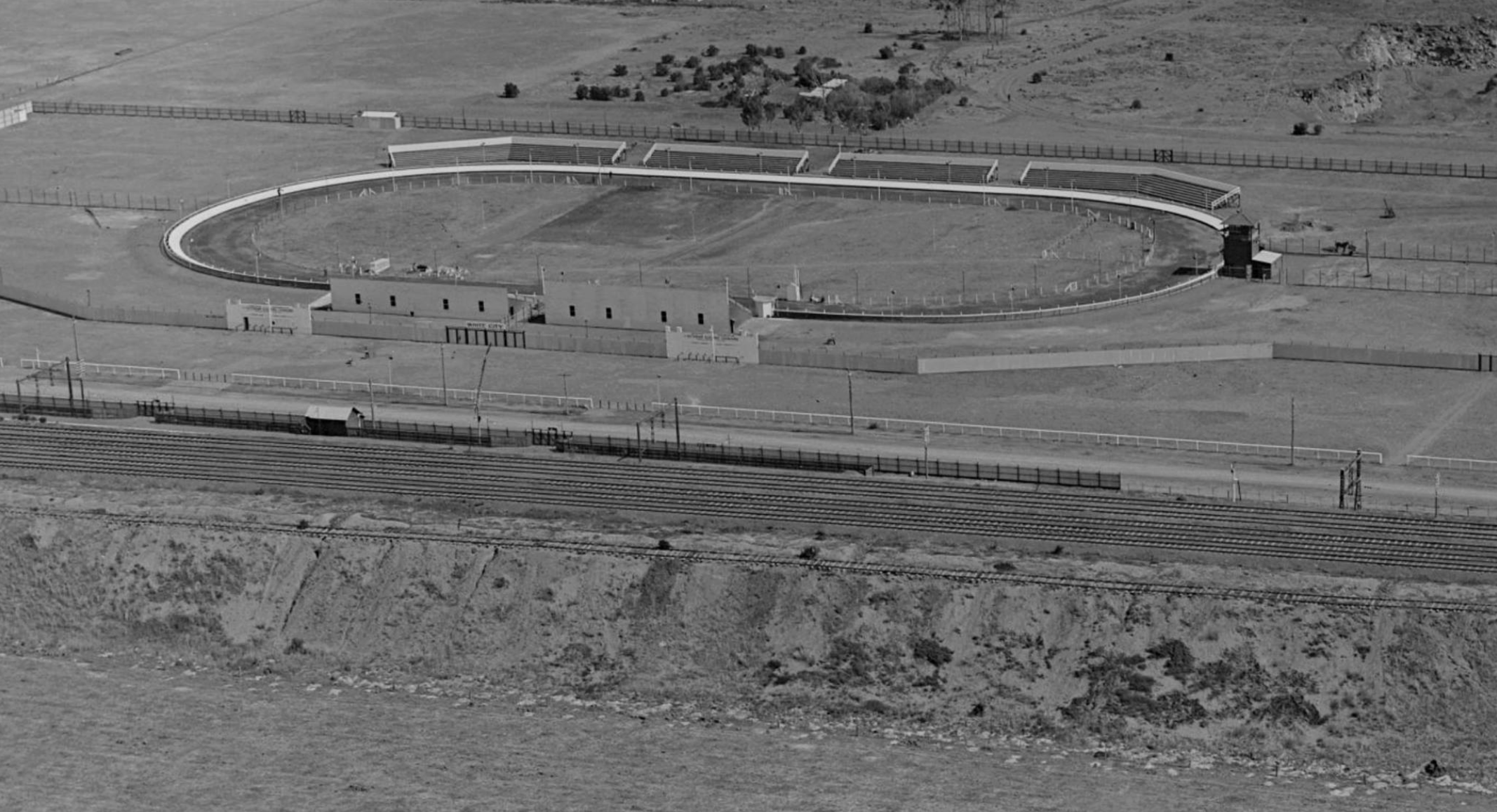
- Greyhound racing track and station circa 1930

General information
- Other names: Coursing Platform (1927–1929)
- Coordinates: 37°47′54″S 144°51′20″E
- System: Closed commuter rail station
- Line: Sunbury
- Distance: 9.8 kilometres from Southern Cross
- Platforms: 1
- Tracks: 2

Other information
- Status: Demolished
- Station code: WCY

History
- Opened: 10 December 1927; 98 years ago
- Closed: 4 October 1981; 44 years ago

Former services
Preceding station	VicRail	Following station
Tottenham towards Flinders Street	St Albans line	Sunshine towards St Albans
List of closed railway stations in Melbourne
Location

White City was a railway station on the St Albans line (now Sunbury line) on the Melbourne rail network. It was located approximately 700 metres (2,300 ft) west of Tottenham station in the suburb of Tottenham.

== History ==
The station was opened as Coursing Platform on 10 December 1927 to serve the Coursing Stadium greyhound racing track. When the track was renamed to "White City" after the site of the 1908 London Olympics, the station name was changed on 25 August 1929.

Workmen's trains began stopping at White City station on 10 June 1940 to serve employees at local industries, including the Olympic Tyres factory. However, it was not until 28 June 1948 that trains returning to the city stopped at the station, when an afternoon "up" service was provided from the station's single platform, using the crossover at the up end of the platform.

In December 1949, White City became a regular suburban station. The station only ever had one platform (on the westbound track), despite 50 services per week stopping there at its peak. Because of its proximity to Tottenham station, White City's signals were operated from there.

The greyhound racing track was closed in 1955. The Olympic Cables Company, which was located opposite to the station, unsuccessfully petitioned for it to be renamed to Olympic in 1959.

During the early 1980s, Tottenham station and its area underwent extensive alterations. The line was raised in order to eliminate the Ashley Street level crossing and a new high-level island platform was provided. Because of this, the decision was made to close White City.

On 24 March 1981, the crossover and associated signals at White City were booked out of service and scheduled for removal, with the station officially closed on 4 October 1981. The platform was removed shortly after and no trace of its existence remains.

== See also ==
- List of closed railway stations in Melbourne
