= Braybrook, Victoria =

Braybrook
- Suburb
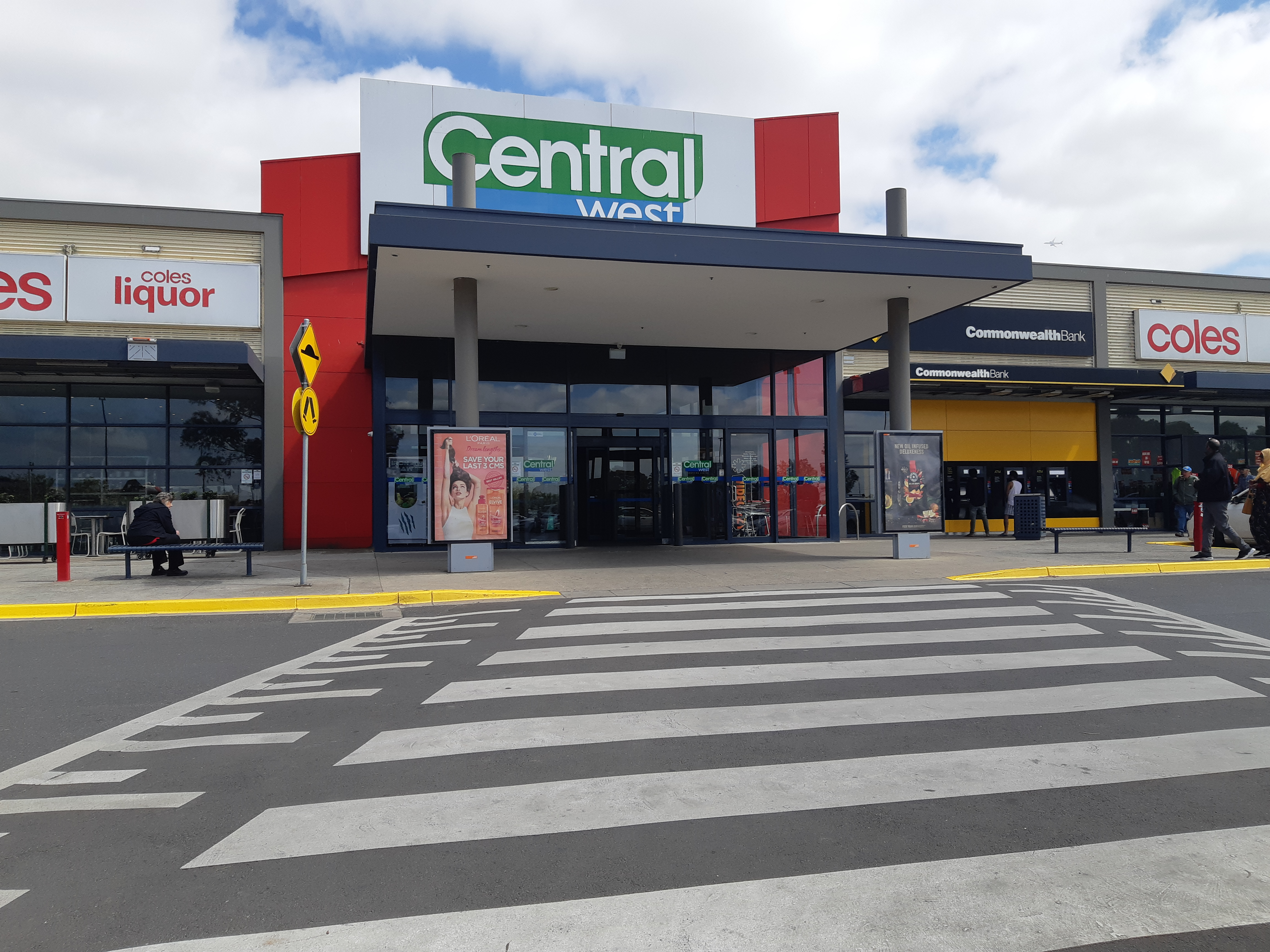
- Central West Plaza

- Interactive map of Braybrook
- Coordinates: 37°47′08″S 144°51′19″E
- Country: Australia
- State: Victoria
- City: Melbourne
- LGA: City of Maribyrnong
- Location: 10 km (6.2 mi) from Melbourne

Government
  - State electorate: Laverton
  - Federal division: Fraser

Area
  - Total: 4.3 km^{2} (1.7 sq mi)
- Elevation: 40 m (130 ft)

Population
  - Total: 9,682 (2021 census)
  - Density: 2,252/km^{2} (5,830/sq mi)
- Postcode: 3019
Suburbs around Braybrook
Sunshine North	Avondale Heights	Maribyrnong
Sunshine	Braybrook	Maidstone
Brooklyn	Tottenham	West Footscray

Braybrook is a suburb in Melbourne, Victoria, Australia, 9 km (5.6 mi) west of Melbourne's Central Business District, located within the City of Maribyrnong local government area. Braybrook recorded a population of 9,682 at the 2021 census.

Braybrook is bounded in the west by Duke Street, in the north by the Maribyrnong River, in the east by Ashley Street, and in the south by the Sunbury railway line and Sunshine Road.

== History ==
Braybrook Post Office opened on 1 December 1860.

Braybrook was primarily an industrial suburb. Today it is composed of a mix of residential and light industrial.

=== Heritage listings ===
The following places in Braybrook are listed on the Victorian Heritage Register:

- ETA Foods Factory (former), at 254 Ballarat Road

== Today ==
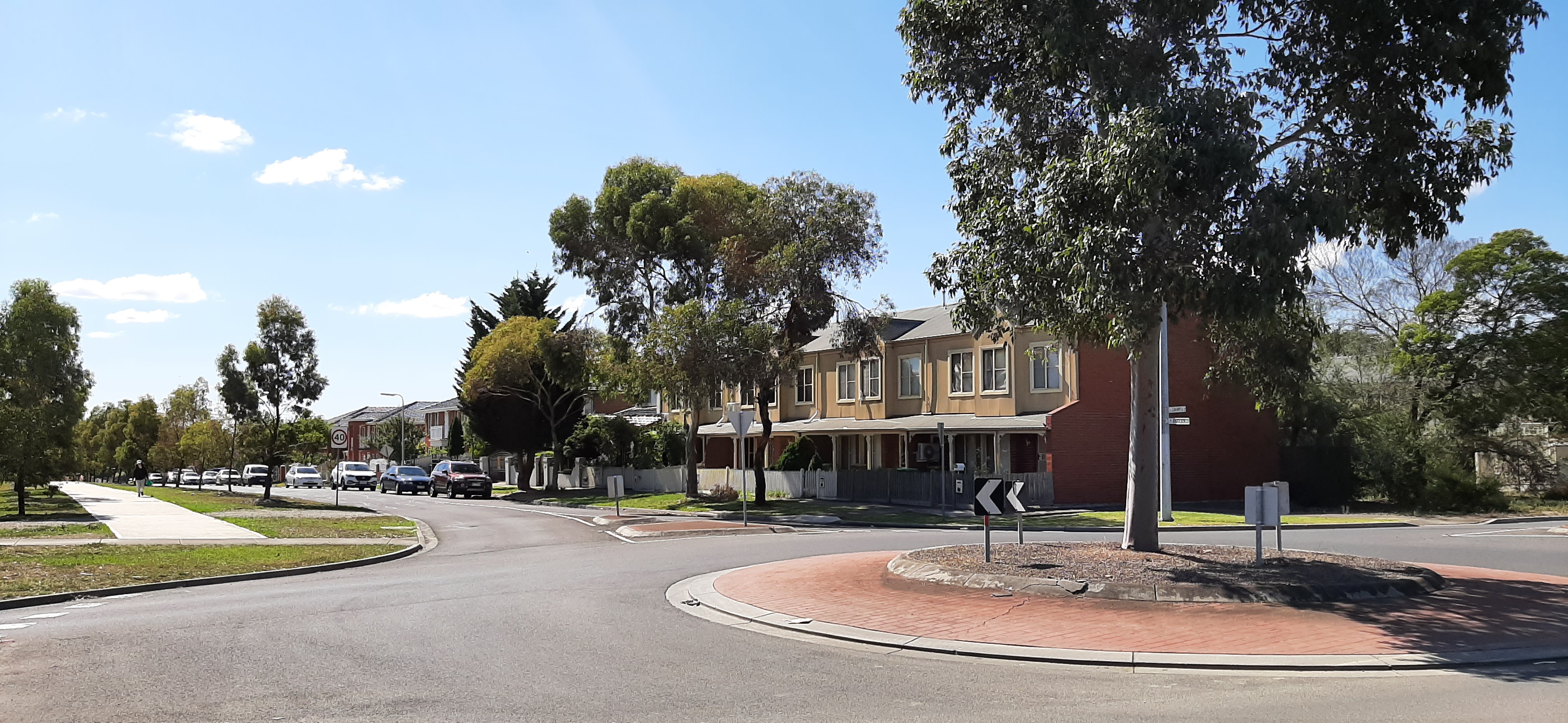
Butler Street, Braybrook

Approximately midway between the former Councils of Footscray and Sunshine in the heart of the western suburbs before the more recent urban sprawl and due west from the Melbourne CBD along Ballarat Road, Braybrook is starting to resemble a bedroom community due to a recent expansion of the western suburbs of Melbourne which are far less populated than the east. Historically this is due to stigma, but the western suburbs are expanding now due to prime location and rising fuel prices. Some gentrification has occurred in the past decade with many former factory sites developed for modern housing projects (townhouses etc.). More and more first home buyers and developers are focusing on Braybrook and neighbouring Maidstone and West Footscray, but traces of its industrial past may be still evident.

Braybrook has been ranked 95 out of top 314 most liveable suburbs in Melbourne in the "2011 Liveability Stakes" by The Age and The Melbourne Magazine.

== People ==
The suburb has produced a number of famous sporting and show business personalities. 1960s pop singer Yvonne Barrett resided with her family in Dodds Street. Barrett was murdered in 1985, with her funeral service held at Braybrook's Christ The King Catholic church in Churchill Avenue. 1970's Pop sensation Jamie Redfern also lived in the area. Ray "Screamy" Eames, the drummer from popular Melbourne pub-rock act The Blue Echoes lived in Braybrook. High-profile Australian rules footballers Doug Hawkins, Ted Whitten and Brian Wilson played for the Braybrook Football Club.

== Education ==
=== Kindergarten/ day care services ===
- ABC Goodstart Early Learning (1 Vine Street)
- Cherry Crescent Pre-school (Cherry Crescent)
- Kids Heaven Family Day Care Services (5/6 South Road)
- Little Champs Day Care (97A-101 Hargreaves Crescent)
- Shifa Family Day Care (Office D4 67 Ashley Street)

=== Schools ===
- Dinjerra Primary School, located on South Road.
- Rosamond School, located on the old Braybrook Primary School site on the corner of Ballarat Road and Errol Street.
- Braybrook College, a public secondary school, located on Ballarat Road.
- Caroline Chisholm Catholic College, located on Churchill Avenue.
- Christ the King Primary School, located on Riley Court.
- Braybrook contains the main campus of WELS (Western English Language School) which is located on South Road.
- Braybrook Primary School (former), which was 120 years old and located on Ballarat Road was closed and amalgamated with Sunshine East Primary and Sunvale Primary in 2007. The old buildings burned down in 2010. The buildings have since been demolished and the site allocated to the relocated Rosamond School.

== Transport ==
Several bus routes operate around Braybrook:

- 215 Caroline Springs ↔ Highpoint SC
- 216 Sunshine Station ↔ City via Dynon Rd
- 220 Sunshine Station ↔ City via Footscray Rd
- 408 St Albans Station ↔ Highpoint SC via Sunshine Station
- 410 Sunshine Station ↔ Footscray via Ballarat Road

The area is served by rail, with Tottenham and Sunshine the closest railway stations to Braybrook.

== Community infrastructure ==
=== Community Centre ===
The Braybrook Community Centre is located at 107–139 Churchill Avenue, Braybrook. The centre offers children's facilities, crafts, English as a second language (ESL) classes, computer and Internet facilities, playgroups, health and wellbeing classes and financial counselling. It also offers rooms and halls for hire. Cohealth is housed within the centre and offers general medical practitioners, optometry, physiotherapy, podiatry, social work, occupational therapists, speech pathology for children, pharmaceutical program and a women's and children's health nurse.

=== Other community facilities ===
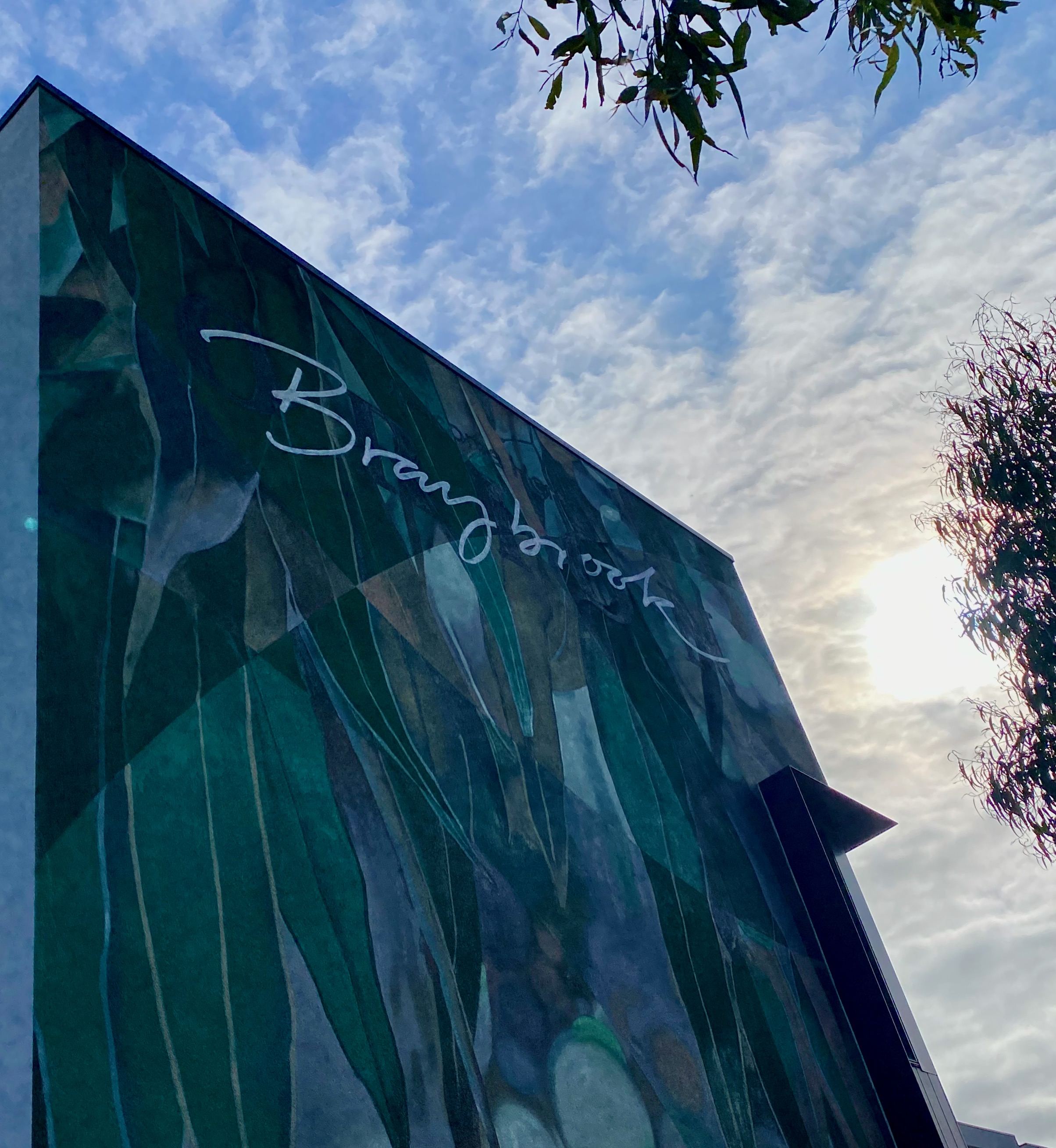
Mural on a new housing estate

The Community Hub at 19 Hargreaves Crescent is a base for the Neighbourhood Renewal Team and the Braybrook and Maidstone Neighbourhood Association to collaborate with local residents to bring about change. Local residents are welcome to visit and learn more about Neighbourhood Renewal and the Association. The Hub will be home to the Braidstone Bulletin – a local community newsletter and will have small meeting rooms available for local groups.

The Catholic parish of Christ the King, Braybrook was established in 1952, from sections of Sunshine and West Footscray parishes. In 1958, the parish transferred from its temporary centre in Rupert Street to its present location on 65–67 Churchill Avenue, with the opening of the Catholic Centre.

=== Attractions ===
- Maribyrnong River
- Maribyrnong River Trail
- 234 Fun Galore Family Entertainment Complex (Previously known as Fun City Go Karts),

== Commerce and shopping ==
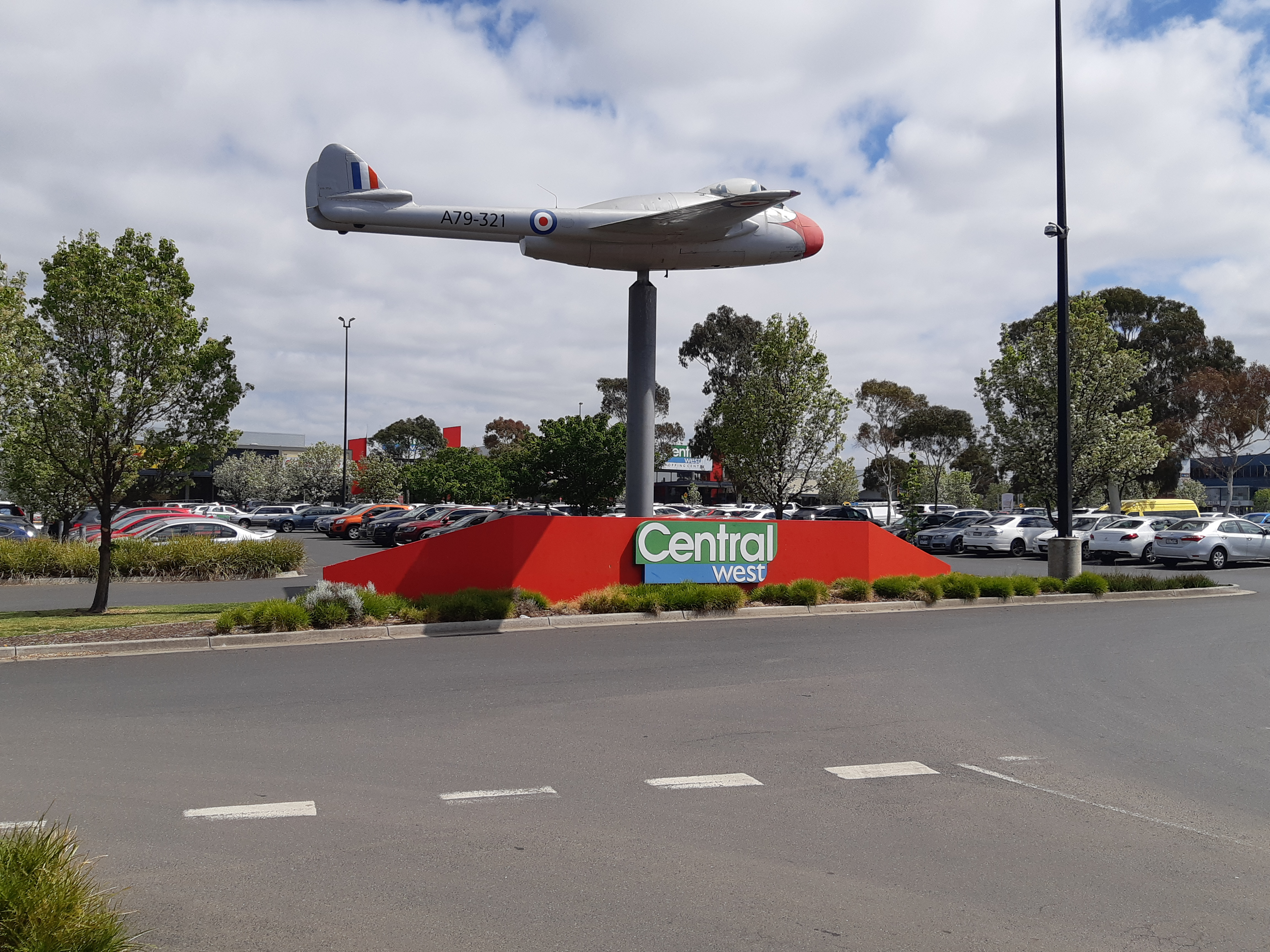
Central West Plaza

There is a local shopping centre called Central West Plaza, located on the corner of Ashley Street and South Road on the border of West Footscray. It was built on the grounds of a former RAAF base and the shopping centre has a general aviation theme, including a WW2 Vampire fighter plane on display at the Ashley Street entrance. This was moved from the office complex development adjacent in 2003.

There is another major shopping centre on the corner of Ashley Street and Ballarat Road, Braybrook Shopping Centre. It has 24 hour Derrimut Gym and Rabbit Hole Kids playcentre. KFL supermarket recently took over Woolworths whom left in 2021.

Most retail businesses in the area are still located in strip malls and small individual shops on Ballarat Road. The strip malls are on South Road, Churchill Avenue and Ballarat Road. A large number of fast food restaurants are on the Braybrook section of Ballarat Road.

Braybrook is near Barkly Village, a section of Barkly Street in West Footscray that hosts many local and ethnic grocers, stores and a Sims Supermarket.

Australia's first Masters Home Improvement store was located on Ballarat Road, however it closed in 2016 when the chain went out of business. The site, since its opening in 2019, is a Home Consortium shopping centre, featuring a TK Maxx fashion outlet and a Coles supermarket.

== Sport ==
Braybrook Sporting Club has Australian Rules football teams competing in the Western Region Football League. The Braybrook Club has produced a number of high-profile Australian rules football stars, including 1982 Brownlow Medalist Brian Wilson (Footscray, North Melbourne, Melbourne and St Kilda football clubs), Ted Whitten (Footscray Football Club) and Doug Hawkins (Footscray and Fitzroy Football Club Football Clubs)

There are also:

- Melbourne Knights FC Junior Football Club (Dobson Reserve)
- Rosamond Bowling Club
- Leros United Soccer Club (Scovell Reserve)
- Rosamond Tennis Club (Footscray North Primary School)
- Maidstone Junior Sporting Club (also at Footscray North Primary School)
- Footscray United Cricket Club (Scovell Reserve)

== See also ==
- City of Sunshine – Braybrook was previously within this former local government area.
