= State Savings Bank, Yarraville =

Former bank building in Melbourne, Victoria, Australia

- State Savings Bank building, 2026

- Location within Melbourne

General information
- Status: Completed
- Type: Bank branch; Residence
- Architectural style: Romanesque Revival; Art Nouveau
- Location: 13 Ballarat Street, Yarraville, Melbourne, Victoria, Australia
- Coordinates: 37°48′59″S 144°53′28″E
- Completed: December 1909
- Opened: 7 March 1910; 116 years ago
- Cost: A£1,966
- Client: State Savings Bank of Victoria

Technical details
- Material: Red brick; timber; plaster; glass; tiles; wrought iron
- Floor count: 2

Design and construction
- Architecture firm: Sydney Smith and Ogg
- Other designers: Robert Haddon

Victorian Heritage Register
- Official name: State Savings Bank (former)
- Type: Registered place
- Designated: 22 February 1989
- Reference no.: H0723
- Heritage overlay on.: HO24
- Categories: Finance; Commercial

The State Savings Bank building is a former branch office of the State Savings Bank of Victoria, and now a commercial building and private residence, located at 13 Ballarat Street in Yarraville, an inner-western suburb of Melbourne, in Victoria, Australia. Built in 1909 as a bank branch, the building has variously been used as a residence and retail use.

The property was added to the Victorian Heritage Register on 22 February 1989; and was also added to non-statutory lists by the Victorian branch of the National Trust and the City of Maribyrnong on unknown dates.

== Description ==
The State Savings Bank of Victoria branch in Yarraville was designed by Sydney Smith and Ogg in the Romanesque Revival Art Nouveau style. (Note: The City of Maribyrnong heritage report states that the structure was completed in the "…Edwardian Freestyle architectural style which used British and Italian Medieval sources for its inspiration.") The building was completed in 1909 at a cost of A£1,966. Smith and Ogg employed Robert Haddon as a contract designer, and his book on Australian architecture illustrates similar bank and office designs.

The building is a key element of the established commercial district of Yarraville. The building is a notable and intact example of the banks designed by Sydney Smith and Ogg and an important commercial building in the western region of Melbourne.

Opened on 7 March 1910, the structure consisted of a two-storey red brick building. The ground floor banking chamber was entered from Ballarat Street, whilst the four-bedroom residence for the bank manager, located above, was entered via Canterbury Street. The Ballarat Street façade has an arched entrance and wider arched window opening surmounted by florid Art Nouveau style rendered ornament. Decorative wrought iron railings are mounted on the plinth in front of the ground floor window. The first floor features an oriel window with leadlight glazing and a smaller circular ‘port hole’ window with a rendered keystone. The residential entrance is surmounted by an elaborate terracotta spandrel panel and an arched leadlight window to the first floor stair landing.

Whilst the former banking chamber has been renovated extensively, the building's exterior has remained relatively intact since 1909, with the exception of some port-World War II additions to the south side of the original structure. The building was renovated in 2015 and in 2024, the owner made an application for further renovations for the former banking chamber to be used as a café/bar.

== See also ==
- Architecture of Melbourne
- List of places on the Victorian Heritage Register in the City of Maribyrnong
