= Kingsville, Victoria =

Kingsville
- Suburb
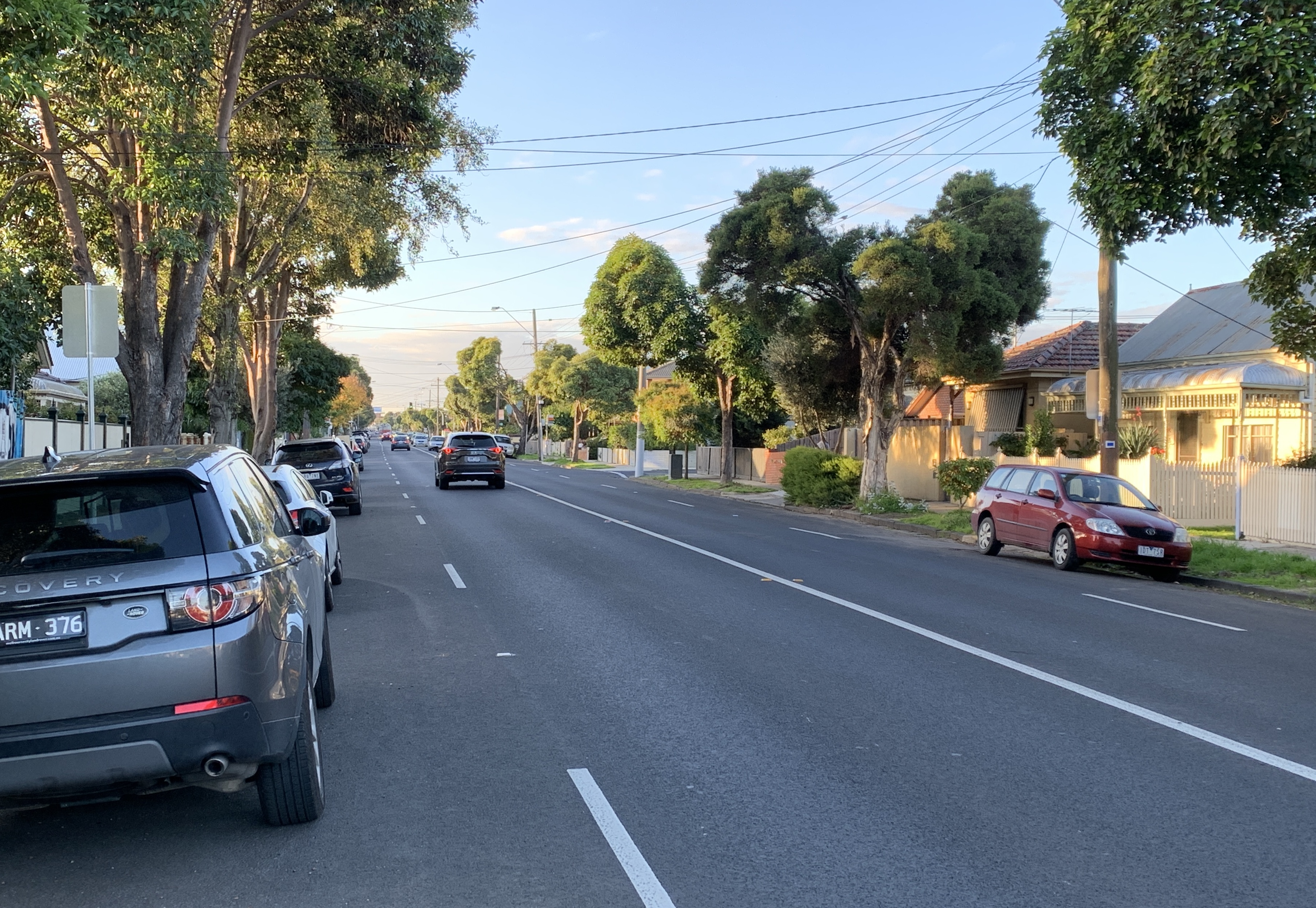
- Williamstown Road, Kingsville c. 2020

- Interactive map of Kingsville
- Coordinates: 37.809°S 144.878°E
- Country: Australia
- State: Victoria
- City: Melbourne
- LGA: City of Maribyrnong
- Location: 9 km (5.6 mi) from Melbourne

Government
  - State electorate: Footscray
  - Federal division: Fraser

Area
  - Total: 0.7 km^{2} (0.27 sq mi)
- Elevation: 24 m (79 ft)

Population
  - Total: 3,920 (2021 census)
  - Density: 5,600/km^{2} (14,500/sq mi)
- Postcode: 3012
Suburbs around Kingsville
West Footscray	West Footscray	Seddon
West Footscray	Kingsville	Seddon
Yarraville	Yarraville	Yarraville

Kingsville is an inner suburb in Melbourne, Victoria, Australia, 7 km (4.3 mi) west of Melbourne's Central Business District, located within the City of Maribyrnong local government area. Kingsville recorded a population of 3,920 at the 2021 census.

Kingsville is a small suburb nestled primarily between West Footscray and Yarraville, and is often considered to be a part of one or the other. The suburb forms a right-angled triangle, bounded in the east by Williamstown Road, in the south by Somerville Road, with Geelong Road as the hypotenuse.

== History ==
Kingsville was the original name for the entire West Yarraville region. This region was later renamed either Yarraville (south of Somerville Road) or West Footscray (north of Somerville Road), with South Kingsville retaining its original name.

In 1853, pastoralist Thomas Chirnside purchased 89 acres in the Parish of Cut Paw Paw, County of Bourke, which is now the suburb of Kingsville.

Kingsville Post Office opened on 1 January 1915.

== Education ==
- Corpus Christi Catholic Primary School
- Kingsville Primary School and the adjacent Merriwa Kindergarten are located in Yarraville.
- Kingsville Kindergarten (West Footscray)
- The Hive Early Learning Centre Kingsville

== Transport ==
Kingsville is served by several bus routes that run along its border roads:

- 431 Yarraville Station ↔ Kingsville via Somerville Rd
- 223 Yarraville ↔ Highpoint SC
- 472 Williamstown ↔ Moonee Ponds via Footscray
- 411 Laverton Station ↔ Footscray
- 412 Laverton Station ↔ Footscray

Kingsville is situated not far from railway stations on both the Sunbury and Werribee/Williamstown lines.

== See also ==
- City of Footscray – Kingsville was previously within this former local government area.
