= West Footscray =

- Suburb
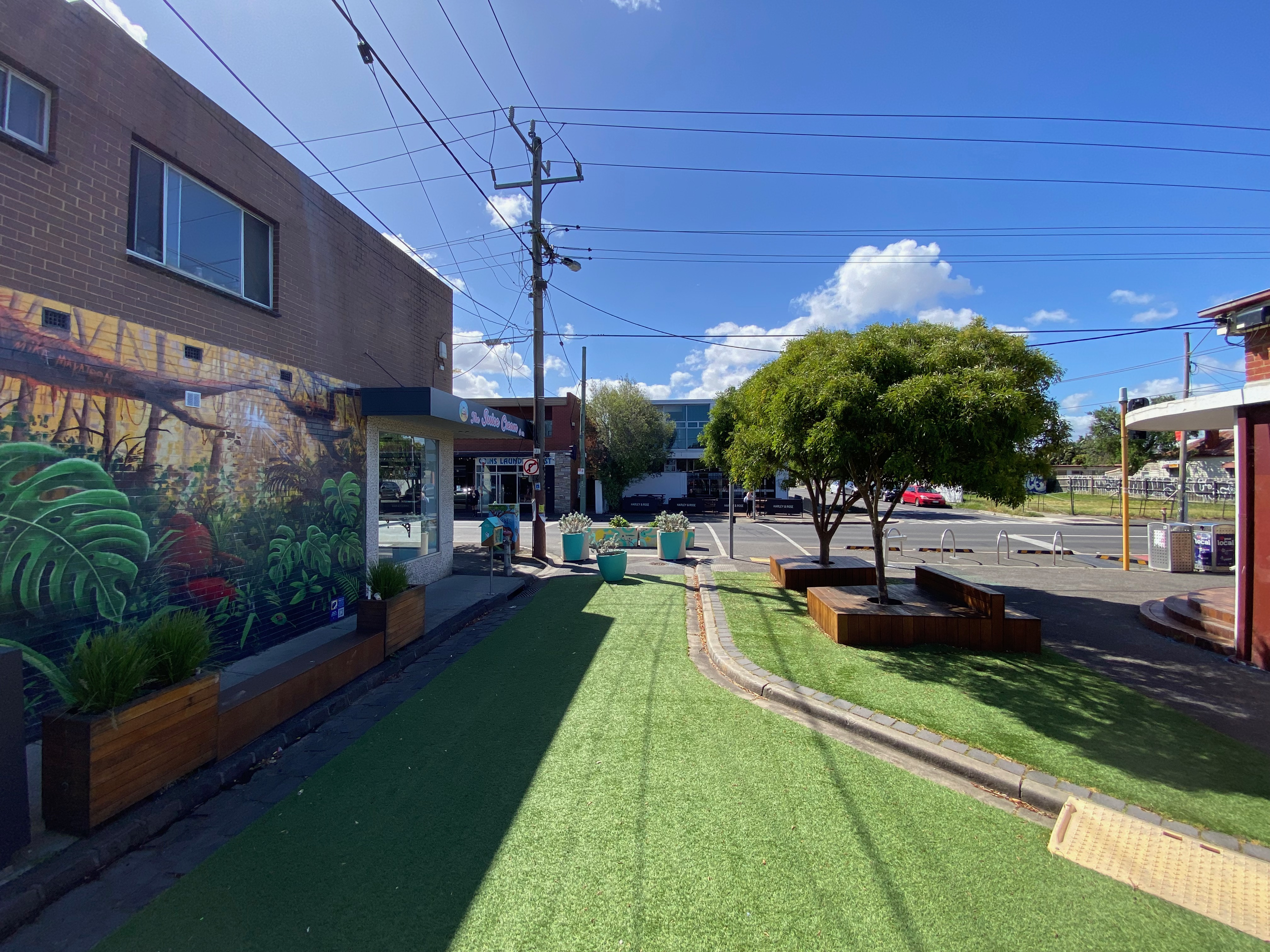
- Clarke Street pop-up park

- Interactive map of West Footscray
- Coordinates: 37.809°S 144.874°E
- Country: Australia
- State: Victoria
- City: Melbourne
- LGA: City of Maribyrnong
- Location: 7 km (4.3 mi) from Melbourne

Government
  - State electorate: Footscray
  - Federal division: Fraser

Area
  - Total: 3.8 km^{2} (1.5 sq mi)
- Elevation: 35 m (115 ft)

Population
  - Total: 11,729 (2021 census)
  - Density: 3,090/km^{2} (7,990/sq mi)
- Postcode: 3012
Suburbs around West Footscray
Braybrook	Maidstone	Footscray
Braybrook	West Footscray	Footscray
Tottenham	Kingsville	Seddon

West Footscray is an inner suburb in Melbourne, Victoria, Australia, 7 km (4.3 mi) west of Melbourne's Central Business District, located within the City of Maribyrnong local government area. West Footscray recorded a population of 11,729 at the 2021 census.

== History ==
Prior to European colonisation, the area of West Footscray was originally home to the Wurundjeri Woi Wurrung and Boonwurrung peoples of the Kulin Nation.

Footscray proper was well-established as a settlement by the mid-19th century, centered around a punt across the Maribyrnong River. Originally referred to as "Upper Footscray," allotments of land in what is now West Footscray began sale in the 1850s. Alexander Dove, a Scottish sea captain who would become the first chair of the Footscray municipal council, purchased a large allotment with an existing 13-room homestead and lived here until the 1890s, despite the surrounding allotment being subdivided in the 1880s, with the surrounding streets (Soudan Street, Khartoum Street and Dongola Road) named for the Australian participation in the British intervention in Sudan. Dove Street, slightly to the south, is named after him.

Despite continued land speculation throughout the 19th century, West Footscray (and neighbouring Maidstone) was slow to develop, owing in part to transportation difficulties; a road connection to Melbourne through the West Melbourne Swamp was not built until 1863, and while the railway line was built in 1859, trains did not stop in the area until the opening of Tottenham railway station in 1891. In 1860, a traveller passing through by train observed "some half-dozen wooden houses standing in gardens surrounded by stone walls and hedges." In 1865, of the 163 residents and businesses in the broader Footscray municipality, just 12 listed addresses in Upper Footscray.

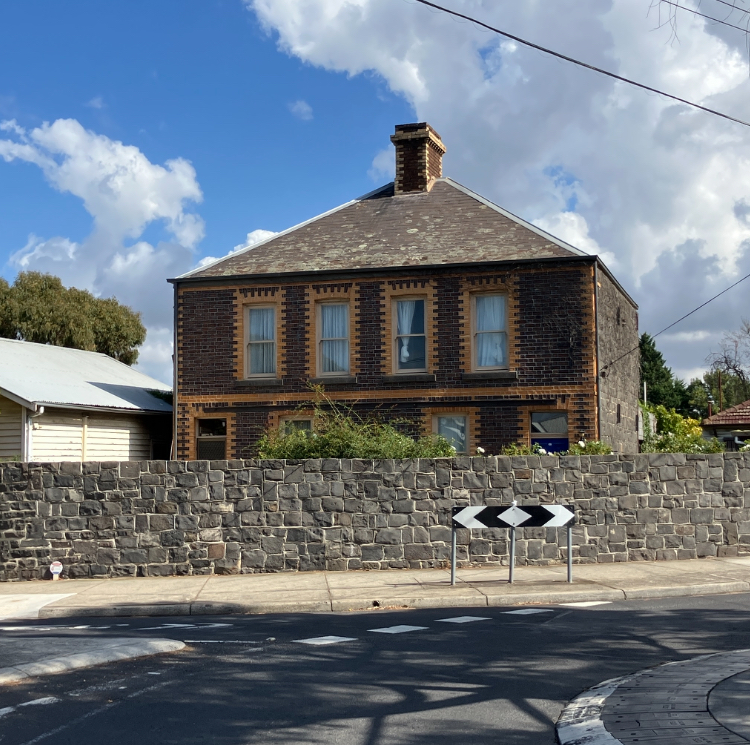
James Govan’s 19th-century home on Summerhill Road

As with many other suburbs of the City of Maribyrnong and City of Hobsons Bay, West Footscray was rich in basalt, and quarries formed an important part of its 19th century industry, with the Melbourne Punch nicknaming the area "Stoneopolis." James Govan, whose heritage-listed Georgian revival house still stands at the corner of Essex Street and Summerhill Street, was a major quarry operator who supplied bluestone for Melbourne landmarks such as the Melbourne Town Hall and Goldsborough Mort Wool Store. Govan drowned in 1886 after falling in a flooded quarry hole on departure from the Albert Hotel.

West Footscray Post Office opened in 1914. The area's first school, known as Tottenham State School but now called Footscray West Primary School, was established on Argyle Street in 1915.

In 1934, Olympic medallist Frank Beaurepaire established the first factory of the Olympic Tyre Company on Cross Street alongside the railway line. Tyre manufacturing continued here until 2001; the building has now been converted to residential apartments.

In 2018, a warehouse fire in the southern part of the suburb caused by illegally stored chemicals burned for 16 days.

In recent years West Footscray, like other suburbs in Melbourne's inner-west, has experienced increasing gentrification.

== Geography ==
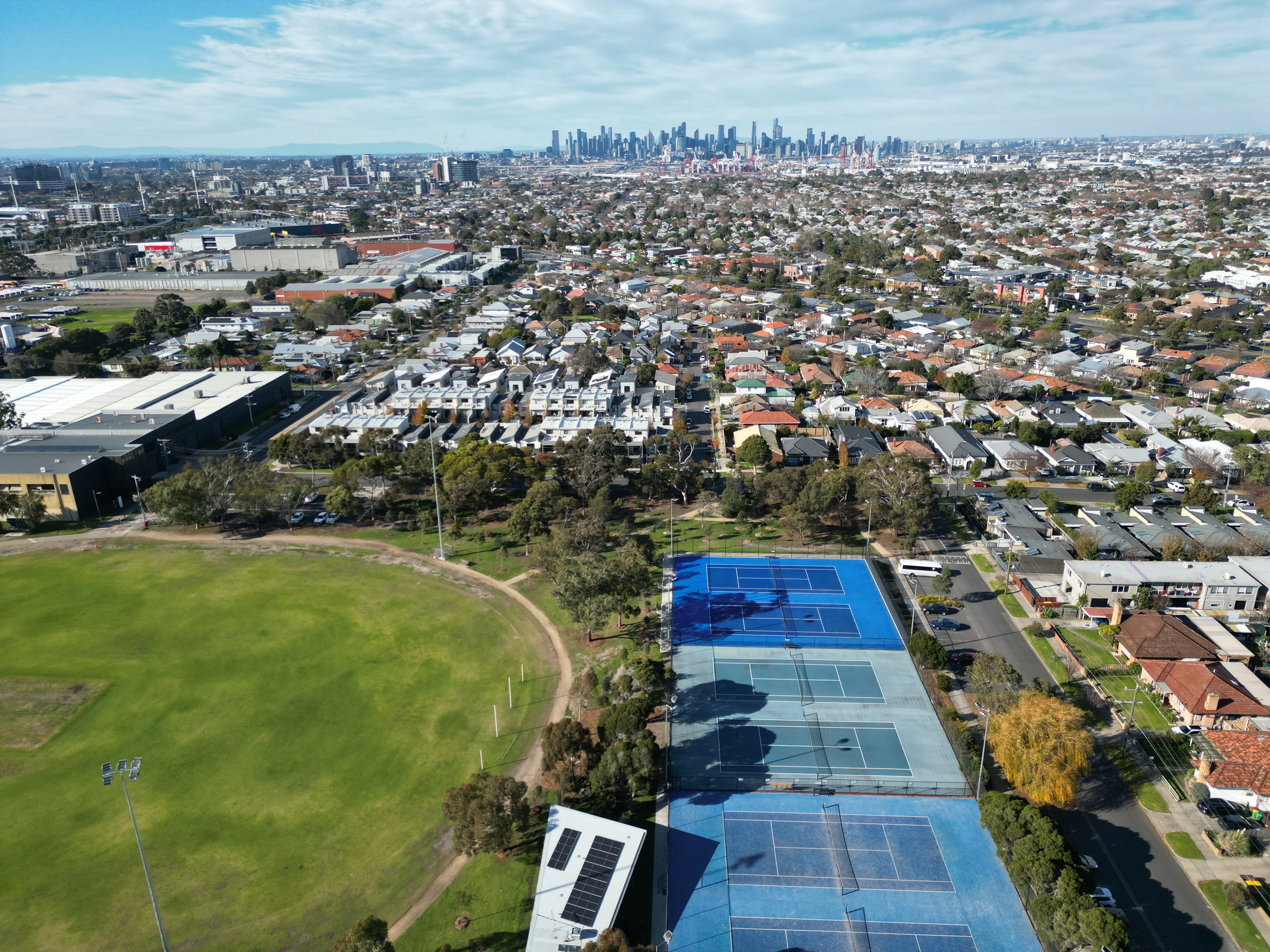
Hansen Reserve, facing east towards the city skyline

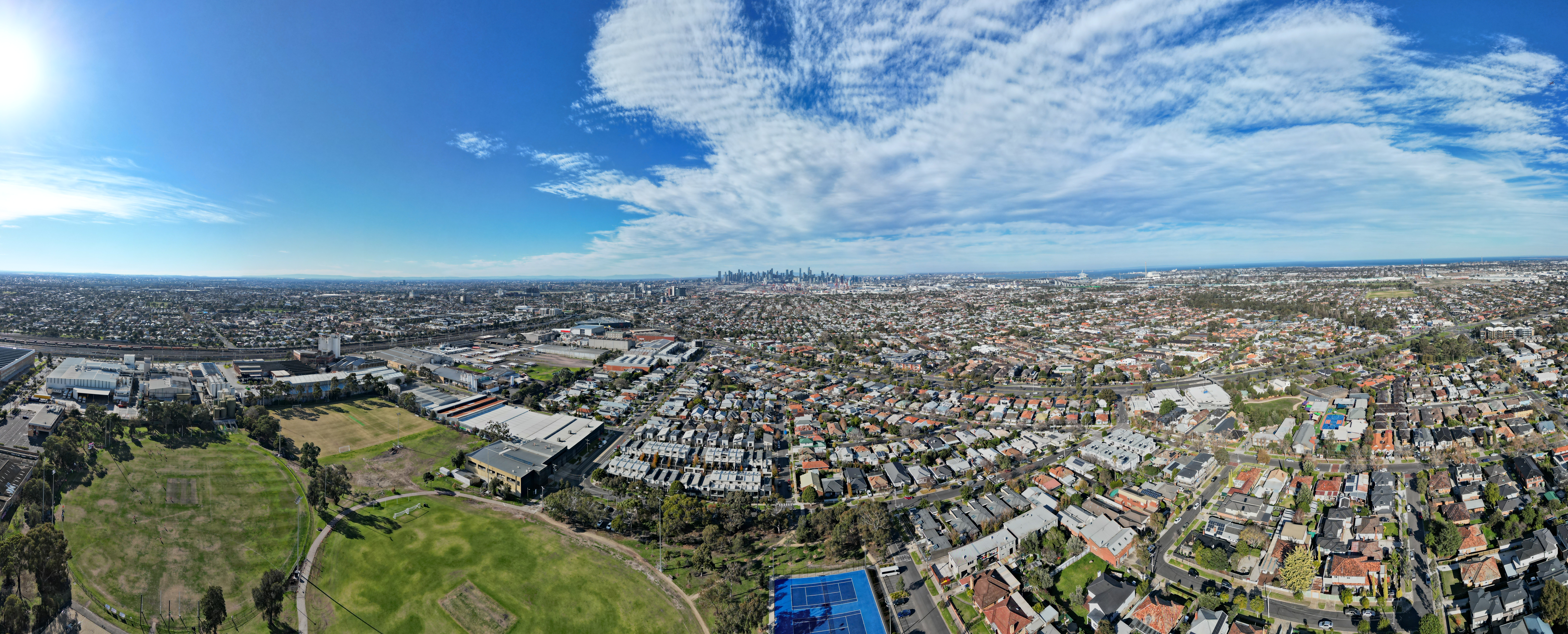
West Footscray aerial panorama. June 2025.

West Footscray is effectively divided into two halves by the railway line and Sunshine Road. The northern half, between Braybrook and Footscray proper, is largely residential, while the southern half, between Tottenham and Kingsville, is a mixture of residential, commercial and industrial zoning.

Like all of Melbourne's western suburbs, West Footscray sits at the eastern edge of the Victorian Volcanic Plain grasslands, with the soil being rich in basalt and basaltic clay.

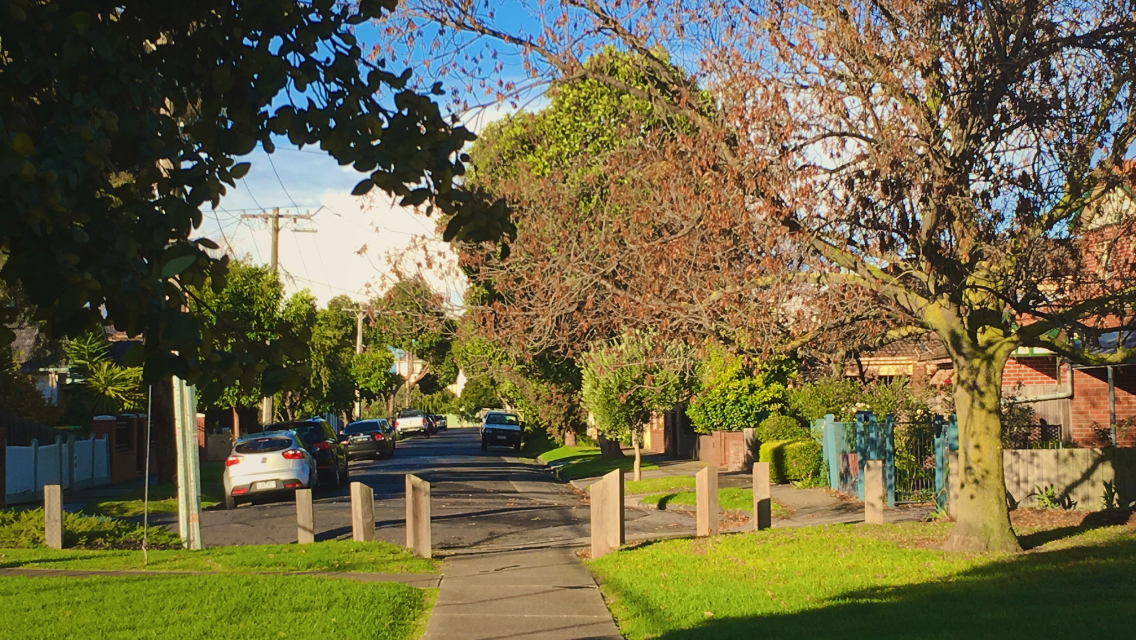
Marcus Ave, West Footscray

== Demographics ==
In the 2021 census, 61.2% of people living in West Footscray were born in Australia. The next most common countries of birth were Vietnam (6.1%), India (3.7%), England (2.2%), New Zealand (1.9%) and the Philippines (1.7%).

The most common ancestries in West Footscray were English (25.9%), Australian (24.6%), Irish (11%), Scottish (8.3%) and Vietnamese (8.1%). As in neighbouring Footscray, this is a significant increase in Anglo-Celtic ancestry on the previous 2016 census, reflecting the gentrification of Melbourne's inner western suburbs.

62.2% of people in West Footscray only spoke English at home. The next most common languages spoken at home were Vietnamese (8.2%), Italian (1.8%), Cantonese (1.6%), Mandarin (1.5%) and Telugu (1.4%).

The most common responses for religion in West Footscray were Christian (46.7%), Catholic (18.3%), not stated (7.1%), Buddhism (5.8%) and Islam (3.8%).

The median age of a West Footscray resident was 35, three years younger than the Victorian median age of 38. 40.9% of residents had a university degree, higher than the total Victorian figure of 29.2%. The median household income was $1,989 per week, higher than the Victorian median of $1,759.

== Culture ==
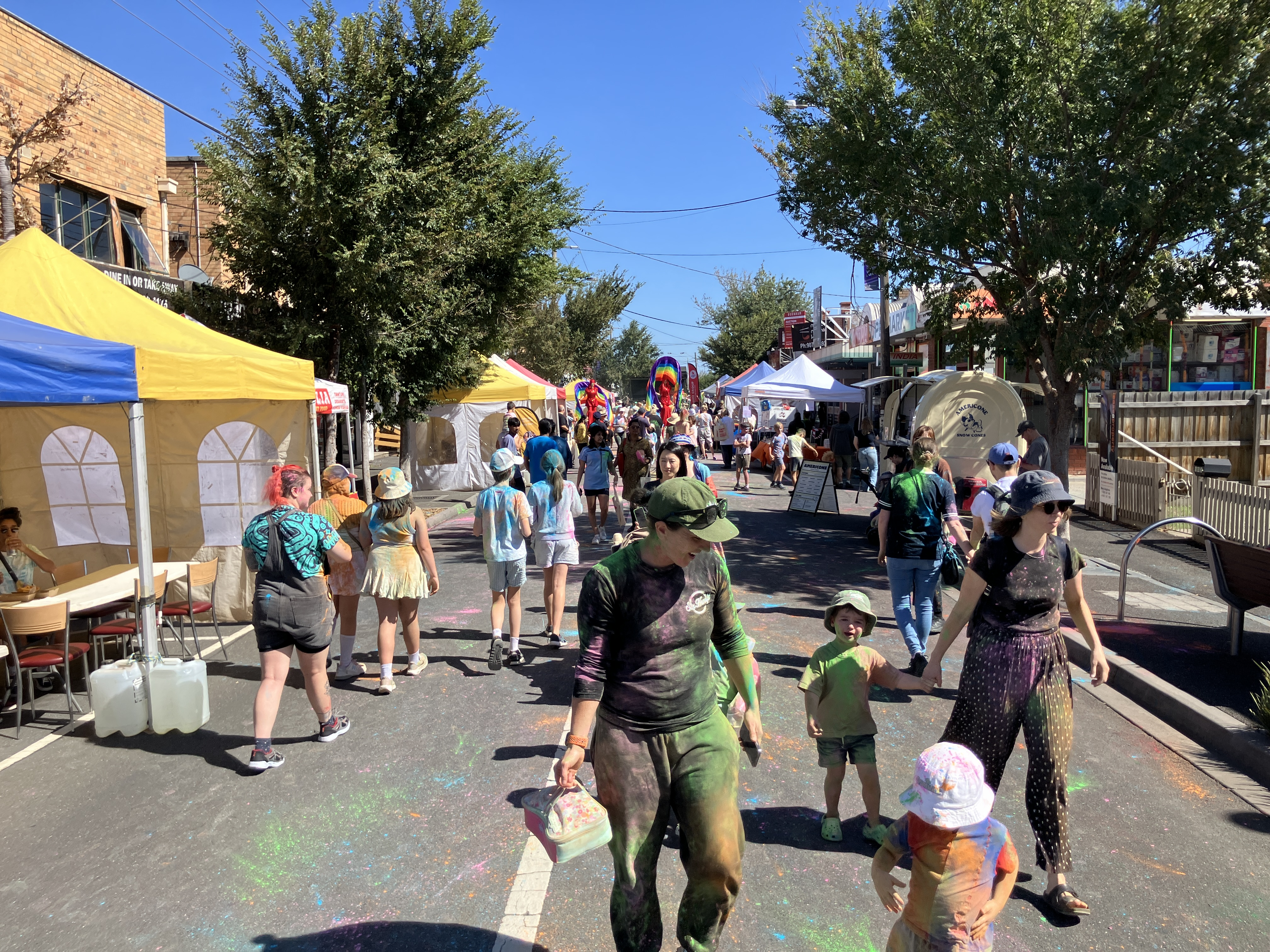
Holi Festival in Barkly Village

Barkly Village is a section of Barkly Street in West Footscray that hosts many local and ethnic grocers, stores and shops. The area has a long history of multiculturalism and includes many stores owned and operated by Indian, Vietnamese, Chinese, Anglo, Thai and Italian Australians. There is a particularly large Indian grocery store, "Bharat Traders", located here as well as independent supermarket Sims, at the end of the Barkly Village section of the street. Also along this strip is the Melbourne Chinese Bible Church.

Construction of the new West Footscray Community Centre has been completed. It incorporates a local library, replacing the former West Footscray Library on the same site. The site is a part of the Barkly Village strip.

The inaugural Footscray West Writers Fest was held in 2025.

The Footscray YMCA is located on Barret Reserve, Essex Street. 10th Footscray Scout, open to all youth aged 6–26, share the reserve with the YMCA meeting in a their hall on Graham St.

The 2nd Footscray Scout Group is located at Gaudion Reserve, Barkly Street. The group has a website and is open to youth aged 7 to 26 years. It is part of Kariwara District.

Phat Quang Temple, a Vietnamese Buddhist temple, is located in the suburb.

== Sport ==
The suburb has two Australian Rules football clubs competing in the Western Region Football League: West Footscray Football Club (The 'Roosters') and North Footscray Football Club (The 'Red Devils').

Shorten Reserve on Essex Street is home of the Druids Cricket Club and the West Footscray Roosters.

Johnson Reserve on Essex Street is home to a local women's soccer team, Maribyrnong Swifts, with several games usually hosted on Sundays.

The Footscray United Soccer Club plays at Hansen Reserve.

== Education ==
There are three kindergartens:

- Kingsville Kindergarten (Located in the southern part of the suburb, but in an area many residents consider to be part of Kingsville or Yarraville).
- Scots' Kindergarten.
- West Footscray Neighbourhood House.

There are two primary schools in the West Footscray area:

- Footscray West Primary School.
- St John's Primary School, a Catholic school which is technically situated in Footscray, but in an area many residents consider to be a part of West Footscray, also a Catholic school.

There is another Catholic School, Corpus Christi Catholic School located in the southern "Kingsville" part of the suburb.

The Western Scout centre is a training centre for the adult volunteers of Scouts Australia and one of six such sites in Melbourne. Their office in the new complex at 77 Ashley Street includes equipment donated by the Footscray Rotary Club.

== Transport ==
The following bus routes pass through West Footscray:

- 216 Sunshine Station ↔ City via Dynon Rd. Operated by Kinetic Melbourne.
- 220 Sunshine Station ↔ City via Footscray Rd. Operated by Kinetic Melbourne.
- 411 Footscray ↔ Laverton Station via Altona Meadows & Altona & Millers Rd. Operated by CDC Melbourne.
- 412 Footscray ↔ Laverton Station via Altona Meadows & Altona & Mills St. Operated by CDC Melbourne.
- 414 Footscray ↔ Laverton Station via Geelong Road. Operated by CDC Melbourne.

West Footscray has two suburban railway stations on the Sunbury line:

- West Footscray station
- Tottenham station

West Footscray station was completely rebuilt and moved 200 metres west of the original location as part of the Regional Rail Link, with the new station opening on 14 October 2013. As part of Metro Tunnel works, a third platform was built on the Cross Street side of the station to allow services to terminate. Work commenced in 2018 and was completed in 2020.

== See also ==
- City of Footscray – West Footscray was previously within this former local government area.
- 2018 West Footscray warehouse fire
