= Tottenham, Victoria =

Tottenham
- Suburb
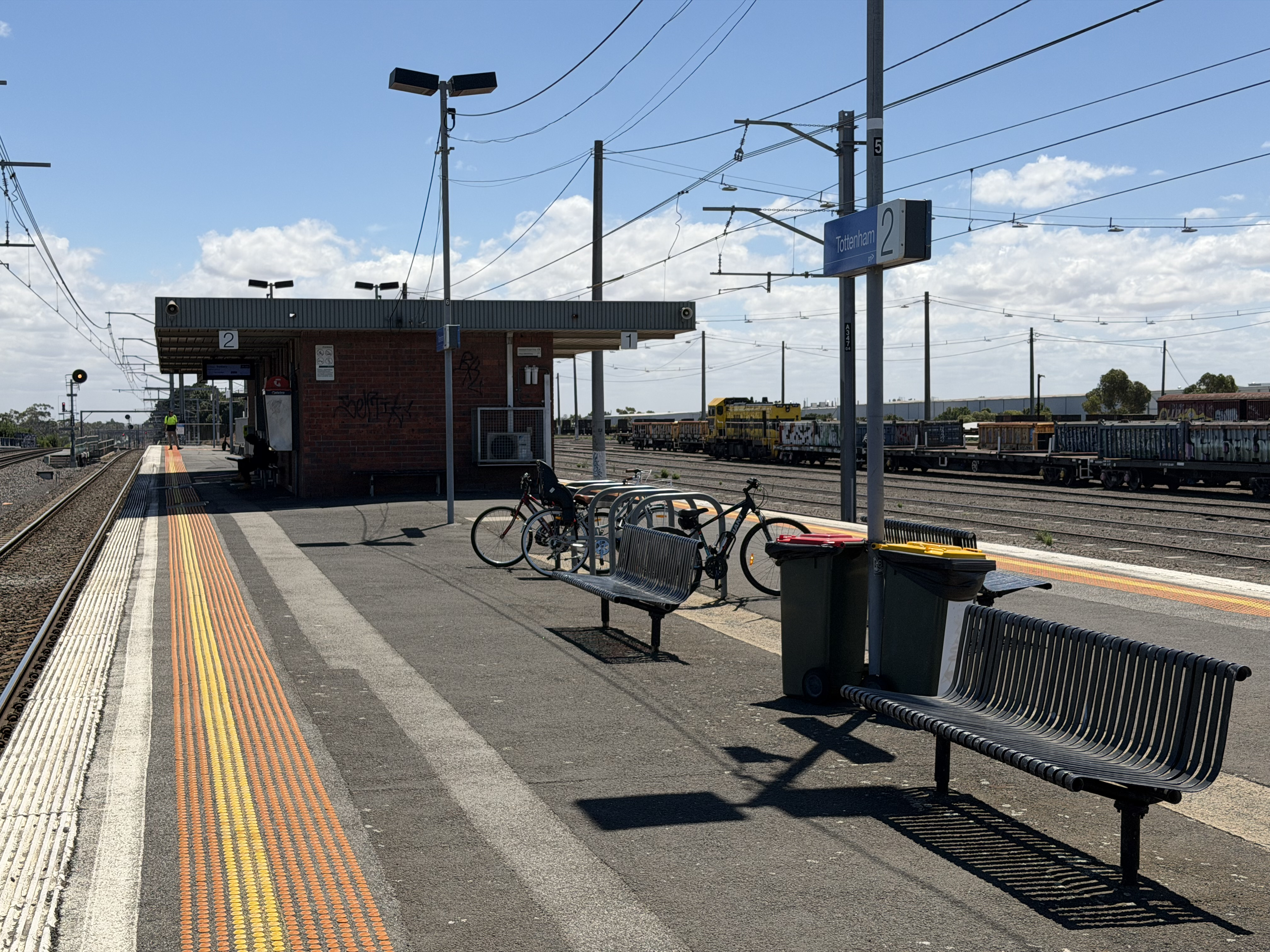
- Tottenham railway station in 2026

- Coordinates: 37.806°S 144.857°E
- Country: Australia
- State: Victoria
- City: Melbourne
- LGA: City of Maribyrnong
- Location: 9 km (5.6 mi) from Melbourne

Government
  - State electorate: Laverton
  - Federal division: Fraser

Area
  - Total: 2.1 km^{2} (0.81 sq mi)
- Elevation: 31 m (102 ft)

Population
  - Total: 0 (2021 census)
  - Density: 0.00/km^{2} (0.0/sq mi)
- Postcode: 3012
Suburbs around Tottenham
| Sunshine | Braybrook | West Footscray |
| Brooklyn | Tottenham | West Footscray |
| | Brooklyn | Yarraville |

Tottenham is a suburb in Melbourne, Victoria, Australia, 9 km (5.6 mi) west of Melbourne's Central Business District, located within the City of Maribyrnong local government area. Tottenham recorded no population at the 2021 census.

It is bounded by Sunshine Road to the north, Sredna Street, Paramount Road and Tottenham Parade to the east, Geelong Road to the south and the Newport–Sunshine railway line.

Tottenham is an almost entirely industrial suburb, with the Olex Cable manufacturing facility being one of the many industrial businesses located in Tottenham.

== History ==
Tottenham Central Post Office opened on 1 May 1947. Tottenham East Post Office opened on 18 November 1935 and closed in 1973. A Tottenham R.A.A.F. Post Office was open from 1947 until 1957.

== Transportation ==
Tottenham is serviced by the Tottenham railway station, which lies on the convergent point of the borders of West Footscray, Tottenham and Braybrook. It is a station on the Sunbury railway line.

== See also ==
- City of Sunshine – Tottenham was previously within this former local government area.
