= John A. Tully =

Australian historian and novelist (born 1947)

- Born: 1947 (age 78–79); Tyneside, England, United Kingdom
- Occupations: Rigger and writer
- Title: Honorary Professor

Academic background
- Education: UTas
- Alma mater: Monash University

Academic work
- Discipline: History
- Sub-discipline: Social history
- Institutions: Victoria University
- Main interests: Labor history
- Website: Publications by John Tully at ResearchGate

John A. Tully is an Australian historian and novelist.

== Biography ==
Tully was born on Tyneside in northern England in 1947 and is descended from English and Irish forebears. He is a socialist and was an active trade unionist during the many years he worked as a rigger in construction and heavy industry before gaining his doctorate and becoming an academic. Tully is an Honorary Professor in the College of Arts and Education at Victoria University in Melbourne, Australia. He is the author of eleven published books and a number of articles, book reviews and short stories. His books have been reviewed in several notable publications, including the Cleveland Review of Books. Tully lived for many years in the inner western Melbourne suburb of Yarraville. He now lives at Dover in the far south of Tasmania, the state in which he grew up.

Tully is an active supporter of the Kurdish freedom struggle. In 2021, he publicly called for the release of Abdullah Öcalan and for the Kurdistan Workers' Party to be de-proscribed as a terrorist group by the Australian Government.

== Bibliography ==
History

- Cambodia Under the Tricolour: King Sisowath and the 'Mission Civilisatrice', 1904-1927, (Clayton, Victoria: Monash Asia Institute, 1999)
- France on the Mekong: A History of the Protectorate in Cambodia, 1863-1953, (Lanham, Maryland: University Press of America, 2002)
- A Short History of Cambodia: From Empire to Survival, (Sydney and Chiang Mai: Allen & Unwin and Silkworm, 2006)
- The Devil's Milk: A Social History of Rubber (New York: Monthly Review Press, 2011)

German translation: John Tully, trans. Klaus E. Lehmann,Teufelsmilch: Eine Sozialgeschichte des Gummis (Cologne: Neuer Isp Verlag, 2021)

- Silvertown: The lost story of a strike that shook London and helped launch the modern labor movement (New York and London: Monthly Review Press and Lawrence & Wishart,2014)
- Crooked Deals and Broken Treaties: How American Indians Were Displaced By White Settlers in the Cuyahoga Valley (New York: Monthly Review Press, 2016)
- Labor in Akron, Ohio,1825-1945 (Akron, OH: University of Akron Press, 2021)

Book Chapter "Cambodia in the Nineteenth Century: Out of the French Frying Pan and into the French Fire?" in T. O. Smith (ed.) Cambodia and the West, 1500-2000 (London: Palgrave Macmillan, 2018)

Journal Articles

- "Modern Cambodia Since 1863". Oxford Research Encyclopedia of Asian History. OREs. 2017. doi:10.1093/acrefore/9780190277727.013.241.
- "Silvertown 1889: The East End's Great Forgotten Strike", Labour History Review, (Liverpool: Liverpool University Press, 2014)
- “'Nothing but Rebels': Union Sisters at the Sydney Rubber Works, 1918-42", Labour History (Sydney: Australian Society for the Study of Labour History, Issue 103, November 2012, pp. 59–89)
- "A Victorian Ecological Disaster: Imperialism, the Telegraph, and Gutta-Percha", Journal of World History, Vol.20, No.4, pp. 559–579. (Honolulu: University of Hawaiʻi Press, December 2009, pp. 559–579)

Novels

- Death Is the Cool Night, (Melbourne: Papyrus Publishing, 1999)
- Dark Clouds on the Mountain (Melbourne: Hybrid Publishers, 2010)
- Robbed of Every Blessing (Melbourne: Hybrid Publishers, 2015)
- On An Alien Shore (Melbourne: Hybrid Publishers, 2019)
