= Mohamed Semra =

Australian politician

Mohamed Semra (born 1998) is an Australian politician. He has served as the Mayor of the City of Maribyrnong from June 2026.

He is the first person of Sub-Saharan African descent to be elected mayor in Australia. He has been described by Australian cultural commentators such as The Paris End as 'Mamdani on the Maribyrnong', and noted for his competence in using social media platforms such as TikTok.

Prior to politics, in 2023 Mohamed was a nominee for Young Australian of the year, and was co-founder of the local community organisation Endeavour Youth Australia.

His mayoral campaign was the subject of Australian feature documentary Australian Story.
