= City of Maribyrnong =

Coordinates: 37°48′S 144°54′E

- Local government area
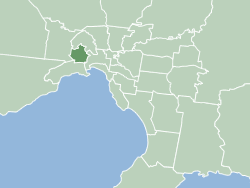
- Map of Melbourne showing location of City of Maribyrnong.

- Interactive map of City of Maribyrnong
- Country: Australia
- State: Victoria
- Region: Greater Melbourne
- Established: 1994
- Council seat: Footscray

Government
  - Mayor: Mohamed Semra
  - State electorates: Footscray; Laverton; Williamstown
  - Federal division: Fraser

Area
  - Total: 31.2 km^{2} (12.0 sq mi)

Population
  - Total: 91,387 (2018)
  - Density: 2,929/km^{2} (7,586/sq mi)
- Website: City of Maribyrnong
LGAs around City of Maribyrnong
Brimbank	Moonee Valley	Moonee Valley
Brimbank	City of Maribyrnong	Melbourne
Hobsons Bay	Hobsons Bay	Melbourne

The City of Maribyrnong (/ˈmærəbənɒŋ/) is a local government area within the metropolitan area of Melbourne, Australia. It comprises the inner western suburbs between 5 and 10 kilometres from Melbourne city centre. In June 2018, Maribyrnong had a population of 91,387.

According to Local Government Victoria, Maribyrnong has the second most ethnically diverse population in Victoria, with 40% of residents born outside Australia.

Many of Maribyrnong's former industrial sites have been replaced by residential developments. New residents are generally more educated and higher income.

== History ==
The City of Maribyrnong was formed on 15 December 1994 from the merger of parts of the City of Sunshine and the City of Footscray, except its suburb of South Kingsville (which was transferred to the City of Hobsons Bay). The name was taken from the Maribyrnong River, which forms the eastern and northern boundary of the LGA.

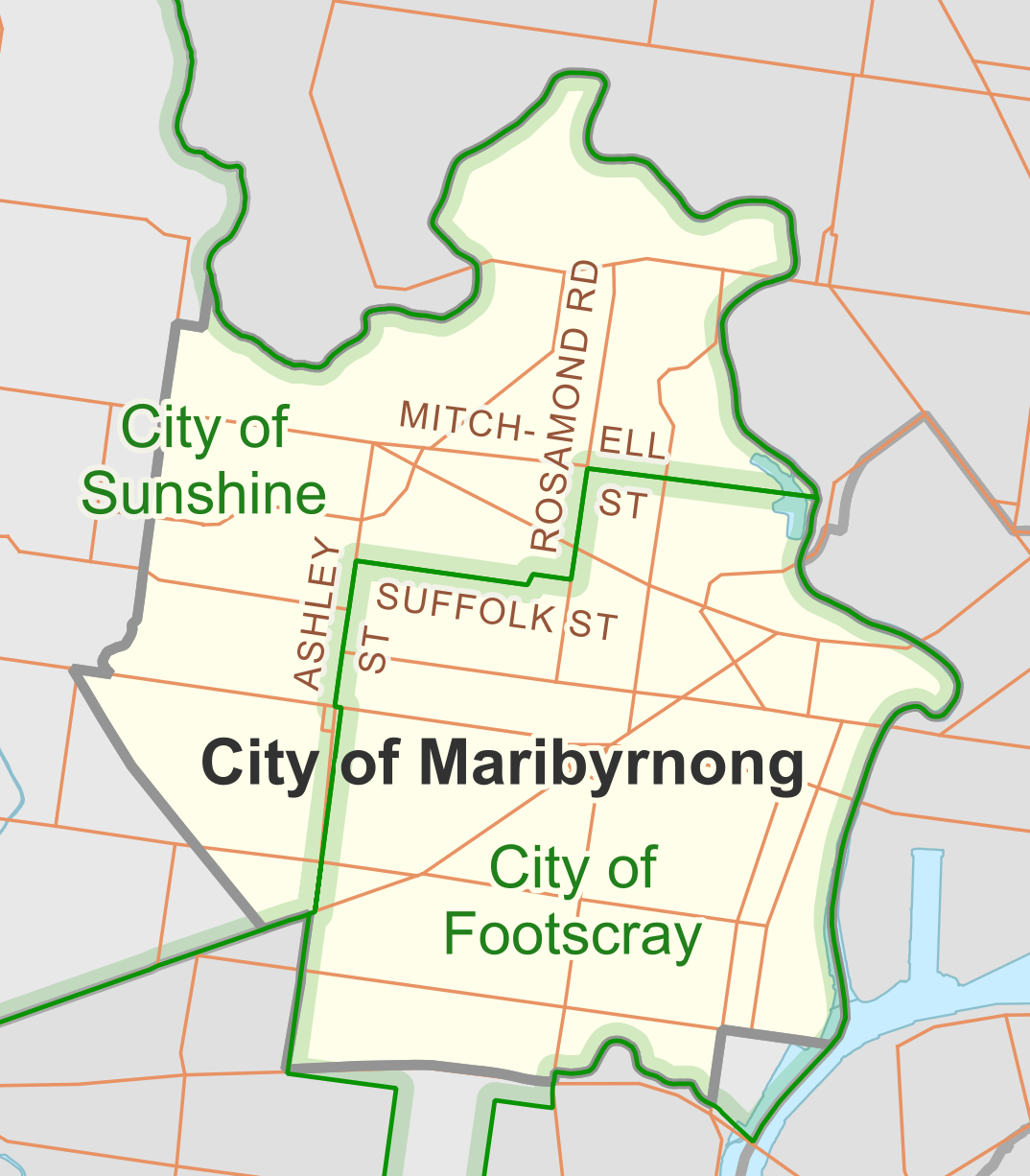
The City's predecessor LGAs (green) as they were in 1994

== Council ==
City of Maribyrnong

Leadership
- Mayor: Mohamed Semra
- Deputy Mayor: Samantha Meredith

Structure
- Council political groups: Community Labor (3); Greens (3); Independent (1)

Meeting place
- Footscray Town Hall, Footscray, Victoria, Australia
- 2024 ward boundaries. Expand the map and click on a ward to see the ward name

Ward	Party	Councillor	Notes
Bluestone	Community Labor	Pradeep Tiwari	
Braybrook	Community Labor	Cuc Lam	
Burndap	Independent	Mohamed Semra	Mayor
River	Community Labor	Susan Yengi	
Saltwater	Greens	Samantha Meredith	Deputy Mayor
Sheoak	Greens	Bernadette Thomas	
Wattle	Greens	Elena Pereyra	

== Election results ==
=== 2024 ===
2024 Victorian local elections: Maribyrnong
Party	Votes	%	Swing	Seats	Change
Community Labor	15,914	35.35	+5.53	3	Steady
Independents	10,190	22.74	−10.12	1	Steady
Greens	9,947	22.10	+8.43	3	▲1
Victorian Socialists	5,718	12.70	+3.67	0	▼1
Independent Labor	1,438	3.19	+3.19	0	Steady
Ind. Democratic Labour	926	2.05	-0.06	0	Steady
Independent Liberal	837	1.86	−5.93	0	Steady
Formal votes	45,015	97.28			
Informal votes	1,255	2.72			
Total	46,270	100.00		7	Steady
Registered voters / turnout	59,078	78.32			

=== 2020 ===
2020 Victorian local elections: Maribyrnong
Party	Votes	%	Swing	Seats	Change
Independent	15,152	32.86		1	
Labor	13,746	29.82		3	
Greens	6,299	13.66		2	
Victorian Socialists	4,169	9.04		1	▲1
Independent Liberal	3,591	7.79		0	
Sustainable Australia	1,626	3.53		0	Steady
Democratic Labour	973	2.11		0	Steady
Progressives	547	1.19		0	Steady
Formal votes	46,103				

== Community snapshot ==
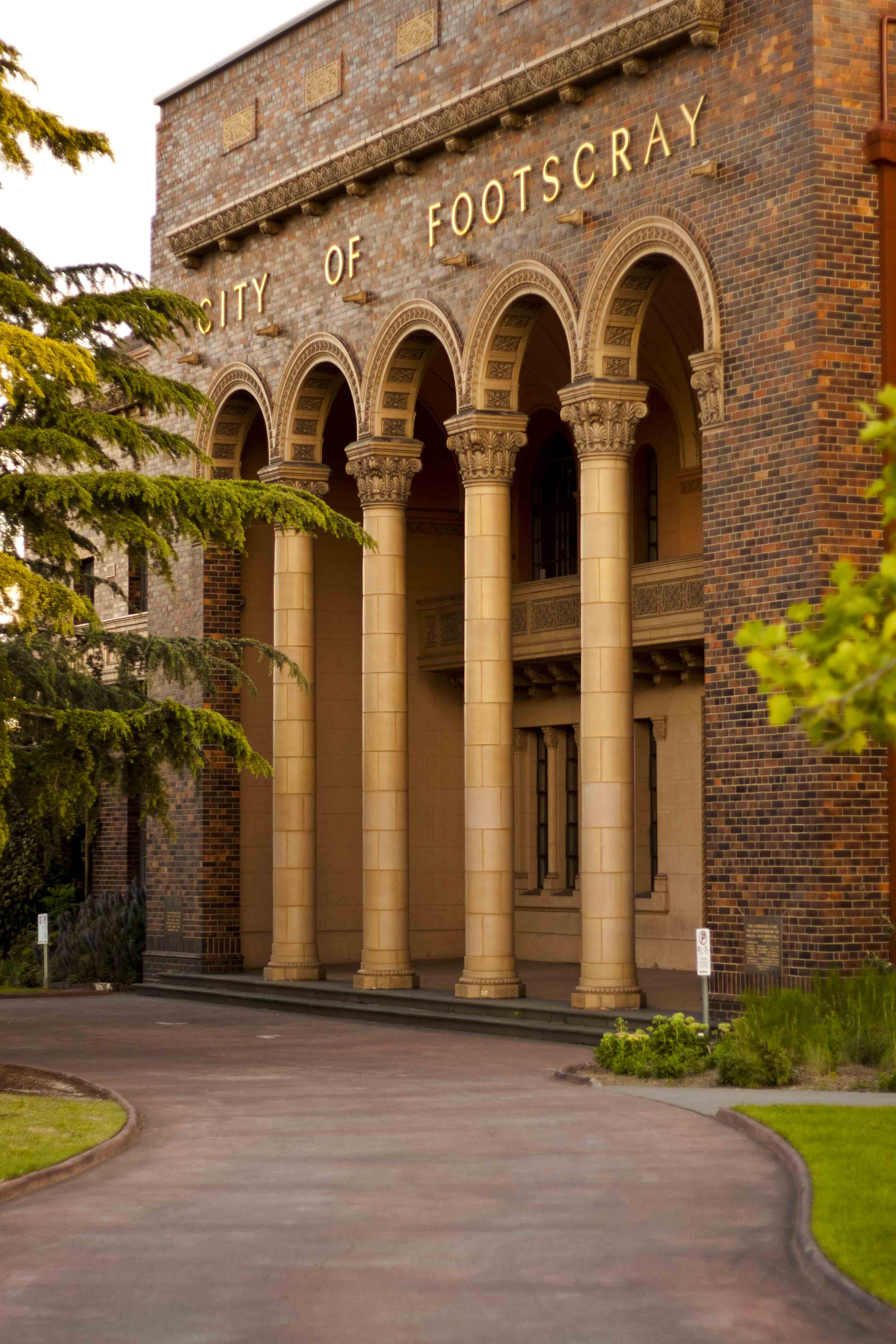
Civic Offices, on the corner of Napier and Hyde Streets, Footscray

Figures below are drawn from the 2011 Census unless otherwise stated.

=== Population and Cultural Diversity ===
- The Estimated Residential Population at 30 June 2012 was 76,703
- 323 people (0.5%) identified as Aboriginal or Torres Strait Islander.
- 40% of the population were born overseas and 43% speak a language other than English.
- The largest non-English language groups include Vietnamese, Cantonese, Mandarin, Greek, Italian and Spanish.
- 9.9% of the population do not speak English well or at all.

=== Social and Economic Disadvantage ===
- Braybrook and the City of Maribyrnong are the 4th most disadvantaged suburb and municipality respectively, in the metropolitan area on the SEIFA index of disadvantage.
- The unemployment rate is relatively high. As of the September 2012 quarter, the unemployment rate was 7.9% for the City compared to the Melbourne average of 5.5%, and the national average of 5.2%.
- Unemployment is highest in Braybrook which has an unemployment rate of 15%

=== Households and Housing ===
- Average size is 2.4 people.
- Average weekly income is $1,258.
- 25% are couples with children.
- 26% are couples without children.
- 25% consist of a single individual.
- 70.6% have an internet connection.
- 35.5% occupy rental housing (both public and private).
- Median weekly rent was

$380 (versus $300 for Greater Melbourne).

- The median housing payment was $2,167 (versus $1,810 for Greater Melbourne).

=== Health and Wellbeing ===
- The top three chronic, preventable, lifestyle diseases for females are heart disease, type 2 diabetes and depression
- The top three for males are heart disease, lung cancer and stroke.
- Females experience the poorest health in the sub-region with a disease burden rate of 134.9 disability adjusted life years per 1,000.
- Males have the lowest life expectancy in Victoria at 74.8 years.
- Approximately 1 in 5 people have a disability.
- 7.1% have experienced food insecurity (not having access to enough food for an active and healthy life)

== Emerging cultural groups ==
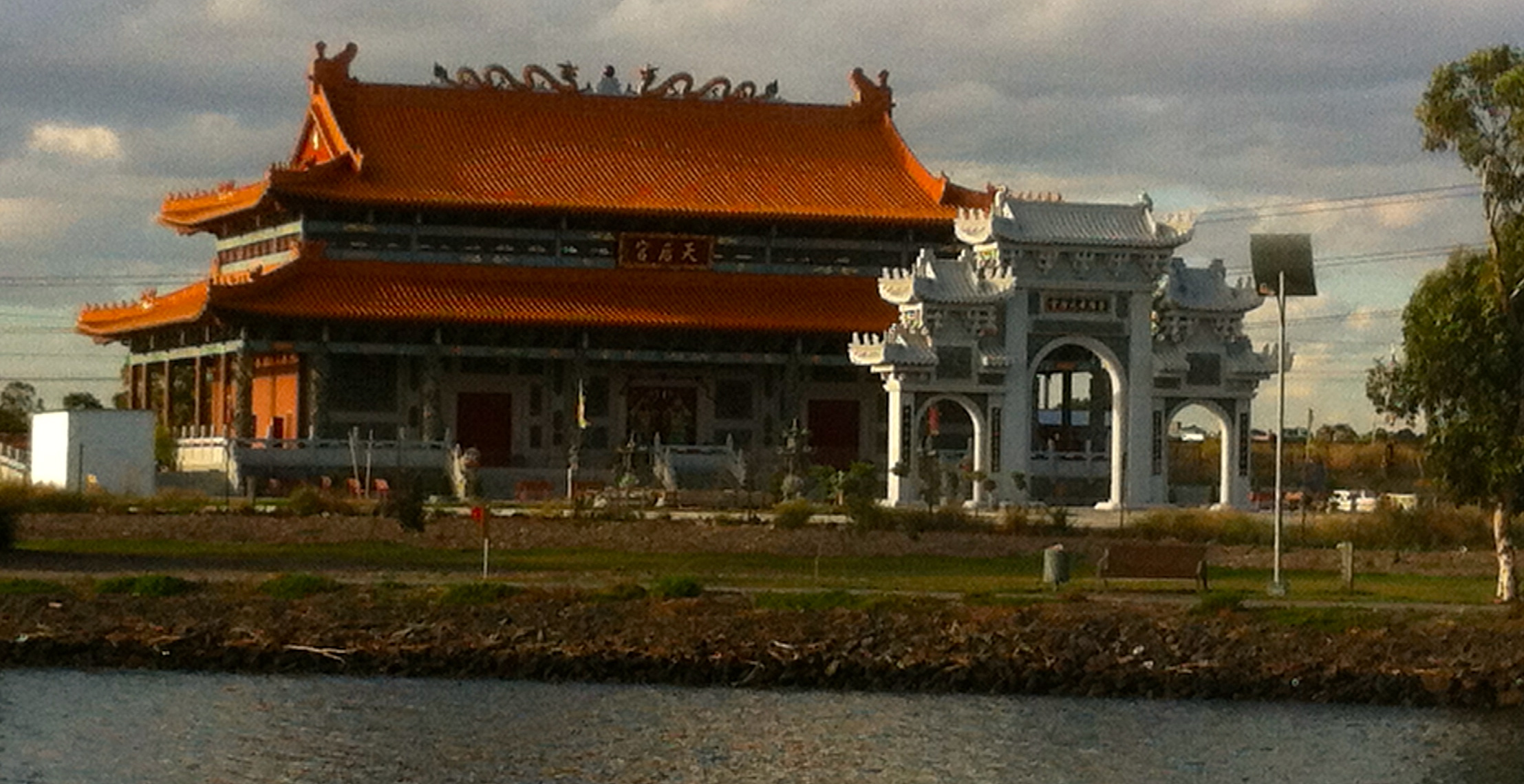
The Heavenly Queen Temple, Australia's largest Chinese temple, opened in Footscray in 2015.

Between 2003 and 2008, the city welcomed 4,769 new arrivals. The majority were skilled economic migrants (46%), followed by family migration (33%), and humanitarian entrants (21%).

Key statistics:

- A large proportion of arrivals under humanitarian migration arrived with low to poor English language skills.
- The majority of new arrivals were in the 20–29 year age bracket, with the majority male.
- A large percentage of arrivals are from India, China, Bangladesh and Pakistan and are settling through the skilled migration stream.
- Over 90% of new arrivals from Burma and Sudan are humanitarian migrants.
- Family migration is significant from Vietnam and the United Kingdom.

== Business ==
Approximately 5,392 businesses employ in excess of 35,000 people, although the resident workforce is only around 28,246. Manufacturing was the largest employer of residents with 3,451 employees, followed by retail with 2,668, health care 2,576; scientific and technical services 2,185 and education with 2,145. Key employers include Victoria University, Western Health, Lonely Planet, Highpoint Shopping Centre, Western Bulldogs, Mobil Australia and Sugar Australia (CSR).

On average, 34% of the labour force has university qualifications. In some neighbourhoods the proportion reaches 53%. The highest concentration of university qualified residents is in the Footscray/Seddon/Yarraville corridor.

== Education ==
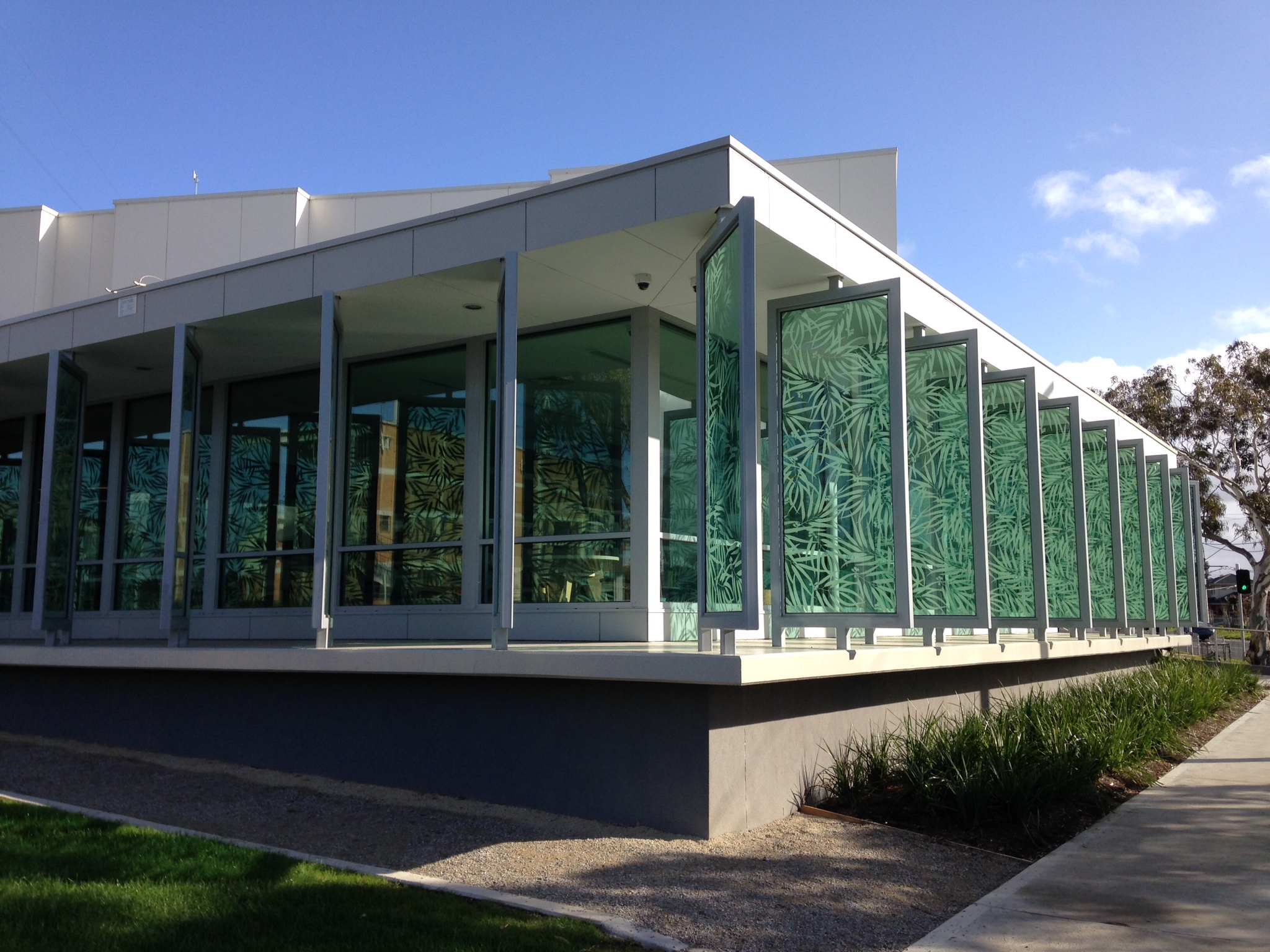
Braybrook library

=== Tertiary ===
Victoria University has two principal campuses located in Footscray with a student population of around 15,000 and staff of almost 1,200. This represents the largest concentration of tertiary activity in Melbourne's West. Victoria University is Maribyrnong City Council's largest employer, second only to Western Health.

=== Secondary ===
Five secondary schools employ approximately 530 staff and enroll more than 4,000 students. Maribyrnong Secondary College became Victoria's first public elite sports school.

=== Libraries ===
Reflecting the multiculturalism of the community, the library service has a large amount of non-English material. The Council library service has five branches:

- Footscray Library
- Maribyrnong Library at Highpoint Shopping Centre
- West Footscray Library
- Yarraville Library (planned relocation to Bradmill Precinct)
- Braybrook Library (opened in March 2015)

== Transport ==
=== Bus ===
Numerous bus routes serve Maribyrnong, providing transport connections within and beyond the LGA.

=== Tram ===
Two tram routes operate within the Maribyrnong LGA:

- Route 57 West Maribyrnong ↔ Flinders Street Station
- Route 82 Moonee Ponds ↔ Footscray

=== Railway ===
The City of Maribyrnong has six train stations on the metropolitan rail network, all in fare zone 1.

Station	Lines
Footscray	Sunbury Werribee Williamstown V/Line
Middle Footscray	Sunbury
West Footscray	Sunbury
Tottenham	Sunbury
Seddon	Werribee Williamstown
Yarraville	Werribee Williamstown

== Townships and localities ==
The city had a population of 85,209 at the 2021 census, up from 82,288 at the 2016 census.

Population
Locality	2016	2021
Braybrook	9,195	9,682
Footscray	16,345	17,131
Kingsville	3,946	3,920
Maidstone	9,032	9,389
Maribyrnong	12,216	12,573
Seddon	5,123	5,143
Tottenham	3	3
West Footscray	11,450	11,729
Yarraville	14,965	15,636

^ - Territory divided with another LGA

== See also ==
- List of places on the Victorian Heritage Register in the City of Maribyrnong
