= Yarraville =

- Suburb
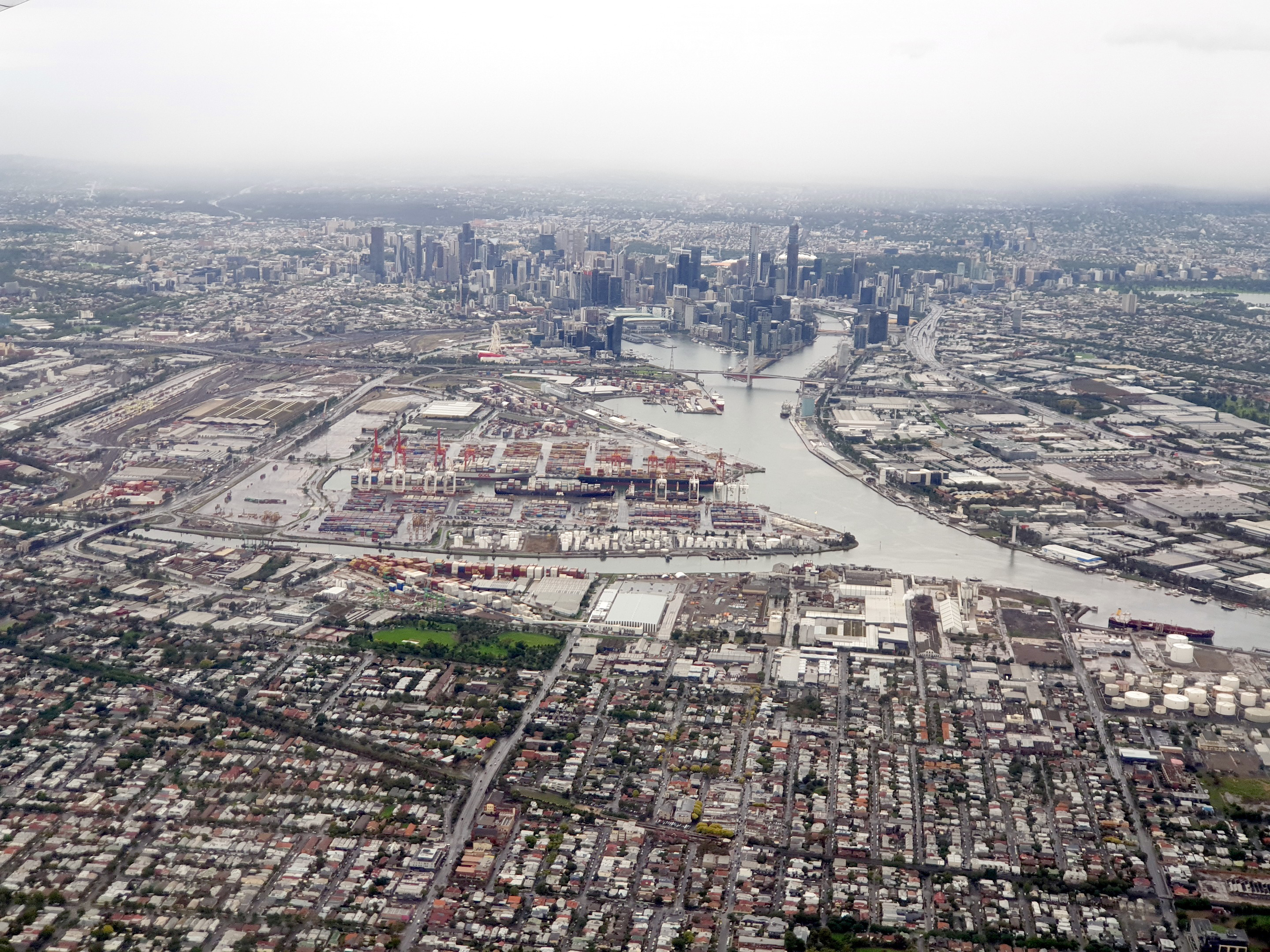
- Aerial view looking east over Yarraville towards the Port of Melbourne and Melbourne CBD

- Interactive map of Yarraville
- Coordinates: 37.817°S 144.890°E
- Country: Australia
- State: Victoria
- City: Melbourne
- LGA: City of Maribyrnong
- Location: 6 km (3.7 mi) from Melbourne CBD

Government
  - State electorates: Footscray; Williamstown
  - Federal division: Fraser

Area
  - Total: 5.7 km^{2} (2.2 sq mi)
- Elevation: 17 m (56 ft)

Population
  - Total: 15,636 (2021 census)
  - Density: 2,743/km^{2} (7,100/sq mi)
- Postcode: 3013
Suburbs around Yarraville
West Footscray	Kingsville	Seddon
Brooklyn	Yarraville	West Melbourne
Altona North	Spotswood	Port Melbourne

Yarraville is an inner suburb in Melbourne, Victoria, Australia, 6 km (3.7 mi) west of Melbourne's central business district, located within the City of Maribyrnong local government area. Yarraville recorded a population of 15,636 at the 2021 census.

Yarraville is bordered on the east by the junction of the Maribyrnong and the Yarra Rivers, and its southern boundary is the West Gate Freeway.

In 2020, Yarraville was named Australia's best suburb and fifth in the world. The suburb lies immediately north of the West Gate Bridge, and immediately west of its namesake, the Yarra River. Features of Yarraville include C.J. Cruickshank Park, Yarraville Oval, Beaton Reserve, Yarraville Gardens, and Stony Creek.

== History ==
Yarraville was named due to its proximity to the Yarra River. It was subdivided in 1859, and the residential development of the area commenced. In 1859, a railway line from Footscray to Williamstown was opened, which prompted land sales in the area. A large party to announce the subdivision was thrown, however the railway line operators declined to build a station at Yarraville. During the decade of 1870, a railway stop and post office were opened, Methodists established the area's first church, and a new primary school commenced operating. By 1880, Yarraville was developing into a hub for factories due to the ease of movement of goods via the nearby rail and Yarra River. Yarraville is situated on basaltic land, and bluestone was extracted for ballast for boats on the Yarra River and Port Phillip Bay.

A major influence on this industrial growth was the establishment of Cuming, Smith & Co. in 1872. Founded by Scottish-born chemist and civic leader James Cuming Sr., the firm’s sulphuric acid and fertiliser works became one of the suburb’s largest employers and shaped Yarraville’s identity as a manufacturing centre.
Cuming supported local institutions and improvements, and his role is commemorated by a marble bust in Yarraville Gardens, sculpted by Margaret Baskerville.

Throughout the 1880s, the area attracted engineers, iron founders, and rope-makers. Roads linking Yarraville with greater Melbourne were poor, however as railway and water connections improved, Yarraville became an attractive industrial location.

In the 1950s, a sustained period of migration to Yarraville assisted in rapid development of the area. Many people of Greek origin were part of this migration trend. Commencing in the 1990s, the demographics of Yarraville started to change, resulting in what is now described as a "gentrified, trendy and hip area".

=== Heritage listings ===
The following places in Yarraville are listed on the Victorian Heritage Register:

- CSR sugar refinery complex, at 265 Whitehall Street
- State Savings Bank building, at 13 Ballarat Street
- Sun Theatre, at 6-12 Ballarat Street
- Yarraville railway station complex, on Goulburn and Murray Streets, inclusive of the Interlocking Railway Crossing Gates on Anderson Street

== Yarraville Village ==
Located near Yarraville railway station on Anderson and Ballarat Streets, Yarraville is renowned in Melbourne for its unique character, architecture and quality of village life. Anderson and Ballarat Streets, in the heart of the Yarraville Village, are lined with refurbished 19th century buildings and dotted with neighbourhood cafés, restaurants and boutique shops.

This village atmosphere is anchored by the restored Sun Theatre and the adjacent Sun Bookshop, a prominent landmark in the Yarraville community with its unique art deco architecture and its 6 cinemas. Notable examples of Edwardian and Victorian architecture can be found in Yarraville.

The Yarraville Village is home to many award-winning restaurants and cafes. A reflection of Melbourne's multicultural nature, Yarraville offers an array of world cuisine styles including Greek, Italian, Modern Asian, Indian, Polish, Mexican, Thai, Chinese and Modern Australian.

Shops in the village include a book store, the work of a local artist, clothing and jewellery, wines, gourmet foods, two supermarkets, a health food store and a florist.

== Administration ==
=== Local government ===
The administration of Yarraville is managed by the City of Maribyrnong. The suburb is spread across 3 Wards: Wattle, Sheoak, and Saltwater.

== Transportation ==
=== Trains ===
Yarraville railway station is a suburban railway station on the Werribee and Williamstown railway lines. The station is serviced by all trains on the Williamstown line, and Laverton bound trains on the Werribee line. The station is located centrally in Yarraville Village near Anderson Street; accessed via Birmingham Street to the North (for trains heading towards the city), and Woods Street on the South (heading away from the city). Travel time between Yarraville station and the CBD is approximately 15 minutes, and the station is within the Zone 1 region of Melbourne's public transport ticketing system.

=== Buses ===
Several bus routes also service the suburb:

- 223 Yarraville ↔ Highpoint SC
- 409 Yarraville ↔ Highpoint SC via Footscray
- 431 Yarraville Station ↔ Kingsville via Somerville Rd
- 432 Newport ↔ Yarraville via Altona Gate SC
- 472 Williamstown ↔ Moonee Ponds via Footscray

== Places of worship ==
There are many religious organisations and places of worship in Yarraville, including Baptist, Buddhist, Catholic, The Church of Jesus Christ of Latter-day Saints, Orthodox and Uniting Church.

Yarraville also houses the Victorian International Buddhist College and Greek Orthodox Language school.

== Community ==
=== Arts and culture ===
The area possesses a few musical collectives including the Footscray – Yarraville City Band and the Yarraville Mouth Organ Band. The main film society in the area is the Sun Theatre, located in Yarraville Village. There is also the Yarraville Community Centre which provides a range of resources, classes, activities and services for all ages and abilities.

Yarraville Markets is held on the first Saturday and Sunday of each month. The market is held in the Masonic Hall (Corner of Willis Street and Canterbury Street Yarraville) from 10 am till 3 pm. Everything sold at the market is handmade and/or Australian Made.

=== Festivals ===
The annual Yarraville Festival is held in Yarraville Village and continues to be a major cultural event in the community. The festival caters for more than 25,000 people and is professionally operated by a team of dedicated volunteers that reside in Yarraville. Street performers, carnival amusements, art exhibitions, teddy bear picnics, fashion parades, poetry readings, market stalls and performances across many stages, provide an array of entertainment for all.

Since 2016 the annual Albanian Australian Community Festival has been held at Yarraville Gardens after relocating from Footscray park in 2015.

=== Parks ===
There are two public major parks in Yarraville, the Yarraville Gardens and Beaton Reserve. Both contain pristine flowerbeds with areas for leisure and relaxation.

Other parks include:

- Angliss Reserve
- Bellairs Park
- Cruickshank Park
- Fels Park
- Frederick Street Reserve
- Fyans Morven Reserve
- Goods Yard
- Hanmer Reserve
- Hyde Street Reserve
- Love Street Reserve
- McIvor Reserve
- McNish Reserve
- Sandford Grove Reserve
- Sinking Village
- Stony Creek Reserve

=== Sport ===
Swimming facilities for Yarraville residents are at the Yarraville Swim Centre, 3 Roberts Street West Footscray and at the Maribyrnong Aquatic Centre, Maribyrnong, located next to Highpoint Shopping Centre. The aquatic centre also provides yoga, gym facilities and other recreational activities.

There are many sporting clubs located in Yarraville such as:

- Yarraville Glory Football Club (soccer), established in 1966 and with a rich Greek and local heritage.
- Footscray Baseball Club
- Yarraville Cricket Club
- Seddon Cricket Club
- With its neighbouring suburb Yarraville has an Australian Rules football team, Yarraville-Seddon Eagles, competing in the Western Region Football League. They are located at Yarraville Oval)
- Footscray Hockey Club
- Footscray Lacrosse Club
- South Park Rangers Soccer Club
- Yarraville Tennis Club
- Yarraville Trugo Club
- Footscray Angliss Cricket Club – formerly Footscray ANA CC

Cyclists in Yarraville are represented by MazzaBUG, the Maribyrnong Bicycle User Group.

== Media ==
Yarraville was the backdrop of the 1999 feature film The Wog Boy, and was mentioned in the 1992 Australian film Spotswood. Yarraville was also the location for the Network Ten TV series 'The Wrong Girl'. It was chosen for its unique village and inner city location.

Two free, weekly suburban newspapers are distributed in Yarraville. The Maribyrnong Leader is part of the News Corporation-owned Leader Newspapers group and The Mail is part of the Fairfax Community Newspapers Victoria. Both are distributed every Wednesday.

== Education ==
Primary schools in the immediate Yarraville area are:

- St. Augustine's Primary School (Previously known as St. Augustine's College, Yarraville)
- Kingsville Primary School
- Wembley Primary School
- Yarraville West Primary School

== Notable people ==
- Rebecca Barnard – singer, songwriter, choir leader
- Gordon Binns – ornithologist, born in Yarraville.
- James Cuming (1835–1911) – Scottish-born chemist, industrialist, and civic leader. Co-founder of Cuming, Smith & Co. in Yarraville, multiple-term mayor of Footscray, benefactor of the University of Melbourne and local hospitals, and inaugural president of the Footscray Football Club (later the Western Bulldogs).
- James Cuming (1861–1920) – industrial chemist and business leader. Directed Cuming, Smith & Co. during its expansion into phosphate rock fertilisers and was general manager after the 1897 merger with Felton, Grimwade & Co.
- Josh Giddey- Basketballer
- Ross Hannaford – Australian rock guitarist with Daddy Cool, The Pink Finks and The Mighty Kong
- Adam Hills – comedian and host of Spicks and Specks lives in Yarraville.
- Ron Hutchinson, jockey
- Ali McGregor – opera singer, actress and cabaret performer
- Luke Mathews – Australian Olympic athlete
- Dave O'Neil – comedian, radio personality and former cub scout
- Liam Picken – Australian Rules Football Player (Western Bulldogs)
- Nicola Roxon – Former Attorney-General of Australia, Minister for Health and Member of Parliament for Gellibrand
- Albert Tucker- artist, was born in Yarraville in 1919.
- John A. Tully – author and historian at Victoria University in Melbourne, Australia

== Environmental issues ==
=== Air pollution ===
An easy way for freight trucks to access Melbourne's city center and Port of Melbourne is to go through Yarraville's Somerville and Williamstown roads. As a consequence, these residential areas suffer from ultra fine particle pollution and community groups like Save Willy Road and Maribyrnong Trucking Action Group have been created to campaign against this issue.

=== Dust pollution ===
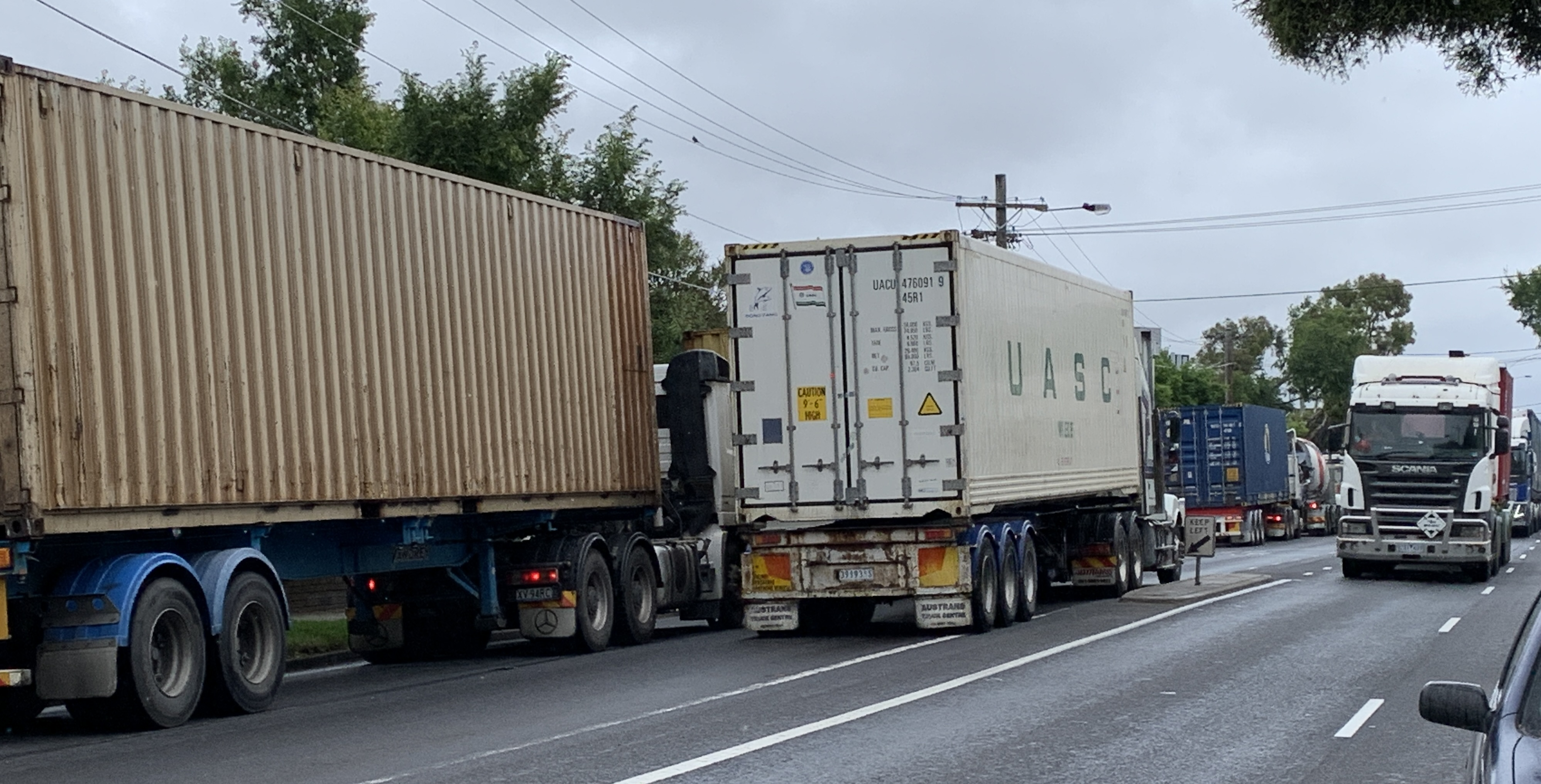
Trucks on Francis Street, Yarraville heading to and from the city

In March 2023, several pollution reports were received by EPA Victoria for the former Bradmill site on Francis Street, Yarraville. The Winslow Group was preparing the site for future development and did some earthmoving activities which produced dust pollution and tracking dirt onto Francis Street. EPA issued several notices to improve dust controls, manage risks and create an air quality management plan.

The site was previously inspected for a similar dust problem in 2022.

== See also ==
- City of Footscray – Yarraville was previously within this former local government area.
- City of Maribyrnong – Yarraville is located within this local government area.

== Gallery ==
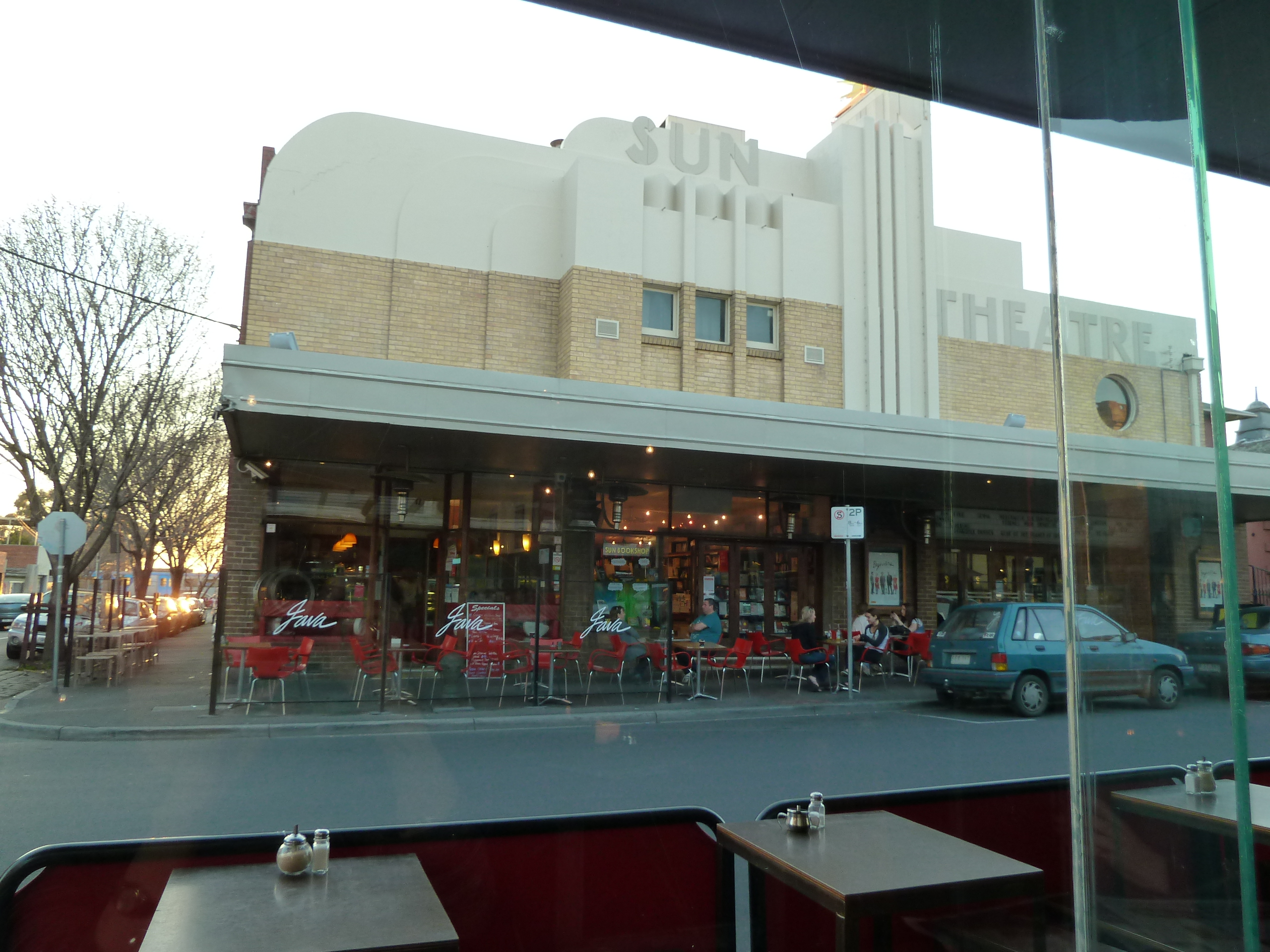
The Sun Theatre cinema in Yarraville

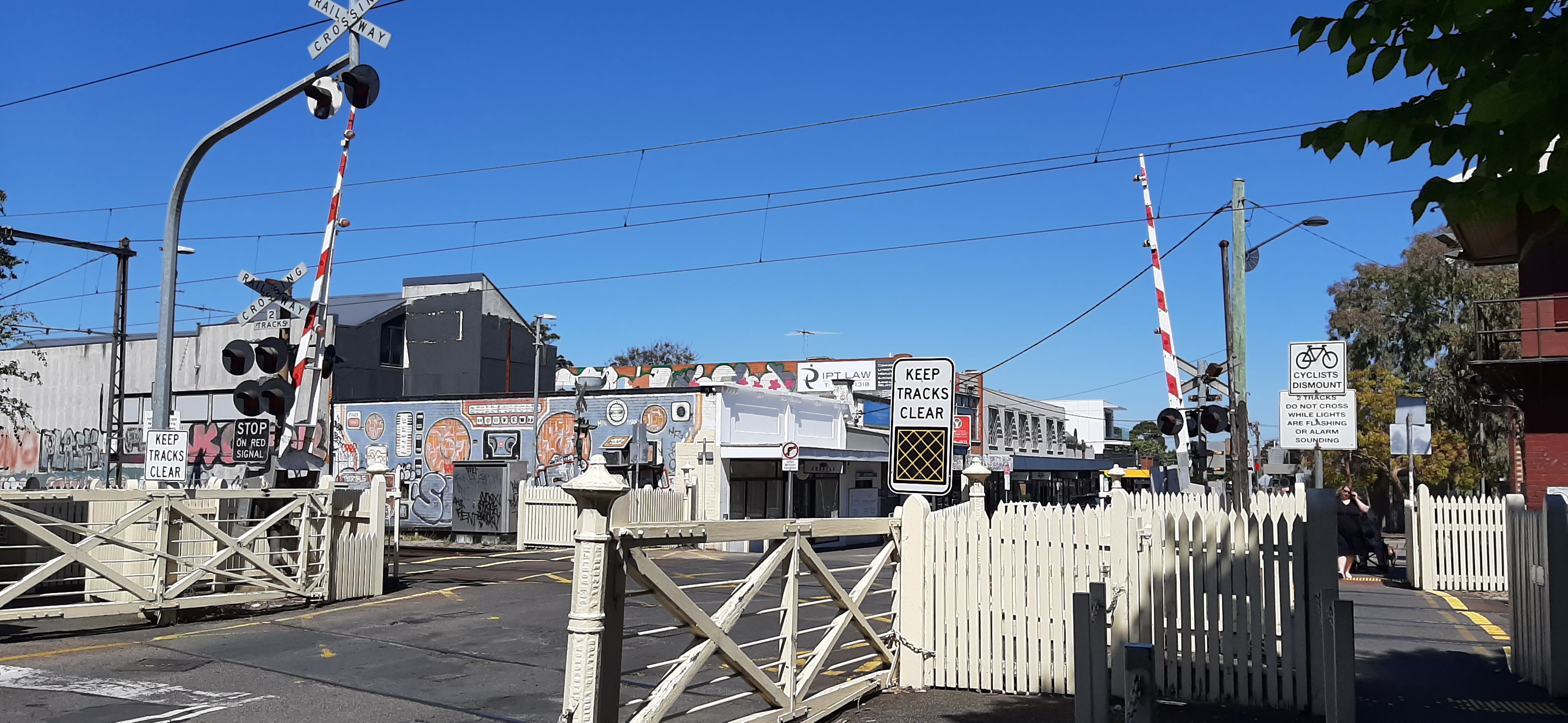
Interlocking Railway Crossing Gates at Yarraville station

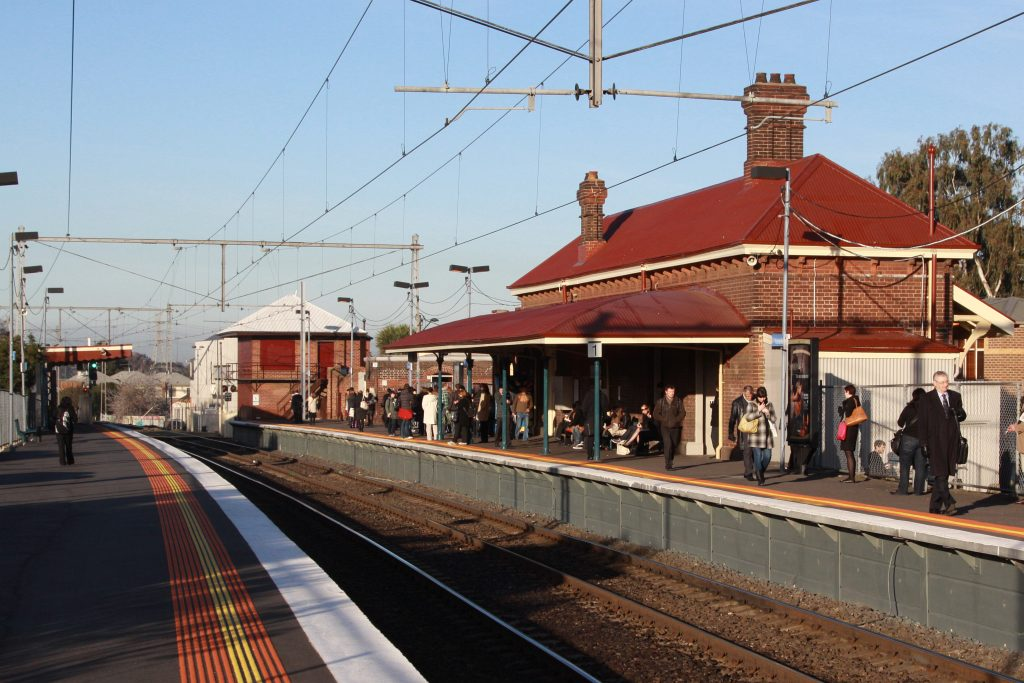
Yarraville railway station

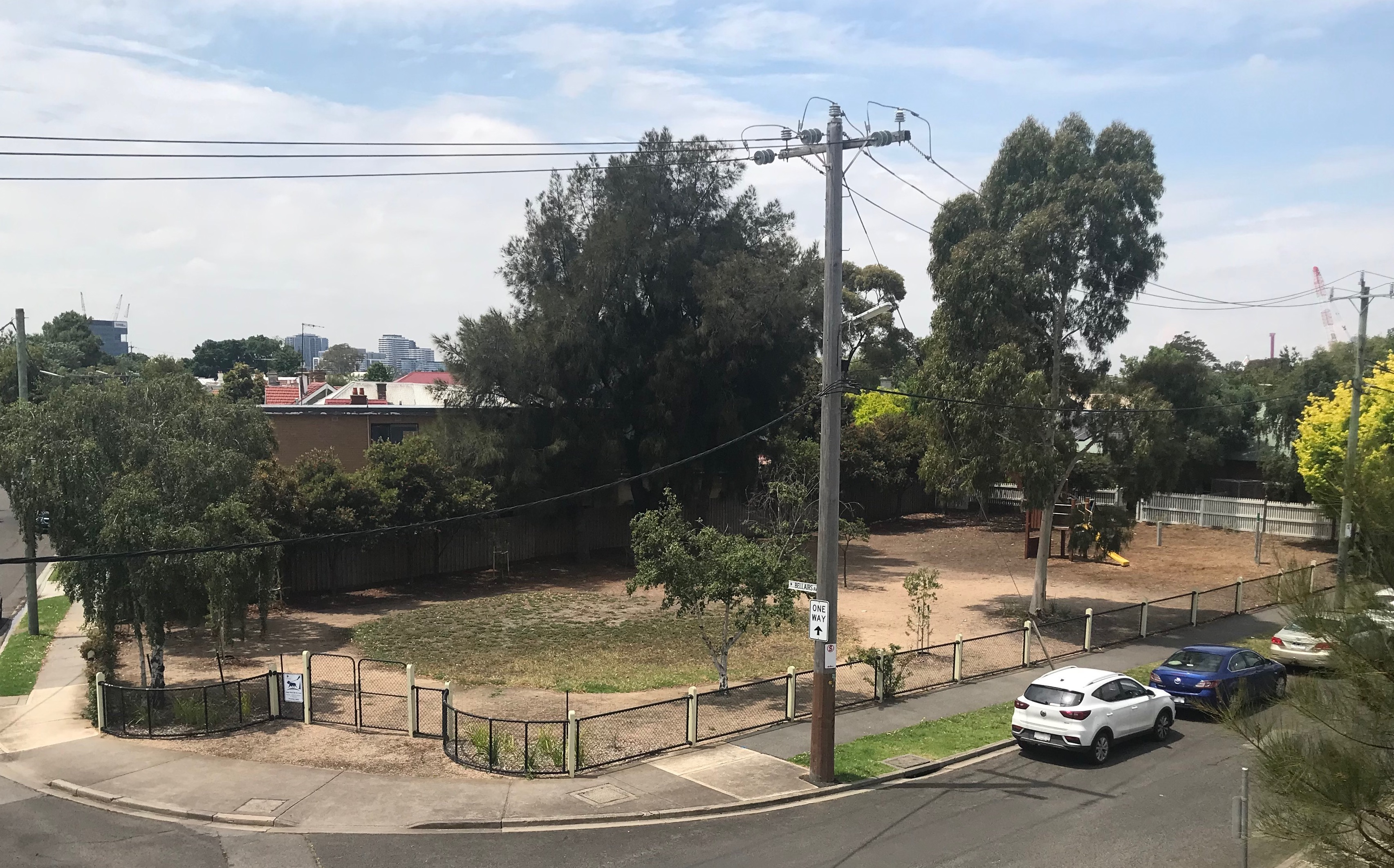
Bellairs Avenue Playground in Yarraville

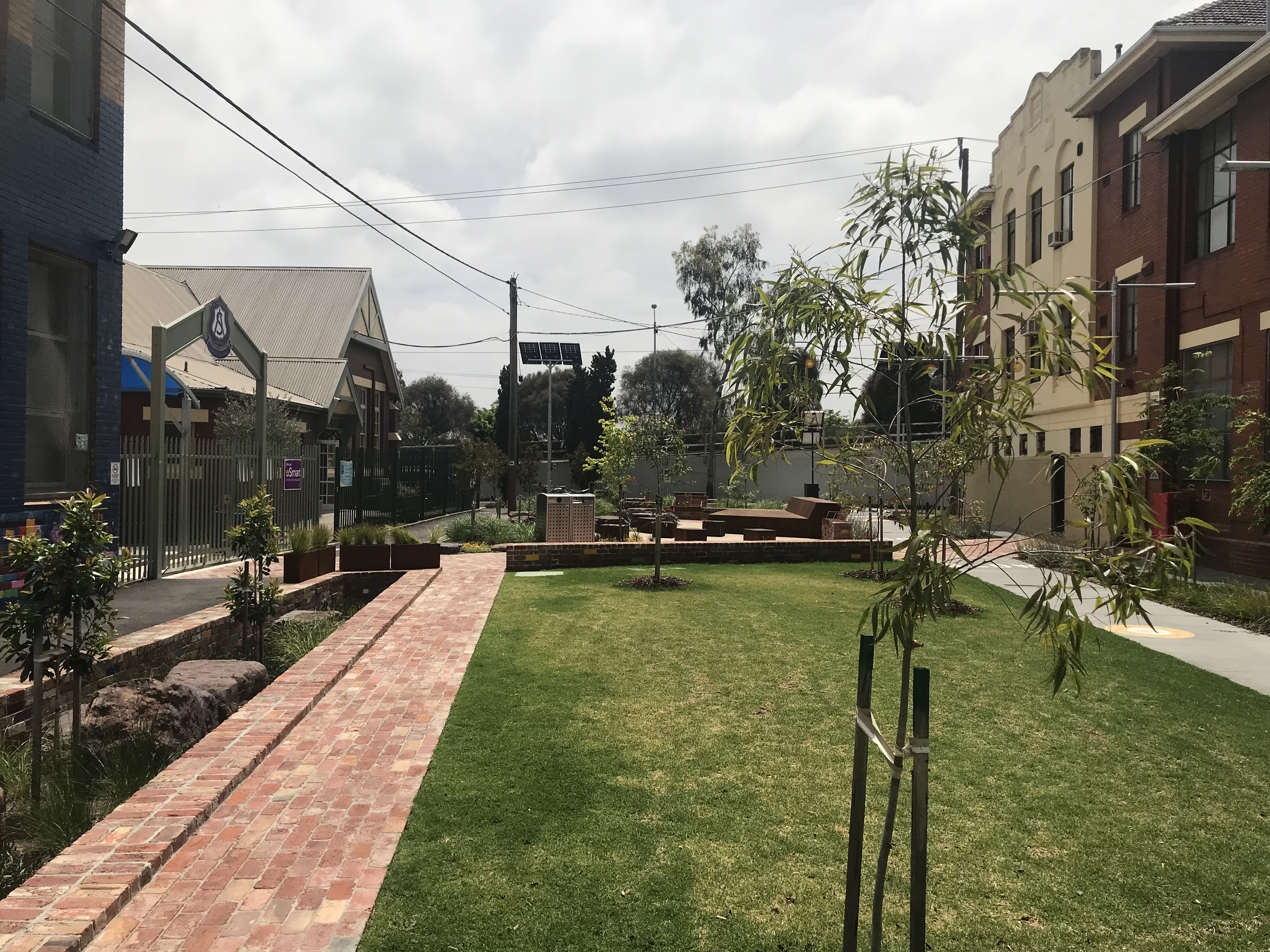
Birmingham Street Park in Yarraville
