= Tottenham railway station =

Railway station in Melbourne, Australia

Tottenham
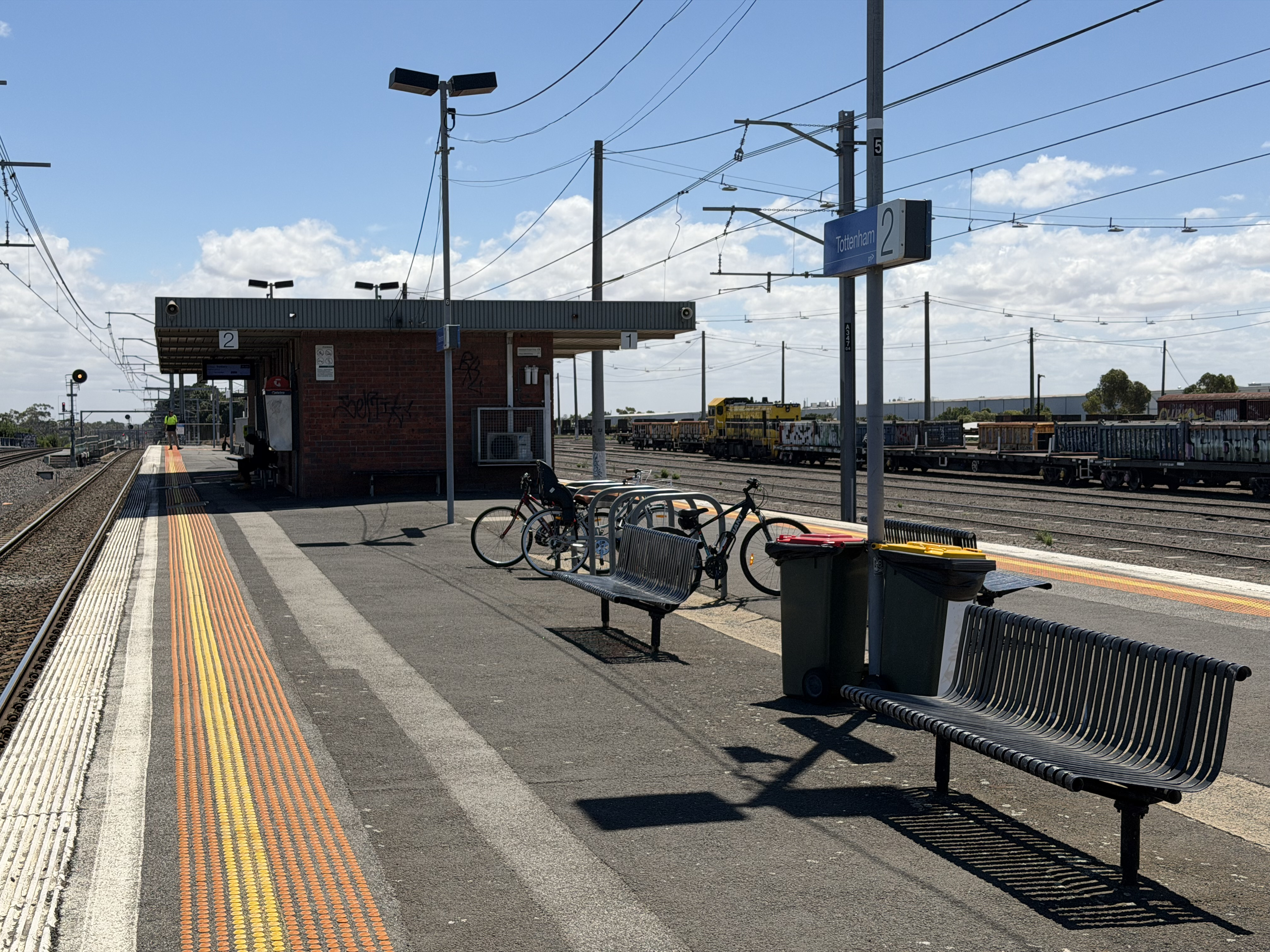
- Westbound view from Platform 2 in January 2026

General information
- Location: Sunshine Road, West Footscray, Victoria 3012; City of Maribyrnong; Australia
- Coordinates: 37°47′57″S 144°51′48″E
- System: PTV commuter rail station
- Owner: VicTrack
- Operator: Metro Trains
- Line: Sunbury
- Distance: 9.10 kilometres from Southern Cross
- Platforms: 2 (1 island)
- Tracks: 4

Construction
- Structure type: Elevated
- Parking: Yes
- Cycle facilities: Yes
- Accessible: No—steep ramp

Other information
- Status: Operational, unstaffed
- Station code: TOT
- Fare zone: Myki zone 1
- Website: Public Transport Victoria

History
- Opened: 2 March 1891; 135 years ago
- Rebuilt: 27 July 1982
- Electrified: October 1921 (1500 V DC overhead)

Passengers
- 2005–2006: 257,431
- 2006–2007: 302,383 ▲17.46%
- 2007–2008: 373,341 ▲23.46%
- 2008–2009: 469,777 ▲25.83%
- 2009–2010: 468,401 ▼0.29%
- 2010–2011: 491,280 ▲4.88%
- 2011–2012: 432,533 ▼11.95%
- 2012–2013: Not measured
- 2013–2014: 409,177 ▼5.39%
- 2014–2015: 501,084 ▲22.46%
- 2015–2016: 580,975 ▲15.94%
- 2016–2017: 619,469 ▲6.62%
- 2017–2018: 631,883 ▲2%
- 2018–2019: 613,100 ▼2.97%
- 2019–2020: 442,450 ▼27.83%
- 2020–2021: 190,650 ▼56.91%
- 2021–2022: 232,450 ▲21.92%

Services
Preceding station	Metro Trains	Following station
West Footscray towards Cranbourne or East Pakenham via Metro Tunnel	Sunbury line	Sunshine towards Watergardens or Sunbury
Track layout
Location

Tottenham station is a railway station operated by Metro Trains Melbourne on the Sunbury line, part of the Melbourne rail network. It serves the western suburb of West Footscray, in Melbourne, Victoria, Australia. It was opened on 2 March 1891, with the current station being provided in 1982.

The station is located on the Ashley Street rail overpass, which provides station access. Tottenham Yard runs north of the station. A number of freight-only lines also operate alongside, as well as the Melbourne – Sydney and Melbourne – Adelaide standard gauge lines. The Regional Rail Link lines run on the south side of the station.

== History ==
Tottenham station, as with the adjacent suburb, was named after Tottenham in Middlesex, England.

During 1981–1982, the ground-level station was rebuilt as part of the scheme to eliminate the Ashley Street level crossing. The new station was an island platform on a rail overpass, involving an extension of the existing two-lane road tunnel under the freight yards. The new up line was opened on 19 May 1981, and the down line and island platform opened on 27 July 1982. At the same time, the signal box was demolished, and a number of signal posts and a crossover were abolished; and White City station, which used to be located between Tottenham and Sunshine, was closed to all traffic and demolished.

In 2014, the station underwent minor upgrades as part of the Regional Rail Link (RRL) project. The most significant of those was the further extension of the bridge over Ashley Street, to accommodate the new RRL tracks. The façade facing Sunshine Road was also upgraded, and a new car park and "park and ride" facilities were added. A power substation was also built on Sunshine Road, just beyond the car park.

== Redevelopment ==
In 2026, the Victorian government announced that the station would be redeveloped as part of the Melbourne Airport Rail project. The Sunbury line will be diverted onto a new pair of tracks between Sunshine and West Footscray stations, allowing the existing track pair to be used by trains to Melbourne Airport and Melton.

As part of this Melbourne Airport Rail project upgrade, Tottenham station will be rebuilt, receiving upgraded lighting, a new dedicated pedestrian underpass, and a new accessible island platform on the new Sunbury line track pair replacing the existing platform.

In May 2026, Melbourne Airport Rail preliminary works began at Tottenham station.

== Platforms and services ==
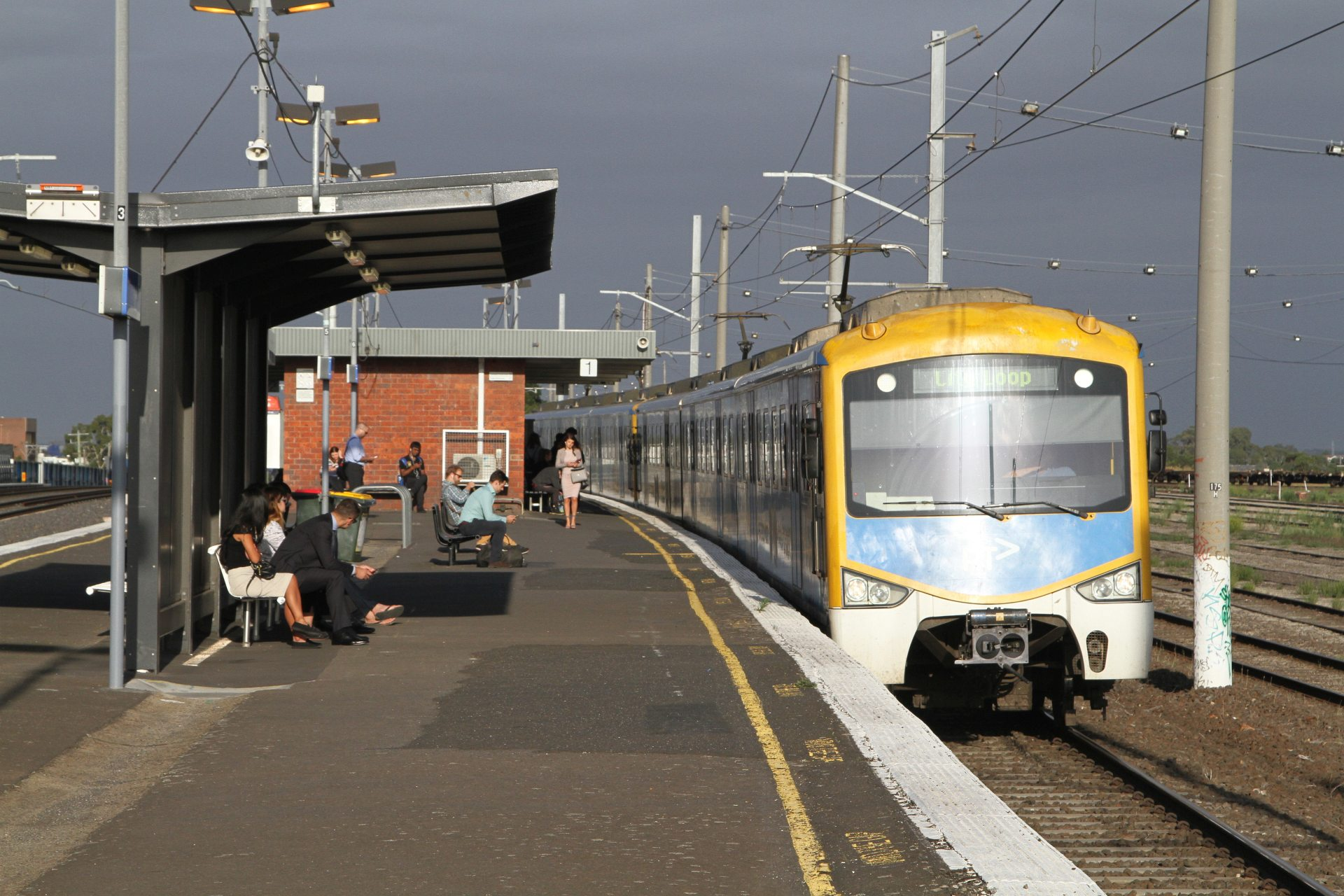
A Siemens Nexas train on a Flinders Street via City Loop service arrives at Platform 1, February 2017

Tottenham has one island platform with two faces and is served by Sunbury line trains. A number of express services do not stop at Tottenham.

=== Current ===
Tottenham platform arrangement
Platform	Line	Destination	Via	Service Type	Notes	Source
1	Sunbury line	Westall, Dandenong, East Pakenham, Cranbourne	Town Hall	All stations and limited express services	Services to Westall and Dandenong only operate during weekday peaks.	
2	Sunbury line	Watergardens, Sunbury		All stations		

== See also ==
- Tottenham Hale station
