= CSR Refinery, New Farm =

CSR Refinery
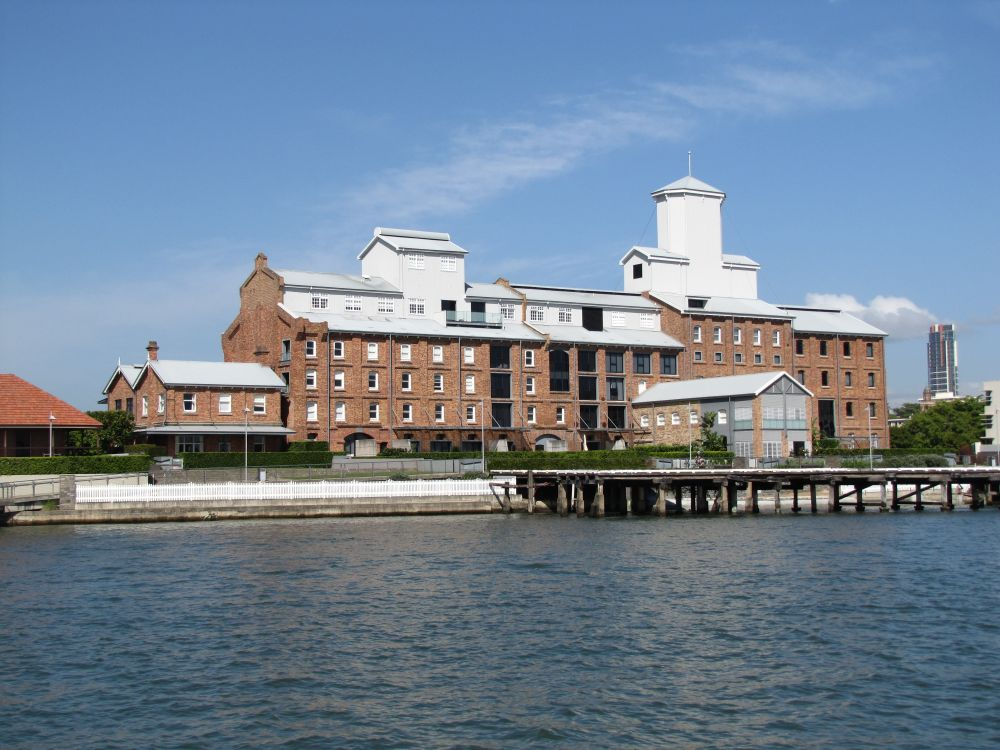
- Former CSR Refinery, 2011

- Location within Queensland Location within Australia
- 27.4657°S 153.0524°E
- Location: Lamington Street, New Farm, City of Brisbane, Queensland, Australia

History
- Design period: 1870s–1890s (late 19th century)
- Built: 1892–1893
- Built for: Colonial Sugar Refining Company

Queensland Heritage Register
- Official name: CSR Refinery (former), Colonial Sugar Refining Company Refinery, New Farm
- Type: state heritage (built)
- Designated: 21 October 1992
- Reference no.: 600261
- Significant period: 1892–1980s (fabric); 1893–1998 (historical)
- Significant components: fence/wall – perimeter, boiler room/boiler house, railway, office/administration building, trees/plantings, drainage, workshop, wall/s – retaining, wharf/dock/quay, factory building, laboratory, canteen, store/s / storeroom / storehouse

CSR Refinery is a heritage-listed former refinery at Lamington Street, New Farm, City of Brisbane, Queensland, Australia. It was built from 1892 to 1893. It is also known as Colonial Sugar Refining Company Refinery of New Farm. It was added to the Queensland Heritage Register on 21 October 1992.

== History ==
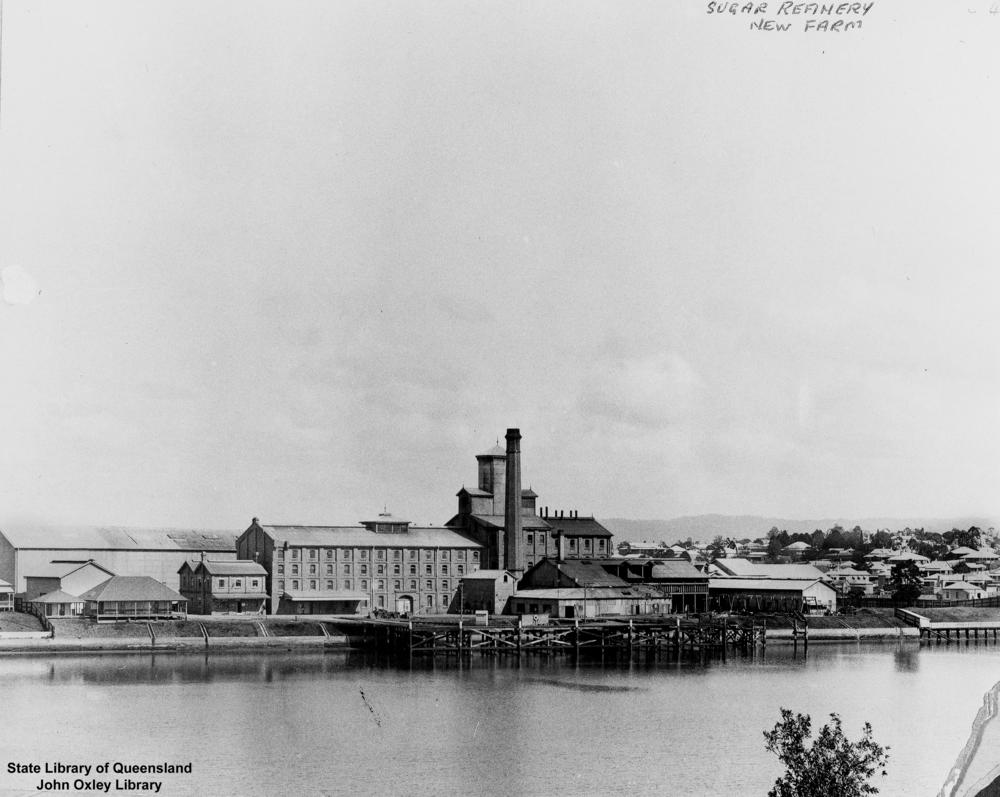
Colonial Sugar Refinery, circa 1902

The CSR Refinery at New Farm was erected by the Colonial Sugar Refinery Company in 1892–1893. Founded in Sydney in 1855, the Colonial Sugar Refining Company (now CSR Limited) has come to dominate the Australian sugar industry, its very name synonymous with sugar.

The 19th century was a time of enormous change in the history of sugar which was to fuel the growth of companies such as CSR and the development of sugar as a new industry in places with suitable growing conditions such as Queensland. The technological advances in the refining process at this time transformed sugar from a luxury item to a staple food and saw a corresponding dramatic increase in the consumption of sugar in western countries.

Attempts at growing sugar cane had been made in Queensland prior to separation, however it was Captain Louis Hope's success in the 1860s which saw government encouragement of the growing of sugar cane in the colony. Plantations developed in the Cleveland, Beenleigh, and Caboolture districts and new areas along the coast quickly opened up including by the 1870s in the Maryborough, Bundaberg, and Mackay districts with sugar refining beginning on a small scale with the opening of the Yengarie sugar mill near Maryborough in 1873 and later the Millaquin refinery at Bundaberg in 1882. By 1874, Queensland was exporting sugar to other Australian colonies. By the 1880s sugar was being grown further north in the Burdekin River, Herbert River, and Cairns districts. Moreover, encouraged by Queensland Premier Thomas McIlwraith, southern capital and advanced technology was beginning to reach northern plantations. The most important of these southern companies was the Colonial Sugar Refining Company who acquired large tracts of land for the cultivation of sugar in the Mackay district and established 3 large mills in North Queensland.

From the 1860s-1880s, Queensland's sugar industry was dominated by plantations owned by companies or wealthy individuals who usually cultivated large areas of cane and operated their own mills; Pacific Islanders comprised the majority of the workforce. By the 1890s, encouraged by government policy (including the promotion of small land holdings, the encouragement of the establishment of central mills owned by small producers, and moves to exclude the use of Pacific Islander labour) the plantation system was no longer dominant; the industry was increasingly characterised by a division between the growing of the cane by small land owners and the milling and refining by large planters or companies. This change was typified by CSR who reorganised their interests to concentrate more on the value adding end of the market i.e. milling and refining.

CSR's Brisbane refinery was the fourth in a chain of refineries established by the company in Australia's capital cities in the late 19th century; refineries were opened in Sydney (Pyrmont 1878 which became the largest in Australia), Melbourne (Yarraville; purchased c. 1875), and Adelaide (Glanville 1891). A refinery in Perth was added in 1930 to complete the chain. According to company records the establishment of the Brisbane refinery was closely linked to the imposition of prohibitive duties on sugar products (in particular recent increases in taxes on syrup and molasses) which would have substantially compromised CSR's share in the golden syrup market in Queensland. The establishment of a local refinery had the added benefit of enabling the company to compete in the refined sugar markets (which were also protected by colonial taxes) in Australia's fourth most populous city.

In 1892 CSR acquired a site beside the Brisbane River of nearly 3 acres (1.2 ha) on the New Farm peninsular by buying up allotments on the recently subdivided Kingsholme estate. The location had two major advantages: it enabled access for large ships and was also close to the city (and it markets). Construction was supervised by local architects John Hall & Sons and interrupted by the 1893 flood but was completed later that year. The new complex consisted of the refinery building comprising char house, cistern house, pan house and refined sugar store; raw sugar store; melt house; boiler house; workshop; a two storied building containing offices, laboratory, and hessian rooms; and the wharf. The original machinery was made in Scotland or came from the other refineries. The complex was designed by James Muir, the manager of the Pyrmont refinery, who had designed all of the other refineries in Australia. He reputedly modelled New Farm on the Glanville plant (demolished c. 1991).

Built during a time of economic depression, this development was seen as a sign of optimism and an impetus for economic growth in Queensland, and in particular as an impetus for sugar growing in the colony. In New Farm, although some industry was already clustered around the river, it was the CSR refinery which provided the catalyst for the development of the Bulimba Reach of the river as a major industrial and warehousing district: the construction of the Bulimba Branch railway line (completed in 1897) being undertaken at the request of CSR who immediately extended the branch line as a siding to the refinery. Later development of the area to benefit from the availability of both wharfage and rail facilities included the woolstores (the first being erected in 1909) and the New Farm Power House (1928).

The site has grown in several stages over the past century, adapting to new technology and increasing the refinery's capacity. The first major stage of development from 1893–1910 saw production increased by more than double. Changes to the site included the building of the railway siding as an extension of the Bulimba branch railway and the purchase of additional lands in the late 1890s (including the site of the residence The Hollins which became the manager's residence). To consolidate the land, the company applied for closure of a section of Sydney Street which was then purchased. Additions were made to the raw sugar store; syrup producing facilities were installed, and the hessian store, jelly house, and tea room for senior staff (known as the Brown Room 1901) were erected.

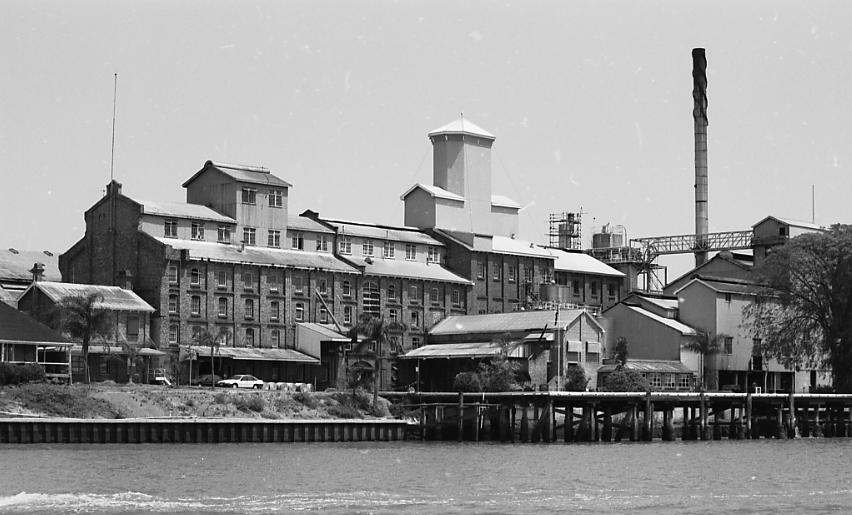
CSR Refinery, 1991

In the thirty years until 1940, the refinery experienced modest growth. The most significant changes were associated with the extension of the raw sugar store involving extending the store beyond the boundaries of the existing site and a realignment of the railway line and Lamington Street. The third stage of the development of the refinery was directly related to World War II which saw output almost doubled in response to a combination of government policies for reserving essential commodities such as sugar and the upgrading of equipment including the introduction of carbonation. The fourth period from 1945–70 was characterised by steady growth. Bulk handling was introduced during this time; other changes included the building of the canteen (1952), extension to the raw sugar store (1960) and a new refined sugar warehouse (1961). From the 1960s sugar arrived by rail or road (rather than by ship). From 1970–1990 works included extensions to the raw sugar store (1973), extensions to the refined sugar store (late 1970s); in 1988, the residence The Hollins was removed from the site; in 1989 the rail link to the refinery was closed. In 1993, the refinery celebrated its centenary: the marking of that event included an open day for the local New Farm community and the publication of a booklet which (importantly) documents some of the social history of the refinery including stories of workers, for whom it was not uncommon to have links with the refinery spanning several generations.

The twentieth century saw sugar develop as one of Queensland's major industries and one of its largest rural commodities. Its growth during this time has been promoted by government policy (both state and federal): the industry being heavily protected and regulated. More recently however tariff levels have been reduced and a number of other structural changes have occurred in the government regulation of the industry. Of the CSR capital city refineries, Pyrmont (substantially demolished 1997/8), Glanville (demolished 1991), and Perth are no longer in use with CSR operating a new super refinery at Mackay. Locally, under the auspices of the Brisbane City Council's Urban Renewal Taskforce, industry was increasingly being encouraged to relocate from innercity New Farm. Against this background, CSR scheduled the New Farm refinery to cease operations from 1998 after which it was used as storage facility. The CSR Refinery at New Farm remained as one of the last surviving of Australia's 19th century sugar refineries.

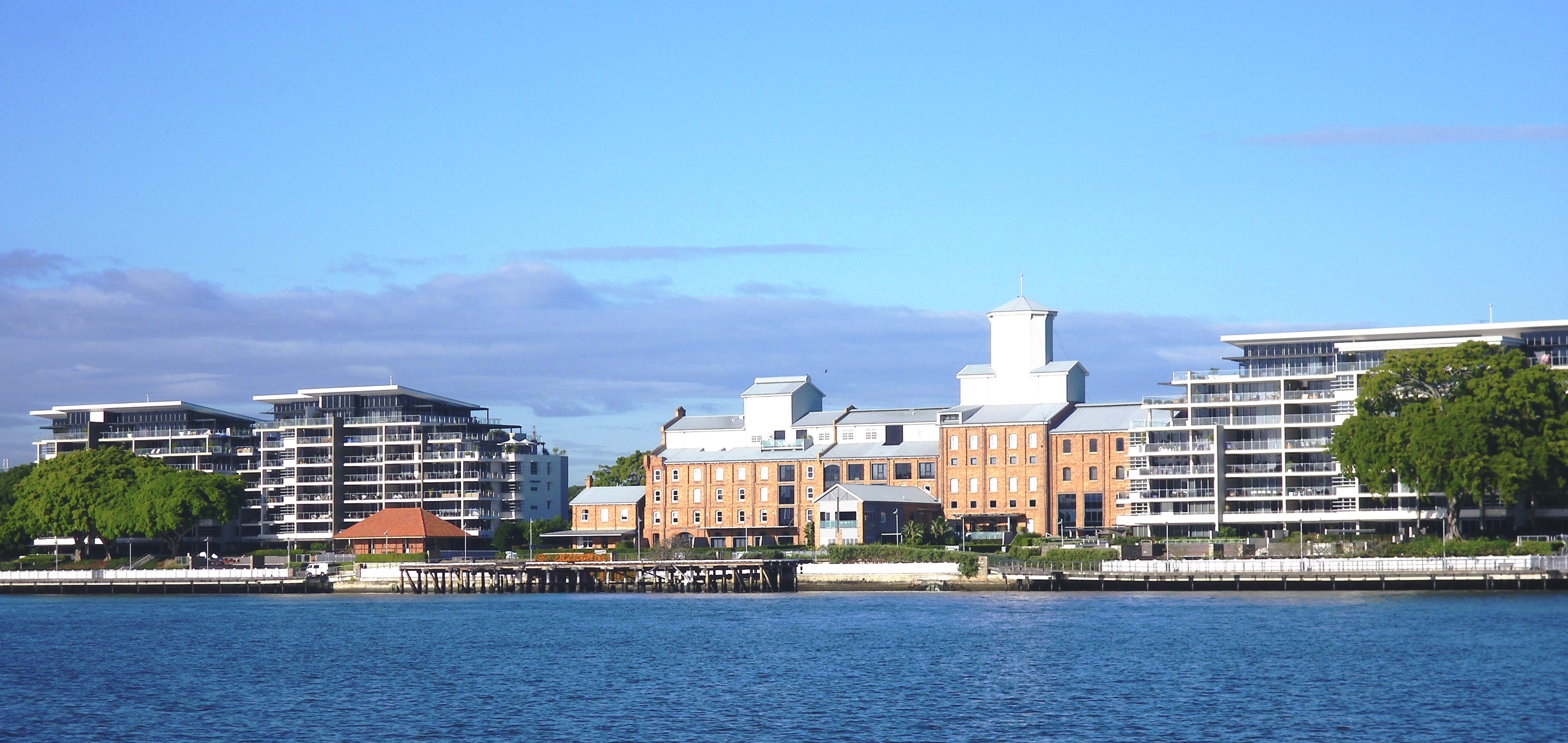
Cutters Landing apartments with the sugar refinery as its centrepiece, 2010

In 2000, CSR sold the site to Mirvac which worked with the Queensland Heritage Council and the Urban Renewal Taskforce to develop a plan that respected the heritage of the site. The former refinery was converted into loft-style apartments as the centrepiece of the $250 million Cutters Landing residential precinct. The 1901 workers’ recreation room has been converted to be a gym and the sections of the wharf and the railway line are incorporated into the public spaces.

== Description ==
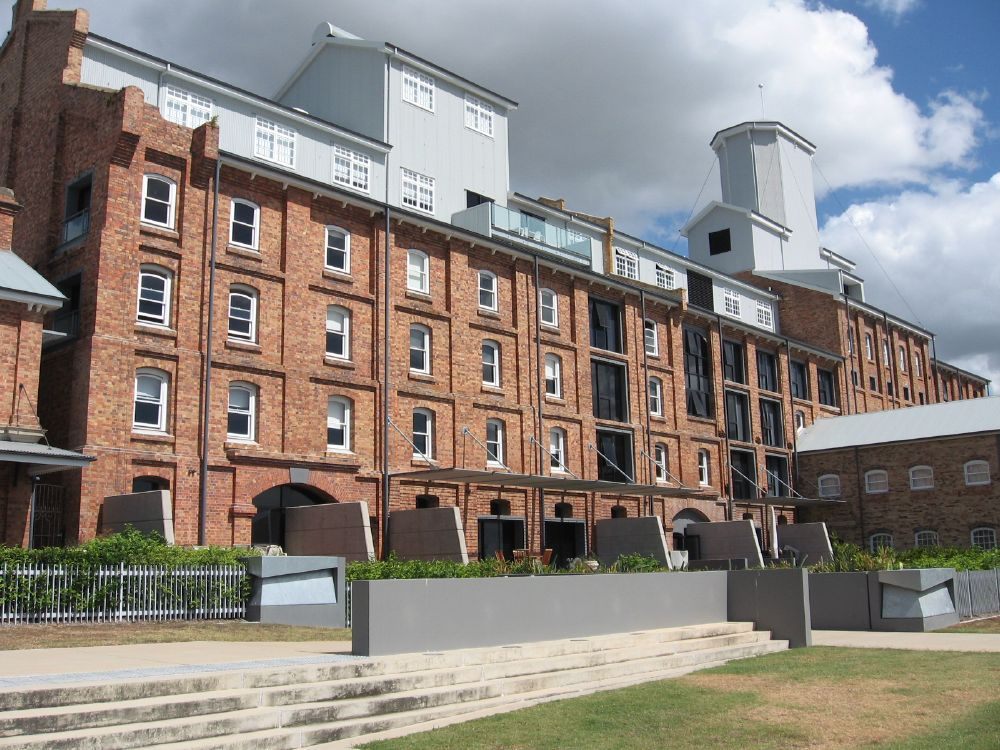
Former CSR Refinery, 2007

The CSR site is bounded by the Brisbane river on the eastern side, Power Station Park on the southern side, Lamington Street on the western side and the site of the private residence, Amity on the northern side. The site forms an integral part of the riverfront landscape of industrial elements and is flanked by the New Farm Power Station to the south and extant wharves and woolstores group (a number of which are entered in the Heritage Register) to the north at Teneriffe.

Although the main entrance is now from Lamington Street, the earlier parts of the site address the river. The original core of buildings are centrally located on the site, with a wharf in front of them. A quadrangle is formed in front of the main building by the arrangement of adjacent structures including the brown room, the laboratory and the wharf. Directly behind the central core is the raw sugar store, flanked by warehouses on the southern side and ancillary buildings and the former site of the residence, the Hollins on the northern side. Most structures have been modified in some manner and additional buildings have been constructed at various periods.

There are a number of mature and semi-mature trees, including Moreton Bay figs, poincianas, frangipanis, mango and palm trees. These are dispersed throughout the site, between buildings, along the river's edge and on the former site of the residence, the Hollins.

Due to the large number of structures on the site, it is necessary to describe them individually. Following is a description of each, in chronological order.

=== Main Building (1893) ===
The main building is a long narrow structure centrally located on the eastern side of the site, addressing the river. It is constructed of load bearing masonry walls composed of face bricks laid in English bond, around a combination of timber and cast iron framework. It is four storeys high at the southern end and five storeys at the northern end with an additional level extending above the southern roof line which is sheeted in corrugated iron.

The brick section comprises a repetitive arrangement of bays divided by engaged pilasters and is divided into the refined sugar store and pan house at the southern end, and the cistern and char house at the northern end. An externally visible brick fire wall divides the building into five and eight bays, between the refined sugar store and the pan house. Twelve-paned arched windows with metal frames are located in each bay on each floor, apart from where modifications have been made.

The repetitive quality of the front elevation, which addresses the river to the east, is interrupted by a series of green tinted pivoting windows which are located on the third and fourth levels, immediately north of the fire wall. Below these windows, and at the southern end of the building are large arched openings, the latter of which aligns with a similar opening at the rear. A corrugated iron awning is suspended above the entrance and extends from the second to the sixth bay, where it steps to above the first floor level. It is tied back to the building and has a valance of timber vertical boards with a scalloped edge.

The southern end facade is void of fenestration, with four engaged pilasters dividing the space vertically. The central section comprises a gable end which has been extended to accommodate the extension at roof level.

The additional level is set back from the roof line and is single storeyed with a two storeyed section in the centre. It has a corrugated iron gable roof with a ventilated ridge. Windows are similar to those in the brick section, except with flat headers rather than arched. The remainder of the original roof is clad in corrugated iron, with eaves supported by decorative brackets.

The northern end of the building is five storeys high. Rising above the roof level is a hexagonal shaped tower, originally used for the storage of char, with single storey gable roofed structures on either side, clad in corrugated iron. The tower roof has coved eaves and decorative brackets, and has a decorative finial at its peak.

The rear of the building has been substantially modified to accommodate new equipment. This includes additions on various levels, the removal of windows in some areas and new openings in others. A number of pieces of equipment are located in this area and some of the extensions connect the main building to the raw sugar store.

Internally many modifications have been made resulting in alterations to the floor levels in some areas, most notably in the char house at the northern end where all floors have been removed, creating a five-storey vertical void with a diagonal walkway at the uppermost level. The framing in the southern end (refined sugar store and pan house) is timber, whilst that in the northern end (cistern and char house) is of cast iron.

The roof space in the cistern house incorporates a funnel-like structure which is constructed of substantial timber elements. The ceilings in most other areas are clad with ripple iron, some of which is concealed by suspended ceiling tiles.

Machinery associated with the sugar refining process is located in all areas, however most has been updated since the establishment of the refinery, with few of the earliest items surviving.

=== The Office (1893) ===
Constructed at the same time as the main building, and located on the south side also addressing the river, the office is a two storeyed structure of face brick laid in English bond. It has a double gabled roof of corrugated iron, with decorative barge boards and a chimney at each end of the front gable. The eaves are supported by a series of decorative brackets.

The front facade is symmetrically composed with three windows with metal sunshades on the first floor and three windows on the ground floor. All windows have new aluminium frames and the central window at ground level was formerly a door. An awning is suspended above the ground level which extends across the eastern facade and wraps half way around the southern end.

A later constructed brick stairwell is located at the southern end of the building. It is stepped back from the front facade and only intrudes into the original building fabric where entrances connect the two structures on both floors.

Internally, the building has been substantially altered to accommodate administration services for the site. It comprises a number of offices divided by plasterboard and glass partitions.

=== Raw Sugar Store (1893, late 1890s, 1924, 1950s/60s & 1970s/80s) ===
The raw sugar store is the largest structure on the site. The original section was constructed in 1893 and has been extended considerably in a number of stages. This building consists internally of one immense open space, and is used to store raw sugar which is pumped into the northern end of the building.

It is an irregularly shaped structure and additions are discernible in variations in the construction and fabric. The original section comprises corrugated iron walls and roof on a concrete base and is located directly to the west of the main building and parallel to it. The next stage was constructed at the southern end of this section. Later additions were erected on the north western side, causing the site to be extended. The largest addition faces Lamington Street and comprises concrete walls with a sloping corrugated iron roof. This abuts a taller gable roofed section in the centre, clad in corrugated iron. Large openings at the southern and northern ends of the building allow for machinery access.

=== Workshops (1893 & 1920) ===
The workshops are sited behind the amenities/canteen block, to the north of the main building. The first section of this building was constructed in 1893 and now makes up the southern portion of the workshop building. It is a corrugated iron clad structure of which the rear section is approximately half a storey higher than the front section. A ventilated ridge runs the length of both sections of the gabled roof and various types of window and door openings are located on the southern side. A single storey structure with a skillion roof is located at the rear of the building.

The northern side of the workshop building was constructed at a later date and is noticeably different in that it has a sawtooth roof. This building and the front of both buildings are surrounded by a brick envelope with a flat topped parapet, of which the uppermost section is rendered. Horizontal louvre windows are located in the central section of the southern and eastern elevations. They are defined as a group by a continuous rendered hood which projects over the windows, rendered sills and by the brickwork in which they are contained, which projects slightly from the main plane of the building.

Internally the area is a large open space, with smaller spaces partitioned off to provide offices. However it is discernibly two different buildings, evident by the differences in roof structure.

=== Boiler House (1893, 1950s/60s & 1970s/80s) ===
Originally constructed in 1893, the boiler house has been extended a number of times. It is located on the eastern side of the main building and now comprises four sections which vary in height, all of which are clad in Colorbond Trimdek. The earliest sections are those on the southern side which have gabled corrugated iron roofs with ventilated ridges.

A circular tapered metal chimney projects above the site at the rear of this building.

=== The Wharf (1893 & c. 1976) ===
Located over the river in the front of the main building, this structure has been renewed a number of times, although its configuration has remained the same. Located in front of the main building, it comprises a U-shaped concrete pad with access ramps at either end, supported by a series of piles encased in concrete. A low white painted timber rail is located at the perimeter of the structure.

=== Laboratory (late 1890s & early 1920s) ===
Abutting the front of the main building and extending to the east is a two storeyed building of brick construction with an awning to the southern elevation. Together with other structures it encloses a quadrangle in front of the main building. The laboratory building has been constructed in two phases, evident in differences in the brickwork and window forms. Entrance to the upper floor is via a later constructed external brick stair at the eastern end of the southern side of the building. The awning is supported by circular steel posts and has a small valance similar to that on the awning on the main building. A valance of the same design decorates the awning over the entrance stairs.

Internally, this building has been substantially modified and comprises a series of rooms divided by plasterboard and glass partitions.

=== Syrup Store (late 1890s & 1920s) ===
Located on the southern side of the office, this building was constructed in two stages and comprises a double gabled structure supported on brick piers. The southern and eastern facades are of metal cladding, whilst the northern and western facades are of brick construction. The building is divided into two separate rooms by a central wall running east–west and has a corrugated iron roof. The room on the southern side has a concrete floor and is entered at ground level, whilst the room on the northern side has a timber floor and is entered via a small flight of stairs on the north-eastern corner.

=== Boilermaker's Shop (c. 1900) ===
Located at the rear of the workshops and to the north of the main building, this building is a single storeyed gable roofed structure clad in corrugated iron. The internal space is open with exposed beams and trusses.

=== Lime House (c. 1900 & 1920s) ===
Constructed after the initial establishment of the refinery, the lime house is a small structure at the northern end of the site. It is two storeyed at the western end and single storeyed at the eastern end. Both sections are clad in colorbond Trimdeck and have corrugated iron gabled roofs.

=== The Brown Room (1901) ===
The Brown Room is located at the south-eastern point of the quadrangle space, on an embankment fronting the river. It is a single storeyed brown painted timber structure, surrounded by verandahs on three sides. It has a hipped terracotta tiled roof, is of single skin construction and elevated on low stumps. The verandah has posts with moulded collars and a handrail, but no balustrading. All external bracing and verandah posts are detailed with stop chamfers which are picked out in a lighter shade of brown. French doors open on to the verandah from each room.

Internally, the building comprises a large room with two smaller rooms at the southern end. The ceiling is horizontal in the centre and follows the slope of the roof line at the sides. It is supported by a series of timber trusses from which contemporary light fittings and fans are suspended, and is lined with ripple iron. The walls are of vertical tongue and groove boards.

=== Amenities/Canteen Block (1952) ===
With a similar intended function as the Brown Room, this building is also located on the river's edge, but to the north of the main building. It is a simple two storeyed rectangular structure, constructed of brick with a hipped terracotta tile roof. Verandahs are located on the first floor on the western and eastern sides, overhanging the ground level. The roof line extends over the verandahs and has ventilated eaves. Both verandahs are enclosed with a solid brick base and horizontal glass louvres on the southern end, and open with a simple balustrade of circular metal posts and rails on the northern end. The building is divided horizontally by a rendered section which runs at the level of the first floor.

The ground floor has a series of small windows which are located directly below the rendered section, whilst the first floor elevations incorporate large glazed sections. These take the form of louvres, double hung windows, and French doors, the latter two of which are divided into a series of uniform horizontal panes. All sets of French doors are flanked by fixed side panels, also with horizontal mullions and panes.

The ground floor is divided into a number of sections to accommodate the first aid room, change rooms and toilets. Access to the first floor is via an internal stair on the western side which opens into a large open space. A canteen is located at the northern end of the first floor and comprises a service counter, behind which is an open kitchen.

The flooring on the upper level is of narrow hardwood floorboards which are highly polished, and the ceiling is of sheet lining with pressed metal ventilators running the length of the space on either side.

=== Recent Buildings (1950s/60s & 1970s/80s) ===
Two large warehouses are located on the southern end of the site. They are constructed of brick with corrugated iron cladding to the upper walls, awnings and roofs, supported by metal framework. Other recent buildings on the site include smaller ancillary structures at the northern end, and a guard house at the entrance, all of which are primarily constructed of brick and corrugated iron.

=== The Fence (early 1920s - late 1950s) ===
A white-painted picket fence is located along the river side of the property. It sits above a concrete and stone retaining wall and runs the entire length of the property apart from a small section between the canteen building and the Hollins site. It adjoins a similar fence which is located in front of the private residence, Amity.

=== Landscape Elements ===
Many mature and semi-mature trees are located throughout the site, softening the effect of the industrial site. The vegetation is particularly noticeable from the eastern side of the river, from where it obscures the buildings on each end of the site.

Other landscape elements on the site include various stone retaining walls and open drains constructed of brick. Also evident are segments of railway tracks including those laid after the 1924 extension on the western side of the site, as well as segments of the original track within the former Wharf Street area adjacent to Amity.

Mature plantings are also located on the former site of the house known as the Hollins. Although the house has been removed from the site, the grassed platform remains, as well as trees which identify the previous alignment of the house. A tennis court also remains at the rear of the site.

== Heritage listing ==
The former CSR Refinery was listed on the Queensland Heritage Register on 21 October 1992 having satisfied the following criteria.

The place is important in demonstrating the evolution or pattern of Queensland's history.

The CSR Refinery at New Farm is important in demonstrating the development of one of Queensland's major industries (and one of its largest rural commodities) - sugar. Erected 1892–3, the refinery is illustrative of the (government promoted) re-orientation of the sugar industry by the 1890s, the effects of which included the establishment of a system of centralised refineries. CSR's Brisbane refinery was built as a direct response to, and is an important illustration of, the effects of the Queensland Government's protectionist trade policies in the decade prior to Federation.

The CSR Refinery at New Farm is important in demonstrating the development from the 1890s of the Bulimba Reach of the Brisbane River and adjacent New Farm / Teneriffe area as an industrial and warehousing district of Brisbane for which CSR with its successful lobbying for the building of the Bulimba branch railway provided the catalyst.

The place demonstrates rare, uncommon or endangered aspects of Queensland's cultural heritage.

The New Farm refinery is now one of the last surviving 19th century CSR sites in Australia, and is a rare example of an intact late 19th century established sugar refinery with evidence of over 100 years of evolution in the fabric and site layout. The refinery is now however one of the last surviving industrial sites on the inner city reaches of the Brisbane river and one of the last to retain its wharf.

The place has potential to yield information that will contribute to an understanding of Queensland's history.

The refinery has the potential to yield information that will contribute to a greater understanding of the role of the sugar industry in the history of Queensland and the nature of late 19th century industrial complexes. There is also the potential to reveal further information regarding the evolution of the site and its surroundings which may contribute to an understanding of the cultural environment of an industrial site.

The place is important in demonstrating the principal characteristics of a particular class of cultural places.

The site demonstrates the principal characteristics of a large, operational sugar refinery which has evolved over more than a century. These characteristics comprise the composite of buildings, structures and grounds, including the early core of the main refining building, office, laboratory, workshops, raw sugar store and syrup store, ancillary buildings, the transport infrastructure of the wharf and remnant railway alignments, staff amenities including the Brown Room and the Amenities/Canteen Block, and the landscape elements including mature trees, vegetation, open spaces within the grounds, and the spatial relationship of the buildings, structures, grounds, river, wharf, railway alignments and roads. In particular, the main 1893 refining building demonstrates the principal characteristics of a 19th-century industrial building, including use of face bricks, restrained embellishment and a narrow, vertical form and is a rare surviving example of its type in Queensland.

The place is important because of its aesthetic significance.

The place has aesthetic significance and is a dominant landmark both from New Farm, and from the river and the eastern suburbs. Its landmark qualities are a result of a number of contributing factors, including the massing of the buildings and their relationship and orientation to the river and each other, individual sections of buildings such as the highly visible char tower with its decorative brackets and finial, the substantial amount of vegetation on the site and the lineal qualities from the east, as defined by the buildings, grassed banks, fence, wharf and river.

The buildings and the spaces between them contribute to the industrial aesthetic of the place. The main building, the laboratory, the brown room, the wharf, the Amenities/Canteen Block, and the open space bounded by these structures and the river, provides an aesthetic focus. A number of buildings demonstrate a high degree of design and workmanship, including the main building, the office, the Brown Room and the Amenities/Canteen Block.

The considerable amount of vegetation which includes trees at various stages of maturity and the many landscape elements such as stone retaining walls, open brick-lined drains, grassed banks and the picket fence along the river front contribute to the aesthetic qualities of the place. The fence in particular is a dominant feature and gives the site a somewhat residential or parklike appearance. It is of particular significance in that it continues along the frontage to Amity (Amity), an adjacent residence which was used by CSR as a manager's residence from 1950 to 1980.

Similarly the remnant landscaping from the former site of the Hollins, at the northern end is significant both for its contribution to the aesthetic qualities of the place and for its contribution to interpreting the former use of the site.

The place has a strong or special association with a particular community or cultural group for social, cultural or spiritual reasons.

Established over a century ago, the CSR site has strong associations for past and present CSR workers, some of whom have generational links with the place.

The place has a special association with the life or work of a particular person, group or organisation of importance in Queensland's history.

The fourth in a chain of refineries established by the Colonial Sugar Refining Company in Australia's capital cities in the late 19th century, the refinery is also important in demonstrating the company's dominance of both the Queensland and Australian sugar industry for over a century.
