= Bethungra =

Bethungra may refer to:

- Bethungra, New South Wales, a locality in rural New South Wales
  - Bethungra Spiral, the railway spiral near the locality
- Bethungra, Canterbury, a house in the suburb of Canterbury, Sydney in New South Wales
