= CSR (Australian company) =

Australian building products company

CSR Pty Ltd
- CSR logo
- Type: Subsidiary company
- Industry: Building materials
- Founded: 1855; 171 years ago in Sydney, Australia
- Founder: Edward Knox
- Headquarters: North Ryde, Sydney, New South Wales, Australia
- Areas served: Australia; New Zealand; United States
- Key people: Paul Dalton (CEO)
- Products: Plasterboard; bricks; roof tiles; insulation; aluminium
- Services: Wholesale and retail trading
- Revenue: ▲ A$2.32 billion (2019)
- Operating income: ▲ A$265 million (2019)
- Net income: ▲ A$146 million (2021)
- Number of employees: c. 3,000 (2021)
- Parent: Compagnie de Saint-Gobain S.A.
- Website: csr.com.au

CSR Pty Ltd is a major Australian industrial company, producing building products and has a 25% share in the Tomago aluminium smelter located near Newcastle, New South Wales. It is a subsidiary of Compagnie de Saint-Gobain S.A. In 2021, it had over 3,000 employees and reported an after-tax profit of $146 million. The group's corporate headquarters is in North Ryde, Sydney.

Founded in Sydney in 1855 as the Colonial Sugar Refining Company at the Old Sugarmill, the company expanded into milling cane in Queensland and Fiji from the 1870s. It quickly became the most important miller and refiner in Australasia, with a virtual monopoly on Queensland and Fiji sugar production up to, respectively, 1989 and 1972. It also sold by-products of the sugar industry, from molasses to ethanol. In 2010, CSR sold its sugar and ethanol business, which had been given the name Sucrogen in 2009, to the Singaporean company Wilmar. As of 2015, the business is known as Wilmar Sugar and it markets sugar with the CSR brand name.

The company began to diversify into building products as early as 1942, with the construction of a plaster mill in Sydney, and in 1947 the company began manufacturing plasterboard. It acquired Bradford Insulation in 1959, which produced heat insulation materials for buildings, and currently has a substantial share of the insulation market in Australia and Asia. The company also produces fibre cement sheeting, aerated concrete products, bricks, permanent formwork for walls and systems to support plasterboard construction through Rondo, a joint venture with Boral. It spun off its interests in heavy building products to a separate listed company, Rinker Group, in 2003. In 2007, CSR established the Viridian glass company which it sold in 2019.

French multinational Saint-Gobain acquired CSR for A$4.5 billion (US$2.95 billion) in 2024.

== Sugar ==
=== Early sugar refining operations ===
Founded in Sydney by Edward Knox in 1855 as the Colonial Sugar Refining Company, the company first began refining imported raw sugar at its refineries in Canterbury then Chippendale. CSR expanded into the Melbourne market in 1857 with the purchase of a refinery at Sandridge through its associate company, the Victoria Sugar Company. These operations were later moved to refineries at Pyrmont and Yarraville.

=== Expansion into central milling ===
By the late 1860s, relying on imported raw sugar was no longer financially viable for the company and Knox decided to establish his own supplies by establishing centralised mills to crush sugarcane grown by farmers in the Northern Rivers region of New South Wales. Raw sugar produced from the Southgate, Chatsworth, Darkwater and Harwood mills on the Macleay, Clarence and Richmond Rivers was transported by ship to the company's refineries in Sydney and Melbourne. This proved very profitable and CSR was able to retain a near monopoly of sugar refining in the Australian colonies. In 1880-81, CSR further consolidated their milling operations by the construction of the high-output Condong and Broadwater mills also located in northern New South Wales.

=== Queensland and Fiji plantations ===
In 1880, Knox handed over the management of CSR to his second son Edward William Knox who immediately began a rapid expansion of the company's operations into Queensland and Fiji. E.W. Knox oversaw the transition of the company into owning and running large sugar plantations in these regions which were serviced on-site by high capacity mills also owned by CSR.

==== Queensland ====
The Queensland Government passed an Act in 1881 allowing CSR to acquire large amounts of land in the north of the colony and to invest £500,000 in establishing sugar plantations in these areas. The two major CSR plantations created at this time were the Victoria Plantation and the Homebush Plantation. Blackbirded South Sea Islander labour was utilised by CSR to deforest the land, plant and cut the sugarcane, and build the mills. Knox and the company's Queensland director E.B. Forrest chartered blackbirding vessels to bring Islanders to the plantations. The 1884 recruiting voyage of Hopeful blackbirding labour vessel which kidnapped and murdered many Islanders was under contract to deliver labourers to Ebenezer Cowley, manager of the Victoria Plantation. An 1886 inquiry into this type of labour found that up to 60% of the Islanders transported to the Homebush Plantation had died within four years. The kidnapping and deaths of these workers resulted in 111 Islanders being removed from the CSR plantations by the Queensland government and returned to their homelands in 1885. CSR was compensated £4,424 by the government for the loss of these labourers. CSR also experimented with cheap Chinese, Javanese, Singhalese and Japanese coolie labour on their plantations.

By the 1890s, Knox decided to abandon the plantation system in Queensland and return to the central mill method used in its New South Wales operations. CSR subdivided the Victoria and Homebush estates into small farms which it sold or leased to white farmers who would sell their cane to CSR to be processed at its nearby mills.

==== Fiji ====
In 1880, E.W. Knox expanded the company's sugar plantation and milling systems to Fiji with a large estate and mill being established at Nausori. Another estate and mill was constructed at Rarawai in 1886. Cheap Fijian and South Sea Islander labourers were utilised with high mortality rates being recorded. At Nausori, the Agent-General for Immigration in Fiji, described the deaths of the Islander labourers at the CSR plantation as appalling and tantamount to manslaughter. Local laws made it harder to use blackbirded Melanesian labour and CSR soon turned to Indian coolie labour imported from Calcutta. By 1885, most of CSR's Fijian plantation workforce were coolies on 5 year contracts.

=== Later sugar operations ===
CSR constructed further large refineries and mills in Australasia including the Chelsea Sugar Refinery built near Auckland in 1884, a large refining complex at Glanville, Adelaide in 1891 to process sugar from Mauritius, and the massive sugar mill at Lautoka in 1903. In 1923, the Queensland state government signed an agreement with CSR to refine all of that state's sugar production, a monopoly that was to continue until 1989, 16 years after CSR had left Fiji. At that time, about 80% of production was exported.

CSR separated its sugar and energy businesses from its building products business in 2009, which resulted in the creation of Sucrogen as CSR's sugar and energy business. It then operated seven sugar mills in Queensland: Victoria Mill and Macknade Mill in the Herbert River region, centred around the town of Ingham; Invicta Mill, Inkerman Mill, Kalamia Mill and Pioneer Mill in the Burdekin Region; and Plane Creek Mill at Sarina, south of Mackay. CSR also owned a 75% share in the Sugar Australia refineries in Melbourne and Mackay (the other 25% being Mackay Sugar Co-Operative's) and in the Chelsea Sugar Refinery in Auckland. Using the molasses by-product from the sugar mills, the company also distilled ethanol for use in fuel ethanol manufacture, and varying grades of domestic industrial ethanols for food production and other chemical processes. The CSR brand was used on most of the retail sugar products produced. The production made up around 60% of the sugar on the Australian domestic market, and 80% of that in New Zealand.

Sucrogen was sold to Singapore company Wilmar International in 2010.

== Construction and mining ==
In February 1980, CSR acquired construction and mining contractor Thiess in a hostile takeover. In April 1981, the construction division was sold to a consortium of Hochtief, Westfield Group and Leslie Thiess.

== Wittenoom asbestos mine ==
Between 1948 and 1966, CSR operated mines at Wittenoom, Western Australia that produced 161,000 tons of crocidolite fibre. During this time, thousands of workers and their families, visitors, tourists, consultants and government officials were exposed to potentially lethal levels of blue asbestos almost a thousand times higher than occupationally regulated at the time. Many of them would develop fatal diseases due to this, such as pleural mesothelioma and lung cancer.

Despite warnings from the Western Australia Health Department and other health authorities in the early 1960s, CSR continued to operate the mine until 1966. The first court victory for the Wittenoom victims was in 1988, when Klaus Rabenault won his case against Midalco, a subsidiary of CSR that ran the mines. The judge ruled that CSR acted with 'continuing, conscious and contumelious' disregard for its workers' safety and that Rabenault should be awarded $426,000 by way of compensation and $250,000 in punitive damages.

It is predicted that by 2020, almost a third of the people who passed through Wittenoom during the mines' operating years would be diagnosed with a fatal disease caused by their dangerous exposures to blue asbestos. This would be an estimated 2,000 cases totalling costs of A$500 million in damages from CSR.

In the 1980s CSR was pursued by victims of asbestosis caused by the operation of its Midalco subsidiary in Western Australia. By 1988, 258 damage-related suits had been taken against CSR, though only a handful of cases had been heard in the courts. In May that year a Victorian court made an award of A$680,000 against Midalco to a former worker, after he contracted the fatal lung cancer, mesothelioma; and in August, lesser amounts were awarded to other workers, against CSR itself. In 1989 and 1990, a settlement was made.

Meanwhile, CSR and the State Government Insurance Commission of Western Australia were engaged in a dispute as to which of them was responsible for payment of the damages to the workforce and their dependents, with CSR arguing that it was not responsible for liabilities sustained by its Midalco subsidiary. The two bodies finally reached agreement in early 1989 to share the costs of compensation. Fifteen million dollars would be paid out by each of them to cover damages for the seven-year period of operation of the Wittenoom mine, with an additional total of A$20 million payable to claimants who worked there before 1959. By the end of that year, researchers at the Queen Elizabeth II Medical Centre, and the Sir Charles Gairdner Hospital, in Perth had estimated that a further 692 workers would fall victim to mesothelioma with another 183 cases of lung cancer to be expected. They predicted another 432 successful claims would be made, in addition to the 356 already accepted.

At the beginning of 1990, 322 workers had been compensated. A few months later CSR made a partial re-entry into mining, when it bought up 48 quarries from the US ARC subsidiary of the British Hanson corporation. It also pulled out of a plasterboard joint venture with Redland Plasterboard (established in 1987) while retaining its Australian and New Zealand interests, through Monier PGH—a company with around half of the Australian roofing tile market.

The mining and milling of blue asbestos at Wittenoom is as of 2004 the greatest single industrial disaster in Australia's history.

CSR has to date not publicly apologised for its involvement in mining asbestos at Wittenoom.

== See also ==
- Julie Bishop
- Boral
- Chelsea Sugar Refinery
- CSR Refinery, Yarraville
- Edward Knox
- Rinker Group
