= Old Sugarmill =

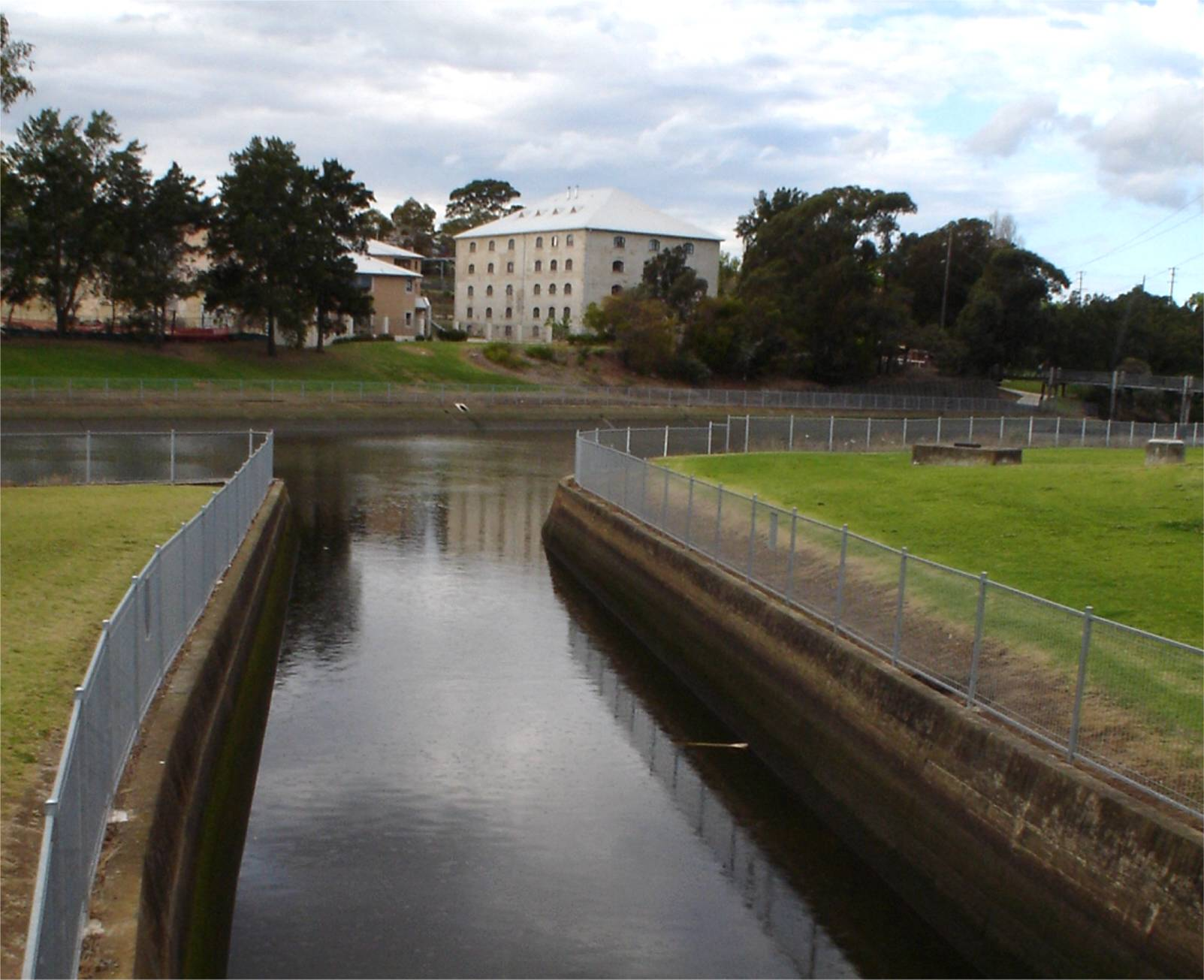
- Old Sugarmill viewed from across Cooks River

- Location within Sydney Location within Australia
- 33°54′50″S 151°07′18″E
- Location: Sugar House Road, Canterbury, City of Canterbury-Bankstown, New South Wales, Australia

History
- Built: 1839–1841

Site notes
- Architect: Woodhouse Danks

New South Wales Heritage Register
- Official name: Old Sugarmill; Canterbury Sugar Works; Former Hutton Premises; Australian Sugar Company Mill; Canterbury Sugar House; ASC Sugar Mill Buildings; Australasian Sugar Company
- Type: state heritage (built)
- Designated: 2 April 1999
- Reference no.: 290
- Type: Sugar Mill
- Category: Manufacturing and Processing

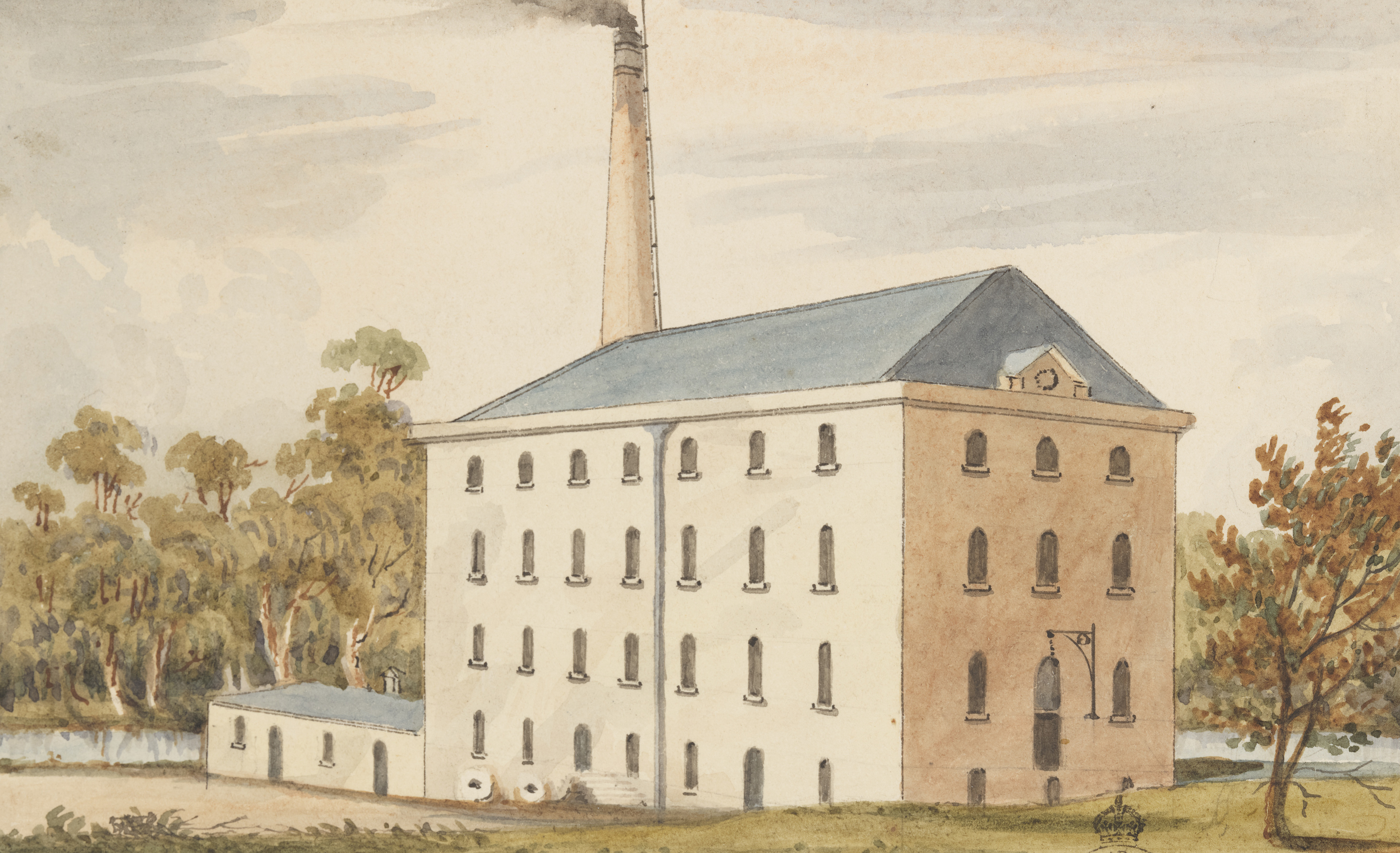
Sugar Works at Canterbury, Sydney, 1840-1850

The Old Sugarmill is a heritage-listed former sugar mill and now apartments at Sugar House Road, Canterbury in the City of Canterbury-Bankstown local government area of New South Wales, Australia. It was designed by Woodhouse Danks and built from 1839 to 1841. It is also known as Canterbury Sugar Works, Former Hutton Premises, Australian Sugar Company Mill, Canterbury Sugar House, ASC Sugar Mill Buildings and Australasian Sugar Company. It was added to the New South Wales State Heritage Register on 2 April 1999.

== History ==
=== Aboriginal history ===
Canterbury is located within the traditional boundaries of the Eora nation, on land occupied variously by Wangal, Bidgigal and Kameygal people. There are remnant middens in the vicinity, and also a surviving rock painting site featuring hand stencils which is located on the south side of the river in Earlwood that is listed on the New South Wales State Heritage Register (no.1801).

=== Colonial history ===
European exploration of the Cooks River commenced with the colonisation of Sydney in 1788, when "officers of the First Fleet of 1788 negotiated the Cooks River as far as the districts of present-day Canterbury and Campsie. The officers noted the low and marshy aspect of the countryside and observed Aborigines fishing on the river"

The earliest European settlement in the area took place when the Rev. Richard Johnson was granted 40 hectares (100 acres), known as "Canterbury Vale" on 28 May 1793. Canterbury Vale was consolidated by a grant of 20 hectares (50 acres) on 15 September 1796 and a further grant of 260 cares on 5 October 1799. This was known as Sheep Pasture Plains. Johnson applied for leave to return to England for health reasons in 1798 and before his departure in October 1800 sold the farm to Lieutenant William Cox. Cox was a lieutenant in the new South Wales Corps but in 1803 was suspended from office due to overstraining his credit. Cox had purchased additional properties surrounding Canterbury Vale. In 1803 Robert Campbell procured 340 hectares (830 acres) of Cox's land consolidating a grant of land which he already held.

Campbell was known as the "father of the mercantile community" in the colony of New South Wales. The main purpose of the purchase at Canterbury seems to have been for the accommodation of the overflow of imported cattle rejected by the government which he apparently purchased.

During the latter part of the 1830s the colony was enjoying an economic boom with much English capital flowing into the country. A London-based company promoter, Francis Kemble, who had some previous experience in the sugar industry, persuaded William Knox Child, Deputy Lieutenant of the County of Kent and also inspector and director of the London and County Joint stock Bank to provide the capital for the establishment of a sugar works in Australia. In 1839 the Australian Sugar Company (ASC) was formed in London, purchase made of machinery and equipment after the sale of Child's assets, and on 11 March 1840 the directors of ASC and their families and forty operatives departed for Sydney, arriving on 12 July 1840.

Because of the need for plentiful water and fuel supplies to expedite the manufacturer of sugar, a site on the Cooks River was chosen on part of Robert Campbell's Canterbury estate. As well, a dam had been erected near the site to prevent salt water reaching the upper portion of the stream - town supply was limited and this was the nearest available location close to Sydney. Some 24 hectares (60 acres) were chosen with a value of A£1,200 and the transaction was carried out by the exchange of A£50 shares in the company.

Work commenced on erecting the main building beside the Cooks River. Scottish stonemasons quarried sandstone on the site, to erect the building. Ironbark was obtained from across the river. By September 1841 the Mill was sufficiently complete to warrant a detailed description in The Australian. As a result of disputes between Kemble and Childs, a slump in trade caused the dissolution of the company and the subsequent formation of the Australasian Sugar Company.

Before the Mill began production, sugar was imported into Sydney from Java, Mauritius and the Philippines. The raw material to the Mill was imported from the Philippines. Apart from the cane which arrived in Sydney with the First Fleet, pioneering efforts production of cane was undertaken by T. A. Scott who settled in Australia in 1819 and spent several years growing sugar cane at Port Macquarie. In 1829 he went to Point Clare where he had received a grant of land, and continued to grow cane on a very small scale. It was not until the late 1860s that commercially viable crops were grown in the northern part of new South Wales. It was in the 1860s that cultivation of cane became viable in Queensland. Because of these circumstances the Mill at Canterbury processed imported material.

The Sugar Company and Robert Campbell subdivided their land in 1841 and auctioned it. The nucleus of the Village of Canterbury thus formed on this land subdivided in 1841. The reason for the subdivision was to accommodate Mill workers and secondly to raise finances for the operation of the Mill.

From 1843 to 1846 the Australasian Sugar Company was managed by Edward Knox, a close friend of Campbell. After 1846 he remained a director of the Company until 1854 when disagreements amongst the shareholders caused the dissolution of the concern. On 1 January 1855 the Colonial Sugar Refining Company was formed with Knox as manager and one of the directors. A decision was made to close the works and transfer them to a property in George Street West later that year.

The Mill remained vacant and unused for many years. In 1880 the Sugar Mill was purchased by Frederick Clissold, who in turn sold it to Blacket and Co., Engineer in 1884. Blacket and Co. hoped to benefit from being located next to the promised suburban railway line. However the line was slow to arrive and the company was bankrupted before the line was built.

=== Twentieth-century history ===
It was used as a butter factory by Foley Bros and from 1900 until 1908 by Denham Bros as the Canterbury Bacon Factory. Towards the end of this time the tall chimney, once such a prominent and unique feature of the Sugar Mill was demolished. In 1908 the former Sugar Mill was purchased by the firm J. C. Hutton and Co. The firm used the sugar works for the manufacture of smallgoods. In 1950 the killing licence expired. In 1983 Hutton sold the property to its present owner, Nick Scali and Co. Pty Ltd.

== Description ==
Industrial five-storey mill in Georgian style architecture with a three-storey annex to the eastern side. Roofed with a large single hipped corrugated iron roof. There is a small pediment marked "A.S.C. 1841" marking the original ownership of the building. Since being adaptively restored within a residential complex of 39 units in 2003, the Old Sugarmill is neighboured by another apartment block and a row of townhouses.

=== Modifications and dates ===
- 1803 – Purchase of Canterbury Estate by Robert Campbell
- 1839 – Formation of Australian Sugar Company (ASC) in London
- 1840 – Arrival of ASC directors, operatives and others in Sydney
- 1841 – Mill building substantially complete
- 1842 – Production of sugar at the Mill commences
- 1854 – Dissolution of the Australian Sugar Company
- 1855 – Colonial Sugar Refining Company (CSR) formed and works at Canterbury closed
- c. 1908 – Tall chimney demolished
- 1908–1919 – Caretakers cottage, killing shed and engine room (smokestack) built. Original four floors reduced to two and basement used as cold storage rooms.
- 1985 – Permanent Conservation Order made on Old Sugarmill (transformed into listing on State Heritage Register when Heritage Act amended in 1999).
- 1996 – Ruin of Old Sugarmill is further damaged by fire.
- 2003 – Old Sugarmill adaptively restored into apartment block within residential complex of 39 units.

== Heritage listing ==
As at 27 March 2007, the Old Sugarmill at Canterbury was of State significance for its involvement in the development of the sugar industry and CSR in Australia, and for its role in the industrial development of the locality of Canterbury - both in its original use as a sugar mill and for its later uses as a foundry, a butter factory and in the manufacture of processed foods. A five-storey sandstone building erected beside the Cooks River in 1841, it is believed to be the oldest surviving industrial building in the Sydney region. Statewide it is a rare example of a pre-1850s industrial building which has retained much of its external form. It is also of State aesthetic significance for its landmark appearance on the river and its symmetrical Georgian styling. It has scientific significance for the site's archaeological potential to reveal information about early industry in New South Wales. Although the Old Sugarmill was a ruin for many years and was further damaged by fire in 1996, it has been recently restored and adapted into a new use as an apartment block within a new residential complex.

Old Sugarmill was listed on the New South Wales State Heritage Register on 2 April 1999 having satisfied the following criteria.

The place is important in demonstrating the course, or pattern, of cultural or natural history in New South Wales.

The Old Sugarmill at Canterbury is of State historic significance because of its associations with the development of the sugar industry in Australia, especially with the nationally important company of CSR, and because of its important role in the development of the locality of Canterbury, both in its original use and because of its other uses as a foundry, butter factory and then processed food. It has additional historical significance as the oldest building in Canterbury and its role in the early subdivision and settlement in the locality.

The place is important in demonstrating aesthetic characteristics and/or a high degree of creative or technical achievement in New South Wales.

The Old Sugarmill at Canterbury is of State aesthetic significance as a five-storey sandstone building with symmetrical Georgian styling in a landmark setting beside the Cooks River.

The place has potential to yield information that will contribute to an understanding of the cultural or natural history of New South Wales.

It has scientific significance because the site demonstrates great archaeological potential to reveal information about early occupation and industry in New South Wales and in this locality. Intact equipment and purpose-designed structures from the occupation of J.C. Hutton and Co - demonstrate past techniques relating to food processing and its associated technology.

The place possesses uncommon, rare or endangered aspects of the cultural or natural history of New South Wales.

The Old Sugarmill at Canterbury is of State significance for its rarity, believed to be the oldest surviving industrial building in the Sydney region. Statewide it is a rare example of a pre-1850s industrial building which has retained much of its external form.
