= CSR Refinery, Yarraville =

Sugar refinery in Yarraville, Melbourne, Victoria, Australia

- Complex exterior, 2026

- Location within Melbourne
- Alternative names: CSR Refinery, Yarraville; Colonial Sugar Refining Company Yarraville Refinery; CSR sugar refinery, Yarraville

General information
- Status: Completed
- Type: Sugar refinery
- Architectural style: Edwardian architecture
- Location: 265 Whitehall Street, Yarraville, Melbourne, Victoria, Australia
- Coordinates: 37°49′09″S 144°54′16″E
- Year built: 1872–1980s
- Completed: 1873; 153 years ago (main building)
- Client: Joshua Brothers Company
- Owner: CSR (since 1875), as the Colonial Sugar Refining Company

Technical details
- Material: Bricks, timber, metal frames, bluestone
- Floor count: 10 (main building)
- Floor area: 30 by 15 m (100 by 50 ft)

Design and construction
- Architect: Thomas Watts (1873)
- Main contractor: Edward Murphy; Timothy Lane

Victorian Heritage Register
- Official name: CSR Complex
- Type: Registered place
- Designated: 8 May 1997
- Reference no.: H1311
- Heritage overlay no.: HO75
- Category: Manufacturing and Processing
- Significant components: Boiler room/boiler house; office/administration building; bulk sugar store; raw sugar store; engineering building; wharf

The CSR Refinery, Yarraville is an operating sugar refinery complex at Whitehall Street, Yarraville, an inner-western suburb of Melbourne, in Victoria, Australia. The first structures on the site were completed in 1873 by the Joshua Brothers Company, and, in 1875, the complex the became part of CSR operations. Further structures were developed through until the 1980s.

The complex was added to the Victorian Heritage Register on 8 May 1997 in recognition of its historical, scientific (technical) and architectural importance. The adjacent wharves and the complex were also added to a non-statutory heritage list by the City of Maribyrnong.

== History ==
The sugar refinery at Yarraville was built in 1873 and purchased by the Colonial Sugar Refinery Company from the Joshua Brothers in 1875. Founded in Sydney in 1855, the Colonial Sugar Refining Company (now CSR Limited) came to dominate the sugar industry in Australia and throughout the South Pacific region.

Attempts at growing sugar cane commenced in pre-colonial Queensland, enhanced by Captain Louis Hope's success in the 1860s. Plantations developed in the Cleveland, Beenleigh, and Caboolture districts and new areas along the coast quickly opened up including by the 1870s in the Maryborough, Bundaberg, and Mackay districts with sugar refining beginning on a small scale with the opening of the Yengarie sugar mill near Maryborough in 1873 and later the Millaquin refinery at Bundaberg in 1882. By 1874, Queensland was exporting sugar to other Australian colonies. By the 1880s sugar was being grown further north in the Burdekin River, Herbert River, and Cairns districts. Moreover, encouraged by Queensland Premier Thomas McIlwraith, southern capital and advanced technology was beginning to reach northern plantations. The most important of these southern companies was the Colonial Sugar Refining Company who acquired large tracts of land for the cultivation of sugar in the Mackay district and established 3 large mills in North Queensland.

To serve the growing Australian cities, CSR erected a chain of refineries around Australia's capital cities by the late 19th century, with Melbourne (Yarraville; purchased c. 1875), Sydney (Pyrmont 1878 which became the largest in Australia), Adelaide (Glanville 1891), and Brisbane. The Perth refinery was added in 1930. These dispersed plants were necessary because the refined product would otherwise be contaminated by sea voyages if distributed from the growing areas. CSR's monopoly was defended through the imposition of prohibitive intercolonial import duties on sugar products (in particular increases in taxes on syrup and molasses in the late nineteenth century) which would otherwise have had substantially compromised CSR's share in the golden syrup market in Queensland. The establishment of a local refinery enabled the company to compete in the protected refined sugar markets.

Technological advances in the refining process in the mid-nineteenth century transformed sugar from a luxury item to a staple food and saw a corresponding dramatic increase in the consumption of sugar in western countries. The Colonial Sugar Refinery Company established a number of works around Australia and New Zealand, of which the Melbourne site was the first to be developed on the already established Joshua Brothers Company refinery of 1873, which was constructed to compete with the rival Victoria Sugar Company, a subsidiary of the Colonial Sugar Refining Company. Following a fire at the c. 1857 Victorian Sugar Company refinery, CSR took over the Joshua Bros., and the Yarraville site. Nationally, CSR expanded and had a sugar refining monopoly which continued well into the twentieth century.

== Description ==
The complex comprises buildings dating from three main periods: 1870s, 1900s and 1910s.

The buildings on the site are predominantly brick, timber or metal framed structures; the panhouse is the only structure which uses bluestone. The structures are generally roofed using metal or timber framed trusses clad in galvanised sheeting. The main building is ten storeys high and has a footprint of 30 by 15 metres (100 by 50 ft), constructed to Thomas Watts' design in 1872-73; it is the oldest building on site and exhibits technology from the period. The cistern house and char ends buildings exhibit a complete range of the technologies employed in iron and steel frame construction from the 1870s to the 1930s and house original cisterns and kilns. Of notable significance are the cast iron and masonry elements, completed in the Edwardian style, and the enormous timber trusses and its unique prefabricated structural systems. Other structures were completed in c. 1880 (packing shed), 1880s (golden syrup packing shed), 1902 (melting house), and c. 1913 (five-storey packing shed). The former Power House contains machinery which demonstrates the power generating process.

Located adjacent to the industrial buildings is a 91-metre-long (300 ft) timber wharf fronting the Maribyrnong River, that provided access to shipping for CSR for the supply of raw materials and dispatch of packaged products, and for adjacent factories operated by Cuming, Smith & Co. and the Mount Lyell Mining and Railway Company. Initially, raw sugar was transported in hessian sacks. During the 1950s, cranes were installed on the wharf to accommodate bulk handling of raw sugar.

The complex at Yarraville is historically significant for the strength of its association with the sugar refining industry and in particular, the Colonial Sugar Refining Company, which was instrumental in the development of cane growing and sugar refining in Australia.

== See also ==
- Australian non-residential architectural styles
- List of places on the Victorian Heritage Register in the City of Maribyrnong
