= Bethungra, Canterbury =

Bethungra
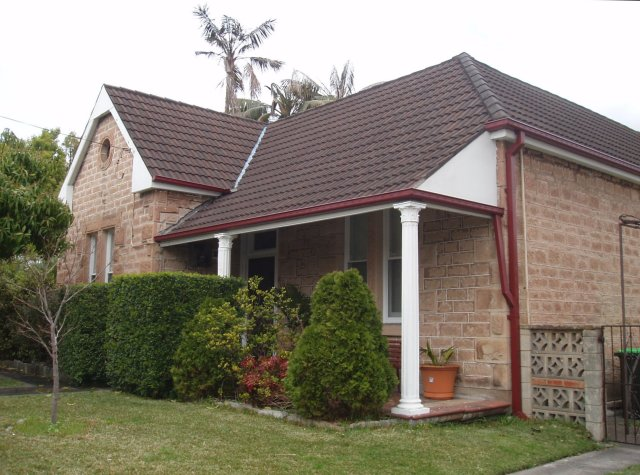

- Location within Sydney Location within Australia
- 33°54′53″S 151°06′56″E
- Location: 9 Fore Street, Canterbury, City of Canterbury-Bankstown, New South Wales, Australia

History
- Built: 1896
- Built for: Quigg family

Site notes
- Architect: Varney Parkes

New South Wales Heritage Register
- Official name: Bethungra
- Type: State heritage (built)
- Designated: 2 April 1999
- Reference no.: 224
- Type: House
- Category: Residential buildings (private)

Bethungra is a large stone house in Sydney, Australia. It is heritage-listed, and was at one time used as a convent, but now a private residence. The house is located at 9 Fore Street, Canterbury, New South Wales. It was designed by Varney Parkes and built during 1896. It was added to the New South Wales State Heritage Register on 2 April 1999.

== History ==
Bethungra was constructed c. 1896 for the Quigg family by Varney Parkes, the son of Sir Henry Parkes. Varney Parkes was a Liverpool Council Alderman, State Parliamentarian (1885 - 1913), MLA for Canterbury 1895-1900 and 1907-1913, Postmaster-General (1889 -1899) and successful architect. He trained under the Colonial Architect, James Barnet between 1878 and 1880. He established a successful architectural practice with C. H. E. Blackmann and was responsible for the design of a wide range of buildings over much of urban and rural New South Wales, including hotels, warehouses, banks, commercial premises and domestic residences. One of his best known designs was the "Marble Bar" for George Adams's hotel in Pitt Street, begun in 1891 (now re-erected within the redeveloped Hilton Hotel on George Street).

Parkes was known for his use of pattern books in the design of his buildings, and the houses he designed in Canterbury for the Quigg and Nicholas families demonstrate his enthusiasm to adopt architectural ideas from overseas for his work in New South Wales. Houses in Fore Street designed by Parkes around the turn of the 19th century, particularly Wyuna at no.10, are characteristic of the transition between the late Victorian Italianate style and the Federation Queen Anne style of domestic architecture. Although these have render decoration characteristic of the Italianate style, the "tower" with conical roof at the end of the veranda of "Wyuna" is typical of the later Federation style, and the house is an important landmark in the transition from one domestic style to another.

Iserbrook, the house that Parkes designed for himself and lived in until 1925, was unfortunately demolished in the 1960s, and replaced by featureless red brick home units. The Estates surrounding the house, large sections of the Bridgewater Estate, were owned and subdivided by Alderman John Quigg, the Mayor of Canterbury (1891), and his son-in-law Frederick Augustus Nicholas. They engaged Varney Parkes to build several other houses on their land, and Parkes remained a family friend and their preferred architect. Another relative by marriage, Jeffrey Denniss, also lived in Fore Street, ran a successful tannery at the eastern junction of Cup and Saucer Creek with Cooks River, and became Mayor of Canterbury from 1900 to 1903.

His friend, Frederick Augustus Nicholas, with his sons started a furniture manufacturing business in Canterbury just after World War I. This was a time of great expansion in the area, 10,000 houses were built in the Municipality between 1919 and 1929, and all of them needed furniture. The family prospered, eventually moving up the hill to land beside John Quigg's house, Austral Eden (now demolished). Fredederick Augustus Nicholas subdivided part of his land, creating a new street, Nicholas Avenue. In 1924, the family went on an overseas tour, and Frederick's wife, Elizabeth Amy Nicholas (formerly Quigg), became particularly impressed with the California Bungalow style of house. She brought back plans for a large residence in this style, and their friend, Varney Parkes, was entrusted with supervising the construction of a new family home in Nicholas Avenue (no.15).

Some time between 1922 and 1931 three other houses were built for the Nicholas sons, probably under the supervision of Parkes, on the land at the southern end of Nicholas Avenue. John Augustus Nicholas married Annie Batting in 1922, and lived in no.18, and Vivian Price Nicholas married Beatrice Mackie in 1925, and lived in no.16. Adrian Howard Nicholas married Una D. Wiseman in 1927, and no.11 was built for him some time between 1927 and 1931.

In 1901 Bethungra was sold to Mary MacKillop (since canonised), the founder of the Sisters of St. Joseph, and was used as a convent for nuns of the Order who were attached to St. Anthony's Catholic Church.

In 1980 the Heritage Council received a request for an Interim Heritage Order from the local historical society as Bethungra had been purchased and a development application submitted for its demolition and construction of a two-story block of six home unties. An Interim heritage Order was placed over the property on 16 July 1980. Following further consideration the Heritage Council placed a Permanent Conservation Order over the property on 23 July 1982. It was transferred to the State Heritage register on 2 April 1999.

== Description ==
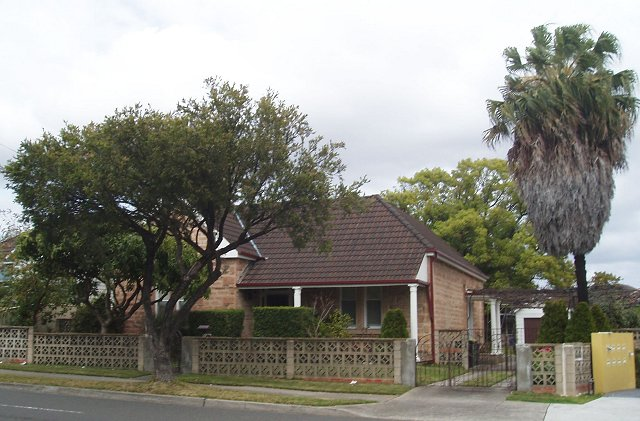
House and garden

Bethungra is constructed of local sandstone quarried from what is now the cliff face above Karool Avenue, Canterbury. The house is a single-storey asymmetrical-form late Victorian style 3-4 bedroom residence. Its construction features rough dressed irregular and tuck-pointed masonry, with rusticated quoins and window dressings.

Varney Parkes designed Bethungra. Parkes was known for his use of pattern books in the design of his buildings, and the houses he designed in Canterbury for the Quigg and Nicholas families demonstrate his enthusiasm to adopt architectural ideas from overseas for his work in NSW. Houses in Fore Street designed by Parkes around the turn of the 19th century, particularly Wyuna at no.10, are characteristic of the transition between the late Victorian Italianate style and the Federation Queen Anne style of domestic architecture. Although these have render decoration characteristic of the Italianate style, the "tower" with conical roof at the end of the verandah of Wyuna is typical of the later Federation style, and the house is an important landmark in the transition from one domestic style to another.

=== Modifications and dates ===
- 1980 – slate roof replaced with concrete tiles. Bullnose verandah removed.

== Heritage listing ==
As at 29 September 2008, Bethungra was a rare example of a substantial Victorian period residence with the local area. Constructed c. 1896, Bethungra is associated with Saint Mary McKillop, the founder of the Sisters of St. Joseph. It was also used as a convent for nuns of the Order who were attached to St. Anthony's Catholic Church.

Bethungra was listed on the New South Wales State Heritage Register on 2 April 1999.
