= Canterbury, New South Wales =

Canterbury
- Suburb
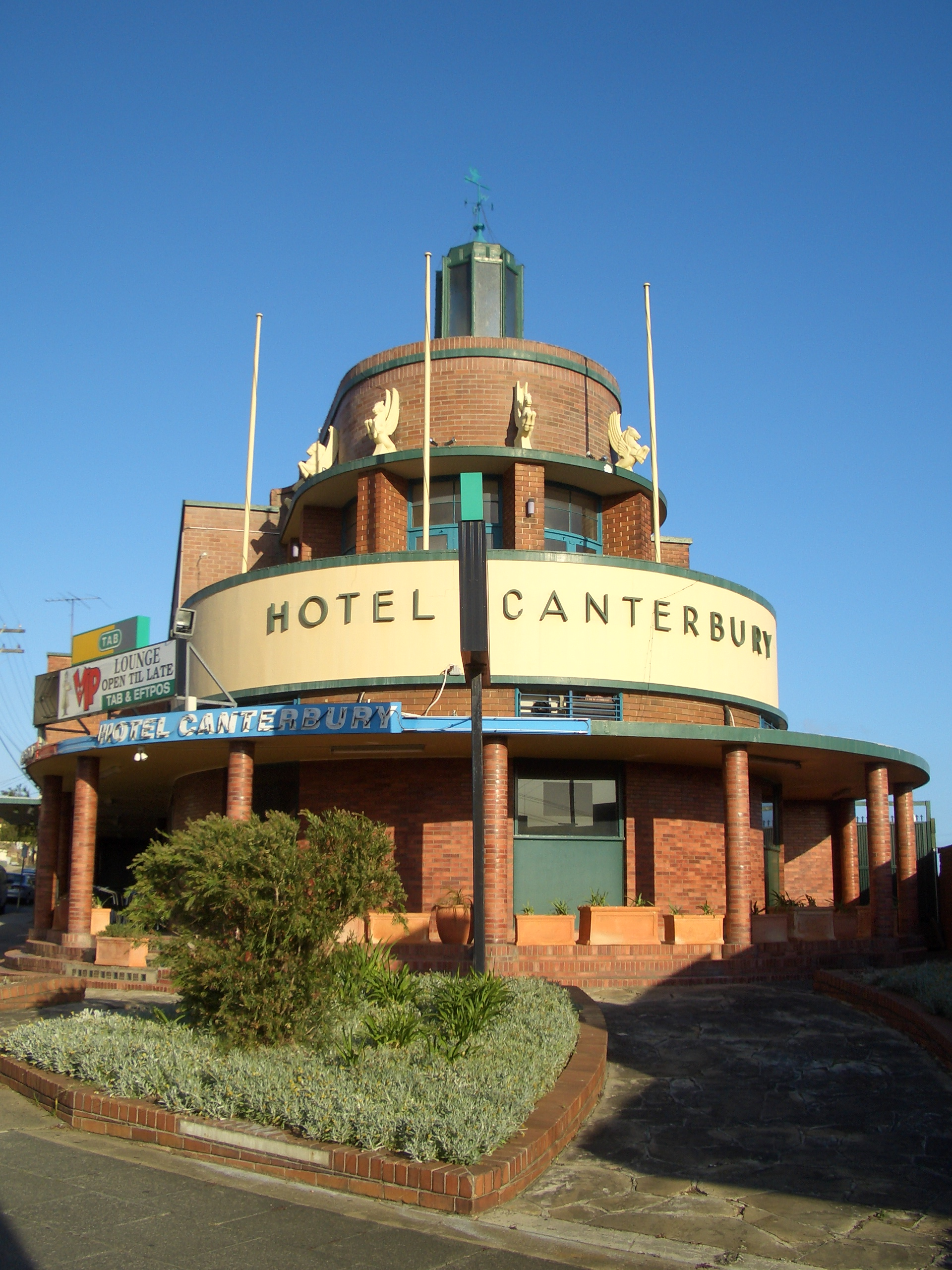
- Canterbury Hotel, Canterbury Road

- Interactive map of Canterbury
- Coordinates: 33°54′45″S 151°07′05″E
- Country: Australia
- State: New South Wales
- City: Sydney
- LGA: City of Canterbury Bankstown
- Location: 11 km (6.8 mi) south-west of Sydney CBD

Government
  - State electorate: Canterbury
  - Federal divisions: Watson; Barton; Grayndler
- Elevation: 26 m (85 ft)

Population
  - Total: 9,430 (2021 census)
- Postcode: 2193
Suburbs around Canterbury
Campsie	Ashbury	Ashfield
Campsie	Canterbury	Hurlstone Park
Clemton Park	Earlwood	Earlwood

Canterbury is a suburb in the state of New South Wales, Australia. Canterbury is located 10.5 kilometres (6.5 mi) south-west of the Sydney central business district in the City of Canterbury Bankstown.

The former City of Canterbury took its name from the suburb, however its administrative centre was located in the adjacent suburb of Campsie, which is also a large commercial centre.

== History ==
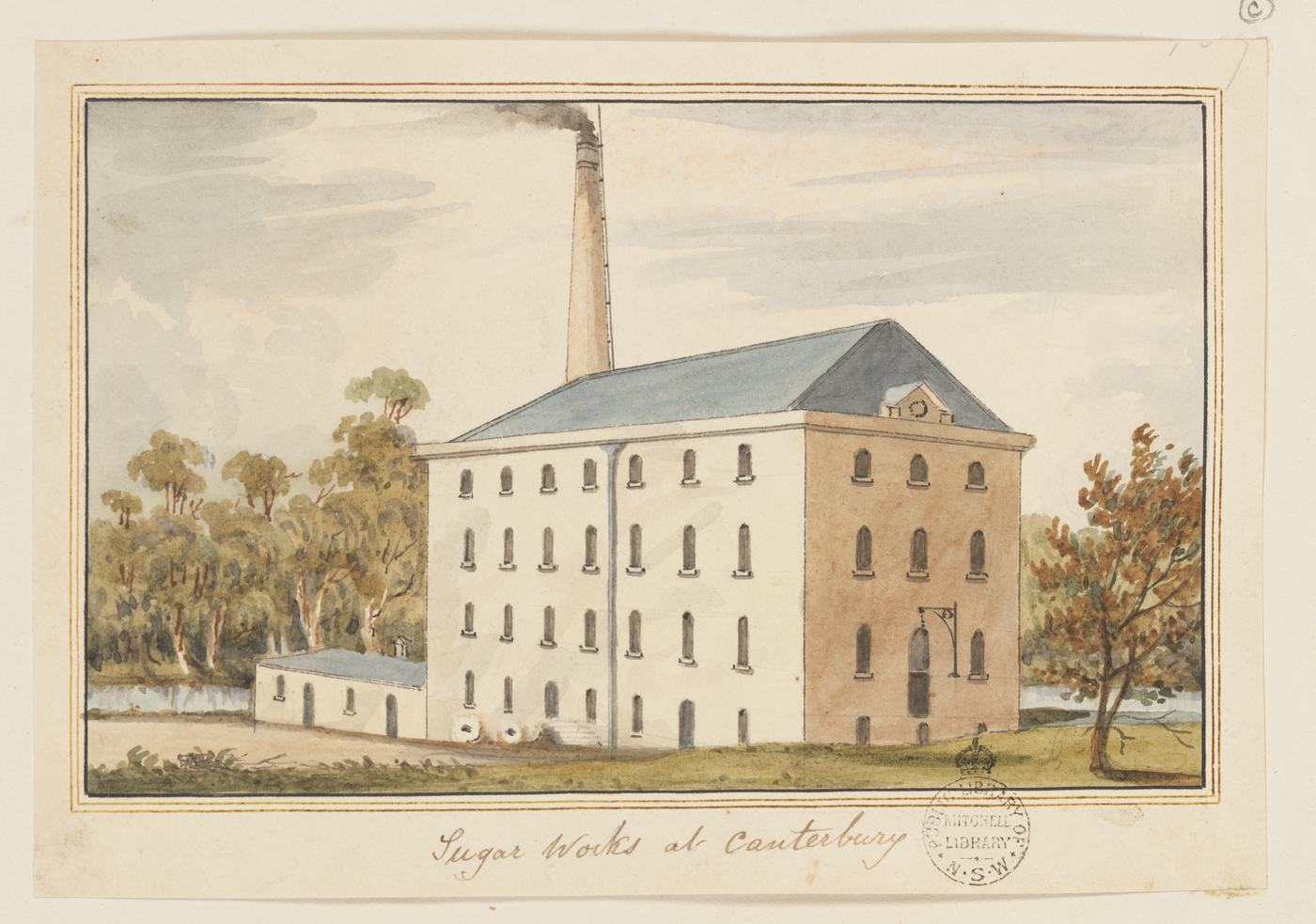
The sugar works, 1840s

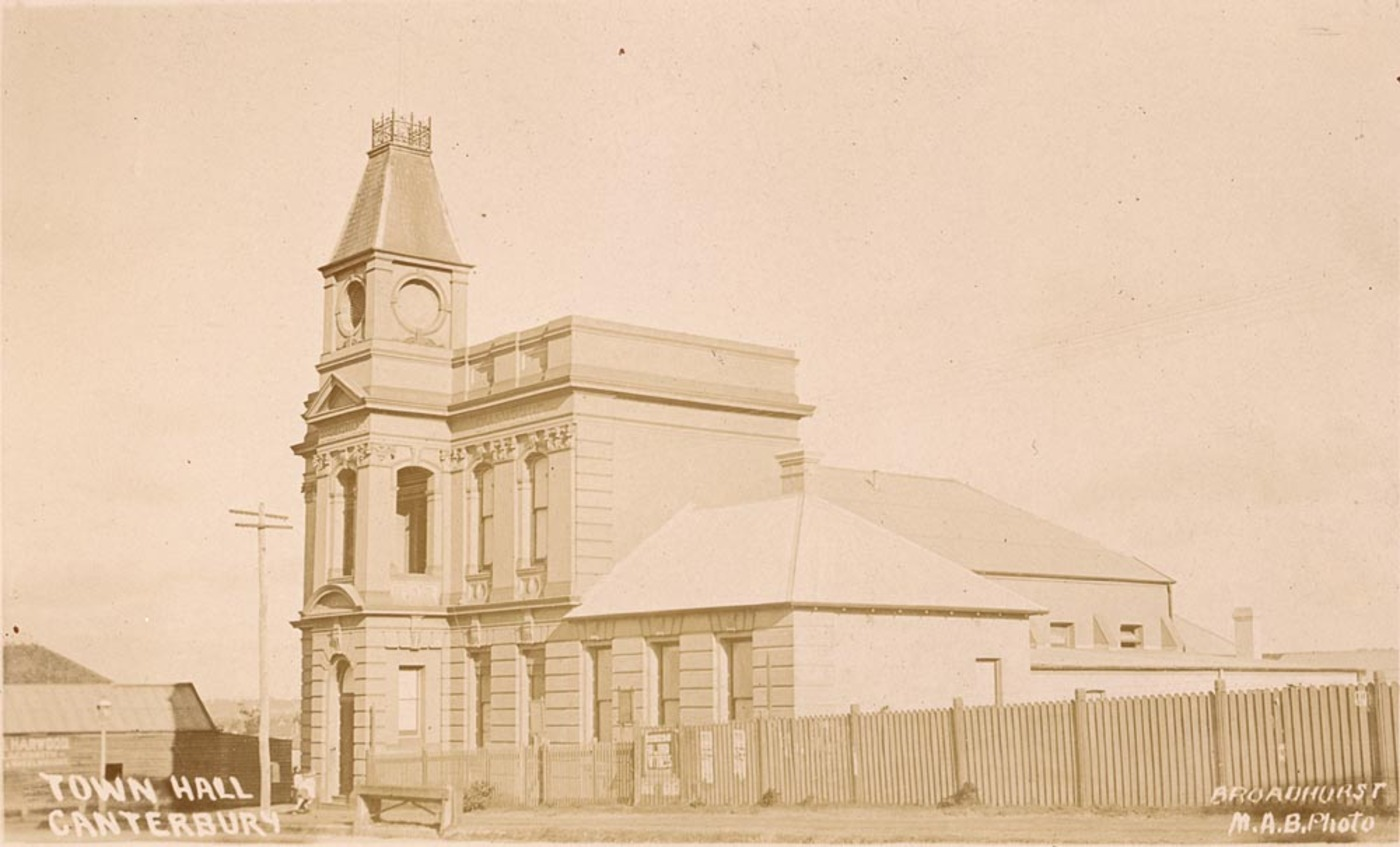
Canterbury Town Hall

The original inhabitants of the area were the Bediagal clan of the Eora nation.

The first European land grant in this suburb was of 40 hectares (100 acres) to a "very good, pious, inoffensive man", the Reverend Richard Johnson (1753-1827), the colony's first chaplain, in 1793. He called his grant Canterbury Vale, as a tribute to Canterbury in England, and the suburb took its name from the farm. The farm extended over the area of modern-day Canterbury and Ashbury suburbs. By 1800, when it was sold to Lieutenant William Cox, the property covered 240 hectares (600 acres). In 1803, when it covered 360 hectares (900 acres), it was sold to Robert Campbell the elder (1769-1846), who then bought up most of the land north to Liverpool Road. The village of Canterbury was formed after 1841 subdivision of this land, then owned by Campbell. Sales of the land in the area west of Canterbury Road and north of the railway were successful, and several other sales followed in the 1840s and 1850s. Although the soil in this area was rather poor, there was some farm cultivation, but the main work was wood cutting and carting, and brickmaking. In 1840 the Australian Sugar Company bought 24 hectares (60 acres) of Campbell's Canterbury estate and a steam engine was installed, but after passing through the hands of several owners, the factory closed in 1856.

Other industries and trades such as boiling down works and tanneries later developed along the river. The Methodists built the first church in the suburb, with services beginning in 1841. The Bankstown railway line was completed in 1895, encouraging suburban development and leading to the area becoming heavily populated. This was too late for the Sugar Mill, which ceased production in September 1854, but was favourable for horse racing, which informally began in 1871.

After much petitioning of the State Government by local residents, the Municipality of Canterbury was proclaimed on 17 March 1879. A Town Hall was opened in 1889, but eventually Campsie became a more important centre and the city administration was moved from Canterbury in 1962.

The first post office opened in 1858, and the first official public school in 1878, and the district slowly developed. Canterbury Park Racecourse, on the northern bank of the Cooks River has been one of Sydney's major racetracks since 1871.

=== Trams ===
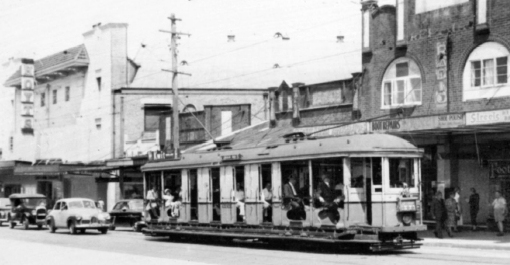
Trams travelling along Canterbury Road

In 1921, a tram line was extended from Hurlstone Park to Canterbury station, and in 1927, a through service from Canterbury to the city commenced. The Canterbury line commenced at the Canterbury terminus in Broughton Street where a tram turning loop was provided. Trams travelling towards the city or Balmain headed north-east along Canterbury Road. A service that was provided for by the Darling Street Wharf trams branched off from the main line at New Canterbury Road and connected with lines running along Parramatta Road for Balmain. Services heading towards Marrickville, Newtown, Sydenham and Tempe turned right into Marrickville Road. The line from Dulwich Hill to Canterbury branched off from the Tempe line at Newtown, travelled along Enmore Road, then Victoria Road, before turning right onto Marrickville Road and all the way through to Canterbury Road to the Canterbury terminus.

Another line also branched off from the route to Dulwich Hill at Addison Road on Enmore Road, then travelled along Addison Road to New Canterbury Road in Petersham. The line then traveled down New Canterbury Road through Dulwich Hill and Hurlstone Park to Canterbury station.

A short lived single track line operated from the Canterbury Line at Hurlstone Park along Old Canterbury Road and Prospect Road to Summer Hill railway station. Services operated between Canterbury and Summer Hill from 1915, however low patronage and competition from motor buses saw the line close in 1933. The disused track and overhead remained in place until the 1950s. Buses replaced the trams in 1954. The Canterbury terminus is currently used as a layover area for buses.

== Heritage listings ==
Canterbury has a number of heritage-listed sites, including:

- Bankstown railway: Canterbury station
- 9 Fore Street: Bethungra, Canterbury
- Sugar House Road: Old Sugarmill

== Demographics ==
At the 2021 census, there were 9,430 residents in Canterbury.

- 42.4% of the population were born in Australia. The next most common countries of birth were China 8.0%, Vietnam 5.0%, Mongolia 2.9%, Nepal 2.9% and Philippines 2.7%.
- 37.1% of the population spoke only English at home. Other languages spoken at home included Mandarin 8.9%, Greek 5.8%, Vietnamese 5.4%, Arabic 4.2% and Cantonese 3.4%.
- The most common responses for religion were No Religion 34.5%, Catholic 22.1%, Eastern Orthodox 8.3%, Buddhism 7.7% and Not stated 7.1%.
- The most common ancestries in Canterbury were Chinese 16.4%, English 13.0%, Australian 12.4%, Greek 7.5% and Irish 5.4%.

== Climate ==
Canterbury has a humid subtropical climate (Cfa) with warm summers and mild winters.

Climate data for Canterbury
Month	Jan	Feb	Mar	Apr	May	Jun	Jul	Aug	Sep	Oct	Nov	Dec	Year
Record high °C (°F)	45.9 (114.6)	43.1 (109.6)	39.0 (102.2)	35.4 (95.7)	28.0 (82.4)	25.6 (78.1)	26.1 (79.0)	30.2 (86.4)	34.7 (94.5)	37.3 (99.1)	40.9 (105.6)	42.3 (108.1)	45.9 (114.6)
Mean daily maximum °C (°F)	27.6 (81.7)	27.3 (81.1)	25.9 (78.6)	23.4 (74.1)	20.5 (68.9)	18.1 (64.6)	17.3 (63.1)	19.0 (66.2)	22.0 (71.6)	23.2 (73.8)	24.6 (76.3)	26.3 (79.3)	22.9 (73.2)
Mean daily minimum °C (°F)	18.3 (64.9)	18.3 (64.9)	16.5 (61.7)	12.7 (54.9)	9.3 (48.7)	6.9 (44.4)	5.8 (42.4)	6.4 (43.5)	9.4 (48.9)	12.1 (53.8)	14.8 (58.6)	16.7 (62.1)	12.3 (54.1)
Record low °C (°F)	10.3 (50.5)	11.1 (52.0)	6.9 (44.4)	2.4 (36.3)	1.5 (34.7)	−0.9 (30.4)	−1.6 (29.1)	0.3 (32.5)	2.7 (36.9)	4.4 (39.9)	6.5 (43.7)	8.5 (47.3)	−1.6 (29.1)
Average precipitation mm (inches)	76.0 (2.99)	106.5 (4.19)	70.4 (2.77)	100.5 (3.96)	88.2 (3.47)	102.2 (4.02)	60.4 (2.38)	53.0 (2.09)	46.1 (1.81)	58.6 (2.31)	84.2 (3.31)	58.8 (2.31)	904.4 (35.61)
Average precipitation days	11.2	11.3	12.0	10.6	11.5	12.8	11.3	7.3	7.2	8.7	12.3	10.2	126.4

== Commercial area ==
High density mixed use buildings are located along Charles Street, Broughton Street, Canterbury Road and Close Street. Commercial developments are mostly situated on Canterbury Road and surrounding streets. Commercial offices will be built along Canterbury Road, Broughton Street, Charles Street and Close Street as part of the Canterbury Centre Masterplan. The current shopping precinct, close to Canterbury railway station, includes an Aldi supermarket and the landmark Hotel Canterbury. Lumex Canterbury is a shopping plaza along Canterbury Road and Cooks Avenue which includes dining shops and a fitness centre. On 16 November 2016, a Woolworths shopping centre opened on the corner of Canterbury Road and Charles Street.

== Transport ==
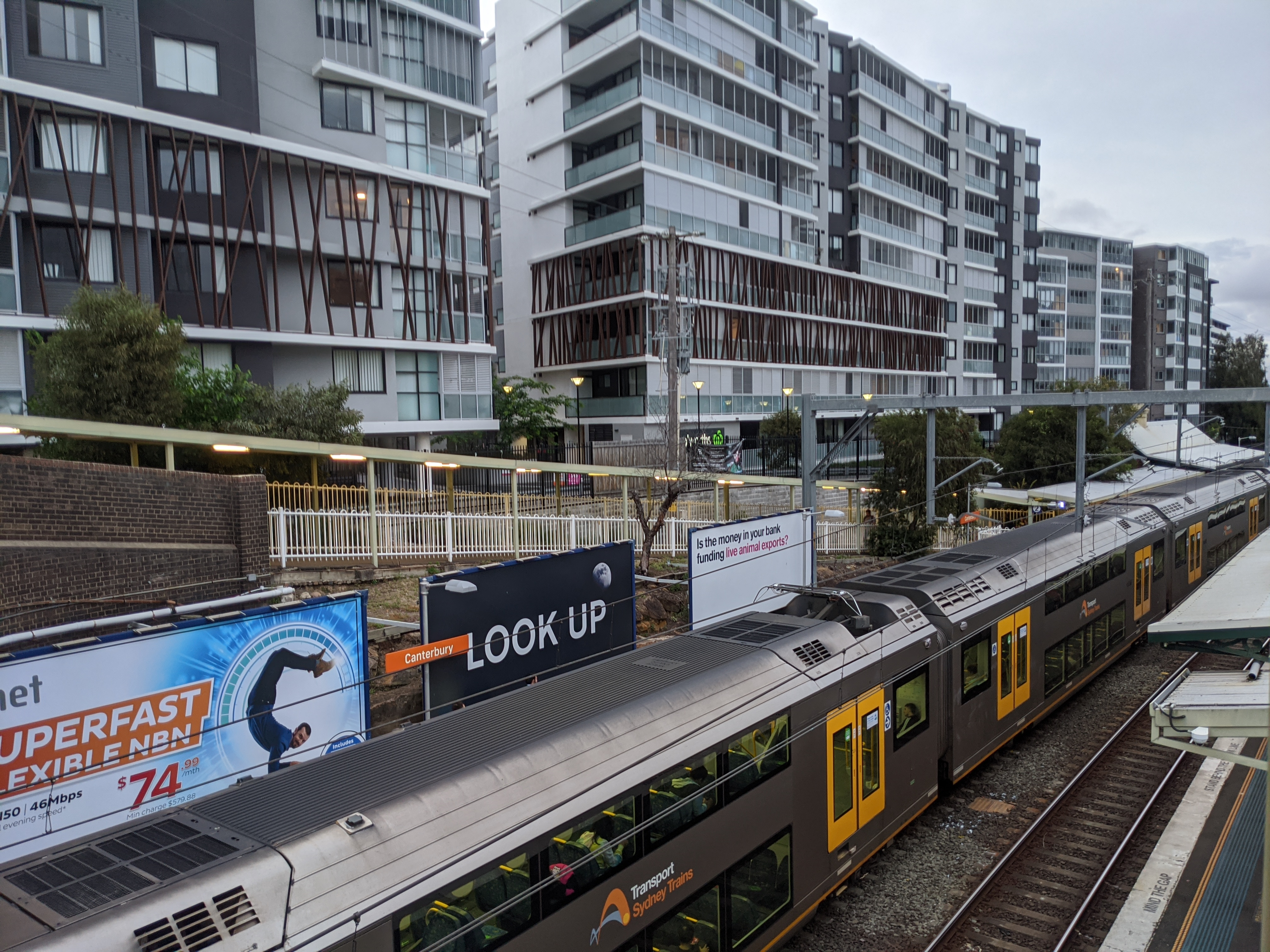
Canterbury railway station

Canterbury Road is a major arterial route, 11 kilometres (7 miles) long and the only vehicular crossing of the Cooks River within the suburb. The road connects the inner suburbs of Sydney with Bankstown and suburbs further to the south-west. Secondary routes, King and Holden Streets, connect the suburb to Ashfield in the north.

Canterbury railway station is located on the Bankstown line of the Sydney Trains network. The line, which crosses the Cooks River, was opened in 1895 and electrified in 1926. The station was closed on 30 September 2024 to allow for the line to be converted to Sydney Metro standards; it reopened on 30 October 2026 as the Metro North West & Bankstown Line. Two additional tracks were laid for goods traffic through to Port Botany. The station is the terminus for several Transit Systems bus routes.

Pedestrians and cyclists can cross the Cooks River at one of two dedicated footbridges making the riverside pleasant and accessible for recreational users. The popular Cooks River bicycle track follows the river along its northern bank connecting the suburb with Homebush to the north-west and Botany Bay to the east. The river itself is navigable only during high tide and used occasionally by canoeists.

== Parks and gardens ==
Extensive parkland may be found on the banks of the Cooks River. Canterbury Park Racecourse, a 33 ha. (82 acre) racecourse on the northern bank, features a 1,578-metre (1,725 yard) track (racecourse) and attracts thousands to its horse racing carnivals.

- Tasker Park is on the southern bank of the Cooks River near the railway bridge. It is named after WS Tasker (Alderman 1925-31 and 1937–44). It includes playing fields, a swimming pool and an ice rink. It is connected to the northern bank by a footbridge.

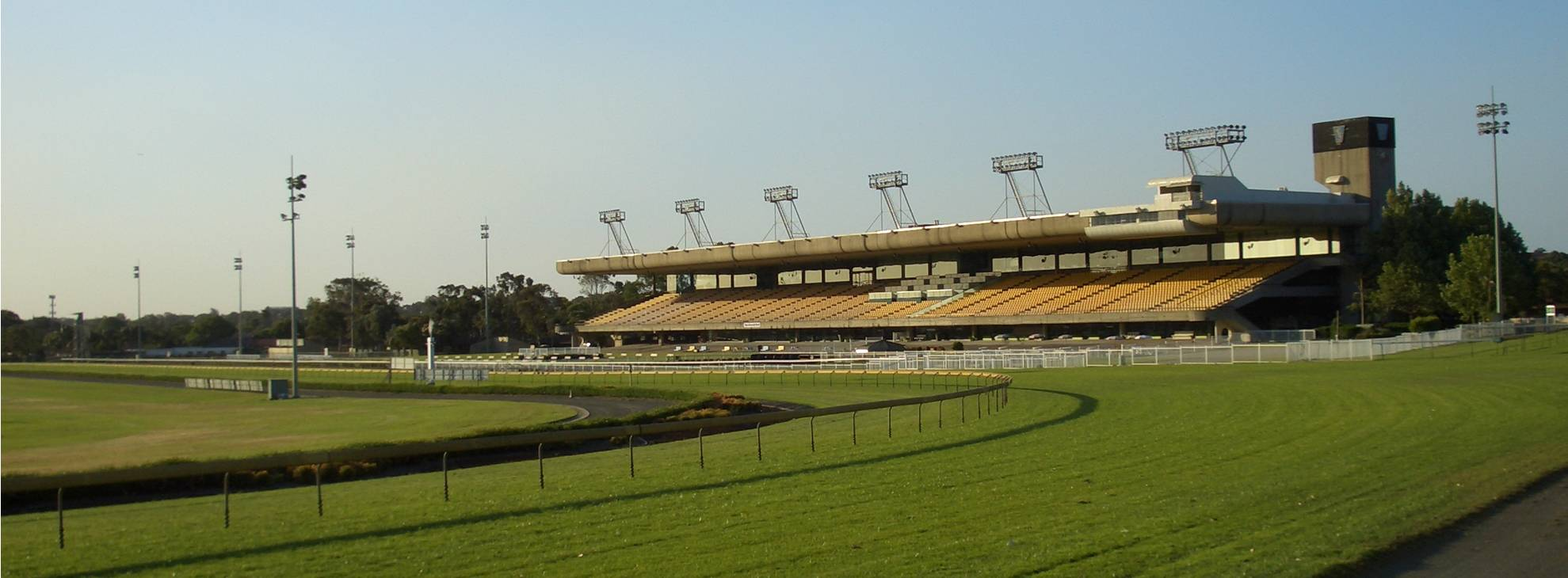
Canterbury Park Racecourse

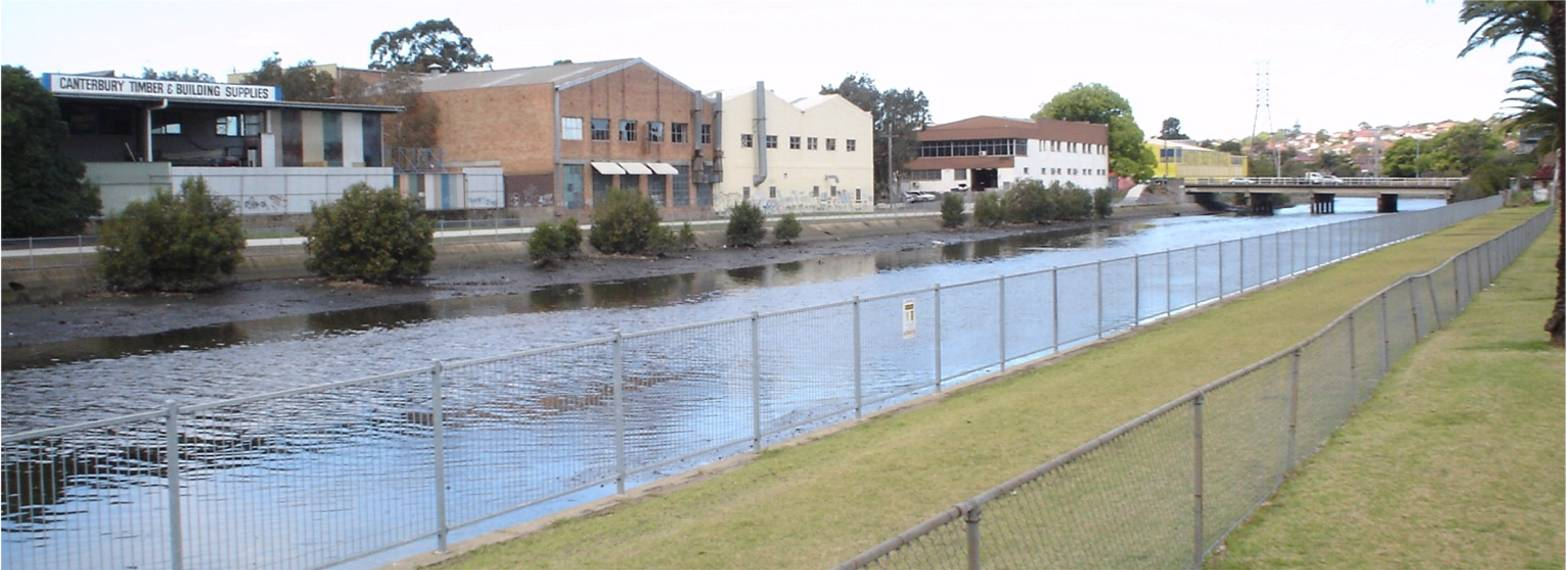
Former industrial area along Cooks River

- Mary MacKillop Reserve is on the southern bank of the Cooks River next to the Canterbury Road Bridge. Originally a rubbish tip, it was built up above flood levels from riverside soils in the 1930s. The reserve was named after Alderman Sydney Hollingsworth Simpson, who helped secure the land, however many residents assumed it was named after Wallis Simpson. A path along the river called "Coronation Row" commemorates the coronation of Queen Elizabeth II and her visit to Sydney in 1953. Simpson Reserve was renamed Mary MacKillop Reserve by Canterbury City Council in 1995.
- Canterbury Park, according to modern boundaries, is part of Ashbury. It is home to Campbell and Blick Ovals.

== Schools ==
- Canterbury Boys' High School
- Canterbury Girls High School
- Canterbury Public School
- Canterbury South Public School

== Churches ==
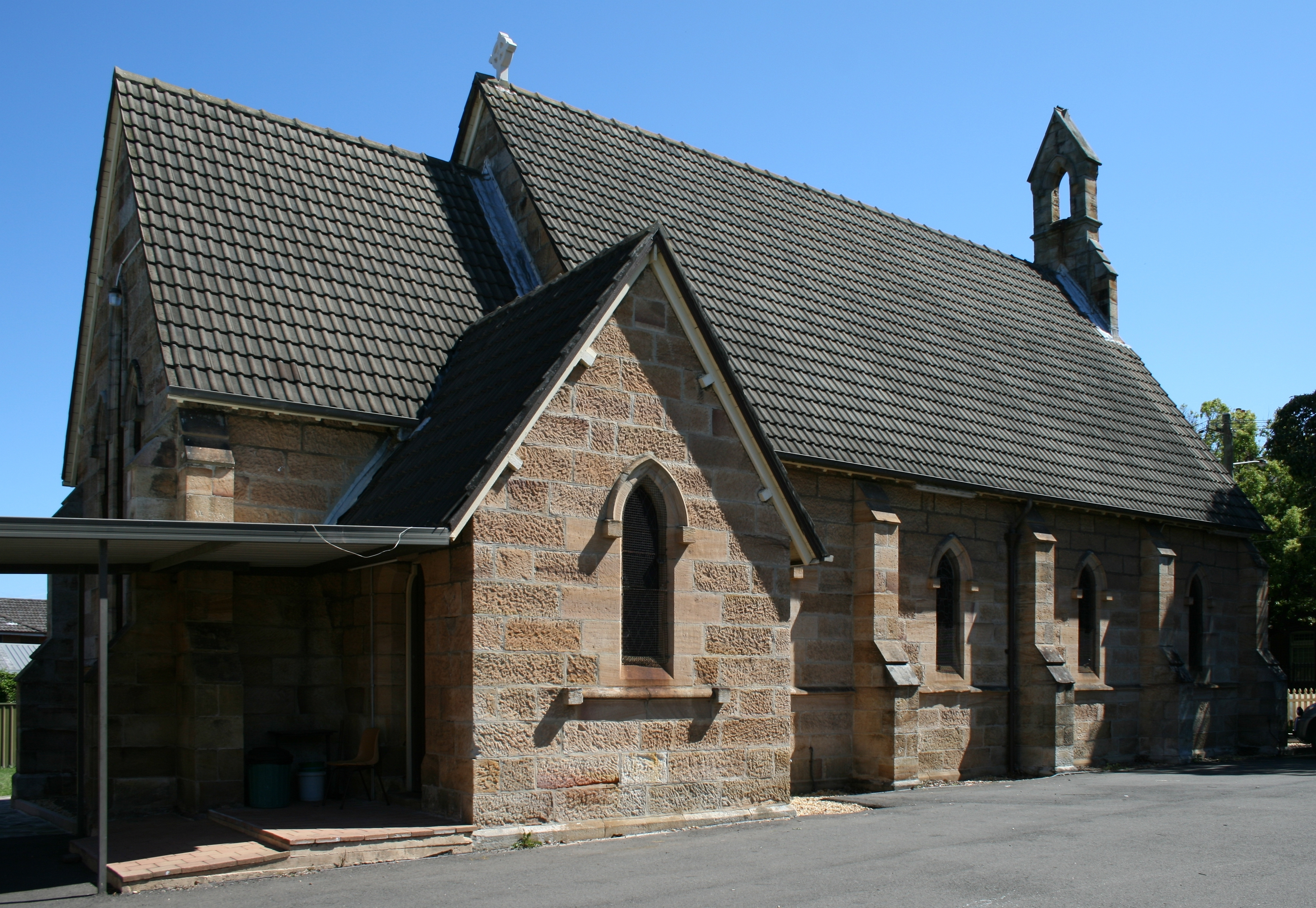
St Paul's Anglican Church

St Paul's Anglican Church is located on 33 Church St. It was built on part of Robert Campbell's Canterbury estate on land donated by his daughter, Sophia Ives Campbell. The Church was designed by Edmund Blacket. It was built from local sandstone and was completed between 1858 and 1859. The church was consecrated on 12 April 1860. It is built in the Gothic Revival Church style with a steeply pitched roof which was originally covered with slate, but now by cement tiles. It features stained glass windows and a lych gate on heavy stone piers.

Uniting Church Fiji Parish is a Fijian Uniting Church located on 301 Canterbury Rd. A Methodist church previously occupied the site.

== Politics ==
Canterbury is located in the Canterbury Ward of the City of Canterbury-Bankstown.

For New South Wales state elections, the suburb is in the Electoral district of Canterbury.

For federal elections, Canterbury is primarily located within the Division of Watson. In state and federal elections, Canterbury residents predominantly vote for the Australian Labor Party.

== Notable residents ==
- Vali Myers, artist, born in Canterbury.

== Gallery ==
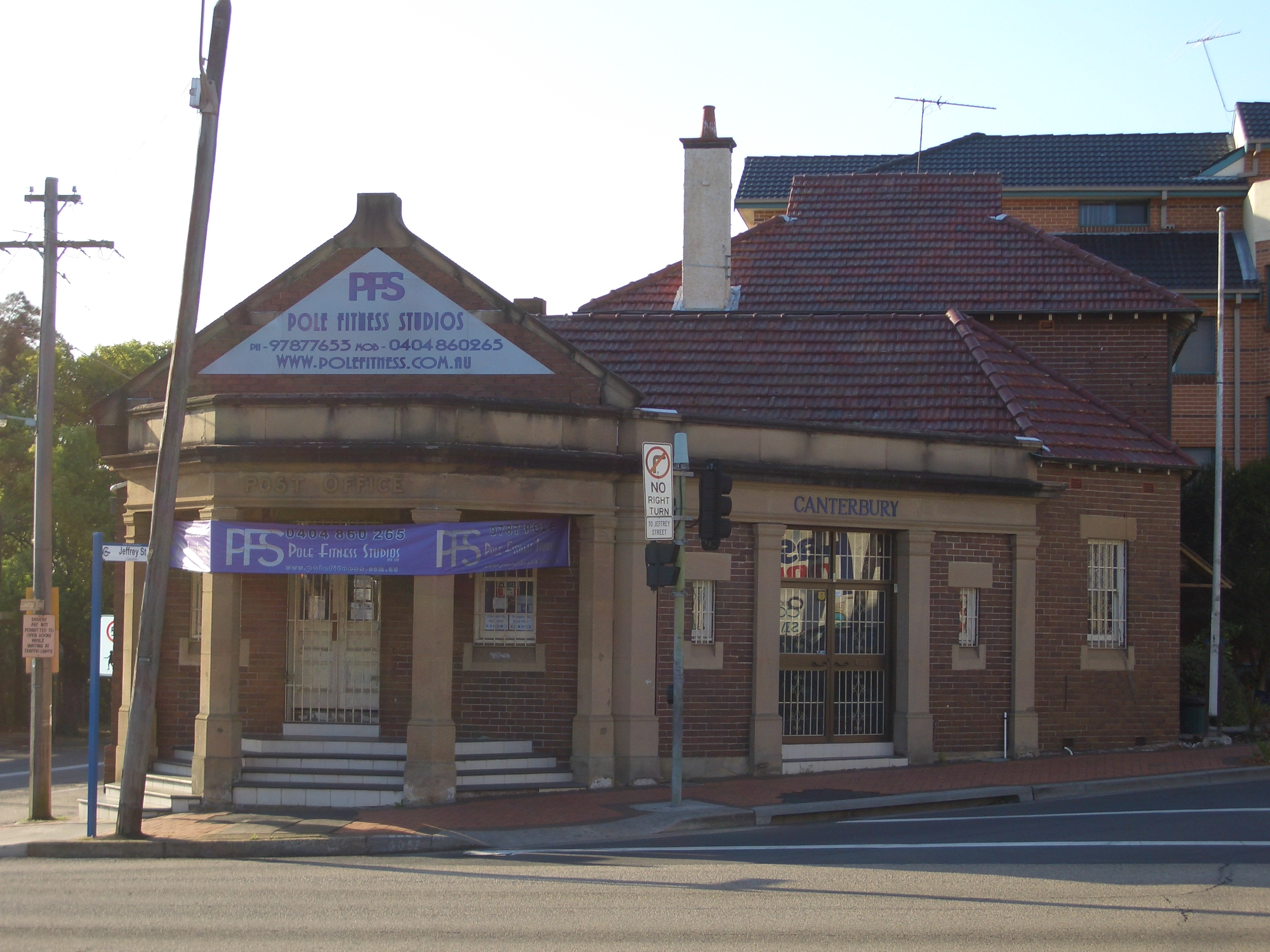
Former Canterbury Post Office building

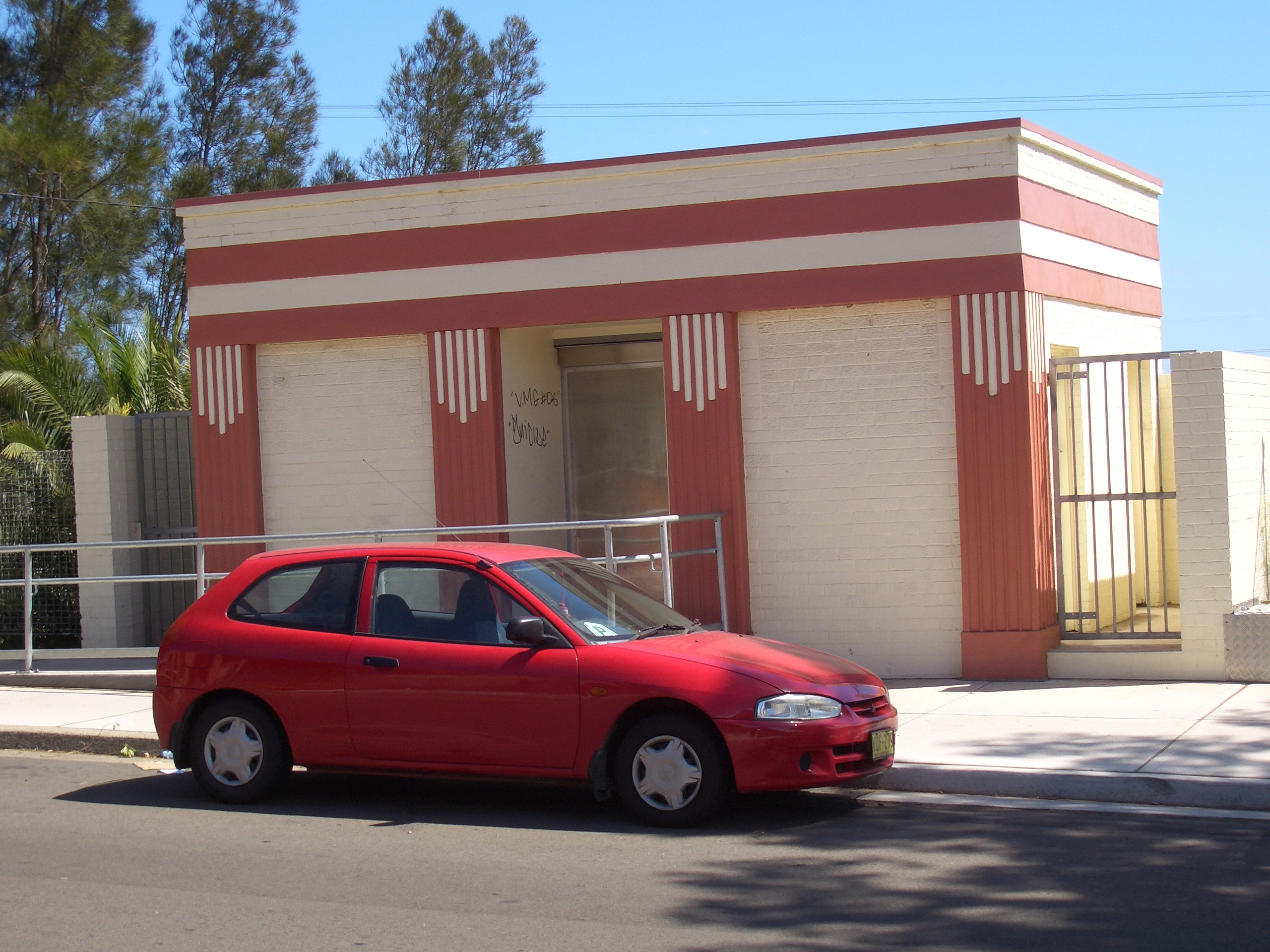
Art-deco amenities building

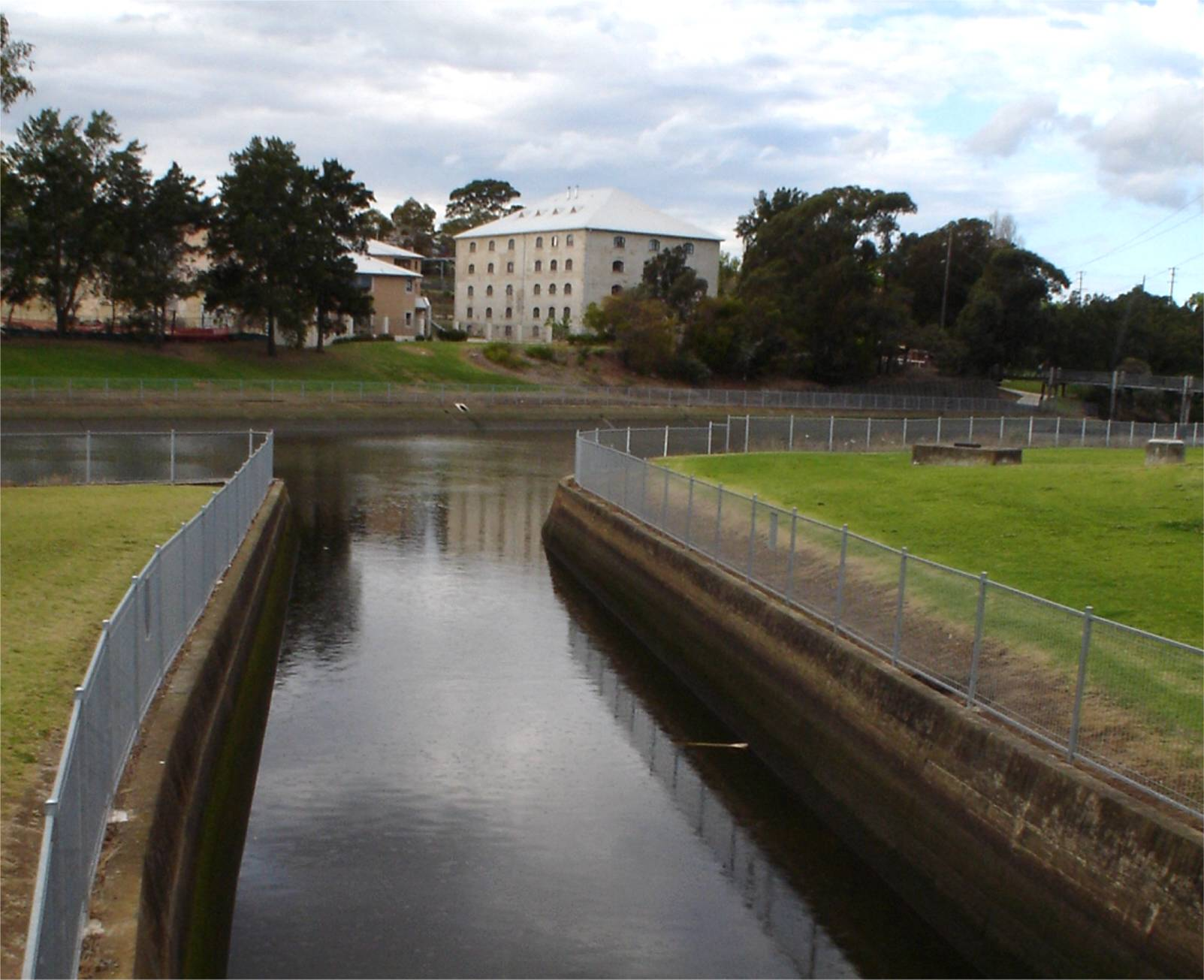
Junction of Cooks River and Cup and Saucer Creek, with old sugarmill in the background

== Bibliography ==
- Pollon, F.; Healy, G., eds. (1988). "Ashbury" and "Canterbury" entries.

== Notes ==
1.Canterbury extends across both sides of the Cooks River, which forms a natural defining boundary around the outer limits of the Inner Western suburbs of Sydney.
