= Alistair Knox =

Australian architect and builder

- Born: Alistair Samuel Knox; 8 April 1912; Middle Park, Melbourne, Australia
- Died: 30 July 1986 (aged 74)
- Education: Scotch College
- Occupations: Designer, Environmentalist, Architect, Builder, Landscape Architect
- Years active: 1946–1986
- Spouse: Mernda Clayton m.1937
- Children: Anthony (Tony) Knox b.1938
- Website: alistairknox.com.au

Alistair Samuel Knox (8 April 1912 – 30 July 1986) was an Australian designer, builder and landscape architect who used recycled materials and mudbrick in his constructions and is considered to be a pioneer of modern mudbrick building, having designed more than 1,000 houses throughout the Nillumbik region of Victoria as well as in other parts of Australia.

== Career ==
Born in the Melbourne suburb of Middle Park, Knox attended Scotch College before leaving, aged 15, to work as a bank clerk in the State Savings Bank of Victoria.

From June 1942, he devoted spare time to the Volunteer Defence Corps, transferring to the Naval Auxiliary Patrol in 1943. In 1944 he joined the Royal Australian Naval Volunteer Reserve serving on HMAS Martindale, in the waters off Papua New Guinea until the end of World War II. Following his discharge he returned to the bank, and in 1946 began to study building construction at Melbourne Technical College; during his studies, he started building two houses near Eaglemont. Post-war shortages of building materials led Knox to consider using mudbrick, and in 1947 he built a mudbrick house in Montmorency.

He later actively campaigned for banks to lend capital for earth-built housing projects, and as a result he helped popularise and legitimise mudbrick buildings in mainstream society.

Largely self-taught, Knox believed that houses should be built using available resources and by working in harmony with the environment. He pioneered an 'Australian' architectural look characterised by a lower, flatter roof line, often with a clerestory to introduce light to the centre of the house and large windows to the living areas to bring the 'outside in'. Second-hand bricks, large eaves, verandahs, natural materials and finishes, adobe walls, timber linings and large beams, brick and slate floors became a feature. These ideals were formed by the strictures of the immediate post-WWII period, as well as his circle of friends in the artistic community, and an independent view of the world.

Knox's main influences were Justus Jorgensen at Montsalvat, Francis Greenaway, Walter Burley Griffin and Frank Lloyd Wright. In landscape design Knox was particularly impressed by the work of Ellis Stones and Gordon Ford, whose espousal of 'bush gardens' he helped to promote. As a building practitioner Alistair Knox played a key role in encouraging and facilitating the self-builder movement. By demystifying the building process he helped empower people to build for themselves.

Knox was a founding member and fellow (1983) of the Australian Institute of Landscape Architects. After more than 30 years of designing and building Alistair Knox was awarded an honorary degree as a Doctor of Architecture by the University of Melbourne in 1984.

== Projects ==
Nanga Gnulle is one of two houses that Alistair Knox designed in the area of Bendigo. It was designed in the early 1970s, and was built with reclaimed materials, including pieces of the demolished Bendigo Natives Association (ANA) Hall, 19th century railway parts, and bricks made by convicts from Bruny Island. The house is a rare example of Knox's mudbrick modernist style, and in 2017 was granted heritage protection.

== Legacy ==
The Alistair Knox Park in Eltham is named after him and many of Knox’s buildings are heritage listed and can be visited during the annual Eltham mudbrick tours.

== Publications ==
- Living in the Environment, Mullaya Publications, 1975. ISBN 0859140156
- We Are What We Stand On: A personal history of the Eltham community, Adobe Press, 1980. ISBN 0949909009
- Alternative Housing: Building with the head, the heart and the hand, Albatross Book, 1980. ISBN 0867600004
- Mud and Man: A history of earth building in Australasia, Earthbuild Publications, 1992. Chapter 8, Victoria - the mud brick state. ISBN 0646069624
