= Iloura Reserve =

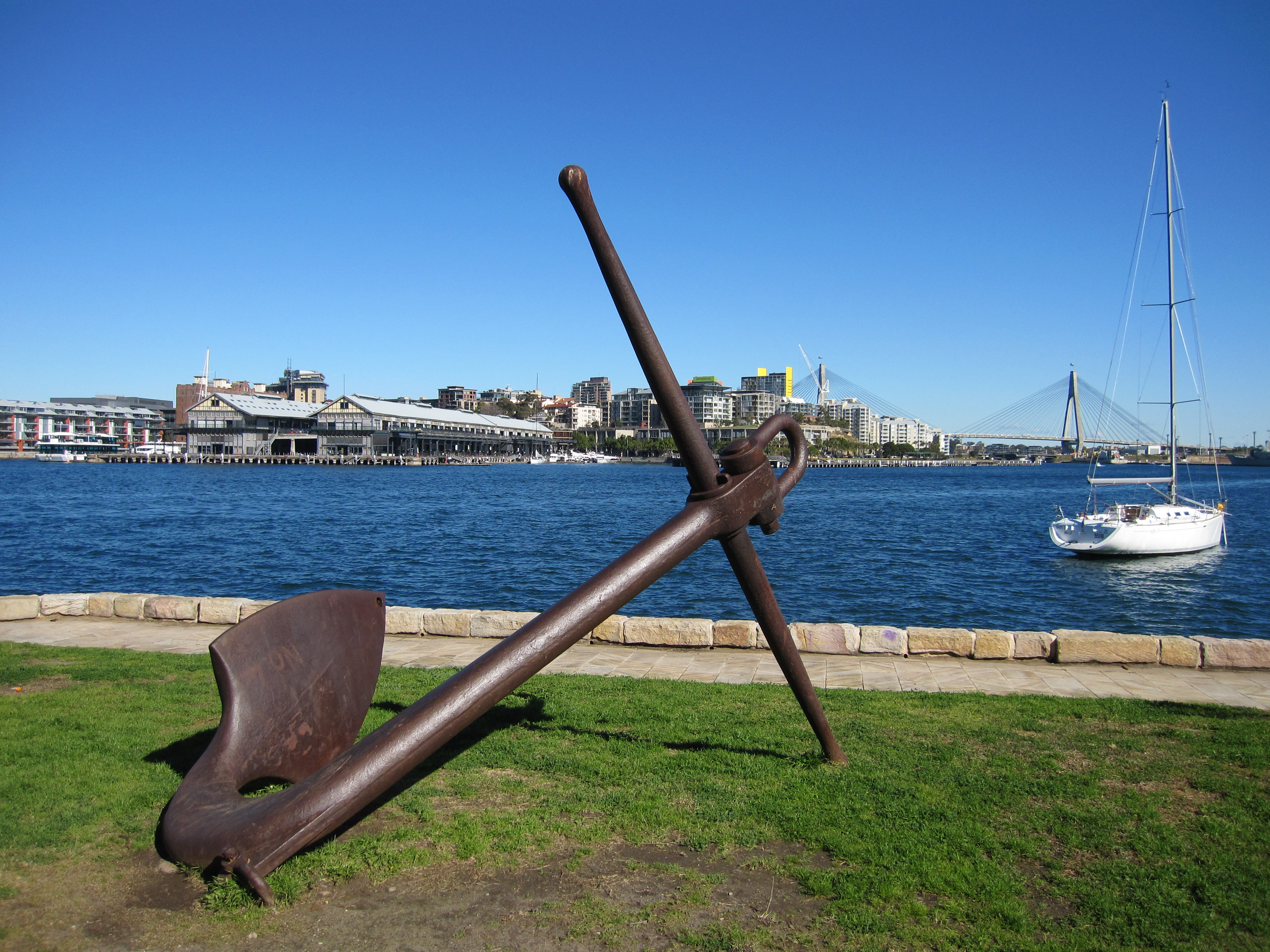
- Peacock Point, 2009

- Location within New South Wales Location within Australia
- 33.8586°S 151.1961°E
- Location: 10–20 Weston Street, Balmain East, Inner West Council, New South Wales, Australia

History
- Built: 1970–

Site notes
- Architect: Bruce Mackenzie
- Owner: Leichhardt Municipal Council

New South Wales Heritage Register
- Official name: Iloura Reserve; Peacock Point; Illoura
- Type: state heritage (landscape)
- Designated: 29 November 2013
- Reference no.: 1923
- Type: Urban Park
- Category: Parks, Gardens and Trees
- Builders: Frank McWilliam, Ted Motley

Iloura Reserve is a heritage-listed public reserve on the site of a former timber yard at 10–20 Weston Street, Balmain East, New South Wales, a suburb of Sydney, Australia. Following the resumption of the timber yard for public space in the 1960s, the present reserve was designed and laid out by landscape architect Bruce Mackenzie and constructed in two stages: stage one in 1970 and stage two in 1981. It is also known as Peacock Point and Illoura. The reserve is owned by the Inner West Council. It was added to the New South Wales State Heritage Register on 29 November 2013.

== History ==
=== Peacock Point ===
The traditional custodians of the peninsula now known as Balmain are the Gadigal and Wangal people of the Eora language group. There is archaeological evidence of human occupation in the Sydney area dated at least 20,000 years ago. Being among the first to encounter the British the Wangal population was also one of the first to be highly impacted by disease and dispossession. Following the Second World War Aboriginal people began to move back to the cities and settled in the suburbs of Redfern, Alexandria and Balmain.

Prior to 1835 the landscape of Balmain was rocky, with dense tea tree scrub spotted with eucalypts and abundant flora and fauna. The Sydney Gazette of 1818 shows a grant to William Balmain: an estate consisting of 550 acres at the Northern Boundary known by the name of Balmain's Farm. Prior to returning to England, Balmain transferred the land to John Gilchrist. Gilchrist subsequently subdivided the land and in 1836 auctioneer George William Paul purchased Lot 4 and Lot 6 of the first portion to be divided into 22 lots located on the Balmain East end of the peninsula. In 1855 Mort's Dock opened in Waterview Bay and was indicative of the intense maritime industrial expansion on the edges of the peninsula.

The suburban development of Balmain commenced from 1836 and grew slowly until the new industrial development of the 1850s onwards drew an influx of workers and their families to live on the peninsula. A ferry service commenced about this time connecting the suburb to the city bringing workers for the shipyards along the harbour foreshores. As the population increased so did the demand for services – houses, shops, churches, schools, police, a hospital and local government with Balmain Council being formed in 1860. Social institutions also arose at this time and many clubs were formed including rowing, swimming, bowling and cricket. Institutes such as the Balmain Literary Institute, the Balmain Working Men's Institute and Balmain School of Arts were also established.

The lots between Peacock Point and Darling Street and Weston Street which had been laid out in 1836 had a number of owners. Immediately adjacent to Illoura Reserve was 2–8 Weston Street which was purchased in 1840 by shipwright John Bell and on which he built a stone wharf and shipwright's yard. Bell died in 1847 and the shipwright's yard was run by his sons until 1883 when it was sold to J. Fenwick and Co.

The southern end of the peninsula is named after Captain John Jenkins Peacock who purchased the land in 1836. Peacock was the son of a convict and started his days as a farmer with a grant of 250 acres on the Hawkesbury. In 1834 he moved to Market Wharf after a time trading between the Hawkesbury River and Sydney. Peacock was a merchant and owner of ships: he owned the barque Sir William Wallace and other vessels and he traded in New Zealand where he bought wharves and land, he also had land on the Parramatta River and in the Hunter Valley. He was a licensee of the Dundee Arms in Gloucester Street, Sydney in 1840 and in 1842 he was appointed a director of the Union Assurance Co. He was an Alderman on City of Sydney Council from 1842 to 1843. In 1836 Peacock purchased four acres of the first sub-division of Balmain, opposite his Miller's Point wharf. By the 1840s it became evident he had spread his business empire too thin and by September 1843 he was facing insolvency. He sold off his 38 Balmain lots in 1841.

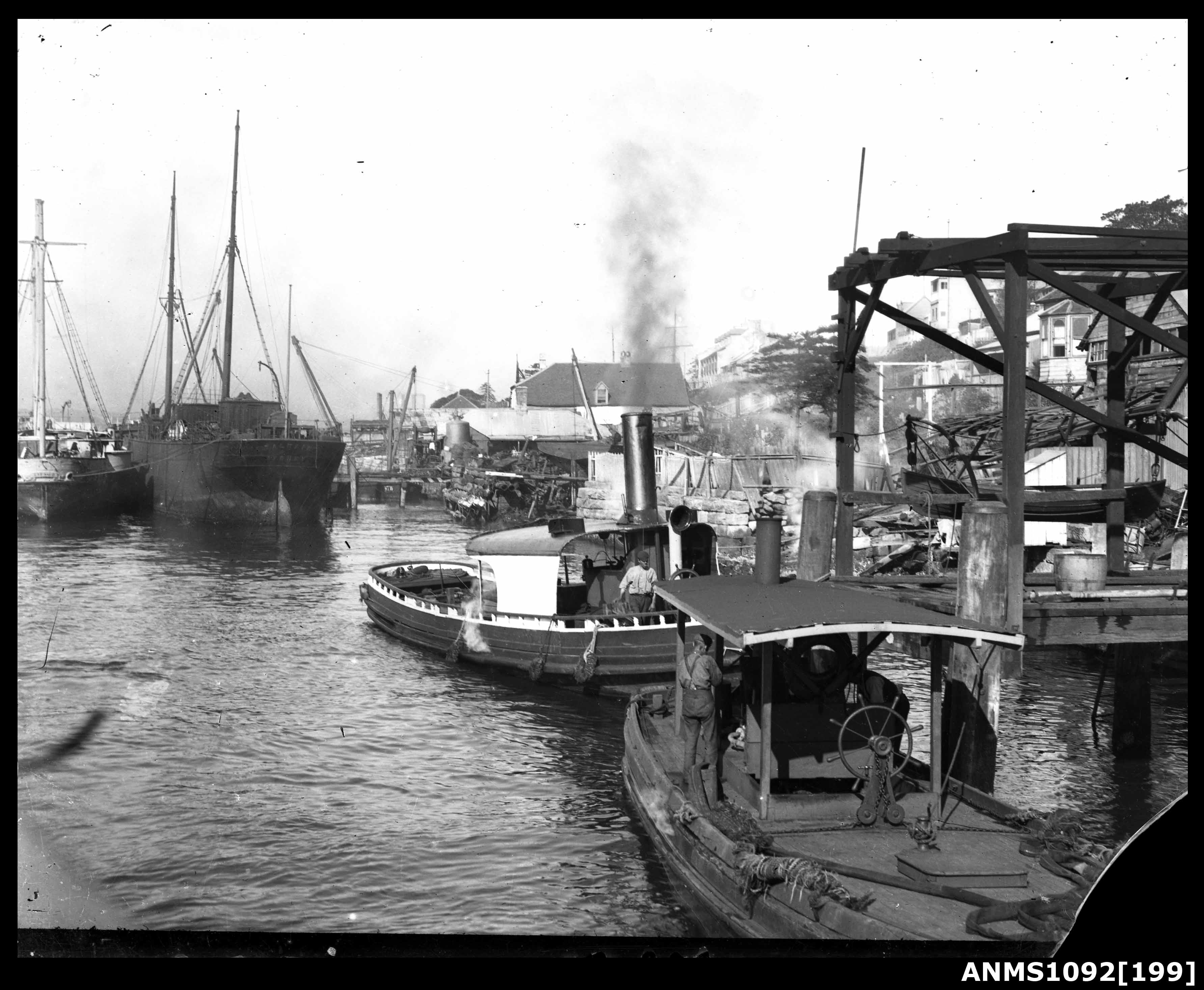
Peacock Point, 1900

The 1888 map of Peacock Point shows that there had been land reclamation and a large amount of building construction by this time. The natural shore line is indicated on the map set well back from the reclaimed land edge in all but two locations, the largest of which is opposite William Street. By 1943 the whole foreshore of the site had all been reshaped and extended out into the bay. 1943 aerial photography clearly indicates that the maritime industrial use of the site continued well into the 20th century. Ships can be seen tied up to wharfs, one of which appears to have a crane for loading and unloading ships.

The first Harbour Master was appointed to the Port of Sydney in 1811. Ninety years later the Sydney Harbour Trust took over the administration of the Port of Sydney. In 1936 the Maritime Services Board was formed to take control of all NSW ports with the exception of Port Kembla. The MSB was responsible for ports with jurisdiction over all navigable waters until it was dissolved in 1995 under the Port Corporatisation and Waterways Management Act 1995.

The foreshore land at Weston Street and Peacock Point came under the management of the MSB and was used as a lumber yard until State Planning Authority planners Nigel Ashton and Lindsay Robertson acquired the site along with other harbour side sites for public open space. In 1968 Ashton engaged Bruce Mackenzie to undertake the landscape design which was constructed in two stages: Stage One in 1970 and Stage Two in 1981.

Iloura Reserve was enlarged in 2008 following Leichhardt Council's acquisition of the adjacent Fenwick & Co Boat Store site.

=== The Modern Movement in landscape design and its use at Iloura ===
The influence of the Modern Movement in landscape design in Australia was seen early in the 20th century in the works of Walter Burley Griffin and Marion Mahony Griffin. At Castlecrag they demonstrated how buildings could be integrated with the natural environment. After World War II young Australian architects, like Richard Clough, Bruce Rickard, Peter Spooner and Allan Correy, returned from overseas with qualifications in landscape architecture, having been exposed to the Modern Movement. In the 1950s Rex Hazelwood advised Willoughby Municipal Council, planting spotted gums, turpentines and other native trees. Modern architect designed homes of the 1940s and 1950s were set in contrast to a natural setting or were integrated with a natural setting; both approaches relied upon the retention of native trees whilst building. In the 1940s and 1950s notable Australian landscape designer Edna Walling had begun to regularly use Australian plants in her designs and advocated for them in her book The Australian Roadside (1952).

The 1960s and the 1970s saw the rise of the Sydney School of architecture. This was an architecture practised within the Sydney region that expressed a natural affiliation with the Australian landscape; it integrated nature and architecture through spatial arrangements and choice of rustic simple materials and the application of craftsmanship. For example, Tocal College received both the Sulman and Blacket medals in 1965 and is credited with firmly establishing the Sydney School idiom: "Expressive structural use of robust and enduring materials seamlessly integrated within its landscape setting was a groundbreaking approach to institutional design."

Meanwhile, public attitudes to the urban environment began to change; by the 1960s and 1970s the environmental movement was on the rise. The publication of Rachel Carson's influential book Silent Spring in 1962, the rise of environmental organisation Greenpeace, reaction in Tasmania to the Lake Pedder and Franklin Dam projects and the rise of the Tasmanian Greens political party were all indicators of the greater public awareness of the natural environment. The use of local plant species in private gardens was being popularised by Thistle Harris in her book Australian Plants for the Garden (1953); Betty Maloney and Jean Walker's books Designing Bush Gardens (1966) and More About Bush Gardens (1967) and Ellis Stones in her book Australian Garden Design (1971).

Likewise landscape practitioners like Bruce Mackenzie rejected the traditional design of urban parks which used introduced plants and formal spaces. Bruce Mackenzie describes this new way of thinking as a "respect for a spirit of place, the land, the genus loci." Landscape architects began responding directly to the immediate site as well as having an appreciation of the broader landscape. The movement took on the name "Sydney Bush School".

Mackenzie describes the impact and the essential elements of his Sydney Harbour Park designs:

"Sydney Harbour Parks turned out to be a somewhat ground breaking realisation using local materials in a direct response to the immediate environment and the elements of the harbour landscape. The ideas had been developing in previous years with prior experience at Commodore Heights, Ku-ring-gai Chase National Park, and then current involvement with Sydney Kingsford Smith International Airport (not documented).

"Plant species, sandstone walls and cliff faces, wharf poles and jetties, combined to be so evocative of the harbour's sense of place. Assembled together in a way that had not been done before, recreating the charms of the Sydney natural bush and sandstone, much-loved harbour side places and childhood bush playgrounds. Another important aspect was that the flow of landscape design responded to the informal thrusts of the existing site, to its vague shapes and levels.

"Human patterns of usage – paths and walks, lookouts, picnic areas and car parks touched a chord of recognition for professionals and public alike – this is our landscape, this can be truer to our character than English parks or French formality, and so many times more pleasurable."

Mackenzie coined a term for these park designs: "Alternative Parkland". Illoura was the first of these harbour side parks or "alternative parklands". Illoura Reserve has been described by the National Trust of Australia (NSW) as a seminal work and is described by the Australian Institute of Landscape Architecture as a critical contribution to Australian landscape architecture.

Few people in Sydney at that time could identify local plant species and very few nurseries propagated them. The concept had never been tested in public parks, let alone sites which had disturbed and possibly contaminated soil conditions. Finn Thorvaldson, a young architect who assisted Mackenzie on the project, describes how they obtained Casuarina glauca (Swamp Oak) for the project:

"the only thing that would grow close to the water, because of the water table, was Swamp Oak, Casuarina glauca, and of course no nursery had Casuarina glauca, it didn't exist in their vocabulary, but Bruce did employ somebody to collect the seed for that and actually grow it, so that was grown in a nursery for a year and then planted out. So it was a slightly different approach to going to buy plants off the shelf as you do now."

Over the years Mackenzie was the first to grow and test other local plant species that are commonly used today, including Lomandra longifolia, Westringia fruticosa and Cissus Antarctica.

Mackenzie's design approach at Peacock Point represents an early attempt to balance ecological, social and aesthetic values, although he would not have described it in those terms. In ecological terms the planting of large numbers of local trees and shrubs in a thick layer of recycled mulch created a better microclimate in the park and reduced weeding, mowing and watering requirements. Apart from reinstating the aesthetic qualities of "the bush", the choice of local plant species was seen as a way to attract birds and insects. Many of the materials such as telegraph poles, wharf piles, dimensioned sandstone and mulch were recycled, made possible by the abundance of second-hand materials generated by the demolition of old buildings in Sydney during the 1960s and 1970s. Although terms like "sustainability" and "biodiversity" had not yet been coined, Peacock Point was sustainable in terms of construction methods, materials and maintenance.

In terms of community, Peacock Point was a clear statement of egalitarianism: it provided the residents of Balmain, an old and densely populated suburb, with a local park that was safe, accessible, inviting and comfortable, and one which provided a variety of spaces and range of activities for all ages. The park also gave unrestricted access to the harbour, allowing all members of the public, not just a privileged few, to enjoy the panoramic views of the city from the upper levels and to gain access to the waterfront at the lower levels. In terms of delight, Mackenzie created a "remarkable spatial quality due to the Harbour location, the sandstone cliffs and outcropping, and the complex sequence of spaces created by the use of built structures and planting".

=== Bruce Mackenzie and the Sydney Bush School ===
Bruce Mackenzie was born in 1932 and raised in a suburb where the bush was still a part of its framework. His first experience of being closely involved in the detail of "the bush" and the design of buildings was in the design of his own house with his wife Beverley on the rough bushland block at Dartford Road, Thornleigh. In 1960 he opened a landscape contracting business and began working with, leading modernist architects such as Harry Seidler, Sidney Ancher, Mortlock Murray & Woolley, Don Gazzard, Michael Dysart and Peter Johnson.

At this time he also developed a close relationship with Alistair Knox and Gordon Ford in Eltham, Melbourne, and through them he experienced the "bush garden" movement, originating in the work of Edna Walling and Ellis Stones. Mackenzie and Knox both shared a passion for the search for an "Australian Identity".

In 1964 Mackenzie was the landscape architect for four Pettit and Sevitt houses in Richmond Avenue, St Ives. Here he minimised the building footprint so that the natural landscape features of the sites were kept intact and created a mature garden on open-day. In the same year he designed a lookout area at Commodore Heights, West Head with architect Russell Smith for Ku-Ring-Gai Chase National Park Trust, expressing a subtle adaptation of modernist principles to a living site, and was believed to be a prototype for Peacock Point, Balmain.

Between 1966 and 1971 Mackenzie worked on the campus of the Teachers College at Lindfield (later UTS Kuring-Gai); here he showed how cooperation between the architect and landscape architect with strict protection of the adjoining bushland and sympathetic planting of rooftop gardens could achieve an 'intimate fusion of landscape and noble architecture' In 1967 he designed a significant garden on the roof space of the modernist Reader's Digest Building by architect John James.

Together with landscape architects, Bruce Rickard, Harry Howard, and Allen Correy, Bruce Mackenzie established what became known as the Sydney Bush School of landscape architecture. These four landscape architects designed and constructed public landscapes in Sydney which combined the "universal values of modernism and the specific qualities of the Australian landscape". This approach was intimately tied to the Sydney School of architecture which was also establishing itself during this time. In many instance the architects and landscape architects worked closely together. An influential part in the development of the philosophy behind these design schools was the interaction between colleagues which took place at the offices at 7 Ridge Street, North Sydney. Bruce Mackenzie shared the Ridge Street offices with like minded architects, designers and artists such as Ian McKay, Harry Howard, Bruce Rickard and Harry Seidler and photographer David Moore. Designed as a purpose-built space for a community of designers the building was an incubator for design ideas. Many of the landscape architects who went on to build the profession in Australia including; Helen Evans, Finn Thorvaldson, Catherin Bull, Nell Rickard, Victoria GroundsGrounds, Ian Olsen and Jane Coleman, worked with Mackenzie in this office.

In an interview with Barbara Buchanan in Bruce Mackenzie describes this time at Ridge Street:

"There was that sense of being part of a group of fellow travellers who comprehended the same language and the same aspirations, the same projections . . . And of course we are not just talking about bush, but we are talking about design and planning, aesthetics and the circumstances and the environment of society, of the community, of the way you lived and worked and the way you played. It was that sort of association of people.".

Mackenzie's practical knowledge of the indigenous species of Sydney's bush and landscape construction made him a person of influence amongst his peers who often consulted him in these matters. Mackenzie in turn enjoyed the opportunity to have access to other designers and modernist ideology. The Sydney Bush School evolved through this cross fertilisation of ideas. His first major work whilst in the offices at 7 Ridge Street was Peacock Point.

The Australian Institute of Landscape Architects (AILA) selected Sydney Harbour Parks as one of the most significant projects between 1966 and 2000.

== Description ==
Illoura Reserve was constructed on an abandoned waterfront site known as Peacock Point that was reclaimed for public use by creation of a public park. The site had been stripped of all indigenous vegetation and used as an industrial site and then abandoned and fenced off. The lessee, Maritime Services Board, in 1970 instigated a clean-up and landscaping project before it handed the land over to the council as a public reserve.

A combination of responding to the site, identifying and relating to the environment and paying respect to the future visitors inspired the vision for the reserve at Peacock Point. Although its natural features had been removed the underlying sandstone survived: banks of fill were scraped back to reveal the rock features beneath. Stone steps and paths were incorporated into the levels emphasising the natural stone. A large viewing platform and stairs constructed from recycled wharf timbers connects the levels and celebrates the unique waterfront location and its views to the city. Construction materials consisted of materials recycled from the site and other demolition sites around Sydney. Using a language of sandstone retaining walls and flagging, massive timbers and native plants with large areas of mulch rather than grass, the park gave the harbour side Peacock Point location back to the community along with an entirely new experience of enjoying an urban bush environment.

Mackenzie set about re-establishing an abstracted version of "bushland" using local plant species which linked the park to the other headlands in the harbour:

"There is a distinct ecologically-based progression from Casuarinas at the water's edge, through leptospermum and westringias, to melaleucas and eucalypts. The mature figs which edge both parks enhance the sense of progression from the water's edge to the tall canopy of the woodland, and define the beginning of the urban areas."

Mackenzie not only used the materials of Sydney Harbour such as sandstone blocks and wharf timbers but he created an urban park with a strong sense of its location on Sydney Harbour. A restoration plan for the reserve designed by Bruce Mackenzie and Associates was adopted by Leichhardt Municipal Council and implemented to ensure the original design intent was conserved and reinstated.

== Heritage listing ==
Iloura Reserve is an outstanding twentieth century urban park that was an important forerunner to the implementation of the Sydney Bush School landscape design philosophy in public parks. Illoura Reserve is a seminal work of landscape architecture by one of the pioneers of the Sydney Bush School movement, Bruce Mackenzie, who created a landscape which was instrumental in changing public expectations in the design of public open space.

Iloura Reserve was part of a movement towards environmentally conscious landscape design that was respectful of the special qualities existing in a place; retaining natural rock formations; reintroducing native vegetation; and interpreting the former industrial character of the place through the use of robust recycled timbers and sandstone blocks. The reserve was designed to provide an alternative to the ordered European based designs common in public parks at that time and provided the park user with a bush retreat within the city.

The reserve is held in very high esteem by the landscape and architecture professions and by the local community of East Balmain as well as the wider community of Sydney.

Iloura Reserve was listed on the New South Wales State Heritage Register on 29 November 2013 having satisfied the following criteria.

The place is important in demonstrating the course, or pattern, of cultural or natural history in New South Wales.

Illoura Reserve provides physical evidence of the 1970s practice of converting disused industrial waterfront sites into public parks. The reserve design inspired a change in public attitudes to public open space resulting in the desire for an alternative to the ordered neat environments common to public parks and heralded the beginning of the concept of ecologically sustainable design used in public projects. Illoura Reserve shows a high degree of creative or technical achievement for the 1970s. The design of the reserve was instrumental in changing the approach to design of harbourside parks and other public spaces. The Sydney Bush School approach to landscape design was indicative of the increased usage of indigenous plants and their introduction into mainstream gardens. Illoura Reserve influenced later generations of landscape designers in Australia. Illoura Reserve at Peacock Point is described by the Australian Institute of Landscape Architects to be a critical contribution to Australian landscape architecture.

The place has a strong or special association with a person, or group of persons, of importance of cultural or natural history of New South Wales's history.

The designer of Illoura Reserve, Bruce Mackenzie, is one of Australia's most influential landscape design practitioners and was a pioneer of the landscape movement known as the Sydney Bush School. The Oxford Companion to Australian Gardens (Aitken and Looker) describes Mackenzie as one of the foremost practitioners in the 1960s promoting an approach to landscape design which respected and harmonised with natural environments. The reserve is associated with Bruce Mackenzie and Associates and other design practices working at 7 Ridge Street, North Sydney who were pioneers of the Sydney Regional School of architecture and the Sydney Bush School of landscape architecture.

The place is important in demonstrating aesthetic characteristics and/or a high degree of creative or technical achievement in New South Wales.

Illoura Reserve is a seminal work of Australian landscape architecture demonstrating the Sydney Bush School which inspired environmentally conscious landscape design that made use of indigenous flora and was respectful of the special qualities existing in a place such as natural rock formations. The reserve has the special quality of feeling "natural" whilst in reality being a highly designed landscape. Illoura Reserve has compositional qualities such as its layout, transition between levels, views, grouping of trees, texture of ground surfaces such as stone paths and mulched beds, exposed rock and stone walls and planting zones indicative of natural bush, which combine to delight the senses of the park user and provide an escape from the city environment. The original construction of the reserve demonstrated how indigenous plants could be propagated and planted to inspire a feeling of the original natural bush setting of a place, at a time when indigenous plants were largely unavailable from nurseries. Through the use of recycled building materials, such as wharf timbers and sandstone blocks, the reserve design also interprets the former industrial character of the site and its harbour side location. Located on a promontory in East Balmain in a central location on Sydney Harbour the reserve is a landmark green space.

The place has strong or special association with a particular community or cultural group in New South Wales for social, cultural or spiritual reasons.

The landscape and architecture professions have very high degree of attachment for the place. The community has demonstrated its affection and attachment to the reserve in the successful lobbying to have 6–8 Weston Street adjacent to Illoura Reserve purchased by Council for use as an extension to the reserve.

The place possesses uncommon, rare or endangered aspects of the cultural or natural history of New South Wales.

Illoura Reserve has rarity value as a Sydney Bush School foreshore park on Sydney Harbour.

The place is important in demonstrating the principal characteristics of a class of cultural or natural places/environments in New South Wales.

Illoura Reserve is a fine example of the Sydney Bush School of landscape architectural design in New South Wales, which had a unique respect for the immediate environment and the characteristic spirit of the broad landscape beyond and found inspiration in the Hawkesbury Sandstone landscape type and its rock formations and flora predominant in the Sydney landscape. Illoura Reserve is important as the first example of the implementation of the Sydney Bush School landscape design philosophy in a public park on the foreshore of Sydney Harbour.
