= Shipwright's Arms Hotel =

Historic pub in New South Wales, Australia

Shipwright's Arms
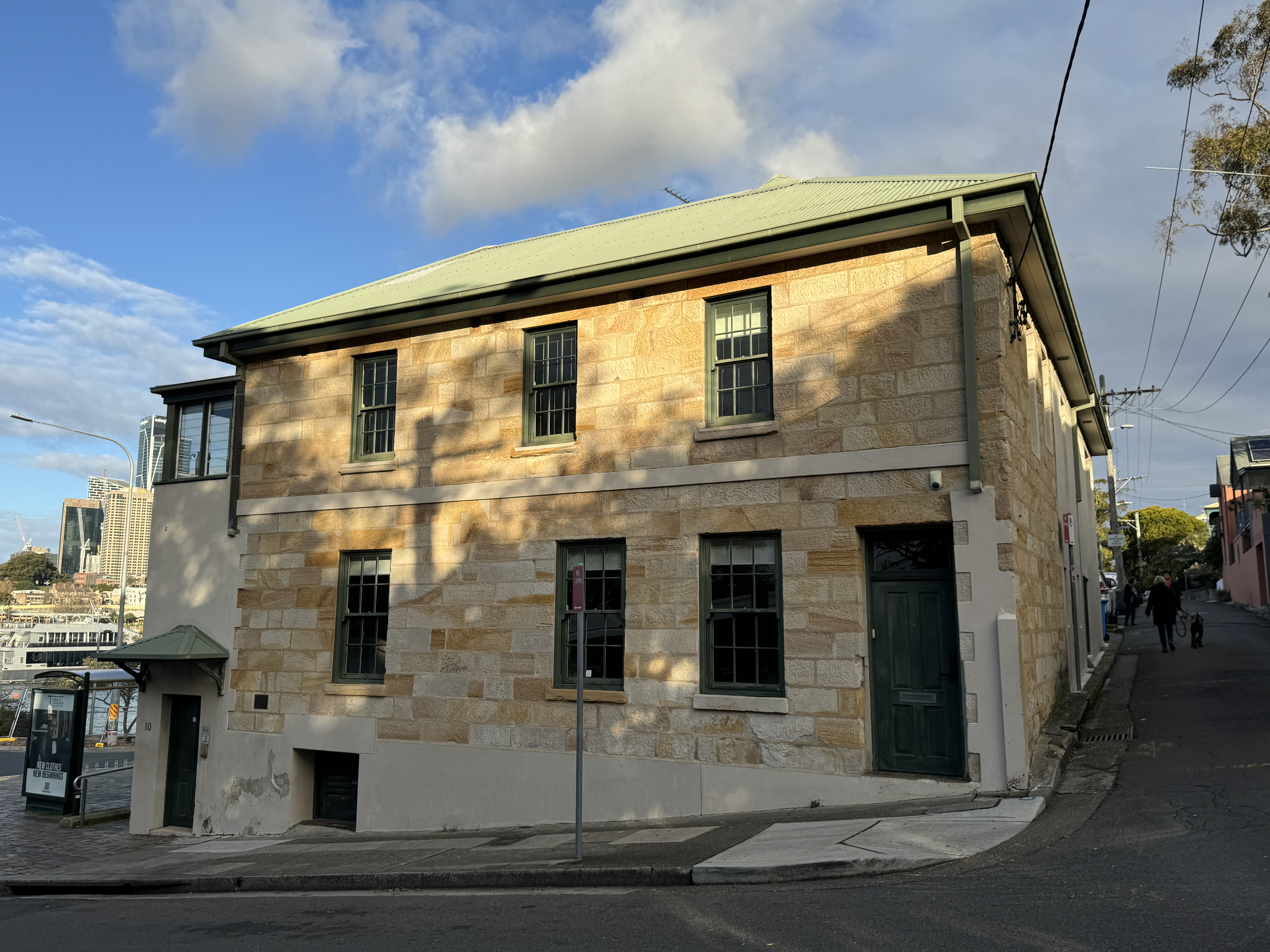
- Former Shipwright's Arms in 2024
- Interactive map of the Shipwright's Arms area
- Former names: Dolphin Hotel

General information
- Status: Completed
- Type: Australian pub (former); Luxury apartments (current)
- Location: 10 Darling Street, Balmain East, New South Wales, Australia
- Coordinates: 33°51′26″S 151°11′44″E

The Shipwright's Arms is an historic de-licensed pub located in Balmain East, a suburb in the inner west region of Sydney, in the state of New South Wales, Australia. The former pub looks out across Sydney Harbour to the Sydney Harbour Bridge and currently houses luxury apartments.

== History ==
As one of the first licensed establishments in Balmain, it was built by shipwright John Bell in 1841. In 1844 it was named the Dolphin Hotel when it was leased to publican William Walker, a former convict who had been transported from Birmingham, England at the age of 16 on 24 May 1827. It was claimed back in 1846 by John Bell and renamed The Shipwright's Arms. It was owned by Bell and his successors as owner of the adjacent Fenwick & Co Boat Store until sold to Miller's Brewery in 1950.

Although numbered as 10 Darling Street, it is effectively the first building in Balmain's main thoroughfare, and one of only a few waterside establishments. A former favourite haunt of watermen and surreptitious after-hours drinkers, its license was transferred to Miller's Hotel in Manly Vale in 1965.
