= Rosanna, Victoria =

Rosanna
- Suburb
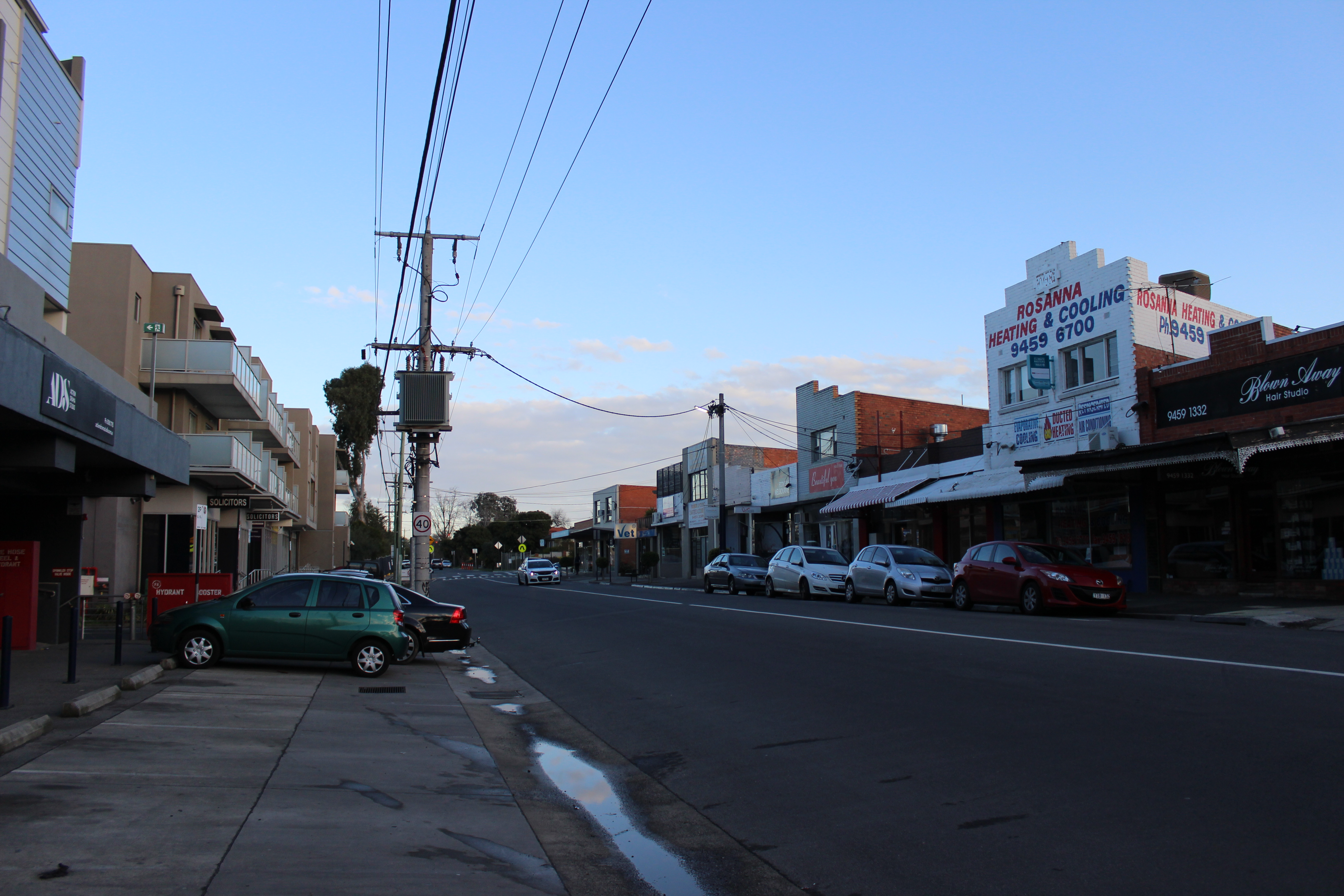
- Shops on Beetham Parade

- Interactive map of Rosanna
- Coordinates: 37.737°S 145.069°E
- Country: Australia
- State: Victoria
- City: Melbourne
- LGA: City of Banyule
- Location: 12 km (7.5 mi) from Melbourne

Government
  - State electorate: Ivanhoe
  - Federal division: Jagajaga

Area
  - Total: 3.7 km^{2} (1.4 sq mi)

Population
  - Total: 8,616 (2021 census)
  - Density: 2,329/km^{2} (6,030/sq mi)
- Postcode: 3084
Suburbs around Rosanna
Bundoora	Macleod	Yallambie
Heidelberg Heights	Rosanna	Viewbank
Heidelberg Heights	Heidelberg	Bulleen

Rosanna is a north-eastern suburb of Melbourne, Victoria, Australia, 12 km north-east from Melbourne's city centre, located within the City of Banyule local government area. Rosanna recorded a population of 8,616 at the 2021 census.

Rosanna is on the fringe of the Yarra Valley green belt. According to "Liveable Melbourne", a report published by The Age in 2019, Rosanna was ranked as Melbourne's 99th-most-liveable of 307 suburbs. The suburb was described as, "Rosanna, located 12 kilometres north-east of the CBD, is very accessible by bus and has decent access to trains. Among other strengths are the low crime and generous tree cover across hilly streets".

Rosanna has a recently-updated train station and while it does not have its own secondary schools, the suburb is zoned for a number of nearby public secondary schools.

== History ==
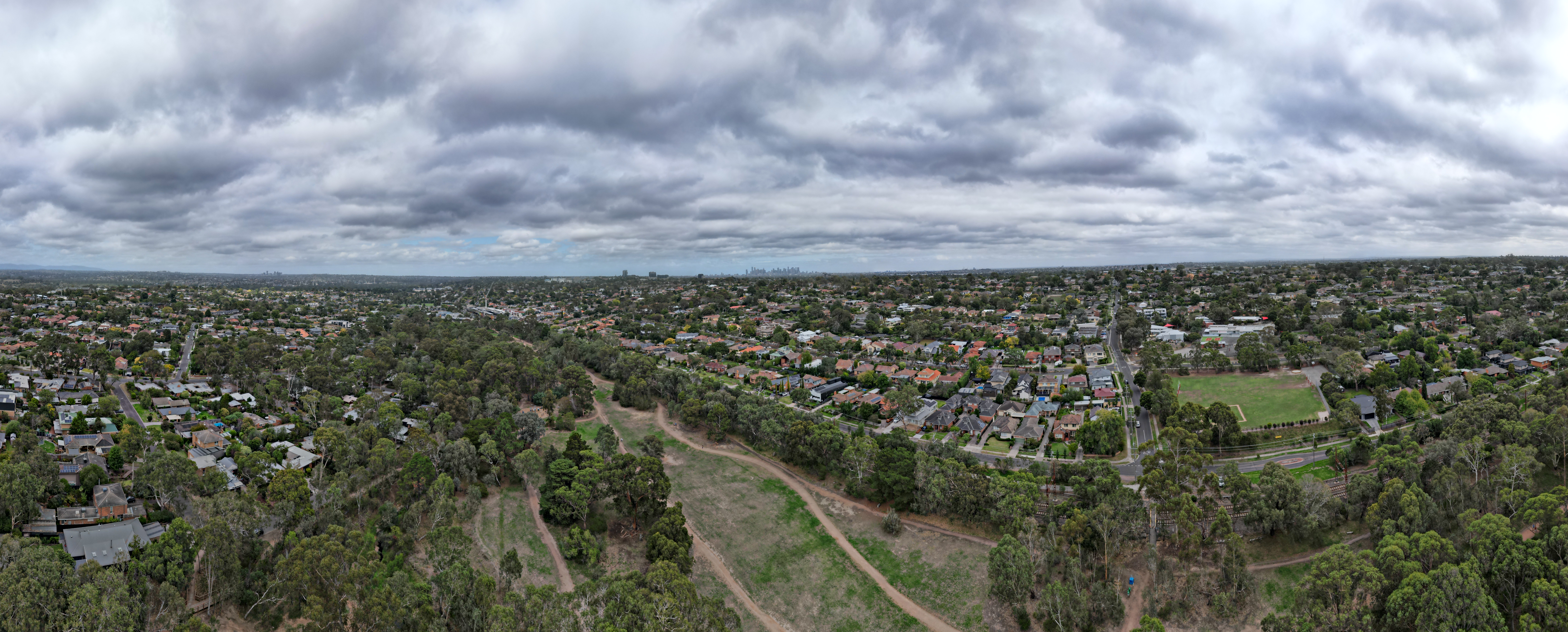
Rosanna Parklands, facing the Melbourne skyline

In 1838 Warringal Village was subdivided into nine portions that ranged in size from 2.6 to 5.2 square kilometres (1 to 2 sq mi), with one of the largest portions, number 5, purchased in 1840 by settler James Watson. He named the land Rose Anna Farm, after his wife, Elizabeth Anna Rose. However, in April 1843 Watson encountered financial difficulties, was charged with fraud and was successfully sued. His company became insolvent and he was subsequently forced to subdivide and sell lots of the farm. Up until the early 1890s, four-fifths of the farm remained as an intact estate. However, in 1901 the Hurstbridge railway line was extended from Heidelberg to run to Rosanna, and in 1902 was further extended through to Eltham. This led to further subdivision and sale of lots.

The Rosanna Post Office opened on 12 March 1914, closed in 1917 and reopened in 1926.

In 1949 the shops along Lower Plenty Road, west of the railway crossing, consisted of a fuel merchant, post office, storekeeper, fruiterer, butcher and an estate agent. Numerous houses were being built, and two dairy farmers were east of the crossing. Ten years later there were 24 shops, including clothing and homewares. The growth of the local shopping centre signified the housing growth. In the next ten years housing spread outward from the railway line, and a three-fold increase in rates made the golf club move eastwards by three kilometres (two miles).

=== Heritage listing ===
The following place in Rosanna is listed on the Victorian Heritage Register:

- Elliston Estate, a residential estate named in honour of Ellis Stones, who, aged 71 years, was instrumental in the landscape design of the estate and the adjacent Rosanna Parklands

=== Other historical buildings ===
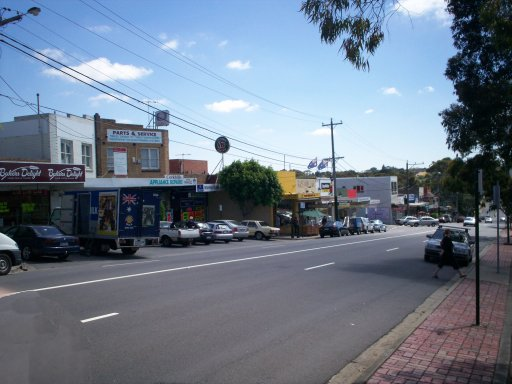
Shops on Lower Plenty Road

The former fire station at 230 Lower Plenty Road, is a late work by Percy Edgar Everett. The former fire station was built in 1953 and is an example of the work of Everett whose contribution to the design of public buildings in the Inter-War period was exemplary. The former fire station is sited at an angle to the corner and is composed of a series of pavilions with flat roofs. The central part of the building was designed as accommodation for the fire trucks, has a raised roof and two sets of timber doors between rounded concrete pillars. The remainder of the building has a lower profile and contains accommodation for offices and a residence. Of cream face brick with timber framed modern windows, the building appears highly intact despite being adapted for a new use as a neighbourhood house. The building is composed of several parts with discrete low pitched roofs, and this combined with the angled siting give a very distinctive appearance to the building which is still highly intact. The building has some social significance as a fire station for over thirty years before adapting to a new community use as a neighbourhood house.

The Joseph Simpson house at 35 Douglas Street was built in 1958 for Simpson, designed by architect Robin Boyd, one of the leading exponents of modern architecture in Melbourne during the 1950s and 1960s. This house is a representative example of the small residences built by Boyd for private clients where he provided open plan living and passive solar designs at a time when this was rare in mainstream building. It is well designed for the sloping site and incorporates a lower ground floor at the rear, however this has been altered by additional glazing. The Joseph Simpson house is a relatively intact example of Boyd's design work and displays many of the typical features of his work.

== Demographics ==
According to 2021 Census, 71.5% of Rosanna's population reported they were born in Australia. The next country of birth top responses were China (excludes SARs and Taiwan) & Italy both 3.2%, India 2.8%, England 2.5% & New Zealand 1.4%.

=== Newspapers ===
The first known record of a newspaper in the Heidelberg area was 26 March 1897. This publication, known as the Heidelberg News and Diamond Creek Chronicle, was a four-page broadsheet with most of page one dedicated to advertisements.

The masthead has taken many forms over the years. Of particular note was when the City of Heidelberg was proclaimed in 1934 and the paper became The News - The Newspaper of the City of Heidelberg.

In 1949 the paper took its current tabloid format and incorporated the Shire of Eltham into its masthead; to become The News - The Newspaper of the City of Heidelberg and the Shire of Eltham.

On 12 November 1958, the first tabloid edition of the Heidelberger was published and the following year The News became the Rosanna and Diamond Valley News.

After 43 years as the Heidelberger, a new look paper emerged under the banner of the Heidelberg Leader on 28 May 2001, introducing a more contemporary style. The Suburb was described as: "Rosanna, located 12 kilometres north-east of the CBD, is very accessible by bus and has decent access to trains. Among other strengths are the low crime and generous tree cover across hilly streets".

== Transport ==
Rosanna's main arterial roads are Lower Plenty Road and Rosanna Road.

The suburb is served by the Rosanna railway station on the Hurstbridge railway line. In 2018 the station received a major upgrade to remove the level crossing and runs many express services to the CBD.

Rosanna is served by two bus routes:

Route 513 - Eltham - Glenroy via Greensborough or Lower Plenty

Route 517 - Northland SC - St Helena via Greensborough & Viewbank

Both these bus routes stop at the Rosanna railway station.

== Facilities ==
Rosanna Library is managed by Yarra Plenty Regional Library. In December 2020 Banyule City Council entered an agreement with Woolworths who owns adjoining land. The new library will be a three-story building with expanded children's area, co-working and study spaces, community meeting rooms and other services and spaces. The redevelopment of Rosanna library is scheduled to finish by the end of 2025. A pop-up library is located at 56 Beetham Parade.

The Rosanna Fire Station Community House provides opportunities for all to learn, teach, make friends and give mutual support in an ethnically diverse, comfortable, accepting and co-operative environment. The Rotary Club of Rosanna District Inc installed a street library outside the fire station community house in 2019.

== Education ==
Rosanna includes the following schools:

- Banyule Primary School – Located on Banyule Road, opened in 1960
- Rosanna Golf Links Primary School – Located on Interlaken Parade, opened in 1956
- Rosanna Primary School – Located on Grandview Grove, opened in 1940
- St Martin of Tours – Located on Silk Street, opened in 1958
- Viewbank College – Located on Warren Road, created from the merger of Rosanna East High School and Banyule High School in 1994

== Recreation ==
- Athletics – The Rosanna Little Athletics Club, established in 1970, provides athletics activities for local 6- to 16-year-olds; the club being part of the Diamond Valley Little Athletics Centre in Greensborough
- Australian rules football – Macleod Football Club competes in the Northern Football League and are based at De Winton Park in the suburb
- Golf – The Rosanna Golf Club is located on Cleveland Avenue in the neighbouring suburb of Lower Plenty
- Lawn bowling - The Rosanna Bowling Club was formed on 26 May 1960, and as a result secured a 40-year lease, in 1961, over four blocks of land with a frontage totalling 200 feet at 3 – 11 Strasbourg Road, Rosanna 3084. In the same year, 100 men and 60 ladies were signed as foundation members. In 1962 twelve rinks on a new green were opened by the Vice President of the then RVBA, and the first building was completed for the club. 1963 saw the first pennant match being played.

== Notable residents ==
- Mark Bresciano – soccer player
- Antoinette Halloran – operatic soprano
- Jim May – chemical engineer and businessman
- Phil Rudd – drummer for AC/DC

== See also ==
- City of Heidelberg – Rosanna was previously within this former local government area.
