= Ellis Stones =

Australian landscape architect and conservationist (1895–1975)

- Born: Ellis Andrew Stones; 1 October 1895; Wodonga, Australia
- Died: 9 April 1975 (aged 79); Ivanhoe, Victoria, Australia
- Education: Moonee Ponds West Primary School
- Occupation: Landscape architect
- Known for: Plumbers and Gasfitters Employees Union Building; Winter Park cluster housing; Elliston Estate
- Spouse: Olive Doyle (m. 1922)
- Children: 4
- Parents: Thomas James Stones (father); Hannah May, née Downs (mother)

Ellis Andrew Stones (1 October 1895 – 9 April 1975) was an Australian landscape architect of private and public gardens—many displaying naturalistic rockwork—and a conservationist whose work and ideas influenced approaches to public landscaping in Australia. Based in Melbourne, Victoria, he was an early proponent of the use of Australian native plants and one of the founding fathers of the Australian landscaping style.

== Early career ==
Ellis Stones was born in Wodonga, Victoria. His father was Thomas James Stones a customs officer, born in Victoria. His mother was Hannah May, née Downs, also born in Victoria. He grew up in Essendon, attended Moonee Ponds West Primary School, and worked with the Victorian Railways as an apprentice carriage builder. He married Olive Doyle in 1922 and they had a son, who died in his first year, and three daughters.

During World War I, he was a rower in the first boat of the second wave of the landing at Gallipoli on 25 April 1915, and took a bullet in his left knee, an injury which was to cause him lifelong pain. During World War II, Stones worked in the Volunteer Defence Corps and the Civil Constructional Corps.

After World War II, he returned to work as a carpenter and, later, a builder, eventually living and working at Avenel in country Victoria. The Depression brought him and his family back to Melbourne, where he took on whatever work he could find (including repairing broken window glass), and eventually settled in Ivanhoe. Working on a house in Heidelberg in 1934-35, he volunteered to build a stone wall for its landscape designer Edna Walling. Impressed by his natural aptitude she employed him again on many other jobs as he gradually established his own practice as a constructor and designer of gardens.

== Landscape architecture career ==
Stones collaborated for many years with Walling, constructing many of the rock outcrops, walls and ponds in the gardens she designed. Among the gardens in which he did rock work for Walling were:

- Donaldson and Anderson gardens in Heidelberg and the Marshall garden in nearby Eaglemont
- Beattie, Darling and Anderson gardens in Toorak
- Lewis garden in Malvern
- 'Kildrummie', the Carnegie garden in Holbrook, New South Wales
- 'Hillsborough' or 'Silver Birches' garden in Balwyn
- gardens in Benalla, Skipton and Olinda

In Australian Home Beautiful of December 1938 Walling wrote:

"It is a rare thing this gift for placing stones and strange that a man possessing it should bear the name Stones... Lovely as formal gardens can be, it is these informal schemes, in which boulders form so important a part, that appeal so tremendously... they give us the atmosphere of the country, and the refreshment of mind derived from such".

— Edna Walling, Australian Home Beautiful, 1938.

Stones' inspiration for garden landscaping came from the natural world. He wrote in the introduction to his book Australian Landscape Design:

" ... more can be learnt by observing nature than through any other form of teaching. When you see pleasing contours with perhaps an attractive grouping of trees, ask yourself why they please you. It may be their texture or perhaps their shape, or a wandering track which may give special interest to the landscape. Look for the reason. It may be that the track winds around a tree which casts shadows on the path, or past an outcrop of boulders."

— Ellis Stones, Australian Landscape Design, 1971.

In her foreword to The Ellis Stones Garden Book published in 1976 shortly after his death, Thistle Harris elaborated:

"Ellis Stones abhorred geometrical patterns as much as does nature on a grand scale, and straight paths, trimmed borders and serried ranks of plants are never to be found in his gardens. Curving paths leading to forever; informal clumps of plants, bending intimately towards each other; lichen-covered rocks of geological antiquity—these things distinguish his designs."

— Thistle Harris, The Ellis Stones Garden Book, 1976.

The second principle which guided Stones' work was the idea that gardens must be designed for the people who use them. This struck a chord with writer Anne Latreille as she researched his life and work for her book ‘The Natural Garden’ (1990). Latreille noted how Stones would start by considering the owners' way of life including likely changing needs over time. He tried to include private, sheltered spaces to sit outdoors and he was cognisant of providing beautiful outlooks from indoors as well as particular spots in the garden.

In addition to creating many hundreds of gardens throughout Melbourne, through his writings (for instance as an occasional then regular contributor to Australian Home Beautiful and later with his books), Stones must have influenced hundreds of thousands of home gardeners. His 1950s plant nursery in Lower Heidelberg Road helped to make native plants more available to the general public, and allowed Stones to provide brief advice to a large number of customers who had admired his work in others' gardens or who read his articles but could not afford to engage him.

Stones' specific advice on the design of home gardens was distilled into the following phrase: "Think of a courtyard as a room without a ceiling; use timber for its beauty as well as its utility; no garden is too small to have water in it; when placing rocks, bury more underground than you will see above ground; and a garden should always have a sitting spot." His employees also recalled him frequently commenting, "when in doubt, plant spiraea!"

Stones inspired a whole generation of younger garden designers. He was a foundation lecturer in the landscape design course at RMIT. Rob Grant and David Leech, employees of Stone, went on to develop successful landscape businesses. Leech practised in Far North Queensland and his work is evident in parks and gardens in the Eltham area. New South Wales landscaper designer Michael Bligh's career in design was prompted by coming across Stones' book while looking for something to read on his way home on the train. While not formally trained himself, Stones supported the establishment of the Australian Institute of Landscape Architects, and became one of its first affiliate members, and was appointed as a fellow of the Institute in 1975. Among others, he trained landscape designer, Bev Hanson and Gordon Ford, a pioneer of the bush garden concept. Ford's influence can be seen through the work of his former employee, contemporary landscape architect, Sam Cox. Stones was also a major influence on John Fenton, one of Australia's foremost ecological farmers.

=== Commissions ===
Over his long and productive working life, Stones was involved in creating several hundred gardens around Melbourne and beyond. Beginning with smaller specific elements such as rock outcrops and pools (especially for Walling) his body of work includes the following:

Year	Name of garden	Suburb	References
1935	Rockwork for Walling-designed Darling garden	Toorak	
1933 to 1939	Side garden at Ringland Anderson’s Walling-designed ‘Churston’ garden	Toorak	
1938 & late 1940s/early 1950s	Detail work 'Miegunyah' Grimwade garden	Toorak	
1938	Flack garden	South Yarra	
1945	Rockwork and timber studio for the Walling-designed Marshall garden	Eaglemont	
1945	Walters garden	Malvern	
1946	'Strathfieldsaye'	Gippsland	
1949	Thornthwaite garden	Ocean Grove	
1949 to 1954	Bush garden around Downing/LeGallienne mud brick house by Alistair Knox (with Gordon Ford)	Eltham	
1949	Walters garden	Narre Warren	
1940s, late	'Culraven' Ringland Anderson country-house	Olinda	
1940s, late	garden	Heathmont	
1940s, late	garden for AVJennings house	Balwyn	
1950	'Padthaway' Lawson garden	Keith, South Australia	
1951	'Mt Pleasant'	Eltham	
1952	'Stella Park' Pyke sisters' gardens	Templestowe	
1953-54	Hawthorne garden	Lilydale	
1953-54	'Netherplace' Landdale family garden	Riverina District	
1953-54	'Bridge House' (by Robin Boyd)	Toorak, in a creek valley	
1954	Rundle garden	Eltham	
1950s, mid	'Schubert Nursery'	Noble Park	
1956 to 1958	Stone garden (house by Robin Boyd)	Ivanhoe, near Lower Heidelberg Road cutting	
1957	'Glenara' Rundle garden near Deep Creek	Bulla	
1957	garden around houses by Alistair Knox on subdivision of Grassick's 'Appledore' (Note: May have been involved with Walling in c. 1945, as the 'Appledore' garden is contiguous with the Marshall garden.)	Eaglemont	
1957	rockwork and paving for Bates Smart McCutcheon headquarters (for John Stephens)	Melbourne, St Kilda Road	
1958	Zelman Cowen garden	Kew	
1959	Hawthorne garden	South Yarra	
1959	Clemson garden (house by Robin Boyd)	Kew	
1950s, late	forecourts ICI House and Hume House (designed by John Stevens)	East Melbourne	
1959-60	Mason Firth McCutcheon (office building by Bob Eggleston)	Moorabbin	
1960-61	Garden house designed by Robin Boyd	Berwick	
1960-61	Watsonia Army Camp	Watsonia	
1960-61	Judge Book Memorial Village	Eltham	
1961	Cox garden (house by Peter Hooks)	Fairfield	
1961 to 1964	Baitz garden	Canterbury	
1960s, early	Osborne garden, Jepp garden	Warrandyte	
1961	Dickie garden, Fairview St, with Mervyn Davis	Hawthorn	
1961	Dellas Avenue (Yarragunyah)	Templestowe	
?	forecourt Hume House, designed by John Stevens	Melbourne, William Street	
1962	garden for former employee Louise McDonald, née Landale	Millicent, South Australia	
1963	pool at Chris Cross garden supplies outlet	Deepdene	
1963	Hawthorne garden	Hawthorn	
1965	landscaping above underground laboratory housing CSIRO's division of physical chemistry	Monash University	
1965	Rockpool garden at historic Como House	South Yarra	
1965	Garden (house by Peter Hooks)	Pascoe Vale South	
1965	McIlwraith garden	Violet Town	
1967	'Mogolimby' (house designed by Graeme Gunn)	Euroa	
1967	Michael McCoy memorial playground	Footscray	
1968	Lady and Sir Ian McLennan garden	Narre Warren	
1968	Merchant Builders housing, Yuille Street	Brighton	
1968	playgrounds for disabled children at Churinga and Yooralla	Greensborough and Balwyn	
1968	wooden playground, Wilson Park	Ivanhoe	
1969	BHP research laboratories	Clayton	
1969-70	Molesworth St townhouses (by Graeme Gunn)	Kew	
1970	playground, Travancore Children's home	Flemington	
1970	Elliston Estate	Rosanna	
1971	Carnegie courtyard garden	Malvern	
1971	playground, North Richmond Housing Estate, for (then) Housing Commission of Victoria	Richmond	
1972	Garden for 'Saintonge' Molesworth Street (by Charles Duncan)	Kew	
1972	Landscaping, Karwarra native plant nursery	Kalorama	
1973	Rock garden	University of Melbourne, Parkville	
1970s, early	Townhouses by architect Graeme Gunn, Kensington Road	South Yarra	
1970 to 1974	Winter Park development by architect Graeme Gunn	Doncaster	

Other commissions included a garden in Balwyn for Alan Blazey, chairman of garden products firm Hortico in the mid-1950s, a garden in Strathmore and playgrounds and gardens at Invercargill in New Zealand.

=== Elliston Estate ===
Merchant Builders Pty Ltd was an initiative of Melbourne businessman David Yencken. After discussions with prominent Melbourne architect Robin Boyd and his young employee Graeme Gunn, Yencken (with timber merchant John Ridge) established the company with the vision of providing architect-designed houses at project home prices. Gunn was the architect-in-charge, and Ellis Stones – then aged 71 – took on its landscape and garden design. Eventually Merchant Builders assembled a team of architects to design fifty basic house plans. The architects consulted included Gunn, Charles Duncan, Daryl Jackson and Evan Walker, and McGlashan Everist.

Stones was commissioned to undertake landscaping in many of the Merchant home developments. Elliston Estate was one of the best-known Merchant Builders home developments, named after Stones himself. Swamped by protests from local residents when the Rosanna Golf Club was to be subdivided for housing, Heidelberg City Council agreed to buy the golf course, retain half of it for a park and sell the rest to Merchant Builders for on-selling to the public. Stones advised on landscaping the park and developing the streetscapes and gardens so that 'gardens streets and park' would 'flow into and through each other'. Elliston, added to the Victorian Heritage Register, includes Bachli, Cremin, Ferrier, Pickworth, Hartley, Nagle and Devlin Courts; Stanton, Crampton, Phillips and Von Nida Crescents; the west side of Finlayson Street; and Thompson Drive, all in Rosanna.

=== Environmentalism ===
Stones was deeply concerned about the destruction of the Australian landscape. In the introduction to his book Australian Garden Design, he wrote:

"Before the commencement of any major project that encroaches on the landscape there should be formed a panel consisting of persons representing every profession concerned with the project, to discuss and advise on the best means of carrying out the project with the least damage to the landscape. A landscape architect should certainly be included in any such panel, as he is in other countries which are deeply concerned about the preservation of their natural flora and fauna." "The ideal way to design a garden is in consultation with the architect or builder, before operations have commenced, so that the building may be sited in a way that will give plenty of scope for the garden, preserve some of the existing trees if the area is a wooded one, or emphasise any other strong features that may be evident in the natural contours."

— Ellis Stones, Australian Garden Design, 1971.

Stones was a major influence on the landscaping of public places in Australia. In 1964 he assisted the Blackburn Tree Preservation Society to develop a proposal for staggered planting of clumps of Australian plants both within the median strip and either side of Springvale Road. The Nunawading Council, though initially resistant to the proposal, was eventually persuaded. Newsletters from the Society document that planting undertaken in 1965 in a trial stretch from Whitehorse Road to Canterbury Road was later extended south to Waverley Road. In 1974, Stones designed a section of the median strip in Canterbury Road from east of View Road, Vermont to the intersection of Boronia and Mitcham Roads. This project used rock outcrops and low bluestone walls and is still visible when driving west along Canterbury Road before the intersection with Mitcham and Boronia Roads. The retention and supplementation of native vegetation championed by Stones and the Blackburn Tree Preservation Society has become the norm for median strips and roadside planting throughout Victoria.

Stones was an outspoken critic of the Melbourne and Metropolitan Board of Works (MMBW), lamenting the destruction and degradation of the Yarra River environs and creeks throughout suburban Melbourne. He was the first president of the Ivanhoe River Parklands Protection League established in 1955 to prevent the destruction of Chelsworth Park. He served as a committee member for the Save the Yarra League and also assisted the Yarra Valley Freeway Action Group. For the Tullamarine Freeway he wrote to Lord Mayor Ron Walker late in 1974 suggesting "the whole length... as a beautiful bushland setting, with the statuesque river red gums a main feature... to welcome visitors to Australia."

The last project by Stones, in 1975, was landscaping Salt Creek in the Rosanna Parklands, approved by his former adversary the MMBW. Described by Latreille:

"Peter Glass visited Ellis on site the day before he died and found him 'leaping around those rocks like an antelope'. He came home for dinner on the night of 9 April, tired and happy. 'Oh I've had a good day' he said to (wife) Olive. 'There's a boy on the job who really understands what I'm talking about.' He went for a short lie-down before the evening meal and did not wake. He died in harness, quickly and quietly, as he wished it."

— Anne Latreille, 1990.

Not long after his death, the MMBW preserved a large amount of land along the Yarra Valley in a series of metropolitan parks, landscaped with native vegetation exactly as he would have wanted.

== Awards and recognition ==
Stones posthumously received the Royal Australian Institute of Architect's Robin Boyd Environmental Award bronze medal in 1975. A memorial plaque honouring his work can be found in a rock garden in Chelsworth Park near his former home in Ivanhoe. The rock garden he designed near the staff car park at The University of Melbourne bears another memorial plaque. In Burnley Gardens, the Ellis Stones rockery was created to honour his contribution to landscape design in Australia.

The Ellis Stones Memorial Award is offered biennially to a landscape student for an outstanding piece of research.

== Published works ==
- Stones, Ellis, 1971, Australian Garden Design, South Melbourne, with photographs by Ted Rotherham
- Stones, Ellis, 1976, The Ellis Stones Garden Book, Nelson Australia, West Melbourne
- Stones, Ellis, unpublished manuscript Priority Landscaping
