= Elliston Estate =

Heritage-listed real estate subdivision in Melbourne, Victoria, Australia

- Location of the estate in Greater Metropolitan Melbourne

General information
- Status: Completed
- Type: Real estate subdivision
- Architectural style: Garden suburb; Modernist
- Location: Rosanna, City of Banyule, Melbourne, Victoria, Australia
- Coordinates: 37°44′20″S 145°04′06″E
- Named for: Ellis Stones
- Year built: 1969–1975
- Completed: c.1975; 51 years ago

Technical details
- Grounds: 21 ha (53 acres) (in 1969)

Design and construction
- Architects: Graeme Gunn; Charles Duncan; Daryl Jackson; Evan Walker; McGlashan Everist
- Developer: Merchant Builders
- Other designers: Ellis Stones (landscape design)

Victorian Heritage Register
- Official name: Elliston Estate (Merchant Builders) and Rosanna Parklands
- Type: Registered place
- Criteria: a., d.
- Designated: 11 June 2026
- Reference no.: H2454
- Heritage overlay no.: HO127
- Categories: Parks, Gardens and Trees; Residential buildings (private)

The Elliston Estate, or more simply, Elliston, is a garden suburb real estate subdivision located in Rosanna, in the City of Banyule, in the northern suburbs of Melbourne, in Victoria, Australia. The estate comprises houses, streets, and parks located on Bachli, Cremin, and Ferrier Courts; Von Nida Crescent; Finlayson Street; and Lower Plenty Road, in Rosanna.

Developed from 1969 on the traditional lands of the Wurundjeri people, the estate was added to the Victorian Heritage Register on 11 June 2026 in recognition of its historical and architectural significance; and was also added to a non-statutory list by the City of Banyule on an unknown date. (Note: The area added by the City of Banyule is a little wider than the Victorian Heritage Register area; and incorporated the additional areas of Pickworth, Hartley, Nagle and Devlin Courts; Stanton, Crampton, and Phillips Crescents; and Thompson Drive, in Rosanna.)

The estate was named in honour of Ellis Stones, who, aged 71 years, was instrumental in the landscape design of the estate and the adjacent Rosanna Parklands.

== History ==
=== Early development ===
James Watson purchased Crown Portion Five in the Parish of Keelbundora in 1840, which became the Rosanna Estate. From 1911, the Yarra Yarra Golf Club, known as the Rosanna Golf Links from 1936, were established on part of the estate, to the immediate east of the Hurstbridge railway line. In 1961, the golf club's lease expired. The post-war residential boom in the area inspired Bruce Treganowan, the golf course's owner, to propose a residential subdivision of the site. Heidelberg City Council received opposition from the local community to the proposal and the Council purchased the golf course site in 1968, developed half of the site as a residential subdivision, and retained the other half as public parkland.

=== Merchant Builders ===
Post-war suburban development in metropolitan Melbourne was generally characterised by the rapid expansion of single dwellings on quarter-acre blocks in the middle suburbs and new greenfield sites in the outer suburbs. From c. 1960, figures such as Robin Boyd criticised the ‘uglification’ of the Australian countryside and new suburbs, most notably in his book, The Australian Ugliness, published in 1960. In the view of critics of conventional suburban development, the local climate and landscape were often ignored in the planning of the suburbs, and the houses were designed in a mix of styles with no coherence.

In 1965, David Yencken AO, a builder and businessman, together with timber merchant, John Ridge, founded Merchant Builders, with the aim of providing an alternative to standard suburban residential development. Its approach used the project house model in which homebuyers could select an architect-designed residence of standardised design, often marketed via a display home. Merchant Builders recognised an opportunity for good-quality, medium-cost housing and promoted a design approach that integrated architecture, landscape, and interiors. Central to its principal design philosophy was integration of residential development with the surrounding environment. Employing some of Victoria's leading architects, houses were designed along Modernist principles and the firm became known for its low-profile residences in a palette of natural materials, set in landscapes of native planting. Although homebuyers could vary standardised plans, a degree of consistency in housing design was emphasised. Merchant Builders also promoted energy-efficient and passive energy features.

Merchant Builders was at its most prolific in the 1960s and 1970s, and Elliston Estate was the largest of the firm's housing developments. The Elliston Estate project was followed by the commencement of its Winter Park cluster housing project – a subdivision in Doncaster that comprised twenty detached houses constructed between 1970 and 1974, designed principally by Graeme Gunn AM. Winter Park received a citation from the Royal Australian Institute of Architects (RAIA) in 1975 and was also added to the Victorian Heritage Register. Merchant Builders received numerous other awards before disbanding in the 1980s, including the RAIA Victorian Chapter Bronze Medals (1970 and 1978), the Robin Boyd Environmental Award (1972) for the firm's ‘decade of outstanding contributions to housing development in Melbourne’, the Herald-HIA housing prize (1978) and the Australian Design Council Award (1982). Merchant Builders was one of the most influential building companies in Victoria in the post-war era.

=== Real estate subdivision ===
In February 1969, the Council sold 21 hectares (53 acres) to Merchant Builders to develop the land as a residential estate. Merchant Builders announced their project ‘Elliston’, with the housing to be developed over a three-year period, including underground power lines, individual courtyards, landscaped gardens, and an abundance of natural parkland. The design team for the Estate consisted of the following renowned architects of the period: Graeme Gunn, Charles Duncan, Daryl Jackson AO, Evan Walker AO, and McGlashan Everist. Ellis Stones, a notable landscape designer, was responsible for the overall landscape design concept for the estate as well as consulting with individual house owners on detailed designs of gardens. Stones was also responsible for the landscape design of the adjacent Rosanna Parklands in harmony with the estate.

Each architect designed a series of at least four houses in order that a wide choice of house designs be given to the prospective homebuyer. The plan could be modified, altered or extended to suit the homebuyer's requirements. By November 1969, a display area and site office were completed within the southern portion of the estate.

In 1971, Merchant Builders decided to cease involvement at Elliston, with housing that was underway or subject to contract completed by c. 1972. The original part of Elliston Estate developed by Merchant Builders comprised Bachli, Cremin and Ferrier courts and Von Nida Crescent, at the southern end of the estate. The remaining residential lots were developed by private homeowners and builders. Merchant Builders also developed areas of Pickworth Court and Finlayson Street to the north of Von Nida Crescent. Nonetheless, development within this northern extent became more diffused. Aerial photographs show the rapid development of Elliston Estate in 1972–1975, with the broader subdivision largely developed by various owners by 1975.

== Description ==
=== Residential estate ===
The Elliston Estate is a post-war project-housing estate developed in the late 1960s and early 1970s by the influential building company, Merchant Builders. The project received wide industry acclaim at the time. The architects employed natural stained finishes, pale or clinker bricks, and heavy exposed beams throughout the estate, allowing the residences to integrate with the surrounding natural landscape. The estate sold slowly and only approximately seventy of the projected 250-300 houses were completed by Merchant Builders. Some speculated that the home-buying public may have found the houses too homogenous for their taste and struggled to appreciate Merchant Builders' design principles.

Landscaping of the estate and adjacent Rosanna Parklands was designed by renowned landscape designer, Ellis Stones, from 1969 to 1972. According to Stones, his design philosophy was:

Existing trees in the estate will be left wherever possible ... and any new trees planted will be native Australian trees. It will be a very informal design with no formal flower beds. The landscape must be strong and simple with one continuous flowing feeling.

— Ellis Stones

In February 1970, a house in the estate was awarded with the title "House of the Week" by The Australian Women's Weekly.

=== Parklands ===
Rosanna Parklands
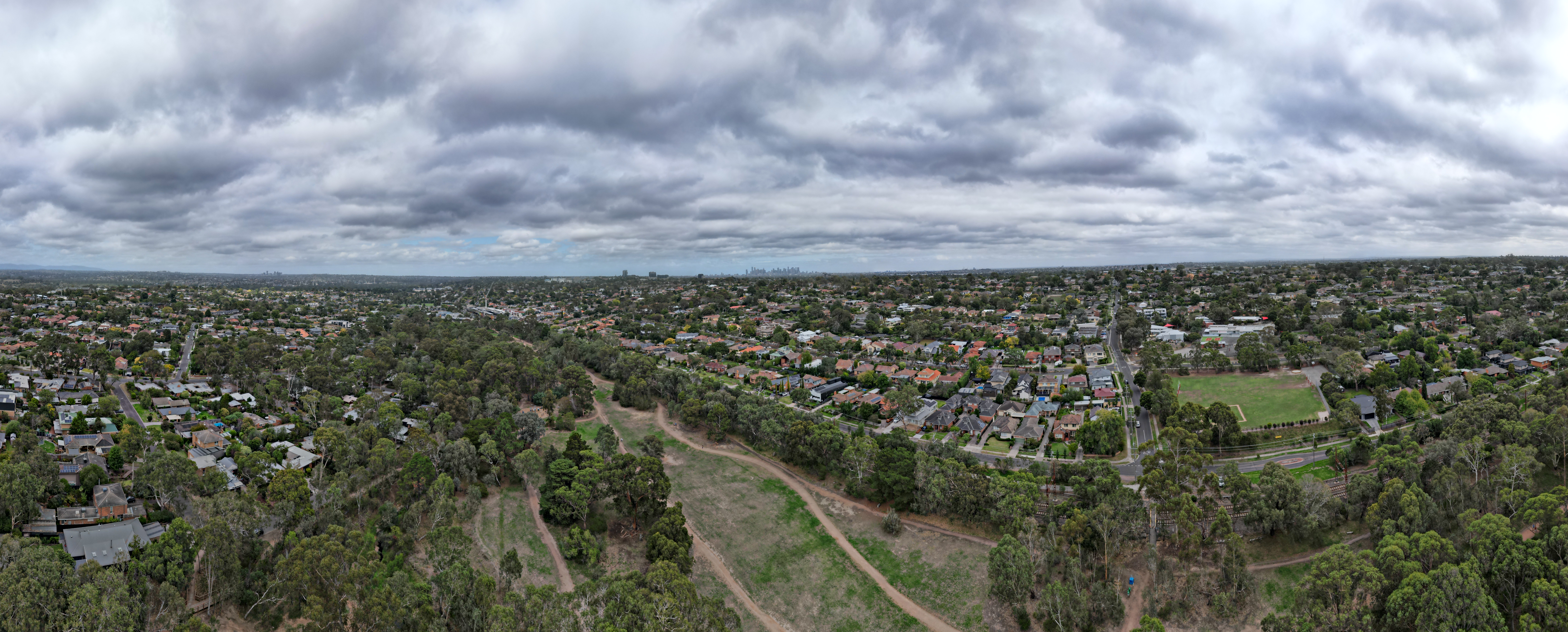
- The parklands looking towards the Melbourne city centre, in 2025
- Type: Nature reserve
- Area: 25 ha (62 acres)
- Established: 1969; 57 years ago
- Designer: Ellis Stones
- Owner: City of Banyule
- Status: Open to the public

The Rosanna Parklands is a 25-hectare (62-acre) nature reserve that was developed as part of the residential estate, designed by Stones. The reserve's vegetation communities include grassy woodlands, and Red River Gum woodlands, slopes and terraces, with remnant bushland areas that have a diverse mix of indigenous species. Areas of natural interest include the Davies Street wetlands and the northern grasslands where indigenous grasses and herbs have been reintroduced. Four species of frogs have been heard calling in the wetlands, including the common froglet, eastern banjo frog/pobblebonk, spotted marsh frog and the southern brown tree frog. Many birds and reptiles use the reserve for shelter and food, including yellow-tailed black cockatoos.

== See also ==
- Architecture of Melbourne
- List of places on the Victorian Heritage Register in the City of Banyule
- Parks and gardens of Melbourne
