= Fenwick & Co Boat Store =

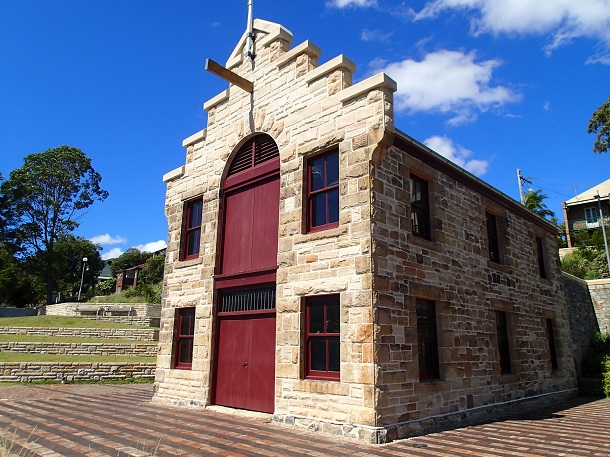

- Location within Sydney Location within Australia
- 33.8573°S 151.1957°E
- Location: 2-8 Weston Street, Balmain East, Inner West Council, Sydney, New South Wales, Australia

History
- Built: 1875–1885

Site notes
- Owner: Inner West Council

New South Wales Heritage Register
- Official name: Fenwick & Co Boat Store; Fenwick & Co. Building; Bell's Store
- Type: state heritage (built)
- Designated: 9 June 2000
- Reference no.: 1396
- Type: Warehouse/storage area
- Category: Transport - Water

Fenwick & Co Boat Store is a heritage-listed former shipwright's yard at 2-8 Weston Street, Balmain East, New South Wales, a suburb of Sydney, Australia. It was built from 1875 to 1885. It is also known as Fenwick & Co. Building and Bell's Store. The property is owned by the Inner West Council. It was added to the New South Wales State Heritage Register on 9 June 2000.

== History ==
The site of 2-8 Weston Street was part of the land granted to William Balmain in 1800. Prior to returning to England, Balmain transferred the land to John Gilchrist. Gilchrist subsequently subdivided the land and in 1836 auctioneer George William Paul purchased Lot 4 and Lot 6.

Paul subdivided his purchase and the future site of Fenwick's business became Lots 3 and 4. These were sold to Harry Lambert Brabagan in July 1840. The following month Brabagan resold this land to the shipwright John Bell.

Soon after purchasing the land John Bell built a residence on the corner of Darling and Weston Streets. In 1844 Bell leased his home to William Walker, who opened it as the Dolphin Hotel (later the Shipwright's Arms Hotel, one of the first licensed hotels in Balmain.

John Bell was amongst the more notable boat builders who established themselves in Balmain from the 1830s onwards. After purchase of Brabagan's Lots he proceeded to build a stone wharf and open a shipwright's yard on the site, as well as the residence mentioned above. However, during Bell's ownership the shipyards were not a large operation as he was also running the hotel. (More research would be required to establish the extent of the Bell's boatbuilding activities on the site from 1840 until 1883.)

Fenwick purchased Bell's shipyard in 1883. The property included a wharf, store and the Shipwright's Arms Hotel. Close examination of the store fabric established that it was most likely to have been built between 1875 and 1885 and probably by Fenwick and Co. after they occupied the site.

John Fenwick and his brother Thomas established the firm J Fenwick and Co., a tug boat company, on another site in Balmain, in 1870. The company was to become one of the largest owners of tug boats in Sydney and Newcastle. The company was split several years after foundation, so that John Fenwick concentrated on Sydney whilst Thomas Fenwick handled the coastal river trade from Ballina. Their first tug was the "J and T Fenwick" and registered in January 1871.

The establishment of Fenwick's tug boat company in Balmain is connected with the expansion of privately owned wharfage for foreign trade westwards from Sydney Cove into Walsh Bay and the north-eastern part of Darling Harbour from c. 1870 onwards. Three of the early Fenwick tugs were the Newborough (1888), Loveset (1892) and Hero (1892), built by J. P. Rennoldsons of South Shields, England.

After the death of John Fenwick in 1901 his sons carried on the business. At the time of writing of the 1993 Conservation Plan, it "was the only traditional waterfront industry still in operation in this part of Balmain." At that time the site was owned by Brambles Group who had purchased the site in 1986.

A number of physical changes occurred on the site during the twentieth century. In 1950 the Shipwrights Arms was sold to Miller's brewery by Fenwick's company (who had purchased it as part of their original acquisition in 1883). The boat store was heavily modified in 1963 by the removal of much of its eastern gable, the lowering of its roof and the modification of its setting which included raising ground levels on the southern and western sides. At that time, an administration building was erected on the adjacent site.

In 1993, Brambles submitted a development application for the development of the existing two-storey office building and the erection of eight dwellings. It was the subject of community concern, and was refused by Leichhardt Council on 28 September 1993. Numerous subsequent applications were made by successive owners (Brambles, RoseCorp and Bezzina) and objections lodged by individuals or groups, public meetings held, petitions submitted and Land and Environment Court action taken.

Many residents appeared resigned to accepting the plans of the final developer, Bezzina, when in late 2002 a community group, "Reclaim Bells Foreshore" was formed to attempt to have it acquired as open space for future generations. It was supported by the then-mayor of Leichhardt, Maire Sheehan. A large public meeting in Iloura Reserve on 27 July 2003 boosted the campaign, and on 26 August 2003 Leichhardt Council decided to compulsorily acquire the site.

Following the acquisition, the 1963 administration building was demolished in 2008 to extend the open space of Iloura Reserve and realise part of a plan for a continuous foreshore park. The heritage building underwent a $2 million restoration in 2012.

In 2015, Leichhardt Council passed a development application for an 80-seat restaurant, with a 2.5m hole to be cut in the building's side and a new large concrete balcony built to meet accessibility requirements. This was also met with community opposition, with opponents making their own proposal involving a smaller cafe, gallery and alternative disability access. The redevelopment was reportedly due to be completed in mid-2018. The restaurant has been operating as The Fenwick since 2019.

== Description ==
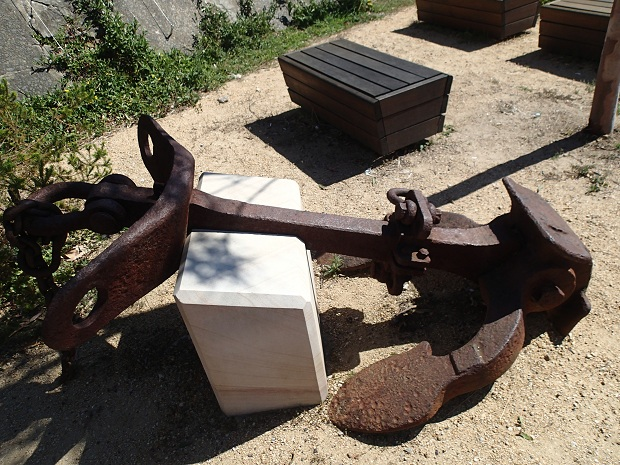
Relic anchor

The J. Fenwick & Co. Boat Store is a rectangular two-storey sandstone building with a shallow pitched gable roof clad in profiled metal sheeting. The building is set against the escarpment of the foreshore with the ground level along the west facade above the window sill height for the first floor. The ground then slopes down along the southern side to a flat waterfront terrace level which fronts the eastern and northern facades of the building. The building therefore presents only two full facades, the east and the north, with only parts of the first floor visible on the south and west sides.

The eastern facade faces the waterfront and contains the finest detailing to the stonework, which is formed of regular coursed sandstone with a rusticated finish. Features include a smoothly finished carved sandstone bracket at either edge of the wall on the upper level towards the parapet and a splayed stone coping which extends along this parapet that is ended by much larger coping elements. The east facade has been altered with a horizontal concrete beam placed as a lintel across the top of the upper door. Above this lintel, the stonework has been clearly reconstructed. Two fluorescent lights extend out from near the top of the wall to the north and south, A slate damp course exists at the base of the facade.

On both levels of the east facade, there are timber framed double goods doors in the centre with a double-hung four pane sash window either side. Both windows on the lower level are protected by galvanised steel sheeting and steel gratings. The central door opening is continuous between the floors and there is a vertically barred ventilation opening across the top of the lower door. A sandstone retaining wall slopes away from the building to the south.

The north facade has dressed and coursed sandstone as lintels, sills and quoins around the window openings and at the building's corners, with roughly squared sandstone rubble infill. All lintels and sills consist of a single large horizontal block of sandstone with smooth margins and a rusticated finish. There are three double-hung sash windows on each level. All windows on the ground floor level have a steel grating on their exterior for protection. A sandstone retaining wall extends out from the building towards the west, and is topped by a steel hand rail.

On the south facade, only the upper level is visible, with the ground sloping up towards the west. The same random coursed, roughly squared sandstone blockwork has been used as for the north facade. Running along the length of the south facade is a timber fascia piece above which sites the galvanised sheet roofing and associated rainwater goods. The roofing butts against the parapet on the east elevation. Just off centre to the west is a smaller version of the timber-framed double goods doors. It has a stone sill and shows evidence of recent work to the mortar in the surrounding blockwork.

The west facade is only visible from roughly halfway up the original window openings around which light wells have been constructed. The facade exhibits the same sandstone blockwork as the north and south walls with similar treatments around the windows. The area under the gabled roof end is covered with vertical galvanised sheeting. Downpipes exist at north ends of the wall.

== Heritage listing ==
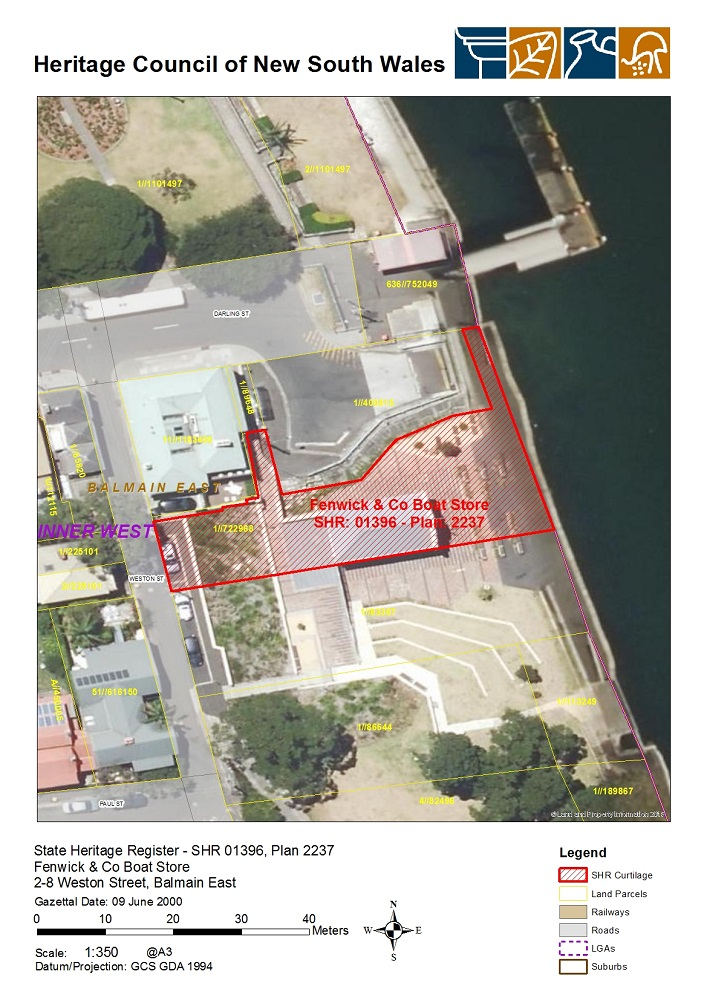
Heritage boundaries

The site of the J. Fenwick & Co. Boat Store is significant because of its continuous association with the growth and development of maritime industries in Balmain, from the earliest days of Balmain's subdivision. This is due to the formation and operation of Bell's Shipyard and the subsequent operations of J. Fenwick & Co.

The site has important links with the development of the port of Sydney because of its association with the use of tug boats as an integral part of shipping operations.

The stone store is a rare surviving built element of Balmain's former links with the maritime service industries of Sydney Harbour, and as such contributes to the cultural significance of the harbour. The stone store physically demonstrates the role of Balmain in the working of Sydney Harbour until recent times (Heritage Office).

The stone store is an early surviving record of maritime industry, not only in Balmain and Sydney, but in New South Wales; and for its long association with the Fenwick Tug Boat Company, which was the earliest and pre-eminent tugboat operator on Sydney Harbour.

Fenwick & Co Boat Store was listed on the New South Wales State Heritage Register on 9 June 2000 having satisfied the following criteria.

The place is important in demonstrating the course, or pattern, of cultural or natural history in New South Wales.

The site has historic significance as a relatively intact unit of early subdivisions in Balmain. It has direct links with John Bell, an important shipwright and personality in the early days of Balmain's settlement. The continued presence of J. Fenwick & Co. Pty Ltd on this site is the only traditional waterfront industry which still operates in this part of Balmain. The site has important associations with the use of tug boats as a crucial part of maritime activity on Sydney Harbour, from their early inception into New South Wales until the present day.

The place is important in demonstrating aesthetic characteristics and/or a high degree of creative or technical achievement in New South Wales.

The J. Fenwick & Co. Boat Store is one of a group of nineteenth century sandstone buildings within the immediate vicinity of the site. These include the former Shipwrights Arms and the Waterman's Cottage at the corner of Darling and Weston Streets. The J. Fenwick & Co. Boat Store demonstrates characteristics found in ancillary waterfront buildings of the nineteenth century.

The place has strong or special association with a particular community or cultural group in New South Wales for social, cultural or spiritual reasons.

The Fenwick & Co. site has social significance as it reflects the growth of Sydney and Balmain from the 1840s. It reflects the development of port facilities within the City of Sydney and the growth of local port infrastructure and support industry at Balmain.
