= Balmain East =

- Suburb
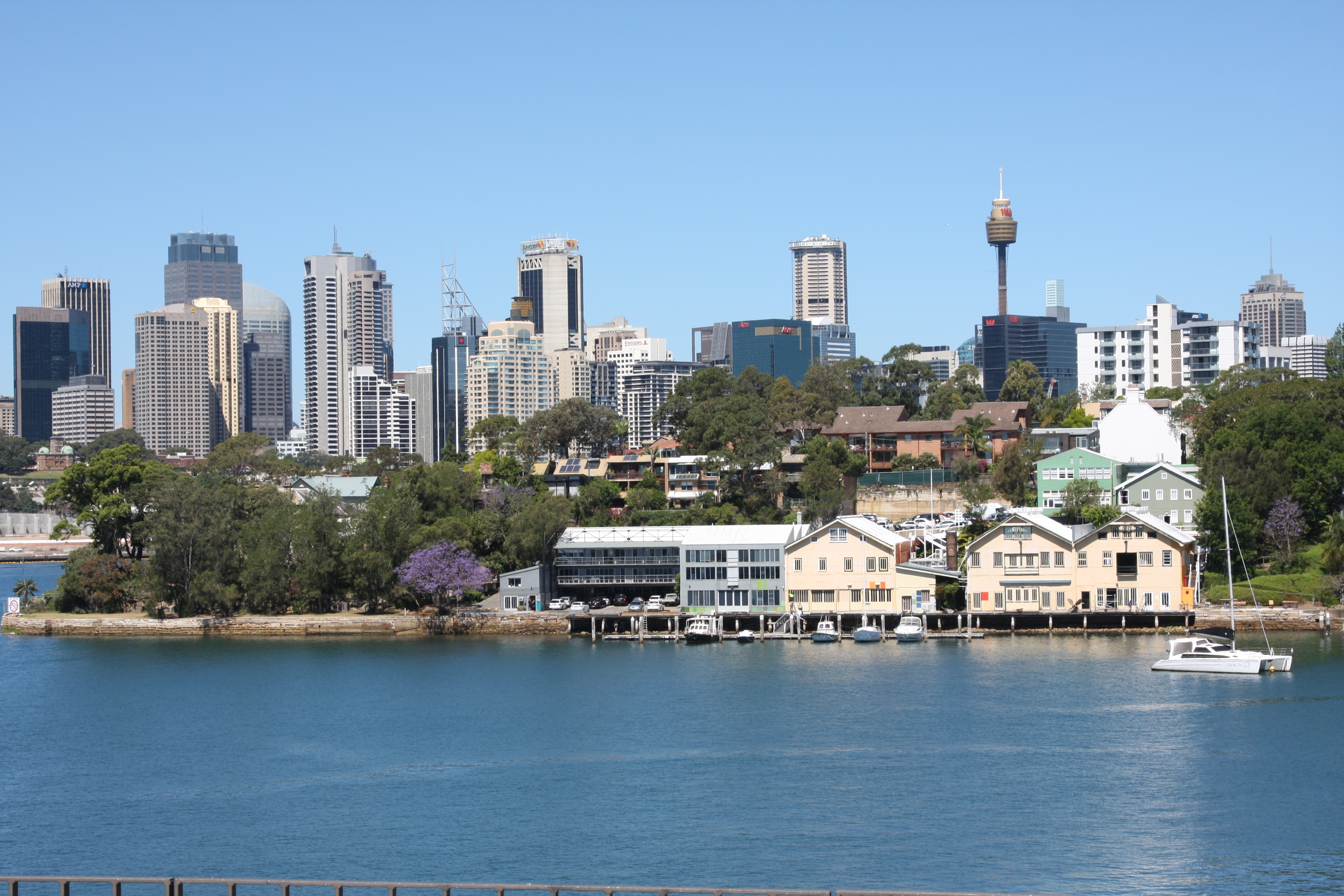
- Simons Point, Balmain East

- Interactive map of Balmain East
- Country: Australia
- State: New South Wales
- City: Sydney
- LGA: Inner West Council
- Location: 5 km (3.1 mi) west of Sydney CBD
- Established: 1995

Government
  - State electorate: Balmain
  - Federal division: Sydney

Area
  - Total: 0.34 km^{2} (0.13 sq mi)
- Elevation: 32 m (105 ft)

Population
  - Total: 1,900 (2021 census)
  - Density: 5,590/km^{2} (14,500/sq mi)
- Postcode: 2041
Suburbs around Balmain East
Birchgrove	Port Jackson
Balmain	Balmain East	Darling Harbour
Balmain

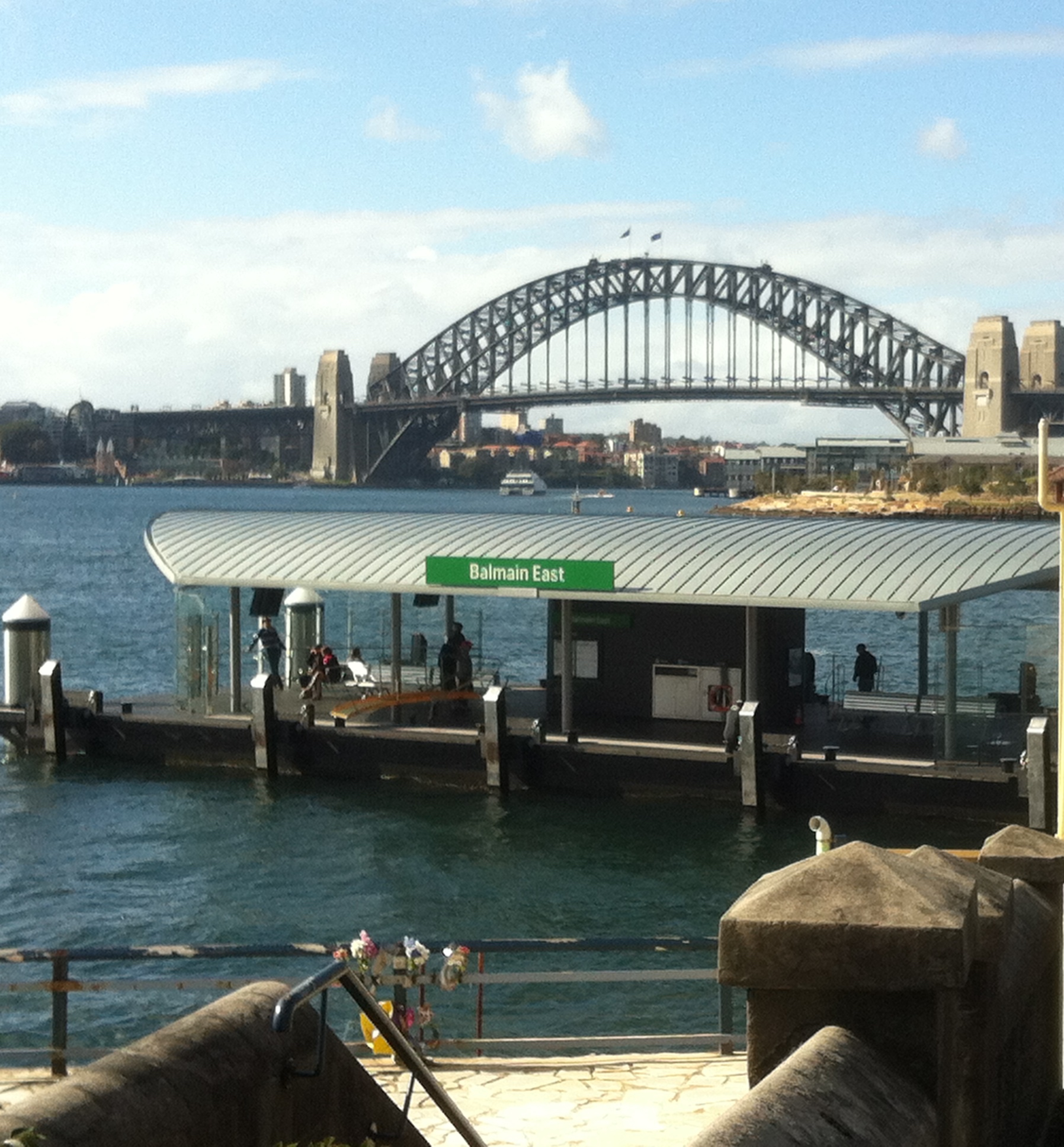
Balmain East Wharf

Balmain East is a suburb in the Inner West of Sydney, in the state of New South Wales, Australia. Balmain East is located three kilometres west of the Sydney central business district, in the local government area of the Inner West Council.

Situated on the eastern end of the Balmain peninsula in Sydney Harbour, Balmain East shares a boundary with the suburb of Balmain to the west. The postcode 2041 covers the suburbs of Balmain, Balmain East and Birchgrove.

== History and culture ==
The area now known as Balmain East was part of a 550-acre (2.2 km^{2}) grant to colonial surgeon Dr. William Balmain (1762–1803) made in 1800 by Governor John Hunter. Balmain was first settled in 1836 and by 1861 had been divided into the well populated eastern areas of Balmain and the sparsely populated western area, extending to the gates of Callan Park.

The small peninsula that jutted out from the main Balmain Peninsula, along which the main artery road Darling Street ran, was known to locals for decades as either "East Balmain" or "The East End" and generally encompassed the area east of Hart St and Balmain Bowling Club. This dividing boundary was originally a natural swamp that was reclaimed early the early 19th century. Whilst the area was almost always referred to as East Balmain by locals, it was still generally regarded as just a name for the eastern peninsula of the suburb, in a similar way in that Birchgrove was the name given to the area of Balmain that encompassed Snails Bay (refer to the history of Birchgrove for more details on its name).

The Balmain markets showcases elements of the suburbs past, with antiques and second hand books, whilst also highlighting the area as a cultural hub in the region. Held weekly on Darling Street, the markets operate between 8:30am and 4pm.

== Heritage listings ==
Balmain East has a number of heritage-listed sites, including:

- 2-8 Weston Street: Fenwick & Co Boat Store
- 10-20 Weston Street: Iloura Reserve

== Transport ==
Balmain East ferry wharf, upgraded in 2015, provides access to the Cross Harbour ferry services, with ferry services to Barangaroo, Circular Quay, and Darling Harbour.

Bus route 442 operated by Transit Systems runs from Balmain East Wharf to Queen Victoria Building, in Sydney's CBD.

== Schools ==
- Nicholson Street Public School

== Demographics ==
According to the 2021 census, there were 1,900 residents in Balmain East. 66.8% of people were born in Australia. The next most common country of birth was England at 8.5%. 84.6% of people only spoke English at home. The most common responses for religious affiliation were No Religion 50.7%, Catholic 21.3% and Anglican 11.0%. Balmain East's population is typically wealthier than the average, with a median weekly household income of $3,020, compared with $1,746 in Australia. The most common types of occupation for employed persons were Professionals (46.0%), Managers (26.6%), and Clerical and Administrative Workers (10.4%). 63.5% of the suburb's occupied private dwellings were family households and 32.8% were lone person households.
