= Harry Howard (landscape architect) =

Pioneer Australian Landscape Architect

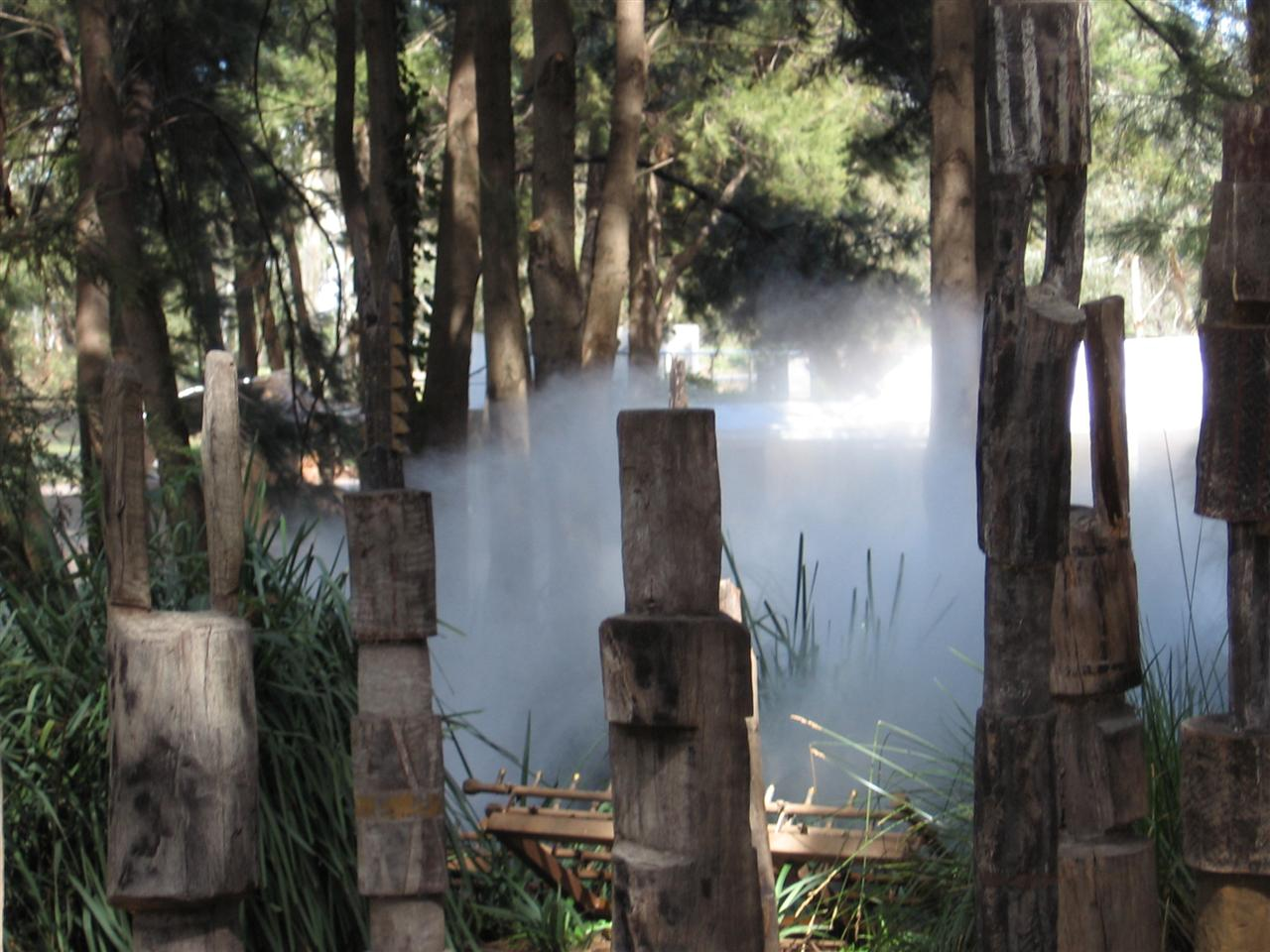
- NGA Sculpture Garden
- Born: 1930
- Died: 2000 (aged 69–70)
- Education: B. Arch 1953, Diploma of Town and Country Planning, 1960 University of Sydney
- Occupations: Architect & Landscape Architect
- Years active: 1953–2000
- Projects: High Court Gardens, NGA Sculpture Garden

Harry Howard (1930–2000) was an Australian landscape architect, and one of the first members of the Australian Institute of Landscape Architects (AILA).

Howard had no formal training in landscape architecture, graduating from the University of Sydney with a degree in architecture. A devotee of the modernist style of architecture, Howard counted Ludwig Mies van der Rohe and Le Corbusier among his influences, and later became friends with Sydney architect of the modernist style, Harry Seidler.
