= Australian Institute of Landscape Architects =

Professional association

The Australian Institute of Landscape Architects (AILA) is the Australian non profit professional institute formed to serve the mutual interests of Australian landscape architects.

== History ==
The AILA was established in 1966 with an interim committee chaired by Richard Clough. The original subscribers were Malcolm Bunzli, Harry Howard, Bruce MacKenzie, Ray Margules, Professor Lindsay Pryor, David Steane, Jean Verschuer, Gavin Walkley and George Williams (Ellis Stones and Alistair Knox were also foundation members). In 1967, the interim committee handed over to an elected Council with Peter Spooner as its first National President. A full list of National Presidents is included on the AILA website.

== Activities ==
The Institute produces a national journal Foreground, which holds regular conferences and an annual AILA State and National Awards. In 2022 the awards showcased landscape design with the emphasis on re-greening and reconciliation.

== Professional recognition ==
The Australian Institute of Landscape Architects (AILA) provides professional registration for landscape architects, in the Australian country. Once registered, AILA landscape architects use the title ‘Registered Landscape Architect’. The AILA’s system of professional recognition is a national system overseen by the AILA National Membership Committee.

Across the eight states and territories within Australia, there is a mix of requirements for landscape architects to be ‘Registered’. Generally there is no clear legislative registration requirement in place. Any regulations or requirements are state based but not national. Some agencies require AILA professional recognition or registration as part of the pre-requisite for contracts. Some contracts and competitions require the AILA recognition or ‘registration’ as the basis of demonstrating a professional status. AILA endorses design competitions that are implemented in accordance with the AILA Competition Policy.

Registered and non AILA registered landscape Architects practise in the disciplines of landscape design and construct, landscape planning, landscape management, urban design, and those landscape architects employed as academics within universities.

Professional recognition includes a commitment to continue professional development. AILA Registered Landscape Architects are required to report annually on their Continuing Professional Development.

== Accreditation ==
The AILA accredits landscape architecture programs at Australian universities:

- Deakin University
- Queensland University of Technology (QUT)
- Royal Melbourne Institute of Technology (RMIT)
- University of Adelaide
- University of Canberra
- University of New South Wales (UNSW)
- University of Melbourne
- University of Technology, Sydney (UTS)
- University of Western Australia (UWA)

The AILA is a member association of the International Federation of Landscape Architects (IFLA).

== See also ==
- Society of Australian Golf Course Architects
- Landscape design
- Landscape architecture
- New Zealand Institute of Landscape Architects
