= Gordon Ford =

Australian landscape designer

- Born: 1918
- Died: 1999 (aged 81)
- Occupation: Architect
- Spouse: Gwen

Gordon Ford (1918–1999) was an Australian landscape designer who created rugged gardens which were noted to be of a distinctly Australian style.

After returning from service in New Guinea in WWII, he settled near Montsalvat, where he dug out a site and built a house made out of mud bricks from the clay.

Ford worked closely with British architect Alistair Knox. He trained as a landscape gardener with Ellis Stones.

In the last years of his life he trained landscape designer Sam Cox.

== Books ==
- Gordon Ford: The Natural Australian Garden, Gordon & Gwen Ford (Bloomings Books)
- Australian Garden Design, Ellis Stones (Macmillan)
- Capability Brown, Dorothy Shroud (Faber)
