= Montsalvat =

Artists' colony in Melbourne, Australia

Coordinates: 37.7280°S 145.1521°E

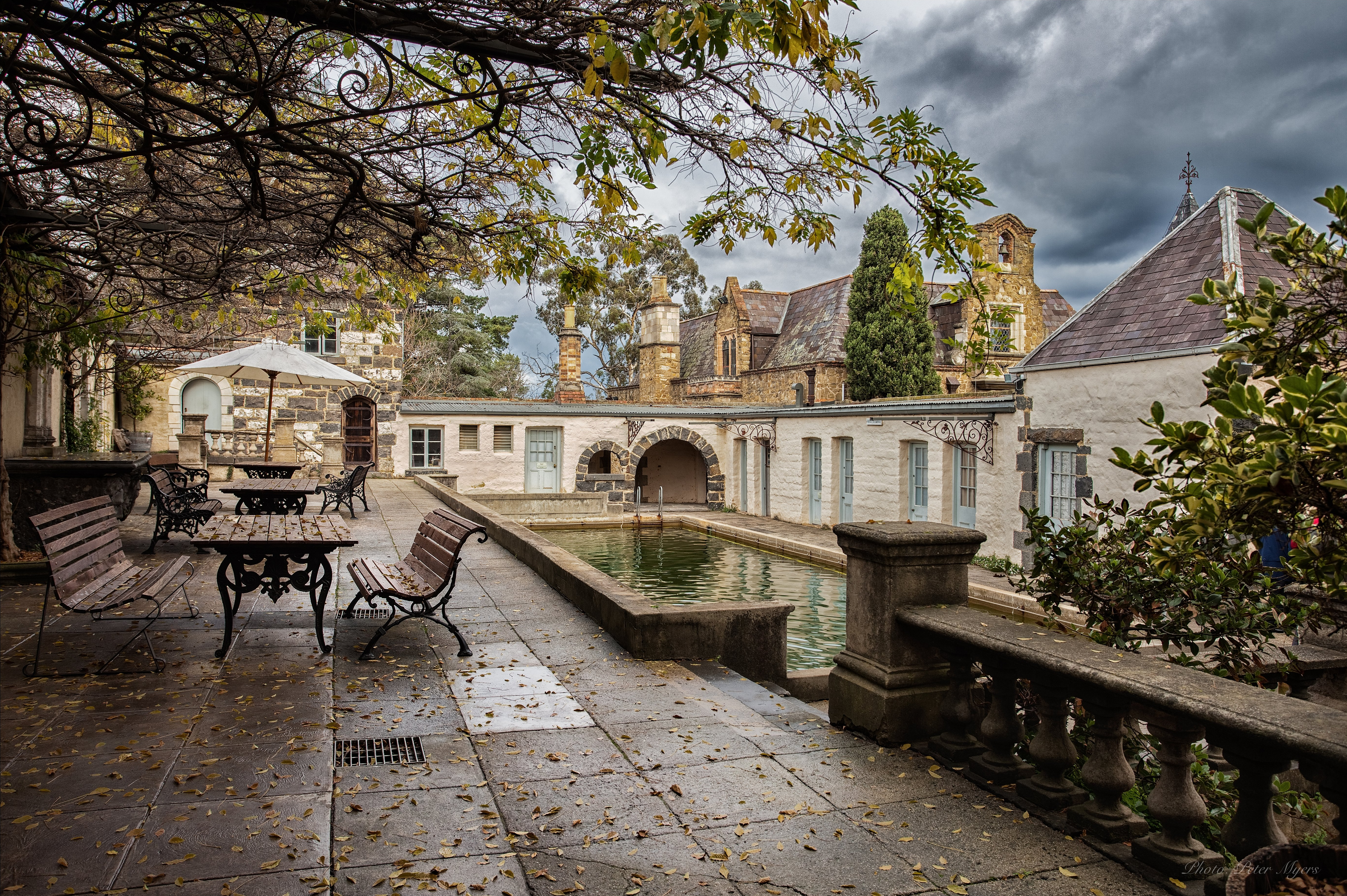
Montsalvat's "Meeting Pool" area

Montsalvat is an artists' community in Eltham, a suburb of Melbourne, Victoria, Australia. Established by Justus Jorgensen in 1934, the colony is set among gardens on five hectares (12 acres) of land, and is home to dozens of buildings, including houses, halls, studios, galleries and stables.

All of Montsalvat's buildings were designed and built by residents using materials from a variety of sources, including Victorian era buildings then being demolished in the city centre. The grounds and buildings are currently used for exhibitions, performances, conferences, seminars, weddings and receptions; however, artists working in a variety of media continue to reside in Montsalvat. Several classes on various disciplines of art are offered year round by the resident artists.

Today Montsalvat is a popular tourist attraction and the entire complex is listed on the Victorian Heritage Register.

== Etymology ==
The name Montsalvat features in both German and English mythology. In the opera Parsifal by German composer Richard Wagner, Montsalvat is the castle, built by Titurel, where the Holy Grail is protected; and in Act III of his namesake opera, Lohengrin sings of it as home. In the English legend of "King Arthur and the Knights of the Round Table", Montsalvat is mentioned as the home of the Holy Grail. Though established only in 1934, Montsalvat has created its own myths and legends. Montsalvat means "Saved Mount" in Catalan.

== History ==
=== Background ===
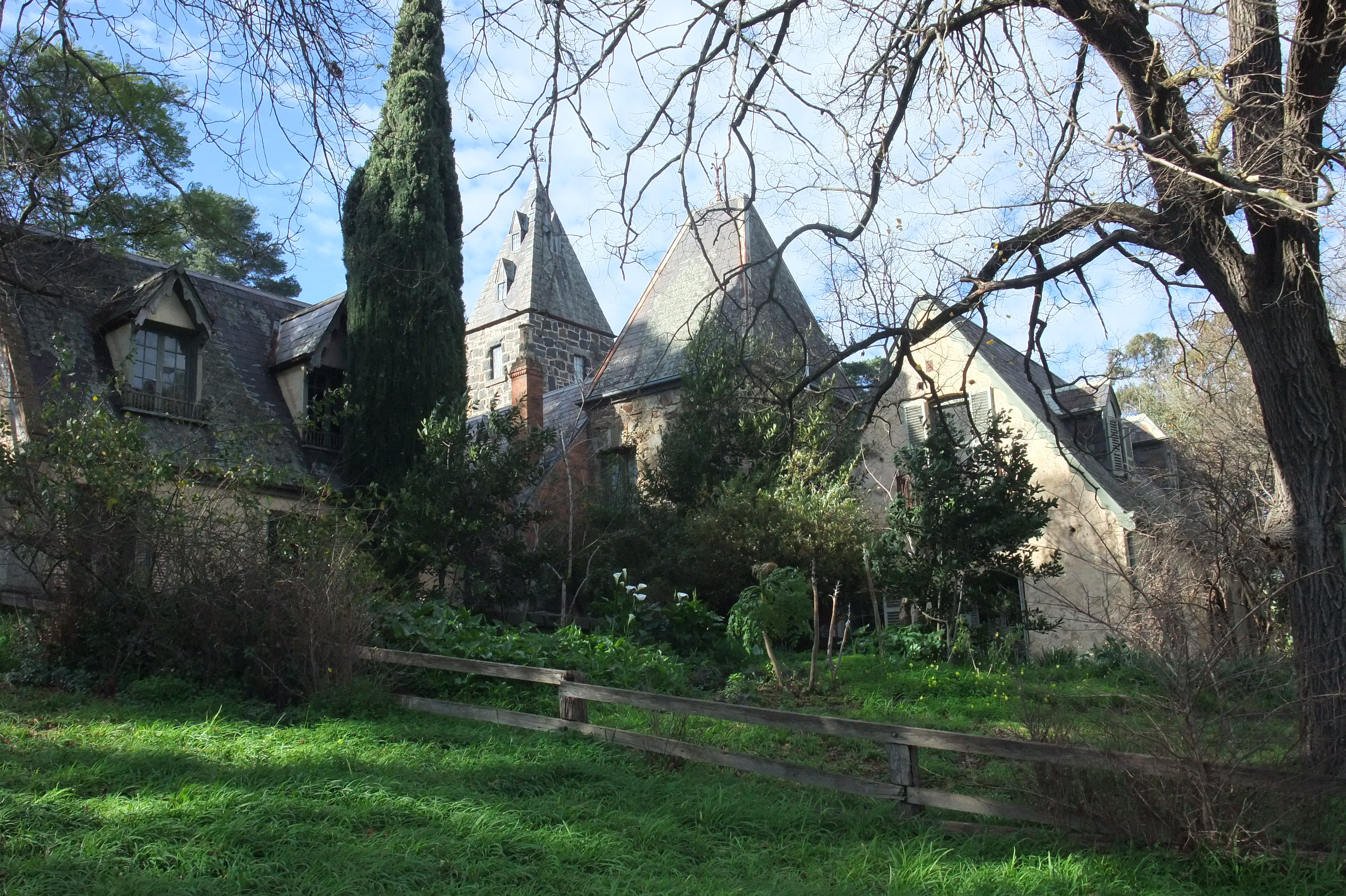
Buildings around Montsalvat

Montsalvat is the creation of Justus Jorgensen and the work of many hands. Born in 1894, Jorgensen trained as an architect with a Melbourne firm of architects, Schreiber & Co. Later, he turned his talents to painting, enrolling at the National Gallery School of Art in Melbourne, whose principal was a leading member of the Heidelberg School of Artists, Frederick McCubbin. In 1917, after hearing a lecture by the artist Max Meldrum, Jorgensen decided to join the Meldrum Studio and adopt his tonalist technique.

In 1924 Jorgensen married a medical student from Brisbane, Lillian Smith. In the same year the couple travelled to Europe with a group of artist friends including John and Polly Farmer, Colin Colahan and Archie Colquhoun. The group painted at various places on their way across Italy, Spain, France and England. In their travels they visited many of the great European galleries to study the old and modern masters of European painting. Meldrum joined the group while they were painting in Cassis, a small French village near the Mediterranean coast. Later, some of them moved to Paris where Jorgensen established himself in a studio at 147 Rue Broca in the 13th Arrondissement.

He returned to Australia in 1929. During this period, Jorgensen enjoyed considerable success both in Paris and London, with exhibitions at several major galleries including being hung at the prestigious Royal Academy Summer Exhibition in both 1926 and 1927, a rare honor for an Australian. The influences of this period in Europe are apparent both in his painting and in the architecture of Montsalvat. Jorgensen bought a home and studio in the Melbourne bayside suburb of Brighton and later leased an old warehouse in Queen Street, Melbourne as his city studio where he could work and teach.

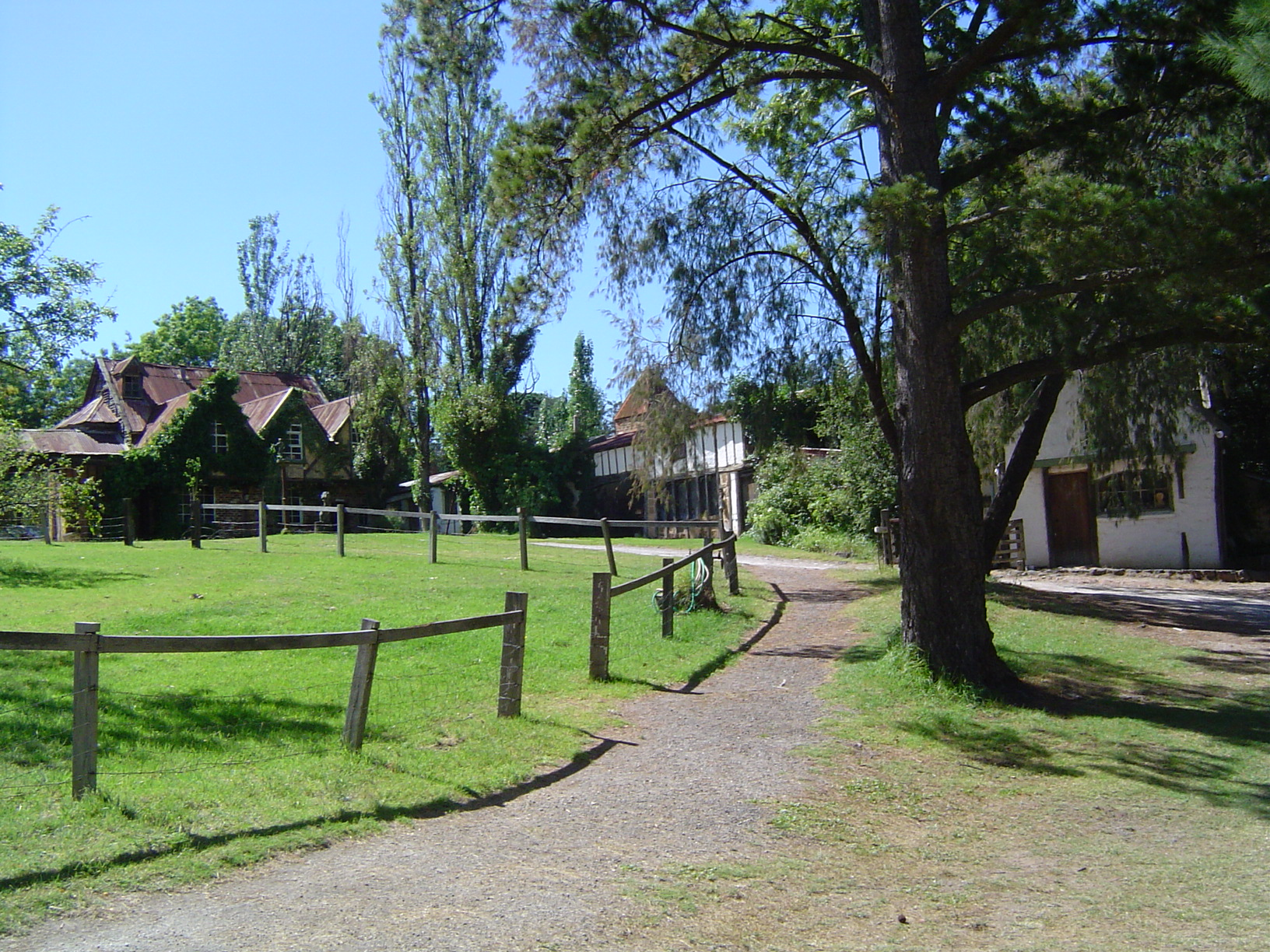
Artist houses

In 1956 the studio had to be vacated when the building was demolished to make way for the Royal Automobile Club of Victoria (RACV). The Queen Street classes had attracted many students and the studio had become an important hub of intellectual and bohemian life in conservative Melbourne. Jorgensen had continued to accept architectural work and in 1934 while working on the design and construction of a studio in Eltham for the painter and cartoonist Percy Leason, he decided that it was here he wanted to live, and so the Montsalvat dream began. Jorgensen invited his students and friends to join him in Eltham where he harnessed their collective enthusiasm in the building of Montsalvat.

Among those early students and friends were author and critic Mervyn Skipper, his wife Lena and their three children (Helen, Sonia, and Matcham), Arthur Munday, George Charlmers, Lesley Sinclair, Sue Vanderkelen, Ian Robertson, Helen Lempriere, John Smith, John Busst and Myra Skipper. Percy Leason and his family lived next door and then there were the many friends who came to join in the work and the camaraderie of the camp. Two notable Australian artists said to be associated with Montsalvat were Leonard French and Albert Tucker.

=== Early Montsalvat ===
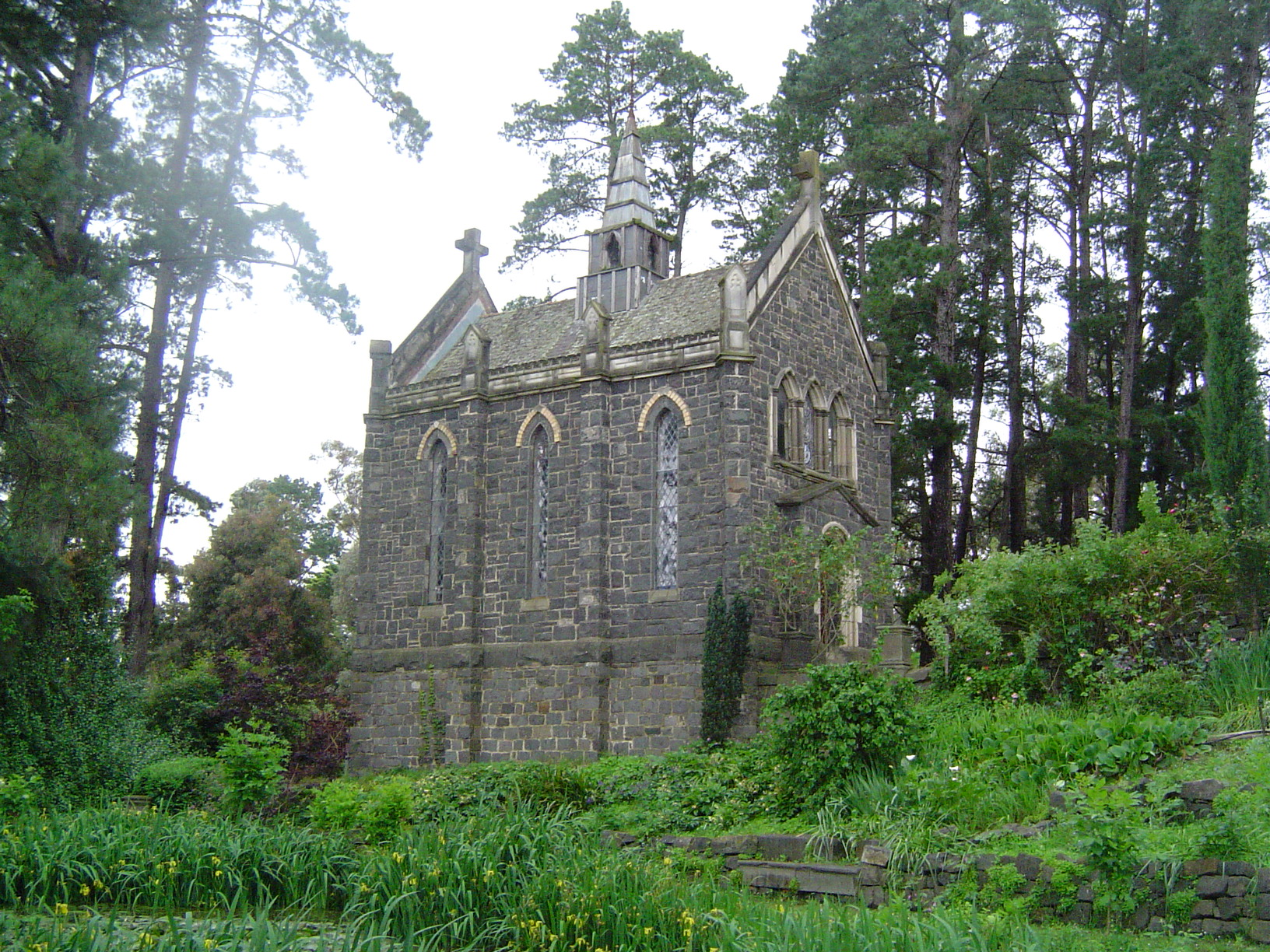
The Chapel

The Eltham district had been settled since the 1850s; some of these early pioneers had used mud bricks to build their farmhouses, but the method had long been abandoned. Jorgensen saw value in the building technique. The local soils appeared suitable for both adobe (mudbrick) and pisé de terre (rammed earth) and it was cheap, so he set his students to work. He dispatched Arthur Munday, to the State Library in Melbourne to research the technique. There was little written material available, as the methods has been handed down from father to son. Arthur finally found in the writings of the ancient Roman historian Pliny some of the information they were looking for.

Slate for the roofs came from a friend's recently demolished house, discarded fire bricks, tiles and other material came from other sites. The recently demolished Bijou Theatre (in Bourke Street) proved a rich resource which provided the beautiful cast iron circular staircase, architrave mouldings and some of the doors and windows. Helen Lempriere's family donated materials and money to build the ornamental pond. The many doors that open onto the pond area are from the cubicles that were the students' bedrooms, which have now been combined into one long studio. (The original inhabitants' initials can be seen on the front doorstep of each room). The small bluestone tower, limestone studio and Long Gallery were added later to form the closed courtyard.

=== The Great Hall ===
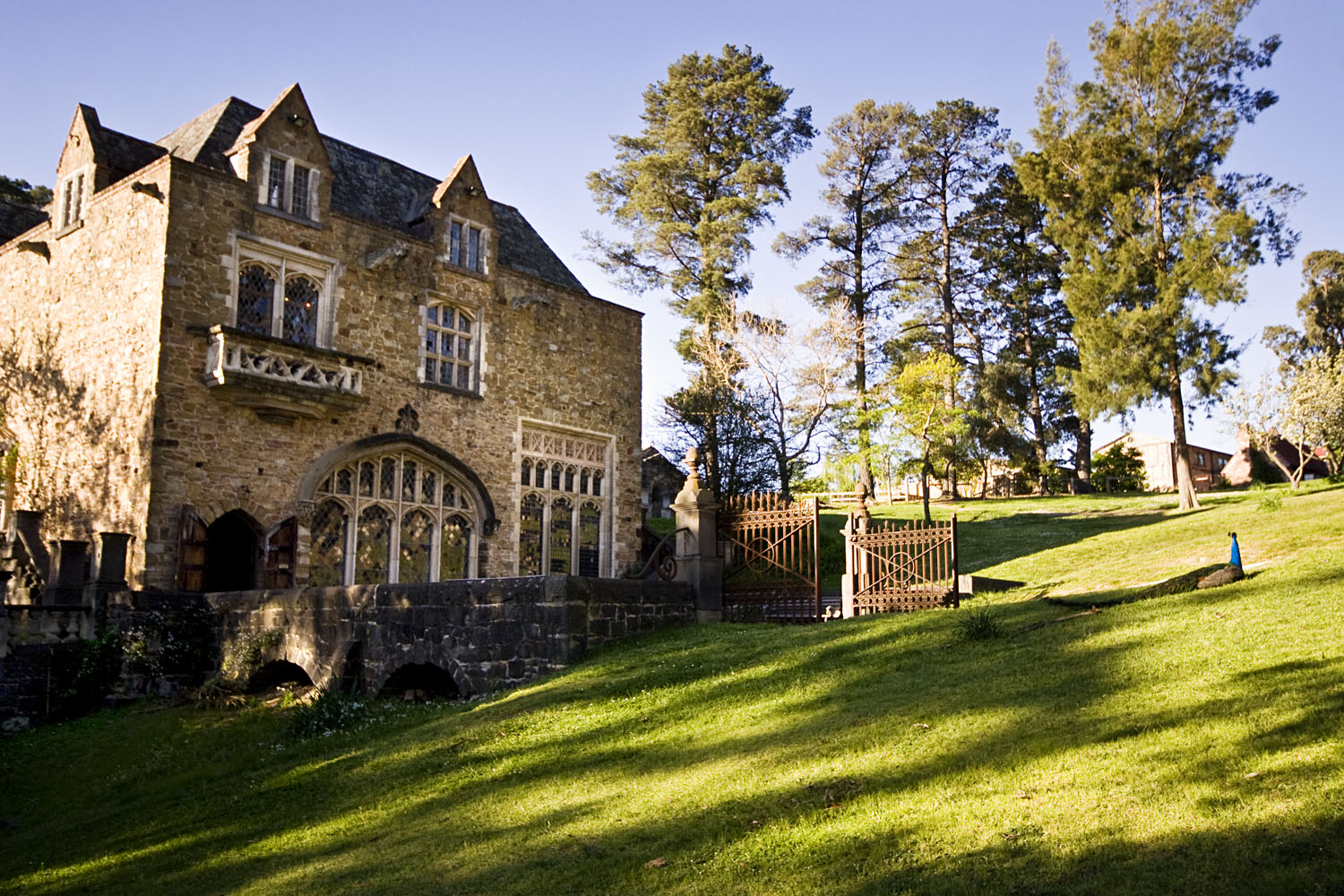
The Great Hall

Work on the Great Hall began in 1938 with a local tradesman Len Jarrold as the leading hand. Jorgensen had originally designed a modest structure of mud brick, however during the excavation a reef of mudstone was uncovered. The unique ochre tones of the stone inspired Jorgensen to re-design and the resulting larger structure was the Great Hall. He was fortunate in that Whelan the Wreckers were demolishing the charming Royal Insurance Building which stood at 414, Collins Street, Melbourne, which contained the limestone windows and the stone balconies carved in the Gothic manner, that now adorn the Great Hall and give it its unique character. Students carved other windows and the gargoyles, which incorporated the traditional grotesque faces as seen in medieval architecture.

Extra stone for the walls came from a nearby quarry and the bluestone, granite and limestone from demolition sites across Melbourne. Some of the flagstones and roofing slates had originally been shipped from Ireland and Wales as ballast aboard the sailing ships that serviced Australia in the 19th century.

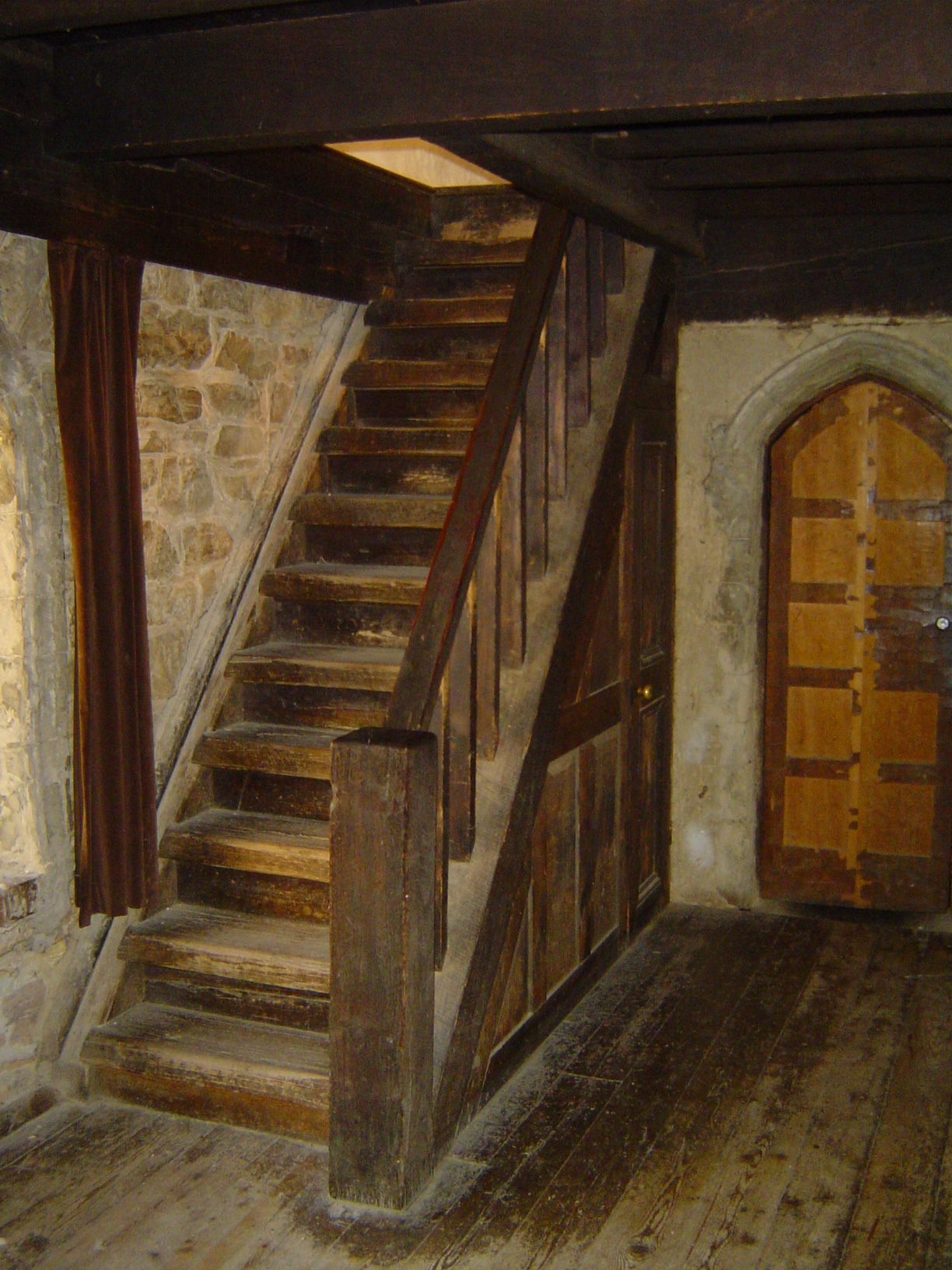
Wooden staircase in the Great Hall.

Work on the Great Hall was interrupted by the outbreak of World War II. Some of the students enlisted in the armed forces while others assisted on the home front. Montsalvat was turned into a farm and market garden. Jorgensen and his now smaller 'team' turned their creative abilities to these new projects, building the barns and sheds. Materials were scarce, but they managed to scrounge odd bits and pieces – from discarded broken bricks and rusty galvanized iron to timber poles cut from the bush. Additional to the market garden was the dairy and poultry farm with the produce being sold through the local markets.

The Department of the Army took an interest and allowed a skilled joiner and cabinetmaker, Phil Taffe to help with the project. Phil, although almost blind, worked on the new buildings and helped make some of the refectory tables, stools, carved chairs and other furniture that can be seen in the Great Hall today.

After the war, work on the Great Hall and other buildings resumed. The slate floor in the hall and the wooden floors above were finally put in place. Students were given the task of carving the corbels and other embellishments around the windows and doors as part of their training. Some of the stonework came from Wilson Hall at the University of Melbourne, which had been badly damaged by fire in 1952. Local tradesmen joined the team, as did some new students and aspiring artists fresh back from the horrors of the war, like Clifton Pugh, Gordon Ford and Joe Hannan and tradesmen Horry Judd, Bill Floyd, Wallt Stephens, Ken Howard, plus several refugees from Europe and Asia.

== Montsalvat Jazz Festival ==
Montsalvat had previously hosted jazz festivals in 1976 and 1977 as part of the Eltham Festival, but it wasn't until the late 1980s that this became permanent.

The Montsalvat Jazz Festival, sometimes called the Montsalvat International Jazz Festival, ran from 1988-1996 and was founded by Sigmund Jorgensen, son of Montsalvat’s founder Justus Jorgensen.

The festival was held in January each year at Montsalvat until 1996 when it relocated to within Melbourne's CBD, using venues such as the Forum Theatre. Festival artistic directors included Allan Leake (1988-93), Bob Sedergreen (1994-5), Ted Vining (1996).

At the end of 1996, the Montsalvat Jazz Festival was announced as no longer running. Instead, it would be replaced with a new festival called Marvellous Melbourne Jazz Festival in January 1997 run by former co-organiser of the Montsalvat Jazz Festival Mal Harrop. After one year, the Marvellous Melbourne Jazz Festival was renamed as The Melbourne International Jazz Festival.

== Recent history and today ==
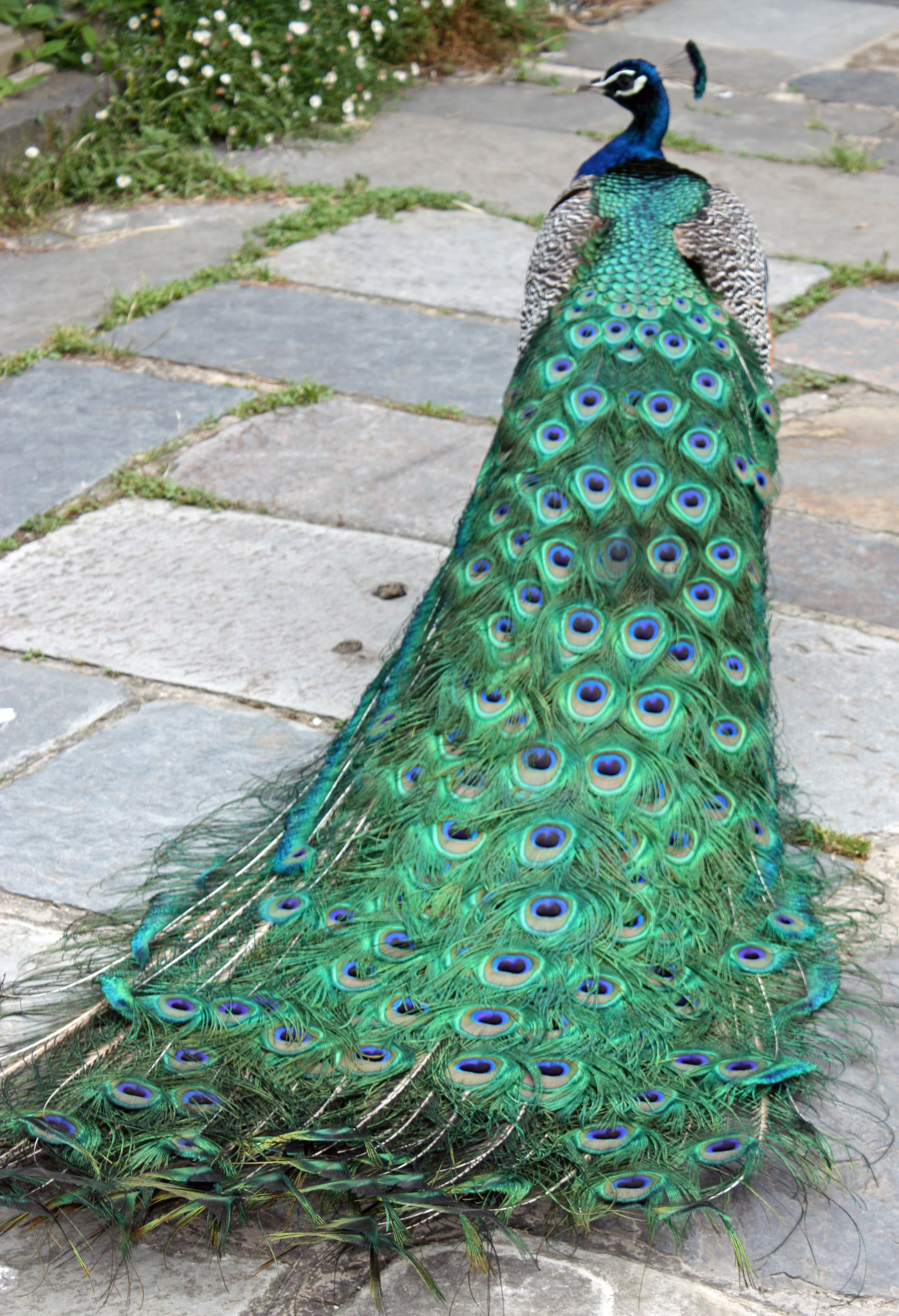
Montsalvat is known for its resident animals, including peacocks.

In 1975, Montsalvat became a Charitable Trust with Jorgensen's youngest son Sigmund as the chairman of the Trust and its administrator. In 1989 the work at Montsalvat was recognised by the Victorian Government when the property was placed on Heritage Victoria's Register, soon followed by a classification by the National Trust of Victoria. In October 1998 the Australian Heritage Commission included Montsalvat on the Australian Register of National Estate. (No. 100160) The Shire of Nillumbik council has also listed the property as a Heritage Place.

In 1996 the red brick barn/workshop/studio towards the entrance was subjected to arson and burnt down. It was subsequently rebuilt and now forms the main entrance and exhibition space known as the Barn Gallery. This is now where the majority of exhibitions and performances are held today.

In 2006, an unpaid tax debt forced the current administration to sell land in nearby Christmas Hills after a bitter fight with a Victorian State Government appointed administrator.

Montsalvat today is a place where emerging and established artists can present and perform their work. Its visual features are enjoyed by tourists from around the world, and it can be found listed in many major Melbourne tourist guides. Public events (including exhibitions and performances), Film and Photography, Celebrations and Gatherings of many types are held on the property and amongst its buildings frequently. The Great Hall, Long Gallery, Barn Gallery and Chapel are used for private functions including weddings and receptions. Some Melbourne funeral directors use Montsalvat as a funeral venue. Montsalvat houses facilities for commercial gatherings such as seminars and conferences. Its spaces can accommodate up to 200 people, while formal meals can be provided for up to 120 guests.

== Cultural depictions ==
With the introduction of television, the European and medieval buildings quickly became a popular location for locally-filmed commercials. Crawford Productions utilized it a number of times, including for its late 1960s spy series Hunter. It has been one of the filming locations for two vampire films, Thirst in 1979, and Queen of the Damned (2002).

It was used for the opening scenes of John D. Lamond's Ozploitation film, Felicity (1979).

Montsalvat was used as an abandoned monastery in episode 4 of Neighbours in 1985. In episode 5600 of Neighbours in 2008, it doubled as Portugal.

It was used as a filming location for Skithouse.

It was used for an episode of Miss Fisher's Murder Mysteries in 2013. The episode was titled "Murder under the Mistletoe" and was broadcast on ABC1 on 22 December 2013.

It was used for the wedding scene in Season 6 of the Australian drama Offspring in 2016.

Scenes for Judy and Punch (2019) set in 17th century Britain were filmed here.

The finale of The Bachelor Australia in 2023 was filmed at Montsalvat.

== See also ==
- Australian art
- Box Hill artists' camp
- Heide Museum of Modern Art
- Heidelberg School
- Architecture of Melbourne
