= Ringwood Library =

- Interactive map of the Ringwood Library area

General information
- Architectural style: Postmodern
- Location: 4 Melbourne Street, Ringwood, Ringwood, Australia
- Coordinates: 37°48′51″S 145°13′42″E
- Completed: 1995
- Closed: 2013
- Demolished: 2013

Design and construction
- Architects: Edmond & Corrigan Pty Ltd

The Ringwood Library: Edmond and Corrigan was situated in the Eastern suburbs of Melbourne, Victoria, within the Ringwood Plaza complex, completed in 1995. The building stood alone as an icon in the area of Ringwood and set itself apart from the surrounding plaza and is noticeably differentiates from Eastland shopping centre, which sits to the north of the site.

== Description ==
The Ringwood Public Library was located in Melbourne's east in Ringwood, Victoria. In the 1950s, the town developed into a suburb and is flanked by the Maroondah Highway and the railway line, allowing easy access to Melbourne. With a large proportion of single parent families, the town embodies the changes in Australian society that took place in the latter half of the 20th century.

Part of the funds used to build Ringwood Library were contributed by an enterprising local council, who also developed a nearby shopping mall. The library was highly accessible as it was situated near the centre of transport-related facilities and services, including public transport and car parks. The library was designed differently from its retail neighbours in order for it to serve as a local landmark.

On approach the entrance of the library created a sense of elevation from ground level which is created from the full height space. The coloured glass window, sage green and grey corrugated steel roof were also a focal point of the facade when observing from the entrance. A sheltered walkway connected the main shopping mall and the library. The utilization of colour and varying roof shapes shown in the interior, were specifically chosen by the architects Edmond and Corrigan, with the sole purpose of producing a suburban landmark that is easily distinguishable from the surrounding town.

On the other hand, the interior planning is simplified, with an open plan interior. This space included an entrance lobby that rose into double height space. The location of the collections and other facilities were clearly stated on oversized signposts, which could be seen from every location within the library and acts as Post-Modern play on the ordinary. The Shelves containing printed and electronic collections fanned out from the information desk and were arranged in Dewey decimal system. Access to chairs and desks from the shelves was within the same vicinity. The shelves were also arranged in a manner that provided spatial division between different areas, such as children's material, large print and computing facilities. The Planning of the library is to provide ease for the user and the architectural design which is external expresses itself internally also.

The planning of internal space was divided into spaces such as, the family history section is the only public room isolated from the main collection as it stores priceless archives. The staff work areas, were situated in offices which surround the building, mainly those near the loading bay, where provision is made for storage and distribution. There was also a rest room with kitchen equipment. The location of the staff work areas was strategically chosen to assist with the surveillance of deliveries and does not compete with the public aspects of the library.

The coloured glass curtain of the main window served to shield from the intense Australian sun. The other windows were low level, with large overhangs for solar protection. Towards the side of the library, there was a small garden, which also provided more shade, and views. There was only one small, clerestory window which enabled direct access to sunlight. This window was carefully controlled in order to create a cool, glare-free working environment. The library collections and facilities were all located in a single area, which was easily visible to staff. Their arrangement allowed study and browsing to occur with ease and interaction. However, the height of the ceiling and the large signpost, both of which are super-human scale. This could be an analogy of the purpose of the building, which is to store and disseminate knowledge via reading whilst also elevating the level of understanding of the world as a whole.

== Postmodern design approach ==
The Ringwood library used strong methodologies of postmodern architecture and contained many similarities of other work by Edmond and Corrigan such as RMIT building 8, Athan House and The VCA Theatre building.

The building used colour in a postmodern fashion and the use of different elements like the vaulted roof and polychromatic feature glazing." The colours used in this polychromatic fashion were also continued on through to the external tiling which was broken up by silver in appearance futuristic looking sliding door.

== Closure and demolition of the library ==
Edmond and Corrigan's Ringwood Library was demolished in 2013 to make way for the Eastland stage 5 expansion and a new library, Realm, constructed as part of the development.

== Photographs ==
Interior photograph of Ringwood library's form.

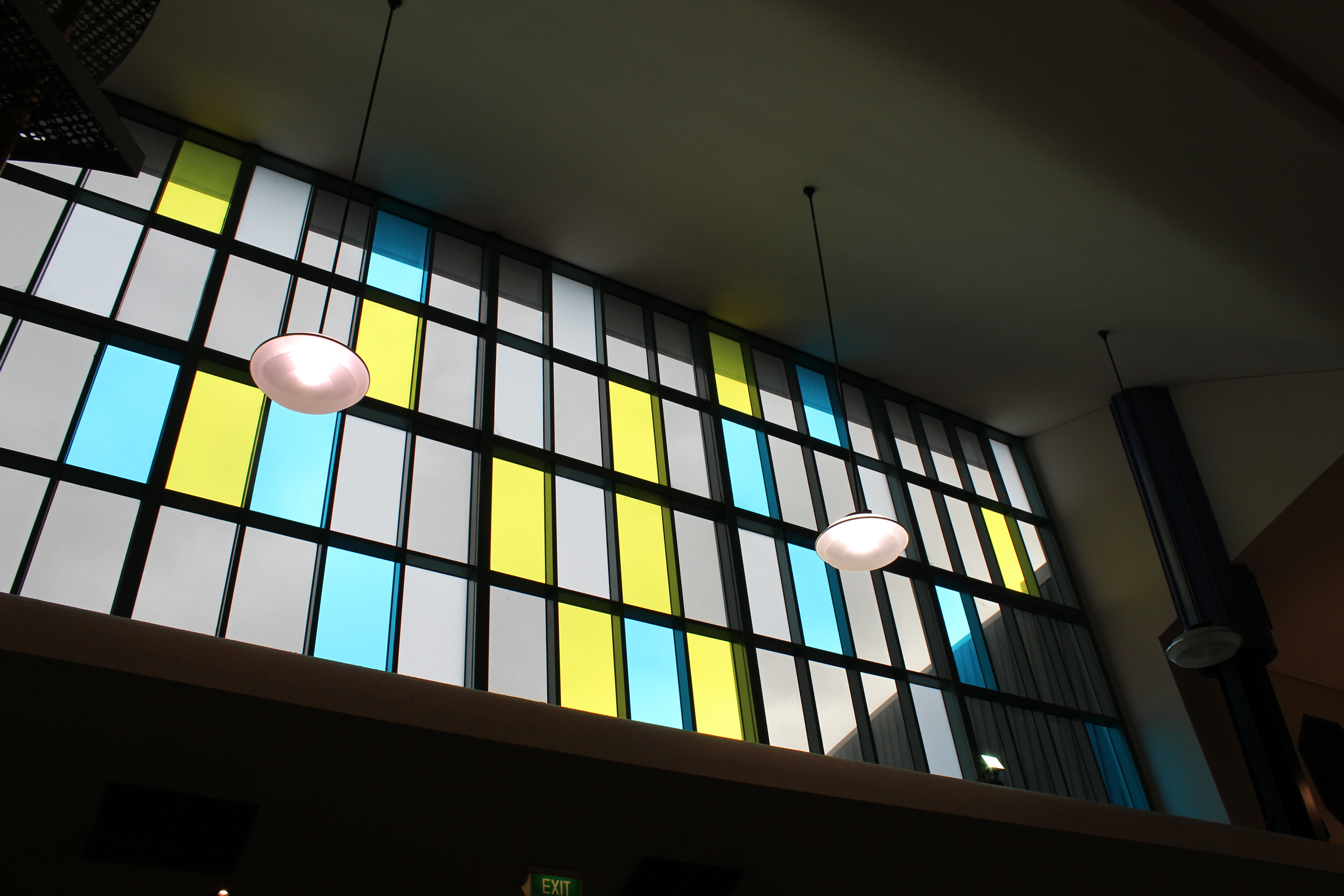
Interior photograph of polychromatic windows.

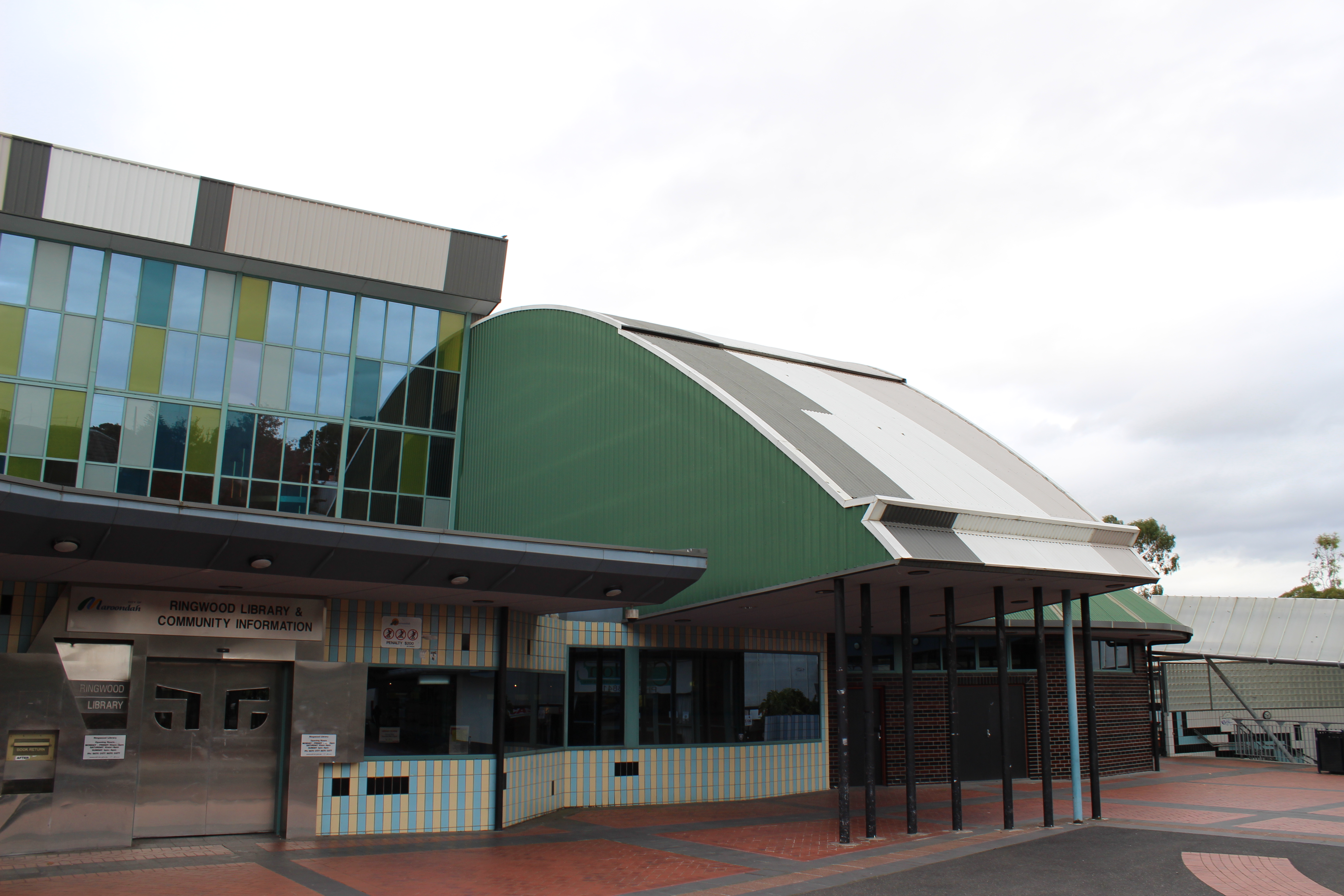
Exterior photograph of polychromatic windows.

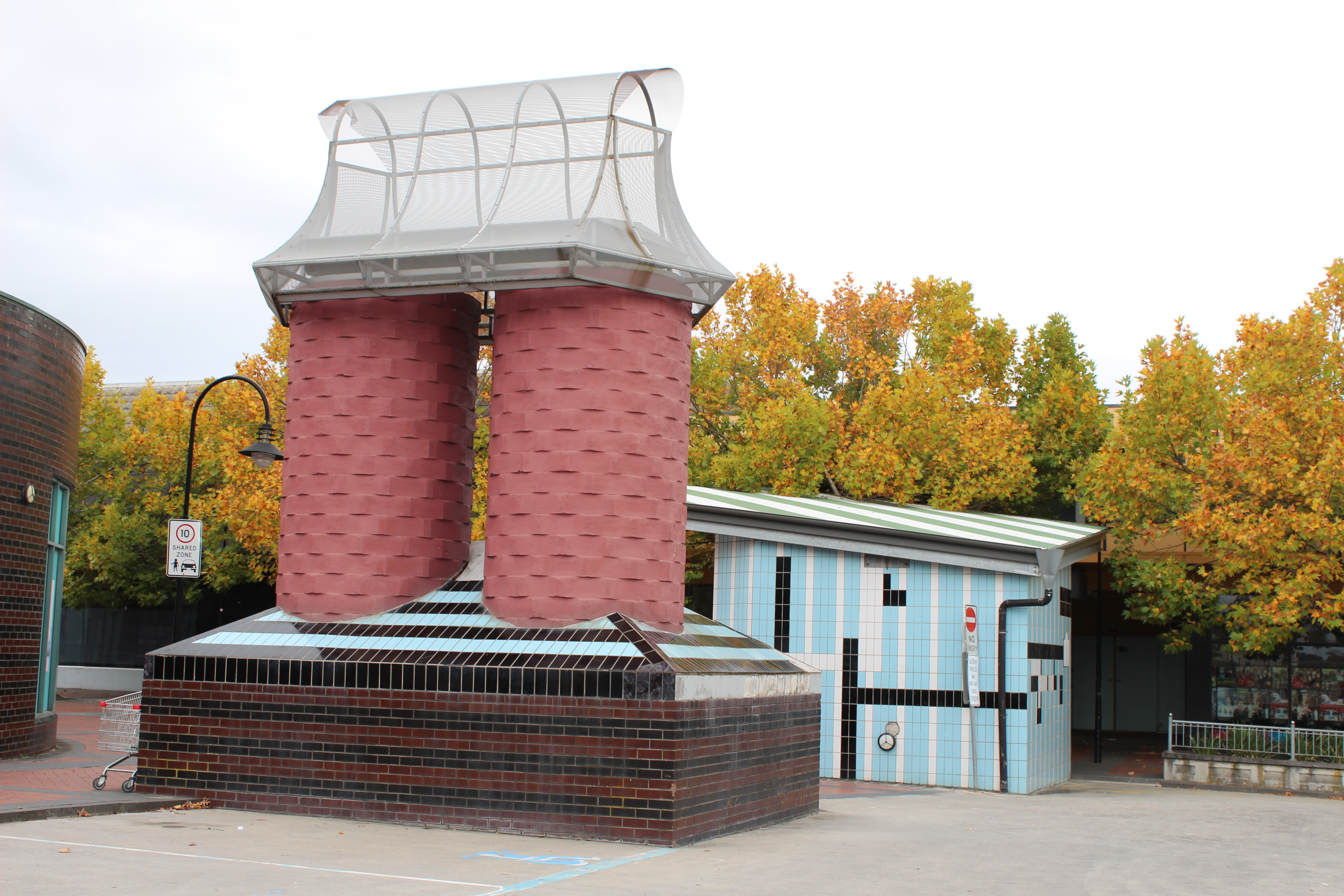
The exhaust system near the Ringwood library used as ornament.

== Awards ==
- RAIA (Vic Chapter) Award for Urban Design, 1995
- RAIA (Vic Chapter) Award of Merit, New Institutional Public buildings, 1995

== See also ==
- Peter Corrigan
