= Chapel of St Joseph =

Anglican church in Melbourne, Victoria, Australia

Chapel of St Joseph (former)
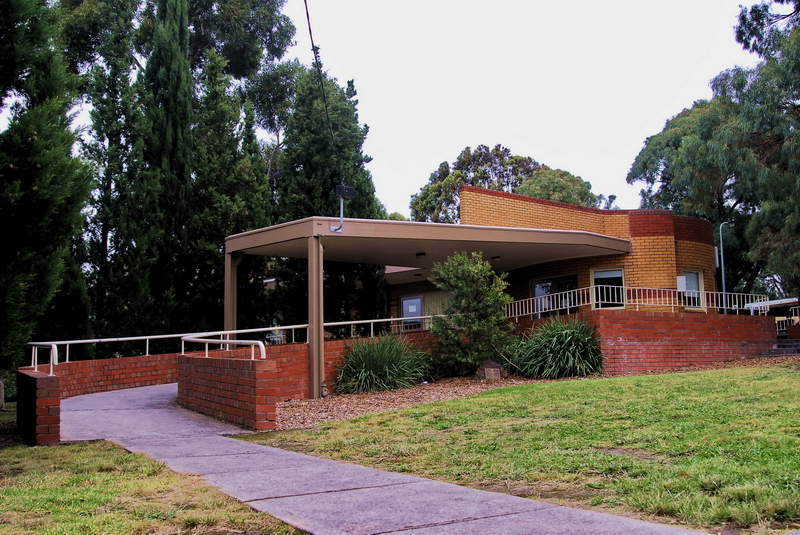
- The former chapel in 2011

- Location of the church in Greater Metropolitan Melbourne
- Chapel of St Joseph (former)
- 37°48′28″S 145°06′44″E
- Location: 27-29 Strabane Ave, Mont Albert North, Melbourne, Victoria
- Country: Australia
- Denomination: Roman Catholicism (former)

History
- Status: Closed (c. 1991); Repurposed for community use
- Founder: Father Michael Burke
- Dedication: Saint Joseph

Architecture
- Functional status: Chapel (1978–c. 1991)
- Architects: Maggie Edmond; Peter Corrigan
- Architectural type: Church
- Style: Post-modernism
- Years built: 1976–1978
- Completed: 1978
- Closed: c. 1991

Specifications
- Materials: Cream and red brick; steel

Victorian Heritage Register
- Official name: Former Chapel of St Joseph
- Type: Registered place
- Criteria: D, H
- Designated: 11 February 2016
- Reference no.: H2351
- Heritage overlay no.: HO263
- Category: Religion
- Building details

General information
- Owner: City of Whitehorse (since 1991)

Design and construction
- Awards: RAIA (Vic): New Buildings, 1983; Enduring Architecture, 2003

The Chapel of St Joseph is a former Roman Catholic chapel, located in Mont Albert North, an eastern suburb of Melbourne, Victoria, Australia. No longer in use for worship and acquired by the City of Whitehorse, the building is now known as the Strabane Chapel Hall and was repurposed for community use, including by the University of the Third Age.

Located on the traditional lands of the Wurundjeri, the former chapel was added to the Victorian Heritage Register on 11 February 2016 in recognition of its architectural and social significance. The Victorian branch of the National Trust also added the building to a non-statutory historic list on 2 February 2004.

== Architectural context ==
The Chapel of St Joseph was commissioned by Father Michael Burke, priest of the Holy Redeemer Parish in Surrey Hills in 1976, to provide the local community with a space for both worship and community use. Fr Burke was impressed with the Church of the Resurrection, Keysborough, completed in 1976 to designs by Edmond and Corrigan.

The chapel in Mont Albert North was designed in the Post-modernist style in response to the Roman Catholic Church's post-Vatican II reforms. The light-filled space reflect its multi-use purpose as both a place of worship and community activity, including for the occupants of an adjoining aged care facility.

In the late 1970s there was a shift in commonly held aesthetic ideals that influenced Melbourne architecture revealed in houses and small-scale institutional buildings. This suburban nature including the adoption of banal, everyday elements and materials in the design and function, set these buildings apart from similarly-aged work. This chapel and the Keysborough church were described as being the most confronting works of the late 1970s, and signify the influence of Maggie Edmond and Peter Corrigan, and their practice, on Australian architecture. The building won several architectural awards.

== Description ==
The single-storey cream and red brick chapel comprises a nave, lobby, ancillary spaces, front patio and long curved ramp and access verandah along the east side. The west wall of the nave is curved and the lobby is contained within two off-set curved walls at the front of the building. The cream brick walls are set on a red brick base, and incorporate contrasting red brick strips and panels and timber framed openings. A flat roof is concealed behind parapets and a horizontal canopy partly covers the curved entrance ramp. Two oversized horizontal steel beams span the building and project beyond it, supported on steel columns. Internally, tubular steel columns mark the window bays of the church nave. Exposed brickwork is used as an internal feature. Interior and exterior steel framework, downpipes and timber fascias were painted light blue.

The former chapel and the adjoining land was bought by the former City of Box Hill in 1991, and are now owned by the City of Whitehorse, repurposed for community use.

== See also ==
- List of Catholic churches in Australia
- Architecture of Melbourne
