= Maggie Edmond =

Australian architect

Maggie Edmond AM LFRAIA
- Born: Margaret Leonie Suchestow; 11 June 1946 (age 80); Melbourne, Victoria, Australia
- Education: University of Melbourne
- Occupation: Architect
- Spouse: Peter Corrigan
- Awards: Australian Institute of Architects Gold Medal 2003/2023; Enduring Architecture Award, 2003 & 2026; Victorian Architecture Medal, 1979 & 1995
- Practice: Edmond and Corrigan
- Buildings: Church of Resurrection 1977; School of Resurrection 1979; Chapel of St Joseph 1978; RMIT Building 8; Niagara Galleries
- Design: Fairfield Amphitheatre, 1985

Margaret Leonie Edmond AM (née Suchestow; born 11 June 1946) is an Australian architect.

== Education and formative years ==
As a child, Edmond's family lived in houses designed by notable Australian architects—the Bridgeford House in Black Rock, designed by Robin Boyd in 1953; and the Quamby apartments in South Yarra, designed by Roy Grounds. She has reflected on this upbringing, noting that "from a very early age I was aware that houses I had lived in differed from those of my friends".

Edmond studied architecture at University of Melbourne alongside her first husband, landscape architect Robin Edmond (1943–2008). She completed her Bachelor of Architecture in 1969.

== Career ==
In 1974, she formed a partnership with her husband Peter Corrigan to create the Melbourne-based architectural firm Edmond and Corrigan. She remains a principal of the firm, and manages and presents much of the work.

She was described by Neil Clerehan as "probably the nation's foremost female architect".

The first published projects of Edmond and Corrigan—the Edinburgh Gardens Pavilion (design completed 1977) and Patford House (design completed 1975) in Fitzroy—were developed by Edmond alone.

Edmond became a member of the Deakin University Council in 1999, acting as Deputy Chancellor from 2004 to 2007. She sits as chairperson of Deakin University's Campus Planning Committee.

In 2014, Edmond sat on the jury of the Houses Awards—an annual program to award Australia's best residential architecture projects.

== Awards and honours ==
=== Australian civil honours ===
Edmond was appointed a Member of the Order of Australia in the 2024 Australia Day Honours for her "significant service to architecture, to tertiary education, and to professional organisations".

=== Academic honours ===
Maggie Edmond was awarded an honorary Doctor of Architecture by the University of Melbourne on 21 March 2015.

=== Architecture honours ===
In 2001, she was awarded a Life Fellowship by the RAIA.

In 2023 she was recognised by the Victorian Chapter of the Institute of Architects with the Enduring Architecture Award becoming the named award, the Maggie Edmond Enduring Architecture Award, of which she won the inaugural award in 2003 for the 1978 Chapel of St Joseph.

In 2023 Edmond was awarded the Australian Institute of Architects Gold Medal, her name added 20 years after the same award was presented to her partner Peter Corrigan in 2003. At the 2023 National Awards she described the correction as 'restorative'.

Twenty years later, the Institute asked the 2023 Gold Medal Jury to consider whether there had been an oversight in acknowledging only one member of the duo whose longstanding collaboration was responsible for the practice of Edmond and Corrigan. The jury was undivided in its conclusion that the work celebrated in the 2003 Gold Medal was that of the partnership.

— Shannon Battisson on behalf of the 2023 Gold Medal Jury

In 2026 Maggie Edmond was awarded the 2026 Maggie Edmond Enduring Architecture Award for the 1985 built Fairfield Amphitheatre in Fairfield Park, Fairfield, Victoria.

== Personal life ==
Edmond is the daughter of Melbourne fashion designer Linda Suchestow.
