= Keilor Fire Station =

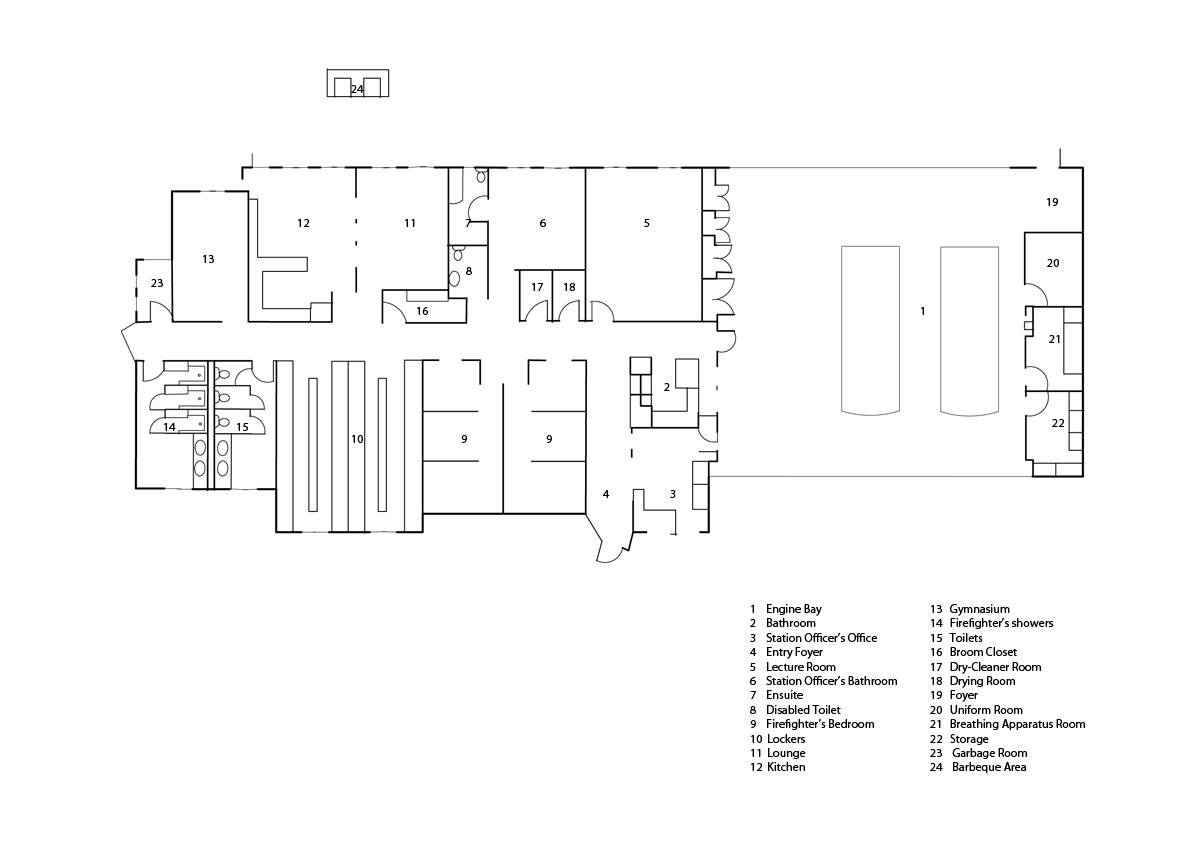
- Keilor Fire Station, Keilor East, Victoria
- Interactive map of the Keilor Fire Station area

General information
- Type: Fire Station
- Architectural style: Urban Domestic
- Location: Milleara Road, Keilor East, Victoria, Australia
- Coordinates: 37.74071°S 144.86330°E
- Completed: 1991

Design and construction
- Architect: Edmond & Corrigan
- Main contractor: Merchant Builders

Keilor Fire Station is the first in a series of three fire stations in suburban Melbourne, Victoria designed by Edmond and Corrigan. It is located in Milleara Road, Keilor East. Founded in the late 1970s, Edmond and Corrigan are widely recognised for their involvement in post-modern architecture focusing on Australian cultural factors. Their designs draw on different aspects that contribute to and shape society itself such as poetry, theatre, literature, dance and art combining particular influences to achieve a final architectural outcome. Peter Corrigan once said, "Buildings are informed by ideas… with generosity, intelligence and ambition".

== Description ==
An example of domestic architecture, Keilor Fire Station is a building that strives to communicate the role fire-fighters play in society through planning, layout shape, colour and materiality. The building is recognisable by a heavy tile roof and a tall jaunty corridor with clerestories along with large fascia. It is static in approach and self-contained. Textures and colour scheme were inspired by local housing in the surrounding environment, whilst also corresponding to specific fire fighting traits, such as flame red and apricot striped inverted lintels. Although Keilor Fire Station is set back from the street with limited access to the public, it is still clearly visible. This action has been interpreted as describing themes of self-sacrifice and heroism, with the building embodying an element of respect, providing a peaceful retreat for members of Melbourne Metropolitan Fire Brigade.

== Key influences and design approach ==
The design of Keilor Fire Station was restricted to certain requirements specific to Melbourne Metropolitan Fire Brigade regulations, providing limitations within which the building would fit. Some of these include garage area patterns, passageway and dormitory layouts. Another contributing factor influencing Keilor Fire Station's shaping was in relation to the earlier fire station positioned alongside, which was gradually demolished. The design approach for this building was focussed simultaneously on practicality and symbolic description, considering cultural relationship of fire stations with greater society.

== Gallery ==
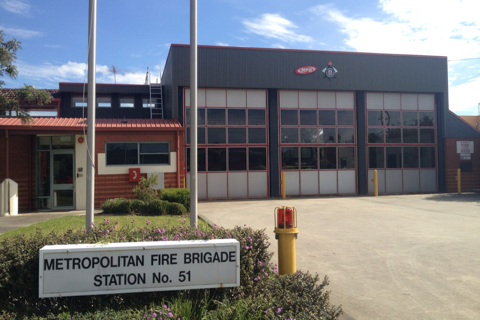
Entrance

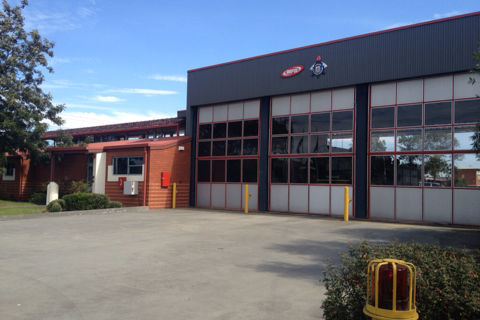
Keilor Fire Station

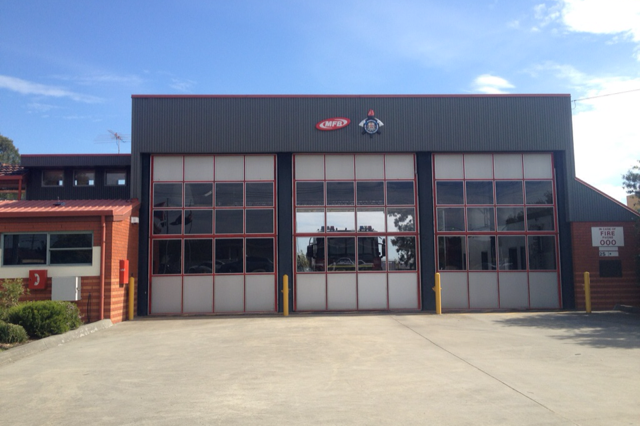
Keilor Fire Station
