= Niagara Galleries =

Art gallery in Richmond, Australia showing Modernist art

Coordinates: 37.820007°S 144.989912°E

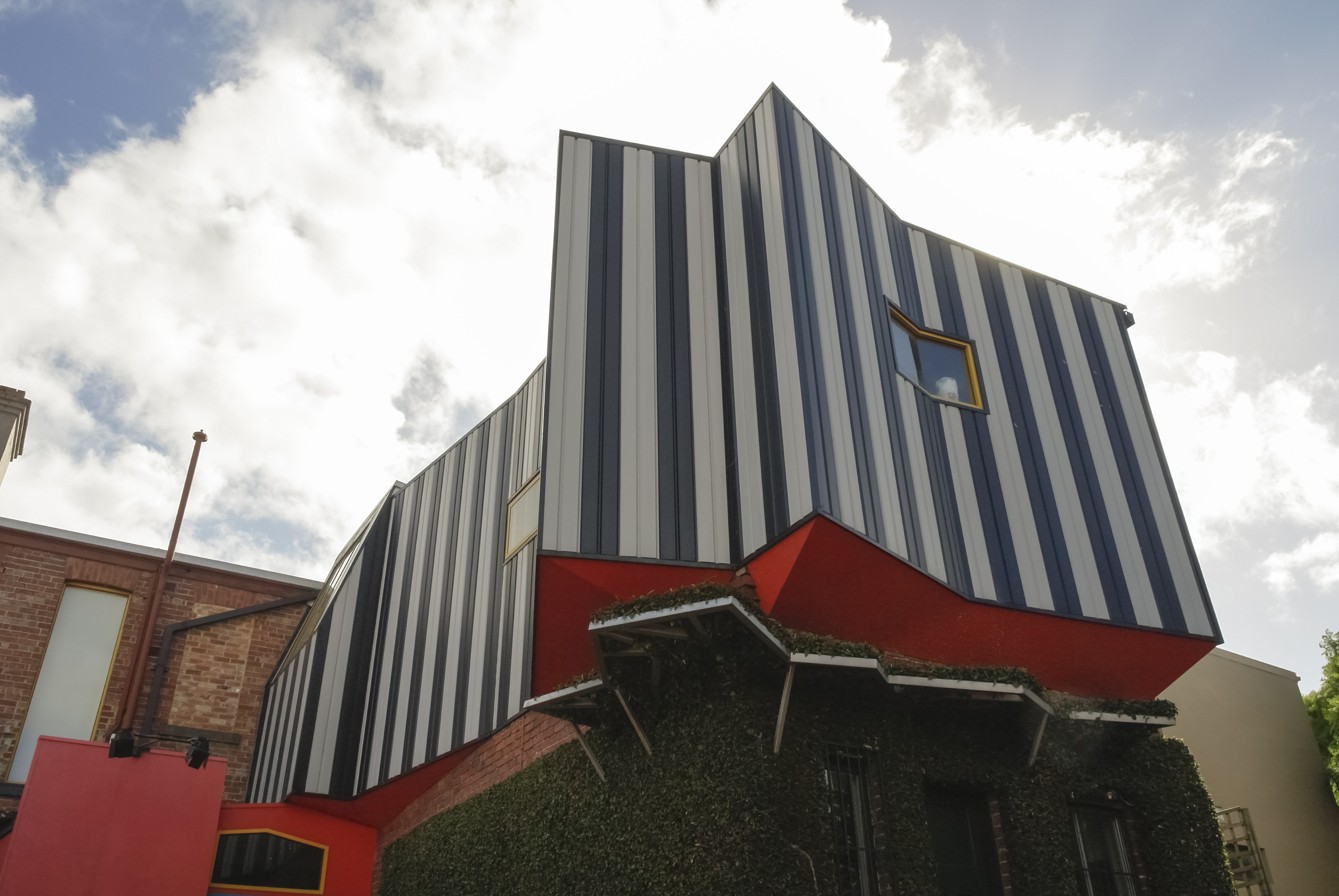
- Niagara Galleries, back entrance (2013)

General information
- Type: Gallery
- Architectural style: Postmodern
- Location: 245 Punt Road, Richmond, Australia

Technical details
- Floor area: 120 m^{2} (1,300 sq ft)

Design and construction
- Architecture firm: Edmond and Corrigan
- Main contractor: Builder: Claudius Pty Ltd
- Awards: Colorbond Award 2002

Other information
- Parking: At Rear

Website
- www.niagaragalleries.com.au

Niagara Galleries shows contemporary and Modernist Australian art in Richmond, an inner suburb of Melbourne, from a terrace which has been substantially remodelled in a postmodern style.

== History ==
The gallery was established by Kyneton High School friends Peter Gant and William Nuttall in 1978, and took its name from its location at 27 Niagara Lane in Melbourne. Over January and February 1983 the partners relocated the gallery to its current location at 245 Punt Road, Richmond, Victoria, after which Gant left the partnership, though still a director at the time of their landmark show of Ian Fairweather in October 1985. The gallery represents a stable of 51 artists and exhibits and sells painting, sculpture, photography and ceramics.

== Architecture ==
The gallery is housed in a Victorian building, now part of the Richmond Hill Heritage Overlay Area, originally built for worker accommodation, which in the 1880s was a rooming house and by 1960 was occupied by the Pacific Shoe Co. An addition to the rear by Edmond and Corrigan in contrasting postmodern style was built in 2002.

Edmond and Corrigan's remodelling of Niagara Galleries is a bold extension of the back of a simple white Victorian terrace. The main mass is of rectangular shape continuing the first floor of the existing building. An angular form that juts out towards the rear entrance of the site breaks up the regular and conservative shape. Its pointed angles over-hang the boundaries of the existing building to make a corner strikingly visible from the street. This upper level of the extension is clad daringly in black and white striped Colorbond over majority of the rear façade. This linear pattern is interrupted by carefully placed square windows highlighted with frames in vibrant yellow. This large section of black and white set off by the solid, strong red of the underneath of the over hang which extends to the new back entrance; a rectangular box with set-back door.

=== Key influences and design approach ===
The Niagara Galleries have been compared to RMIT Building 8 and the Victorian College of arts buildings also by Edmond and Corrigan as buildings that 'get known' for their design. Influences for this building are Corrigan's comprehensive position on architecture, apparent in a majority of his designs; that successful and exciting architecture needs to be 'difficult'. Within this project this is realised by challenging the conventional urban surroundings with contrasting and incongruous design. Corrigan's own interest in art has influenced the way he treated the exterior of the building, blurring the lines between what is art and what is architecture. In creating such a vibrant building Corrigan encourages an architectural dialogue with visual art audiences, even incorporating elements that reference Sidney Nolan's Ned Kelly 'The Chase' by placing abstract forms within traditional urban landscape as 'Nolan' did.

To personalise the design and allow it to relate to the business it houses Corrigan has chosen to mainly use black and white for the facade. These are the colours of Niagara Galleries corporate identity, but refer also to the client as a strong supporter of Collingwood Football Club.

With this design Corrigan wanted to make a strong and positive statement about the selling of art, rejecting transactions that historically had been "done behind closed doors". This influences the plan of the extension, as the private viewing room for staff and buyers is quite a large and an open space, and the dominant façade supports this statement.

=== Awards ===
Niagara Galleries was awarded the Chapter BHP Colorbond Award in 2002 and the Dulux Colour Awards, Commercial Exterior Winner, 2002.

== Images ==
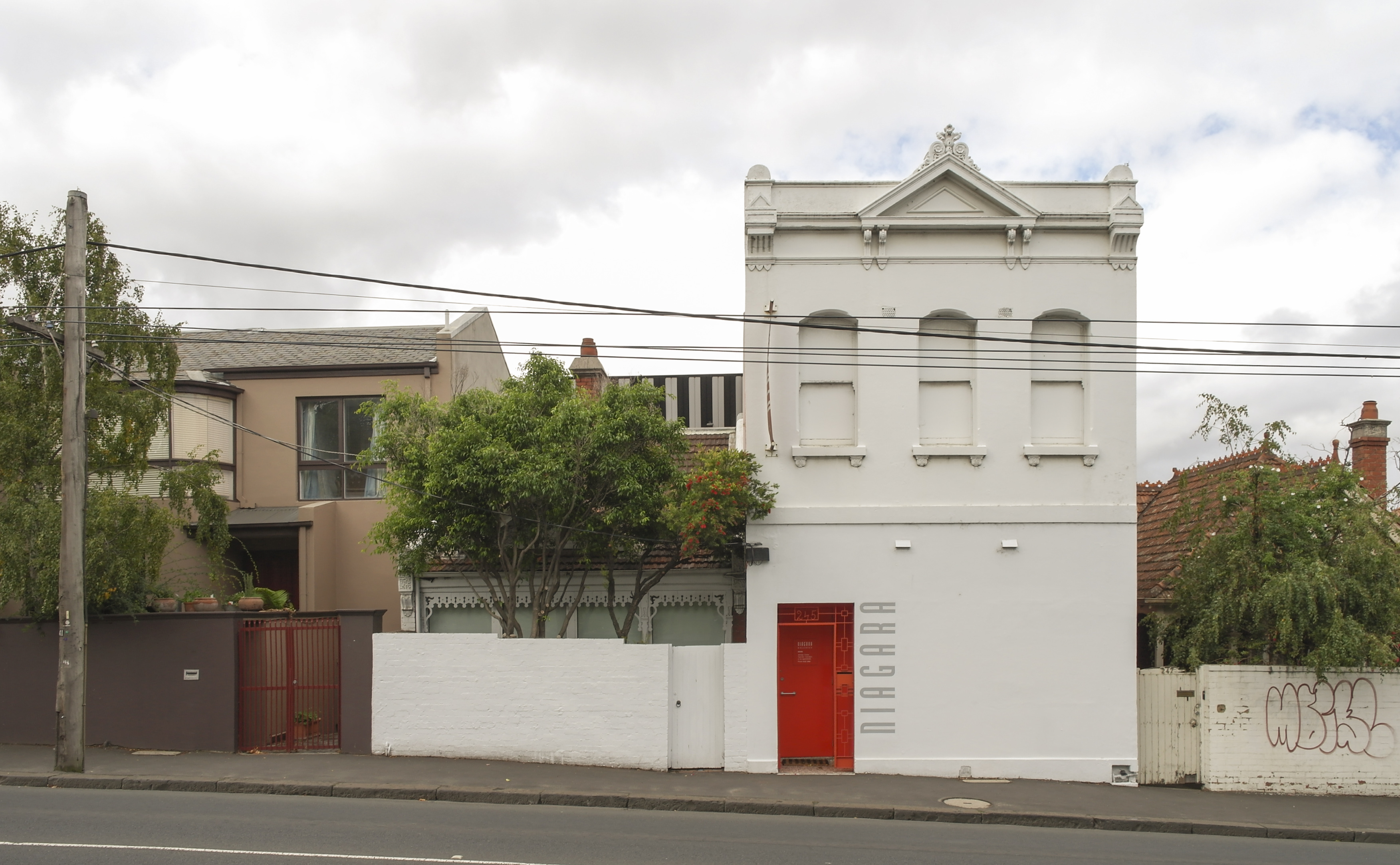
Niagara Galleries, Front Entrance.

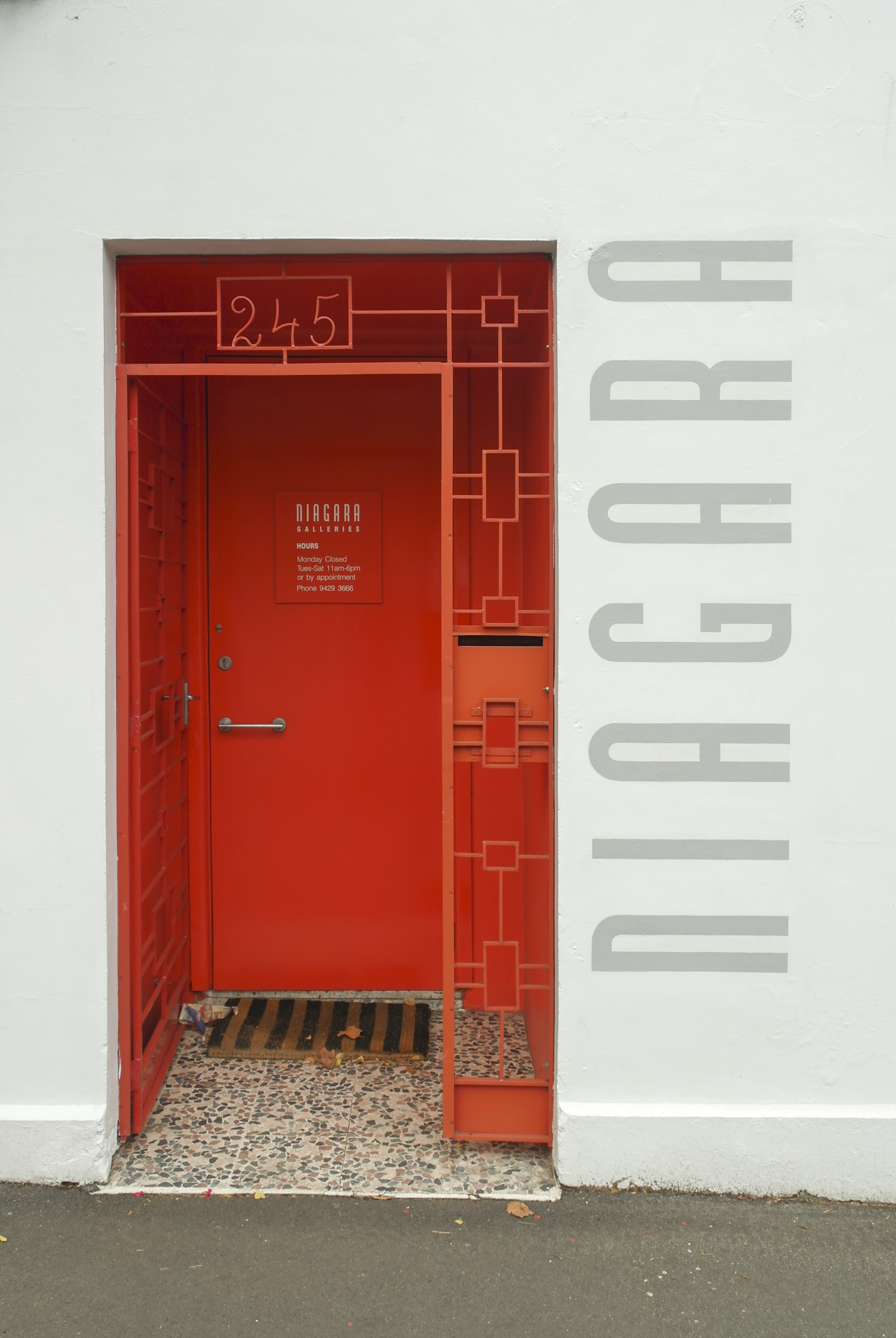
Main Entrance to Niagara Galleries from Punt Road.

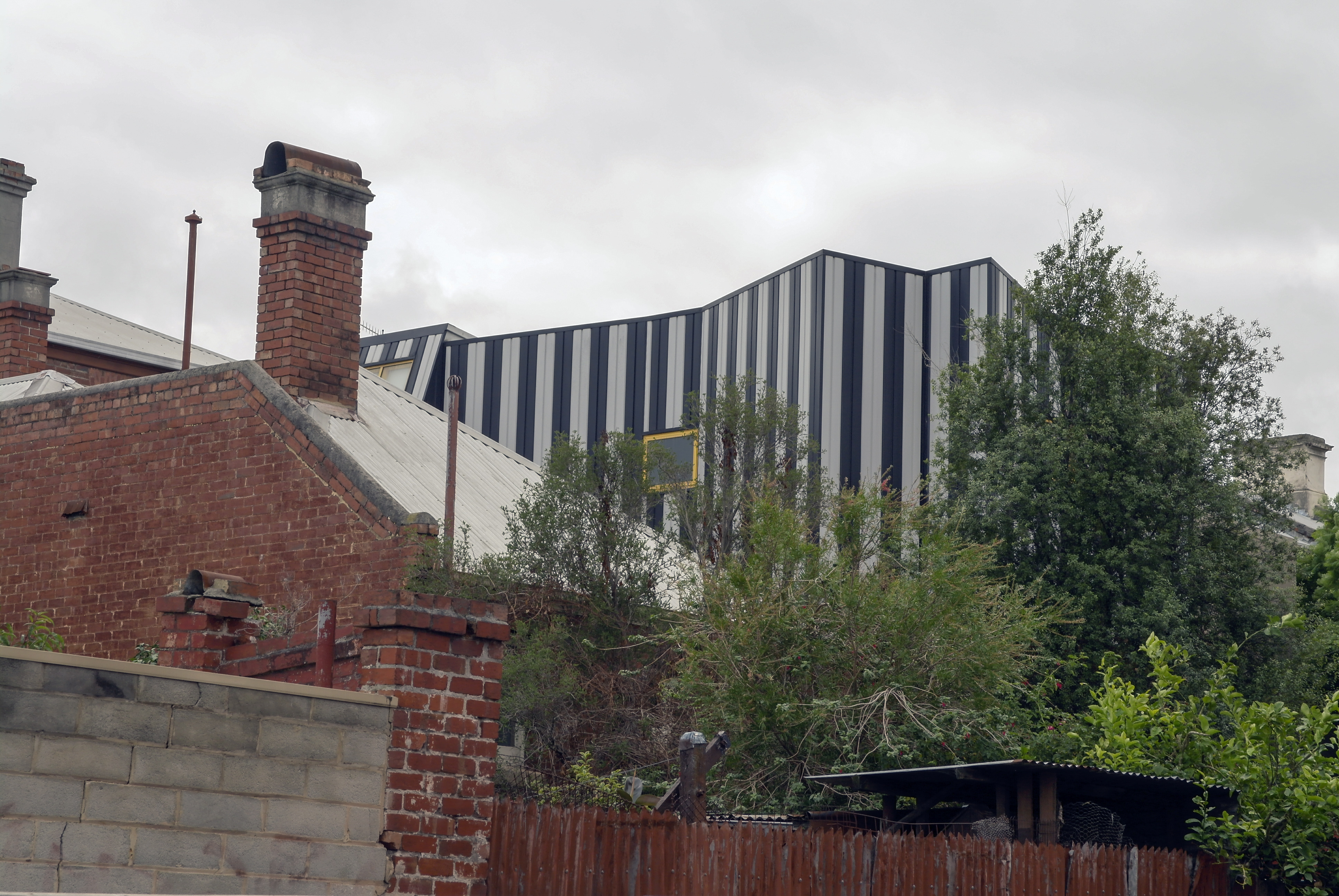
Rowena Parade View of Niagara Galleries.

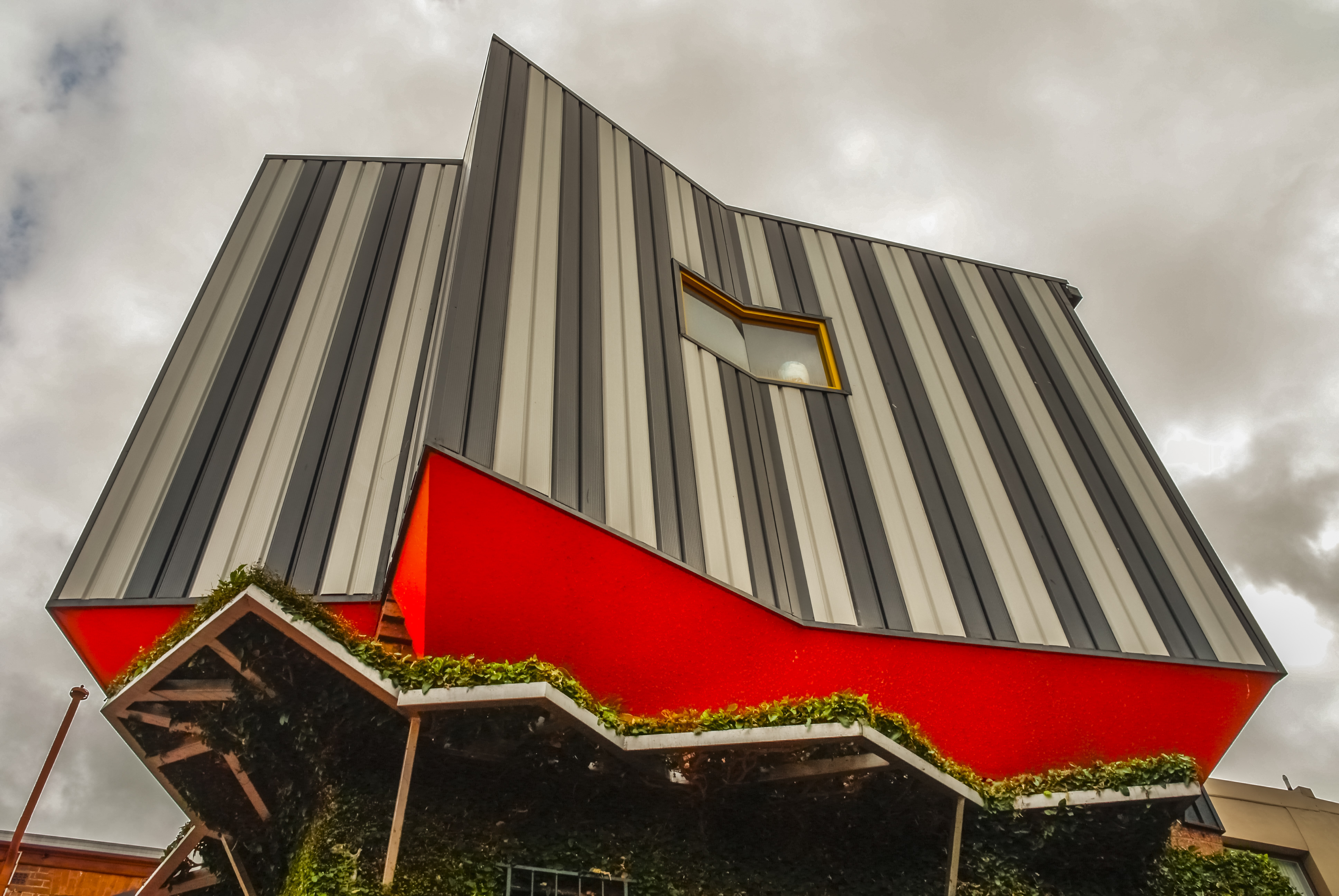
Red Detail of Niagara Galleries extension designed by Edmond and Corrigan.

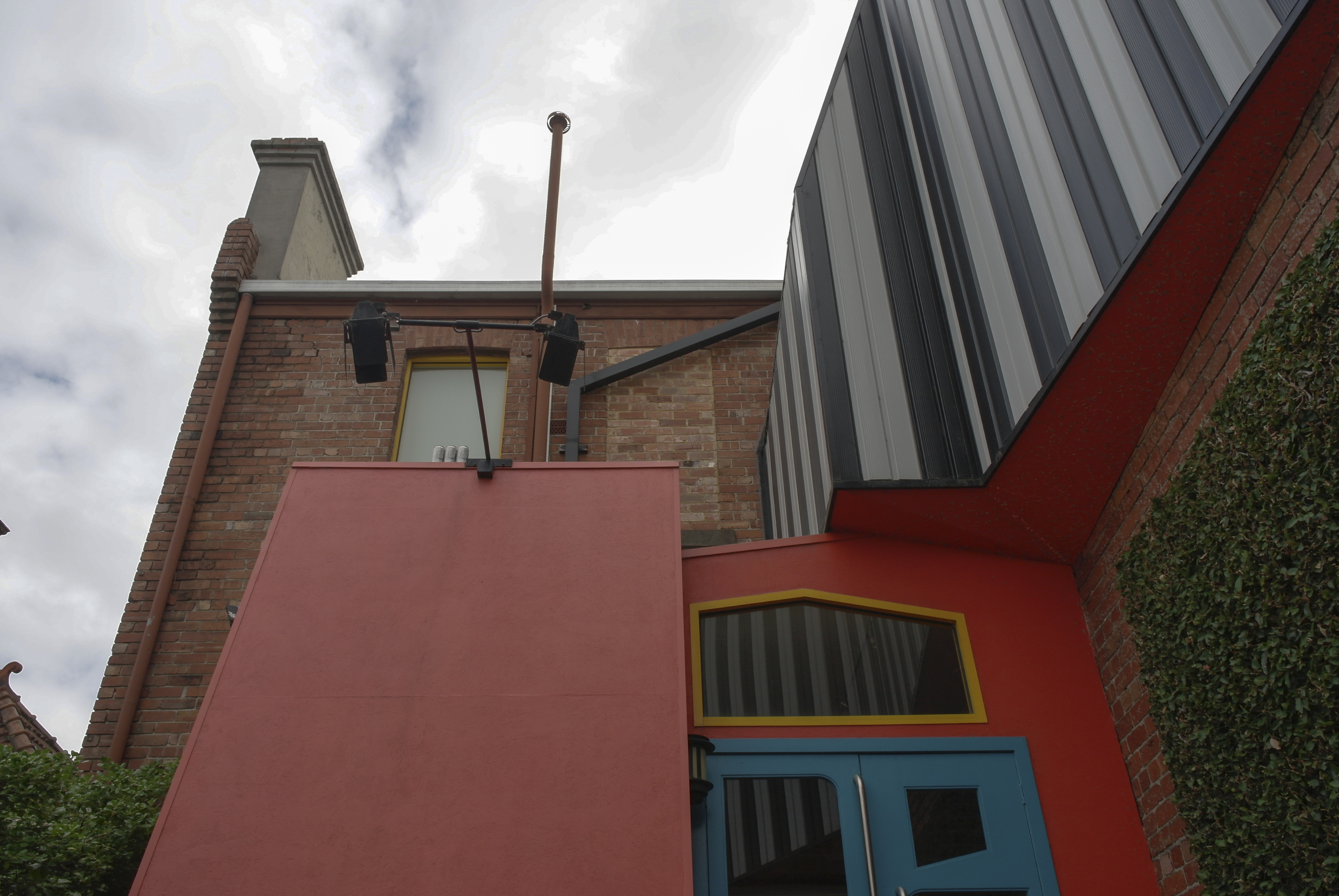
Back Entrance to the Niagara Galleries with Old and New Sections.

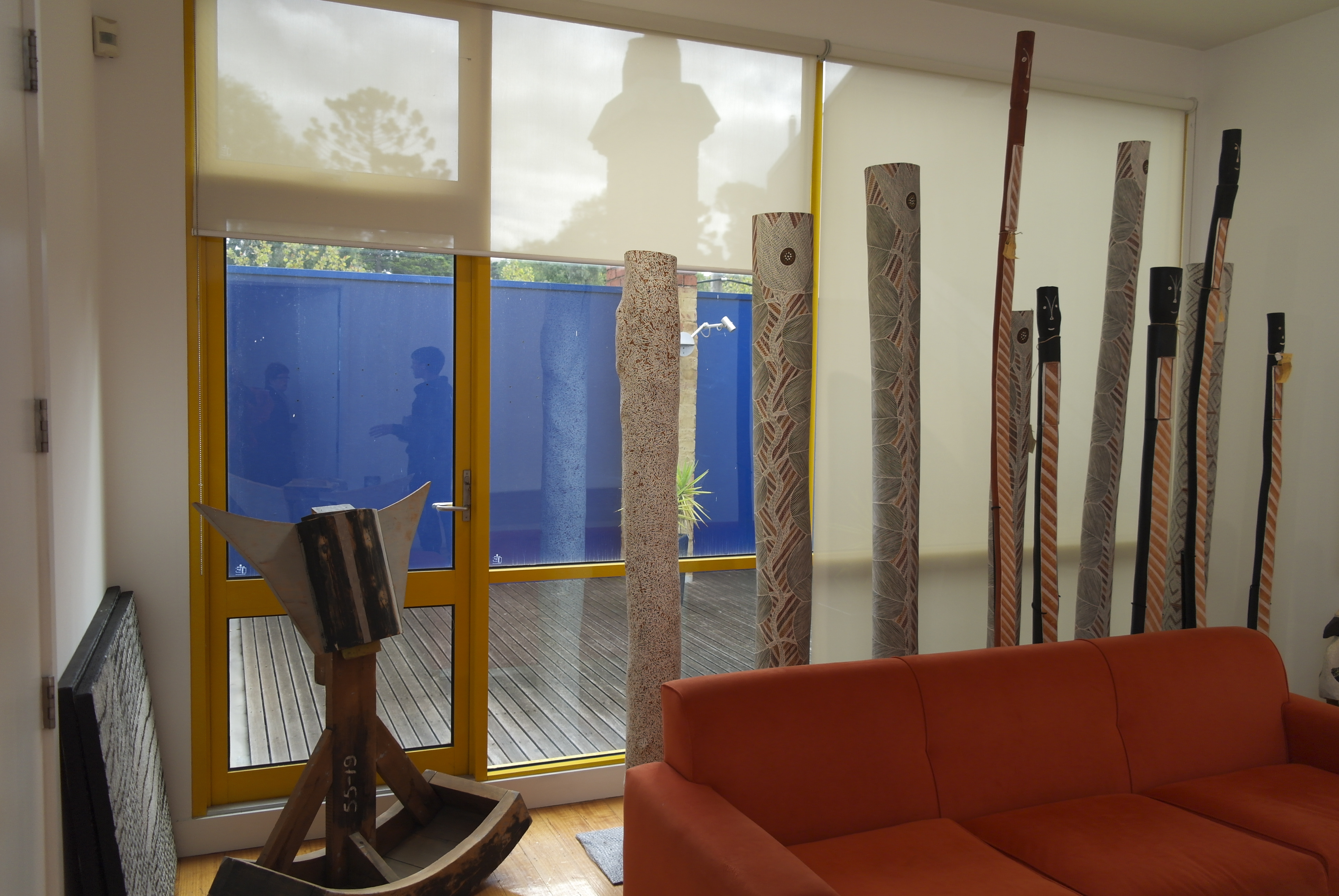
A Private Courtyard in Niagara Galleries, a part of the new extension by Edmond and Corrigan.

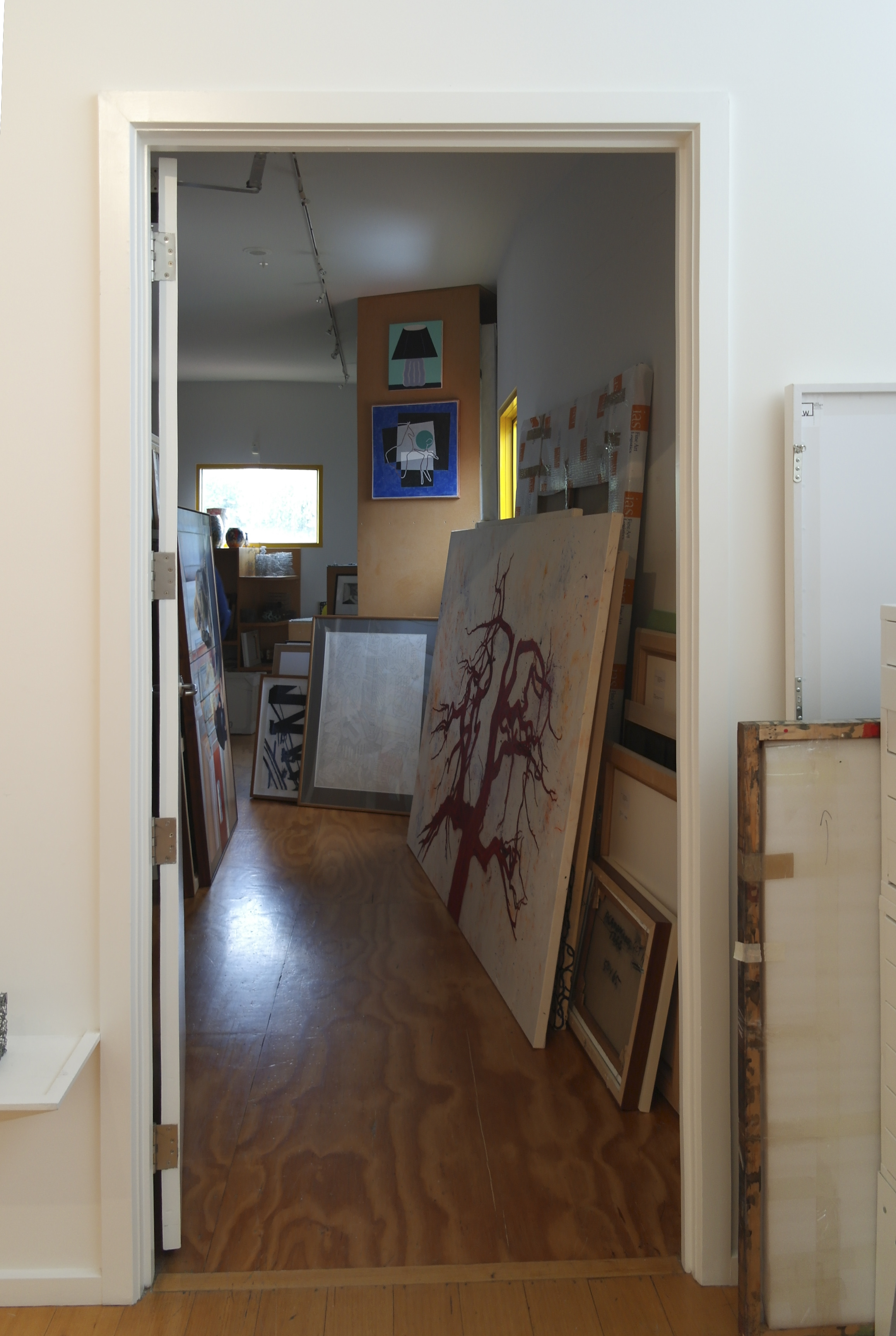
Interior view of Niagara Galleries.
