= Peter Corrigan =

Australian architect (1941–2016)

Adjunct Professor Peter Corrigan AM
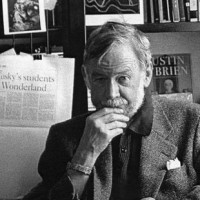
- Born: 6 May 1941; Daylesford, Victoria, Australia
- Died: 1 December 2016 (aged 75); Carlton North, Victoria, Australia
- Education: Christian Brothers College, St Kilda; Melbourne University; Yale University
- Occupation: Architect
- Spouse: Maggie Edmond
- Awards: Australian Institute of Architects Gold Medal 2003/2023; Enduring Architecture Award, 2003; Victorian Architecture Medal, 1979 & 1995
- Practice: Edmond and Corrigan
- Buildings: Church of Resurrection, 1977 & School of Resurrection, 1979; Chapel of St Joseph, 1978; RMIT Building 8, 1994; Niagara Galleries, 2001; VCA Drama School, 2004

Peter Russell Corrigan AM (6 May 1941 – 1 December 2016) was an Australian architect and was involved in the completion of works in stage and set design.

== Background ==
=== Education ===
Corrigan was educated at Christian Brothers College, St Kilda and then completed his degree in architecture, in 1966 at Melbourne University. He further pursued his studies at Yale University in 1969, completing a master's degree in Environmental Design.

=== Architecture career ===
After working for Philip Johnson, Paul Rudolf, César Pelli and Kevin Roche in New Haven, he returned to Australia in 1974 where he formed his practice, Edmond and Corrigan, a partnership with his wife, Maggie Edmond, initiated in 1975. As a part of Edmond and Corrigan, they won 35 RAIA state awards and four Australian National Architecture Awards.

=== Academic career ===
Corrigan was a Professor of Architecture at RMIT University and taught architectural design and history for over 30 years. He marked his name as an internationally renowned architect, theatre designer, author and academic, based in Melbourne. He completed costume set design for numerous productions in Australia including Hoopla Productions, Opera Australia, the Australian Performing Group, Melbourne Theatre Company, Last Laugh Theatre Restaurant, Playbox Theatre, Anthill, Going Through Stages, Nightshift, Victoria State Opera, South Australian Theatre Company, Queensland Lyric, Gilgul Theatre Company (Theatre of Principle), Belvoir Street Theatre, Sydney Theatre Company and The Bell Shakespeare Company.

He had an enduring interest in architectural history and culture and collected an internationally significant large private library of architectural books, including many rare works on drawing and design. Corrigan's extensive collection of books and periodicals related to architecture and design was left to RMIT University Library after his death.

In 1983–84 Corrigan was a guest professor at Graduate School of Design Harvard University, Boston, Massachusetts, and in 1991 he was a guest lecturer at the Polytechnic University of Turin, Italy. In the same year he was promoted at the Third Belgrade Triennial of World Architecture exhibition in Galerija Kulturmog Centra Beograda "39 prominent architects of the world". Likewise the work of Edmond and Corrigan has been exhibited internationally in 1991, 1999 and 2002 at the Venice Biennale of Architecture.

He obtained his honorary Doctor of Architecture in 1989, for his contribution to Australian Architectural theory and design. Further Adjunct Professor in 1989, at Royal Melbourne Institute of Technology (RMIT).

=== Cities of Hope Exhibition ===
An exhibition of Corrigan's life work was held at RMIT Gallery in 2013 entitled Cities of Hope. It traced the "creative focus of this remarkable Australian architect, bringing to life many of his designs over four decades including architectural models and drawings by Edmond and Corrigan; set and costume designs for theatre; artworks, records and notations from his personal collection and key works selected from public collections which have enriched his practice". This material has since been donated to the RMIT Design Archives and RMIT Library respectively.

== Recognition ==
=== Australian civil honours ===
On 9 June 2008 Peter Corrigan was recognised as a Member of the Order of Australia (AM) "for service to architecture as an academic, educator and practitioner and to the arts, particularly through theatre production design."

=== Architecture honours ===
In 2003 Peter Corrigan was awarded the Australian Institute of Architects Gold Medal, albeit with his partner Maggie Edmond notably overlooked, when other firms or partnerships had been awarded as a group, including Denton Corker Marshall in 1996 and Gilbert Nicol and Ross Chisholm in 1983. Maggie Edmond was added to the award twenty years later at the Australian National Architecture Awards in Canberra, on 31 October 2023.

In 2013 Corrigan was awarded the Neville Quarry Architectural Education Prize. The jury citation described his teaching;

"At a time when education emphasises the acquisition of skills, Peter Corrigan holds to the idea of educating the whole person. He has done so not only by teaching in a manner tailored to individual students, but also by embedding students in the culture of their field. Regardless of the theme of the design studio, students are pointed toward the activities of the local scene – the performance of a play, an exhibition or a big game at the MCG. In the larger world of ideas they are exposed to everyone from W. B. Yeats to Allen Ginsberg, from the Renaissance to contemporary politics. The results of this process are students who feel immersed in a culture and begin to sense their own place in it. Peter Corrigan teaches architecture in order to make good architects."

== Key projects ==
=== Chapel of St Josephs, 1978 ===
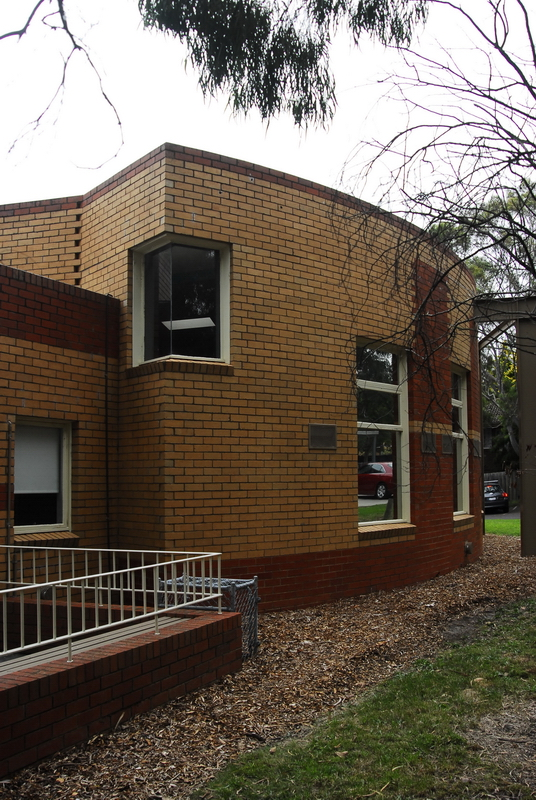
Chapel of St Josephs

The Chapel of St Josephs is located at 27–29 Strabane Avenue, Mont Albert North and is located in the middle of the site with an inflected curve plan. A long curved ramp from the street provides access to the building. The car park is located at the back of the building which provides space to view the building in the round, as one drives through.

The chapel is a postmodern, three-dimensional solid brick building, with a flat-roofed canopy that is the most significant feature of the building. The use of red and cream brick creates subtle highlighted architectural effects not only on the front façade, but also within its surrounds. The timber framed rectangular north-east facing windows, with the identical sized windows to the right of the curved wall, brings about a dynamic contrast to the mostly curved-shaped building.

The chapel won the RAIA Victorian Chapter Merit Award for Outstanding Architecture, New Buildings Category in 1983. Later it won the RAIA (Victorian Chapter) inaugural 25 Year Award in 2003.

=== RMIT Building 8, 1996 ===
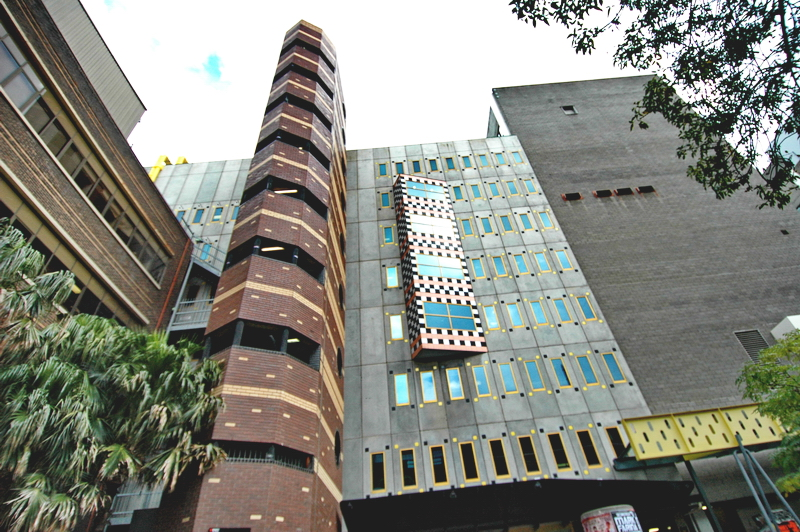
RMIT Building 8

The RMIT Building 8 built in 1993, is one of Corrigan's most recognised buildings, and "combines the bold vision and whimsical style that is Corrigan's trademark". It is located in Swanston street Melbourne at the University of RMIT. The building creates characteristics of its own along with its structure, several colours and situated materials. Built on a budget with tough constraints, the designing of building 8 needed to accommodate buildings below and next door as it is currently sitting on top of John Andrew’s unfinished union building. Following the construction of Building 8 it was found necessary to include a "new lift and service core" to allow access to the upper floors. In addition to this "the deep floor plate" was also maximised allowing further developed for rooms located on the upper floors. Detail within the interior such as "balustrades and hand railing" have been positioned in a way giving the building a unique yet chaotic sentiment. Noticeable along the streetscape of Swanston street, Building 8's roof gives the building part of its individuality. The positioning of the multiple roof structures, form and materiality make this building unique. The building structure also provides examples of many different uses of materials for different areas, some of which include "coloured stone facades, steel pipe strut supports and a polychrome and polygon brick" shown within parts of the building, all of which affect RMIT's atmosphere.

=== Readings Bookshop, 2005—2012 ===
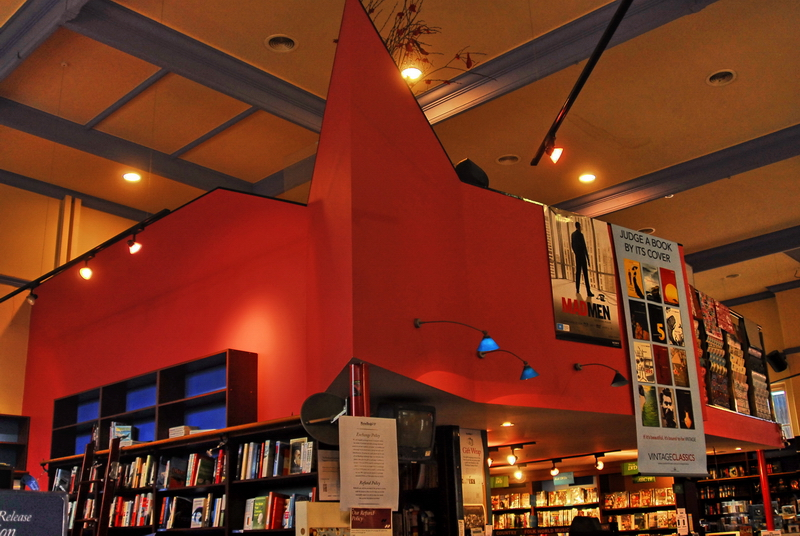
Readings Book Shop

The Readings Bookshop was located in the heritage listed Port Melbourne Post Office, built in 1910, which underwent renovation as a bookshop and completed in 2005 and located at 253 Bay Street, Port Melbourne. The interior included a mezzanine and a freestanding form in the middle of the room, designed with sharp angles and flat surfaces, it filled the interior of the bookshop. Surrounding the room were bookshelves up to the first floor. The bookshop closed in 2012.

== List of projects ==
=== Edmond & Corrigan ===
- Church of the Resurrection, Keysborough, 1976: RAIA Victoria Chapter Housing Merit Award, 1981
- Freedom Club Childcare Centre: Keysborough, 1977
- School of Resurrection, Keysborough, 1978: Victorian Architecture Medal, 1979
- Kew House, 1982; RAIA Victoria Chapter Housing Merit Award
- Office of Edmond & Corrigan, 46 Little Latrobe Street, Melbourne, 1986
- Athan House: Monbulk, Victoria, 1986–1988
- Dandenong College of TAFE, Stage 3, 1985–1988: RAIA Commendation for Public Architecture (National Award), 1989
- RMIT Building 8, 1993: Victorian Architecture Medal, 1995
- Ringwood Plaza, 1994: RAIA Victoria Chapter Award new institutional public buildings and award for urban design, 1995
- Exhibition Centre, Showground Stage 2, 1997: RAIA Victoria Chapter award of merit, 1997
- Lehrer Residence: RAIA Victoria Chapter Award of Merit, 2000
- Niagara Galleries, Richmond, Victoria, 2001: Colorbond Steel Award, 2002
- Academic Centre Newman College and St Mary's College, 2002
- Victorian College of the Art, School of Drama, 2004 in association with Castles Stephenson & Turner
- Lux House alteration: front porch, 2005
- Readings Bookshop, South Melbourne, 2005
