= RMIT Building 8 =

Coordinates: 37.808663°S 144.963647°E

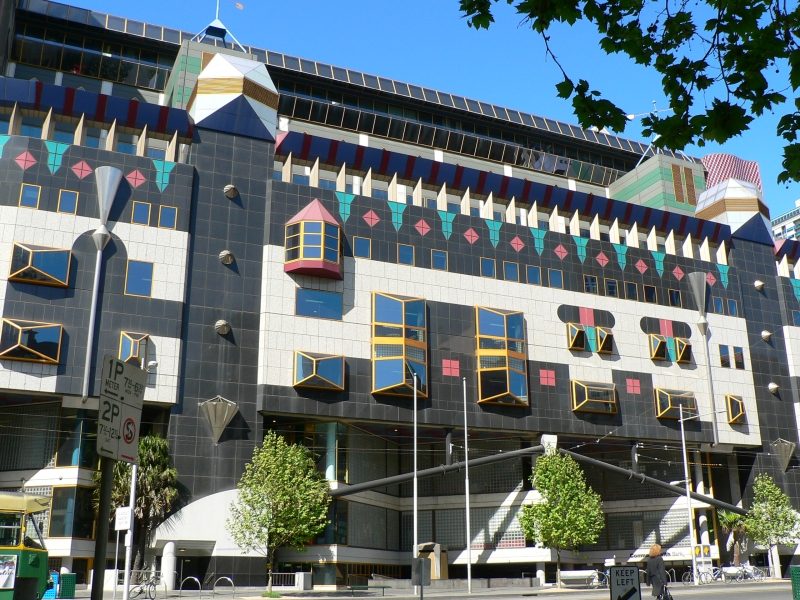
- Swanston Street frontage of Building 8
- Interactive map of the RMIT Building 8 area

General information
- Type: Education
- Architectural style: Postmodern
- Location: 383 Swanston Street, Melbourne, Victoria, Australia
- Completed: 1993
- Owner: RMIT

Technical details
- Floor count: 9
- Lifts/elevators: 3

Design and construction
- Architecture firm: Edmond and Corrigan
- Awards: RAIA Walter Burley Griffin Award for Urban Design, 1995 (National); Victorian Architecture Medal, 1995; Award for Institutional Alterations and Extensions, 1995; City of Melbourne Award for Institutional Buildings, 1995

RMIT Building 8 is an educational building, part of RMIT University's City campus in Melbourne, Victoria. It is located at 383 Swanston Street, on the northern edge of Melbourne's central business district.

Completed in 1993, by Edmond and Corrigan Pty Ltd in association with The Demaine Partnership, Building 8 is noted for its highly eclectic and ornamented design that draws from Melbourne history, and is considered one of the city's most prominent examples of postmodern architecture.

== Description ==
Standing 9 storeys tall, the building has a colourful postmodern facade that incorporates various elements such as stone of various colours, exposed piping and struts, as well as polychromatic brickwork of various shapes. Visually, Building 8 also shares a similar aesthetic to other buildings Peter Corrigan has designed, such as his Athan House as well as the Victorian College of the Arts

While Building 8's front-facing facade opens out into Swanston Street, its rear entrance connects it to Bowen Street, the primary thoroughfare running through the campus. Its rear facade is similarly decorated as well, a concrete face interspersed by coloured windows, and protrusions consisting of several windows and a service core. On the interior, the building shares much of the aesthetic that comprises its exterior, eschewing a traditional rectangular plan in favour of a more chaotic, polygonal layout. Its details are finished in a similar polychromatic, postmodern fashion. While the floors in Building 8 are relatively uniformly stratified, studios on the top floor have double or triple heighted ceilings to introduce a greater sense of space. Likewise, several rooms such as the lecture theatre and Swanston Library span several floors within the building.

As part of the RMIT City campus, Building 8 houses many university functions, containing the Swanston Library, Student Union, and schools of Architecture, Interior Design, Landscape Building, Planning & Policy, Fashion, and Mathematics. It also contains facilities such as workshops, computer and photography labs, as well as access to rapid prototyping equipment. While the building is open to the public, use of services such as printing or library loans may require the use of a student issued identity card. Similarly, access doors to and within Building 8 may be locked outside of office hours, requiring an identity card to unlock. Building 8 is serviced by three lifts as well as a combination of staircases and escalators, and was also constructed over the top of the existing Union Building built by John Andrews. As the Union Building was already showing signs of load failure, this called for the creation of a special light-weight granite curtain wall facade in order to minimize weight as much as possible.

== Key influences and design approach ==
As an example of Postmodern architecture, Building 8, in particular its facade, is a combination of various design elements borrowed from Melbourne's history. From Walter Burley Griffin, to Melbourne's Manchester Unity Building and Block Arcade, Building 8 is a pastiche of various influences. Colour is used liberally as well, setting it apart from the more reserved condition of existing buildings lining Swanston Street. As described in an architect's statement,

"The aim was to delight and break down the dominant and seamless city-wall 'mood' RMIT presented on Swanston Street.
The building's front, side and rear elevations create a whole from fragments and a collage of design 'ideas'. It presents itself to the city on its own terms."

== Gallery ==
Polychromatic windows

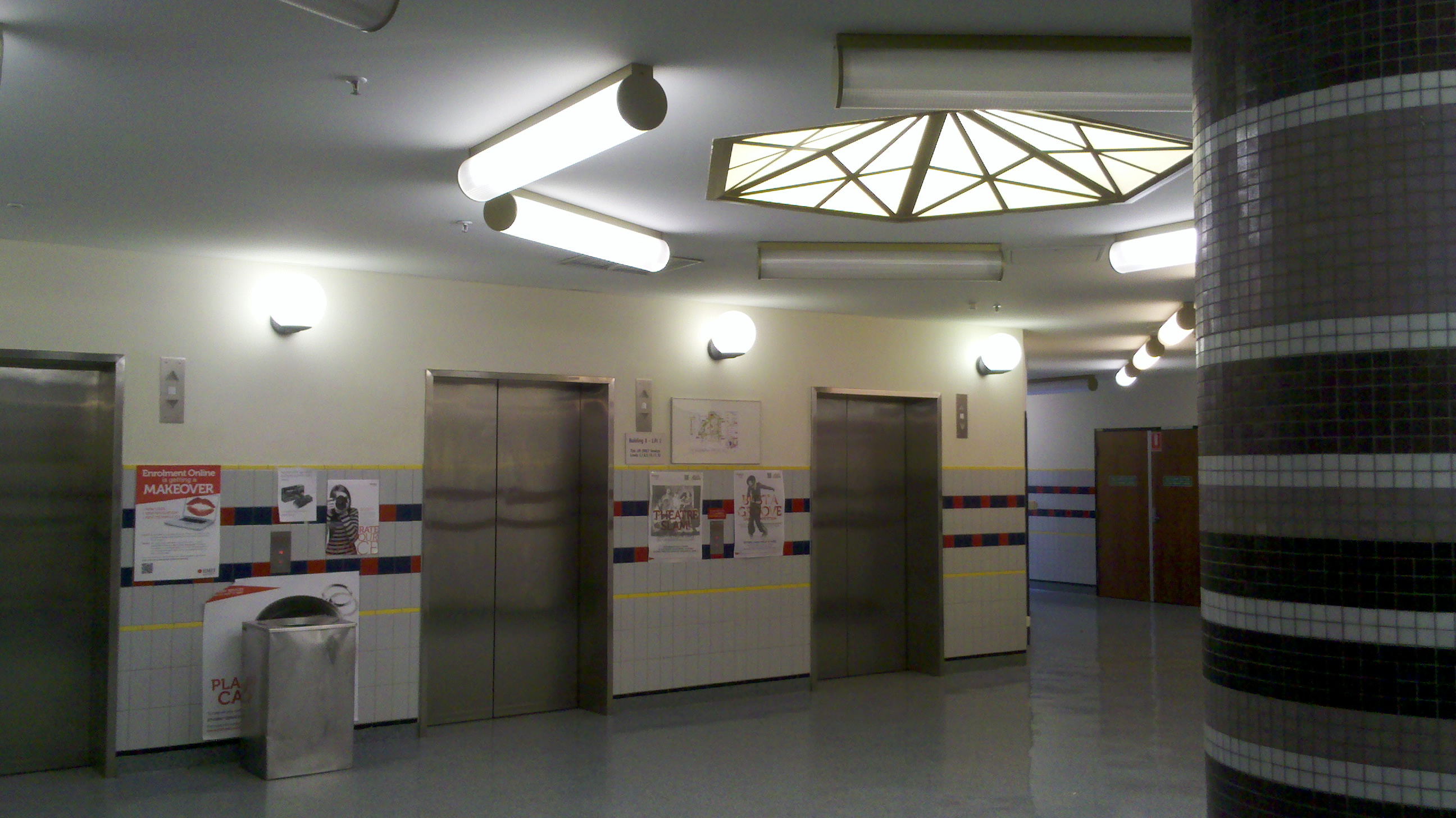
Lift lobby. Note the design of interior lighting fixtures and tiling on the column.

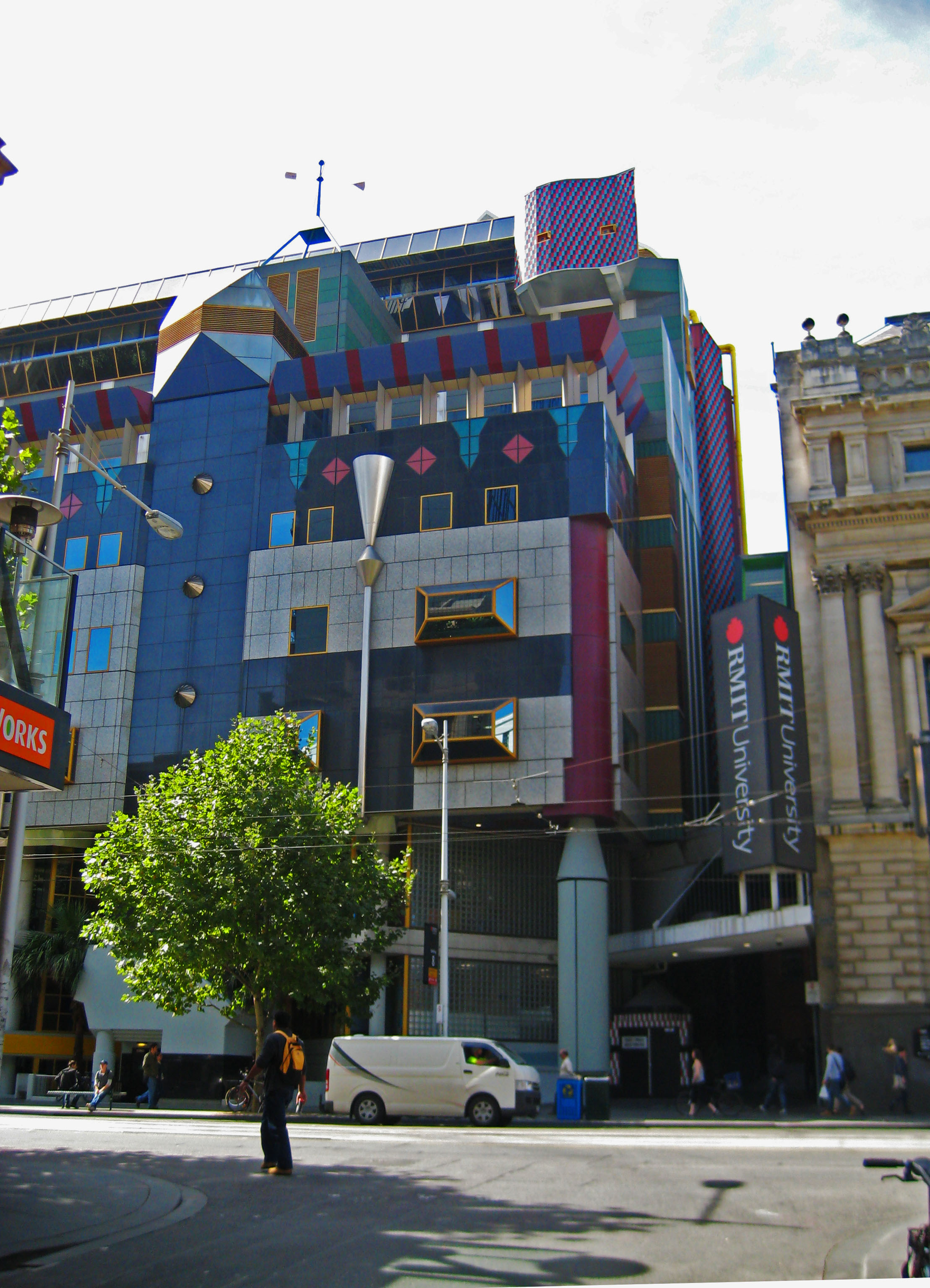
Building 8 next to Storey Hall on Swanston Street

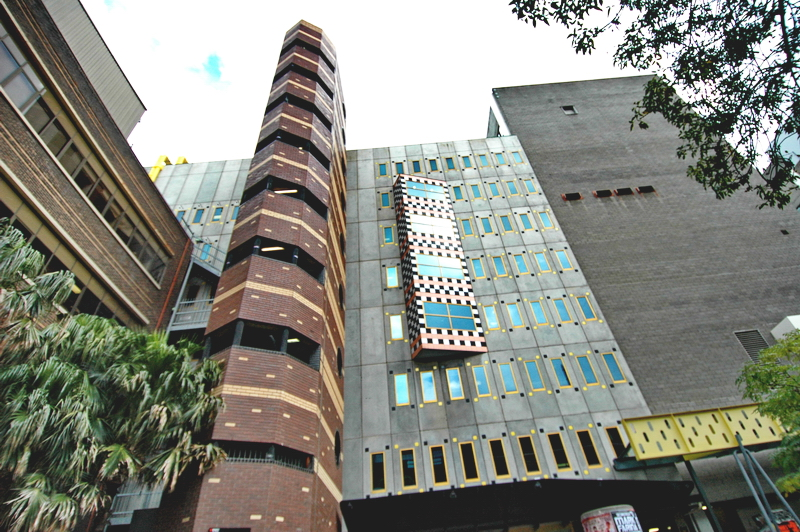
Rear of Building 8, as viewed from Bowen Street

== Awards ==
- RAIA Walter Burley Griffin National Award for Urban Design, 1995
- RAIA Victorian Chapter Award for Institutional Alterations & Extensions, 1995
- RAIA Victorian Architecture Medal, 1995
- City of Melbourne Award for Institutional Buildings, 1995

== See also ==
- RMIT University
- Peter Corrigan
- Edmond and Corrigan (Architectural Firm)
