= Edmond and Corrigan =

Melbourne based Australian architectural firm

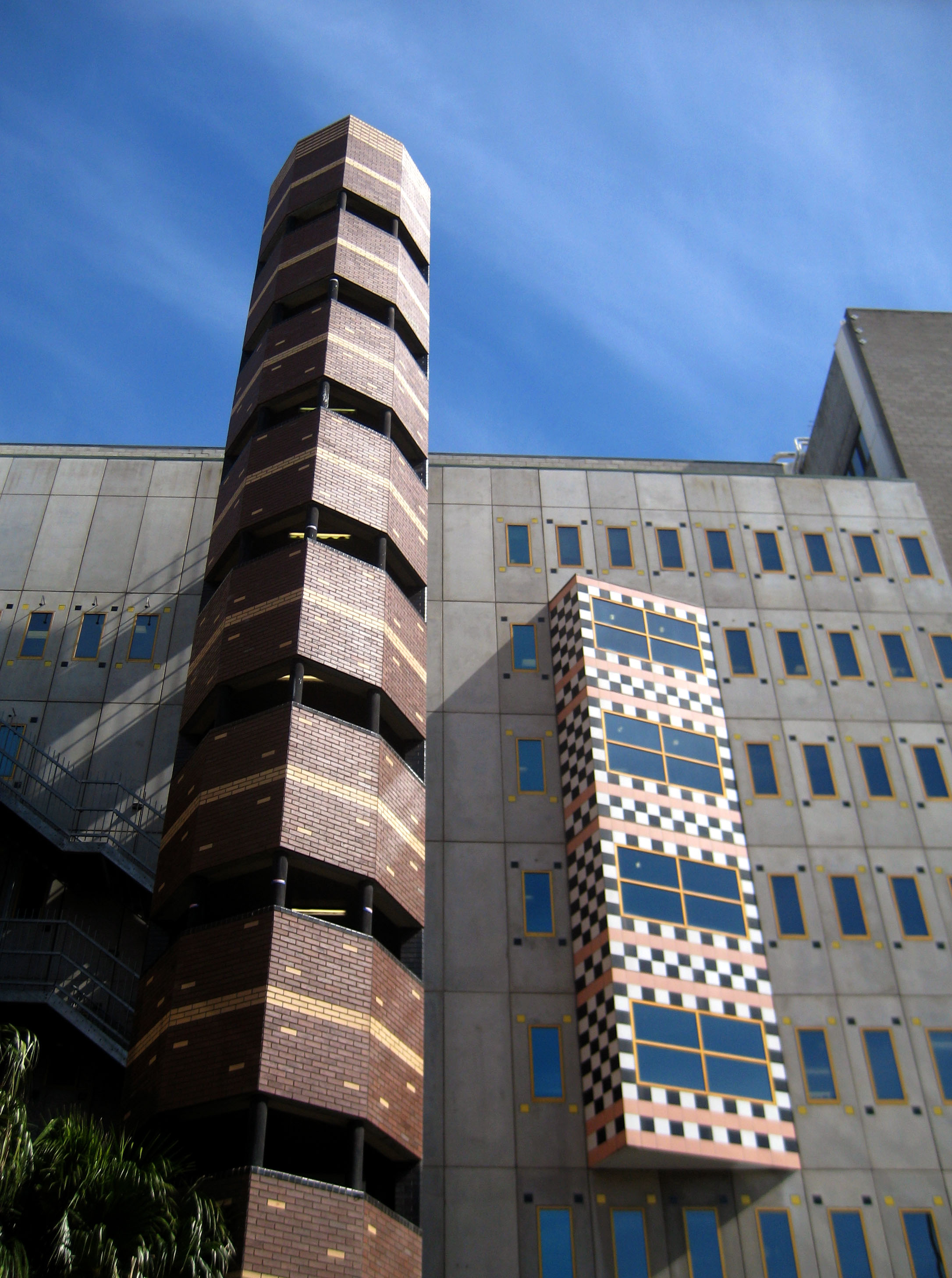
Building 8 of RMIT, as seen from Bowen Lane

Edmond and Corrigan is an Australian architectural firm based in Melbourne, Victoria, founded in the late 1970s by partners Maggie Edmond and Peter Corrigan, the firm's principals. The practice's work, both built and written, has been widely associated with the emergence of architectural postmodernism in Australia, an interest in suburbia and a search for an Australian architectural identity. Peter Corrigan taught design studios at RMIT University for over 30 years, until his death in December 2016.

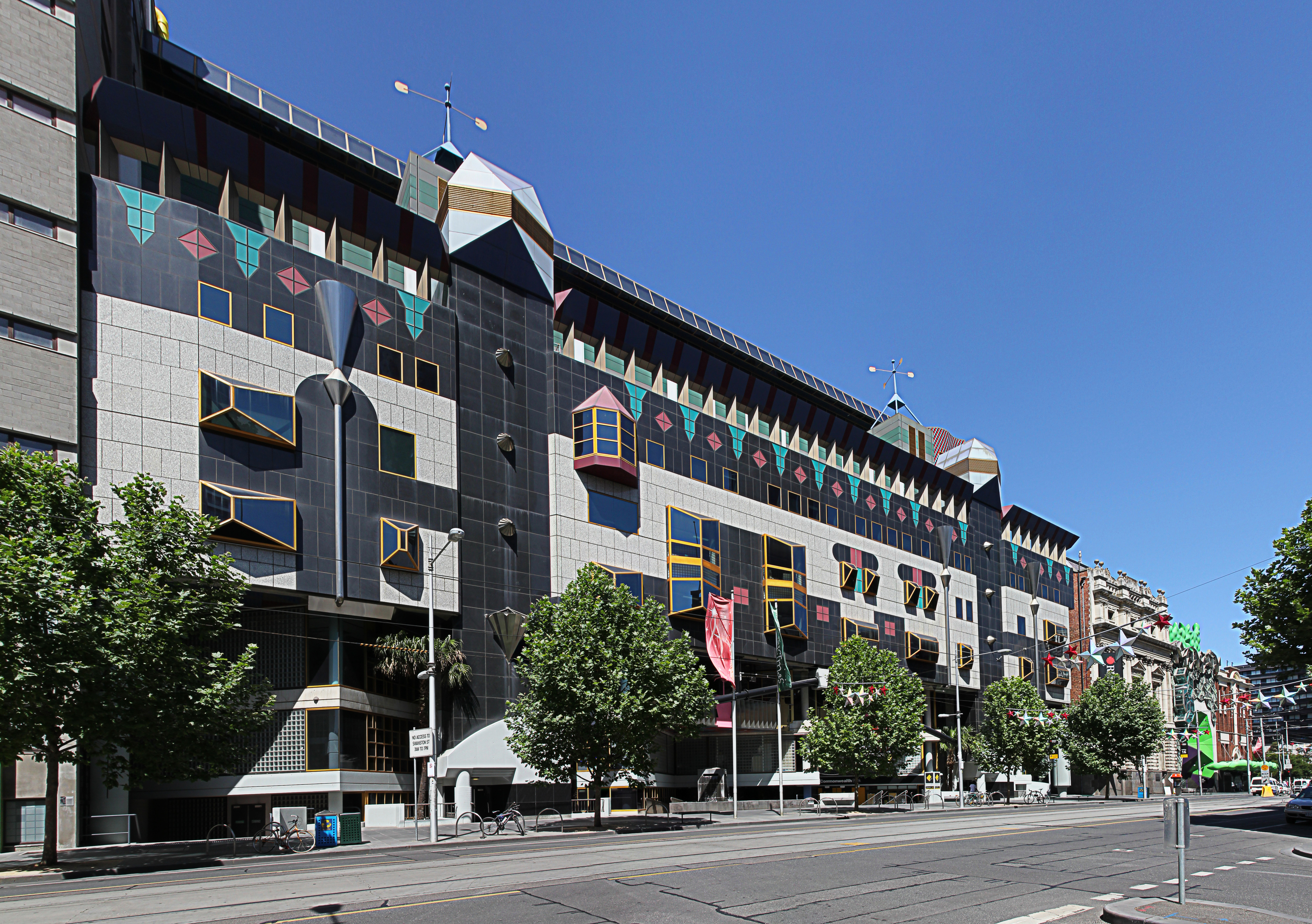
RMIT Building 8, as seen from Swanston Street

== Architectural practice ==
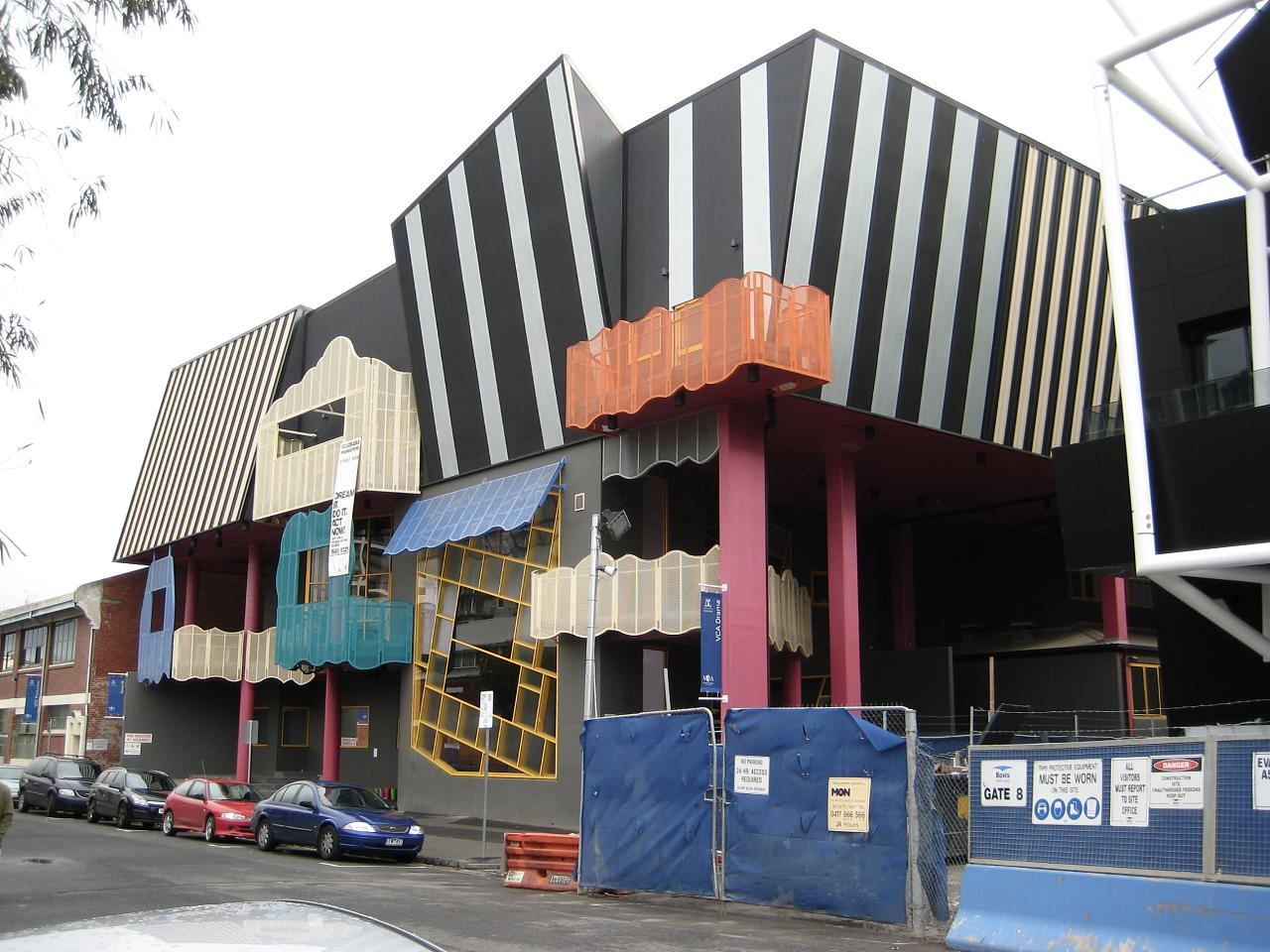
The VCA Theatre building in Southbank, Melbourne

The practice of Edmond and Corrigan was officially formed in 1975, though the pair had gradually been collaborating and associating on projects after Corrigan's return from America in 1974. Much of their early work consisted of church buildings and community buildings for the Catholic communities of suburban Melbourne.

They designed the Keysborough Church of the Resurrection, completed in 1977, and later buildings in Keysborough. The project was published in 1977. The School of the Resurrection, Keysborough was awarded the Victorian Architecture Medal in 1979.

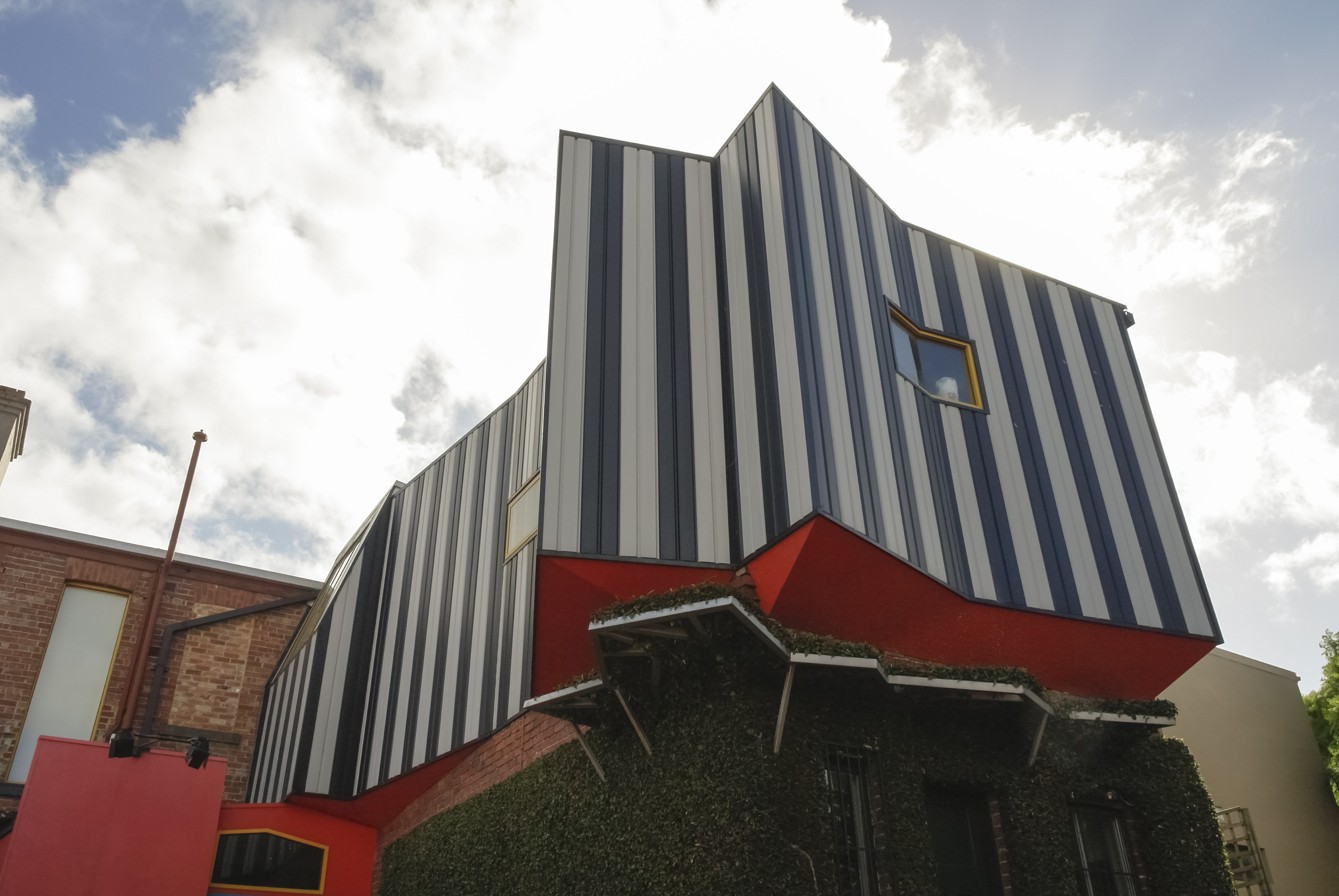
Niagara Galleries, Richmond, Melbourne

The practice's subsequent projects, many of them in suburban sites, continued with the idea of an Australian architectural language, visible in their competition entries for the Parliament House, Canberra Competition in 1977, The Australian Stockman's Hall of Fame and the State Library of Victoria, their many projects for community buildings, and their work for universities.

They later undertook larger projects; many of them, particularly RMIT Building 8, pursued the idea of 'a city in a single building'. Their Athan House of 1986 was published widely.

The practice also worked extensively in stage and set design for Opera Australia, Melbourne University Theatre Group, and La Mama.

Peter Corrigan wrote about his practice's work and about others, explicitly stating the practice's goal of creating or fostering a particularly Australian architectural language.

=== Recognition ===
In 2003 Peter Corrigan was awarded the RAIA Gold Medal, 2003, the highest accolade of the Australian architecture profession. In 1993 he was awarded an Honorary Doctorate in Architecture from RMIT University.

Twenty years later, in 2023, Maggie Edmond was awarded the Australian Institute of Architects Gold Medal at the National Awards, with her name added to the same award that was presented to Peter Corrigan in 2003. At the 2023 National Awards she described the correction as 'restorative'. The rectification awards their work as a unique and innovative partnership.

== Notable projects and awards ==
The following projects, all completed in or for Victorian locations, were designed by Edmond & Corrigan:

Edmond & Corrigan projects list
Year	Project	Client	Location	Type	Awards
1977	Freedom Club Childcare Centre		Keysborough	Education	
1977	Church of the Resurrection		Keysborough	Religion	
1978	Chapel of St Joseph (now Strabane Chapel Hall)		27–29 Strabane Avenue, Mont Albert North	Religion	RAIA Merit Award for Outstanding Architecture, New Buildings Category, 1983 (Vic); Enduring Architecture Award, 2003
1978	Resurrection School		Keysborough	Education	Victorian Architecture Medal, 1979
1982	Kew House		Kew	Residential	RAIA Housing Merit Award, 1982 (Vic)
1982	Kay Street Housing	Ministry of Housing	75—79 Kay Street, Carlton	Residential	Maggie Edmond Enduring Architecture Award, 2010
1984	Merli House		Merricks North, Mornington Peninsula	Residential	
1985	Fairfield Amphitheatre		Fairfield Park, Fairfield	Public space	Maggie Edmond Enduring Architecture Award, 2026
1986	Office of Edmond & Corrigan		46 Little Latrobe Street, Melbourne	Commercial	
1988	Dandenong College of TAFE, Stage 3		Dandenong	Education	RAIA Commendation for Public Architecture, 1989
1988	Athan House	Louis & Sophie Athan	Monbulk	Residential	RAIA Bronze Medal for Outstanding Architecture Award, New Residential Category, 1989 (Vic)
1988	Walsh House, Scheme for Pool Pavilion			Residential	Architecture Australia Prize for Unbuilt Work, 1994
1991	Keilor Fire Station	Victorian Government	Keilor	Public	
1994	Oakleigh Fire Station	Victorian Government	Oakleigh	Public	
1994	RMIT Building 8 Extension	RMIT University	Melbourne	Education	Victorian Architecture Medal, 1995; City of Melbourne Building and Planning Award, Institutional Buildings Category, 1995; RAIA Institutional Alterations and Extensions Award, 1995 (Vic); RAIA Walter Burley Griffin Award for Urban Design, 1995
1995	Greensborough Office and Carpark		Greensborough	Commercial	
1995	Ringwood Library Complex, Civic Plaza		Ringwood	Cultural	RAIA Urban Design Award, 1995 (Vic); RAIA Award of Merit, Institutional Category, 1996 (Vic)
1996	Windsor Fire Station	Victorian Government	Windsor	Public	Metal Building Award, Certificate of Merit, 1996; RAIA Award of Merit (Vic); BHP Colorbond Steel Award, 1997; RAIA Award of Merit, Commercial Category, 1997 (Vic)
1996	Exhibition Centre Showgrounds Stage 1		Melbourne Showgrounds, Ascot Vale	Public	RAIA Award of Merit, Commercial Category, 1997 (Vic)
1999	Lehrer Residence		Caulfield	Residential	RAIA Award of Merit, 2000 (Vic)
2001	Drama School, Victorian College of the Arts		30 Dodds Street, Southbank	Education	
2001	Niagara Galleries		245 Punt Road, Richmond	Arts	Dulux Colour Awards, Commercial Exterior Winner, 2002; BHP Colorbond Award, 2002 (Vic)
2001	Allan & Maria Myers Academic Centre		Newman College and St Mary's College, Parkville	Education	Heritage Architecture Award, 2005 (Vic)
2005	Lux House alteration, front porch			Residential	
2005	Readings Bookshop		309 Lygon Street, Carlton	Commercial	

== Gallery ==
Edmond and Corrigan selected projects
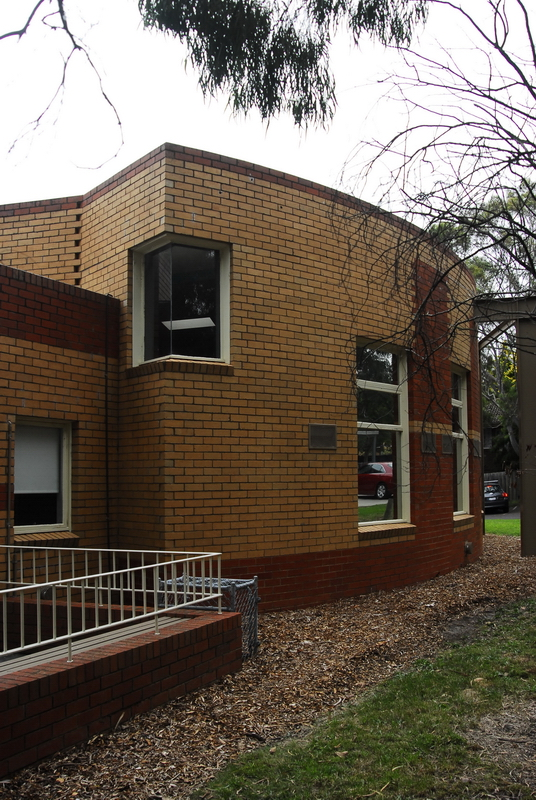
Chapel of St Joseph, 1978

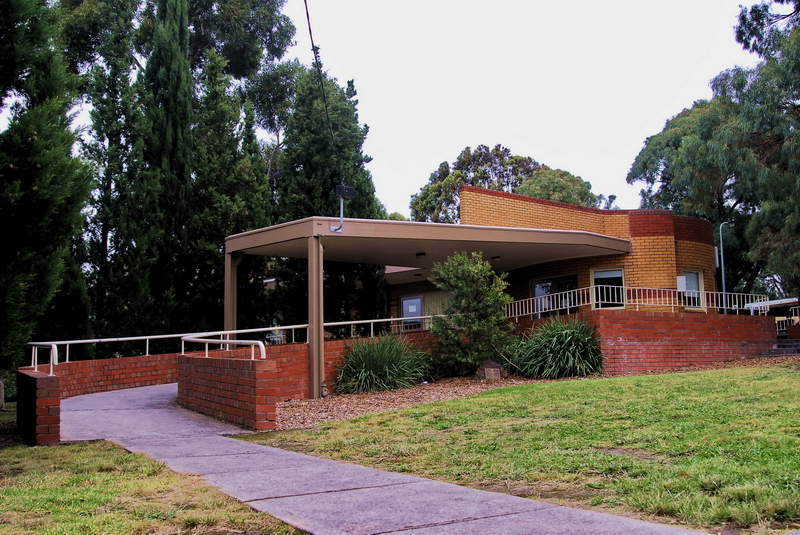
Chapel of St Joseph, 1978

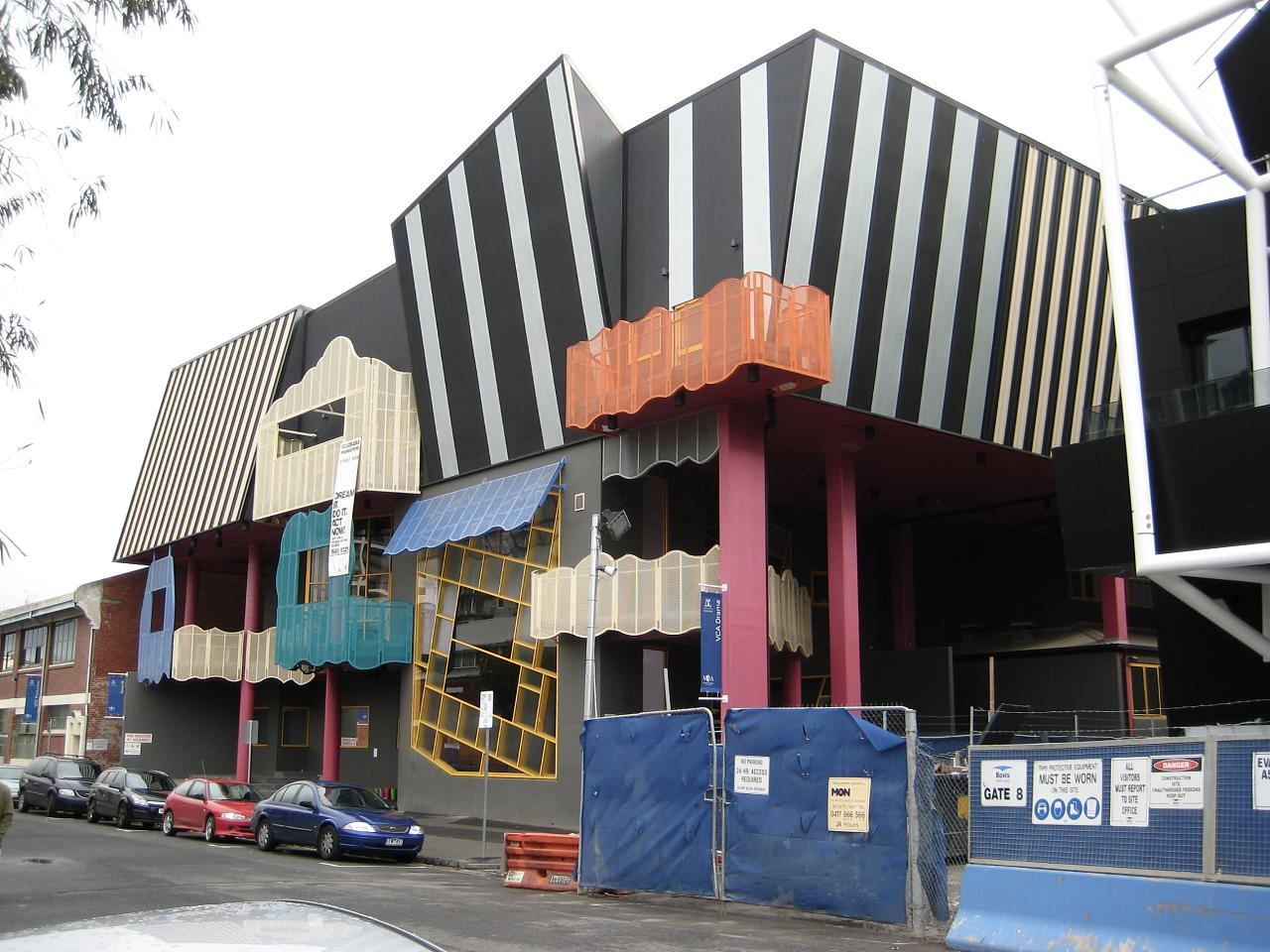
Victorian College of the Arts, Drama School

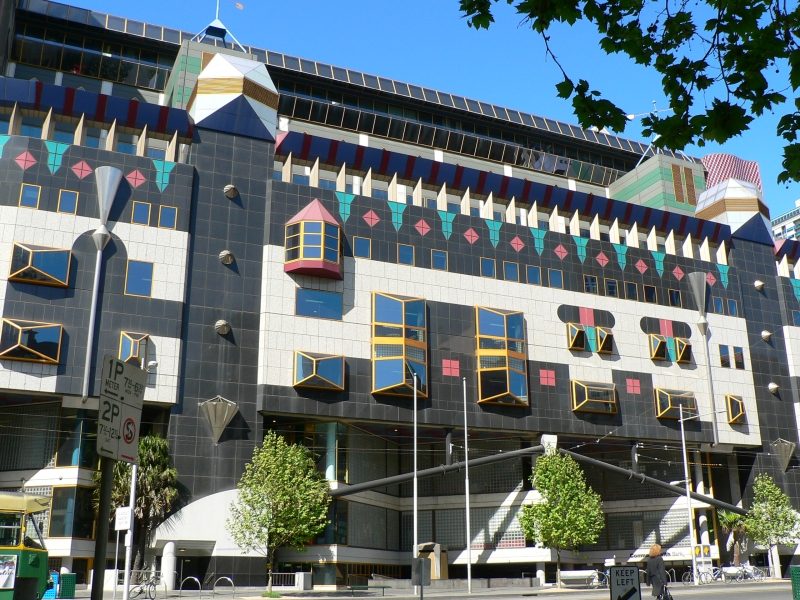
RMIT Building 8, Swanston Street, Melbourne

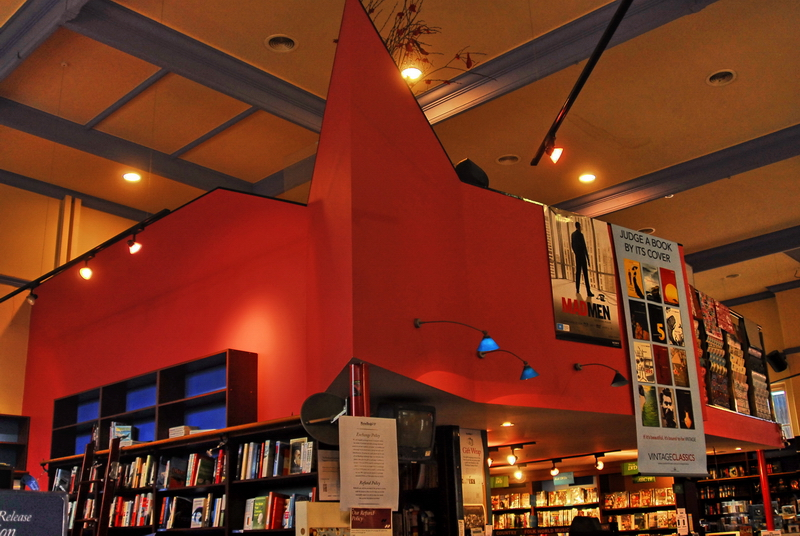
Readings Bookshop, Carlton, 2005

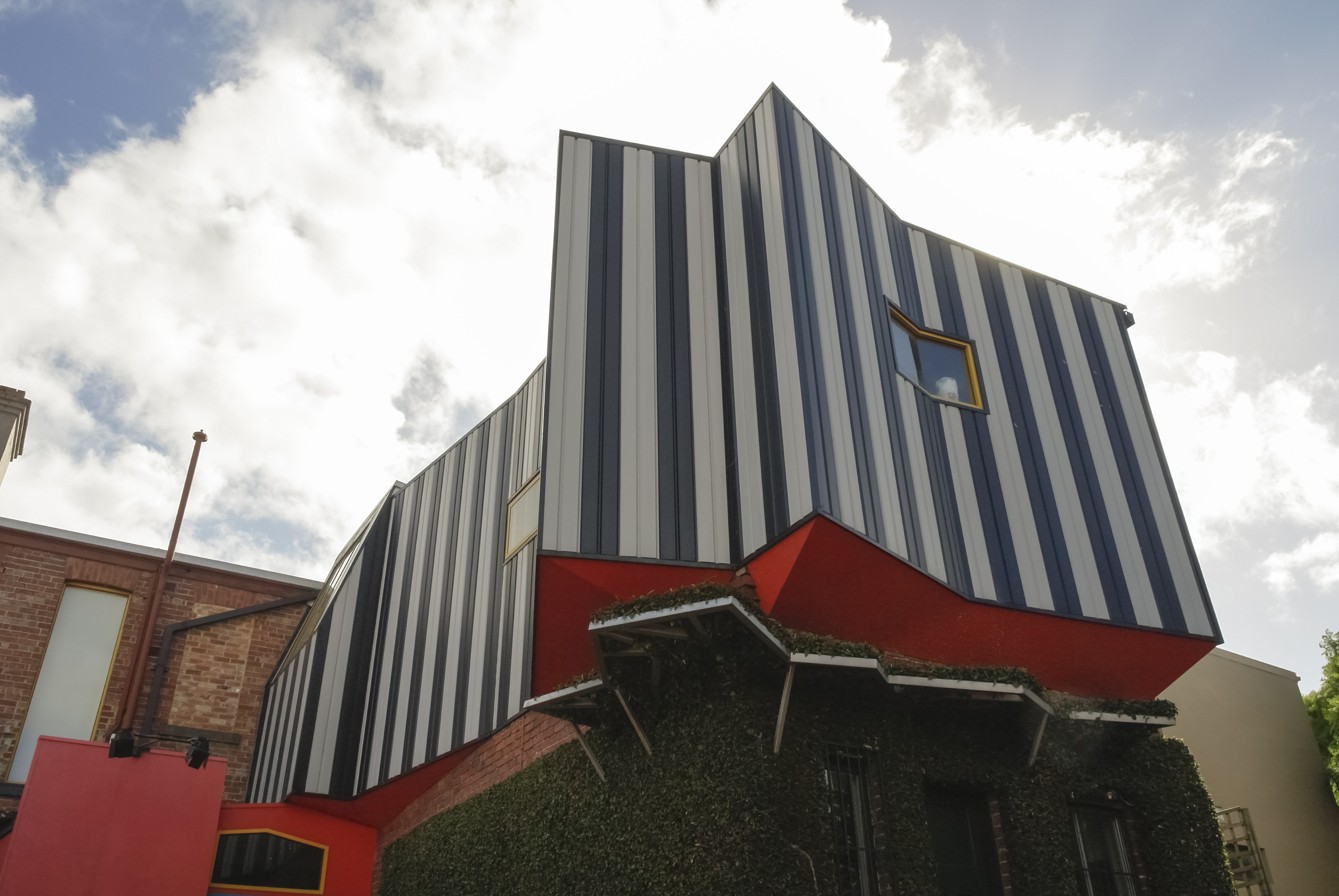
Niagara Galleries, Richmond

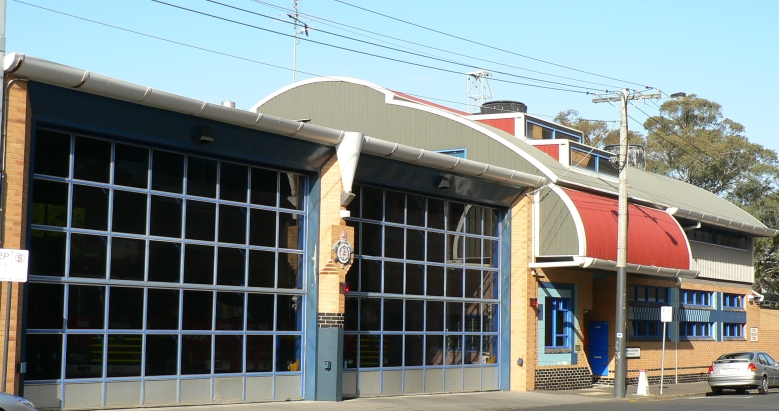
Windsor Fire Station

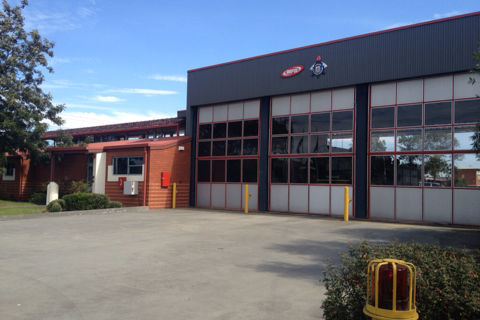
Keilor Fire Station, 1991

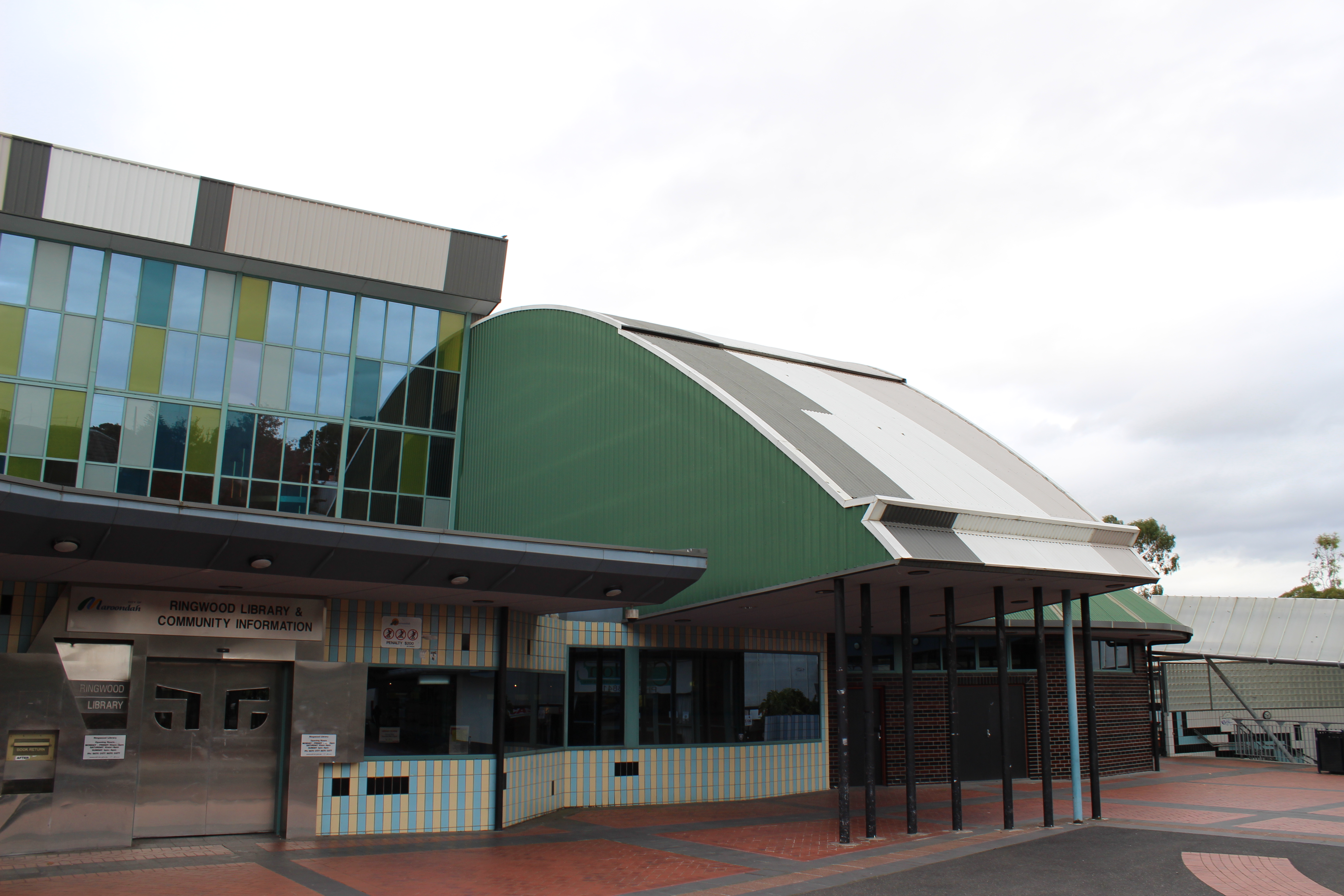
Ringwood Library, 1995

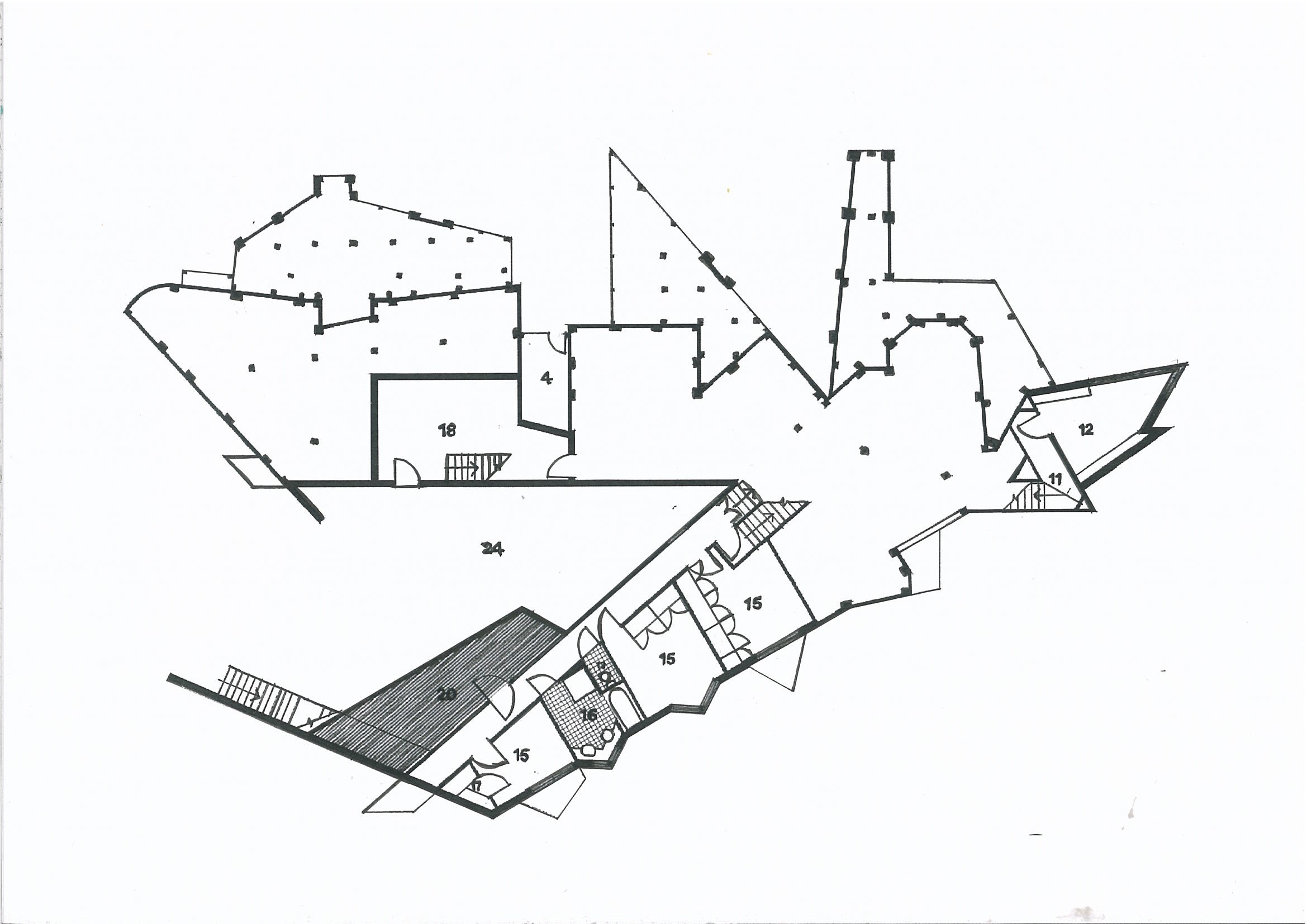
Plan of Athan House, 1984
