= Athan House =

Coordinates: 37°52′20″S 145°24′14″E

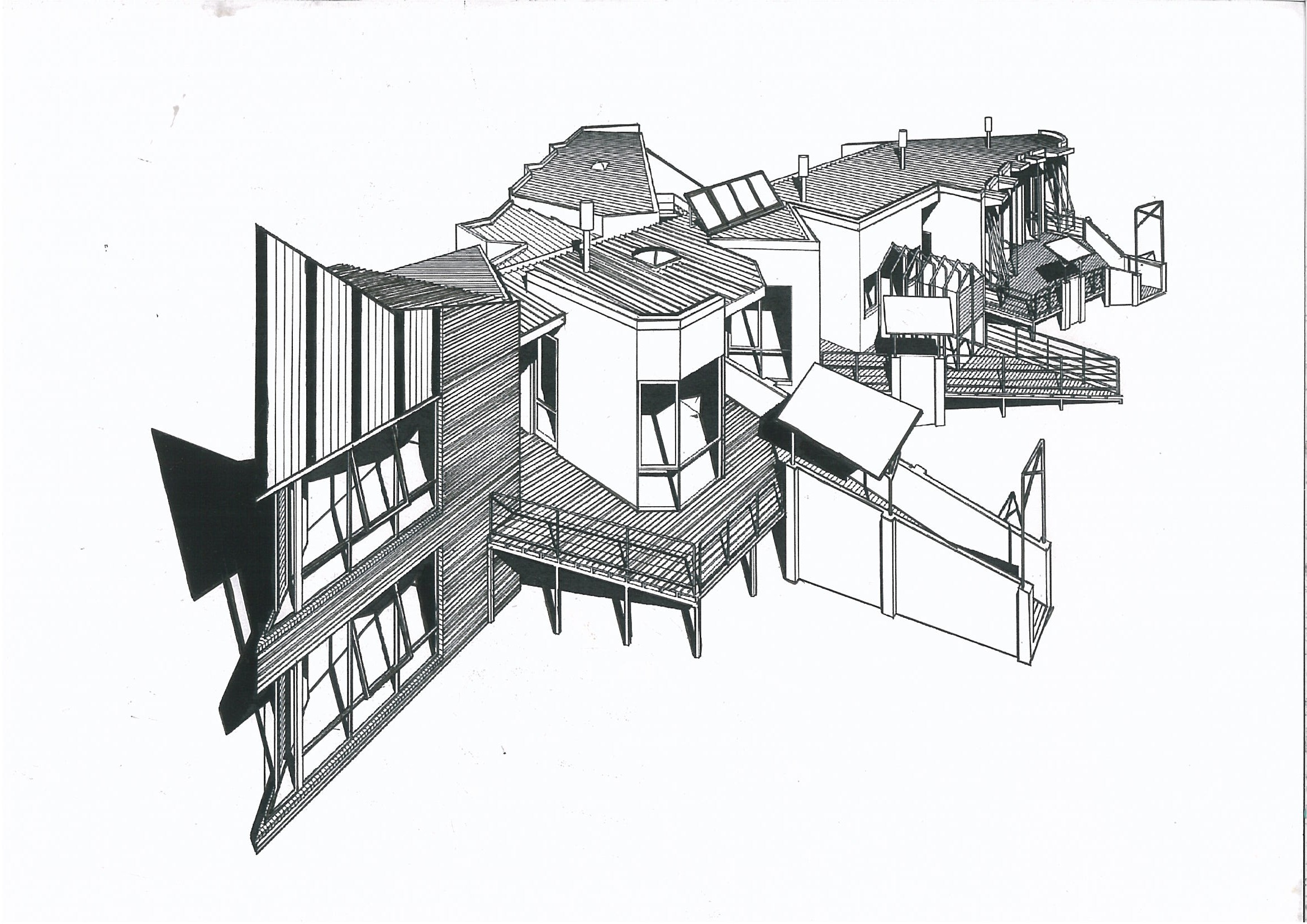
- Rear perspective drawing of Athan House
- Interactive map of the Athan House area

General information
- Location: Monbulk, Victoria, Australia
- Construction started: 1986
- Completed: 1988
- Client: Louis and Sophe Athan

Design and construction
- Architect: Peter Corrigan
- Architecture firm: Edmond and Corrigan
- Awards and prizes: RAIA Outstanding Architecture, New Residential Category 1989

The Athan House was designed by the Melbourne-based architectural firm of Edmond and Corrigan and is located in Monbulk, a town located in the Dandenong Ranges just outside metropolitan Melbourne, Australia. The project team consisted of Peter Corrigan, Adrian Page and Chris Wood. The house was designed and constructed between 1986 and 1988.

== Physical description ==
The owners, Louis and Sophie Athan, commissioned Peter Corrigan to design the house on the site that had previously been used by the family for camping holidays. It was to be large enough to accommodate an extended family of up to eight people. The house was built on the northern incline of a heavily vegetated gully, with access onto the site from the south.

Architecturally the house consists of two angled structures overlooking a triangular courtyard. Both “wings” consist of a ground and upper floor. Entry to the house is via a sloped driveway along a brick wall to a castle-like closed facade.

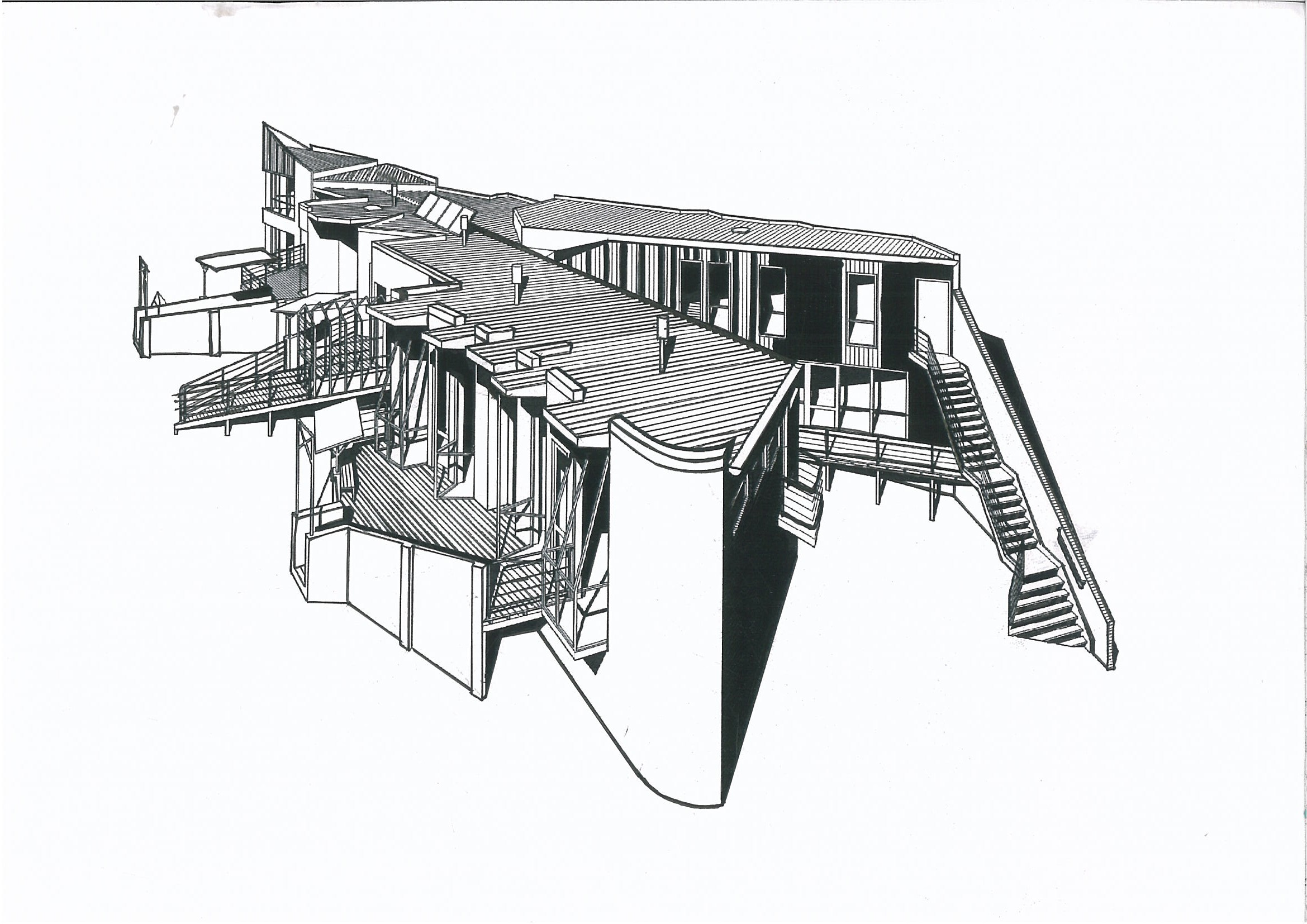
Rear and side perspective of Athan House

The northern aspect of the house overlooks bushland via a series of balconies on the upper level bedrooms.

The apex of the triangle created by the two arms of the building consists of a section housing the library and study, with large picture windows overlooking the valley.

There is extensive use of different materials such as face-brick, glass and wood, as well as bright painted finishes on the exterior of the building.

== Awards and acknowledgments ==
- RAIA awards: Outstanding Architecture, New Residential Category 1989.
- Athan House included in David Dunster’s “Key Buildings of the Twentieth Century vol 2: Houses 1945-89” published in 1990

== Bibliography ==
- Evans, D, 1997. "A Guide To Contemporary Melbourne Architecture." 3rd ed. Melbourne, Australia: Aardvark Magazine, RMIT
- Symbolic Exchange in the Field of Architectural Production - D.Evans, [Case Study 1, Athan House.]
- Hamann, C, 1993. "Cities of Hope: Australian Architecture and Design by Edmond and Corrigan 1962-1992." p. 136-139. 1st ed. Melbourne, Australia: Oxford University Press Australia
- Evans, D, 1990. "A Selected Guide To Contemporary Melbourne Architects." 1st ed. Melbourne, Australia: Aardvark Magazine, RMIT
