= Yencken =

Yencken is a surname. Notable people with the surname include:

- Arthur Ferdinand Yencken (1894–1944), Australian diplomat
- Edward Yencken (1854–1932), Australian hardware merchant
- David Yencken (1931–2019), Australian builder, businessman, academic, and heritage practitioner
