= Maggie Edmond Enduring Architecture Award =

Annual architecture award for significant buildings in Victoria, Australia

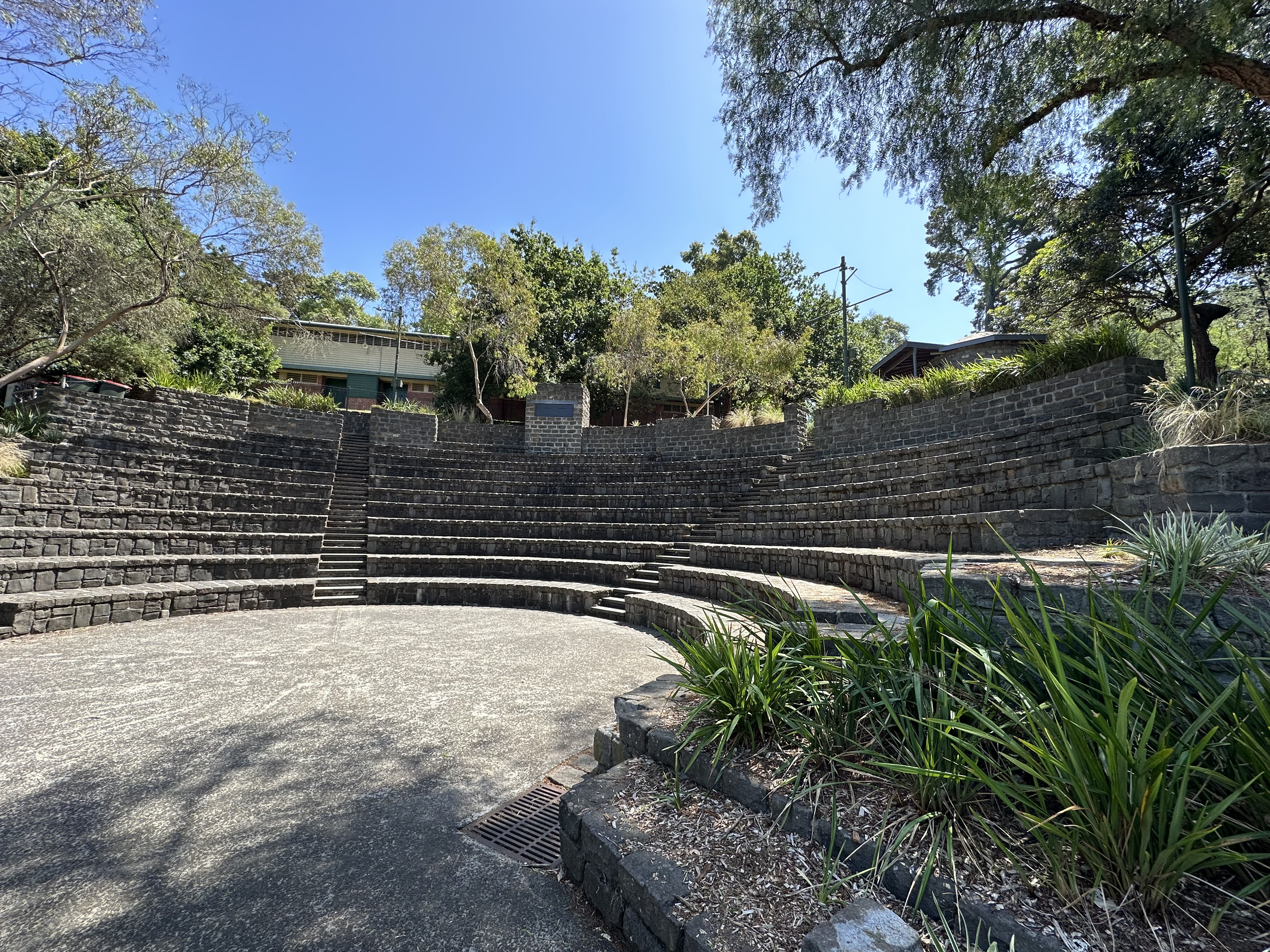
- Fairfield Amphitheatre, built 1985
- Awarded for: Outstanding architecture over time (25 years or more) in Victoria
- Country: Australia
- Presented by: Australian Institute of Architects (Victoria Chapter)
- First award: 2003; 23 years ago
- Currently held by: Maggie Edmond for Fairfield Amphitheatre, 2026

The Maggie Edmond Enduring Architecture Award is an architecture prize presented annually at the Victorian Architecture Awards by the Victorian Chapter of the Australian Institute of Architects (AIA) since 2003. The award recognises long lasting, significant and enduring architecture with usually 25 years passed since the completion of construction.

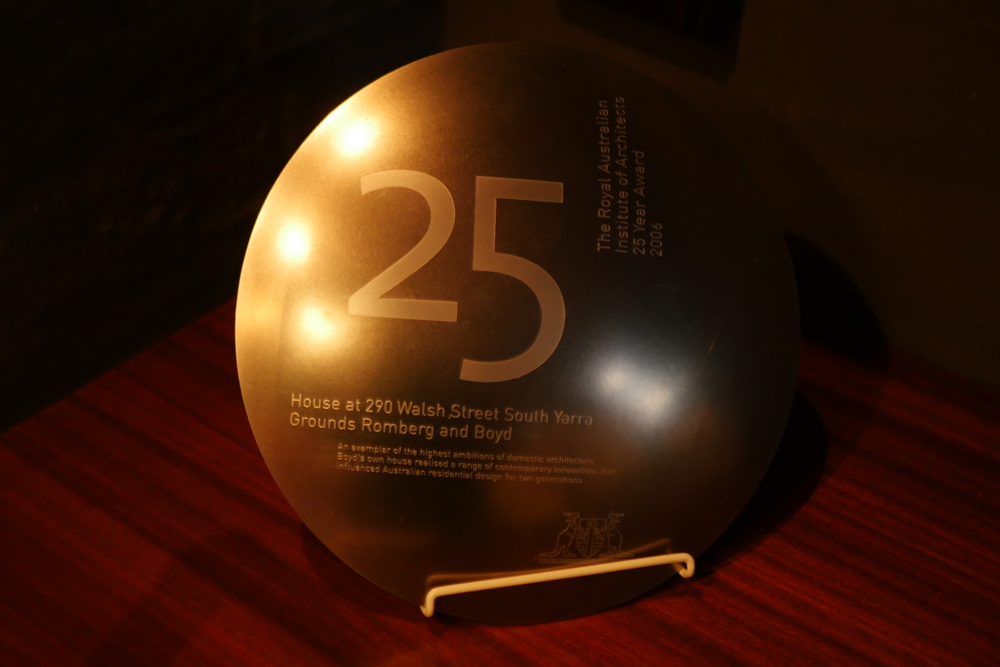
25 Year Award, 2006 for the Robin Boyd House II, Victoria Chapter of RAIA

== Background ==
The award was established in Victoria in 2003 and initially called the 25 Year Award. In 2007 the award name was changed to the '25 Year Award for Enduring Architecture' later becoming the 'Victorian Award for Enduring Architecture'. In 2023 the award became a named award, recognising Melbourne based architect Maggie Edmond, recipient of the first 25 Year Award in 2003, for the Chapel of St Joseph in Mont Albert North designed by her firm Edmond & Corrigan and built in 1978.

The award recognises achievement for the design of buildings of outstanding merit, which remain important as high quality works of architecture when considered in the contemporary context. Nominations for the award can be made by AIA members, non–members and non–architects, but adequate material and information supporting the nomination must be provided for consideration of the jury.

Recipients of the state-based award are eligible for consideration for the National Award for Enduring Architecture presented later in the same year, as part of the Australian National Architecture Awards.

The average age of the 24 projects that have won the award is 40.6 years (2003–2026).

== Recipients of the award ==
Maggie Edmond Enduring Architecture Award (since 2003)
Year	Architect	Project	Location	Year built	Years since*	Other AIA Awards
2026	Maggie Edmond for Edmond and Corrigan	Fairfield Amphitheatre	Fairfield Park, Fairfield	1985	41 years	
2025	Frederick Romberg	Stanhill Apartments	34 Queens Road, Melbourne	1950	75 years	
2024	Peter Elliott Architecture and Urban Design	Knox Schlapp Public Housing	45 Graham Street, Port Melbourne	1985	38 years	Robin Boyd Award shortlist, 1985; ACI Award for Innovation in Architecture, 1985; New Housing Merit Award, 1985
2023	Gregory Burgess	Brambuk: Living Cultural Centre	277 Grampians Road, Halls Gap, Grampians National Park	1990	33 years	National Award for Enduring Architecture, 2023; Sir Zelman Cowen Award for Public Architecture (National), 1990; Institutional: New, Merit Award, 1990 (Victoria)
2022	Allan Powell	Crigan House	21 Victoria Street, St Kilda	1989	33 years	
2021	Kevin Borland, John and Phyllis Murphy and Peter McIntyre (with engineer Bill Irwin)	Swimming and Diving Stadium	Olympic Boulevard and Batman Avenue, Olympic Park	1956	63 years	National Award for Enduring Architecture, 2021; Building of the Year, 1956
2020	Daryl Jackson in association with Tompkins Shaw and Evan	Great Southern Stand	Melbourne Cricket Ground	1992	28 years	Victorian Architecture Medal, 1992; Sir Zelman Cowen Award for Public Architecture (National), 1992
2019	Nonda Katsalidis	Melbourne Terrace Apartments	Franklin and Queen Street, Melbourne	1994	25 years	Architecture Award, 1994; City of Melbourne Building and Planning Award, 1995
2018	Cocks Carmichael Whitford	Yarra Footbridge, Southbank (Evan Walker Bridge)	Yarra River	1990	28 years	Walter Burley Griffin Award for Urban Design, 1990
2017	Loader and Bayley in association with Harris, Lange and Partners	South Lawn car park	152–292 Grattan Street, University of Melbourne, Parkville Campus, Melbourne	1972	45 years	
2016	McGlashan Everist	Reed House (Heide II)	Heide Museum of Modern Art, 7 Templestowe Road, Bulleen	1968	48 years	Bronze Medal, 1968
2015	Grounds, Romberg & Boyd (partner in charge Robin Boyd)	Domain Park Apartments	193 Domain Road, South Yarra	1962	53 years	
2014	Peter McIntyre	McIntyre River House	2 Hodgson Street, Kew	1954	60 years	RAIA Architecture & Arts Award, 1954–1955
2013	Bates Smart & McCutcheon	ICI House (now Orica House)	1 Nicholson Street, Melbourne	1958	55 years	
2012	Roy Grounds	National Gallery of Victoria	180 St Kilda Road, Melbourne	1967	45 years	Public Building: Citation, 1969
2011	Robert Peck, YFHK & Denton Corker Marshall	One Collins Street	1 Collins Street, Melbourne	1985	26 years	Commercial Building: New Buildings, Merit Award, 1985
2010	Gregory Burgess, Cocks Carmichael, Peter Crone, Norman Day, Edmond and Corrigan, Peter Elliott, Gunn Williams Fender, MMH Partnership with Leo De Jong (MOH), Richard Marendaz (MOH), Robert Pierce (MOH), Geoff Sargeant (MOH)	Infill Housing Program by Ministry of Housing (1982—1985)	Kay Street, Carlton and Fitzroy North, Melbourne	1983	27 years	RAIA New Housing: Merit Award (for Kay Street, Carlton), 1984 (Victoria Chapter)
2009	Yuncken Freeman Brothers, Griffiths & Simpson (1956—1959); Gregory Burgess (1999—2001)	Sidney Myer Music Bowl	Kings Domain, Melbourne	1959	50 years	National Award for Enduring Architecture, 2009; Melbourne Prize, 2002
2008	Kevin Borland, Architect's Group	Clyde Cameron College (now Murray Valley Private Hospital)	Nordsvan Drive, Wodonga	1978	32 years	
2007	Graeme Gunn	Plumbers and Gasfitters Employees Union Building	52 Victoria Street, Carlton	1970	37 years	Victorian Architecture Award, Citation, 1971
2006	Grounds, Romberg & Boyd	Robin Boyd House II (Walsh Street House)	290 Walsh Street, South Yarra	1958	48 years	National Award for Enduring Architecture, 2006
2005	Yuncken Freeman	BHP House	140 William Street, Melbourne	1972	32 years	National Award for Enduring Architecture, 2005; Award of Merit, 1973; Bronze Medal, 1975
2004	Yuncken Freeman (Roy Simpson architect)	Catholic Archdiocese of Melbourne (Cardinal Knox Centre)	Albert Street, East Melbourne	1971	34 years	
2003	Edmond & Corrigan	Chapel of St Joseph (now Strabane Chapel Hall)	27–29 Strabane Avenue, Mont Albert North	1978	25 years	Merit Award for Outstanding Architecture, New Buildings Category, 1983 (Victorian Chapter)

* Number of years from completion until award.

== Gallery of award recipients ==
Maggie Edmond Enduring Architecture Award recipients
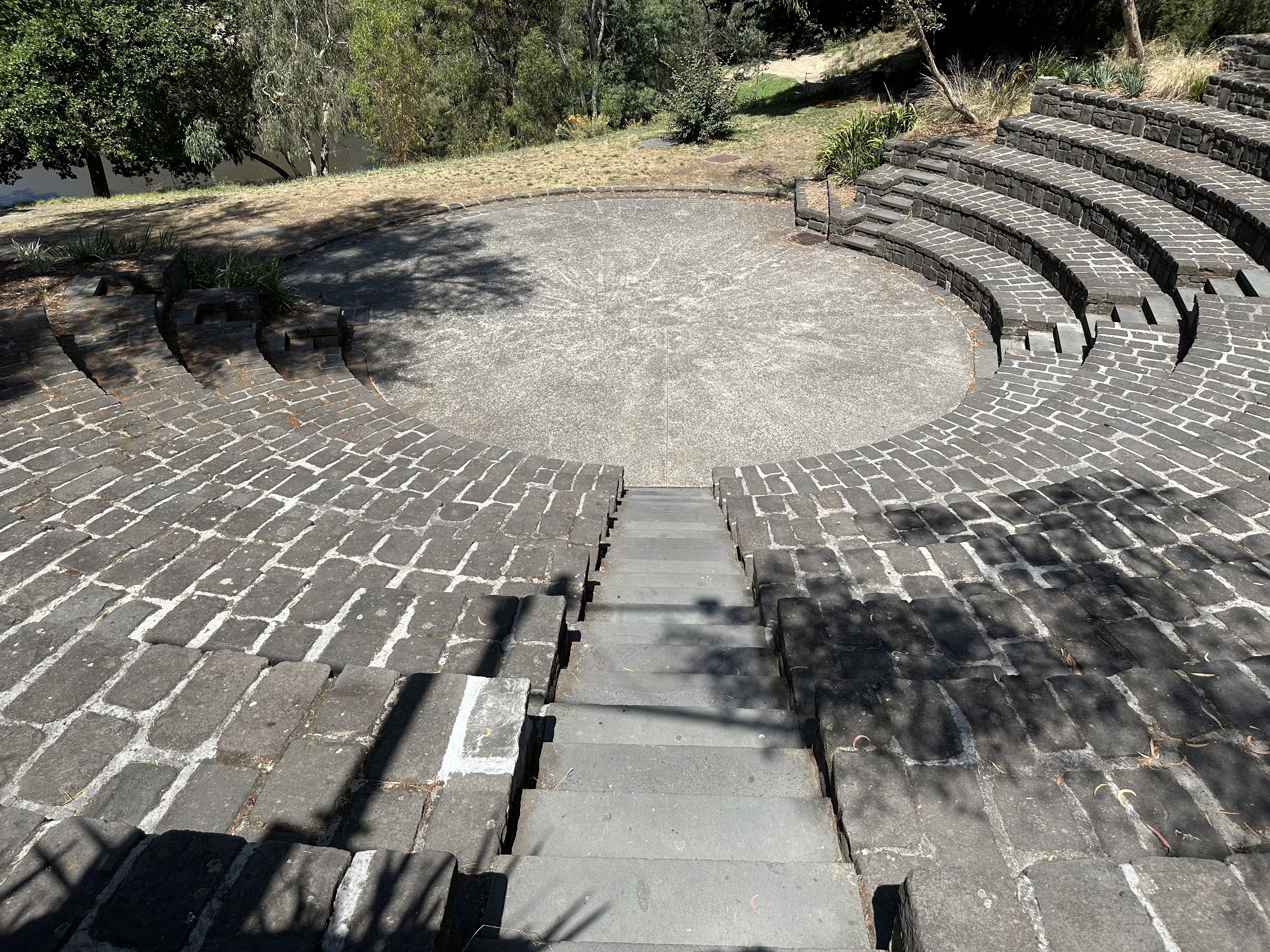
2026 award, Fairfield Amphitheatre, built 1985

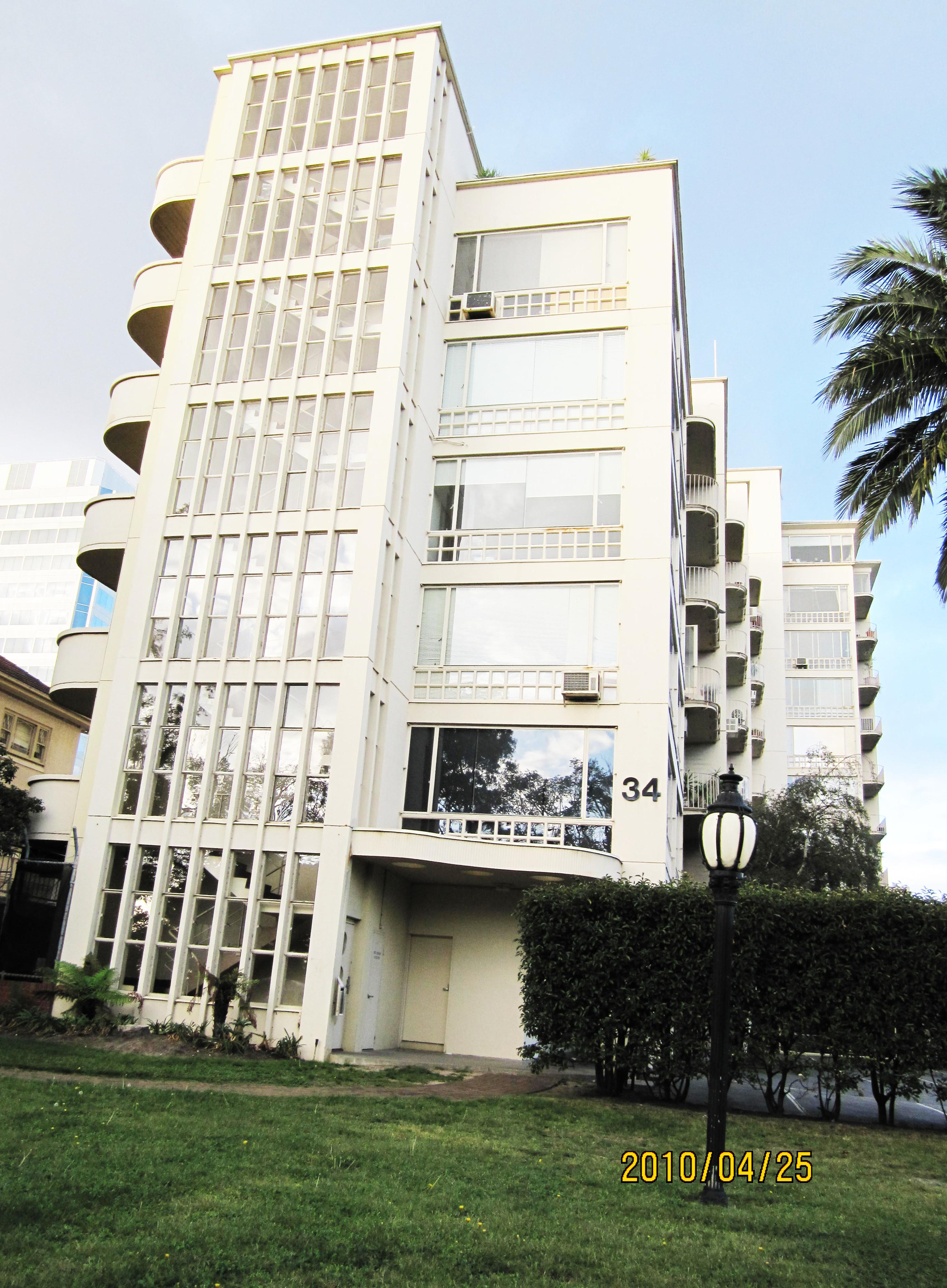
2025 award, Stanhill Apartments, built 1950

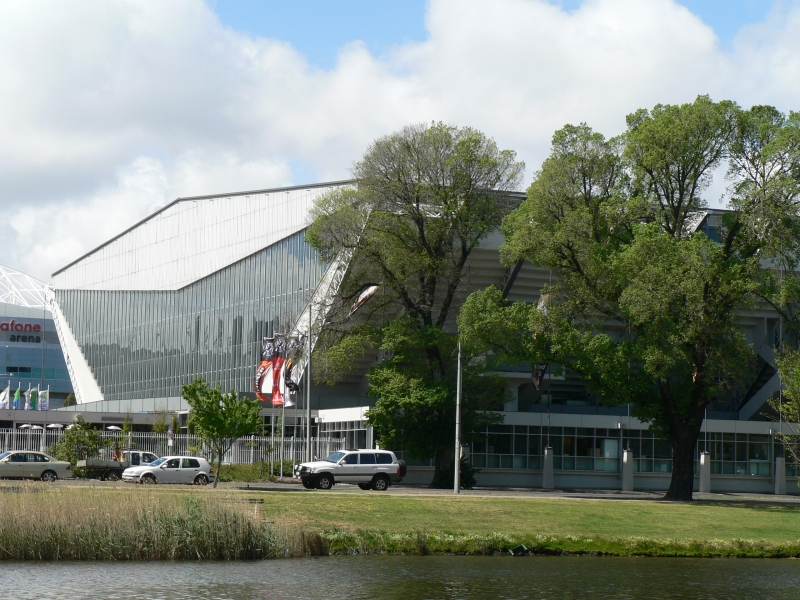
2021 award, Swimming and Diving Stadium, built 1956

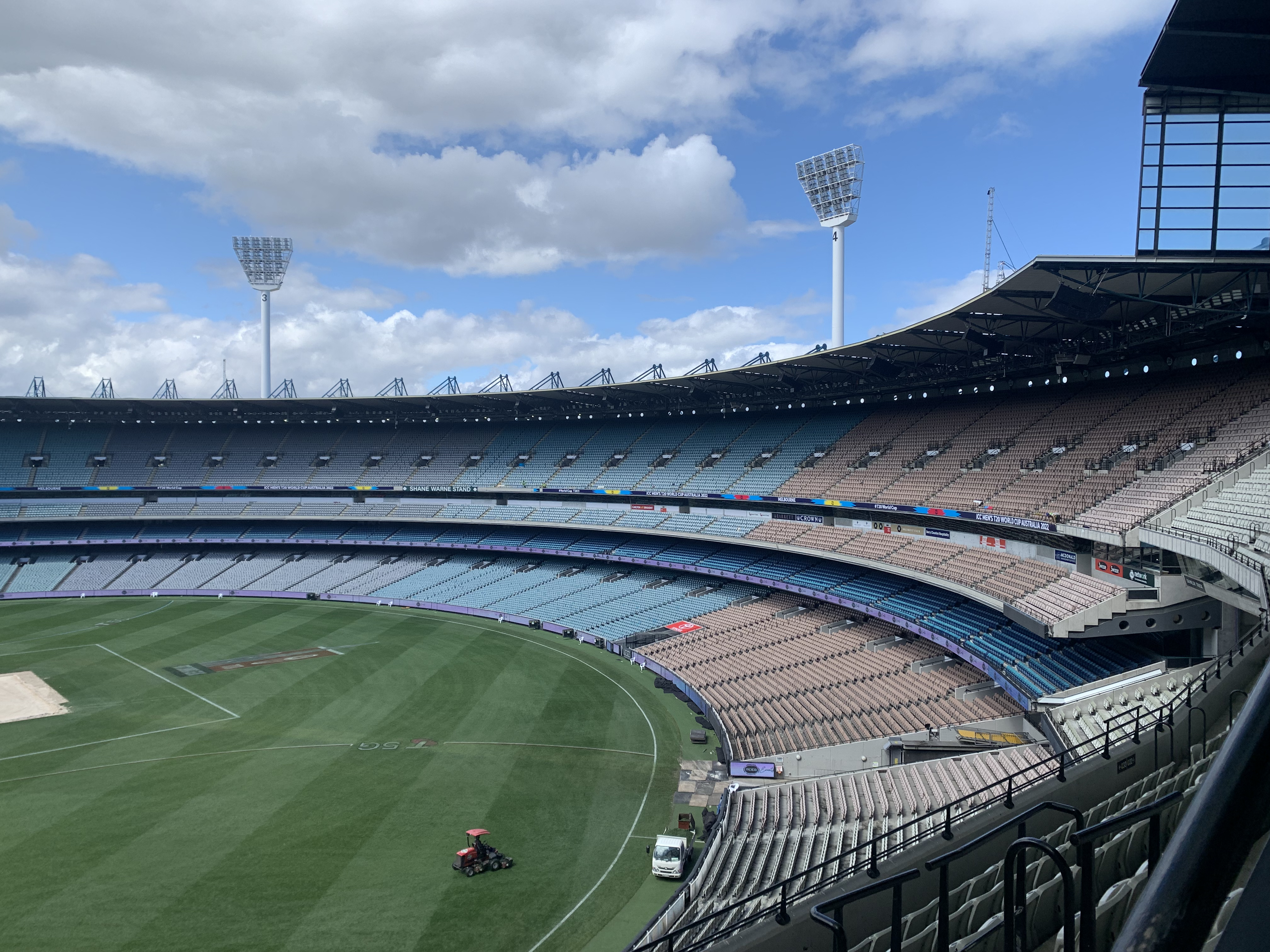
2020 award, Great Southern Stand, MCG, built 1992

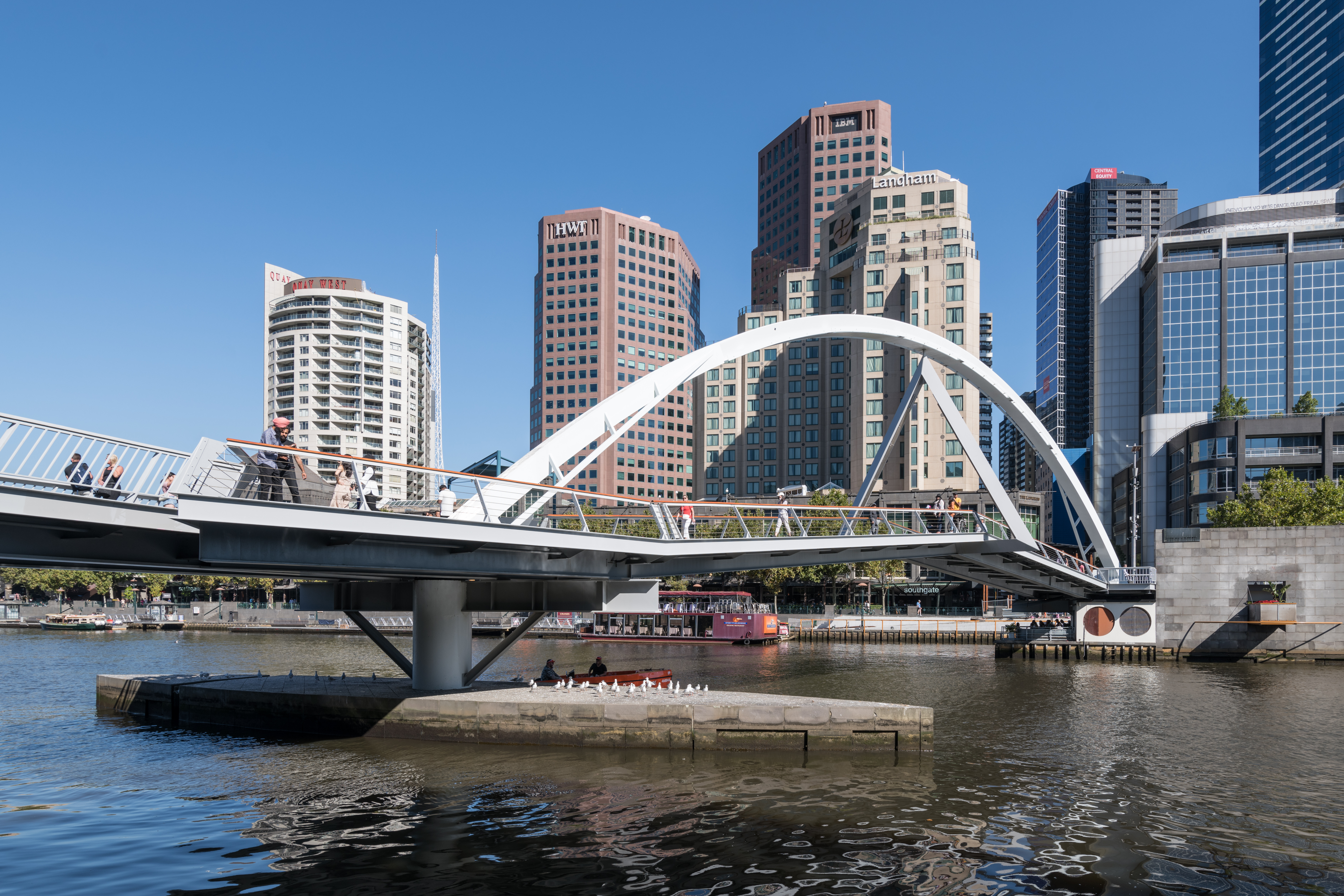
2018 award, Evan Walker Bridge, Yarra River, built 1990

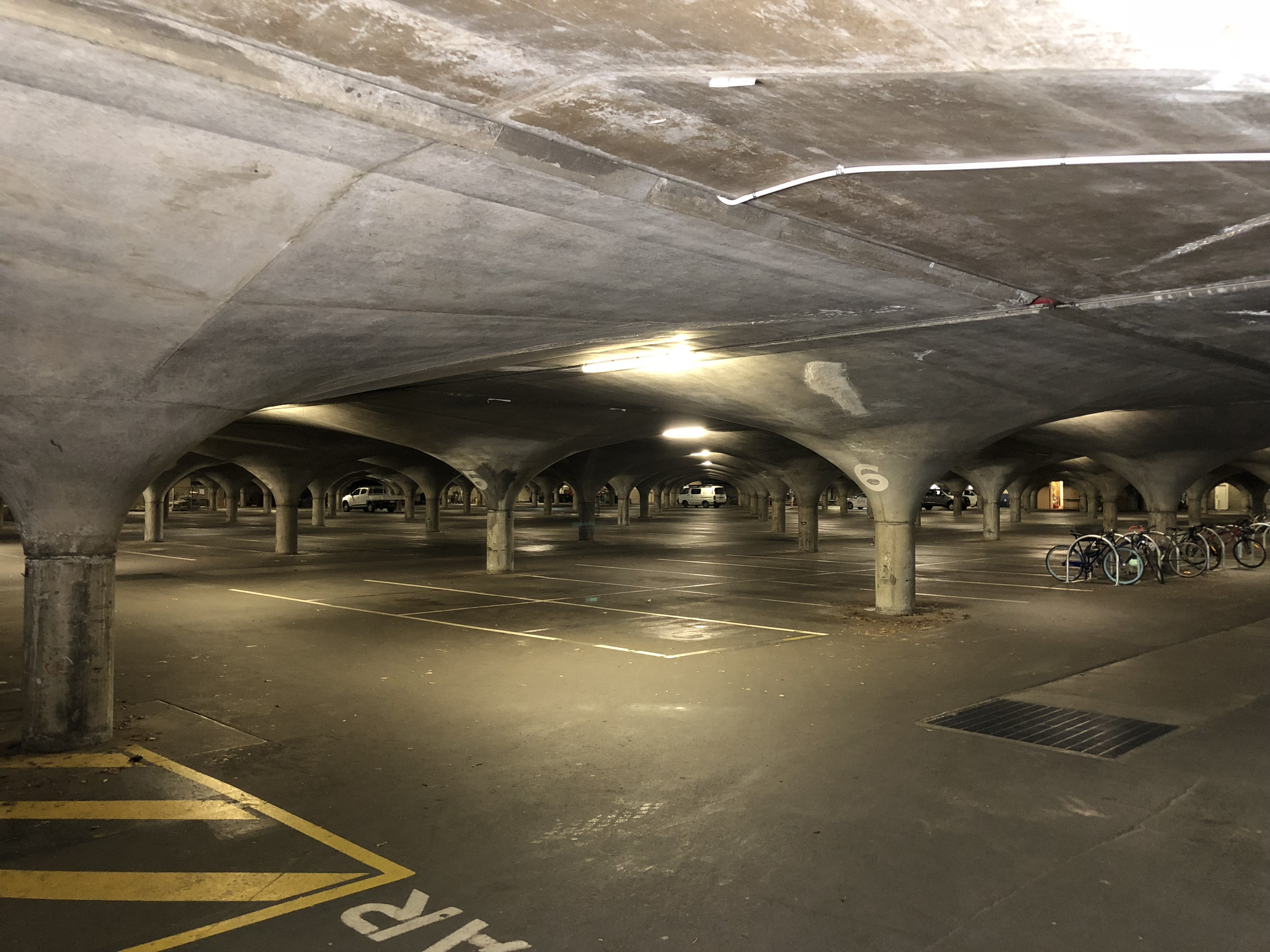
2017 award, South Lawn Car Park, University of Melbourne, built 1972

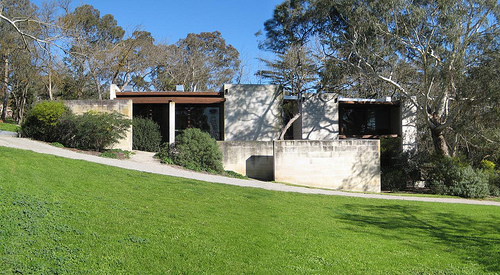
2016 award, Heide II, built 1968

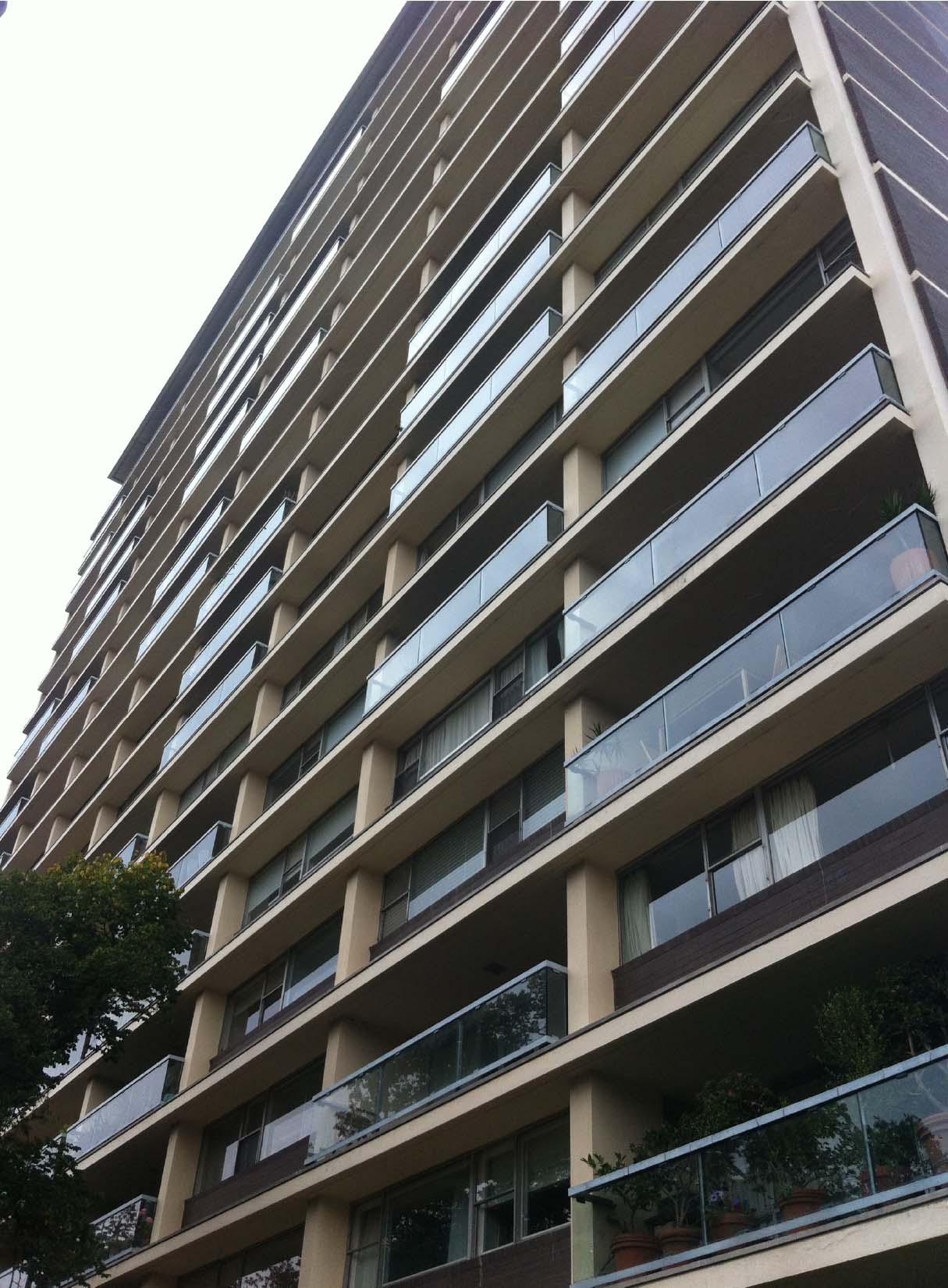
2015 award, Domain Park Flats, built 1962

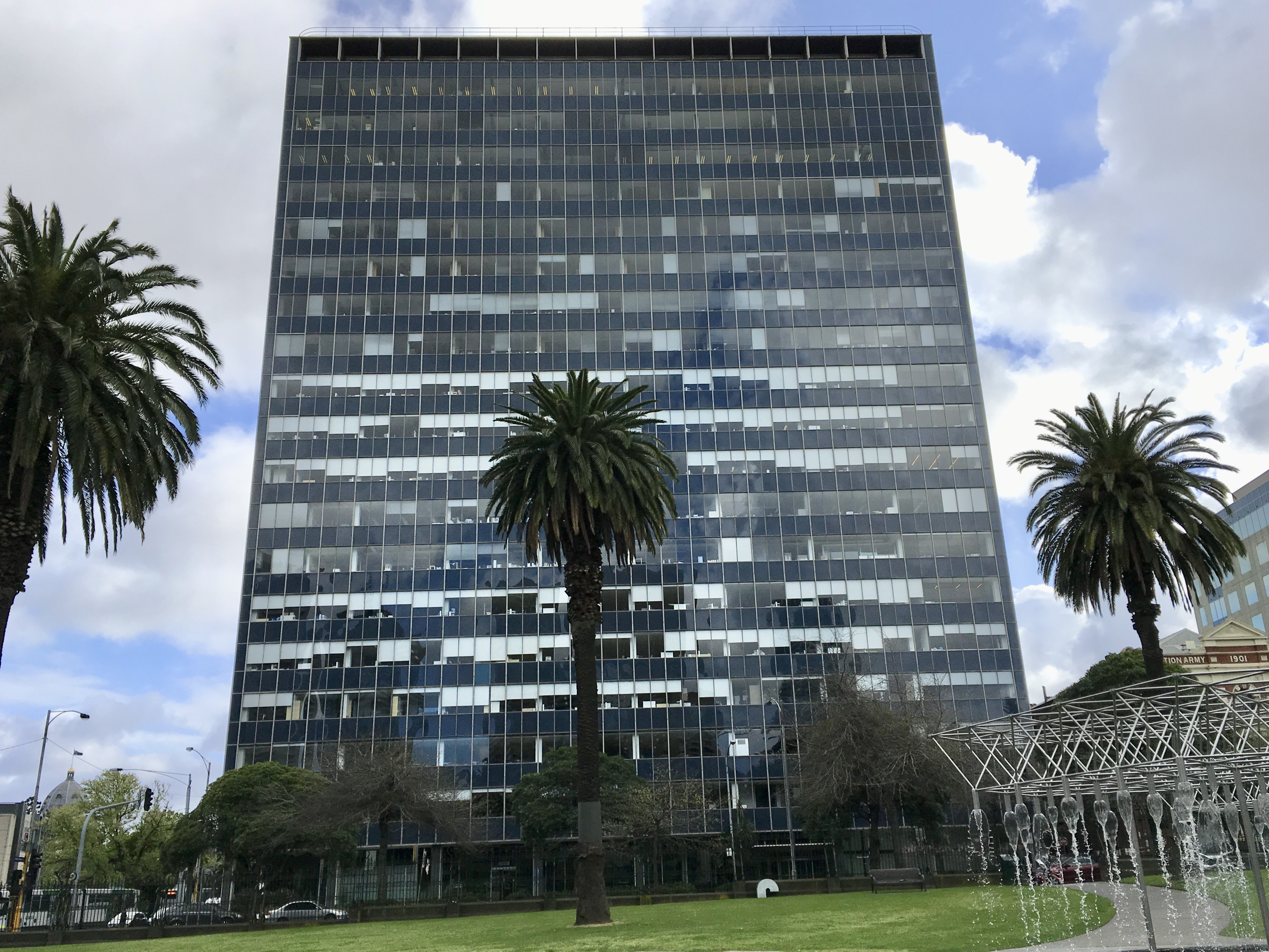
2013 award, ICI House, built 1958

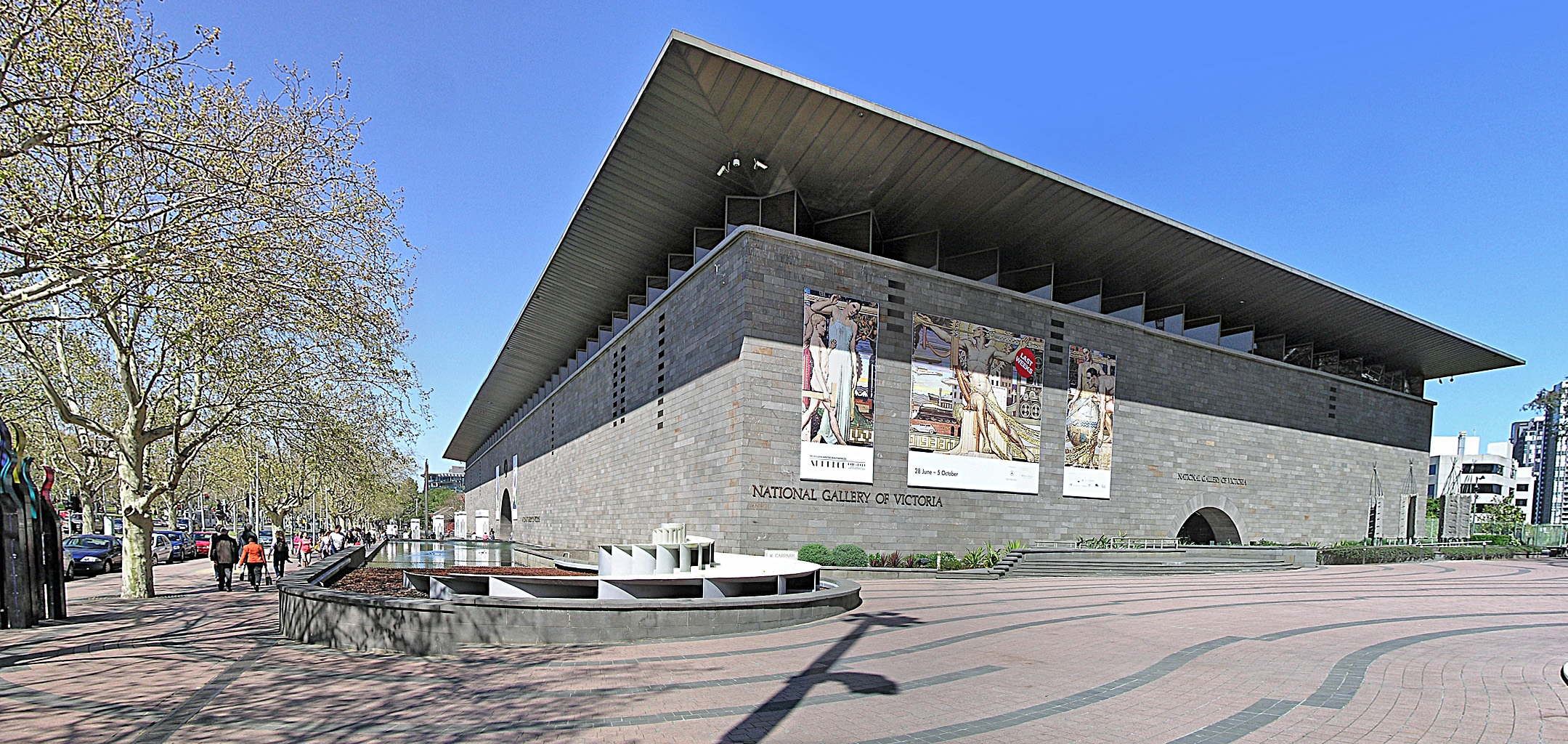
2012 award, National Gallery of Victoria (NGV), built 1967

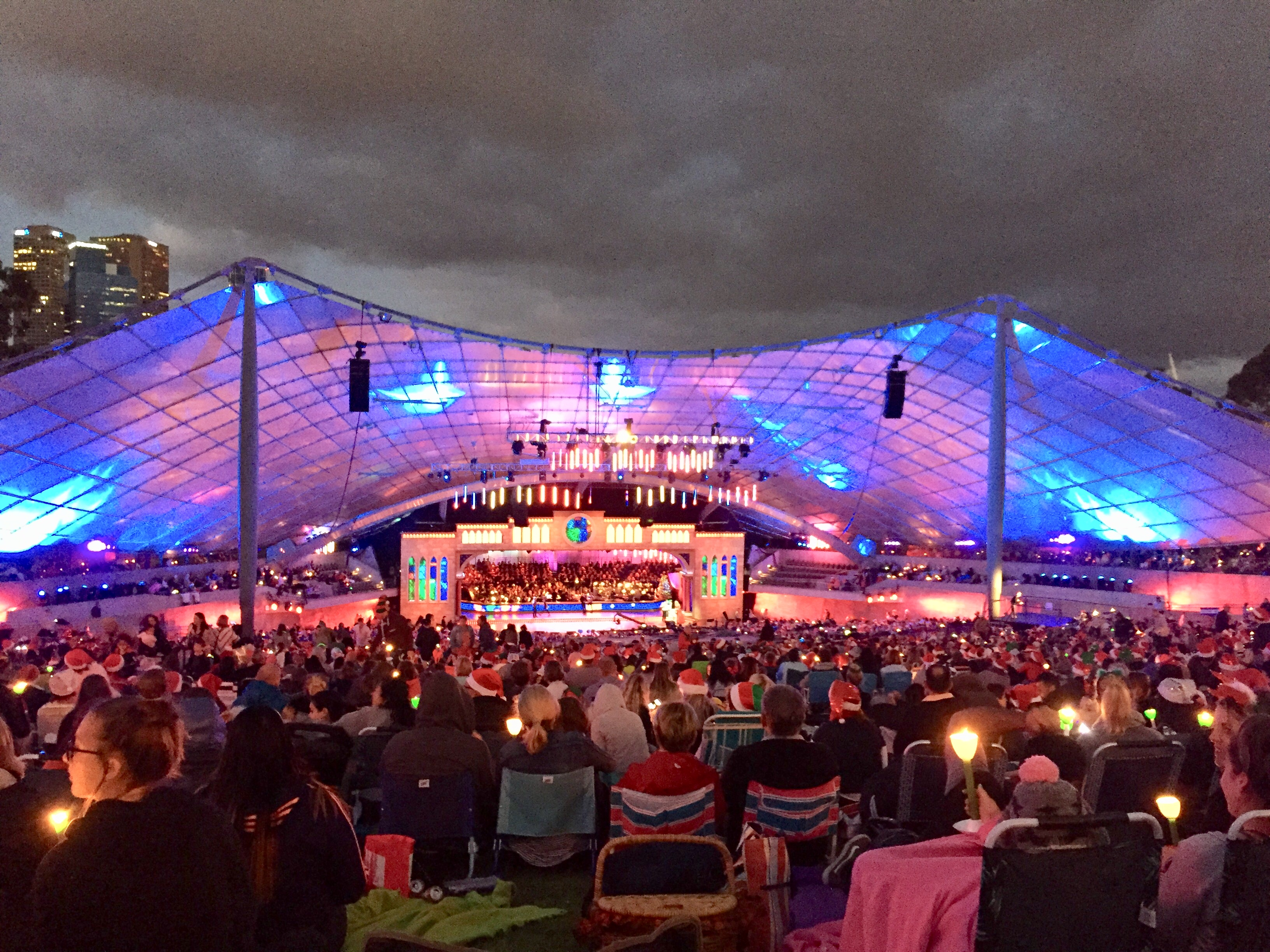
2009 award (National and Victorian), Sidney Myer Music Bowl, built 1959

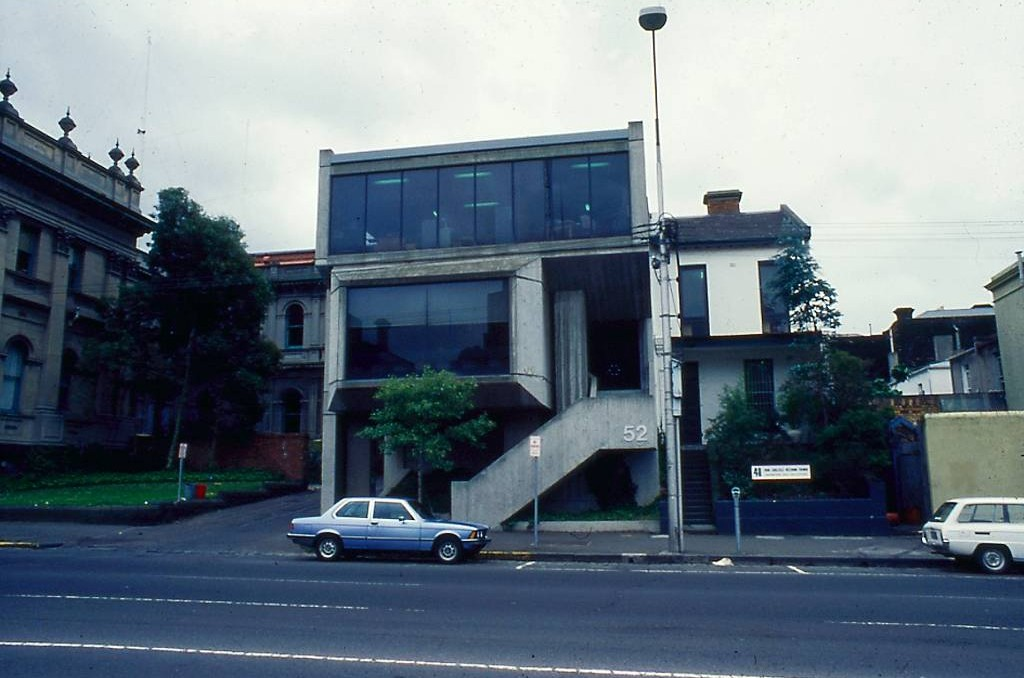
2007 award, Plumbers and Gasfitters Employees Union Building, built 1970

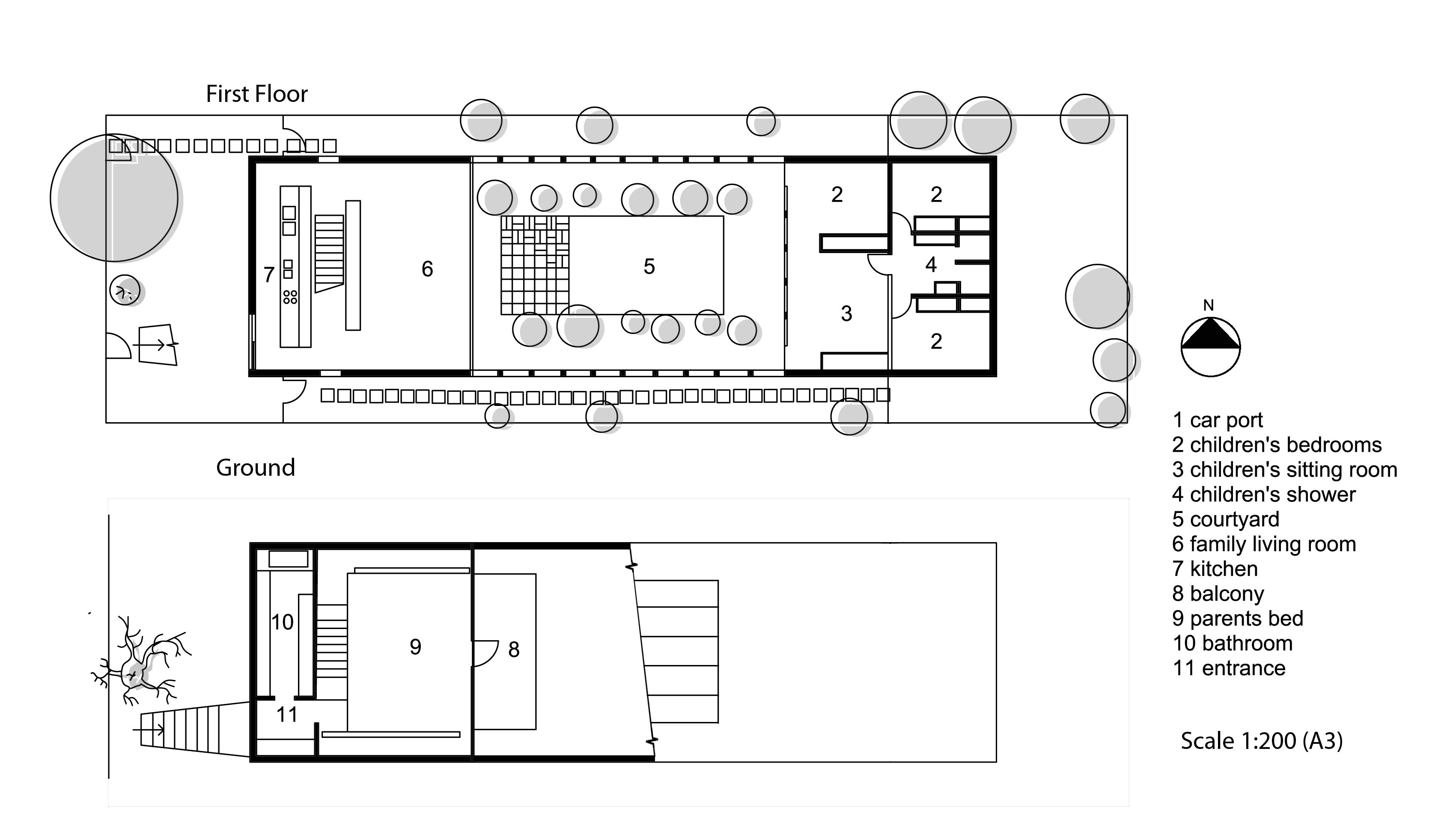
2006 award, Walsh Street House, built 1967

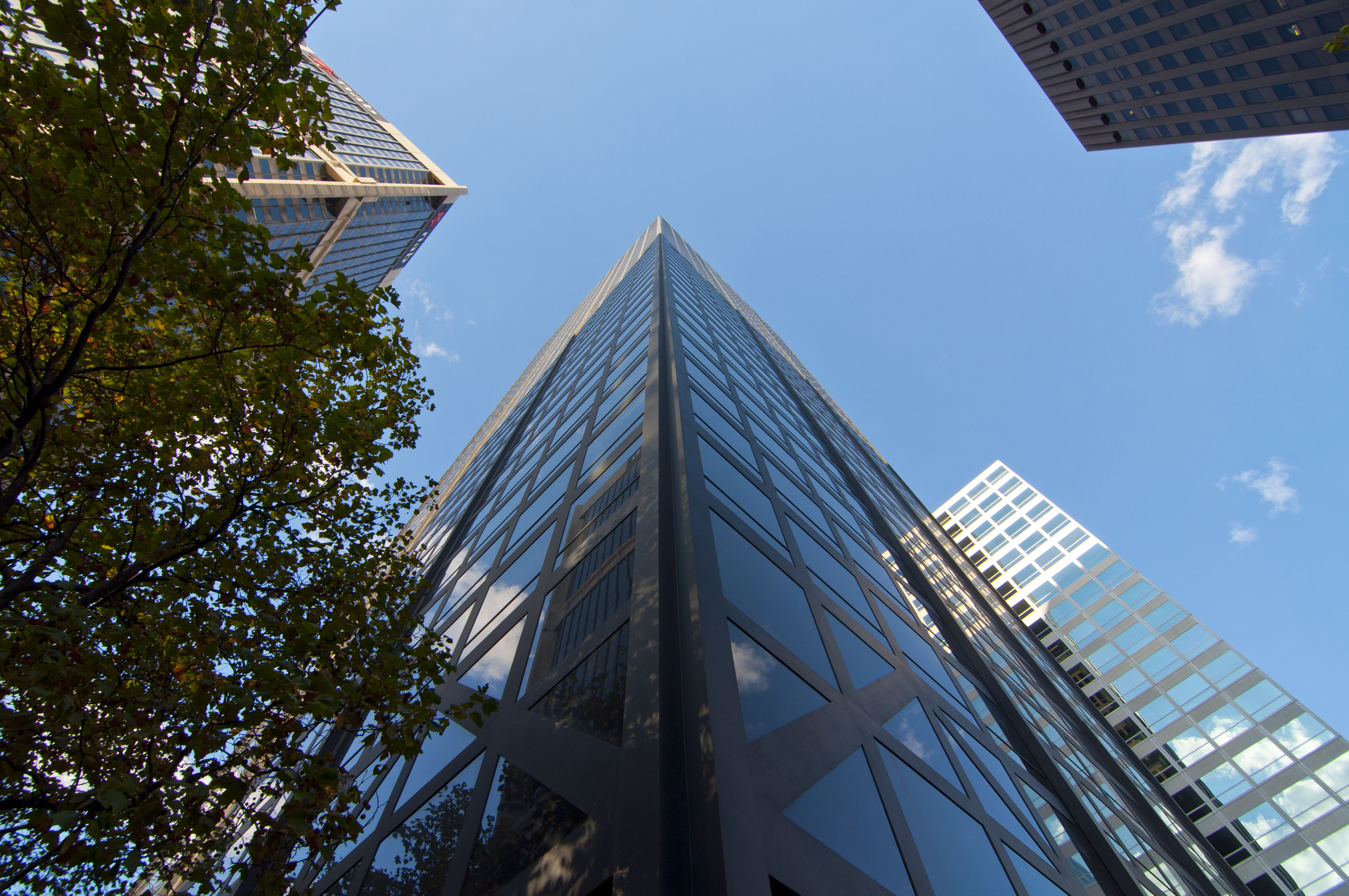
2005 award, BHP House, built 1967

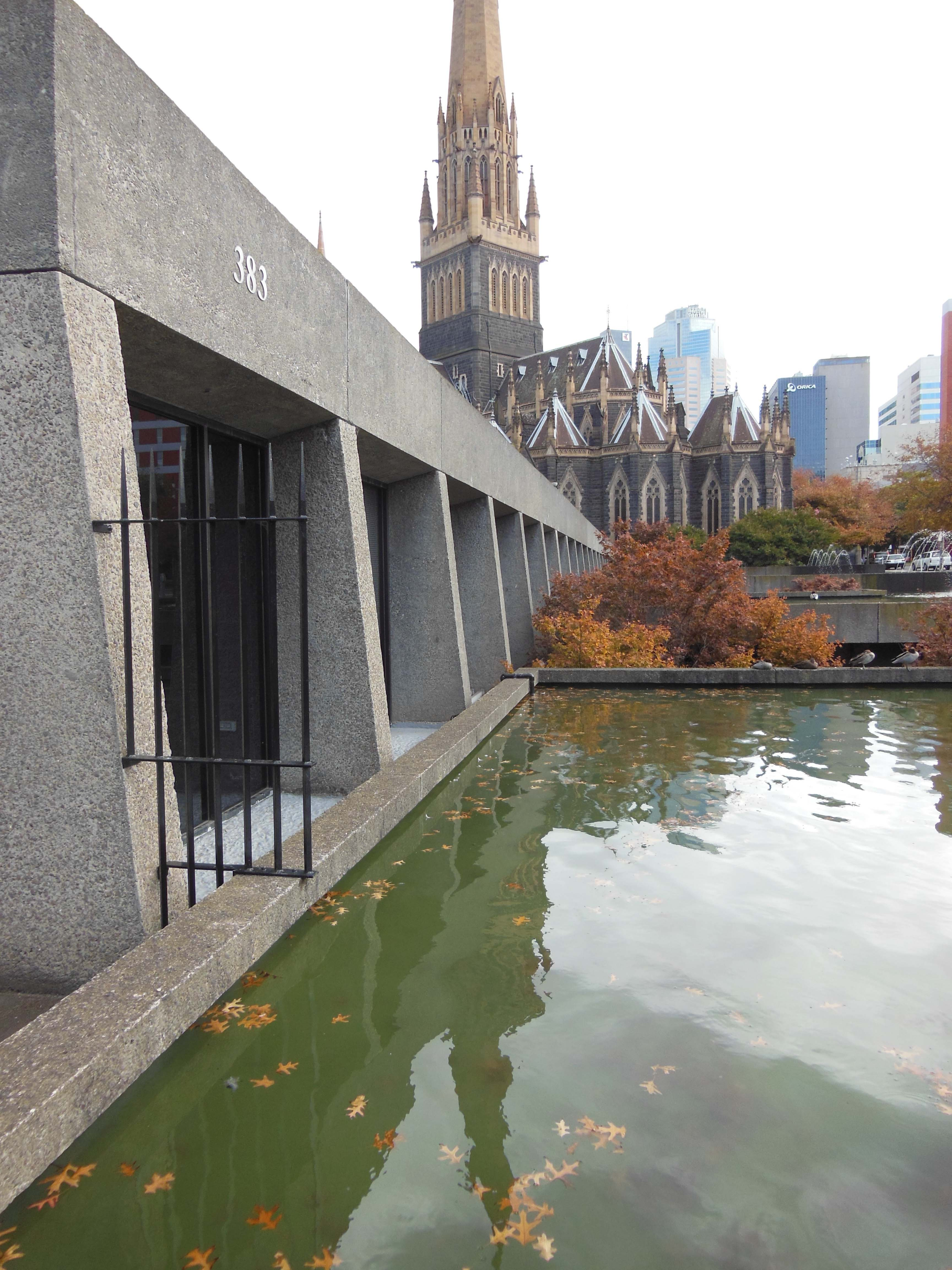
2004 award, Catholic Archdiocese of Melbourne (Cardinal Knox Centre), built 1971

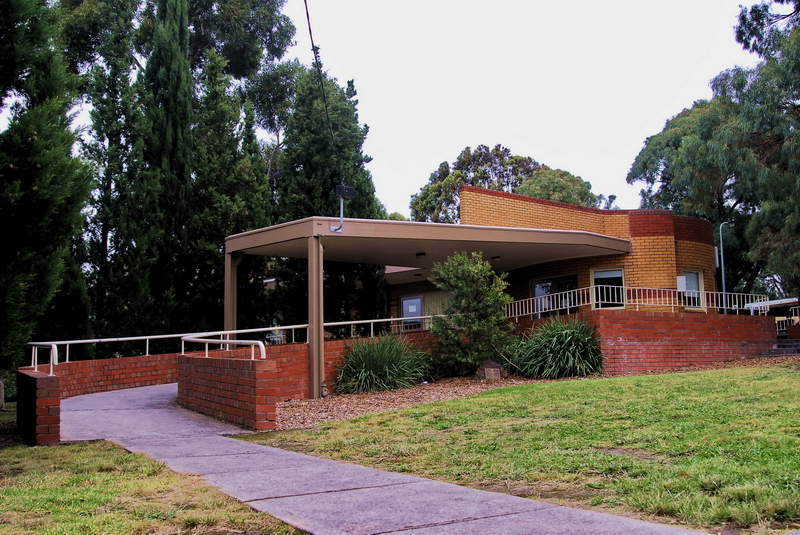
2003 award, Chapel of St Joseph, built 1978

== See also ==
- Australian Institute of Architects Awards and Prizes
- Maggie Edmond
- Australian Institute of Architects
- National Award for Enduring Architecture
- New South Wales Enduring Architecture Award
- Victorian Architecture Medal
- Melbourne Prize
