= Arthur Ferdinand Yencken =

Australian businessman (1894–1944)

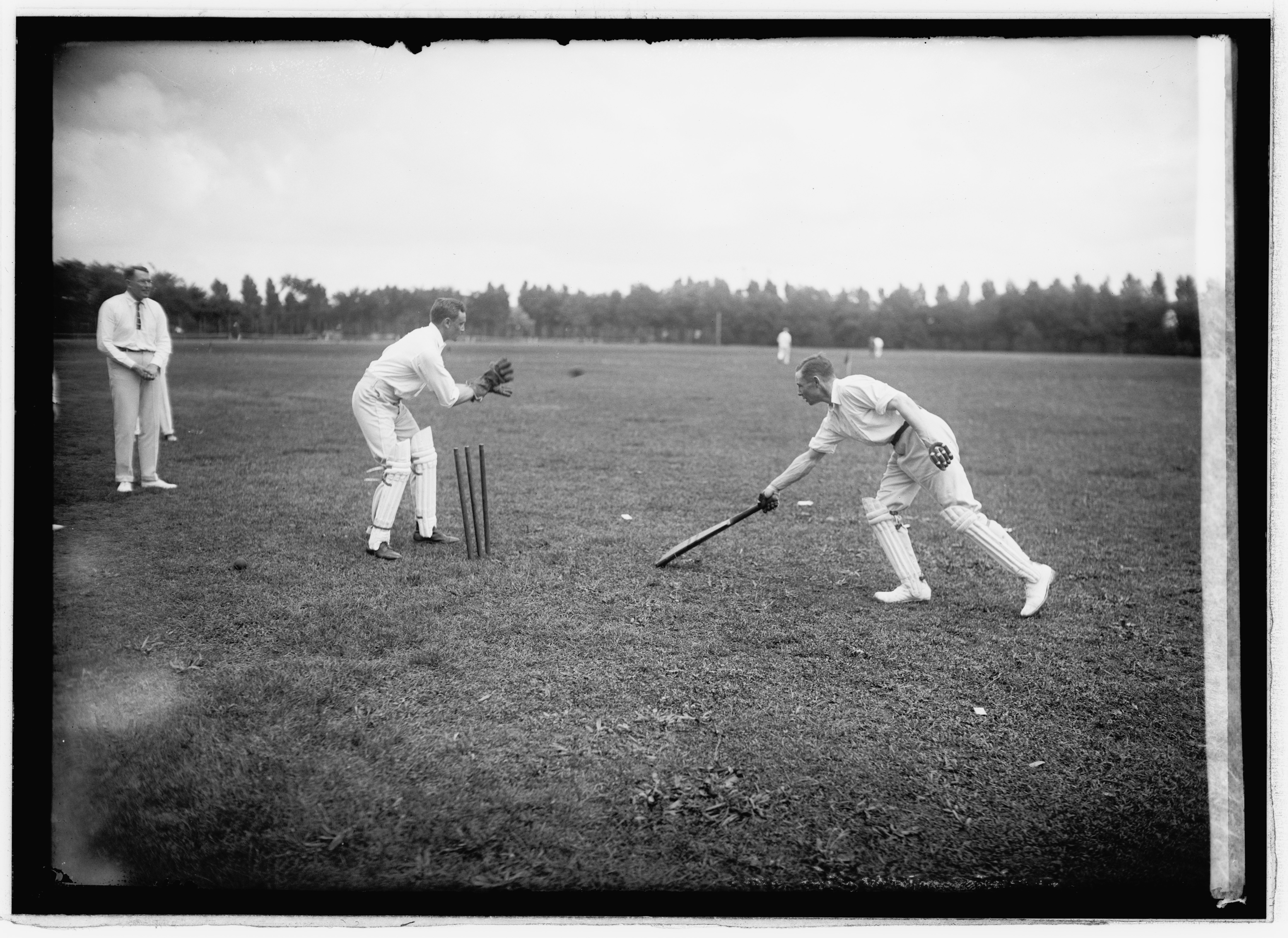
- Born: 1 April 1894; Melbourne, Australia
- Died: 18 May 1944 (aged 50); Barcelona, Spain
- Children: David Yencken, John, Elizabeth
- Parent: Edward Yencken
- Military career
- Allegiance: United Kingdom
- Branch: British Army
- Service years: 1914–1919
- Rank: Major
- Unit: Royal Field Artillery
- Conflicts: First World War
- Awards: Companion of the Order of St Michael and St George; Military Cross; Mentioned in Despatches
- Other work: Diplomat

Arthur Ferdinand Yencken CMG MC (1 April 1894 – 18 May 1944) was an Australian-born British Army officer and diplomat. He was killed in an aircrash in Spain on 18 May 1944.

== Early life ==
The son of Edward Yencken and his English-born wife Florence (née Orr), the family had built up a successful business over two generations. Like his father before him he was educated at Melbourne Church of England Grammar School and Corpus Christi College, Cambridge (BA 1919).

== War service ==
Yencken joined the British Army at the outbreak of the First World War, being commissioned as second lieutenant into the 6th London Brigade, Royal Field Artillery on 21 August 1914. He was raised to temporary lieutenant on 28 July 1915, which was made substantive on 1 June 1916 when he was also confirmed as a temporary captain. He was made a substantive captain on 1 July 1917. He was further promoted to acting major on 22 May 1918, while commanding a battery.

On 26 September 1917, he was awarded the Military Cross. The citation was carried on 10 January 1918 as below:

Lieutenant (Acting Captain) Arthur Ferdinand Yencken, R.F.A. For conspicuous gallantry and devotion to duty when his battery was being heavily shelled. He went to the rescue of several men who were imprisoned in a smashed dug-out, and persisted in digging them out. He subsequently put out the fire, which was threatening great damage to his battery position, under continuous and heavy shell fire.

Yencken relinquished his commission on 7 June 1919 as a major.

For his service as an acting major with 236 London Brigade, Royal Field Artillery he was mentioned in despatches by Sir Douglas Haig in the London Gazette on 7 July 1919.

== Diplomatic service ==
On 10 October 1919, his appointment as a Third Secretary in His Majesty's Diplomatic Service was announced in the London Gazette, and he was gazetted to the British Foreign Office, Diplomatic Service on 4 November 1919. The London Gazette carried an announcement of his appointment as a First Secretary from 15 July 1929. Yencken, was thus an Australian serving in the British Diplomatic Service. Australia did not have its own Foreign Service representation at this time.

Postings to Washington, USA, from 1920 to 1922, Berlin, Germany, from 1928 to 1932, Cairo, Egypt, as deputy High Commissioner from 1933 to 1936, and Rome, Italy, from 1937 to 1939 were followed by his appointment on 23 April 1939 to the British Embassy to Spain, then located in San Sebastian, with the rank of acting Counsellor. Following the Embassy's move back to Madrid in July 1940 he was given the local rank of Minister Plenipotentiary and in April 1941 also promoted to Counsellor. During his diplomatic posting to Spain he regularly acted as Chargé d'Affaires of the British Embassy. He died in an air crash in Spain at the age of 50 on 18 May 1944 while on diplomatic service.

== Tennis ==
Yencken was a championship level tennis player. He played at Wimbledon in 1914, the Australian Open on 9 December 1922, Wimbledon on 7 July 1923 and again 3 July 1926 and finally in 1927.

== Second World War ==
Under the Ambassador Sir Samuel Hoare, who was a political appointee, Yencken played a major role, with others in the Embassy, in working to ensure that Spain remained neutral and in preventing Franco from joining the Axis group. Yencken and wife Joyce also worked fearlessly in difficult and hostile conditions to repatriate to the UK Allied airmen having been being smuggled over the Pyrenees. She was a daughter of George Russell, a Victorian grazier. She with her sister grew up on his sheep station, Langi Willi, near Skipton.

On 12 June 1941 Yencken was appointed a Companion of the Order of St Michael and St George at which time he held the position "Minister Plenipotentiary at His Majesty's Embassy in Madrid". At the time of his death he was British Chargé d'Affaires, Madrid.

April 1942 - Mr Arthur Yencken, British Minister in Madrid and his wife came to Gibraltar to meet Mr. R.G. Casey, ex Governor of Bengal, who was in Gibraltar on his way to Cairo to take up his post as British Minister Middle East. Mr. Casey had been the best man at the Yencken’s wedding.

Yencken died on 18 May 1944 in an air crash south of Barcelona, Spain, when a small aircraft flown by the Assistant Air Attache at Madrid, Squadron Leader H. C. Caldwell, crashed in bad weather killing the pilot, Yencken and a Spanish engineer.

== Family ==
On 5 June 1925 he married Mary Joyce Russell in St. Margarets, Westminster.

In 1948 his widow married Sir Denys Pilditch, the wartime director of counter-espionage in India. Joyce lived with him in England until her death in 1975, coincidentally in Madrid, though she returned frequently to Australia where her children John, Elizabeth, and David lived. His eldest son was Dr. John Yencken (1926–2012) distinguished for his services to science in Australia. His youngest son was David Yencken (1931–2019) distinguished for his services to history, design and conservation in Australia.

The Australian Press announced in December 1944 that Yencken's will left an estate valued at £96,446.
