= David Yencken =

Australian businessman, entreprenuer, advisor, academic

Professor David Yencken AO
- Born: 3 June 1931; Berlin, Germany
- Died: 21 September 2019 (aged 88); Melbourne, Australia
- Citizenship: Australia
- Education: University of Cambridge
- Occupations: Entreprenuer, academic, public servant, consultant
- Years active: 1954—2019
- Parent(s): Arthur Ferdinand Yencken and Mary Joyce Russell
- Awards: Victorian Architecture Medal 1970, Robin Boyd Environmental Award 1972
- Practice: Merchant Builders, Tract Consultants
- Projects: The Black Dolphin Motel, Elliston Estate, Winter Park

David George Druce Yencken AO (3 June 3 1931 – 21 September 2019) was a builder, businessman, public servant, academic and heritage practitioner in Australia.

== Family and early history ==
David Yencken was born in Berlin. His father was an Australian-born British Army officer and diplomat Arthur Ferdinand Yencken (1894–1944) and his mother was Mary Joyce Russell. They were married on 5 June 1925 at St. Margarets, Westminster. The family moved several times so that Yencken spent his early years between Berlin (1928–1931), Cairo (1932–1936), Rome, Madrid (1939–1940), and then when the families of embassy staff were evacuated due to the Spanish Civil War, he lived in Australia from 1940 to 1942, then returned to Spain and then to school in England. His father died in an air crash in Spain in May 1944. David had an elder brother Dr. John Yencken (1926–2012) who was an Australian scientist. David attended school in England and Australia, and was awarded a Bachelor of Arts degree by the University of Cambridge majoring in History.

== Professional career ==
=== Arrives in Australia ===
In his early twenties Yencken decided on a short visit to Australia, arriving in Sydney via Canada in 1954, and then drove to Melbourne in a borrowed car. He soon decided to stay, and his first business venture was Brummels Gallery in South Yarra, which focussed on contemporary Modernist Australian painting, sculpture and prints.

"I opened the gallery in 1956 in partnership with Pat Collins, the owner of the coffee shop below the gallery. The gallery was devoted to Australian painting and at the time of its opening was one of only two with this focus in Melbourne. Although I didn't run the gallery for long, it was for me a significant experience…" The first gallery of this type, Australian Galleries in Collingwood, had opened just five months earlier.

=== The Black Dolphin Motel ===
During his travels through Canada he was introduced to "several wonders of the new world: hamburgers, three-minute car washes and motels"; motels were something not seen in the UK or Australia in the mid 1950s, and he decided to build one. Buying land on the highway at the edge of Bairnsdale, he opened one of the first motels in Australia (and the first in country Victoria), in 1957, the Mitchell Valley Motel, designed by architects Mockridge Stahle & Mitchell (demolished in 2008). The success of this venture led to him being approached to part own, develop and operate another in Merimbula, NSW, The Black Dolphin, which opened in 1961, and was designed by noted modernist architect and critic Robin Boyd. The project architect was a young Graeme Gunn, and the use of undressed tree-trunk posts, natural finishes, and native planting was an early example of bush aesthetic in Australian architecture.

=== Merchant Builders ===
After discussions with Robin Boyd, in 1965 Yencken co-founded Merchant Builders Pty Ltd., with architect Graeme Gunn, landscape designer Ellis Stones and timber merchant John Ridge. The philosophy of the company was to provide architect designed homes that emphasised the unique characteristics of the Australian landscape with a vision of creating architect-designed houses that were at project home prices. In 1969 the firm's first foray into larger concerns was the Elliston Estate in Rosanna, where a sense of flowing native landscape on an existing subdivision was created, and a range of house designs by four architects – Charles Duncan, Daryl Jackson and Evan Walker, McGlashan Everist and Graeme Gunn. They then pioneered the concept of cluster housing, where groups of homes share a communal landscaped setting of dense native planting, firstly at Winter Park in Doncaster, built 1970—1974, and Vermont Park in 1977, which included a clubhouse and swimming pool. Winter Park led the Victorian Government to introduce the Cluster Titles Act 1974, and in 1975 it received a citation in the Royal Australian Institute of Architect's Housing Awards.

In 1968, Yencken commissioned Gunn to design a holiday house called Baronda, in what is now Nelson Lagoon Mimosa Rocks National Park in NSW, created in part by his gift of the property to the state in 1973.

Merchant Builders won three Victorian Architecture Medals including the Molesworth Street Townhouses by Graeme Gunn in 1970, several other architectural awards and the inaugural Robin Boyd Environmental Award for changing the face of residential Melbourne in 1972.

=== Tract Consultants ===
Yencken founded the planning and landscape architect firm Tract Consultants, around the same time, holding positions of Chairman and Managing Director between 1971 and 1979. Tract was often the landscape designer for homes built by for Merchant Builders, including Vermont Park.

== Public service ==
Following a commitment generally to better preserve the environment by the Whitlam Labour Government in the early 1970s, a Committee of Inquiry into the National Estate (the 'Hope Inquiry') was established in 1973, with Yencken as one of six members, which produced the seminal Report on the National Estate in April 1974. The National Estate was broadly defined, evaluating equally the natural environment, Aboriginal places, and historical structures and landscapes. Yencken was then appointed Chairman of the Interim Committee on the National Estate, which led to the formation of the Australian Heritage Commission which he then chaired from 1975–1981, with their first meeting on 27 July 1976. The main work of the Commission was the creation of the Register of the National Estate, a comprehensive overview of the Australian heritage places, which had more than 13,000 listings when it abolished by the Howard government in 2004. The Register was innovative for including sites of natural and historic value, as of equal importance as the built environment. In regard to architectural heritage, Yencken said that :

"We collectively reached the view that the only way to avoid bias in listing caused by temporarily prevailing architectural likes and dislikes, was to seek to list the best examples of each style period."

He was appointed Secretary (Chief Executive) of the Ministry for Planning and Environment 1982–1987, by the Minister for Planning Evan Walker in the new Cain Labor Government. During his time he oversaw a number of major initiatives including; a new Metropolitan Policy and State Conservation Strategy; a comprehensive plan for the redevelopment of the Melbourne CBD and Southbank; numerous legislative changes; and local planning initiatives.

Professor Yencken oversaw the initial moves towards the rejuvenation of Southbank. At the time the precinct was made up of old factories and warehouses, and it was widely felt that the city had 'turned its back on the Yarra River'. A lot of our work in the initial instance focused on the central area of Melbourne because there was such a sense of neglect and lack of policy direction This lack of effective action was being expressed in papers like The Age on a very regular basis. We had a big program and that included Southbank. The first changes, the Southbank Promenade and the Evan Walker Footbridge, were completed after he left the Ministry.

In 1988, he developed the concept of The Creative City, which has since become a global movement reflecting a new planning paradigm for cities. It was first described in his article 'The Creative City', published in the literary journal Meanjin. In this article Yencken argues that while cities must be efficient and fair, a creative city must also be one that is committed to fostering creativity among its citizens and to providing emotionally satisfying places and experiences for them.

Yencken served as the inaugural Chairman of Australia ICOMOS in 1976, was joint leader of the Australian Delegation to the UNESCO World Heritage Committee in 1988 and 1981 and his other public roles included the Prime Minister's Urban Design Taskforce in 1994 and 1995, chair of the Design Committee of the Australia Council for the Arts, and President and later Patron of the Australian Conservation Foundation.

Yenken held the Elisabeth Murdoch Chair of Landscape Architecture and Environmental Planning from 1988 to 1997, then was Professor of Landscape Architecture and Environmental Planning, and later Professor Emeritus all at the University of Melbourne.

== Writing ==
Yencken wrote or edited seven books and many essays, journal articles and conference proceedings. His publications include:

- Report of the Interim Committee on the National Estate, May 1975
- Community aspirations and professional responsibility for historic conservation, Australian Heritage Commission, 1980.
- 'The Creative City', Meanjin, Volume 47 Issue 4 (Summer 1988)
- Multifunction Polis: Social Issues Study, Department of Industry, Technology and Commerce, Canberra, 1989
- Restoring the Land: Environmental Values, Knowledge, and Action, David G. Evans, David Yencken, and Laurie Cosgrove, Melbourne University Press, Carlton, 1994.
- Resetting the compass: Australia's journey towards sustainability, David Yencken & Debra Wilkinson, Collingwood, Victoria, CSIRO Publishing, c2000
- Into the future: the neglect of the long term in Australian politics, Ian Marsh and David Yencken, Australian Collaboration in conjunction with Black Inc., Melbourne, 2004
- Valuing Australia's National Heritage, Future Leaders, Albert Park, Victoria, 2019.

== Awards and honours ==
Yencken has received the following awards:

- Robin Boyd Environmental Award, 1972 (RAIA Victoria Chapter)
- Queen Elizabeth II Silver Jubilee Medal, 1977
- Officer of the Order of Australia (AO) for services to conservation and history, 14 June 1982
- Special Australian Institute of Landscape Architects Award for the greening of Swanston Street as part of Victoria's 150th celebrations (Victorian Planning Department)
- Planning Institute of Australia Lifetime Achievement Award
- City of Melbourne Lord Mayor's Prize, 2001
- Honorary Fellow of the Planning Institute of Australia
- Honorary Fellow of the Australian Institute of Landscape Architects
- Royal Australian Planning Institute award for central Melbourne pedestrianisation, street planning and Yarra River bank works (Victorian Planning Department)

== See also ==
- Creative city
