= Graeme Gunn =

Australian architect (born 1933)

Graeme Gunn AM
- Born: August 6, 1933; Geelong, Victoria, Australia
- Died: October 1, 2024 (aged 91); Hamilton, Victoria, Australia
- Education: RMIT University (then Royal Melbourne Institute of Technology)
- Occupation: Architect
- Spouse: Suzy a'Beckett Boyd
- Awards: 1966 & 1970 RAIA Bronze Medal, Victoria; 1980 Victorian Architecture Medal; 2007 Maggie Edmond Enduring Architecture Award; 2011 Royal Australian Institute of Architects Gold Medal
- Buildings: Plumbers and Gasfitters Employees Union Building, Winter Park, Ararat Arts Activity Centre, Kew Townhouses

Graeme Cecil Gunn AM (6 August 1933 – 1 October 2024) was an Australian architect and Dean of the Faculty of Architecture at RMIT.

== Early life ==
Graeme Cecil Gunn was born in Geelong, Victoria, on 6 August 1933. The family moved to Hamilton in Western Victoria in 1935. Gunn briefly worked for his father, who was a builder in Hamilton nicknamed "Gable Gunn" for his distinctive extended ridge lines.

== Architecture career ==
Gunn left Hamilton to study architecture at the Royal Melbourne Institute of Technology in 1956 (later RMIT University). He worked at Grounds, Romberg and Boyd, before starting his own residential practice in 1962.

Gunn was head of the School of Architecture and Building at RMIT from 1972 to 1977 and Dean of the Faculty of Architecture and Building from 1977 to 1982.

== Recognition ==
In 2001, Gunn was awarded the RAIA Victorian Chapter President's Prize for lifetime contribution to Victorian architecture.

In 2007 the Plumbers and Gasfitters Employees Union Building built in 1970 was presented with the Maggie Edmond Enduring Architecture Award.

In 2011 Graeme Gunn was awarded the Australian Institute of Architects Gold Medal.

On 11 June 2012 Gunn was recognised with a Member of the Order of Australia (AM) "for service to architecture, to the promotion of innovative urban design, to professional education, and as a supporter of emerging architects."

== Personal life ==
Gunn was married twice, first to Grazia and later to landscape architect Suzy a'Beckett Penleigh Boyd (1954—2016) daughter of architect Robin Boyd.

== Notable projects ==
=== Slorach Residence ===
Construction date: 2009

The encompassing living environment of the Hamilton Courtyard House is achieved through the union of built form, spatial sequences, landscape and scale.

=== Winter Park ===
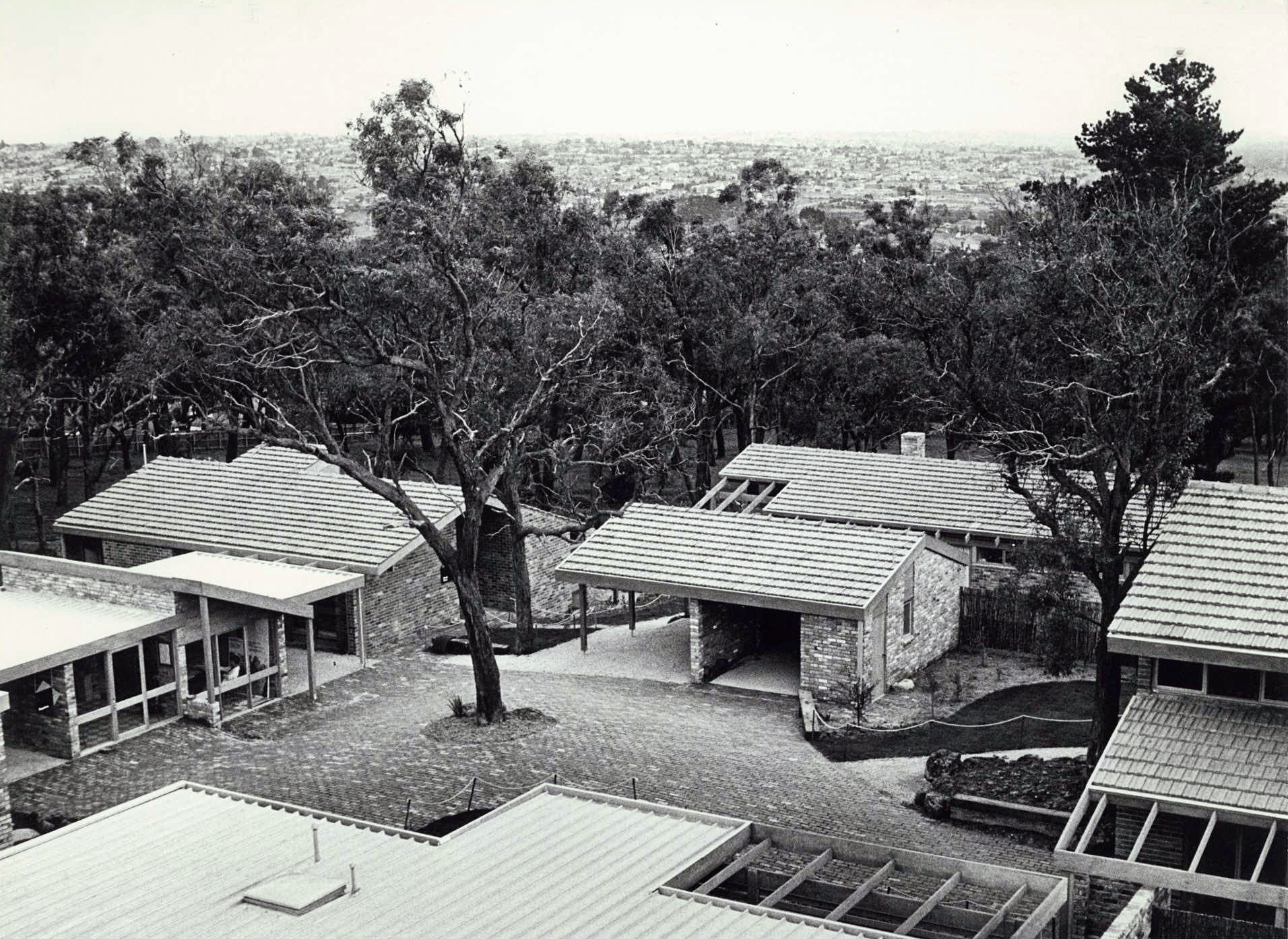
Winter Park, Doncaster, Victoria

Construction date: 1971

Winter Park was Graeme's first cluster housing project. It was designed and implemented in association with Merchant Builders Pty Ltd in 1971 and has subsequently remained a seminal departure from the traditional method of suburban subdivision. Winter Park is now on the Heritage Victoria list and in 2007 was adjudged by an expert panel, consisting mostly of architects, as one of the 29 most worthy buildings produced since the inauguration of the first AIA awards. The basic tenet of the cluster housing concept is that of a comprehensively planned development in which a group of houses are sited to optimise available land in a much more efficient and environmentally sensitive manner than that provided by the normal rectangular grid lot suburban subdivision. Excess land is aggregated to provide communal open space. Houses are sited to relate sympathetically with each other, to optimise privacy, solar orientation, views and physical conditions.

=== Plumbers and Gasfitters Employees Union Building ===
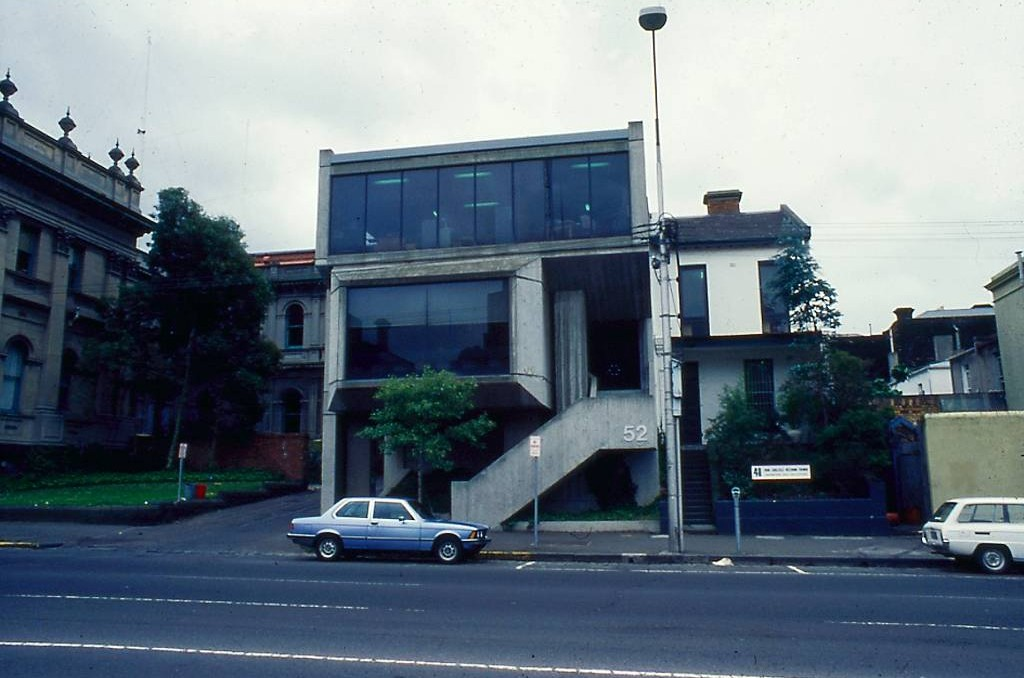
Plumbers and Gasfitters building front facade

Construction date: 1970

Located at 52 Victoria Street Melbourne, the Plumbers and Gasfitters Employees Union Building is known as the most persisting and noticeable landmark of Brutalism. The building was completed in 1970 by Graeme Gunn and his creative collaboration with Merchant Builders and landscape architect Ellis Stones. The design itself was architecturally intended to be up to date. The facade is formed of concrete in bold expressionistic forms with dark smoked glazing that intensify the sculptural quality of the construction. Structurally designed to receive an extra floor when needed, the building consists of a car parking and mechanical services area, one main office floor housing the clients, conference room and lobby, and one office of lettable space. For the internal finishes, walls, concrete block work, and stud frame sheeted with plywood are painted. The addition of signage on the building is slightly unsympathetic to the building's initial character.

=== Baronda Residence ===
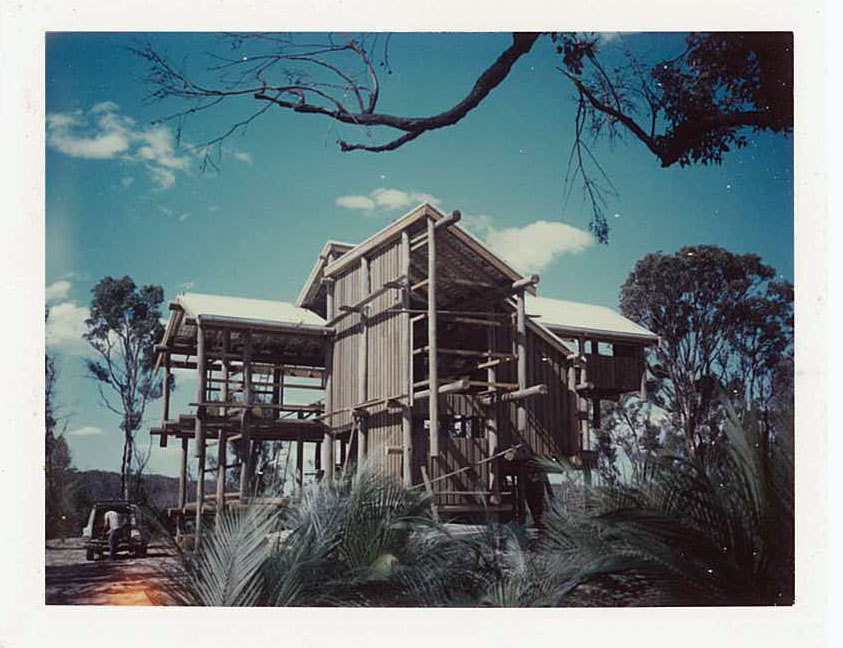
Baronda residence under construction

Construction date: 1968

The design is based on a 2700 orthogonal matrix using natural tree trunks, some 10 metres long farmed from a local plantation owned by Sir Roy Grounds and Ken Myer.

The vertical and horizontal grid of the matrix defines the spaces, the floors of which radiate from the central staircase, each floor raise a half level above the previous and in a location 90-degree different from the one below. Services are minimal, there being no public utilities (gas, water, electricity or sewerage). The timber theme generated by the structure is continued with infill timber studs within the pole grid and clad internally and externally with timber boarding. The floors are EX 50x100 mm tongue and grooved planks spanning 1350 mm. These, in turn form the ceilings for those rooms having a full height below. Ceilings directly below the roof consist of sisal lining over 150mm square wire mesh. Some years ago the owner of this property and some of adjacent properties along the coast deeded the contiguous properties as part of a state park to the NSW government to ensure retention of the pristine coastal environment, reserved for public use only.

=== Townhouses at 76 Molesworth Street, Kew ===
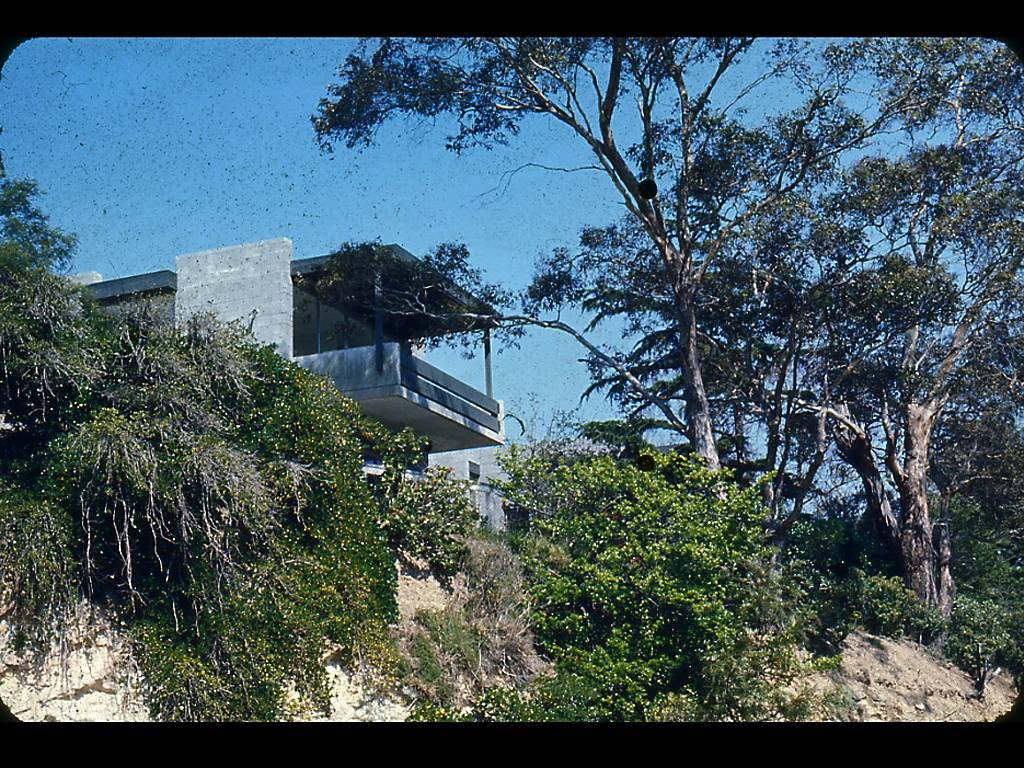
Molesworth Street

Construction date: 1968

Designed for family living these six concrete block, Brutalist style townhouses, consist of three bedrooms, two living areas and a double carport (now converted to a garage) with an open private courtyard. The building expresses simple construction materials of concrete for the main structure, timber for the roof structure and metal deck as the roof cladding. Off-form concrete balconies project from the concrete block building, with timber handrails.

The Townhouses are significant as an important design progression in the re-thinking of suburban, cluster style living. The houses are included on the Schedule to the Heritage Overlay and Graded as "A" class.

Today: This project retains many of its original features and remains structurally intact, and has only received minor upgrading of timber handrails and window frames.

Award: 1970 Bronze Medal Award, Victorian Chapter of the RAIA. In the Boroondara Municipality only three other residential projects have won this award.

== Selected other projects ==
- Biles Residence

Location: Melbourne, Victoria

Construction date: 2006

- Austin Vineyard

Location: Sutherland Creek, Victoria

Construction date: 2006

- Crawford River Wineries

Location: Condah, Victoria

Construction date: 2002

- Portland Aerodrome

Location: Portland, Victoria

Construction date: 1981

- Prahran Market

Location: Prahran, Victoria

Construction date: 1979

== Awards ==
- 2012 Member (AM) in the General Division of the Order of Australia, for service to architecture, to the promotion of innovative urban design, to professional education, and as a supporter of emerging architects.
- 2011 Australian Institute of Architects Gold Medal
- 2007 Maggie Edmond Enduring Architecture Award — Plumbers and Gasfitters Employees Union Building
- 2001 President's award for Lifetime Contribution to Victorian Architecture
- 1996 Honorary Doctorate of Architecture, RMIT
- 1988 Royal Australian Institute of Architects Merit Awards for Outstanding Architecture — Bridge Hotel Mordialloc
- 1988 Royal Australian Institute of Architects Merit Awards for Outstanding Architecture — RACV Club refurbishments
- 1984 Royal Australian Institute of Architects Merit Awards for Outstanding Architecture — Melbourne City Baths
- 1983 Royal Australian Institute of Architects Merit Awards for Outstanding Architecture — Portland Aerodrome Terminal Building
- 1982 Royal Australian Institute of Architects Merit Awards for Outstanding Architecture — Prahran Municipal Market
- 1980 Victorian Architecture Medal — Ararat Arts Activity Centre
- 1976 Royal Australian Institute of Architects Citation — AMWSU Headquarters
- 1976 Royal Australian Institute of Architects Citation — Chelsworth Park Pavilion
- 1975 Royal Australian Institute of Architects Citation — Winter Park cluster housing
- 1971 Royal Australian Institute of Architects Citation — Royal South Yarra Lawn Tennis Club
- 1970 Bronze Medal Award, Victorian Chapter of the RAIA — Townhouses, 76 Molesworth Street, Kew
- 1970 Royal Australian Institute of Architects Citation — Plumbers and Gasfitters Employees Union Building
- 1966 Bronze Medal Award, Victorian Chapter of the RAIA — Richardson House

== Publications ==
2010 – present

- Sullivan, Leanne, Who’s Who in Australia 2012, Crown Content Pty Ltd, Melbourne p. 958
- Bernstone, Rachel "Pulse" In Design; Issue 47 (2011) pp. 196–197
- Rizzo R, "Square Roots" Architectural Review Australia; Summer 2010/2011 pp. 78–85
- Harrison S, 'A Place in the Sun' Thames & Hudson Australia 2010 pp. 168–173
- Tonkin P, "Revisited Baronda House" Houses; Issue 77 (Dec 2010) pp. 130–136
- Architect Victoria, Victorian Architecture Awards 2010, p. 101
- O’Brian K, "Fine style dissolves boundaries", The Age, 24 April 2010, Domain pp. 11–13
- Gunn G, "Graeme Gunn", Architect Victoria, Summer 2010, pp. 22–23

2000-2009

- Goad P, "Melbourne Architecture", Watermark Architectural Guides, revised and expanded 2009
- Mornement, A. & Biles, A., Infill: New Houses for Urban Sites, London: Laurence King Publishing Ltd., 2009
- Architect Victoria, RAIA Victoria Awards 2007, p. 54
- Crafti S, "Delivering the Unexpected", InDesign; No 25, May 2006 p. 98
- Gunn G, "Occupation"’, Architecture Victoria: Winter 2005, p. 12
- Gunn G, "A Case for Sustainability", Architect Victoria Winter 2003, pp. 21–23
- Bertram N, "A Short History of Melbourne Architecture" (Book Review), Architecture Australia, Dec 2002, p. 46
- McDougall I, "President's Prize", Architect Victoria, Winter 2001 p. 8
- Selenitsch A, "The Gunn Atrium", Transition; No. 61-62, 2000, pp. 140–151

1990-1999

- Giannini E, "The Speculative Suburb: What vision for our suburbs?", Architect, Mar 1991, pp. 5–9
- "Interior Design: The Crossley Hotel", Architecture Australia, Vol 80 No 2 Mar 1991, pp. 67–69
- Dickinson M, "Putting Off the Ritz", Belle, No 111 Jun/Jul 1992 pp. 96–101
- Friis Clark A, "Corporate Headquarters: Haymes Paint", Corporate and Office Design, Vol 8 No 4, 1992 pp. 140–142
- "Bold Roofscapes", BCME, Vol 34 No 21 Number 242 Oct 1993 pp. 7–8
- "Case studies: Bold Roofscapes Strike a Chord in Steel", Architecture Australia, Vol 82 No 5 Sep/Oct 1993, p. 76

1980-1989

- Gunn G, "A No- frills Lifestyle" [Redlich House] Australian Home Beautiful, June 1980
- "State Library/ Museum Competition: Graeme Gunn and Perrott Lyon Mathieson", Architect, Apr 1986, pp. 14–15
- "Survey: Melbourne Bayside Project", Constructional Review, Vol 60 No 3 Aug 1987, P..5
- Calhoun S, "Haven in South Yarra" Landscape Australia, No 4 Nov 1988 pp. 387–390
- Clerehan N, "RAIA Victorian Chapter Awards 1988: Commercial Alterations: Winner", Architect, Aug 1988, pp. 11–14
- Rijavec I, "RAIA Victorian Chapter Awards 1988: Interior Architecture: Winner", Architect, Aug 1988, pp. 25, 27-28
- Bagnall D, "Simple Arithmetic", Vogue Living, Vol 23 No 5, Jun/Jul 1989, pp. 114–117
- "Interiors: Dual Purpose Art Gallery", Architecture Australia, Vol 78 No 2 Mar 1989, pp. 91–92
- "Interiors: RACV Club Refurbishment", Architecture Australia, Vol 78 No 3 Apr 1989, pp. 66–67

1970-1979

- "Townhouses, 76 Molesworth Street, Kew, Victoria", Architecture in Australia, Volume 59, number 5, October 1970.
- "New Union Building", Architect, volume 3, number 14, July - August 1971
- "Union Headquarters", Constructional Review, Volume 44, number 3, August 1971
- Gunn G, "Winter Park [& Elliston], for Merchant Builders" In McKay, I. et al., Living and Partly Living, Housing in Australia, Nelson, Melbourne 1971
- Gunn G, "Baronda, House for David Yencken" in McKay I, Living and Partly Living, Housing in Australia, Melbourne 1971
- Gunn G, "Molesworth Street Townhouses for Merchant Builders", in McKay I, Living and Partly Living, Housing in Australia, Nelson, Melbourne 1971
- Boyd R, "A Lead from the Plumbers", The Sunday Australian, 6 June 1971.
- "Office, Plumbers and Gasfitters Employees Union", Architecture in Australia, Volume 61, Number 4, August 1972
- "Awards", [Royal South Yarra Tennis Club], Architect, Volume 3, number 5, November/December
- "AMWU Office Building; Fresh Approach, Fitting Result", Architecture Today, October–November
- "Gunn Hayball, A Scheme to make Everyone Happy" [Prahran Market], Melbourne Times 31 July 1974
- Gunn G, Winter Park cluster housing, in Tanner H, Australian Housing in the Seventies, Ure Smith Sydney, 1976
- Gunn G, Bracklyn Apartments, in Tanner, H, Australian Housing in the Seventies, Ure Smith Sydney, 1976
- Gunn G, Baronda House for David Yencken, in Yencken, Davis & Gunn, Perception, Expectation and Experience, in Seddon G. & Davis M. Man and Landscape in Australia, Towards an Ecological Vision, Government Printing Service, Canberra, 1976

1960-1969

- Clarke J, "Search for an Australian House [Gas & Fuel Competition House]", The Age, 5 April 1965
- "Residence at Essendon, Vic.", Architecture and Arts, volume 13, number 5, May 1965
- "House Folds inside its own Allotment" [Stradwick House], The Australian Home Beautiful, October
- "Victorian Architecture Medal 1966, House", [Richardson House], Architecture in Australia, Volume 55, number 3, May 1966,
- Cross Section No. 161, March 1966
- Cross Section No. 166, August 1966
- "Domestic Award, House at Essendon", [Richardson House], Architecture & Arts, Volume 14, Number 3, March 1966, pp. 18
- Paterson, J, Yencken, D., & Gunn, G, A Mansion or no House, Report for the U.D.I.A. on the consequences of planning standards and their impact on land and housing, Hawthorn Press Melbourne 1967
- Gunn G, "Merchant Builder Houses, Melbourne, Victoria", in Sowden H, Towards an Australian Architecture, Sydney 1968.
- Gunn G, "Pine-mont Preschool, Ringwood, Victoria", in Sowden H, Towards an Australian Architecture, Sydney 1968
