= Plumbers and Gasfitters Employees Union Building =

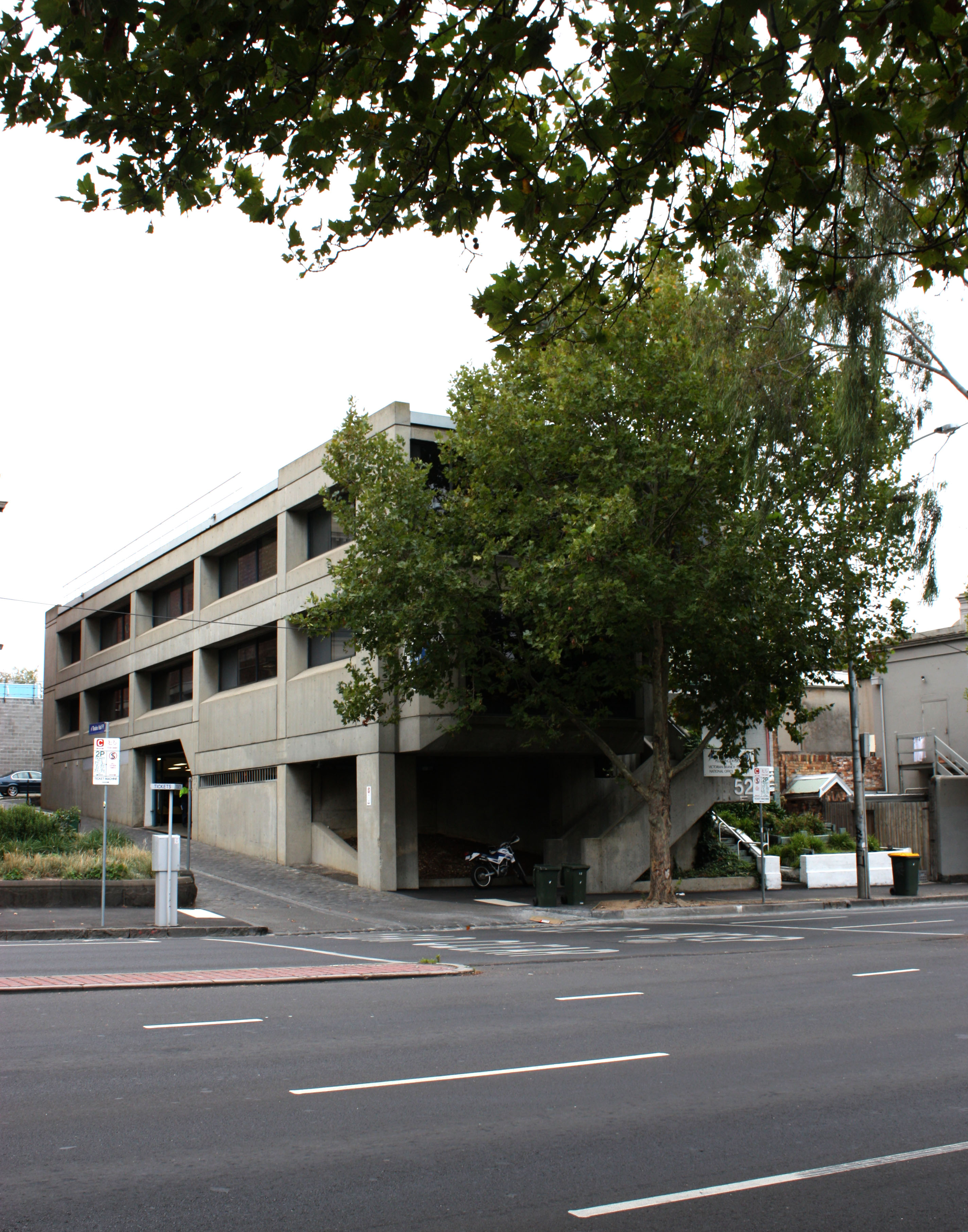
- PGEUB, Melbourne, Victoria
- Interactive map of the Plumbers and Gasfitters Employees Union Building area

General information
- Type: Office building
- Architectural style: Brutalist
- Location: 52 Victoria Street, Carlton, Victoria, Australia
- Coordinates: 37.806863°S 144.966743°E
- Construction started: 1969
- Completed: 1971

Design and construction
- Architect: Graeme Gunn
- Main contractor: Merchant Builders

The Plumbers and Gasfitters Employees Union Building (PGEUB) is an office building for the Plumbing Trades Employees Union, located in the suburb of Carlton, Melbourne, Victoria. It was commissioned in 1969 with architect Graeme Gunn to design it, in creative collaboration with landscape designer Ellis Stones, and Merchant Builders. Construction was completed in 1971. The design itself was architecturally intended to be up to date.

== Plumbers and Gasfitters Employees Union ==
The Plumbers and Gasfitters Employees Union was formed in 1911 was originally housed in the Trades Hall complex on the corner of Victoria and Lygon Streets, Carlton. However the union had outgrown these premises by the late 1960s, and a commission was issued to Graeme Gunn to design the new building, next door to Trades Hall. In 1993, the union amalgamated with others to become the Communications, Electrical, Electronic, Energy, Information, Postal, Plumbing and Allied Services Union of Australia.

== Design and features ==
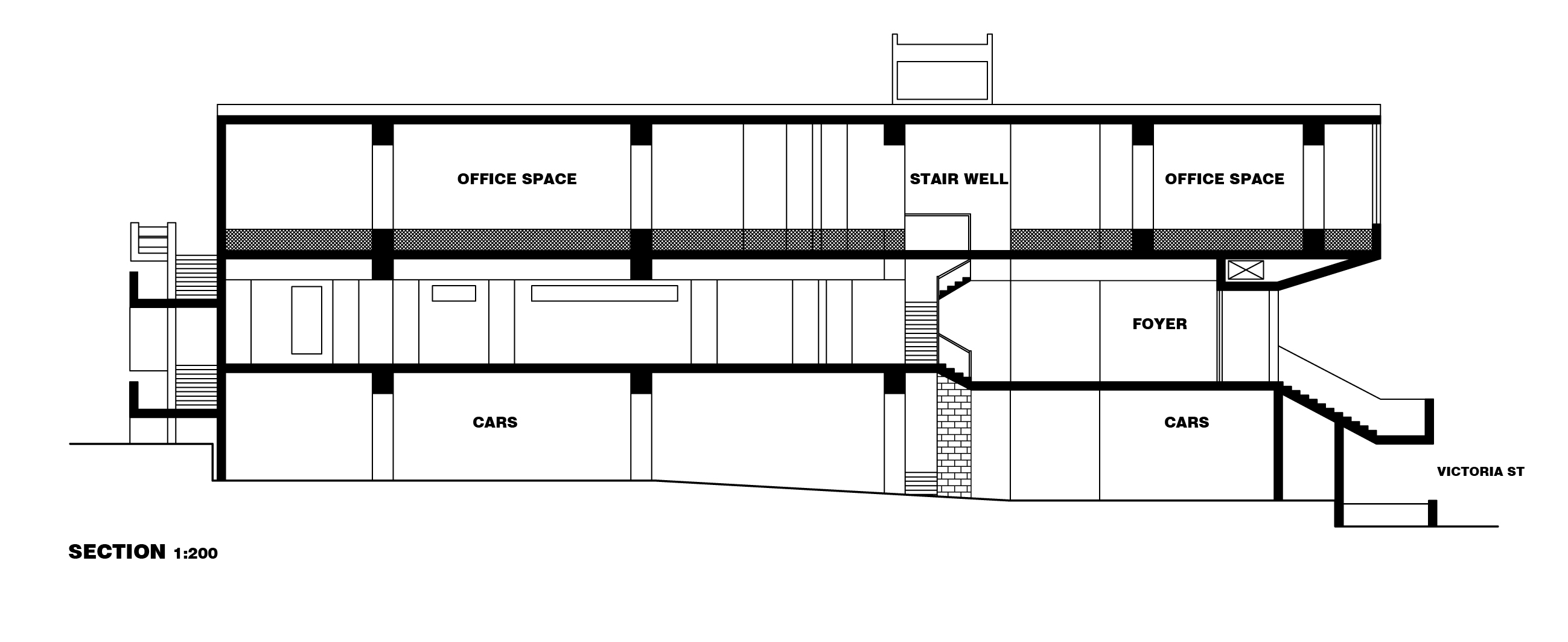
Section - PGEUB

The ground floor consists of a car park and space to house mechanical services, and the first and second floors are office spaces including conference rooms and a lobby. The building has been structurally designed so that if or when required, an extra floor can be added. Current access to the upper floors is via stairs, however a lift-well has been constructed in case of the planned extension is eventually built.

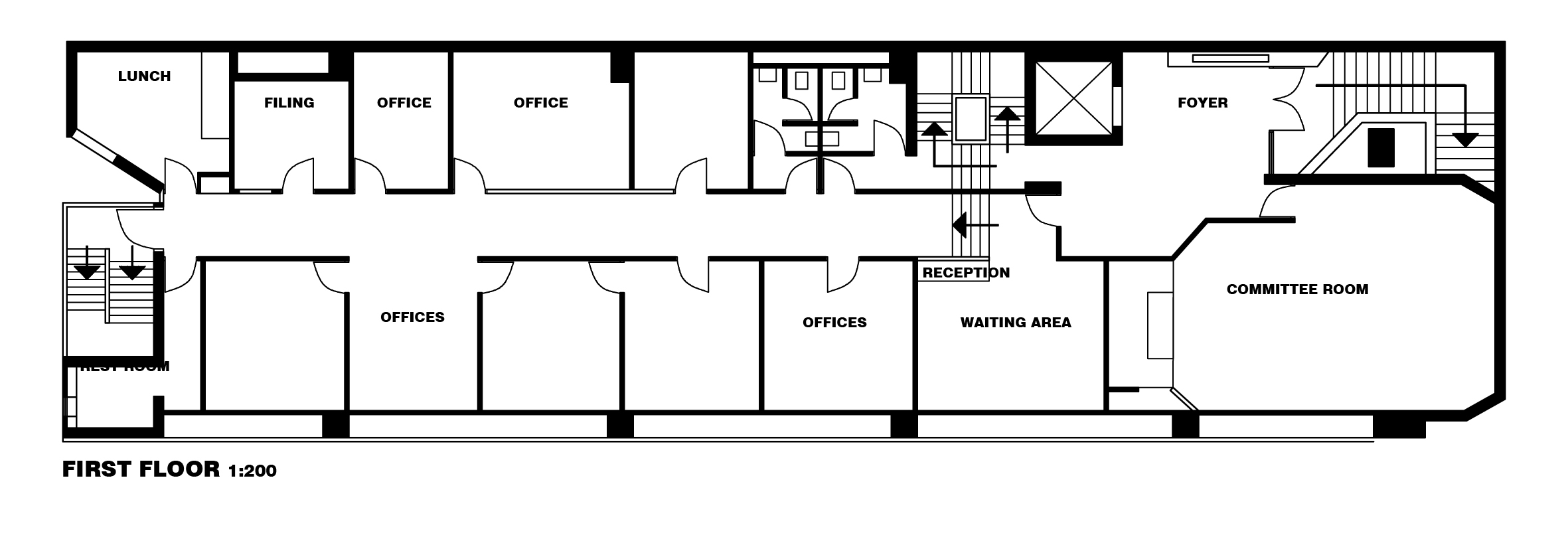
First Floor Plan - PGEUB

The design emphases the raw structure and materiality of the building, which is composed mostly of off-form concrete, with the material left exposed on the outer surfaces of the building and in some interiors spaces also. For the internal finishes, walls, concrete block work, and stud frame sheeted with plywood are painted. A rough-sawn timber stairwell relieves the strictness of the concrete and glass uniformity. The facade is formed of concrete in bold expressionistic forms with dark smoked glazing that intensify the sculptural quality of the construction. The windows on the east facade are deeply recessed to reduce sun exposure and are glazed with tinted glass. The west facade windows provide natural ventilation to the office areas whereas the rest of the building requires mechanical ventilation.

=== Brutalist architecture ===
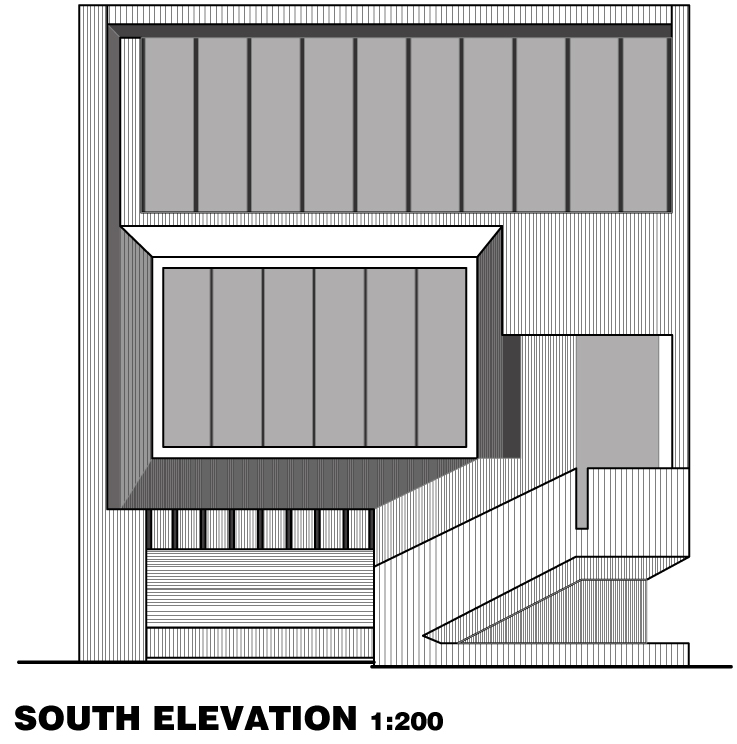
South Elevation - PGEUB

The Plumbers and Gasfitters Employees’ Union Building is regarded as one of the finest examples of Brutalist architecture in Victoria, and has proven to be a seminal essay in the development of the Brutalist vernacular, along with the Harold Holt Memorial Swimming Pool (1969). The design articulated key ethical and aesthetic directives which influenced architecture in Victoria throughout the 1970s, such directives which included:

- Unorthodox arrangement of masses and voids
- The honest valuation of construction materials and exposure of natural finishes
- Transparency of program through the plan
- Emphasis on circulation

Due to the cultural and architectural significance, the PGEUB has a State Level of Cultural Heritage, under the category of Trade Union Office, issued by the Australian National Trust.
