= Winter Park cluster housing =

Housing estate in Melbourne, Australia

Coordinates: 37.777667°S 145.113139°E

Winter Park is a housing estate designed by award-winning architect Graeme Gunn and developed by both Rob White and Merchant Builders. It is located at 131—147 High Street, Doncaster, Victoria and is 2.43 hectares in size. The design consists of twenty detached houses and was constructed in two stages between 1970 and 1974. Gunn's residential project is described as “an outstanding example of careful design extended into a consideration of the importance of landscape and open space and, ultimately, the presence and feel of a place”.

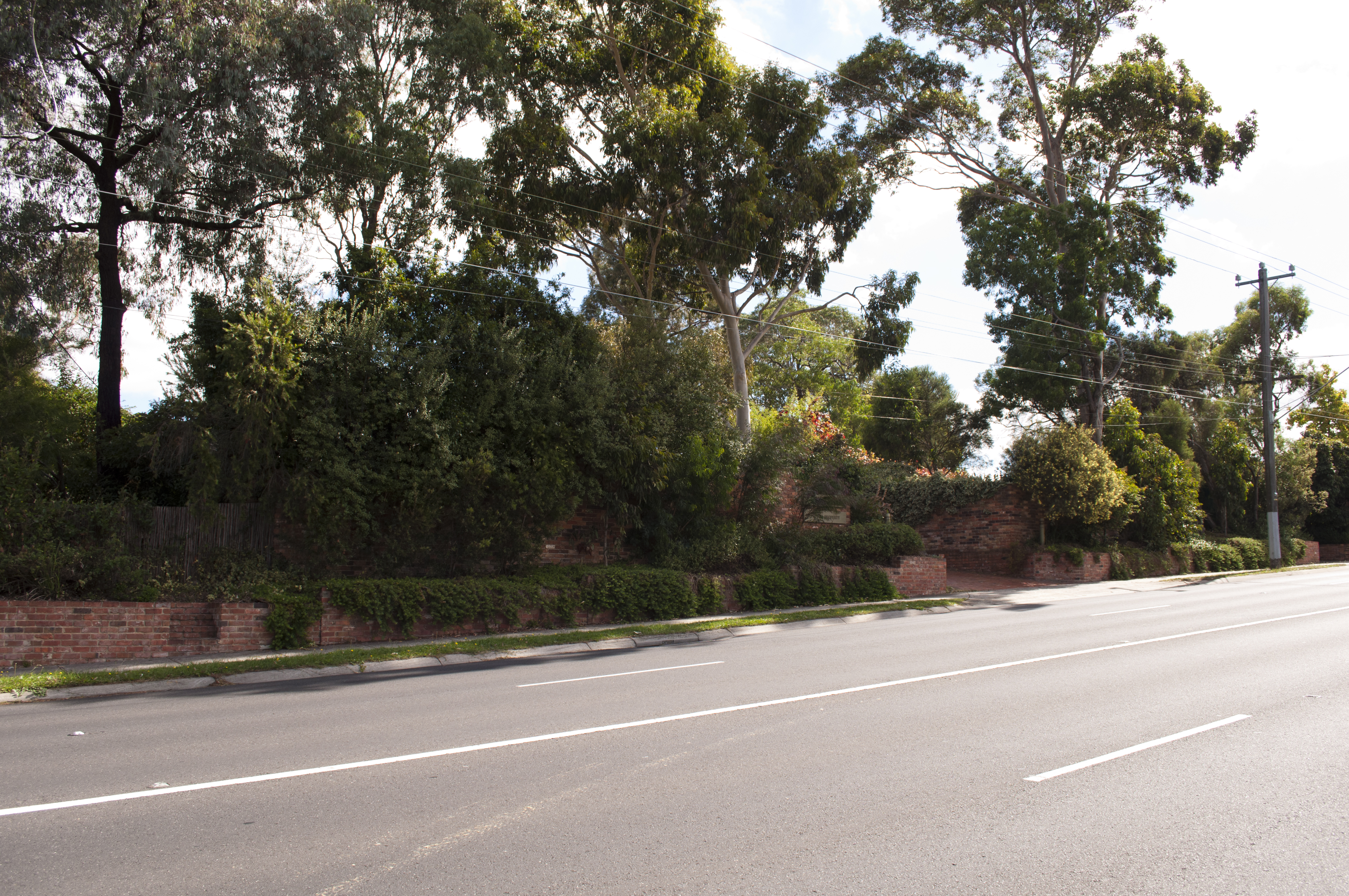
High street view of Winter Park

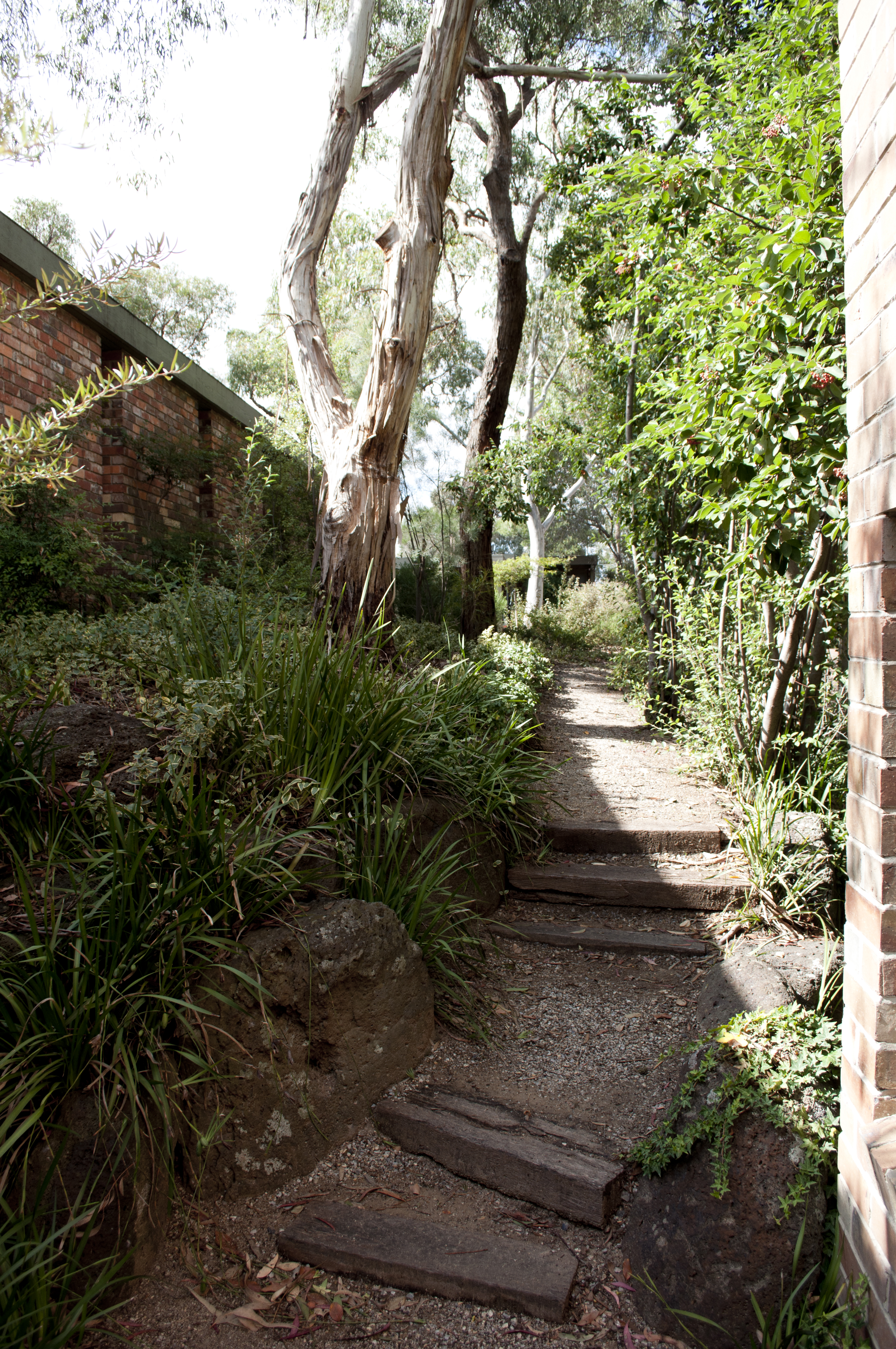
One of the walkways through Winter Park

== Design approach ==
=== Architect's intent ===
Winter Park is a carefully planned development in which groups of houses are sited to optimize available land in more efficient and environmentally sensitive method than that provided by the normal rectangular grid lot suburban subdivision. The project was built in two stages due to a capital cost and excess land was combined to provide communal open space. Houses are sited to relate with each other, to optimize privacy, solar orientation, views and physical conditions.

Winter Park consists of four groups of five houses located around communal car and pedestrian access ways. Each dwelling has a private garden in addition to a large central communal recreation space. The central idea was the free sitting of houses, private garden and communal open space to achieve an integration of the built environment within the most efficient use of land.

Ellis Stones was the landscape architect for Winter Park; it was his last major project. The original design was recreated by over-planting species that were not considered in Stones' intent.

=== Key influences ===
Half the site was retained as open space. The balance was oriented to parkland through loop roads with vacant blocks on the park side, so that the streetscape could flow without visual interruption into the park.

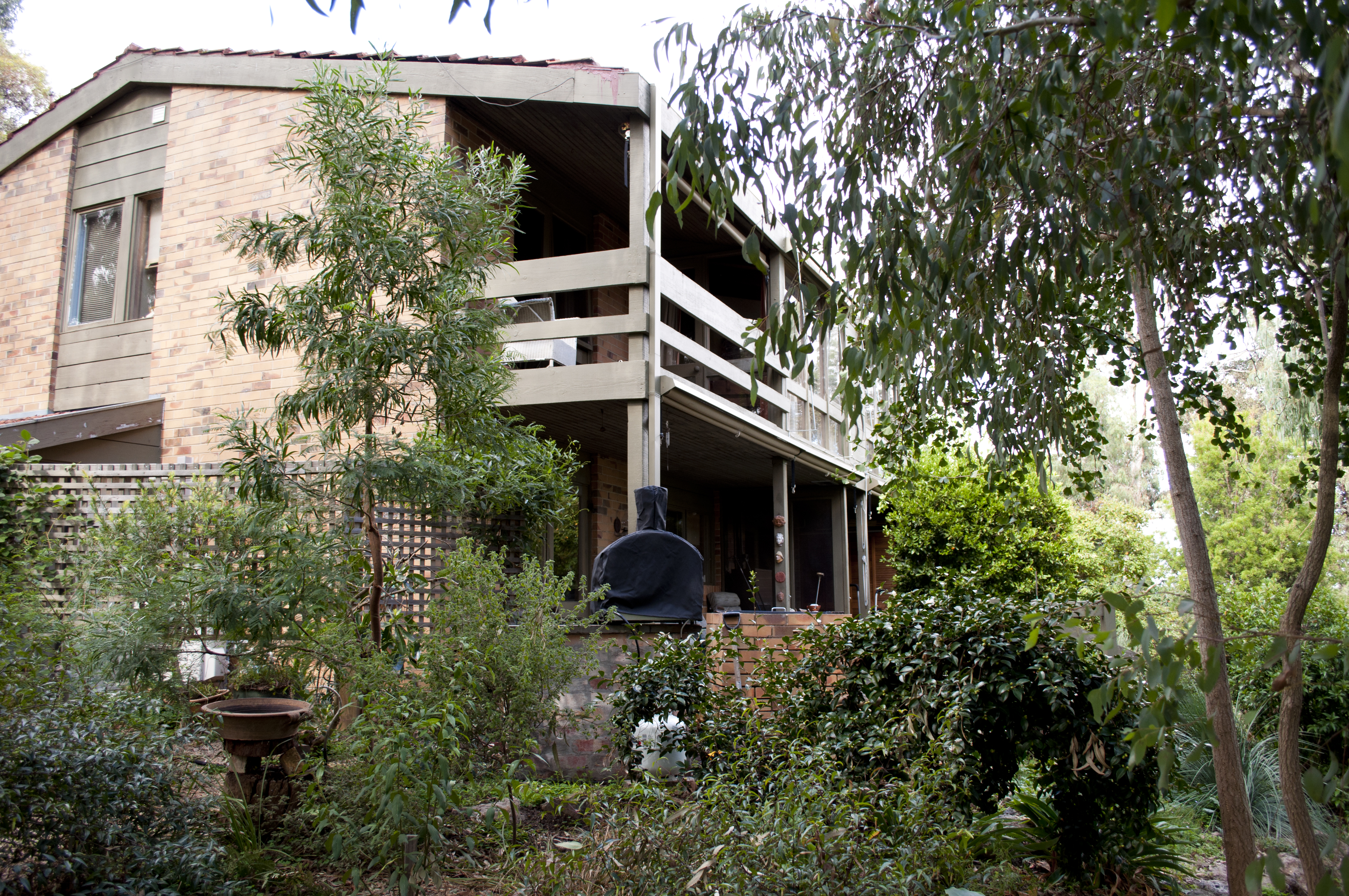
A double storey house of the twenty at Winter Park

== Historical significance ==
Winter Park was influential in encouraging the Victorian Government to introduce the Cluster Titles Act 1974, to control future cluster housing subdivisions and eventually to consolidate all subdivision legislation in a single act. In 1975 the Winter Park development received a citation in the Royal Australian Institute of Architects' Housing Awards. In addition, Graeme Gunn was presented with a prestigious 2011 Gold Medal. Awarded by the Institute in acknowledgment of his “trans-formative impact’ on housing, education and urbanism”. Winter Park is historically and socially important for its association with Merchant Builders Pty Ltd, one of the most influential building companies in Victoria in the post-war era. They encouraged the ideas of efficient energy and environment friendly architecture. Merchant builders designed project homes in Victoria. Some of the many innovative design principles and features they pursued included pergolas, exposed brickwork and timber beams, passive solar energy and the use of indigenous materials.

== Awards ==
Winter Park won an RAIA (Royal Australian Institute of Architects) citation in 1975.
