= Edward Yencken =

Edward Lowenstern Yencken (13 February 1854 – 7 September 1932) was an Australian hardware merchant. Yencken was born in Brixton, Surrey, England and died in Toorak, Melbourne, Victoria.
