= Artificial Australia =

Artificial Australia was the title of a series of lectures given by prominent Australian architect, Robin Boyd in 1967 on the Australian Broadcasting Commission.

The Boyer Lectures was a radio series that invited prominent Australians to present the results of their works and thinking on major social, scientific or cultural issues. The series started in 1959 under the title of the ABC Lectures, but in 1961 the ABC decided to rename it as a memorial to the late Sir Richard Boyer, chairman of the ABC, who was the person responsible for the creation of the original series.

== Background ==
Robin Boyd was an influential architect and educator whose design philosophy influenced the development of Australian architectural ideas. He was the "leading Australian propagandist for the International Modern Movement in architecture". He published nine books, with popular and controversial ideas on current tastes in architecture, design, and popular culture.

In the 1967 Boyer lectures on radio, Boyd discusses the state of architecture, design, and the cultural situation in Australia during that same period. Boyd provides an interpretation of Australia's architectural history, comparing local and global developments in an attempt to answer questions about the nature of architecture, design, work, and beauty.

== Content ==
Boyd's lecture series discuses a variety of topic and issues relating to Australia architecture and design as well as the prevailing cultural values of the time, focusing on the theory of ideas in relation to architecture, design and culture.

The title to the series, "Artificial Australia", refers to the everyday background of modern Australian life. It pertains to the design of things such as buildings, appliances, advertisements, cities, and landscapes.

=== Lecture 1 - Creative Man in a Frontier Society ===
Boyd begins the series by making a distinction in the kinds of people he thinks exist in Australia - with everyone being mixtures of 'doer' and 'dreamer' - the "practical man of action" and the "creative man of vision".

He uses the term progressive materialists to describe the man of action. That is, Australians "convinced that Australia at this stage of its development should still be concerned virtually exclusively with physical, economic, organizational and political problems"; with "no time for people with ideas" (p. 1)

The "creative man" he states, admits the physical problems but denies "the need for Australia to continue a life overbalanced on the materialist side’, and refuses ‘to believe in an infinite projection of economic security and physical comfort and spectator sports as the goal of living".

It is from this perspective that Boyd claims that the then current Australia was undergoing a social transmutation in which there had begun to exist an articulate intellectual opposition to the established Australian values that had been heretofore more reflective in principles of the man of action than vision (p. 2)

Boyd argues that Australia ought to focus more on the cultivation of ideas, and thus the encouragement of creative people. He uses Sweden and Switzerland and Canada as examples of smaller nations that can still be individual and creative, in spite of the mass-produced culture exported from the U.S. (p. 9).

=== Lecture 2 - The Architecture of Ideas ===
In the second lecture Boyd attempts to define the loose term "ideas" in relation to his own field of architecture and design. He does so by first introducing a number of important figures, principles and events in the history of architecture.

The Roman architect Vitruvius is the author of De architectura, known as The Ten Books on Architecture, in which he gave his definition for what architecture should be, firmitatis, utilitatis, venustatis – that is, stability, utility, beauty, laying the foundations for Vitruvian theory.

Boyd describes how Vitruvian theory proved useful through nearly 1900 years, through classical, Renaissance, Gothic and other Revivalist styles, until about 115 years ago. The industrial revolution, by introducing a change in the technique in the manufacturing of artificial products allowed, according to Boyd, a thing such as "vulgar design" to come into existence as industry made possible for mass reproduction, while also allowing for revolutionary building techniques (p. 13).

Boyd describes how present design ideas began to take form at that time - in the middle of the nineteenth century. Most importantly, the idea that everything made by man for his own use should be shaped according to its function without making concessions to ornamentation and frills.

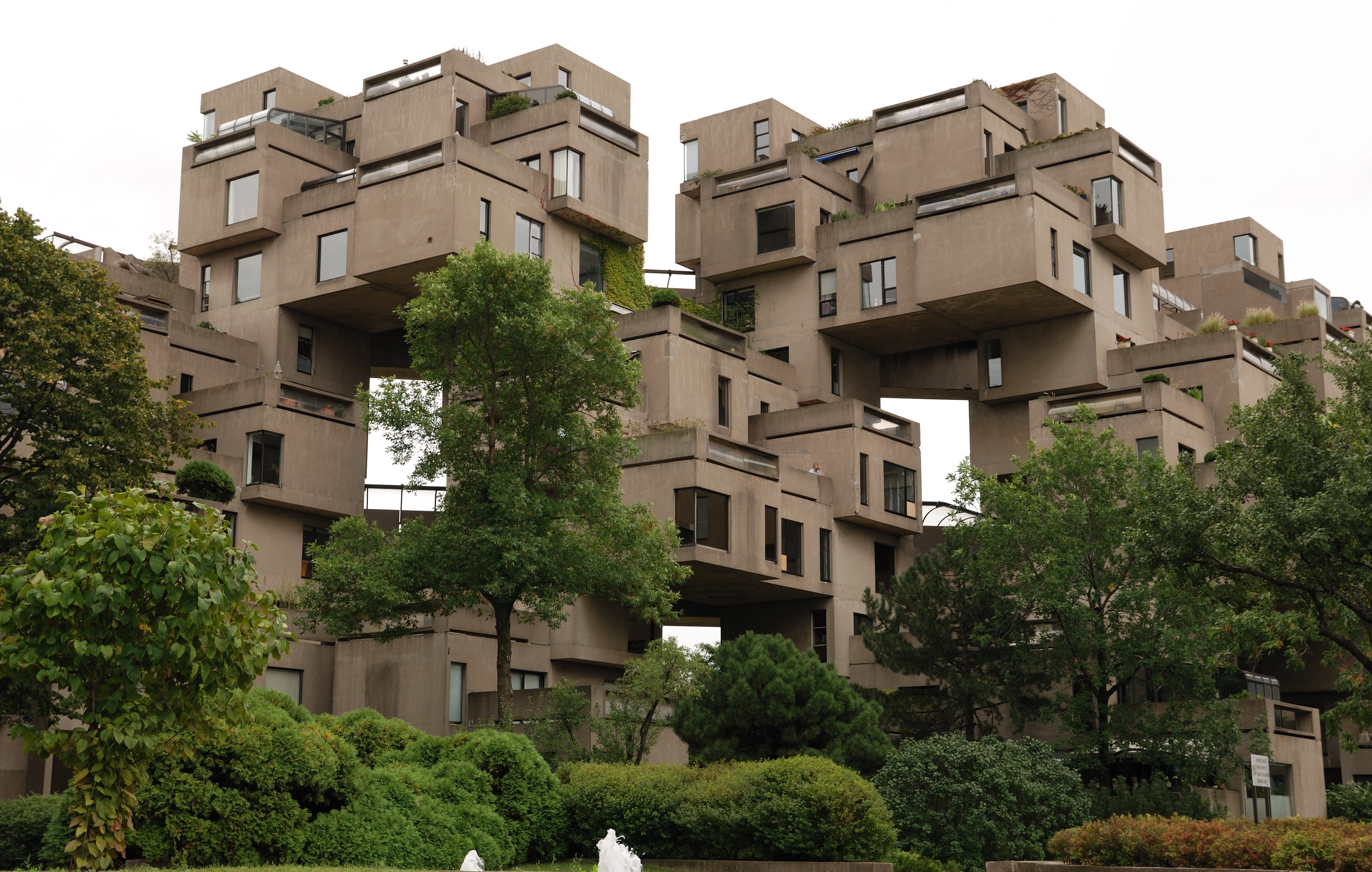
Montreal Habitat67

This concept came to be known as Functionalism and gained influence as the 19th turned into the 20th century. The primitive styled buildings it encouraged that discouraged ornamentation and embraced minimalism formed the basis for Modern Architecture which Boyd describes as having begun in Europe and built up in strength gradually.

Boyd briefly follows the changing popularity in the now internationalist Functionalist sentiment. Prior to the 1950 when it was popular for design to imitate machines in the spirit of pure geometry and sense of common purpose, during 1950 when Functionalism fell out of favor as forms began to be shaped with "no real motivation", and then in 1960 when Vitruvian principles were melded with the trappings of the Functionalist ethic as evidenced by such constructions as Habitat built at Montreal's Expo '67 which rejects basic principles such as symmetry but still maintains order (p. 20).

=== Lecture 3 - Integrity in the Artificial Object ===
In the third lecture, Boyd argues that the everyday background of modern-day Australian life is slowly becoming more artificial, a trend which he observes - to his alarm - is of importance to only a small number of Australians. He argues that this is due to the public perception of design as being a "frivolous subject", in opposition to Boyd's view of design being an index to the quality of a person's life (p. 22).

Boyd argues that this perception grew as the popularity of the Functionalist ethic lessened toward in middle of the twentieth century (p. 23). Following the Second World War, it was, Boyd says, a new wave of designers, and their eventual victory over the then Australian Conservative design philosophy - favoring "columns on the front of banks, and ornaments on marble mantelpieces, and paint everywhere, but in only two colors: cream and green" - that caused the degradation of the Functionalist philosophy because of the vacuous set of aesthetic objectives which such designers possessed (p. 27).

It was this historical development in the failure of Functionalism which Boyd presents as the cause of the then artificiality in design - "...In place of the old stodgy, conservative taste, we have now [...] a riot of violent colors and textures and dangerous shapes..." (p. 28).

Nonetheless, Boyd still thinks that the principle of design for function as a philosophy can be successful without the dullness or monotony he describes as forming what he terms the "Australian ugliness". This is only possible he says, when such a principle is applied with imagination and that every man made object should have its own "integrity" (p. 31).

=== Lecture 4 - The Environmental Arts in Australia ===
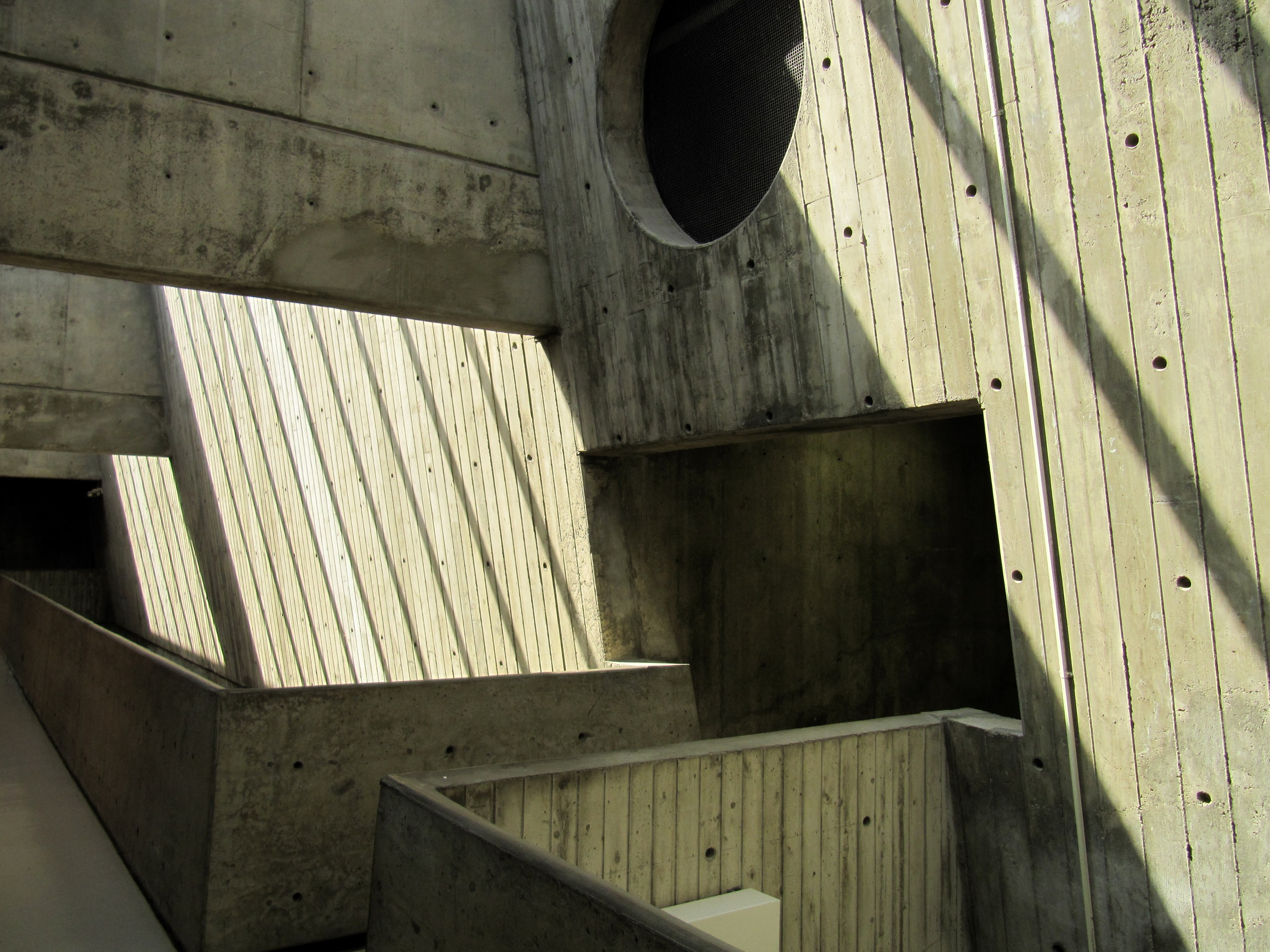
John Andrews Building Scarborough College

Boyd uses the fourth lecture to talk about ideas in Australia in the environmental arts, by which he refers to the state of creativity in such social activities as building, town planning, and urban redevelopment. He explains that though such activities form specialized disciplines, they are inter-meshed and not totally independent saying; "a town-planner cannot conceive a city without architecture", and "an architect's interests continually burst beyond the confines of the land he is building on" (p. 32).

Boyd is critical of what he views as the conservative state of affairs in Australian architecture. He attributes the cause of this state of affairs - not to individual architects, building owners or council members - but the general psychological climate of Australia at the time. "The truth is that this lucky land is no more inclined now to consider a revolutionary idea in building than it ever has been." (p. 42).

Even so, Boyd maintained that there was cause for optimism, saying that Australia does produce architects and architectural ideas in opposition to the "vegetable-like existence". He uses as an example for creativity the Australian architect John Andrews who designed the world-famous Scarborough College and would go on to become Australia's first internationally recognized architect (p. 43)

=== Lecture 5 - The Australian Myth in the Modern World ===
In the final lecture, Boyd seeks to characterize what he describes as the "elusive" Australian myth - the idea of Australia itself. Boyd examines Australia's broader cultural situation; how it views itself, how it cultivates local creativity, and how it values and promotes certain industries. He discusses how various Australian myths and legends are responsible for the current Australian psyche, and speaks in favor for the same intellectual class he described as having recently emerged in opposition to the Australian conservative position in the opening lecture. (p. 44)

Having argued throughout the series that Australia was lacking in encouragement for modern Australians who produce original ideas, Boyd starts the lecture by discounting the notion that Australians ought to be satisfied with an impoverished intellectual life when there exists healthily developing industries (p. 45). He justifies this view by saying the old Australian legend "...of independence, improvisation, self-reliance" is no longer a sustainable psychology in the conventional, technological age - a time in which such qualities are lost in favor for a reproduction of, and dependence on, the intellectual ideas of other nations (p. 47).

Ironically, Boyd suggests that emulation of Canadian strategies could provide a path to the kind of cultural creativity he thought the Australia of the time ought to aspire. For example, he references the 1949 Canadian Government appointed Royal Commission on the "Arts, Letters and Sciences" (p. 52).

== Reception ==
Boyd's unfavorable characterizations of Australian conservatism in the face of more progressive policies of similar nations such as Canada in his written works of 1967, may be argued to have been foundational works for the designers emerging in the following decades who might carry forward his brand of 'creative realism'.

Alternatively, Phillip Goad also identifies how figures such as a Geoffrey Searle and Winsome Callister have "noted Boyd's confused accounts of where Australian architecture might have been heading in 1967 and suggest these to be the result of disappointment in the local Melbourne scene, which, unlike Sydney, had not appeared to have developed its own regional idiom by the late 1960s.

Raisbeck and Phillips also note that while "Boyd's works and writings from 1960-1967 depict a relatively consistent commitment to a universal modernism", the extent of Boyd's commitment to Modernist Universalism changed over the course of the 1960s as his writings become less coherent and more fragmented.

== Legacy ==
Mauro Baracoco and Louise Wright observe that Boyd is described as a pioneer in showing how Australian architects might build in such a place where there is more "landscape than culture", "moving away from the discrete object towards buildings that knit in with their physical place.

The popularity of the lectures was large enough such that the ABC, uncharacteristically, republished Artificial Australia in 1969. Furthermore, in 2019, the centenary of Boyd was celebrated with a special issue of the RMIT Design Archives Journal entitled: Robin Boyd Redux.
