= Robin Boyd (architect) =

Australian architect and writer (1919–1971)

Robin Boyd CBE
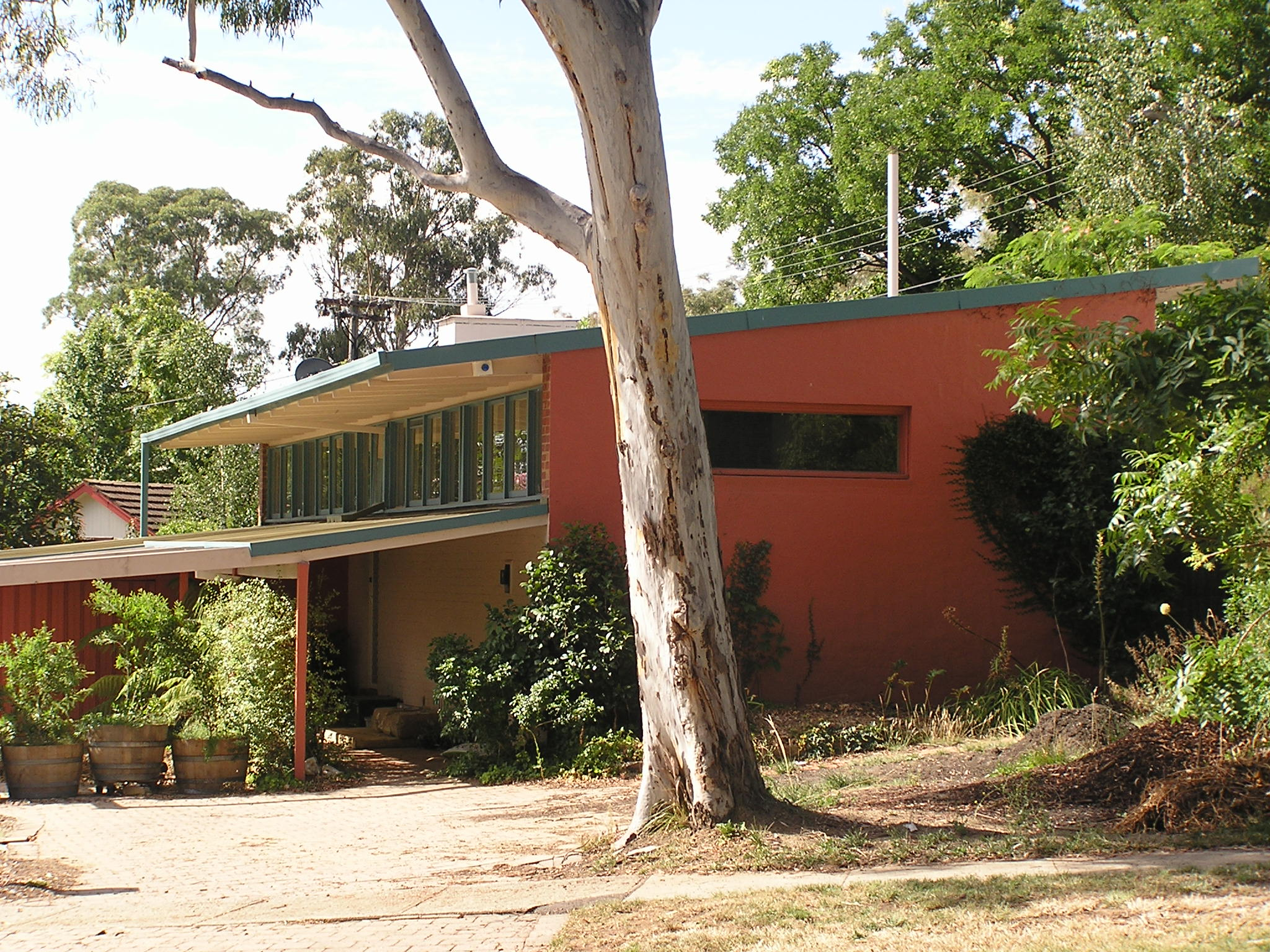
- Hilary Roche House (1954), Deakin, ACT
- Born: Robin Gerard Penleigh Boyd; 3 January 1919; Armadale, Melbourne, Victoria, Australia
- Died: 16 October 1971 (aged 52); Melbourne, Victoria, Australia
- Education: Melbourne Technical College; University of Melbourne Architectural Atelier
- Occupations: Architect, writer, critic, educator
- Spouse: Dorothea Patricia Madder (m. 1941)
- Children: 3
- Parents: Theodore Penleigh Boyd (father); Edith Susan Gerard Anderson (mother)
- Awards: Robert and Ada Haddon Travelling Scholarship (1947); Fulbright Scholarship (1956–1957); RAIA Gold Medal (1969); CBE (1971); AIA Architecture Critics' Medal (1973, posthumously); Sir Roy Grounds Award for Enduring Architecture 2022; Jack Cheesman Award for Enduring Architecture 2022
- Practice: A.& K. Henderson; Associated Architects—Boyd Pethebridge & Bell; Grounds, Romberg & Boyd; Romberg & Boyd
- Buildings: Boyd House II; Domain Park Flats; Baker House; Featherston House; Manning Clark House; Walkley House
- Design: Small Homes Service, Australia exhibits Expo 67 Montreal & Expo '70 Osaka
- Website: robinboyd.org.au

Robin Gerard Penleigh Boyd CBE (3 January 1919 – 16 October 1971) was an Australian architect, writer, teacher and social commentator. He was a prominent advocate of modern architecture in Australia and wrote extensively about architecture, design and Australian culture. His best-known book, The Australian Ugliness (1960), criticised what he characterised as the visual disorder and "featurism" of Australian suburbia.

Boyd's architectural practice focused primarily on residential design, and about one hundred houses were built from his designs. His other work included apartment buildings, motels, institutional buildings, and the internal spaces and exhibits for Australia's pavilions at Expo 67 in Montreal and Expo 70 in Osaka.

== Early life and education ==
Boyd was born in Armadale, Melbourne, the younger son of landscape painter Theodore Penleigh Boyd and painter Edith Susan Gerard Anderson. He was a member of the prominent Boyd family, whose members included the novelist Martin Boyd and the artists Arthur, David, and Guy Boyd. His maternal grandfather, John Gerard Anderson, was director of Queensland's Department of Public Instruction.

Until the age of three, Boyd lived at The Robins, a family house and studio at Warrandyte designed and built by his father. The family travelled to Europe in 1922; shortly after their return to Australia, Penleigh Boyd was killed in a motorcar accident in November 1923. Boyd attended Lloyd Street Central School and Malvern Grammar School. After completing his schooling, he studied architecture at night at Melbourne Technical College and the University of Melbourne Architectural Atelier while working during the day at A. & K. Henderson, where he was articled to Kingsley Henderson.

Boyd became an active figure within the Victorian Architectural Students' Society (VASS). He founded and edited its monthly newsfold, Smudges, deploying recurring "blot" and "bouquet" reviews to publicly criticise or commend contemporary buildings. In 1938, while still a student, he designed a timber-framed studio at the Boyd family's Open Country property in Murrumbeena for his cousin Arthur Boyd.

Following the outbreak of World War II, Boyd enlisted in the Citizens Military Force on 21 November 1939 and was mobilised in November 1941. He served with survey and cartographic units in Queensland, Papua, and Victoria before transferring to the Australian Imperial Force in 1943. He was discharged from service in September 1945 with the acting rank of warrant officer class 2.

== Architectural career ==
=== Early practice and Small Homes Service ===
After the war, Boyd practised with Kevin Pethebridge and Francis Bell in the partnership Associated Architects—Boyd Pethebridge & Bell. In 1946, he left the firm to become director of the Small Homes Service, an initiative established by the Royal Victorian Institute of Architects (RVIA) in conjunction with The Age. Opening in July 1947, the service sold inexpensive plans and specifications for architect-designed houses. Boyd also authored a weekly column for The Age on domestic architecture and design.

In 1947, Boyd completed his first family house at Camberwell, passed his architectural registration examination, and became an associate of the RVIA. That same year, he won the RVIA's Robert and Ada Haddon Travelling Scholarship, which enabled him to visit Britain and continental Europe in 1950. He remained director of the Small Homes Service until December 1953 while lecturing part-time at the University of Melbourne. During this period he published Victorian Modern (1947) and Australia's Home (1952).

=== Grounds, Romberg and Boyd ===
In July 1953, Boyd formed the Melbourne partnership Grounds, Romberg & Boyd with Roy Grounds and Frederick Romberg. The practice worked on houses, flats, factories, schools, churches and other commissions, developing what the Australian Dictionary of Biography describes as a distinctively Australian regional expression of the International Style. Romberg & Boyd was formed in 1962 after Grounds ceased practising with the other partners.

Boyd's major residential works included his second personal residence, Boyd House II in South Yarra, Baker House near Bacchus Marsh, and Featherston House in Ivanhoe. His larger works included Domain Park Flats, the Black Dolphin Motel at Merimbula, the John Batman Motor Inn, facilities at the Australian National University and La Trobe University, and Churchill House in Canberra. Photographs of Boyd's houses by Mark Strizic, Wolfgang Sievers and John Gollings featured prominently in the 2019 Heide Museum of Modern Art retrospective, Robin Boyd: Design Legend.

At Expo 67 in Montreal, government architect James Maccormick designed the Australian Pavilion, while Boyd designed its internal spaces and exhibits. Talking chairs positioned around the exhibits were designed by Grant and Mary Featherston. For Expo 70 in Osaka, Maccormick again designed the pavilion building, while Boyd was responsible for exhibits in the main pavilion, the Exhibition Hall, and the 61-metre, semi-subterranean "Space Tube", through which visitors travelled on moving walkways past audiovisual displays.

=== Writing, teaching and public advocacy ===
Alongside lecturing at the University of Melbourne, Boyd spent 1956–1957 in the United States as a Fulbright scholar and visiting professor at the Massachusetts Institute of Technology. During this period he was particularly influenced by Walter Gropius.

In The Australian Ugliness, Boyd identified 'Featurism' as a recurring characteristic of Australian visual culture, defining it as "the subordination of the essential whole and the accentuation of selected separate features". In 1967, he delivered the Boyer Lectures for the Australian Broadcasting Commission; they were published as Artificial Australia. His other published books included The Walls Around Us (1962), Kenzo Tange (1962), The New Architecture (1963), The Puzzle of Architecture (1965), New Directions in Japanese Architecture (1968) and Living in Australia (1970), co-authored with photographer Mark Strizic.

Proposals in the early 1960s to demolish The Capitol theatre in Melbourne sparked one of Australia's first major heritage conservation campaigns, which was co-led by Boyd, who called the Capitol 'the best cinema that was ever built or is ever likely to be built'. While the cinema was saved, its seating capacity was reduced and parts of the original ground level foyer were replaced by a shopping arcade.

== Recognition ==
Boyd was elected a fellow of the Royal Australian Institute of Architects (RAIA) in 1958, received the RAIA Gold Medal in 1969, and was elected a Life Fellow in 1970. He was elected an honorary fellow of the American Institute of Architects in 1960 and was also a fellow of the Royal Society of Arts.

Boyd was appointed a Commander of the Order of the British Empire (CBE) in the 1971 Birthday Honours for services to architecture and the Commonwealth government.

In 1972 in the year following his death, the Victoria Chapter of the RAIA initiated the Robin Boyd Environmental Award which awarded a wide range of awards for urban, environmental, community and social achievements in architecture and the built environment. The award ceased in 1981 when the national Robin Boyd Award for Residential Architecture, its national award for houses, was established.

In July 1973, two years after his death, the American Institute of Architects posthumously awarded him its Architecture Critics' Medal.

== Death and legacy ==
Boyd died of subacute bacterial endocarditis at the Royal Melbourne Hospital on 16 October 1971, aged 52. He was survived by his wife, a son, and two daughters.

The Robin Boyd Foundation was established with support from Boyd's family and the National Trust of Victoria. Former prime minister Gough Whitlam was its inaugural patron. The Foundation is based at Boyd House II in Walsh Street and promotes public awareness of design and architecture. The centenary of Boyd's birth in 2019 was marked by a dedicated issue of the RMIT Design Archives Journal, titled "Robin Boyd Redux".

When the Australian Institute of Architects commenced a national architecture awards program in 1981, it announced the Robin Boyd Award, as the highest Australian award for residential architecture (new houses).

== Selected projects ==
The following is a selected list of Boyd's architectural projects.

Project	Image	Date	Location	State or territory	Description	Notes
Arthur Boyd Studio		1938	Murrumbeena	Vic	An early commission, a timber-framed studio for Arthur Boyd, his cousin	
Robin Boyd House I		1947	664–666 Riversdale Road, Camberwell	Vic	Boyd's first family home; formerly numbered 158 Riversdale Road; added to the Victorian Heritage Register	
Wood House		1948	12–14 Tannock Street, Balwyn North	Vic	Designed for pharmacist Don Wood	
Dunstan House		1949–1950	17 Yandilla Street, Balwyn	Vic	Included in the Boroondara Heritage Overlay	
Gillison House		1952	43 Kireep Road, Balwyn	Vic		
Manning Clark House		1953	11 Tasmania Circle, Forrest	ACT	Designed for historian Manning Clark; recipient of the 2022 Sir Roy Grounds Award for Enduring Architecture	
Fenner House		1953–1954	8 Monaro Crescent, Red Hill	ACT	Recipient of the 1956 Canberra Medallion	
Hilary Roche House		1954	4 Bedford Street, Deakin	ACT	Designed for local doctor Hilary Roche	
Richardson House		1954	10 Blackfriars Close, Toorak	Vic	Extensively altered during the 1980s; included in the Heritage Overlay of the Stonnington Planning Scheme	
Igloo supermarket and residence		1954	1 Cleveland Road, Ashwood	Vic	Constructed using an experimental Ctesiphon concrete arch structural system; included in the Victorian Heritage Register	
Walkley House		1956	26–27 Palmer Place, North Adelaide	SA	Recipient of the 2022 Jack Cheesman Award for Enduring Architecture	
R. Haughton James House		1957	82 Molesworth Street, Kew	Vic	Included on the National Trust of Australia (Victoria) non-statutory heritage register	
Robin Boyd House II (Walsh Street)		1958	290 Walsh Street, South Yarra	Vic	Occupied by Boyd and his family from 1959; now the home of the Robin Boyd Foundation; recipient of both the Victorian and national Awards for Enduring Architecture in 2006; added to the Victorian Heritage Register	
Clemson House		1960	24 Milfay Avenue, Kew	Vic	Added to the Victorian Heritage Register	
Black Dolphin Motel		1961	Merimbula	NSW	Designed for a motel company led by David Yencken; construction occurred during 1960 and the motel was operating by early February 1961	
Holy Trinity Lutheran National Memorial Church		1961	22 Watson Street, Turner	ACT	Now used by the Finnish Lutheran Church; added to the ACT Heritage Register	
Domain Park Flats		1962	193 Domain Road, South Yarra	Vic	A 20-storey Modernist apartment building; recipient of the Victorian Chapter's Maggie Edmond Enduring Architecture Award in 2015	
John Batman Motor Inn		1962	69 Queens Road, Melbourne	Vic	Designed by Grounds, Romberg & Boyd, principally by Boyd; described in a Heritage Victoria survey as Melbourne's first motor inn	
Verge House		1964	204 Monaro Crescent, Red Hill	ACT		
Baker House		1966	305–307 Long Forest Road, Long Forest	Vic	Constructed around a central courtyard using locally-quarried stone	
Lawrence House and Flats		1966	13 Studley Avenue, Kew	Vic	Included on the National Trust of Australia (Victoria) non-statutory heritage register	
Lyons House		1967	733 Port Hacking Road, Dolans Bay	NSW	Commissioned by Dr Lyons	
Featherston House		1969	22 The Boulevard, Ivanhoe	Vic	Designed for industrial designers Grant and Mary Featherston	
Eltringham House		1971	12 Marawa Place, Aranda	ACT		
Churchill House		1972	218 Northbourne Avenue, Braddon	ACT	Designed as the national headquarters of the Winston Churchill Memorial Trust; following Boyd's death, completed by Bill Williams under the supervision of Neil Clerehan, who later designed the second storey that replaced the original glass display pavilion	

== See also ==
- Robin Boyd Award for Residential Architecture
- Boyd family
- Australian residential architectural styles
- Architecture of Australia
