= Clemson House, Kew =

Heritage-listed house in Melbourne, Victoria, Australia

Clemson House
- Location of the house in Greater Metropolitan Melbourne

General information
- Status: Completed
- Type: House
- Architectural style: International style
- Location: 24 Milfay Avenue, Kew, City of Boroondara, Melbourne, Victoria, Australia
- Coordinates: 37°48′18″S 145°01′09″E
- Year built: 1959–1960
- Completed: 1960; 66 years ago

Technical details
- Structural system: Scissor frames
- Material: Timber; metal roofing; fibro

Design and construction
- Architect: Robin Boyd
- Other designers: Ellis Stones (landscaping)

Victorian Heritage Register
- Official name: Clemson House
- Type: Registered place
- Designated: 14 November 2002
- Reference no.: VHR H2006
- Heritage overlay no.: HO251
- Category: Residential buildings (private)

Register of the National Estate
- Official name: Clemson House
- Type: Defunct register
- Designated: undated
- Reference no.: 103853

Clemson House is a house located at 24 Milfay Avenue in Kew, in the City of Boroondara, in the inner eastern suburbs of Melbourne, in Victoria, Australia.

The house was designed by Robin Boyd, an architect, architectural writer, educator, and commentator. Born in 1919, as a member of the Boyd family, he came from a creative family background of sculptors, painters, and architects.

Built between 1959 and 1960 on the traditional lands of the Wurundjeri people, the house was added to the Victorian Heritage Register on 14 November 2002 in recognition of its architectural significance; and was also added to non-statutory lists by the Victorian branch of the National Trust on 18 June 1990 and the now defunct Register of the National Estate on an unknown date.

== Description ==
The Clemson house was designed by Boyd in the International style for the Clemson family and built between 1959 and 1960.

The block slopes steeply to the west from the driveway off Milfay Avenue, with a minor creek flowing down the southern boundary. The landscape includes a large mature eucalyptus dating from well before the house, and informal planting and landscaping which give a bush block feel to the place. Ellis Stones built benching of large stones to stabilise the cutting to the north of the house, and flagstone steps and paving leading to the front entrance.

The main design feature of the house is the single sweep of steeply sloping metal-deck roof in a shallow inward sloping V which floats above and shelters the simple cabin shaped dwelling enclosures below. The roof is supported on a series of eleven white scissor frames of light section timber with square timber columns forming an open colonnade along the outside of the building. The top two bays off the driveway form a carport. Two cabin like living areas with dark painted vertical boarded walls and sloping fibro roofs step down the hill, one for bedrooms and bathroom and the other the kitchen and living area. They are separated by a breezeway with a translucent roof containing the entrance and laundry. Square timber framed windows are fitted to a uniform module of half a structural bay. The final bay under the roof is a deck which stands well above ground level and is surrounded by trees and is backed by the fully glazed wall of the living area.

The interior of the house is lined in natural finish hardwood boards with painted fibre-board ceilings. All rooms are comprehensively fitted with cleverly resolved built-in furniture, lighting and labour-saving appliances tailored to the Clemson's particular needs and adding to the liveability of what is actually a very small and economical dwelling. Detailing generally is simple but sophisticated.

== See also ==
- Architecture of Melbourne
- List of places on the Victorian Heritage Register in the City of Boroondara
