= Baker House (Bacchus Marsh) =

Heritage-listed house in Melbourne, Victoria, Australia

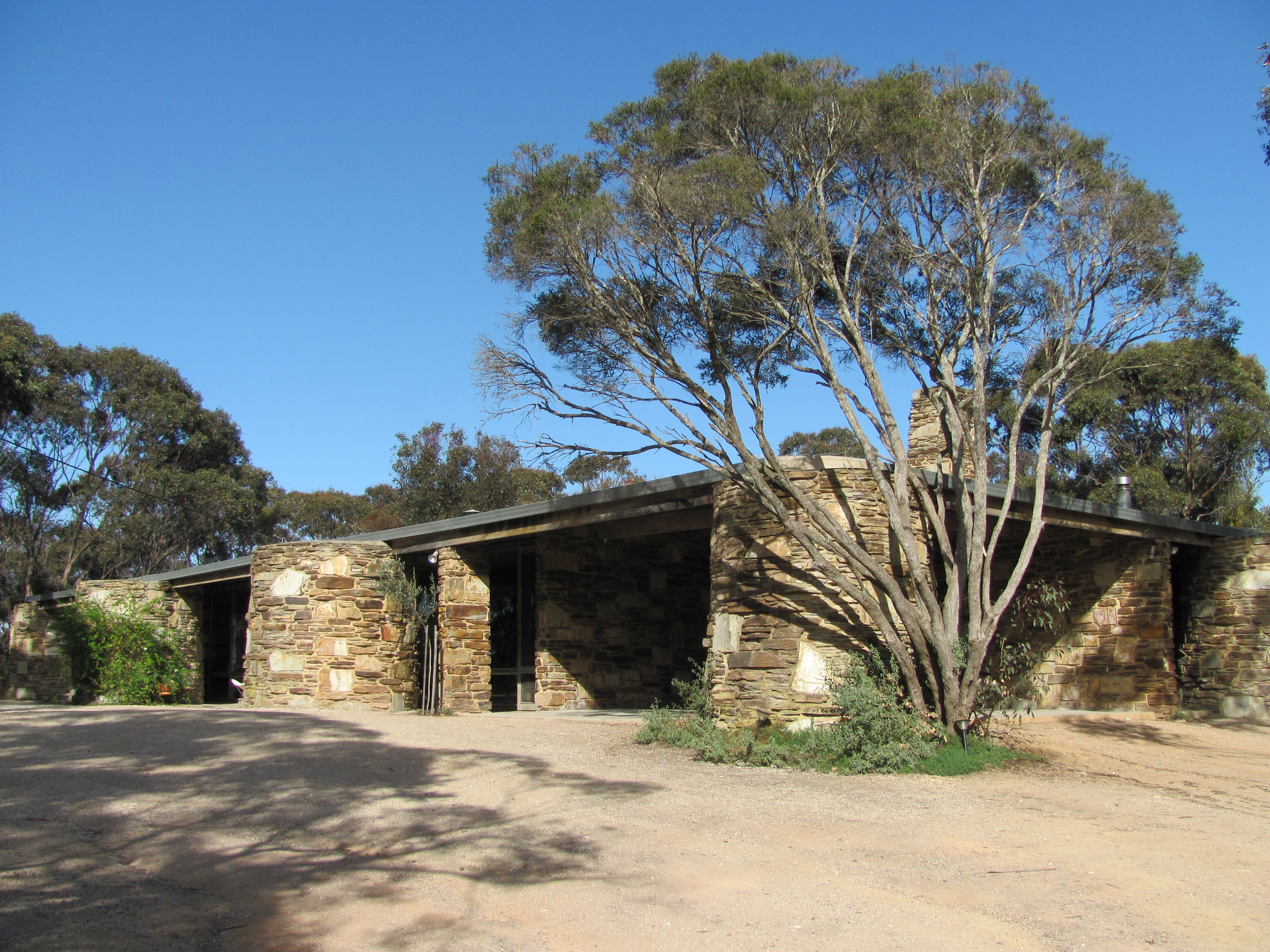
- Exterior of the house in 2012, showing the rounded cylinders made of stone
- Alternative names: Boyd Baker House

General information
- Status: Completed
- Type: Residence; Library / studio
- Architectural style: Modernist International
- Location: 305—307 Long Forest Road, Long Forest, near Bacchus Marsh, Melbourne, Victoria, Australia
- Coordinates: 37°39′13″S 144°30′03″E
- Year built: 1964–1966
- Completed: 1966; 60 years ago
- Renovated: 1968, 1970, 1979
- Client: Michael and Rosemary Baker

Technical details
- Material: Locally-quarried stone; straw; concrete; galvanised iron
- Floor area: 690 m^{2} (7,400 sq ft) (Baker House only)
- Grounds: 12 ha (30.88 acres)

Design and construction
- Architects: Robin Boyd (1964–1970); Roy Grounds (1979)

Website
- boydbakerhouse.com.au
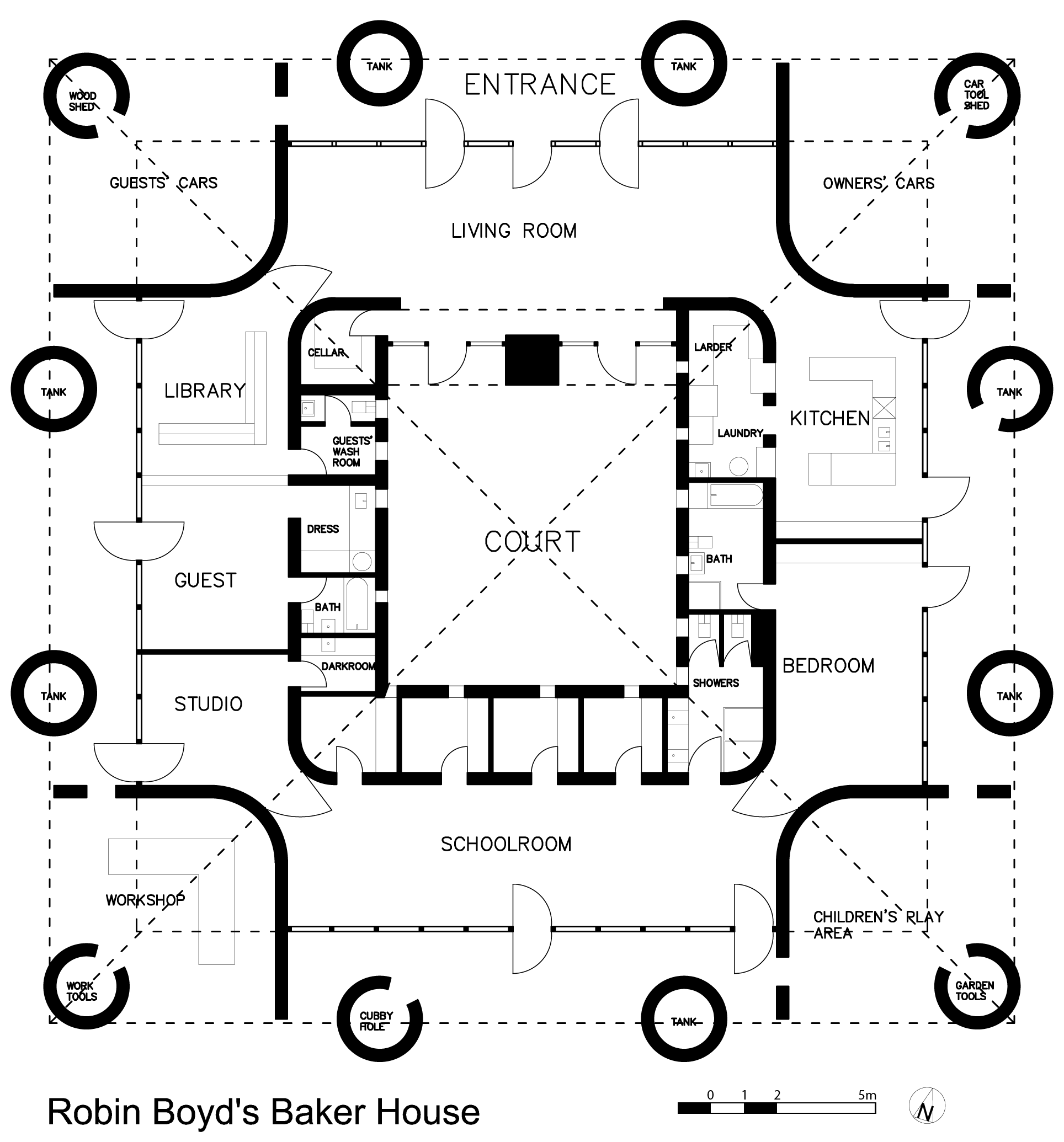
- Floor plan

- Location on the western outskirts of Greater Metropolitan Melbourne

Victorian Heritage Register
- Official name: Baker House
- Type: Registered place
- Designated: 10 May 2007
- Reference no.: H2118
- Heritage overlay no.: HO55
- Category: Residential buildings (private)

The Baker House, sometimes called the Boyd Baker House, is a house located in remnant bushland in the Bacchus Marsh area, on the western outskirts of Melbourne, in Victoria, Australia. The house, designed by Robin Boyd in the Modernist International style, was built in 1966 as a family home for Dr Michael Baker and Dr Rosemary Baker. The property was subsequently repurposed for use for private functions.

The house and two other buildings on the 14-hectare (35-acre) site were added to the Victorian Heritage Register on 10 May 2007 in recognition of their architectural significance, having remained relatively untouched since their construction.

== Description ==
Drs Rosemary and Michael Baker, both mathematicians came to Australia from England after Michael was appointed to the University of Melbourne at Point Cook as a mathematics lecturer. The Bakers acquired the 129-hectare (0.5 sq mi) site for approximately A$4,000. Michael Baker recalled,

"I constructed the perpendicular bisector between [the] university and Point Cook, measured off the maximum commuting distance, and traveled out. Long Forest, near Bacchus Marsh, was the first bit of bush I came to."

Boyd was given a relatively-loose instructions by the Bakers who wanted as much space as possible and did not have any specifications on materials or character. Boyd was influenced by Dr Baker's affection for geometric calculations, that led to a regimented and formal architectural expression; and came up with two schematics—two long symmetrical cylinders and a courtyard plan. The latter was built, commenced in 1964.

Made of locally-quarried stone, the 760-square-metre (8,200 sq ft) house is square in plan, surrounded by twelve stone cylinders topped by a shallow pyramid roof, while at the centre lies a large 70-square-metre (750 sq ft) courtyard beneath a flywire roof. Due to its remote location, the site was not connected to water or electricity. The design incorporated the collection and storage of rainwater via several of the stone cylinders as house water tanks. The house also featured a large school-room for the owners' four home-schooled children.

Internally, the private functions and services of the house line the walls with small windows onto the courtyard, leaving large open-plan spaces along the perimeter of the building. The perimeter walls are fully glazed, opening onto deep verandas that allowed for circulation inside the house. The main living space was originally heated by a large fireplace, however this proved to be ineffective, and several extra wood burning heaters were subsequently installed throughout the house.

=== Key influences and design approach ===
Boyd put much effort into considering the unique conditions of Australia and subsequently developed a style "related to Australian materials and conditions, to [the] light and its connection to Australian landscape". References to the work of Walter Burley Griffin were evident with large living spaces or courtyards that became the centre of the house. The influence of Louis Kahn was also evident in the floor plan, where Boyd created a sense of formality in the layout through the use of a perfect square. The use of such geometry also reflects Dr Baker's profession as a mathematician and was described as "a plan of noughts and crosses".

Concrete was the planned construction material; however, the house instead utsed locally-quarried stone, adding to the rustic qualities of the house, drawing on Colonial influences in the design. Boyd described the process as "like designing a house for Robinson Crusoe." At the time of construction there was a large emphasis on the texture, warmth, and weathering of materials, influencing the use of stone both externally and internally, the straw ceilings, and the bare concrete floors. These tough and low maintenance materials reflect the conditions of the surrounding Australian bushland.

=== Contemporary use ===
Used initially as the Baker family's private residence, the house was subsequently used for private functions. The house and adjoining structures were sold in 2006 for more than A$1.11 million, and sold again (Note: It would appear that, in 2024, Baker House, Downer House, and the Library were all sold in one lot. However, with price expectations of more than A$3.1 million for all three structures, the listed sale price of A$1.5 million may relate to Baker House only.) in 2024 for approximately A$1.5 million.

== Dower House and Library ==
After its completion in 1966, another house was commissioned for the owner’s mother-in-law, originally known as the Elizabeth Strickland house, and commonly called the Boyd Downer House. Using the same local stone, Boyd designed a smaller house again with a square plan, although instead of the rigid geometry of the Baker House, the Dower House features a freeform stone wall running throughout.

In 1979, the owners commissioned Sir Roy Grounds, Boyd’s former partner, to design a small library on the site. His design complements those of Boyd through use of similar materials whilst contrasting with the formal style of the two houses. The design of the library / studio enabled it to be used without electricity; although it was connected sometime after 2006.

== Gallery ==
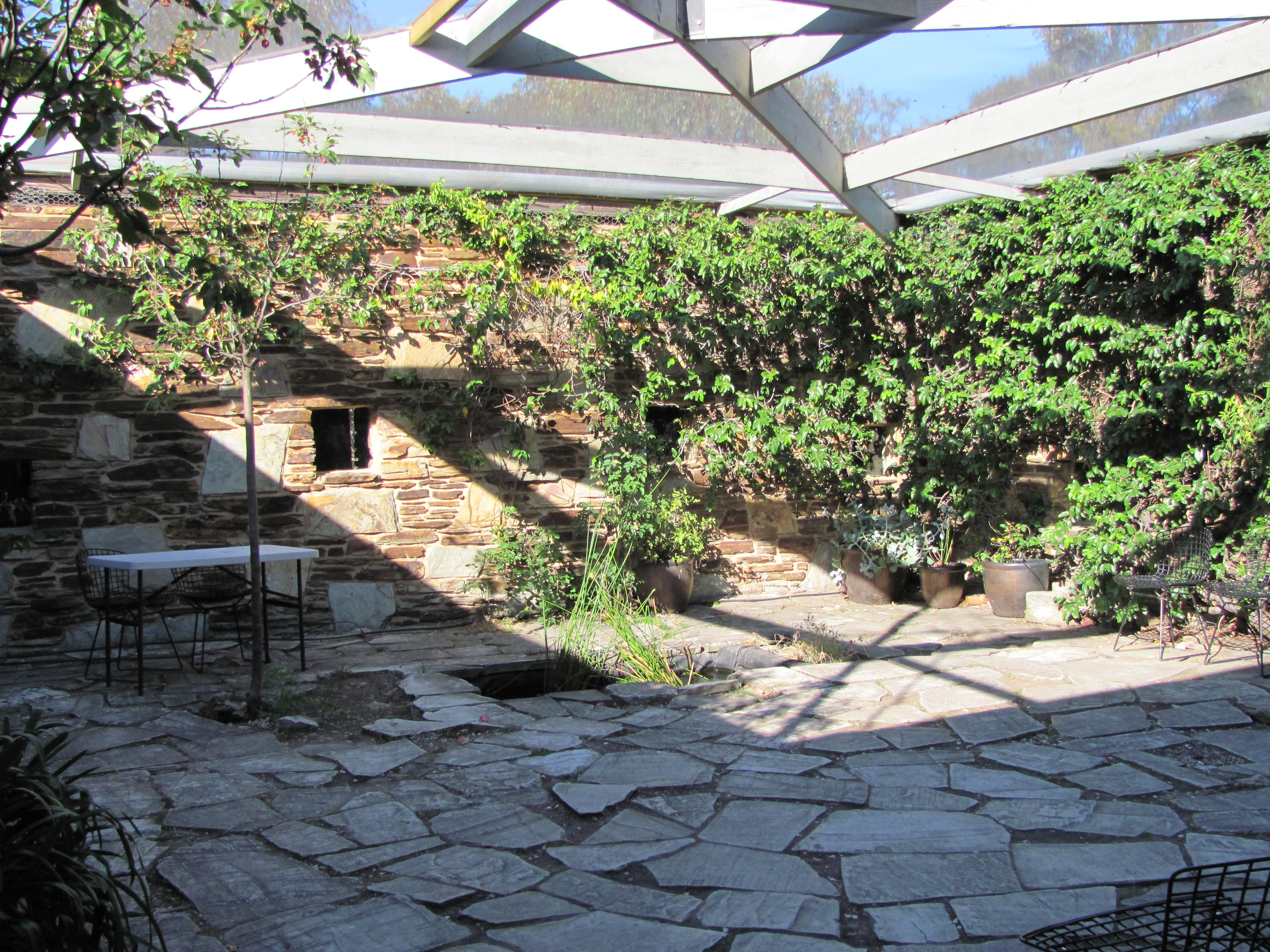
View of the internal courtyard

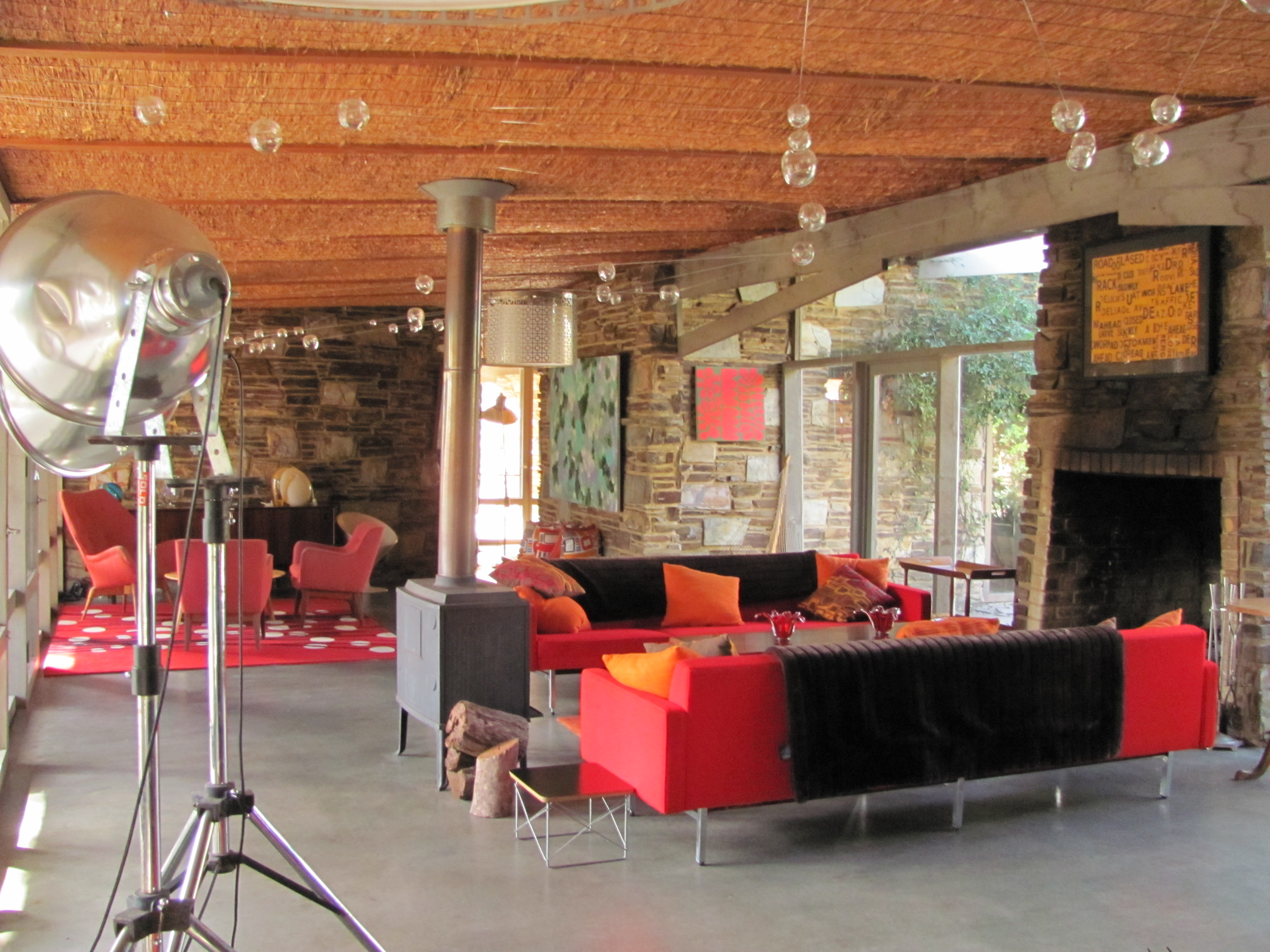
One of the open living areas

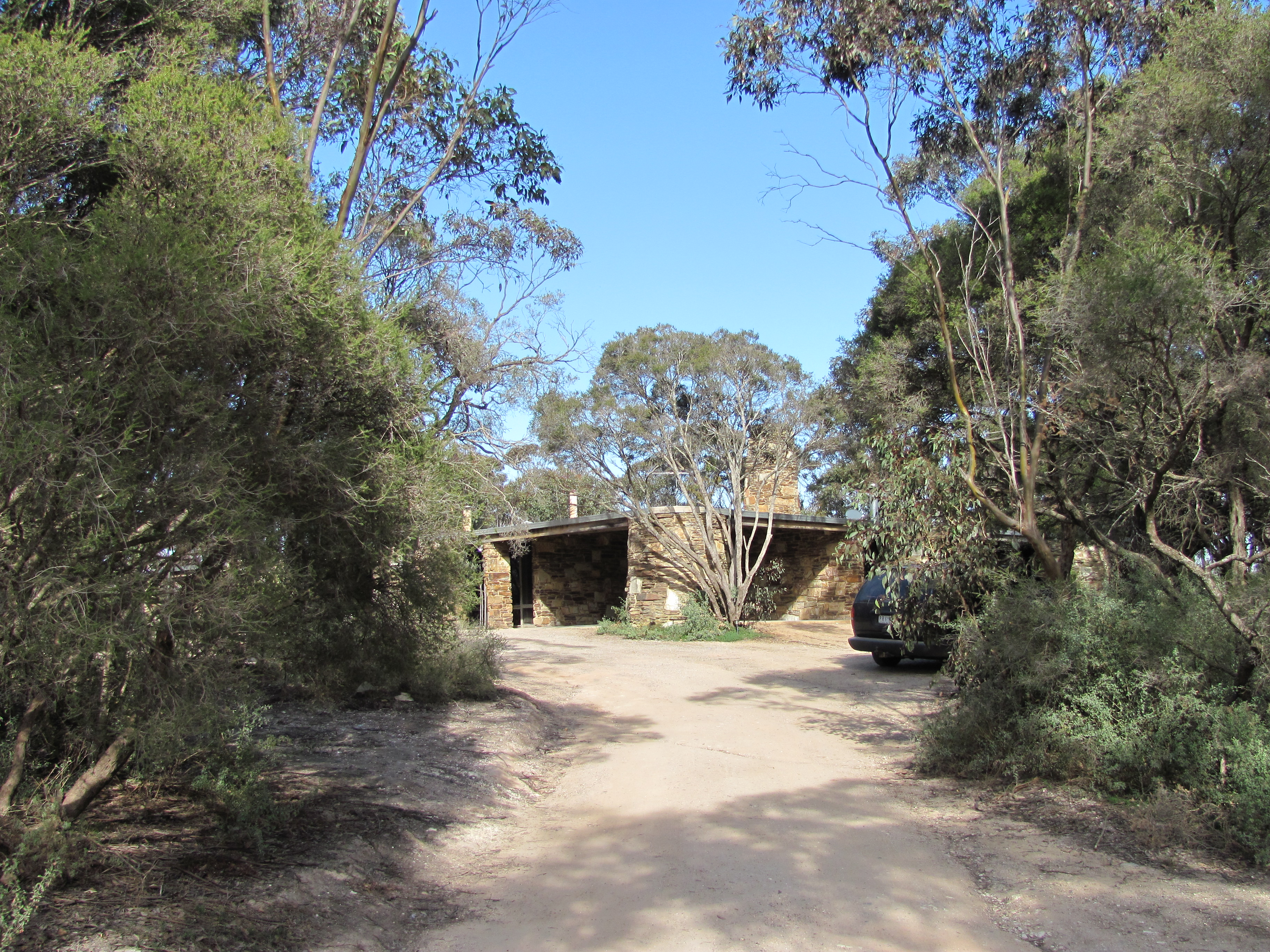
Bushland surrounding the house

== See also ==
- Architecture of Melbourne
- Australian residential architectural styles
