= Walsh Street House =

Heritage-listed house in Melbourne, Victoria, Australia

Boyd House II
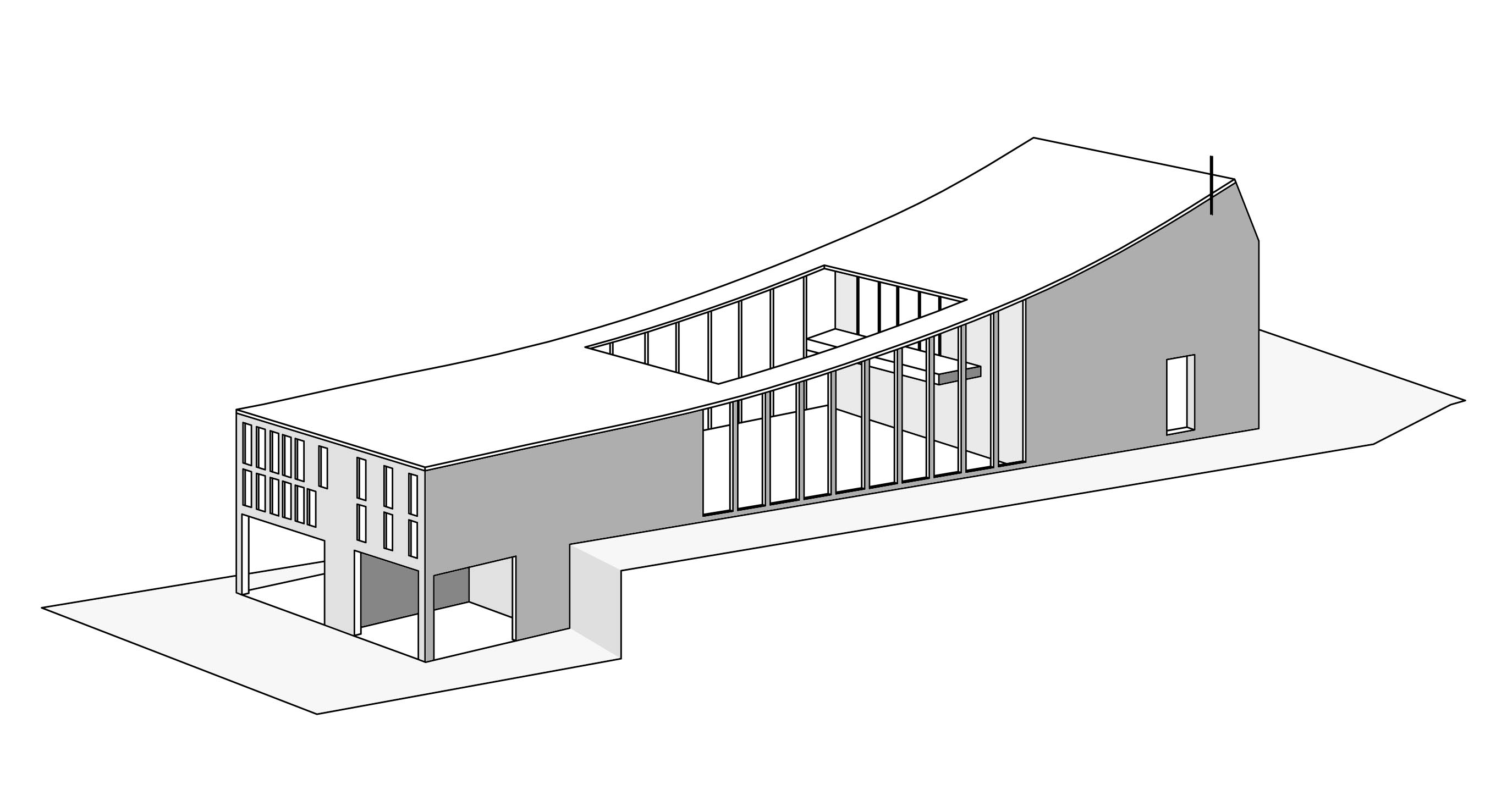
- A drawing of the Walsh Street House depicting the two components of the home, separated by the internal courtyard

- Location within Melbourne

General information
- Status: Completed
- Type: House
- Architectural style: International style
- Location: 290 Walsh Street, South Yarra, City of Melbourne, Victoria, Australia
- Coordinates: 37°49′53″S 144°59′11″E
- Completed: 1958; 68 years ago

Design and construction
- Architect: Robin Boyd
- Awards: National Award for Enduring Architecture (2006); Maggie Edmond Enduring Architecture Award (2006)

Website
- robinboyd.org.au

Victorian Heritage Register
- Official name: Robin Boyd House II
- Type: Registered place; Registered object integral to a registered place
- Designated: 15 March 2007
- Reference no.: VHR H2105
- Heritage overlay no.: HO453
- Category: Residential buildings (private)

The Walsh Street House, also known as the Boyd House II and Robin Boyd House II, is a family home in Walsh Street, South Yarra, Melbourne, Victoria, Australia, designed by Robin Boyd in 1958, which the Boyds moved into a year later. Robin Boyd was known not only as an architect but also an architectural writer, educator and commentator. Born in 1919, as a member of the Boyd family, he came from a creative family background of sculptors, painters and architects. He and his wife Patricia occupied the South Yarra home with their two daughters.

The house was added to the Victorian Heritage Register on 15 March 2007 in recognition of its historical and architectural significance; and was also added to a non-statutory list by the Victorian branch of the National Trust on 27 September 2004.

== Historical and cultural significance ==
The Boyd House II is acknowledged as one of Boyd's most prestigious houses. Boyd wanted to create a "private indoor-outdoor environment despite the narrowness of the allotment and the congested surroundings of the inner suburb." "It is significant as a material expression of Boyd's architectural ideas and writings, which were known internationally at the time." It also stood out as architecture based on a strong structural-functional design, therefore the structure and function of the home in relation to society. Like Walsh Street, the allotment was on an incline. Originally, the allotment was part of a much larger plot of land and the Walsh Street house sits today on what was once a small side garden. The plan of the house was designed so that most views orient inwards, to the internal courtyard. Due to this introverted plan, views from the street into the house are limited. A large Monterey pine (Pinus radiata) is located at the front of the house and Boyd designed around the large tree to preserve it.

== Influences ==
House II was the second Boyd home and the design was inspired by overseas architectural styles. Boyd was fond of International architecture, in particular the functionalist manner. When living in his first family home situated in Camberwell, he considered open plan living, and the idea of allocated areas for the adults and children in the one home. Boyd was also influenced by the "structural optimism of the Spanish engineer, Eduardo Torroja". This optimism was matched by an ambitious proposition by Robin Boyd that considered how one could conceive the idea of dwelling in the Boyd house.

Functionalism design strongly influenced the appearance of the house at Walsh Street. Boyd deeply considered the choice of material, structure and details. Furthermore, prior to the construction of the house he wrote "he [the architect] will interpret his own design in every furnishing and fitting, in the position of every ashtray, in where he leaves the evening paper, in how he sleeps in where and how he and his family eat."

Boyd's willingness to move between different tectonic vocabularies of structure and enclosure differed him from his colleagues where a single idea dominated the design and the house was transformed. In this case it was an innovative idea of a draped roof slung over cables sheltering a house split into zones by an internal courtyard.

== Awards ==
Before the Walsh Street Home became the chosen location for the Robin Boyd Foundation, it was an icon for Australian architecture of the Twentieth Century. It was also recognised internationally and is found in such journals as Japan Interior Design in 1962, Architectural Review, London in 1960 and 1963 and J M Richard's New Buildings in the Commonwealth, London 1961.

In 2006, the house was awarded the Royal Australian Institute of Architects (RAIA) Victorian 25-Year Award and the RAIA National 25-Year Award.

== Description ==
In 1947, Boyd wrote "In his [the architects] own home all his philosophy of building must surely blossom…" Consequently, he tailored his Walsh Street home to suit the needs of himself and his family. The house is physically divided into zones, one for the adults and one for the children. The adults wing is located at the front of the home and the children's is at the back, where there is also vehicular access.

In elevation, the brick façade is made up of two storeys with a strip of windows located high above the front door to prevent anyone seeing into the home, so the house cannot be understood from the street. A flight of splayed stairs from ground level leads to the first floor containing the formal living area, master bedroom, Boyd's study and bathroom. Stairs down to ground floor are situated inside the master bedroom, where furniture has been positioned to take on the role of the balustrading. On the ground floor is the less formal family, dining and kitchen space – as well as access to the courtyard. Located across from the courtyard are the children's quarters. The internal courtyard has surrounding glazed walls, which protect it from wind and rain but not light – they also allow for a visual connection between the separate buildings. Corridors along the sides of the courtyard provide access for the children to their quarters which contain three bedrooms (one with a study) and a bathroom. There is a lane situated behind the children's quarters, used as a carport.

A sloping roof starting from the top of the double storey block, drapes down to the single storey children's block. The roof is held up by single cables tied to steel framing and placed at equal distances by timber members. The creation of the roof involved built-up felt layered on timber decking and an aperture over the internal courtyard was constructed for direct sunlight into the courtyard. Cavity brick construction created the side walls of the property, which were painted in natural earth-like tones. On the interior, the brick walls were clad with jarrah lined timber and the joinery has been made from limed-mountain ash.

Since completion of the house, during the 1970s to 1980s, the bathroom in the children's quarters underwent a renovation by architect, Guilford Bell.

== Gallery ==
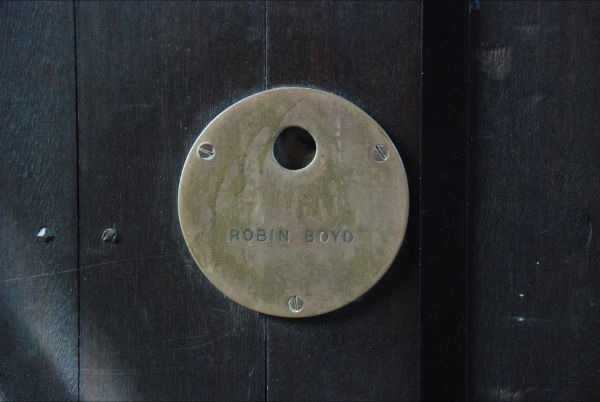
A plate fixed to the front door of the house stating Boyd's name

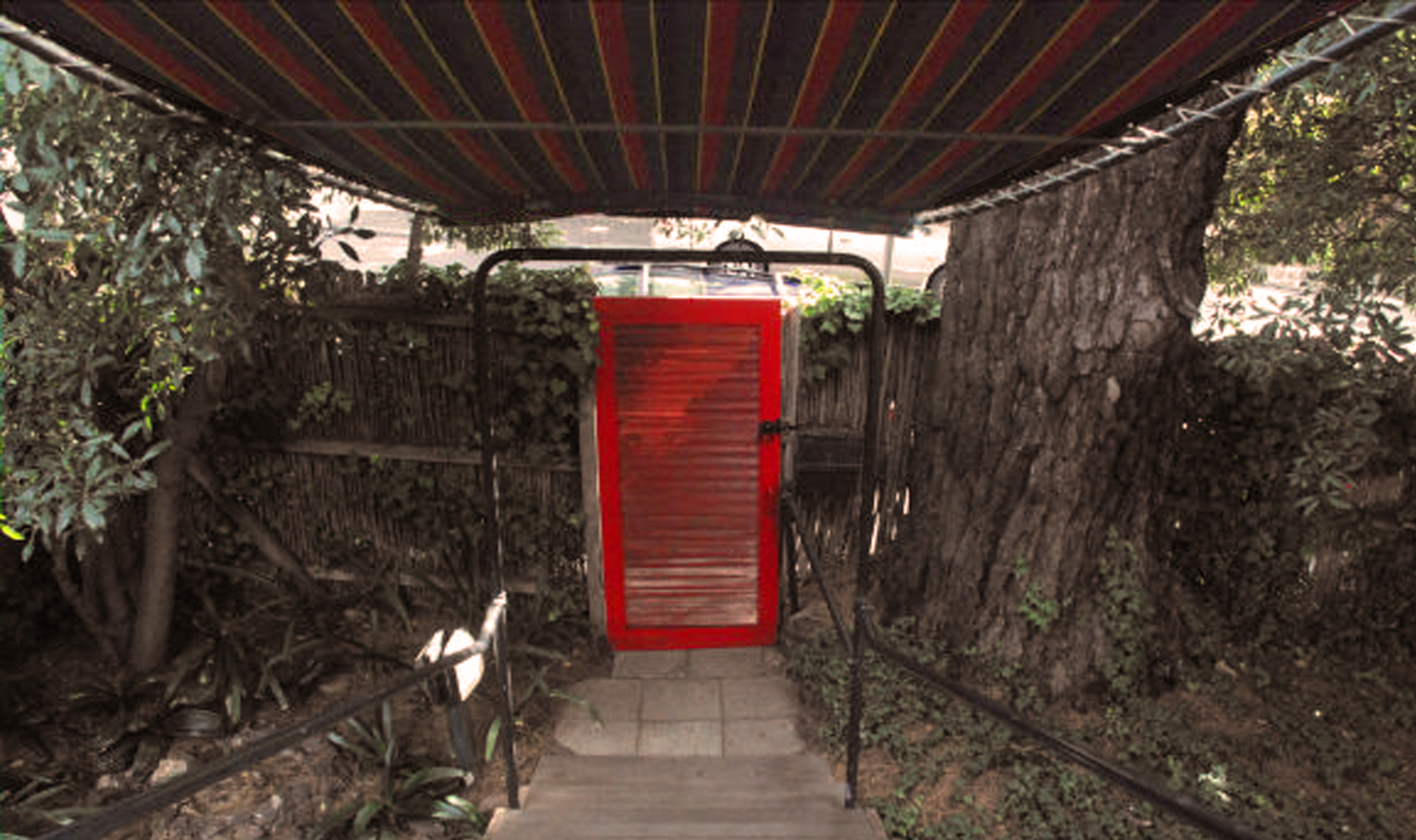
The gate at street level, situated at the bottom of a flight of splayed stairs leading from first floor

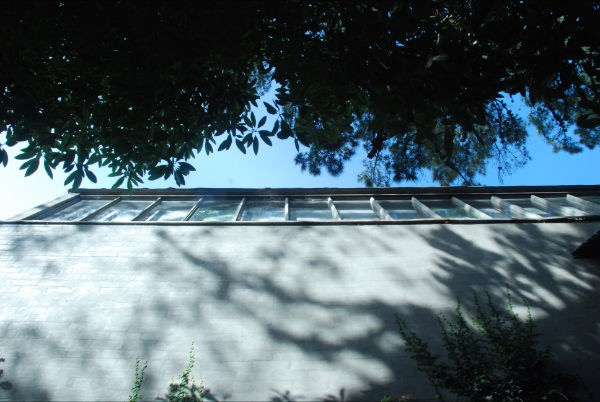
On the left half of the facade, no windows are eye height

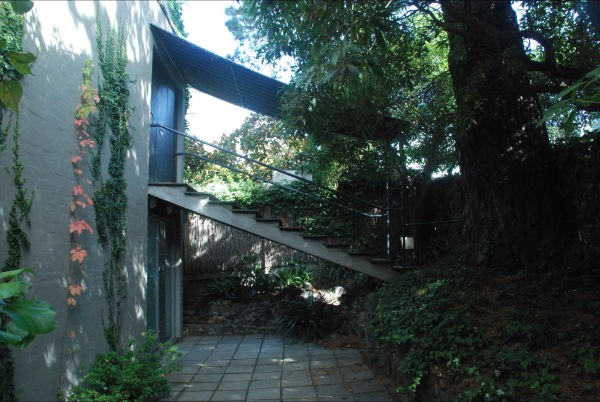
The entrance; the staircase leads from street level to the first floor

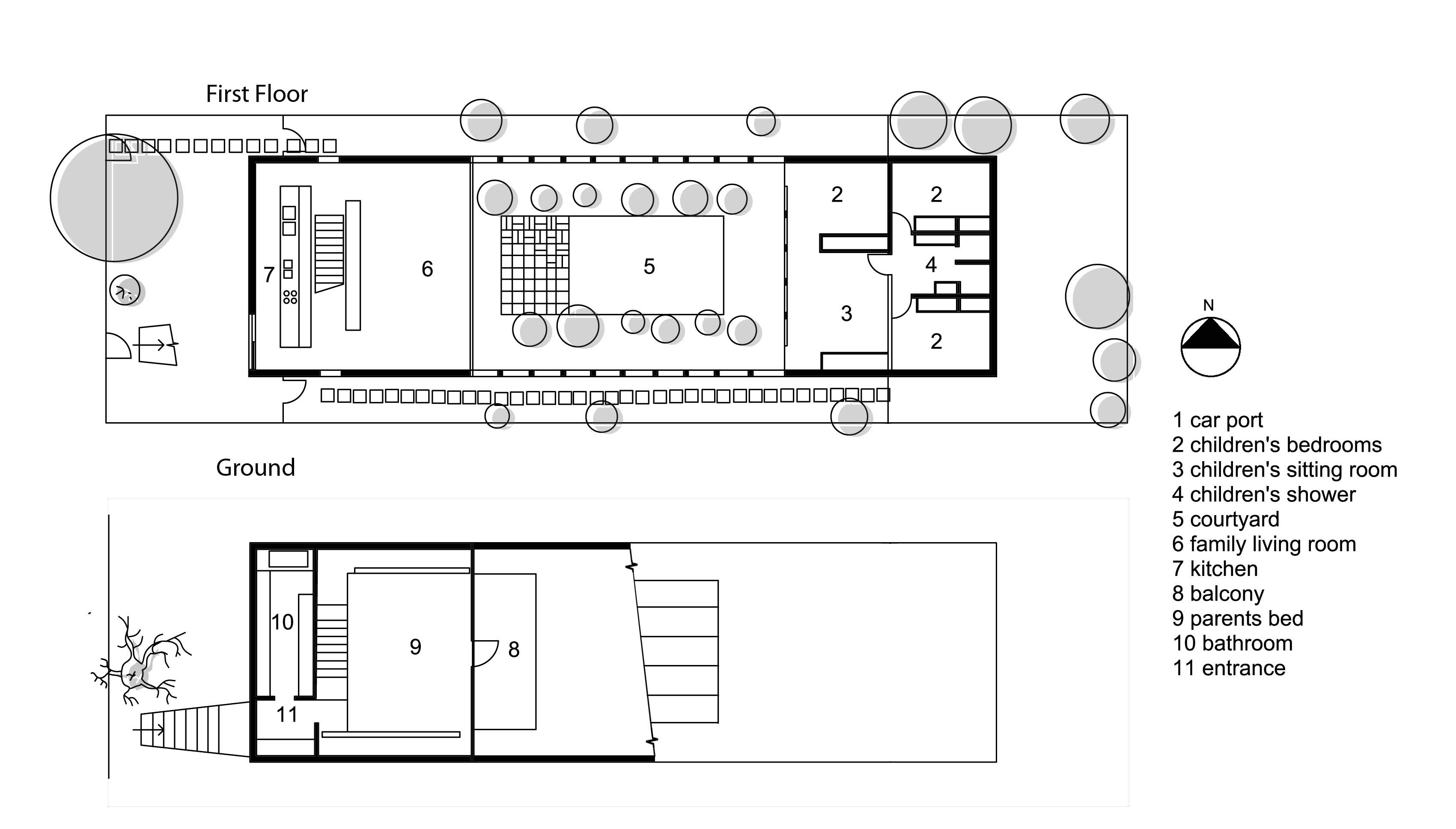
Ground and first floor plans of the house

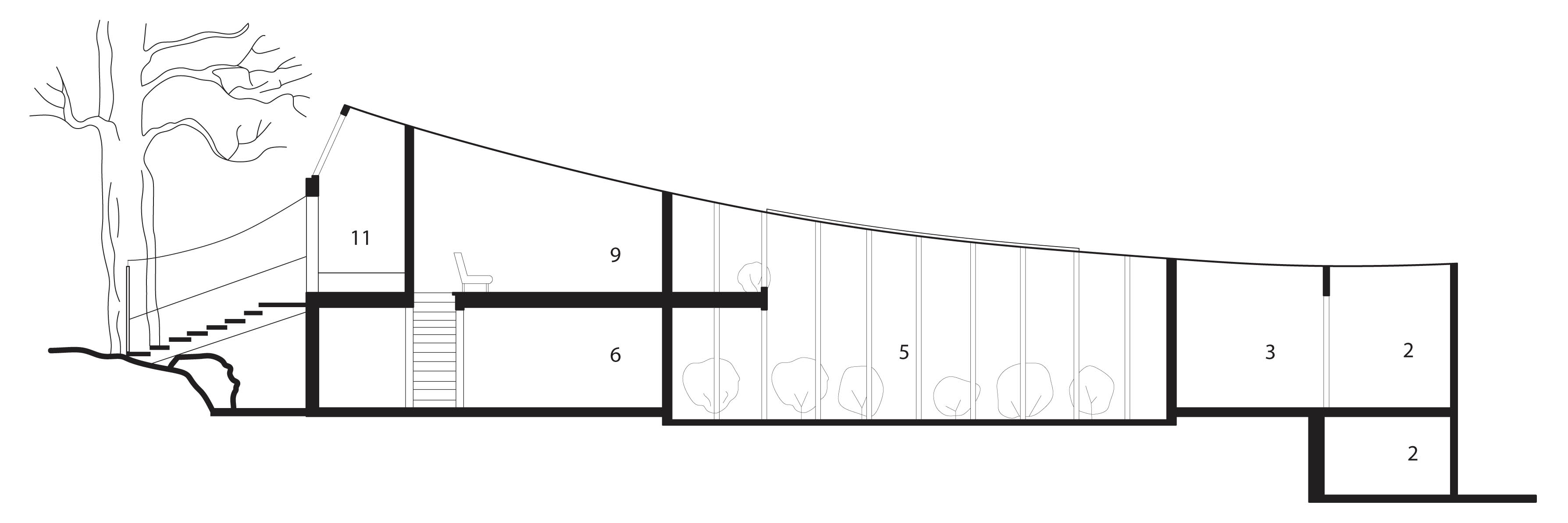
A section through thehouse

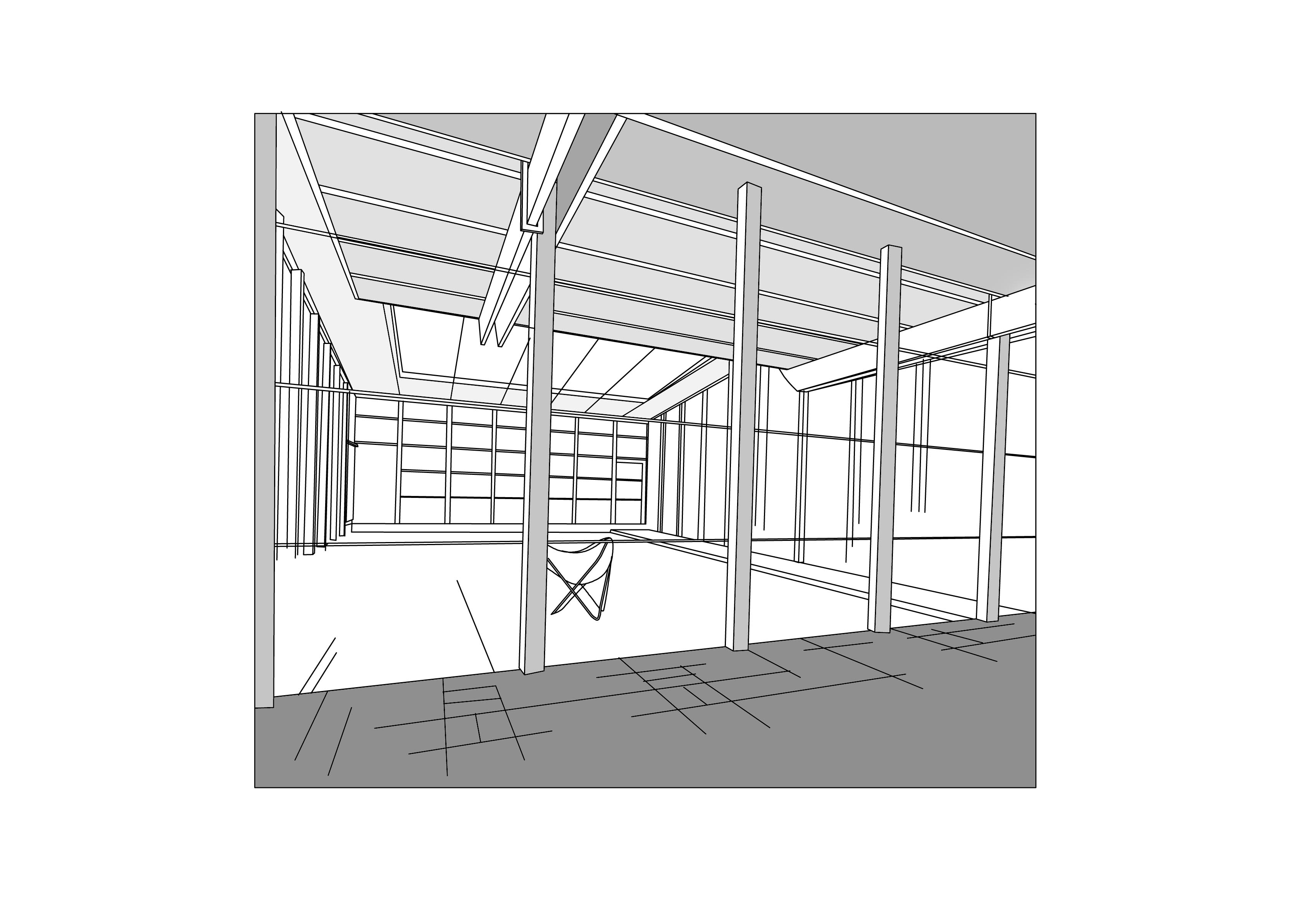
A digital drawing of the view across the courtyard

== See also ==
- Architecture of Melbourne
- Australian residential architectural styles
- Robin Boyd House I
