= Featherston House =

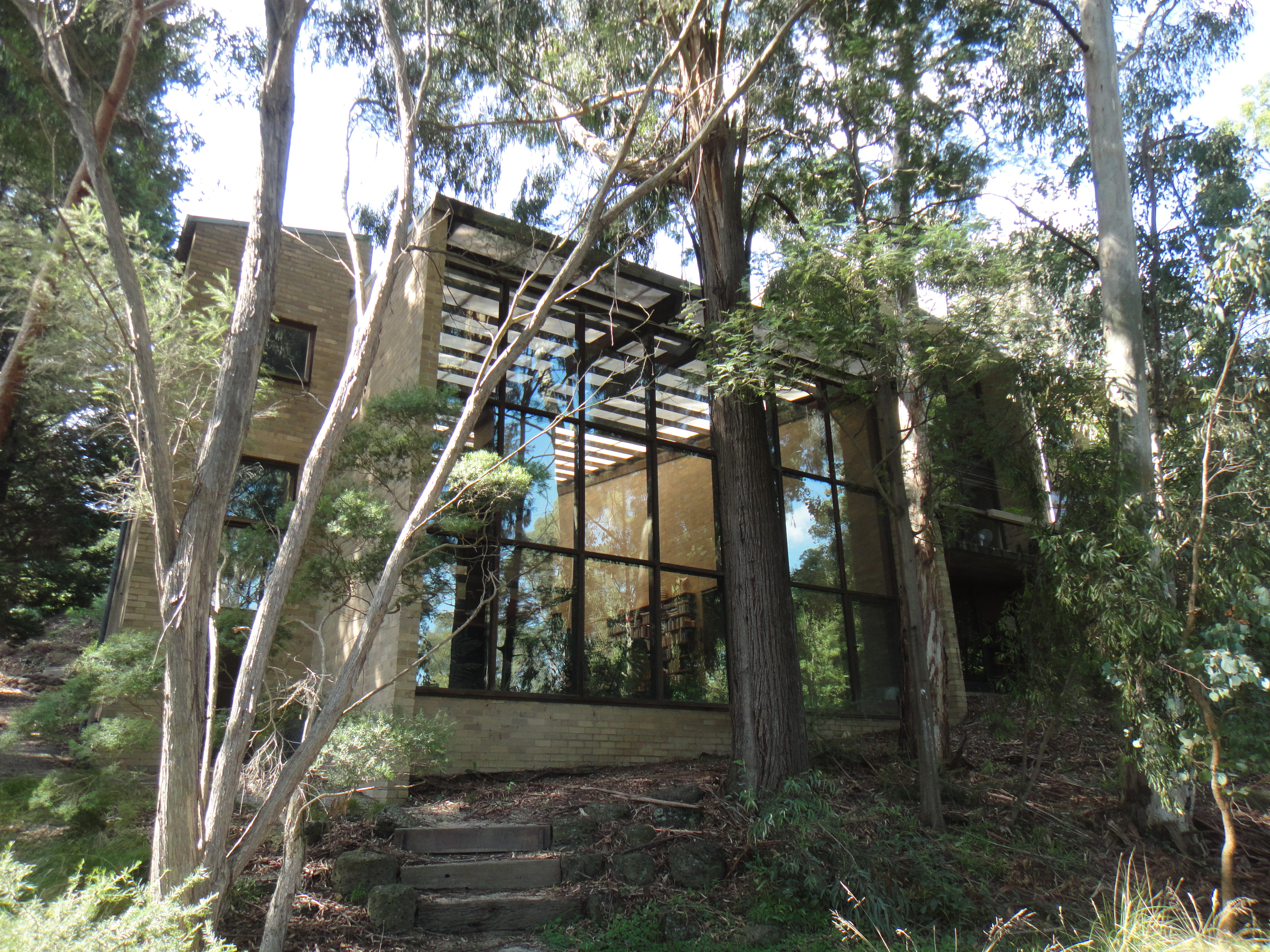
- Panoramic view of the entire house

General information
- Type: House
- Architectural style: Australia’s domestic buildings (loft and warehouse style)
- Location: Melbourne, Victoria, Australia
- Current tenants: Featherston family
- Construction started: 1967
- Completed: 1969

Design and construction
- Architect: Robin Boyd

Featherston House is in Ivanhoe, Victoria. It was designed by leading Australian architect Robin Boyd of Romberg & Boyd in 1967. The house was completed in 1969.

== House design ==
The Featherston House sits on sloping ground, at the edge of a parkland in the suburbs. The Featherston's, owners of the house, were open to new ideas and Boyd had the creative freedom to design an alternative scheme, with the theme of living in a garden. The design approach was considered radical at that time with full glassed windows, overlooking the bush land, its garden at the ground floor and platforms that are placed strategically from the chimney, placed in the centre. The Featherston house took on the idea of a beautiful tree house. The owner describes her bedroom— “with its dizzying outlook from the highest of the four platforms — as a "nest.

In 1953, Boyd successfully achieved the vision of the combination of window and wall and launched The Stegbar 'Windowall' that year. The firm of Stegbar had been founded in Melbourne in 1946 by Brian Stegley (1920–1974) ('Steg-') and George Barrow ('-bar') with the intention of manufacturing clock cases and office furniture. In 1950 Stegbar made timber windows from their factory on the corner of Bay and Aberdeen Roads in Sandringham. Robin Boyd designed the Stegbar 'Windowall' system which revolutionised the firm's economic base. The overall appearance of the Stegbar 'Windowall' was light but the frames made of hardwood were resilient enough to hold any roof load. Individual framing members were continuous in both directions – unbroken mullions and transoms - intersecting each other in a copyright halved joint, alike a floor to ceiling window.

The roof is translucent cellular polycarbonate, allowing soft light to pass through and light up the space below at all times of the day. This is the third roof solution to be tried and the most successful. A wall of glass at the south elevation of the house lets additional light in and also provides views to the treed parkland beyond. The eastern wall hides the kitchen, family and guest bedrooms, located in their own zone, with the flat above. Meanwhile, the other service areas are placed behind the western wall. Some of the more interesting features of the Featherston House are Boyd's preference of Japanese design, incorporating natural air conditioning, adapted to the Australian weather. The design includes three flaps built into the platform which can be utilised to draw air from a “cool room" to ventilate the house.

== Award ==
- RAIA Gold Medal 1969

== See also ==
- Architecture of Melbourne
- Australian residential architectural styles
