= Robin Boyd House I =

Heritage-listed house in Melbourne, Victoria, Australia

- Location of the house in Greater Metropolitan Melbourne
- Former names: 158 Riversdale Road, Camberwell
- Alternative names: Former Robin Boyd House; 664–666 Riversdale Road, Camberwell

General information
- Status: Completed
- Type: House
- Architectural style: International style
- Location: 664–666 Riversdale Road, Camberwell, City of Boroondara, Melbourne, Victoria, Australia
- Coordinates: 37°49′59″S 145°04′18″E
- Year built: 1946–1947
- Completed: 1947; 79 years ago
- Client: Robin Boyd and family
- Owner: Boyd family (1946–1973?); Maria Rajendran (1973–2022)

Technical details
- Material: Bricks; timber; glass; steel
- Grounds: 2,008 m^{2} (21,610 sq ft)

Design and construction
- Architect: Robin Boyd

Victorian Heritage Register
- Official name: Former Robin Boyd House
- Type: Registered place
- Criteria: a., d., f., h.
- Designated: 2 October 1991
- Reference no.: VHR H0879
- Heritage overlay no.: HO116
- Category: Residential buildings (private)

Register of the National Estate
- Official name: Robin Boyd House
- Type: Defunct register
- Designated: undated
- Reference no.: 18383

The Robin Boyd House I, also known as the Former Robin Boyd House, is a house located at 664–666 Riversdale Road (Note: Previously known as 158 Riversdale Road.) in Camberwell, in the City of Boroondara, in the inner eastern suburbs of Melbourne, in Victoria, Australia.

The house was designed by Robin Boyd in 1946, which the Boyds moved into a year later. Boyd was known not only as an architect but also an architectural writer, educator and commentator. Born in 1919, as a member of the Boyd family, he came from a creative family background of sculptors, painters and architects. He and his wife Patricia occupied the Camberwell home with their two daughters for approximately twelve years, until 1959, when their Walsh Street home in South Yarra was completed.

Built between 1946 and 1947 on the traditional lands of the Wurundjeri people, the house was added to the Victorian Heritage Register on 2 October 1991 in recognition of its social, historical, and architectural significance; and was also added to a non-statutory list by the Victorian branch of the National Trust on 16 April 1987 and identified for possible future inclusion on the now defunct Register of the National Estate on an unknown date.

== History ==
The International Modernist-style house was built in two phases by Boyd. The house was originally located on the bank of a former creek. This creek, which ran along the eastern half of the site, was converted to an open horse-shoe drain and was subsequently enclosed and covered with fill. Hence, site for the house's construction was restricted to the western half of the site. The first stage was designed in 1946 and was completed in the following year. It is the first house built which Boyd designed himself. The second stage was designed in 1951 after Boyd had returned from his first overseas trip to Europe, made possible by winning the Haddon Scholarship, and was completed in 1952.

=== Heritage disputes ===
In 1973, the house was purchased by Maria Rajendran and her husband (Note: Rajendran's husband died in 2010.) who, in 1975, further extended the dwelling to the south with a two-storey structure. As a result of these alterations to Boyd's 1952 additions, the original design was significantly altered. In 1987, the Victorian branch of the National Trust added the house to its non-statutory heritage list; and in November 1990 served an interim preservation order forbidding demolition or alteration of the house under the provisions of the Building Control Act 1981. The following year, the house was added to the statutory Historic Buildings Register, the forebares of the Victorian Heritage Register. Over thirty years, Rajendran made multiple unsuccessful applications for the house to be removed from the register.

Without obtaining the necessary heritage permit, in May 1999 Rajendran made structural changes to the house including removing the roof and other parts of Boyd's 1952 extension. On application by the Heritage Council, in a landmark order made under the Heritage Act 1995, the Supreme Court of Victoria ordered Rajendran in 2002 to restore the building to its condition prior to the May 1999 renovations. At the time, Rajendran commented:

"I'm not prepared to make a museum of this house and that is what they want me to do. If the building is of such state and national importance then the state should own it."

— Maria Rajendran, as reported in The Age, April 2002.

The roof of the 1952 section of the building was reconstructed in 2004. Rajendran again unsuccessfully sought to have the house removed for the register in 2015, that was dismissed on appeal in 2017; and a further application was made in 2019, that, in May 2019, was again dismissed. A repair order was issued by Heritage Victoria in 2020 for urgent works to the house; and the works were completed in April 2022.

Following the death of Maria Rajendran, in June 2022 the house, set on 2,008 square metres (21,610 sq ft), was sold by her estate for $2.06 million.

== Description ==
The house is the earliest known extant residence designed by Boyd. It is unique in being a house that Boyd designed for his personal use and occupied and extended over a period of twelve years. This strong association with Boyd is particularly significant because Boyd was an important architect and a prominent social critic and commentator. He played a major role in the development of architecture and architectural thinking in Victoria for four decades. The house through its alteration is important in that it demonstrates the architectural development of Boyd, from the early period of his career in the 1940s when he expounded his theories on "Victorian Regionalism", to the emerging "internationalism" of the 1950s. The building is a seminal work which can be regarded as the prototype of the post-World War II modern house in Victoria. It extended the leading architecture of its time and strongly influenced an emerging group of architects. The house is of architectural significance in that it demonstrates innovative design with regard to response to site, informality in planning, flowing spatial arrangements, innovative use of materials, and incorporation of built-in features. These are all aspects of domestic design which subsequently became common.

== See also ==
- Architecture of Melbourne
- List of places on the Victorian Heritage Register in the City of Boroondara
- Robin Boyd House II
