= Heritage gardens in Australia =

This page combines data from 13 written reference books about Australian heritage gardens, covering 200 years of garden heritage. Private gardens have been excluded from the list.

== 2017 Bicentennial celebrations ==
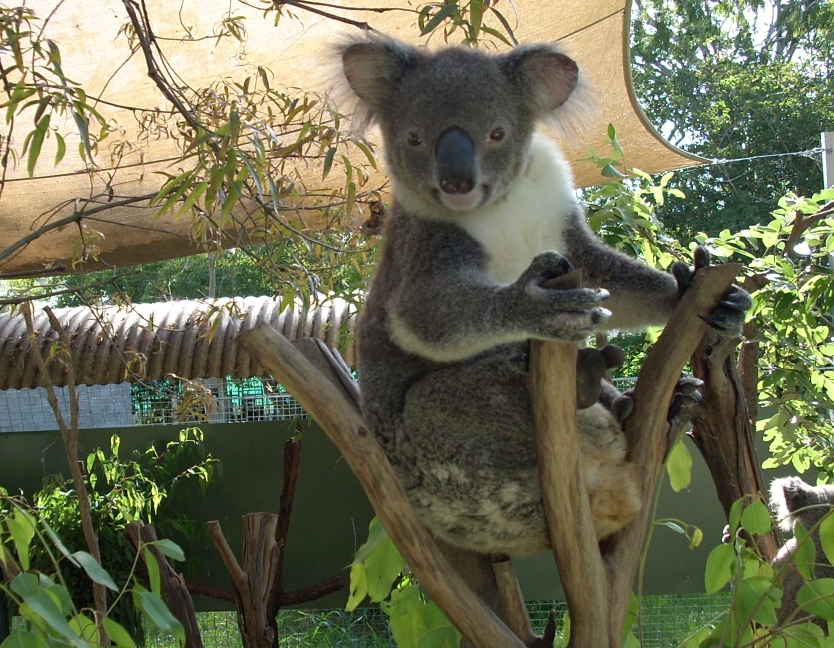
Koala at Rockhampton Botanic Gardens

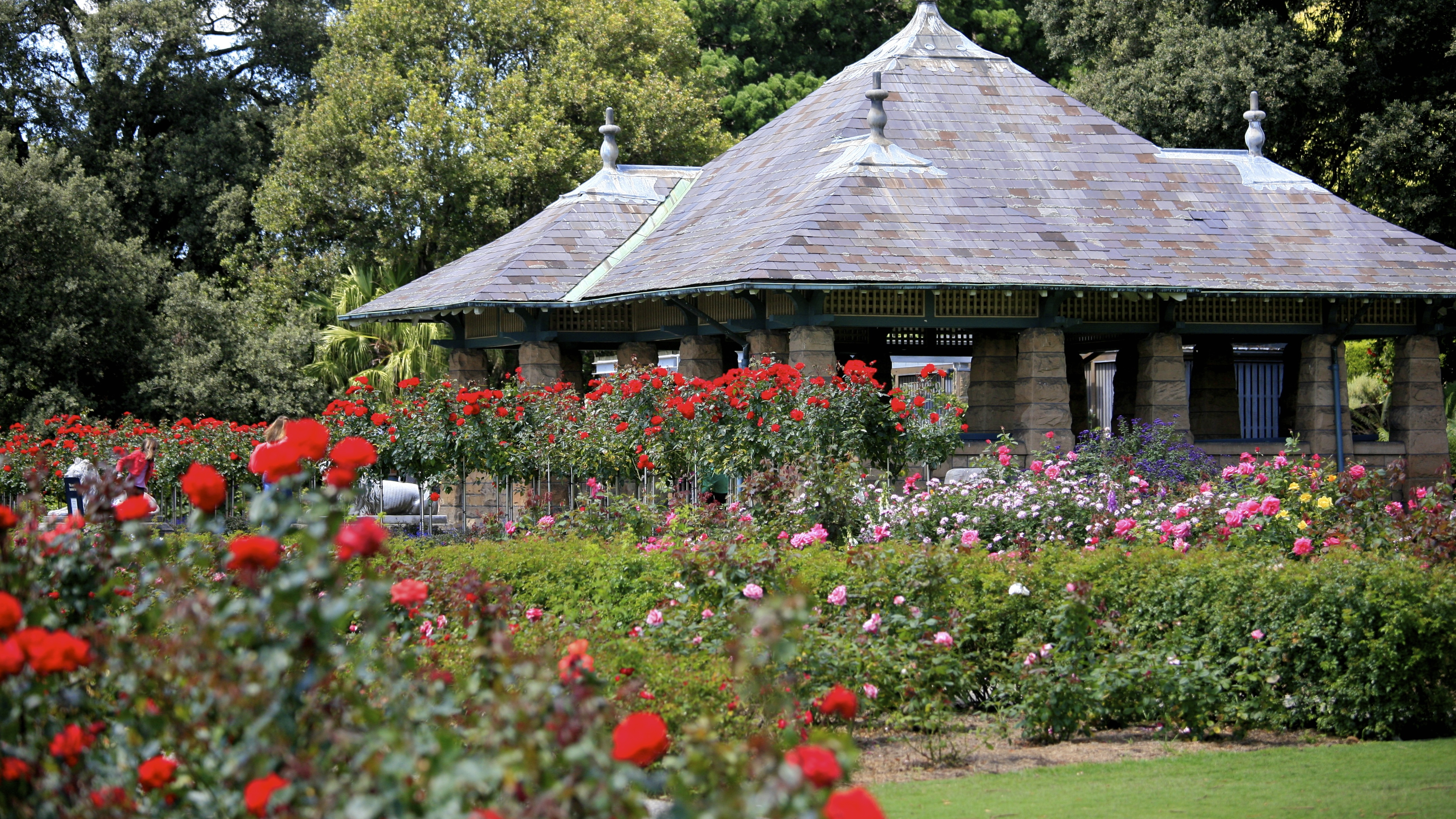
Roses in the Sydney Botanical Gardens

Bicentennial celebrations were held at Woolmers, Tasmania, and the National Rose Garden in 2017.

== Heritage Registers ==
The Australian Heritage Register, Australian states and the National Trust of Australia protect heritage gardens and trees, but local authorities normally only list and protect built properties rather than their heritage-listed gardens alone. The National Trust of Tasmania does not maintain a publicly available list of registered properties.

Similarly, the Tasmanian Heritage Register (THR) only lists addresses, without reasons why a property is heritage listed. An enquirer must apply directly to the THR office for the heritage document for each address. In 2016 the Tasmanian Heritage Council advertised that it intended to remove over 500 Hobart locations from the THR, although these properties would still be protected under local government schedules .

Similar heritage lists include the List of historic homesteads in Australia, the Inventory of Gardens and Designed Landscapes in Scotland, and The National Trust for Places of Historic Interest or Natural Beauty in the UK.

== Index of heritage and renowned Australian gardens ==
An Index of Heritage, Historic and Renowned Gardens in Australia numbers about 400 unique gardens.
- Australia has a diverse range of climates, established under any of these conditions, even in desert, and barren areas, in bogs, rocks and in coastal gale.
- The vocations of the people who build these (extreme) garden landscapes are of garden designers, horticulturalists, landscape gardeners, plantsmen (or plantswomen) and their garden designs are a popular feature of contemporary culture.
- There is an extensive range of publications which feature garden designs and designers (over 5000 books just on garden design), and this popularity has led to the rise of celebrity gardeners, who use their print, radio and TV shows to bring garden designs to every household.

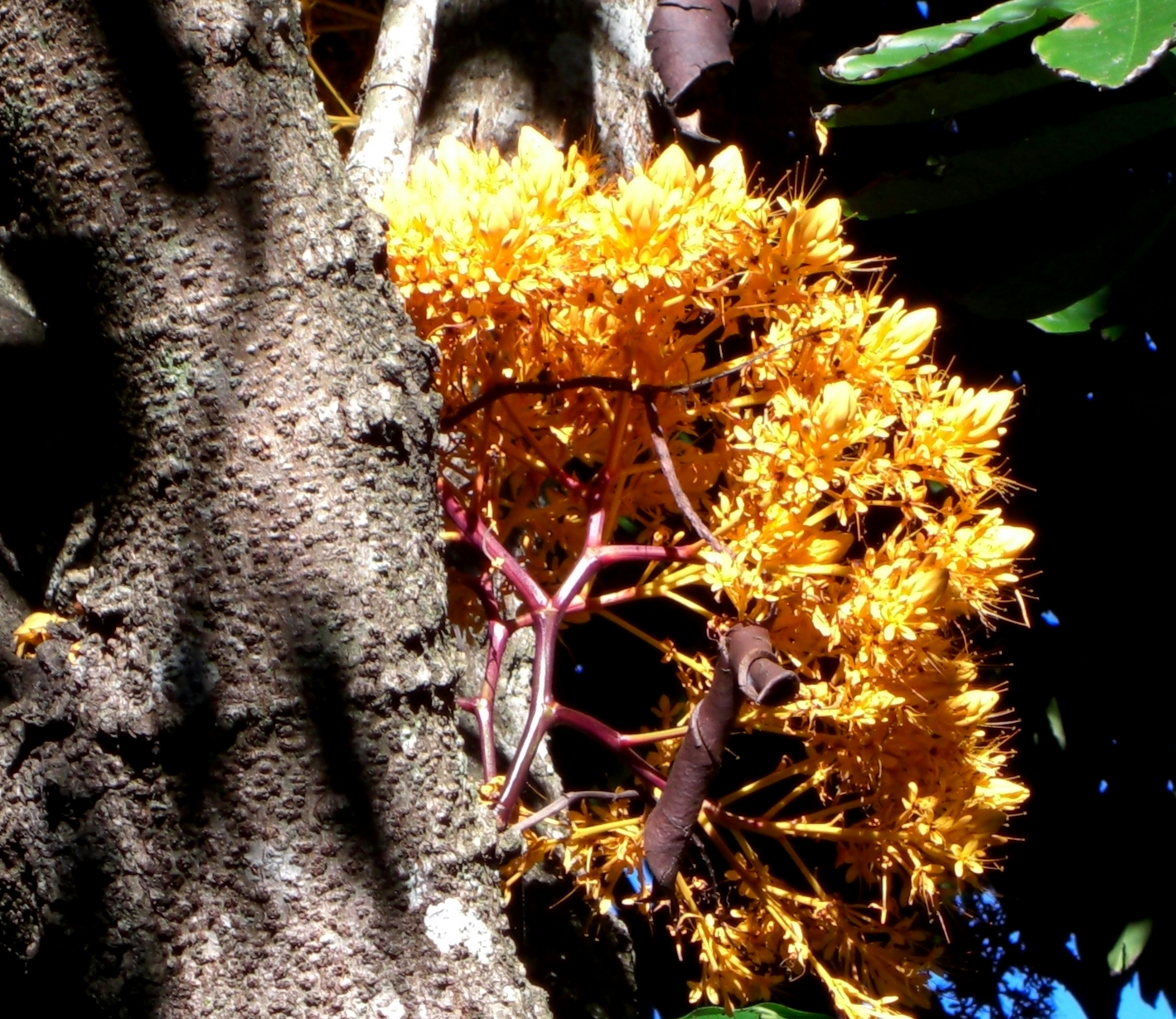
Plant growing in the Flecker Botanic Gardens, Cairns Queensland

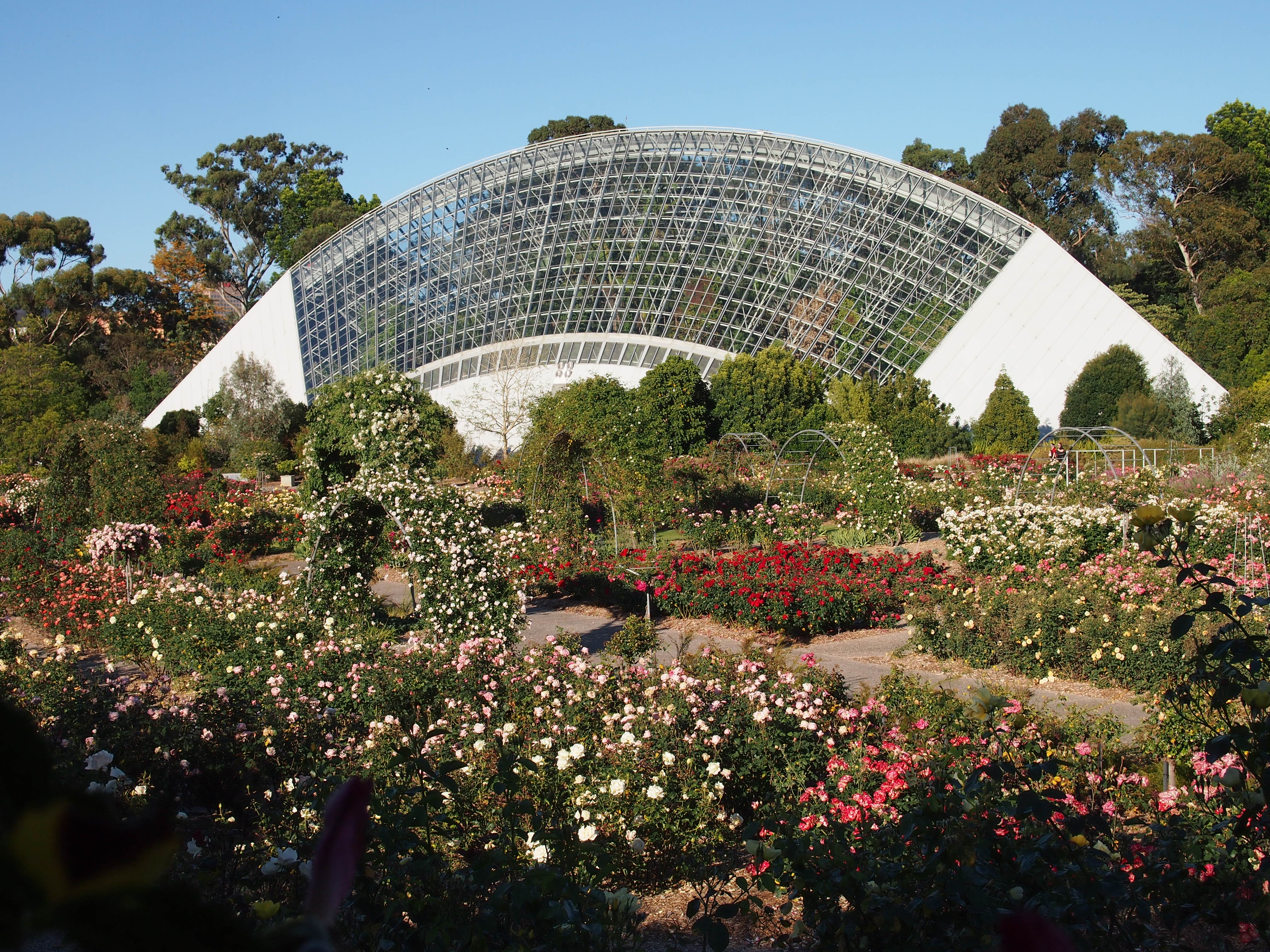
Rose garden, Adelaide Botanic Garden, South Australia

- A specialist Australian Garden Design Study Group has formed and actively promotes garden heritage.
- Touring Australian and overseas gardens is a notable tourist trend.
- Top Garden design trends include the proliferation of garden clubs, sustainability, waterwise, xeriscaping and the Australian plant garden, or bush garden.

These heritage gardens are noted as either, being publicly open to visitors, or (normally) more private, and open only at limited times, usually for a fee payable upon entry.

Many more notable Australian gardens are available to visit than these listed here, usually through the Open Gardens schemes. The Index to Australian Open Gardens will be a Wikipedia page too (650 gardens).

- Index Sources – 13 Reference Books summarised below.

== Heritage gardens of the Australian Capital Territory ==
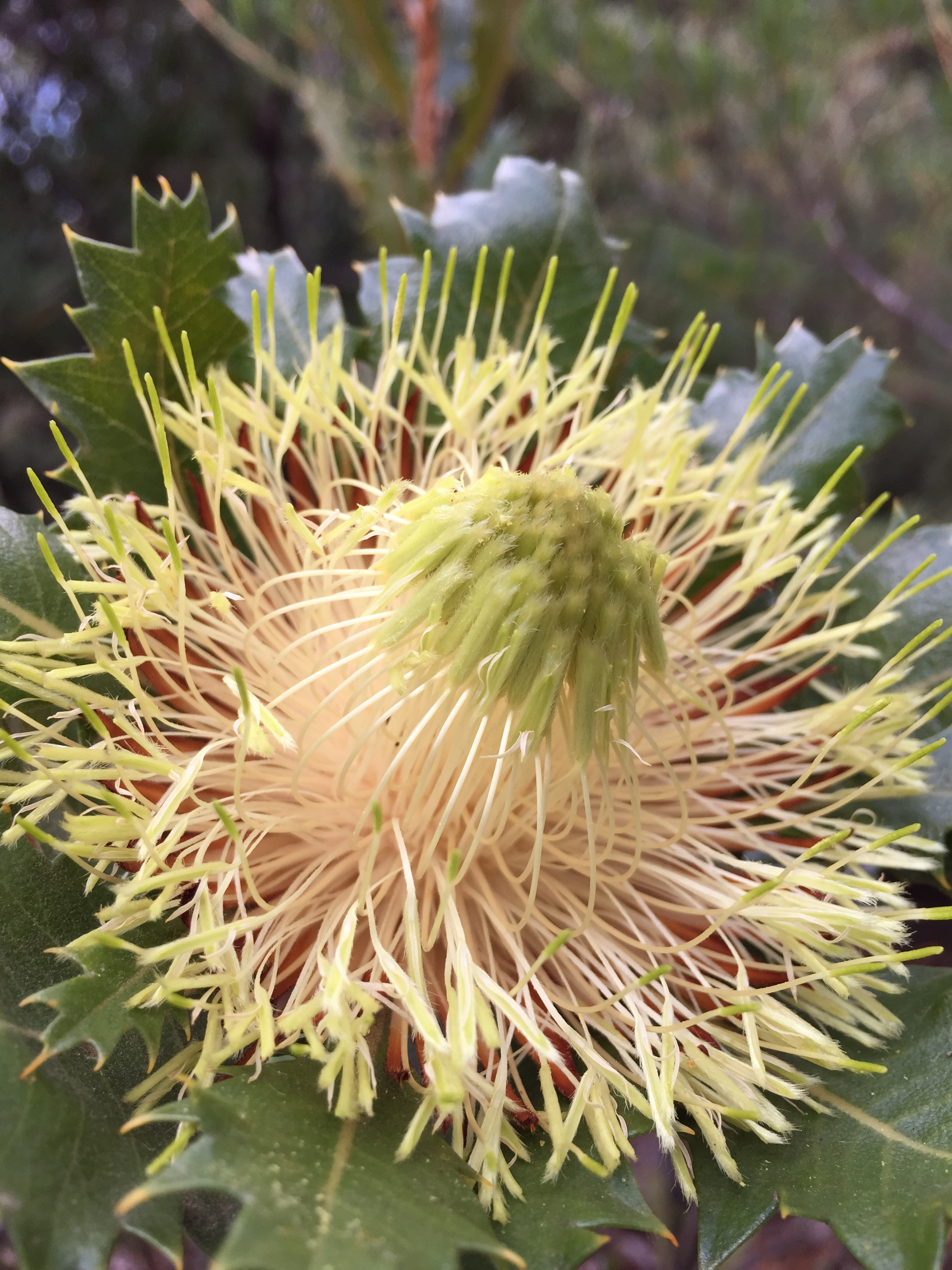
Banksia heliantha, Australian National Botanic Gardens

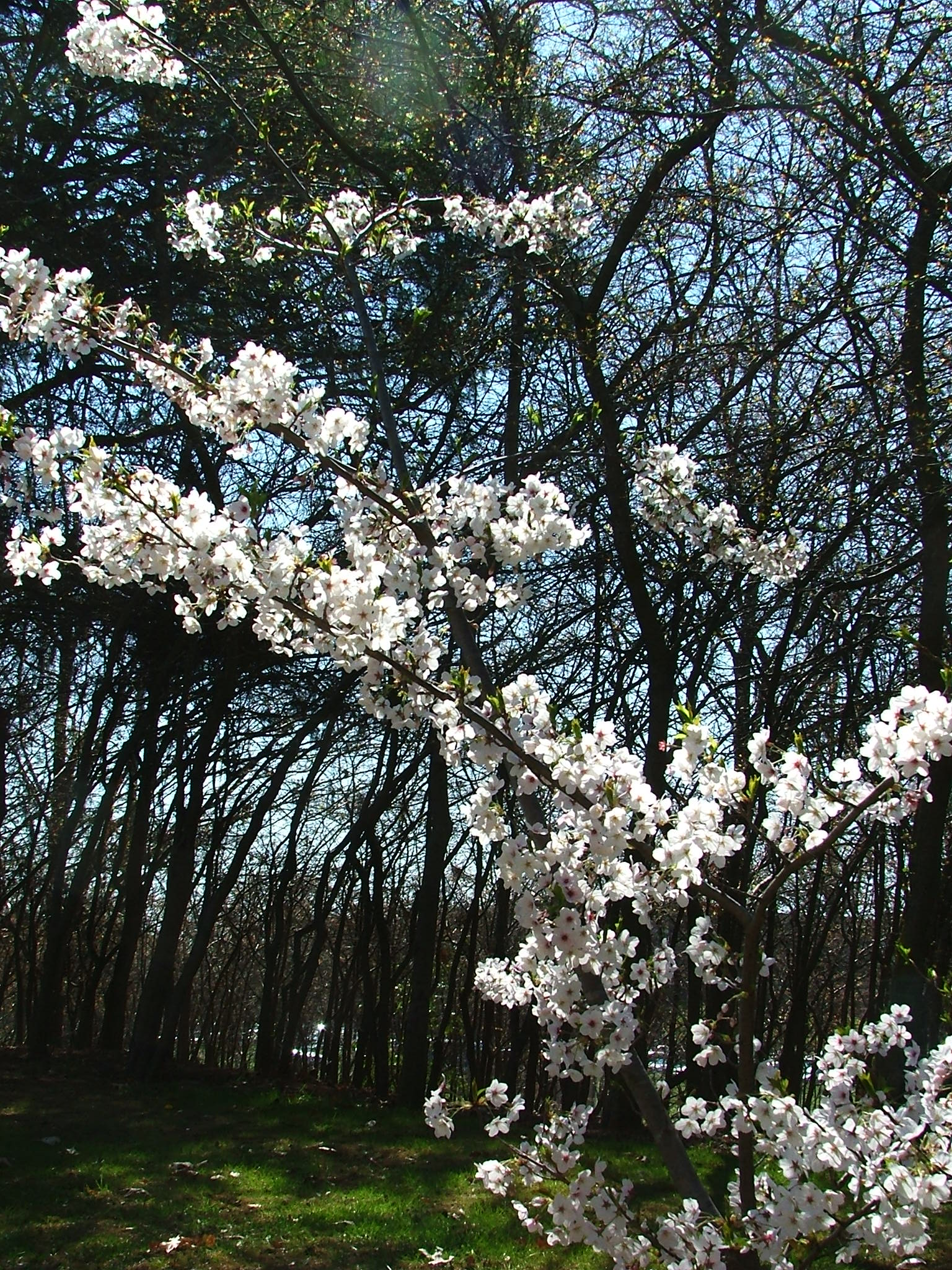
Established tree in flower at Commonwealth Park

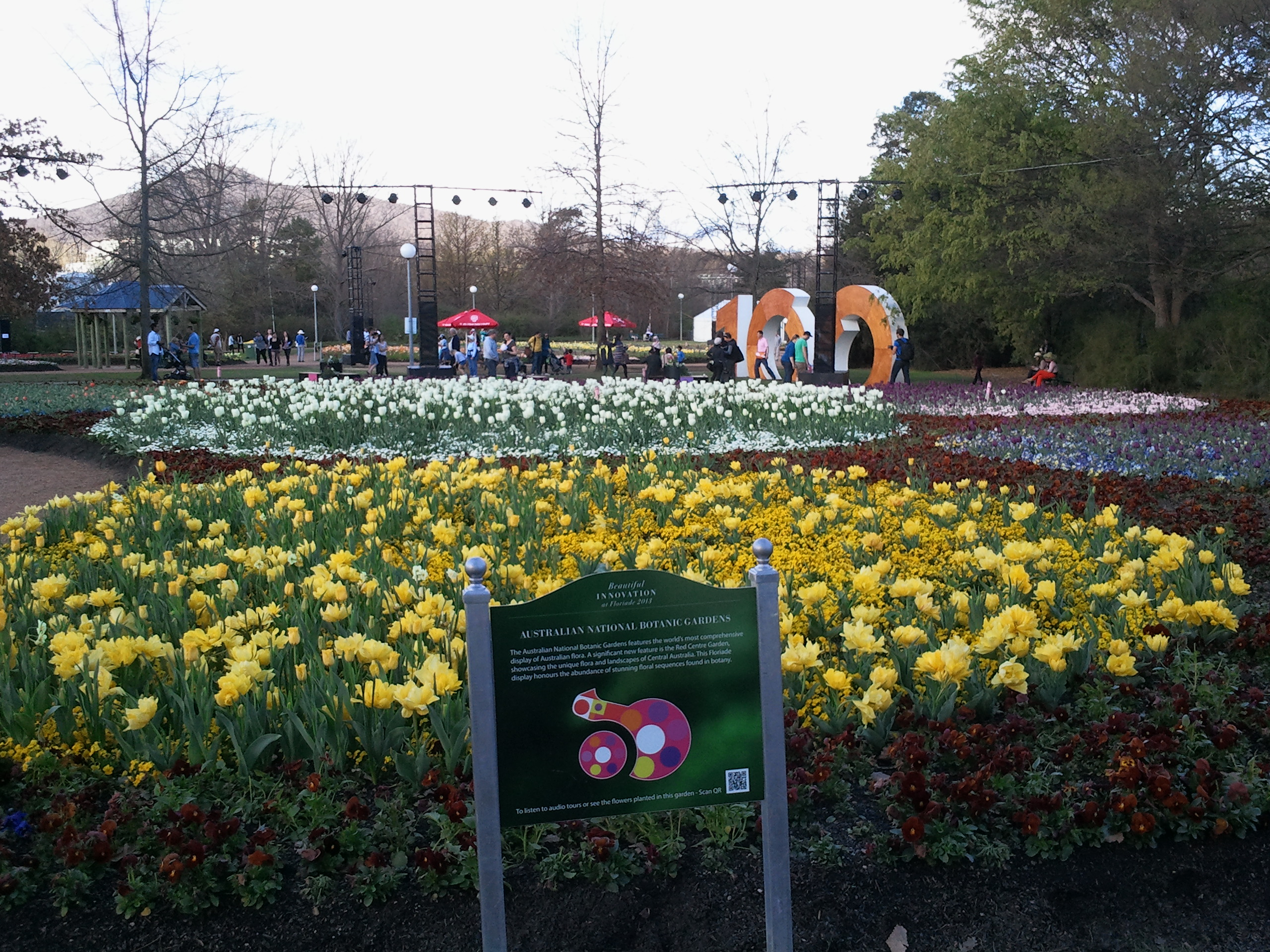
Floriade Canberra 100th anniversary flower beds

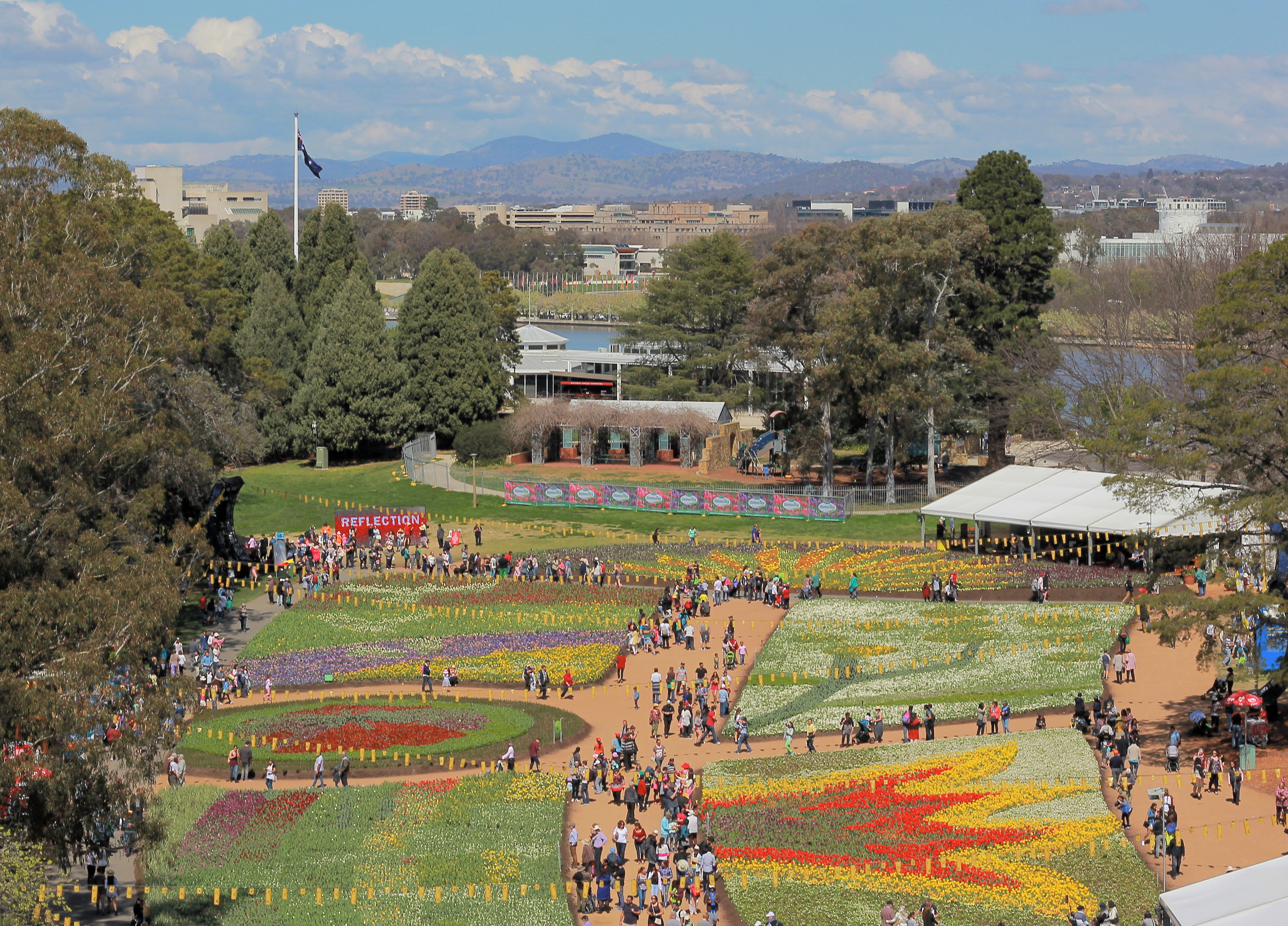
Canberra's Floriade 2013

ID	Name	Address	State	Source code	Source detail	Access	References	Year	Style
Floriade Canberra 100th anniversary	Commonwealth Park	Albert St, Canberra ACT 2600	ACT	ABGG No. 29	pp. 171–174	Public	Commonwealth Park – Wikipedia; Commonwealth Park (Visit Canberra); Commonwealth Park;		Dry climate
Commonwealth Park in Canberra Commonwealth Park in Canberra Commonwealth Park in Canberra Commonwealth Park Established tree in flower at Commonwealth Park Floriade 2012
	Government House	Dunrossil Drive, Yarralumla, Canberra ACT 2600	ACT	TGGA No. 57 ABGG No. 34	pp. 133–135 pp. 193–198	Private	Government House Gardens; Government House – VisitCanberra; Yarralumla, Australian Capital Territory – Wikipedia; Government House – Governor-General of the Commonwealth;		Dry climate
Government House 1927 Aerial view of Government House, Canberra Government House in 2011 Government House 1927 Government House 1927
	Japanese Embassy	112 Empire Circuit, Yarralumla ACT 2600	ACT	TGGA No. 13	pp. 40–41	Private	Garden of the Ambassador's Residence; not to be confused with the Cowra Japanese Garden		Japanese
	Lambrigg Station	Tharwa	ACT	USACG No. 17	pp. 109–114	Private	Henry B.S.Gullett (1914–1999); Lambrigg, Tharwa – Wikipedia; Something arty in garden of delight; William Farrer – Lambrigg Station	1890s	Stately structured
	National Botanic Gardens	Clunies Ross St, Acton ACT 2601	ACT	ABGG No. 36 TGGA No. 73	pp. 205–214 pp. 180–181	Public	Maps of the Australian National Botanic Gardens; Australian National Botanic Gardens – Botanical Web Portal; Australian National Botanic Gardens – Wikipedia; Australian National Botanic Gardens – home page; Australian National Botanic Gardens – visiting; What's on – Australian National Botanic Gardens – Parks Australia;		Dry climate
Australian National Botanic Gardens sign Australian National Botanic Gardens Banksia blechnifolia Banksia heliantha Banksia speciosa
	Tulip Tops	20 Old Federal Highway via Sutton, Southern Highlands, NSW.	ACT	ACG No. 5.	pp. 40–47	Private	Tulip Top Gardens; Admission-Refreshments-Menu-Prices – Tulip Top Gardens; Tulip Top Gardens 2016 – Canberra – WeekendNotes; Tulip Top Gardens (Sutton, Australia): Top Tips Before You Go.; Disappointed Floriade flower fans laud Tulip Top – Canberra Times; Tulip Top Gardens – Facebook;		
	Wild Garden, Yarralumla	Dunrossil Drive, Yarralumla, Canberra ACT	ACT	GIT No. 17	pp. 76–77	Private	For planting by Lady Gowrie and her friend, Ethel Cummins.	1938	Edna Walling

== Heritage and renowned gardens of New South Wales ==
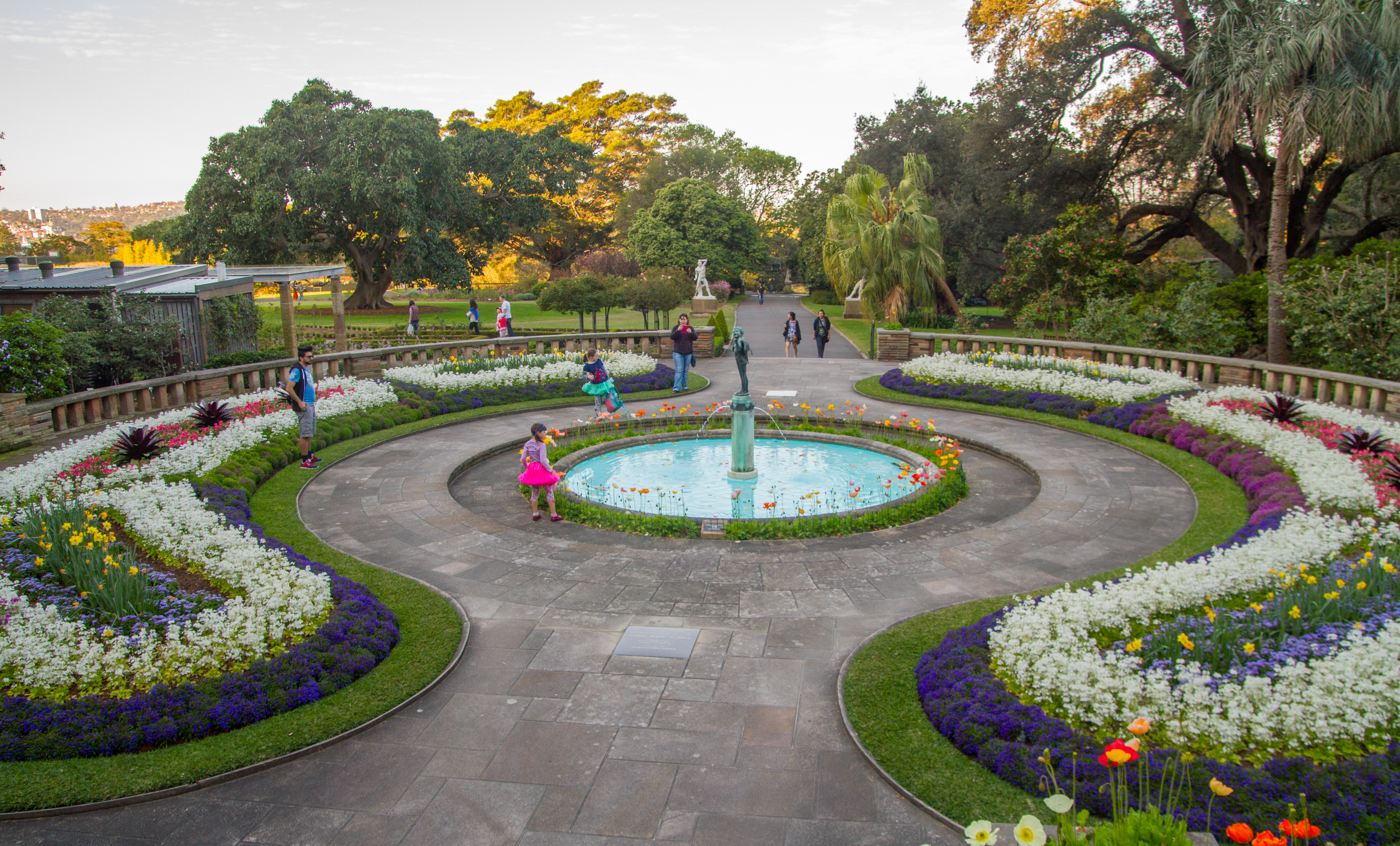
Royal Botanic Garden, Sydney 13 September 2015

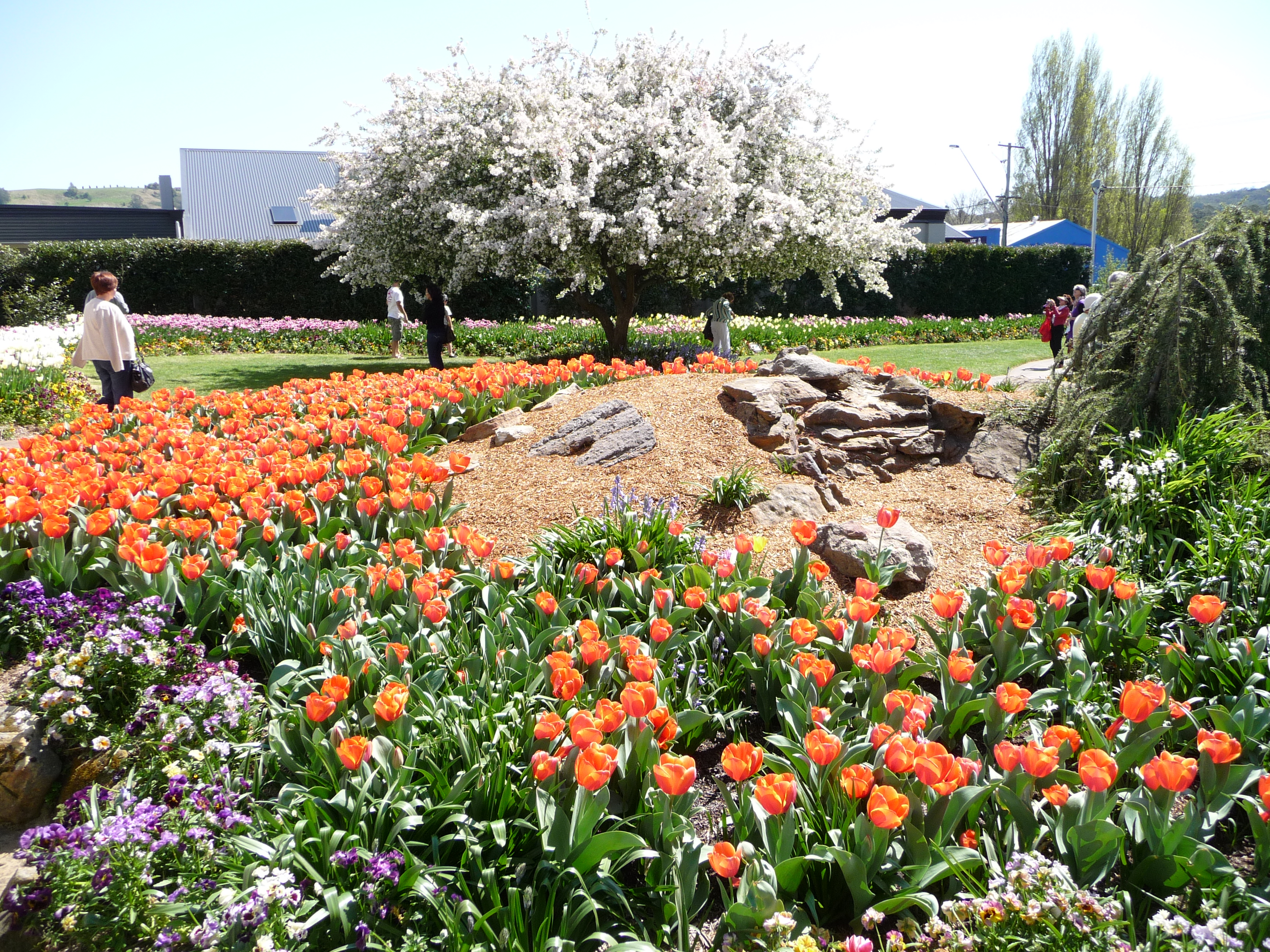
Tulip Festival in Bowral 23 September 2011

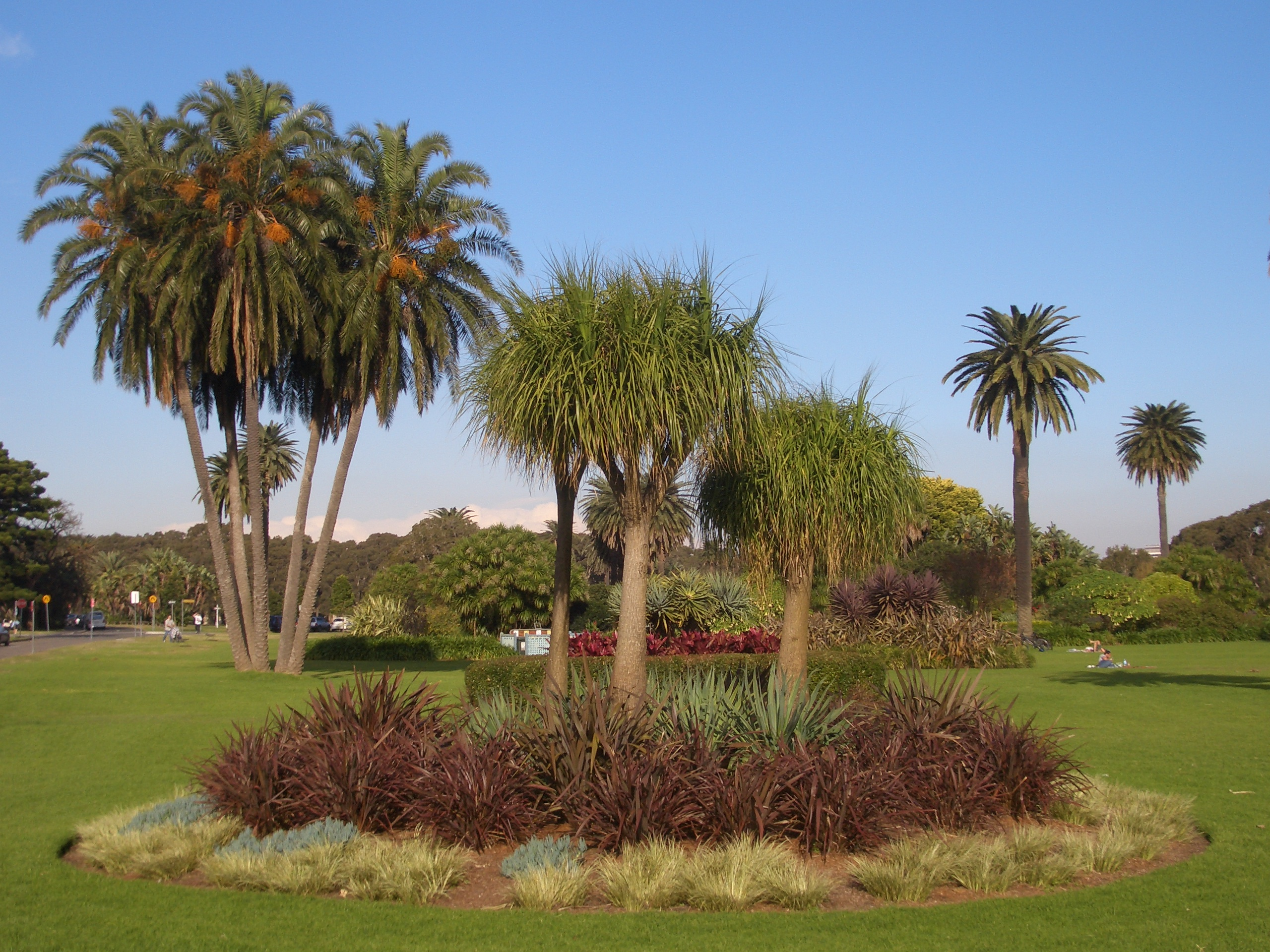
Centennial Park, Sydney 3 June 2007

ID	Name	Address	State	Source code	Source detail	Access	References	Year	Style
	Admiralty House	109 Kirribilli Avenue, Kirribilli	NSW	TGGA No. 54 GGA No. 14	pp. 124–127 pp. 118–121	Private	Admiralty House, Sydney – Wikipedia; Admiralty House – Governor-General of the Commonwealth of Australia; Admiralty House – The Australiana Fund; Admiralty House – NSW Environment & Heritage; Admiralty House Open Day – Sydney Morning Herald;		
	Albury Botanic Gardens	Smollett Street and Wodonga Place, Albury	NSW	TGGA No. 24	pp. 64–65	Public	Albury Botanic Gardens; Albury Botanic Gardens – Albury Wodonga Australia		
Albury Botanic Gardens Rose Cajun Sunrise, Albury Botanical Gardens Rose Mary Rose Albury Botanical Gardens Pink Petunias, Albury Botanical Gardens Albury botanical gardens panorama
Tumut Garden	Alex Stockwell Gardens	24 Richmond Street, Tumut	NSW	TGGA	pp. 144–145	Private	Tumut Stockwell Gardens; Think Creative Video – Tumut Stockwell Gardens		
Village Garden	Bayview Garden Village	36–42 Cabbage Tree Road, Bayview	NSW	ABGG # 52	pp. 281–282	Private	Aveo Bayview Gardens, Bayview Retirement Village		Warm climate
Spectacular Holiday Home setting	Berrara	Kirby's Beach, Berrara	NSW	ACGM No. 13.	pp. 196–211	Private	Indicative neighbouring locations: $9 million NSW South Coast property; Beautiful Bunky's By The Sea;		Coastal
	Birkenburn	3582 Kings Highway, Bungendore	NSW	GGA No. 33	pp. 192–194	Private	Birkenburn Farm, Bungendore, NSW on Flickr; Historic Bungendore property sliced up for bush retreats	1890	
	Bisley	102 Mount Irvine Road, Mount Wilson	NSW	ACG No. 11	pp. 78–85	Private	Beverly and Graham Thompson; Bisley garden at Mt Wilson – GardenDrum Bisley Mount Wilson – The Gardening Magazine; Secret Gardens On Display at Mount Wilson Festival – Blue Mountains;		Cool climate
Autumn in Mt Wilson Autumn serenity in Mt. Wilson Beautiful old trees in Mt. Wilson Mt Wilson - panoramio
Homestead Garden	Blackdown Homestead	90 Eleven Mile Drive, Bathurst	NSW	ACWG	pp. 52–59	Private	Artist Tim Storrier; Bathurst's Blackdown Homestead – Old estates for sale; 90 Eleven Mile Drive, Bathurst, NSW 2795 – Property Details; Archibald Prize winner sells his Eleven Mile Drive gem;		
	Bobundara	3061 Maffra Road, Bobundara, near Cooma	NSW	USACG No. 1	pp. 1–9	Private	Percy F.S. Spence (1868–1933); Bobundara -NSW Environment & Heritage	1949	Cool climate
Bridge across Murrumbidgee River, Bolaro	Bolaro Station	Adaminaby	NSW	USACG No. 2	pp. 10–12	Private	Patrick White; Bolaro Station near Adaminaby	1908	
	Boomerang	Billyard Avenue, Elizabeth Bay	NSW	PG No. 10	pp. 172–185	Very Private	Boomerang, Elizabeth Bay – Wikipedia; For Sale 2016; NSW Heritage Register; Boomerang, the $60 million Elizabeth Bay harbourfront;		Myles Baldwin, Spanish mission
Boomerang as seen from Beare Park Boomerang from the waterfront of Elizabeth Bay Boomerang as seen from Sydney Harbour Harbour view of Boomerang (LHS) Boomerang garden before 1930 Pre-1930 view of theBoomerang garden waterfront site before building commenced Bay view over Boomerang House Old Waterfront properties in Elizabeth Bay Old Garden before building Boomerang
	Botanic Gardens	Botanic Gardens Sydney NSW	TGGA No. 79	pp. 196–201	Public	Royal Botanic Garden; Royal Botanic Garden and the Domain; Royal Botanic Garden, Sydney – Wikipedia		Temperate, Cool climate Associated Gardens: Mount Annan Botanic Garden; Mount Tomah Botanic Garden (Blue Mountains)	
Entrance gates to the Botanic Gardens, Domain, Sydney Royal Botanic Gardens Royal Botanic Gardens, Sydney Royal Botanic Gardens, Sydney Royal Botanic Gardens, Sydney Royal Botanic Gardens, Sydney Royal Botanic Gardens, Sydney Palm Grove, Royal Botanic Gardens, Sydney A woman in the Botanic Gardens, 1934, by Sam Hood Agathis moorei Kauri, Royal Botanic Gardens Sydney An evening in the Royal Botanic Gardens Sydney
Brindabella Station Sign	Brindabella Station	308 Brindabella Valley Road, Brindabella	NSW	USACG No. 4	pp. 21–26	Private	Miles Franklin (1879–1954); Home Brindabella station; Brindabella Station – VisitCanberra; Brindabella Station – Wikipedia;	1890s	Cool climate
Miles Franklin, 1902 My Brilliant Career 1st edition cover (Miles Franklin) Miles Franklin 1939 Portrait of Miles Franklin, circa 1940s Miles Franklin and Frank Clune Miles Franklin
	Bronte House	470 Bronte Road, Bronte	NSW	PG No. 5	pp. 104–119	Private	Bronte House – Wikipedia; Bronte House – Register of the National Estate; Bronte House Gardens: NSW Heritage;		Victorian, gardenesque
Bronte House & Garden Bronte House & Garden Bronte House & Garden Bronte House & Garden Bronte House (1845)
Colonial Farm near Camden	Brownlow Hill Estate	Loop Road, Orangeville	NSW	ABGG	pp. 235–238	Private	Brownlow Hill, New South Wales – Wikipedia; Brownlow Hill Estate – NSW Heritage;		Warm climate
	Burrawang	Pittwater	NSW	ABGG #51	pp. 279–280	Private	Dr Mary Gilder; E M (Mary) Gilder Scholarship Established in 1997 by a donation from Dorothy Gilder in memory of her sister Dr. Mary Gilder who graduated BSc in 1943 and MBBS (Honours) in 1959, despite suffering the effects of polio from the age of six years.		Warm climate
	Buskers End	14 St Clair Street, Bowral	NSW	ACWG #4	pp. 34–41	Private	Joan Arnold; Sale and photos; 'Buskers End', Bowral NSW – The Gardening Magazine; A touch of genus – The Australian;		
	Cambewarra	Coolah	NSW	RGA No. 33	pp. 192–195	Private	Nan Stibbard;		Roses, wine
	Centennial Parklands	Grand Drive, Centennial Park	NSW	TGGA No. 41	p. 97	Public	Centennial Parklands: Home; Centennial Park, New South Wales – Wikipedia;	1901	Federation style
	Chinoiserie	Southern Highlands	NSW	ACG No. 4	pp. 34–49	Private	Welcome to Chinoiserie B&B and Gardens; Chinoiserie – the Southern Highlands of NSW; Chinoiserie – Facebook;		Chinese style
Peppers Sutton Forest	Comfort Hill	Hume Highway, Sutton Forest	NSW	PG No. 12	pp. 202–211	Private	Sutton Forest farm sells for record $14m;	1840s	Homestead
Private garden	Coolah Creek Homestead	Coolah Creek Road, Coolah	NSW	PGA No. 5 ACWG	pp. 32–37 pp. 68–75	Private	Judy Arnott (1933–2016); Coolah – SMH;		
	Coolringdon Homestead	1432 Kosciuszko Road, Coolringdon	NSW	USACG No. 7	pp. 39–46	Private	Betty Casey Litchfield (1907–1999); Coolringdon | NSW Environment & Heritage; Coolringdon Homestead – Visit Cooma;	1823	Cool climate
John and Betty Casey, owners of Coolringdon, Cooma, NSW, 1937 Coolringdon Homestead, Cooma, NSW circa 1900 Coolringdon NSW 2630, Australia Theresa Wallace - Mrs Mary Wallace, wife of William Wallace of Coolringdon Date circa 1860 Roadside, Coolringdon NSW 2630, Australia
	Corbett Gardens	Wingecarribee Street, Bowral	NSW	TGGA No. 74	pp. 182–183	Public	Tulip Time; Corbett Gardens – AroundYou; Corbett Gardens – Bowral Attraction – NSW		Cool climate, Tulips
	Cowra Japanese Garden and Cultural Centre	Ken Nakajima Place, Cowra	NSW	Web	Cowra Japanese Gardens	Public	Multi award-winning Cowra Japanese Garden; Cowra Japanese Garden – Australian National Botanic Gardens;	1979	Japanese
Japanese Garden, Cowra Japanese Garden, Cowra Japanese Garden, Cowra Japanese Garden, Cowra Cowra Japanese Garden Spring 2004 Cowra Japanese Garden Spring 2004 Cowra Japanese Garden Spring 2004
	Denham Court Homestead	238 Campbelltown Road, Denham Court	NSW	USACG No. 8	pp. 47–54	Private	Hardy Wilson (1881–1955); Sale & Photos; Denham Court;	1830s	
Hunter Valley Gardens Rose Spectacular	Dulwich Estate	Singleton	NSW	RGA No. 31	pp. 187–190	Private	Doreen Hall; Hunter Valley Gardens Rose Spectacular; Historic Singleton Rose Festival (now Flower Festival); Hunter Valley Settler James Glennie – Dulwich – Free Settler or Felon?;	1870	Roses, wine
	Durham Hall	666 Majors Creek Road, Jembaicumbene	NSW	RGA No. 35	pp. 203–209	Private	Durham Hall Garden – Register of the National Estate; Durham Hall 2014 | Braidwood Open Gardens; Jembaicumbene, New South Wales – Wikipedia; Open gardens – Rare glimpse of Braidwood gardens;	1840s	Roses, Old, basically unaltered in design
	E.G. Waterhouse National Camellia Garden	President Avenue, Caringbah South	NSW	ABGG No. 46 TGGA	pp. 255–258 pp. 100–105	Public	E G Waterhouse National Camellia Garden; EG Waterhouse National Camellia Garden – Sydney South Attraction; E.G. Waterhouse Camellia Gardens – Sydney – WeekendNotes; E.G Waterhouse National Camellia Gardens – Sutherland Shire;		Warm?/Cool climate
Camellia 'E.G. Waterhouse' williamsi cross raised by Waterhouse in 1946 Camellia 'Lady Gowrie' williamsii cross by E.G. Waterhouse Camellia 'Beverley Caffin Rosea' bred by E.G. Waterhouse in Gordon 1947 Memorial to Elizabeth Batts Cook (wife of Capt. James Cook), in the E.G. Waterhouse National Camellia Garden, Caringbah Australia
	Elizabeth Bay House	7 Onslow Avenue, Elizabeth Bay	NSW	TGGA No. 15	pp. 44–47	Public	The Arthur McElhone Reserve, a tranquil garden of Elizabeth Bay House; Elizabeth Bay House 7–9 Onslow Ave – National Heritage; Elizabeth Bay House – Sydney Living Museums; Elizabeth Bay House – Potts Point And Woolloomooloo – Sydney;		Tranquil, with grotto
Elizabeth Bay House Elizabeth Bay House Elizabeth Bay House Staircase Simon Fieldhouse Elizabeth Bay House Elizabeth Bay House Elizabeth Bay House
	Emu Creek Estate	Emu Creek Road, Walcha	NSW	ACWG No. 9	pp. 76–83	Private	Annette Gill; Heritage homestead, out-buildings and woolshed: Emu Creek – NSW Environment & Heritage; now extended in Federation Bungalow style. Golden Bale Award 1977 for the finest wool in the world, also Zegna Award.		Influenced by Beatrice Bligh.
	Eryldene, home of E.G. Waterhouse	17 McIntosh Street, Gordon	NSW	GGA No. 19 TGGA	pp. 140–145 pp. 56–59	Public	Eryldene Historic House and Garden; Eryldene, Gordon – Wikipedia; Eryldene – NSW Heritage;	1913	
Eryldene Eryldene, Killara, Sydney Japanese Garden, Eryldene Eryldene, Killara, Sydney, 13 April 2013 Eryldene pigeon coop 2013 Author Sardaka Eryldene garden studio
	Everglades	37 Everglades Avenue, Leura	NSW	ABGG No. 10 TGGA	pp. 71–78 pp. 50–53	Public	Everglades House & Gardens – National Trust	1930s	Temperate, Paul Sorensen
Everglades, Leura Everglades, Leura Everglades, Leura Everglades, Leura Everglades, Leura
	Floral Clock	Bradleys Head Road, Taronga Zoo	NSW	TGGA #51	p. 121	Public	The Floral Clock – Taronga Zoo; Floral Clock @ Taronga Zoo – Sydney – by Alia Tarsoo – WeekendNotes; Garden oddities – floral clocks – Garden Travel Hub; Taronga Zoo – Upper & Lower Entrance Gates, Elephant House; Floral clock at Taronga Park Zoo, Sydney – Photo taken from – Flickr;		Gardenesque
	Frensham	Range Road, Mittagong	NSW	USACG No. 13	pp. 81–86	Private	Harold Cazneaux (1878–1953); Harold Cazneaux – Wikipedia; Cazneaux Collection | National Library of Australia; Frensham School – Wikipedia; Frensham Mittagong – Southern Highlands Online	1913	
	Gidleigh Station	Gidleigh Lane, Bungendore	NSW	USACG No. 14	pp. 87–94	Private	Helen Rutledge, author of My grandfather's House. Recollections of an Australian Family who lived at Rona, Bellevue Hill, NSW. Portrait of Lady Knox, c. 1927–29 by W B McInnes; Gidleigh 'Lost' WW1 Memorial Trees; Obituary – William Forster Rutledge; Bungendore – New South Wales;	1840s	Edwardian
One of Australia's finest gardens – 2017 Publication: "House and Garden at Glenmore"	Glenmore House	Moores Way, Glenmore	NSW	ACG	pp. 60–65	Private	Garden Fair at Glenmore House, Camden; About Mickey Robertson; About Glenmore House; Glenmore House, Kitchen Gardening and Seasonal Cooking – Home; [PDF garden – CAMDEN NSW – Glenmore House; [PDF Australian Country – Glenmore House;		
	Gleniffer Brae	Murphys Avenue, Keiraville	NSW	Web	Uni Wollongong NSW	Public	Paul Sorensen and the Gleniffer Brae Gardens; History of Gleniffer Brae; Gleniffer Brae – NSW Environment & Heritage; Gleniffer Brae – NSW Environment & Heritage;	Remnant historic garden	Paul Sorensen
Keiraville Keiraville Keiraville Keiraville Keiraville
	Government House	Macquarie Street, Sydney	NSW	TGGA #28	pp. 72–77	Private	Government House, and Garden Conservatorium Road, Sydney, NSW; Government House – Governor of New South Wales; Government House – Sydney Living Museums; Government House, Sydney – Wikipedia;	1847	Park setting
Sydney - Government House Gardens Sydney Gov. House fountain in gardens Sydney Gov. House gardens to Opera House Government House Sydney Australia Government House Sydney Australia Government House Front Government House Front Government House Government House Front Government House, Sydney Government House, Sydney, Australia Albert Namatjira at Govt House Sydney Government House, Sydney NSW (Osborne Collection Royal visit 1963 - Garden Party at Government House Royal visit 1963 - Garden Party at Government House
	Gowan Brae	Burradoo	NSW	RGA No. 8	pp. 62–74	Private	Colour co-ordinated tapestry of flowers; Florist Heather Cant		Roses, floristry
	Greenwood	Sydney	NSW	PGA No. 7	pp. 43–46	Private	Dalrymple-Hay Nature Reserve; Elisabeth Longhurst;		Nature reserve
Tilba Tilba NSW	Haxted Homestead	Tilba Tilba	NSW	ACGM #3	pp. 44–59	Private	Dame Zara's "ghost house," Haxstead, at Tilba Tilba; Taken at Tilba – National Library of Australia; YouTube – Tilba Tilba Gardens;		Coastal
Highlands, Wahroonga by Sardaka	Highlands Garden	9 Highlands Avenue, Wahroonga	NSW	TGGA	p. 82	Private	Sale and Photos: 9 Highlands Avenue		Edwardian garden
(Indicative picture only)	Hillview	Old Illawarra Highway, Sutton Forest also supposed to be at 12–14 School Lane, Exeter	NSW	PGA # 10	pp. 58–63	Private	NSW Heritage – Hillview Sutton Forest; NSW governors' country home: Hillview; Sculpture at Hillview; YouTube Video;	1866	
	Holman House	Dover Heights	NSW	ACGM No. 2	pp. 30–43	Private	Holman House – jane irwin landscape architecture; Holman House by Durbach Block Jaggers – Dezeen; Holman House, Dover Heights – Wikipedia; THE HOLMAN HOUSE – Habitusliving.com; On the cliffs of Dover – Cover Story – www.smh.com.au;	Modern	Extreme coastal
	Hyde Park	Hyde Park – City of Sydney	NSW	TGGA No. 8	p. 33	Public	Hyde Park – Sydney – Wikipedia; Hyde Park – City of Sydney;		
The worlds best Hyde Park, Sydney Hyde Park Water Fire Earth sculpture Hyde Park water fountain Hyde Park, Sydney Hyde Park, Sydney Hyde Park in Sydney Hyde Park Hyde Park and St Mary's Cathedral 1932 Hyde Park F.J. Walker fountain Hyde Park F.J. Walker fountain
Edwardian Garden	Ingleneuk	19 Bennett Street, Cremorne	NSW	PG No. 7	pp. 136–145	Private	Ingleneuk – NSW Heritage;		Edwardian, arts and crafts
	Kalua	38 Florida Road, Palm Beach	NSW	ACGM No. 15	pp. 226–239	Private	Kalua is the largest and most prestigious property at Palm Beach (incl gallery); $25m price tag on Palm Beach mansion; Palatial Palm Beach property sells for $25m – Domain; Laurie Sutton the kingpin of Sydney property as he swaps Mosman for Palm Beach;	1920s	Coastal
	Kennerton Green	Mittagong	NSW	ABGG No. 5	pp. 43–50	Private	Australia's only 20th-century listing in the Oxford Companion to Australian Gardens. Past owners include Marylyn Abbott, and Susan Renouf. Garden at Kennerton Green; Sale and Photos; Kennerton Green – Burke's Backyard;		Temperate
	Kildrummie Homestead	Kildrummie Homestead, 26 Halford Drive, Holbrook	NSW	GIT No. 20	pp. 84–87	Private	For the Carnegie family – Mr Douglas and Mrs Margaret Carnegie (1910–2002) Obituary; English elms and Poplars allowed to sucker into a woodland; Rammed earth (pise) construction in 1948; courtyard, stone walls by Edna Walling.	1948	Edna Walling
	Kiloren	1 Hay Street, Crookwell	NSW	GIT No. 23	pp. 96–101	Private	Dr and Mrs Broadbent; Edna Walling garden for sale at Crookwell's Kiloren – Property Observer; The Garden — Kiloren; 1 Hay Street, Crookwell, NSW 2583 – Property Details; Crookwell Memorial Park Rose Garden, New South Wales; Living with Edna Walling – at Kiloren – GardenDrum; Open Gardens in Crookwell, Laggan, Binda NSW | Markdale | Kiloren;	1951	Edna Walling
	Lindesay	1 Carthona Avenue, Darling Point	NSW	ABGG No. 48	pp. 263–268	Private	Lindesay – National Trust; Lindesay, Darling Point – Wikipedia;		Warm climate
Lindesay, Darling Point NSW by Sardaka Lindesay, Darling Point NSW by Sardaka Lindesay, Darling Point NSW by Sardaka Lindesay, Darling Point circa 1855 Campbell Drummond Riddell and his wife Caroline Stuart Riddell (née Rodney. Built Lindsay, Darling Point in 1834)
	Lindfield Park, House and Garden	53–55 Farrer Road, Mount Wilson	NSW	TGGA No. 70	pp. 168–173	Private	Mw024 : Lindfield Park – NSW Environment & Heritage; Mount Wilson & Mount Irvine – Blue Mountains Australia; Mount Wilson and Mount Irvine | Katoomba Area Attraction – Visit NSW;	1960–1970	Terraced, Cool climate
	Lisgar Gardens	23 Lisgar Road, Hornsby	NSW	TGGA No. 30	pp. 80–81	Public	One of Sydney's "Secret Gardens"; Lisgar Gardens – Sydney – WeekendNotes; Where are the Best Hidden Gardens in Hornsby? Lisgar Gardens | Hawkesbury Attraction – Sydney; Lisgar Gardens – Hornsby Shire Council;		
Lisgar Gardens Lisgar Gardens Lisgar Gardens fishponds Lisgar Gardens waterfall Lisgar Gardens waterfall Lisgar Gardens Lisgar Gardens Lisgar Gardens Lisgar Gardens Lisgar Gardens Pavilion Lisgar Gardens Pavilion
	Mahratta	25 Fox Valley Road, Wahroonga	NSW	Web	Friends of Mahratta	Public	The Garden – Mahratta; Welcome to Friends of Mahratta; Australia's master gardener: Paul Sorensen and his gardens;	1941	Paul Sorensen
One of Edna Walling's most famous garden designs, and one of the great country gardens of Australia.	Markdale	Binda	NSW	RAG PGA GGA ACG	pp. 216–227 pp. 64–69 pp. 172–177 pp. 158–162	Private	Markdale Homestead; Ashtons; Markdale Homestead – Crookwell Accommodation – Visit NSW; Large Scale Iconic Property BINDA For Sale View – Colliers International; Retford Park and Markdale: Glorious gardens to thrive beyond Open; Historic Southern Tablelands farm Markdale relisted – Property Observer; Gardening Australia – Fact Sheet: 'Markdale' – ABC; Markdale – Edna Walling Garden; Historic Southern Tablelands farm Markdale;	1920s	Edna Walling
The garden of Markdale at Binda designed by Edna Walling in 1947 Markdale garden at Binda The garden of Markdale at Binda The homestead at Markdale, Binda
Modern Garden Design	Mary Slade's Garden	1483 Peats Ridge Road, Peats Ridge	NSW	ACWG	pp. 28–33	Private	Mary Slade, Paul Sorensen;		Paul Sorensen
	Mayfield Garden	530 Mayfield Road, Oberon	NSW	ACG No. 1	pp. 8–17	Public and private	One of the largest privately owned cool-climate gardens in the world – Welcome to Mayfield Garden; Mayfield Garden Open Days; Mayfield Garden | Facebook; Garrick Hawkins' Mayfield Gardens in Oberon;	1976	Large
	McHattie Park	William & Keppel Streets, Bathurst	NSW	TGGA #62	pp. 148–151	Public	Machattie Park – Bathurst Regional Council; Machattie Park, Bathurst NSW; Dr. Richard Machattie (Machattie Park);	1890	Victorian ccol climate
	Micalago	(Michelago) Station Michelago	NSW	USACG No. 18 GGA	pp. 115–122 pp. 146–151	Private	George Lambert 1873–1930; Michelago – Wikipedia; Michelago Station – NSW Heritage; George Washington Lambert – Wikipedia;	1835	Garden rooms
Cool climate Garden	Milton Park (Mansfield's Farm)	Horderns Road, Bowral	NSW	GGA No. 18 ABGG TGGA	pp. 134–139 pp. 55–62 pp. 158–161	Private	Anthony Hordern; Architects Morrow and De Putron; Edwina an Peter Baillieu; Milton Park Country House Hotel & Spa; Milton Park – Southern Highlands Leading Luxury Hotel & Spa; Milton Park – Open Garden	1910	Temperate?
	Mirani	Walcha	NSW	ACWG No. 10	pp. 84–91	Private	The area around Mirani was bought by Abraham Nivison in 1839 as part of the "Ohio" run. Over 160 years later it is being run by his descendants, Hugh and Felicity Nivison.	1850s	Dry climate
"The best garden in the Highlands"	Moidart Nurseries	19–21 Eridge Park Road, Burradoo	NSW	PG No. 9	pp. 158–167	Private	Open Gardens: The best garden in the Highlands; Open Gardens – MOIDART, Burradoo;	1930s	Edwardian, arts and crafts
	Mount Wilson Gardens	Mount Wilson	NSW	GGA No. 10	pp. 90–99	Private	Mount Wilson, New South Wales – Wikipedia; Historic Mt Wilson & Mt Irvine;		Cool climate
	Nooroo	11–15 Church Lane, Mount Wilson	NSW	PGA No. 9 ABGG TGGA	pp. 52–57, pp. 109–116 p. 26–29	Private	Nooroo – Mt Wilson; Photo Gallery Nooroo – Mt Wilson;	1880	Temperate, formal, English
	Old Government House	Parramatta Park	NSW	RGA No. 29	p. 184	Public	Old Government House | National Trust; Old Government House, Parramatta – Wikipedia; Old Government House; MGNSW – Old Government House of NSW;		Roses, labour
Old Government House Old Government House Old Government House Government House Parramatta 1805 Government House Parramatta 1903 Old Government House - Parramatta Park Old Government House - Parramatta Park Old Government House - Parramatta Park Old Government House - Parramatta Park
	Rose Garden at Orange Church, (ex-Shadforth)	Orange Botanic Gardens, 1 Yellow Box Way, Orange	NSW	RGA No. 30	pp. 185–186	Public	Botanic Gardens – Orange City Council; Orange Botanic Gardens – Orange Attraction – Visit NSW; Orange Botanic Gardens – Facebook;		Roses, labour
Cook Park in Orange, New South Wales Gate at the corner of Summer Street and Clinton Street to Cook Park at Orange, New South Wales Bandstand in Orange's Cook Park. Cook Park 2008 Autumn trees in Byng St, Orange NSW Henry Parkes Arts Centre Orange NSW
	Pejar Park	Woodhouselee, Crookwell	NSW	USACG No. 20	pp. 129–134	Private	Renowned garden lecturer and historian Beatrice Bligh (1916–1973);	1940s	Champion Homestead Garden
	Philippa Thompson's Garden	Bathurst	NSW	ACWG #7	pp. 60–67	Private	Paul Sorensen;	1982, 1985 Heritage Rose Conference	Paul Sorensen
	Pomeroy Station	2215 Range Road, Bannister	NSW	ACG No. 18	pp. 124–129	Private	Ina Atkins; (Australian Country magazine)	1840s	Cool climate
	Possumwood	Robertson	NSW	RAG No. 4	pp. 70–83	Private	Possumwood – The Garden Clinic; Change of direction – Garden Life		Cool climate
	Prittlewell	Bodycotts Lane, Fitzroy Falls	NSW	ACG No. 20	pp. 136–141	Private	'Prittlewell' an amazing country estate on 29 acres; Property developer Tim Copes offers up his dream home – Domain; Operculum – Southern Highlands Botanic Gardens;		Cool climate
One of the world's best gardens	Red Cow Farm	Illawarra Highway, Sutton Forest	NSW	RGA	pp. 86–94	Private	Ali Mentesh is part owner and designer of reputably one of the world's best gardens, Red Cow Farm; TripAdvisor Reviews; Monastery Garden – Burke's Backyard; Eat, drink+be Kerry A gardener's delight – Red Cow Farm; Red Cow Farm garden – Garden Drum;	1820s, 1992	Roses, highlands
	Redbrow Garden Guesthouse	1143 Nanima Road, Murrumbateman	NSW	ACG No. 23	pp. 152–157	Private	David and Elisabeth Judge; Eight years of drought; Homepage: Redbrow Garden – Canberra Bed and Breakfast;		
One of Australia's finest gardens	Retford Park	Bowral	NSW	GGA No. 9	pp. 86–91	Public	"Retford Park" – One of Australia's finest gardens; James Fairfax has gifted his Retford Park in the Southern Highlands to the NSW National Trust;	1887	Cool climate garden estate
	Robinwood	42 Oxley Drive, Bowral	NSW	TGGA No. 48	pp. 116–117	Private	Sale and photos; Roll in Tulip Time;		
	Rona	2 Ginahgulla Road, Bellevue Hill	NSW	PG No. 4	pp. 90–103	Private	Rona renaissance; Rona, Bellevue Hill – Wikipedia; Rona Sale Video;		Victorian, gardenesque
Rona, Bellevue Hill Rona, Bellevue Hill Rona Caretaker's cottage, Rona, Bellevue Hill Rona, Bellevue Hill Rona Gatehouse, Bellevue Hill
	Rumsey Rose Garden	Parramatta Park	NSW	Web		Public	Rumsey Rose Garden and Murray Gardens; Rumsey Rose Garden, Parramatta Park – Facebook; Parramatta Park and Old Government House | NSW Environment; Parramatta Park – Discover Parramatta; NSW Heritage: Parramatta Park and Old Government House;	1857	Roses
	Sam's Way	Bell's Line of Road, Bilpin	NSW	TGGA No. 40	p. 96	Public	Sams Way, Mountain Lagoon; A beautiful walk along a quiet country lane, magnificent colours in Autumn. Kurrajong DISCOVERY TRAIL;		Cool climate
	Sefton Cottage	21 Church Lane, Mount Wilson	NSW	TGGA No. 20	p. 55	Private	Sefton Cottage – Mt Wilson; Mw018 : Sefton Cottage – NSW Environment & Heritage;		Cool climate
	Springfield	Braidwood Road, Tirrannaville	NSW	GGA	pp. 70–73	Private	NSW Heritage: Springfield Homestead, Outbuildings, Gardens; Station Collection; Springfield estate group; History: lock, stock and barrel – National – smh.com.au; The (amazing) Springfield collection – National Museum of Australia; – Biography – William Pitt Faithfull;	1828, Property sold 2006	Dry climate
Old Rose Garden	St Aubins	St Aubins Road, Scone	NSW	RGA	pp. 49–52	Private	St Aubins House St Aubins Road Scone, NSW – Aust Heritage;	1887–1890	Roses, walled
(Indicative photo)	St Kevin's	117 Queen Street, Woollahra	NSW	ABGG No. 38	pp. 223–226	Private	Queen Anne style; Paul Keating; Arts director Leo Schofield; Photos; Keatings to quit Woollahra home (2005); Keating staying at St Kevins (2007); Long live the queen! Queen Victoria's Queen Street, Woollahra; Woollahra Style Suburb of Sydney;	1892, 1976	Warm climate, federation garden
	The Sisters of Mercy	Sacred Spaces, 30 Queen Street, Singleton	NSW	RGA No. 32	pp. 190–192	Public	Sacred Spaces Singleton;		Roses, wine
	Vaucluse House	69A Wentworth Road, Vaucluse	NSW	TGGA No. 37	pp. 90–92	Public	Vaucluse House – Sydney Living Museums; Vaucluse House – Wikipedia; Vaucluse House Tearooms: Home;		
'Vaucluse House' - RAHS-Osborne Collection c. 1930 Vaucluse House, Vaucluse, Sydney circa 1987 Vaucluse House, Vaucluse, Sydney circa 1987 Vaucluse House, Vaucluse, Sydney circa 1987 Vaucluse House, Sydney 2009
	Wanna Wanna Homestead	149 Wanna Wanna Road, Carwoola	NSW	RAG No. 6	pp. 101–115	Private	Open Garden at Wanna Wanna Homestead; NSW Heritage – Wanna Wanna Homestead, Garden and Outbuildings Group;		Roses, perennials, lake
	Wattle Ridge	700 Wattle Ridge Road, Wattle Ridge	NSW	RAG	pp. 228–239	Private	Wattle Ridge-Welcome;	1998	Paul Bangay
	Wildes Meadow	'The Katon House', Wildes Meadow	NSW	RAG No. 12	pp. 186–197	Private	‘The Katon House’, Wildes Meadow;	2011	Minimalist
	Wildwood	29 Powells Road, Bilpin	NSW	ACG No. 22	pp. 146–151	Private	Wayne and Sue Tapping; Wildwood Garden Imagery – Wildwood Garden;	1980	Formal, wild
(Indicative)	Winter Hill (Tree Farm)	2233 Canyonleigh Road, Canyonleigh	NSW	ACG No. 2	pp. 18–25	Private	Winter Hill Tree Farm;	1994	Arboretum
(Indicative)	Wisteria Gardens	Parramatta Psychiatric Centre, 5 Fleet Street, Parramatta	NSW	ABGG No. 43 TGGA	pp. 243–248 pp. 136–139	Public	Cumberland District Hospital Group – NSW Environment & Heritage; Blooming Wisteria spring festival – WSLHD – NSW Govt.; Take a walk among the wisteria; GALLERY: Wisteria Gardens in full bloom – Parramatta Sun; A Vision For North Parramatta – National Trust;		Warm climate
	Withycombe (Beowang)	1–9 Church Lane, Mount Wilson	NSW	TGGA No. 36	p. 89	Private	Withycombe – Landsberg Gardens; The Whites in Mt Wilson; Mw017 : Withycombe – NSW Environment & Heritage;	1920s	Exotic trees (White family)
	Woomargama	Woomargama Way, Woomargama	NSW	RGA No. 24 GGA RAG	p. 157–159 pp. 188–189 pp. 28–43	Private	Woomargama Station – Facebook; Woomargama – Wikipedia; Royal Visits: Charles and Diana; William and Kate with baby George;	1881	Grey, knot, roses, grace, Guilfoyle, perennials, haha,
(Indicative)	Wyldefel Gardens	8A Wylde Street, Potts Point	NSW	PG No. 13	pp. 216–227	Public	Radical Terrace — Wyldefel Gardens; Wyldefel Gardens streamline moderne;	1930s	Art Deco, modernist
	Wynstay	68–78 The Avenue, Mount Wilson	NSW	TGGA No. 68	p. 163	Private	Wynstay – Mt Wilson; Gardens – Mt Wilson; Wynstay Estate – NSW Environment & Heritage; Turkish Bath Museum;	1893	
"One of 'world's most beautiful gardens"	Yarrawa	Region Street, Burrawang	NSW	ACG No. 15	pp. 106–113	Private	Bruce Rosenberg, retired stockbroker; Burrawang garden one of 'world's most beautiful' – Southern Highlands; Less is more delight – The Australian;	1994	Regularly open to visitors
	Yengo Sculpture Garden	Queens Avenue, Mount Wilson	NSW	TGGA No. 25	pp. 66–67	Private	Yengo Sculpture Gardens – Mt Wilson; Gardens – Mt Wilson; Blue Mountains Open Gardens – Blue Mountains Australia		

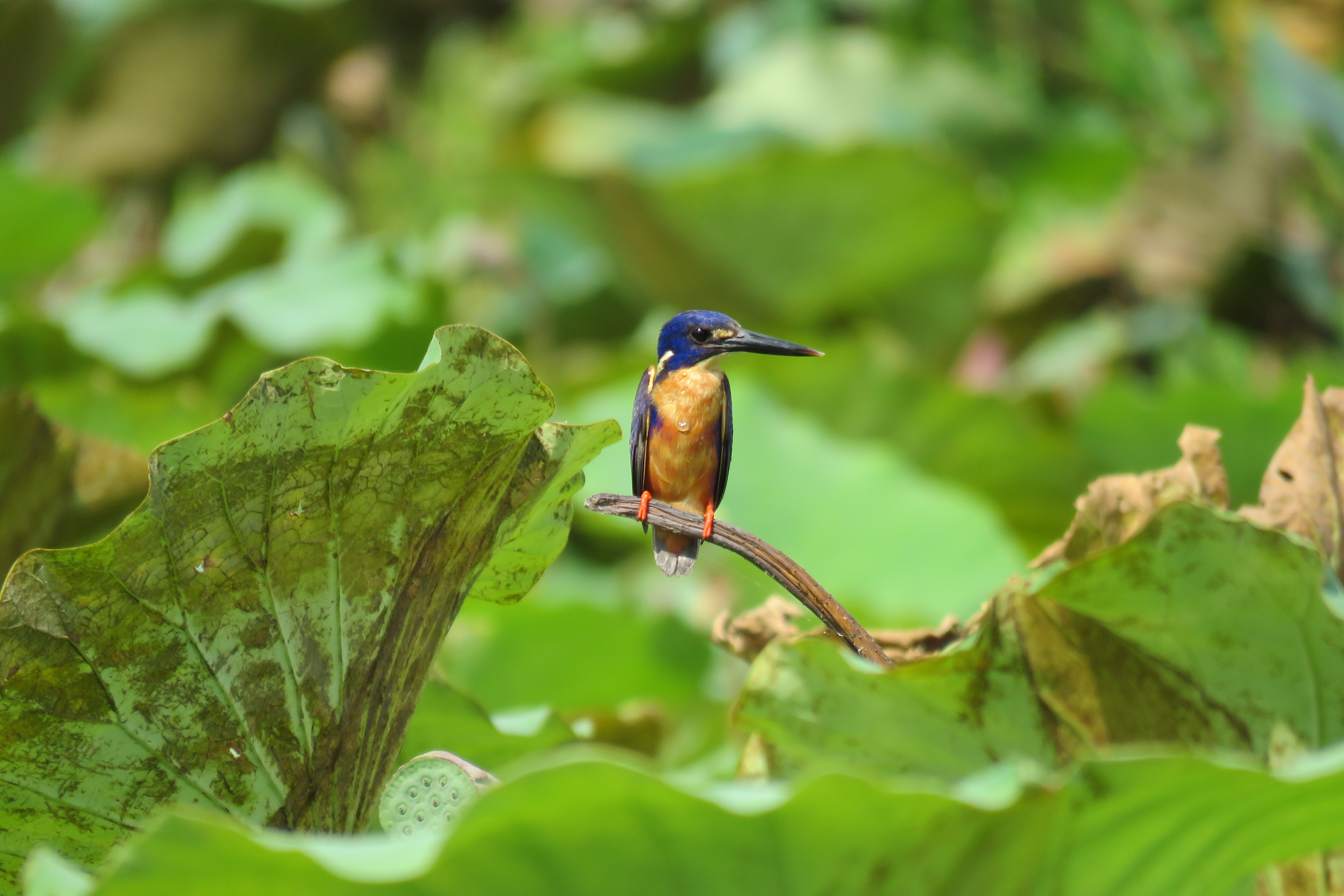
Azure kingfisher (Alcedo azurea) on the South Alligator River in Kakadu (NT) 2015

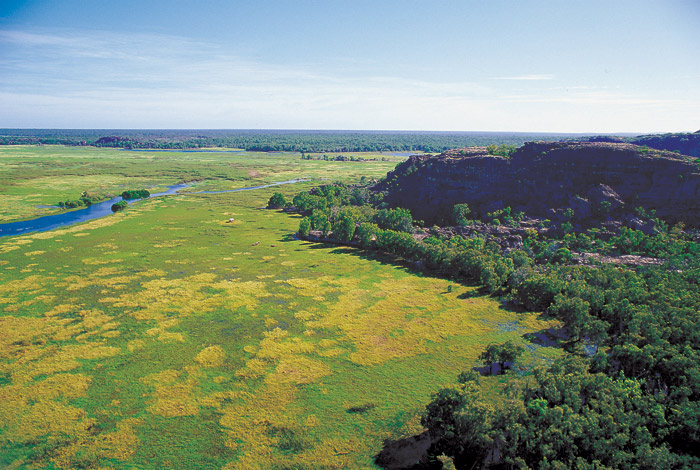
Aerial view of Mount Borradail, Kakadu National Park 2007 Tourism NT

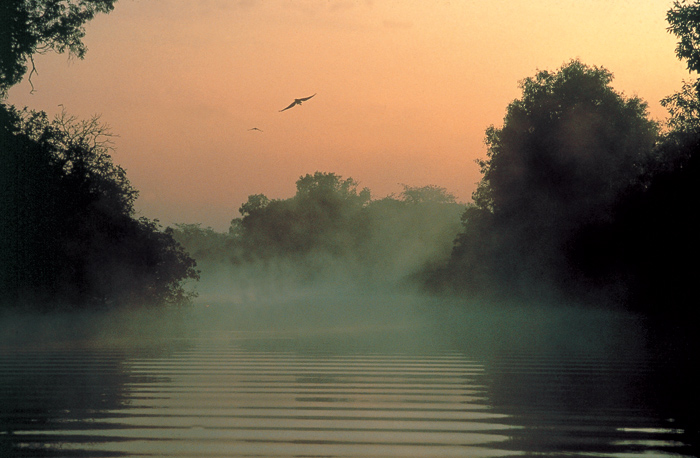
Mist at Yellow Water billabong – Kakadu National Park 2007 Tourism NT

== Heritage Gardens in the Northern Territory ==
ID	Name	Address	State	Source code	Source detail	Access	References	Year	Style
Darwin Botanic Gardens	George Brown Darwin Botanic Gardens	The Gardens Darwin NT 0820	NT	TGGA No. 67	p. 162	Public	George Brown Darwin Botanic Gardens – NT.GOV.AU; George Brown Darwin Botanic Gardens;		
Darwin Botanic Gardens Fountain in the George Brown Darwin Botanic Gardens Rainforest gully, Darwin Botanic Gardens Rainforest gully, Darwin Botanic Gardens Darwin Botanic Gardens
	Elsey Station	1 Roper Terrace, Mataranka NT 0852	NT	USACG No. 11	pp. 67–72	Private	Jeannie Gunn (1870–1961); Elsey Station – Wikipedia; Elsey Station Northern Territory; Old Elsey Station; "We of the Never Never"	1905	
Kakadu National Park entrance sign	Wild Garden at the Top End	Kakadu National Park, Kakadu Hwy, Jabiru NT 0886	NT	ABGG	pp. 283–288	Public	Kakadu National Park – Parks Australia; Welcome to Kakadu National Park;		Warm climate
Kakadu Escarpment 2007 Kakadu seasonal calendar, Kakadu National Park 2012 Nourlangie Rock 2007 Tourism NT Kakadu, Rock Art 2012 Kakadu, Safety sign 2012 Kakadu National Park 2015 Jabiru - Kakadu National Park Tourism NT Salt water crocodile - Kakadu National Park 2007 Tourism NT Waterlilies - Lotus Flower - Kakadu National Park 2007 Waterfall - Kakadu National Park 2007 Tourism NT Green Pygmy Goose in Kakadu National Park by Duncan Wright 2015 Spectacular natural infinity pool at the top of Gunlom Falls Kakadu 2015

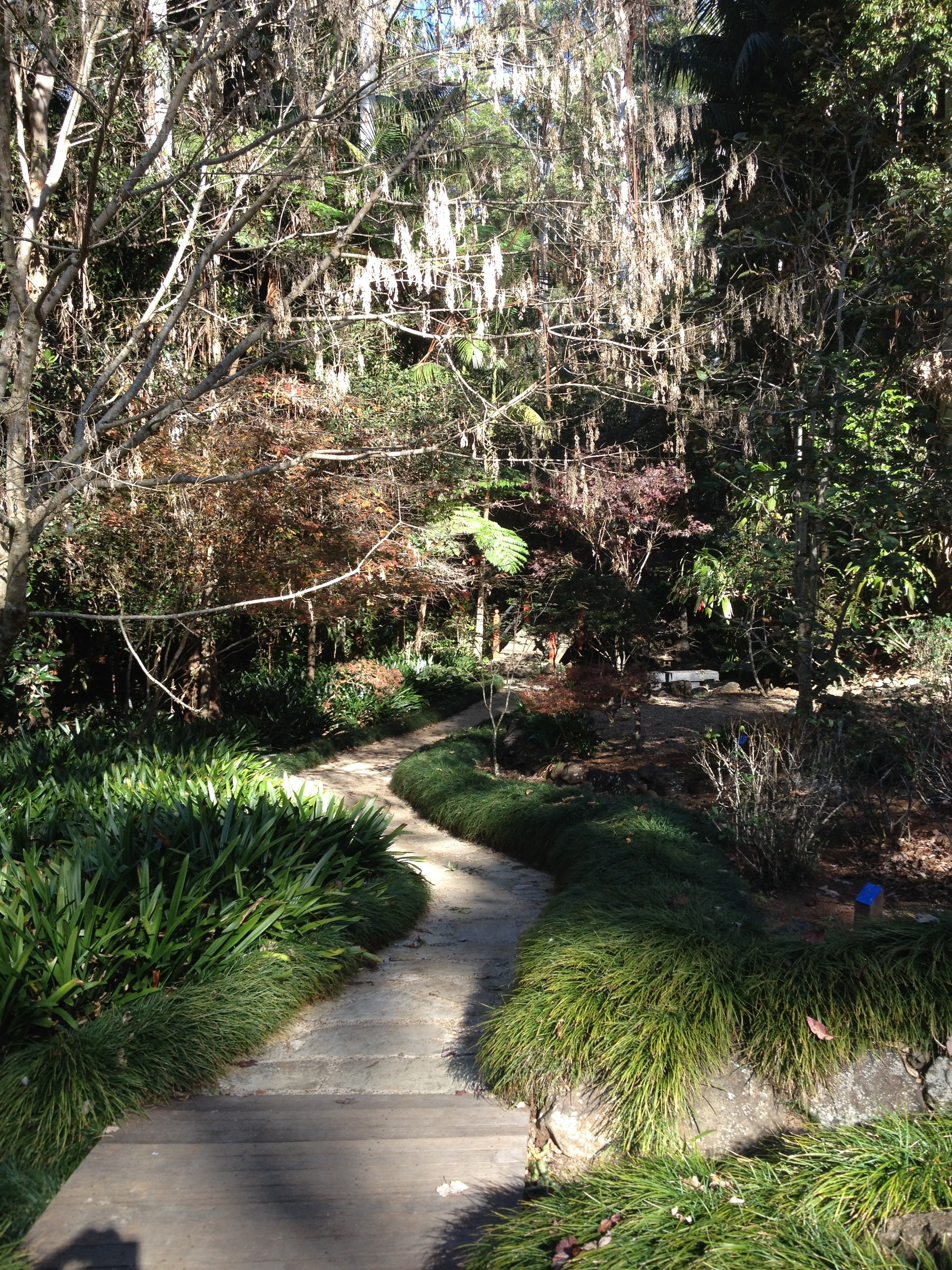
Tamborine Mountain Botanic Gardens, Tamborine Mountain, Queensland, May 2014

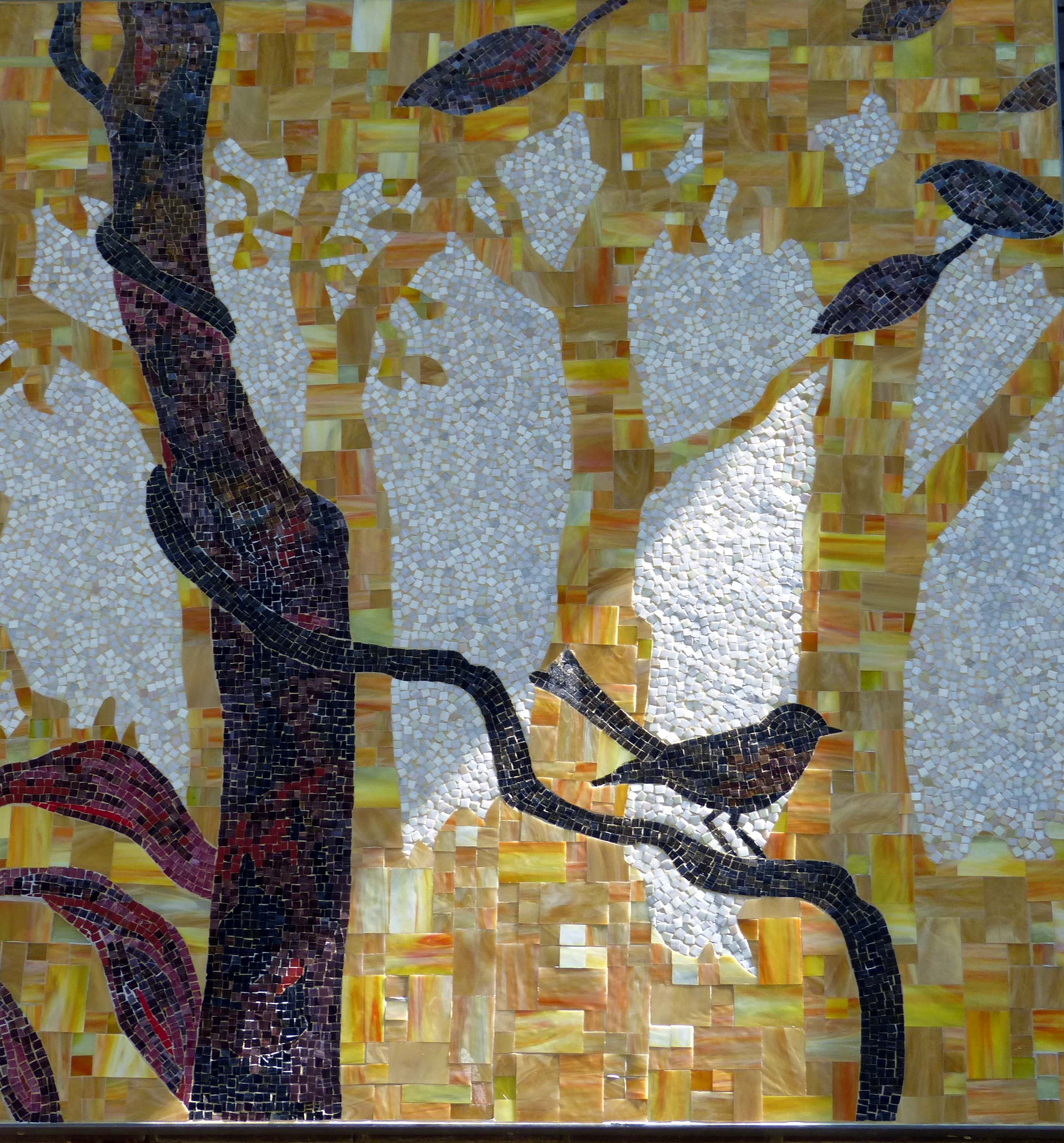
Mt. Coot-tha Botanic garden mosaic

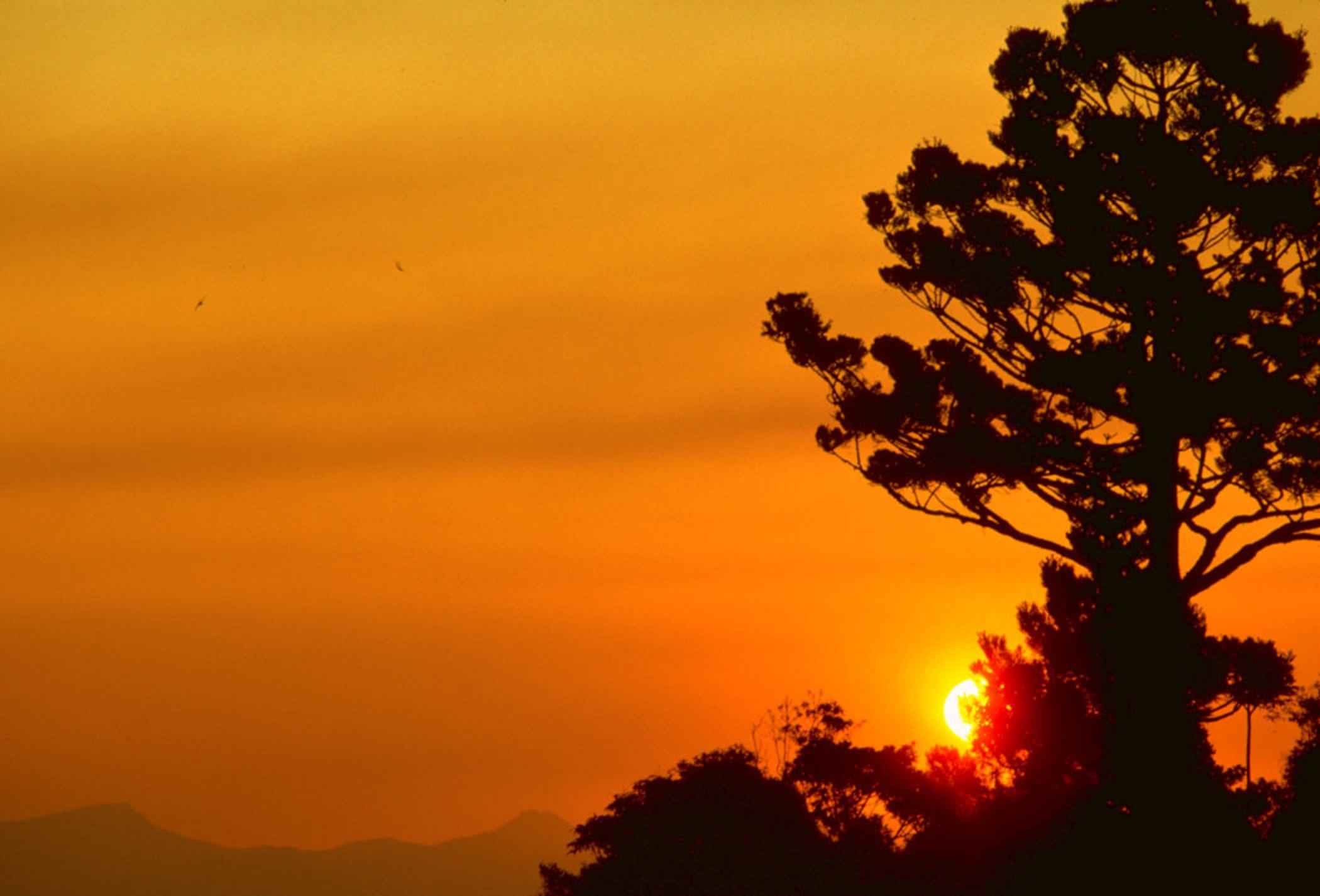
Lamington national park sunset

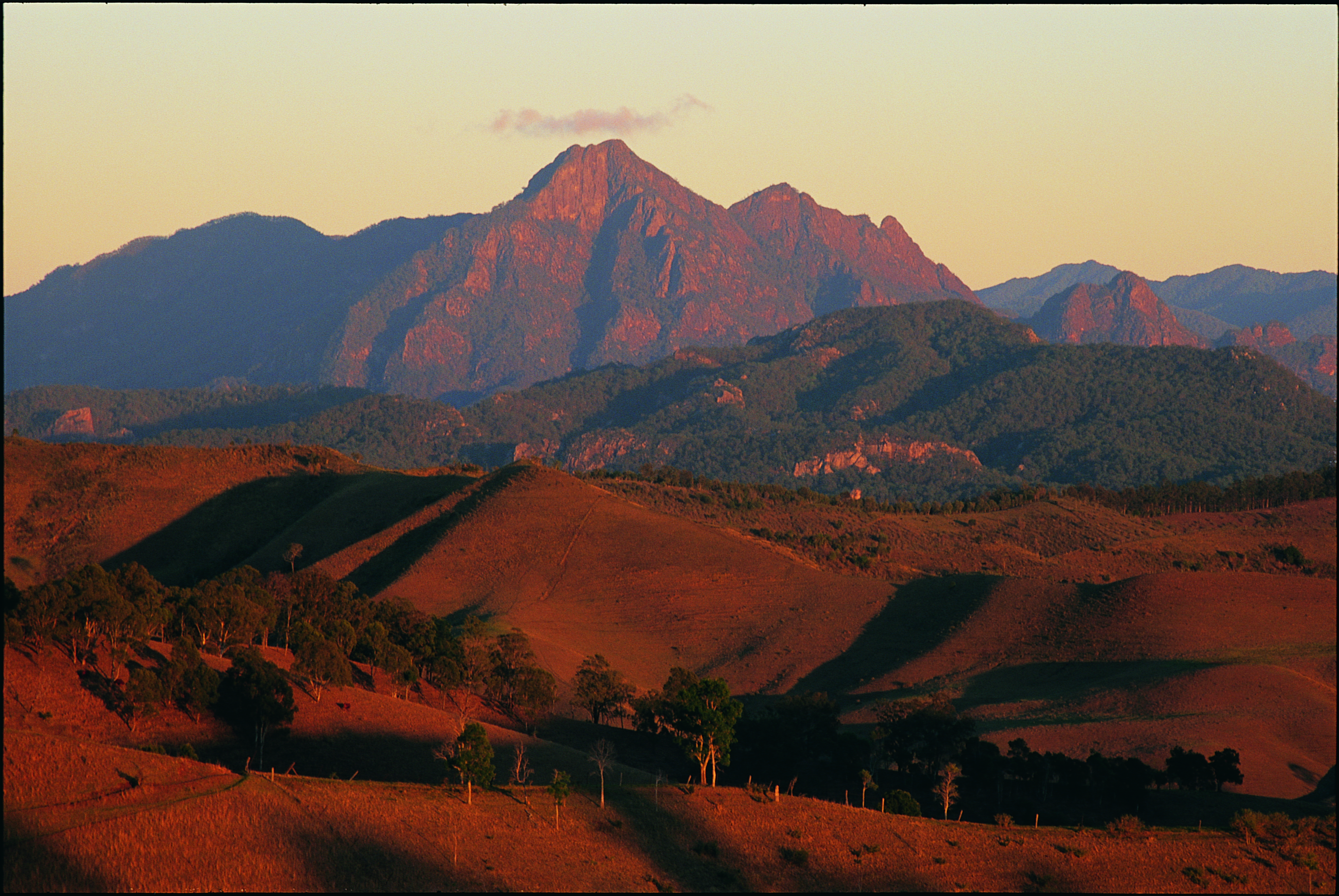
Gondwana Rainforests of Australia World Heritage 2005

== Heritage gardens of Queensland ==
ID	Name	Address	State	Source code	Source detail	Access	References	Year	Style
Brisbane City Botanic Gardens	Botanic Gardens	Alice St, Brisbane City QLD 4000	QLD	TGGA No. 14	pp. 42–43	Public	City Botanic Gardens;		
Canning Downs Homestead (2011)	Canning Downs	Junabee Road Warwick Qld 4370	QLD	USACG No. 6	pp. 33–38	Private	Edna Walling (1895–1973); Canning Downs; Canning Downs – Wikipedia;	1840	
Main gates and gatekeeper's residence, Canning Downs Station, c. 1875 Homestead at Canning Downs Station, c. 1875 Canning Downs Station near Warwick 4 May 1894 Canning Downs station homestead and gardens, Warwick district, 1914 Canning Downs station homestead, Warwick district, 1938 Fountain and lily pond in the garden at Canning Downs station, Warwick district, 1938
Gold Coast Regional Botanic Gardens	Cascade Water Gardens	Gold Coast	QLD	TGGA No. 9	pp. 34–35	Public	City of Gold Coast – Cascade Gardens;		
Currimundi Beach	Currimundi	Sunshine Coast	QLD	ACGM No. 16	pp. 240–253	Private			Coastal
	Dr and Mrs L.A. Boyce's Garden	6 Range Street, Mount Lofty, Toowoomba QLD	QLD	TGGA No. 53	p. 123	Private	Boyce Gardens, The University of Queensland; Boyce Gardens – Wikipedia; University of Queensland Boyce Estate Gardens – Toowoomba; Boyce Gardens – Environment, land and water – Queensland;		
	Franklyn Vale	Franklin Vale Road,(Grandchester) Mount Mort, City of Ipswich, Queensland	QLD	USACG No. 12	pp. 73–80	Private	Eirene Mort artist (1879–1977); Franklyn Vale Homestead – Environment, land and water- QLD; Franklyn Vale Homestead – Wikipedia; Historical Facts Grandchester and District;	1870s	
Franklyn Vale Homestead Franklyn Vale Homestead (1992) Solar panels at Franklyn Vale Homestead Mount Mort
Government House, Brisbane, 1875	Government House	168 Fernberg Road, Paddington, Brisbane QLD 4064	QLD	TGGA No. 65	pp. 154–157	Private	Government House, Brisbane – Wikipedia; Old Government House, Queensland – Wikipedia;		
	Gracemere Homestead	234 Gracemere Road, Gracemere, Rockhampton Region,	QLD	USACG	pp. 95–100	Private	The Archer Family at Rockhampton; History of Rockhampton and Gracemere; Gracemere Homestead – Wikipedia; Gracemere Homestead – Queensland; Visiting Gracemere;	1874	Sub-tropical
Archer family having tea on the lawn at Gracemere On the front steps of the homestead at Gracemere, c. 1872 Gracemere homestead near Rockhampton Verandah of Gracemere Homestead
	Jimbour Station Homestead	86 Jimbour Station Road, Jimbour QLD 4406, near Dalby	QLD	ACWG No. 2	pp. 22–27	Private	Jimbour Heritage Registered on the National Estate; Jimbour – Jimbour House; http://jimbour.com/index.php/food-and-wine/jimbour-wines/;		Opera at Jimbour
Jimbour House - Outside - Garden View Jimbour - Garden View Jimbour - Garden View Jimbour House - Aerial View Jimbour House Garden: Water Fountain
Portrait of shearers as Unionist Prisoners after the shearers strike in Barcaldine Queensland 1893	Kyneton Station	Barcaldine, Central Western Qld	QLD	ACG No. 3	pp. 26–33	Private	A GARDEN IN THE OUTBACK – Australia Country Magazine; Joceyln Chandler stands next to a tree she planted in the early 1980s; 35 years building a green cocoon on an outback Queensland cattle;	1980s	Oasis
	Leander Homestead	Scotty Creek, Longreach	QLD	RAG No. 2	pp. 44–55	Private	Map of Leander in Queensland	1915	Tropical, shade trees
Manutara Garden	Manutara	Cairns	QLD	PGA	pp. 14–17	Private	N/A		Tropical
Mount Abundance Station, Queensland, ca. 1877	Mt Abundance Homestead	Warrego Highway, Bungeworgorai, Maranoa Region, via Roma Queensland	QLD	USACG No. 19.	pp. 123–128	Private	Ludwig Leichhardt (1813–1848?); Ludwig Leichhardt – Wikipedia; Mount Abundance Homestead – Wikipedia; Mount Abundance Homestead – QLD Heritage; Leichhardt Land – Mt Abundance;	1856	
Ludwig Leichhardt Ludwig Leichhardt expedition to Port Essington Mount Abundance Station, c. 1880 Mount Abundance, c. 1896 Drafting yards at Mt. Abundance Station, c. 1910 Buildings at Mount Abundance Station, c. 1929 Christmas card from Mount Abundance Station, c. 1898
	Mt Coot-tha Botanical Gardens	Mount Coot-Tha Rd, Toowong QLD 4066	QLD	ABGG No. 49	pp. 269–272	Public	Brisbane Botanic Gardens Mt Coot-tha; Brisbane Botanic Gardens – Mt-Coot-tha;		Warm climate
Mt. Coot-tha Botanic garden Mt. Coot-tha Botanic garden mosaic Mt Coot-tha Botanic Gardens, 1976 New Mt Coot-tha Botanic Gardens, 1976 Mt Coot-tha Botanic Gardens Mt Coot-tha Botanic Gardens Mt Coot-tha Botanic Gardens Mt Coot-tha Botanic Gardens Mt Coot-tha Botanic Gardens Mt Coot-tha Botanic Gardens Mt Coot-tha Botanic Gardens
Garden at Nindooimbah House	Nindooimbah House	Nindooinbah House Road, Beaudesert, QLD	QLD	ACWG No. 1	pp. 14–21	Private	Margaret & Patrick Hockey;	1906, 2005	Japanese, Edwardian
Gardens of Nindooinbah House	Nindooinbah	Nindooinbah Connection Rd, Nindooinbah QLD 4285	QLD	PGA No. 4	pp. 27–31	Private	Heritage Registered on the National Estate;Nindooinbah Homestead History and Events; The New Black – Landline – ABC; Nindooinbah: Queensland Season Launch for Open Gardens Australia;	2005	
Garden, Nindooinbah Station, c. 1924 Cattle on Nindooinbah Station, 1871 Nindooinbah Station homestead, 1872 Homestead at Nindooinbah Station, c. 1908
Garden at Airlie Beach	North Queensland Garden	Airlie Beach	QLD	ABGG No. 42	pp. 239–242	Private	Mrs Jenkins		Warm climate
	Garden at Old Schoolhouse	1170 Maleny-Stanley River Road, Maleny, Sunshine Coast	QLD	RAG	pp. 128–141	Private	Old Schoolhouse – ABC; Sale and Photos; Maleny estate will enchant;	1986	Perennials, water garden, Grand Champion × 2
Pioneer Sugar Mill	Pioneer Sugar Mill Plantation	Brandon	QLD	GGA No. 13	pp. 114–117	Private			
Sugar tramline near Pioneer River, west of MacKay Pioneer River at the Marian Sugar Mill in the Mackay district, circa 1915 Two South Sea Islanders from the Pioneer Sugar Mill, Brandon, Queensland, 1880s Pioneer Sugar Mill in Mackay Pioneer sugar mill at Brandon in the 1880s
Mixed sclerophyll and rainforest, Lamington National Park	Queensland Bush Garden	Green Mountains Botanical Gardens, Lamington National Park	QLD	ABGG No. 47	pp. 259–262	Public	Lamington National Park, Green Mountains Section; Gondwana Rainforests of Australia World Heritage Area;	1966	Warm climate
Orange Blossom Orchid (Sarcochilus falcatus) Mount Barney sunrise near Lamington National Park, Queensland Lamington national park sunset Lamington National Park Bushwalking Creek in Lamington National Park
Rainforest Garden	Rainforest Garden	Bingil Bay	QLD	PGA No. 2	pp. 18–22	Private	N/A		Rainforest
Rosedale Garden	Rosedale	Samford Valley, Queensland Hills	QLD	ACG	pp. 70–77	Private			
Tamborine Mountain Botanic Gardens	Tamborine Mountain Botanic Gardens	Forsythia Drive, Tamborine Mountain QLD 4272	QLD	ABGG No. 40	pp. 231–234	Public Private	Garden replaced by the Public Garden listing – Tamborine Mountain Botanic Gardens		Warm climate
Entrance, Tamborine Mountain Botanic Gardens Tamborine Mountain Botanic Gardens Tamborine Mountain Botanic Gardens Tamborine Mountain Botanic Gardens Path, Tamborine Mountain Botanic Gardens Walkway, Tamborine Mountain Botanic Gardens Bridge, Tamborine Mountain Botanic Gardens Run-off, Tamborine Mountain Botanic Gardens Lake, Tamborine Mountain Botanic Gardens Palms, Tamborine Mountain Botanic Gardens
Garden at Toowoomba, city of flowers	Toowoomba Garden		QLD	ABGG	pp. 249–250	Private	Dennis Hill		Warm climate

== Heritage gardens in South Australia ==
ID	Name	Address	State	Source code	Source detail	Access	References	Year	Style
Garden at 3G's	3G's, The Light House at Second Valley	7 Seacove Crescent, Second Valley, SA, 5204	SA	ACGM No. 12	pp. 182–195	Private	3Gs, Fleurieu Coast – Visitor Information Centre; The Light House @ Second Valley, a Second Valley House		
Rose Garden at Al-Ru	Al-Ru Farm	1016 One Tree Hill Rd, Sampson Flat SA 5114	SA	RGA No. 36 ACWG	p. 211 pp. 128–135	Private	Ruth Irving; Al Ru Farm – Wedding Venue Adelaide – Premiere Wedding Venue; Al Ru Farm – Facebook; Al Ru Farm, One Tree Hill – Open Gardens SA Inc.;		Roses, future
Beechwood Garden	Beechwood	Snows Rd, Stirling	SA	ABGG No. 33	pp. 187–192	Private	Gardens of the Adelaide Hills; Beechwood a grand piece of Victoriana; Growing for a century, the ultimate grand garden; Beechwood Garden Open Day	'	Dry climate, botanic garden
Boat's End Garden	Boat's End Garden	191 Adelaide Place, Currency Creek	SA	RAG No. 17	pp. 256–269	Private	Boat's End, Currency Creek; Boat's End: A world class naturalistic garden; Boat's End – ABC	2004	Naturalistic
Carrick Hill	Carrick Hill	46 Carrick Hill Dr, Springfield SA 5062	SA	RGA	pp. 177–183	Public	Carrick Hill; Alister Clark rose garden; Trevor Nottle – Heritage Rose Society;		Roses, labour
Carrick Hill House Carrick Hill front view Carrick Hill Rose Garden Rill and garden at Carrick Hill, Springfield Avenue of conifer trees at the back of the house, Carrick Hill, Springfield
Casuarina Colourful Garden	Casuarina	Mylor	SA	RAG No. 10	pp. 158–171	Private	Casuarina, Mylor – Open Gardens; Casuarina Open Garden Mylor; Colourful Gardens Without Flowers	2000	Australian native garden
Coastal Garden	Copper Gone House	Moonta Bay	SA	ACGM	pp. 138–151	Private			Coastal
Garden at Coralfern	Coralfern	15 Boyle Swamp Road Mylor, SA 5153	SA	ABGG No. 28	pp. 167–170	Private	Sale and photos;		Dry climate
Ruston Rose Garden	David Ruston's Garden	Moorna Street, Renmark, S.A.	SA	RGA	pp. 35–44	Private	Ruston's Roses – Australia's Largest Rose Garden Australia's foremost Rosearian, David Ruston World's largest rose garden – ABC; David Ruston – A Life With Roses; Meet: Senator Anne Ruston, rose garden owner – The Garden Clinic;		Mecca for Rose Lovers
Adam Lindsay Gordon Cottage Garden	Dingley Dell	Dingley Dell Conservation Park, Dingley Dell Road, Port MacDonnell South Australia 5291	SA	USACG No. 9	pp. 55–60	Private	Adam Lindsay Gordon (1833–1870); Dingley Dell Cottage; Dingley Dell Conservation Park;	1864	
Adam Lindsay Gordon - Melbourne monument Statue of Adam Lindsay Gordon Adam Lindsay Gordon cottage The poems of Adam Lindsay Gordon Adam Lindsay Gordon monument, South Australia
Garden at Fawley	Fawley	Balhannah, near Stirling, Adelaide Hill	SA	RAG No. 5	pp. 84–100	Private	Sale & Photos; Visit to Fawley	2001	Perennials
Garden at Forest Lodge	Forest Lodge	19 Pine Street Stirling	SA	PGA GGA ABGG	pp. 184–189 pp. 108–113 pp. 199–204	Private	Federation-House – Adelaide Federation Heritage; Stirling home on heritage register; Walter Hervey Bagot (1880–1963)		Dry climate
The Garden on the Coastal Edge	Garden on the Edge	Cape Jervis	SA	ACGM No. 5	pp. 76–91	Private	Artist Winnie Pelz; Fleurieu gardens open to the public; Magazine interview with artist Winnie Pelz. – YouTube; Gardening on the edge – The Bliss Files;		Coastal
Lighthouse at Cape Jervis Cape St George Lighthouse, Jervis Bay Farmland at Cape Jarvis with Kangaroo Island in the background Sea Link Ferry SA
Heritage Garden	Hughes Park	Hughes Park Road, Watervale SA 5452 (Clare Valley)	SA	RGA No. 17	pp. 119–124	Private	Walter and Kaymaire Duncan. No longer an Open Garden – ([theheritagegarden.com.au/?page_id=2|Smelling roses])		Rose professionals
	Lindsay Park	Eden Valley Road, Angaston	SA	GGA	pp. 62–65	Private	Lindsay Park; Lindsay Park – Homestead Complex; Lindsay Park- Australia Heritage; Lindsay Park sold		Romantic with wisteria walks, deer park
Garden at Mt George	Mt George	Stirling	SA	PGA No. 32	pp. 179–183	Private	Mount George Conservation Park; Heyson Trail;		
Heritage Garden	Nurney House	126 – 133 Kingston Ave. North Adelaide; Rear at 232 – 246 Stanley Street North Adelaide SA	SA	GGA No. 21	pp. 152–153	Private	Listed on SA Heritage Register; Stanley Street Stroll; Photo;	1849	
Garden at Stirling	Panmure B&B	32 Sturt Valley Rd Stirling SA 5152.	SA	PGA No. 34	pp. 190–195	Private	Stirling Adelaide Hills; Stirling – South Australia;		
Stirling Main Street Stirling council park Stirling council war memorial Stirling Hotel
Historic Garden	The Cedars	Heysen Road, Hahndorf SA 5245	SA	USACG No. 21	pp. 135–142	Private	Nora Heysen artist (1911–2003); Heysen – The Cedars; Nora Heysen :: The Collection :: Art Gallery NSW	1912	
Rose Garden	The Laurels	2 Hutchinson Street, Mount Barker SA 5251	SA	RGA No. 18	pp. 124–128	Private	A retirement village, George Thomson, rose breeder		Rose professionals
Garden of Renown	The Sampson Garden	Glen Osmond	SA	RGA No. 16	pp. 113–117	Private	Kaye and Dennis Sampson		Terraced, roses, chance
Compact Garden	Tickle Tank	24 Hill Street Mount Barker	SA	ACG No. 6	pp. 48–53	Private	Tickle Tank – Facebook; Tickle Tank Open Garden – Adelaide – WeekendNotes; SA LIFE – Tickle Tank;Tickle Tank – Video; Tickle Tank Open Garden – Rosehips and Rhubarb; Tickle Tank – Burke's Backyard;		
Barossa Garden	Valley Girl, Barossan Benchmark	Koonunga Hill, Barossa Valley	SA	ACG No. 13	pp. 92–97	Private	Cherie Hausler, Damian Feuerherdt; scullerymade.org; Return journey to the beautiful Barossa – Adelaide Now – The Advertiser; My Houzz: Idyllic Hangout in the Barossa Valley; Homelife – Lovingly restored 160-year-old farmhouse in the Barossa ...; Scullery Made stirs Barossa flavours – Farm Online; A BAROSSA VALLEY GIRL – Australia Country Magazine;		
	Veale Gardens	Adelaide Parklands	SA	ABGG	pp. 151–154	Public	Veale Gardens		Dry climate
	Willyama	12 The Avenue, Medindie, SA 5081	SA	PGA No. 31	pp. 174–178	Private	Medindie Heritage; Historic 'Willyama'		
Garden at Woodsoak Wines	Woodsoak	9 Woolundry Road, Robe SA 5276	SA	ACWG No. 15	pp. 120–127	Private	The Woodsoak farming property has been in the Legoe family for over 60 years – Woodsoak Wines;		

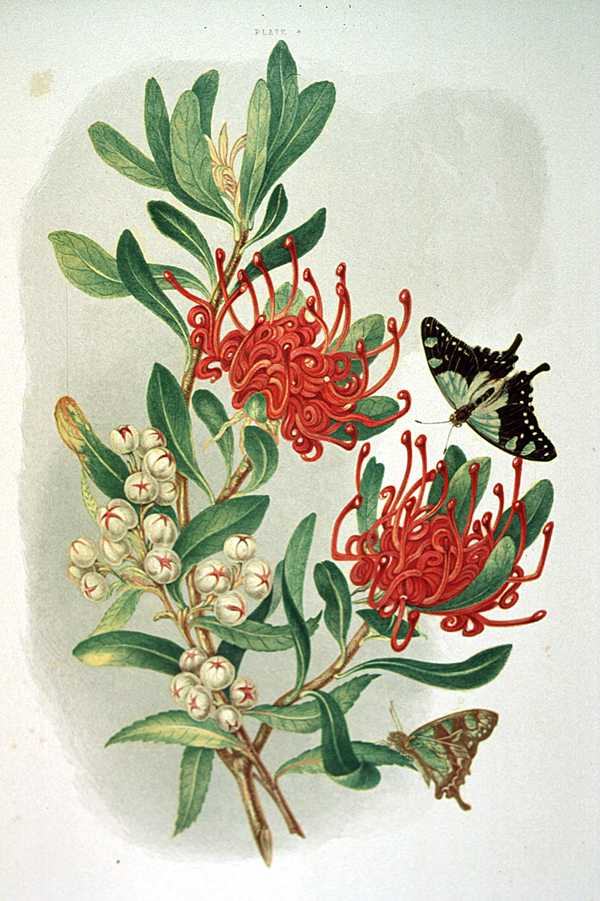
Louisa Anne Meredith (1812–1895) Born: Louisa Anne Twamley, Tasmanian poet and illustrator

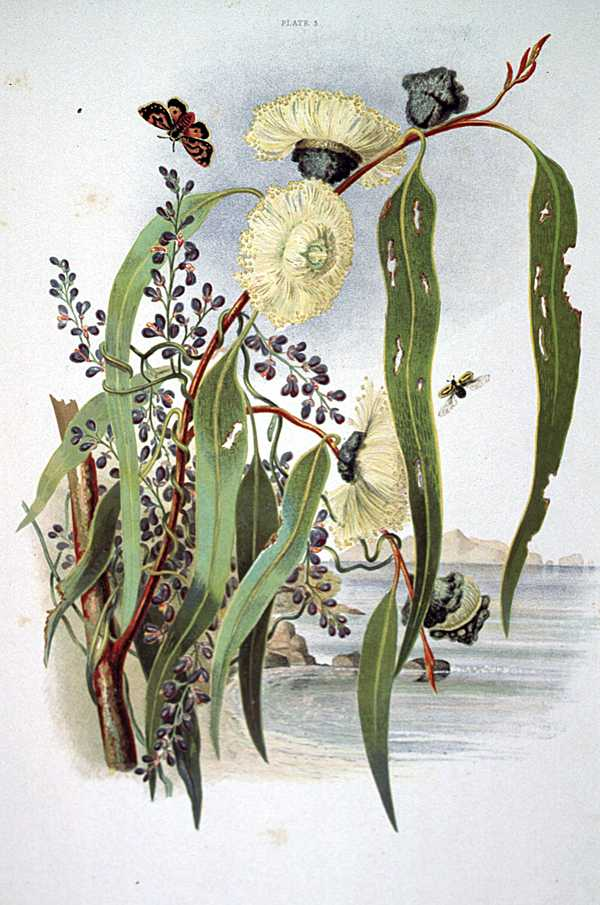
Louisa Anne Meredith (1812–1895) Tasmanian miniaturist, watercolourist, engraver, poet, writer and botanist

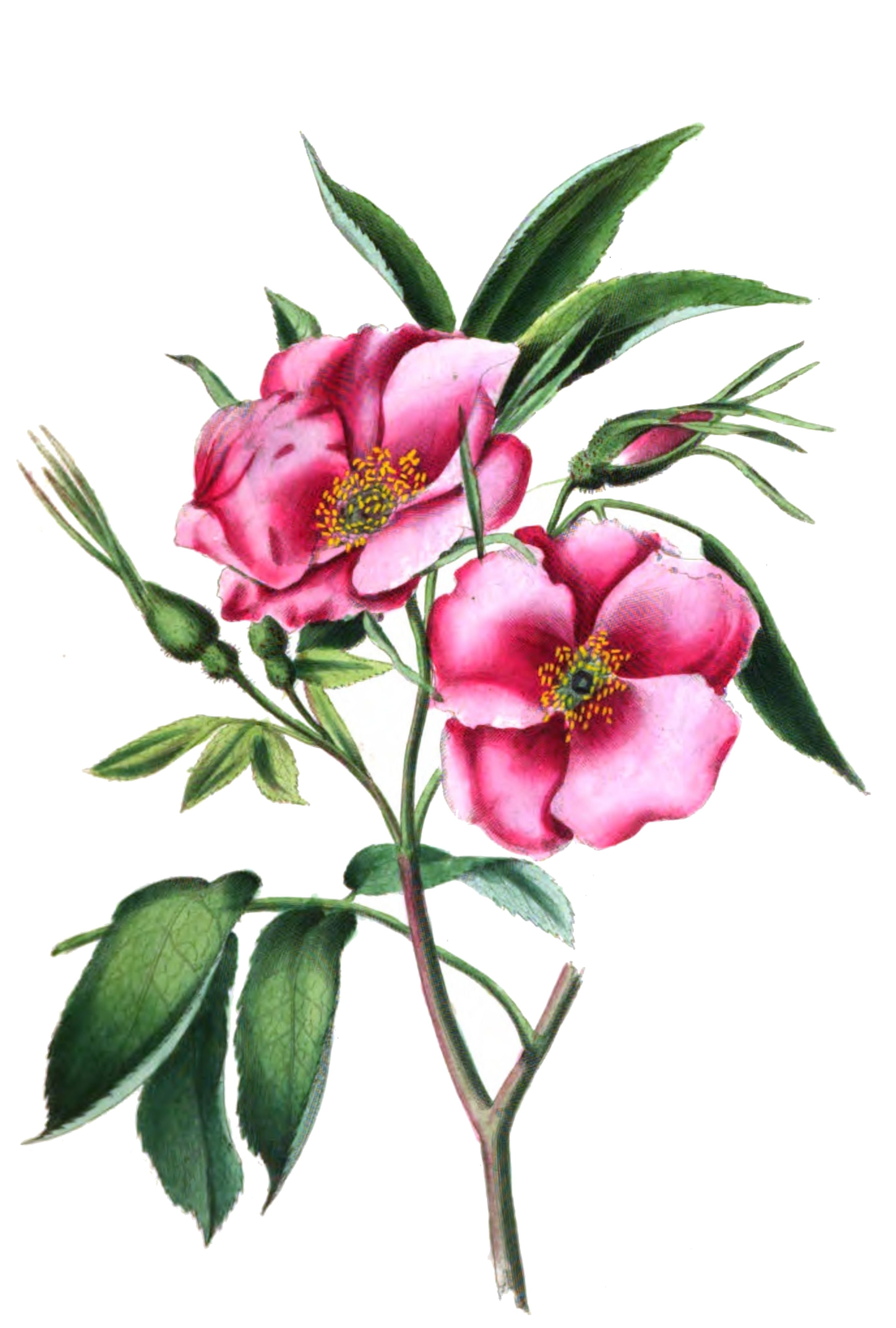
Louisa Anne Meredith (1812–1895) Tasmanian poet and illustrator

== Heritage gardens in Tasmania ==
ID	Name	Address	State	Source code	Source detail	Access	References	Year	Style
	Aurora Beach Cottage	31 Pedder Street, Seymour via Bicheno 7215	Tas	ACGM No. 14	pp. 212–225	Private	Aurora Beach Cottage; Aurora Beach Cottage, a Bicheno Cottage | Stayz; "Aurora Beach Cottage" Tasmania – Houses for Rent in Seymour ...; Aurora Beach Cottage – Discover Tasmania;		Coastal
Heritage Renovation	Beaufront	395 Tooms Lake Road, Ross	Tas	GGA	pp. 54 –57	Private	Beaufront – Country Houses; Beaufront – Organisation;		Typical 19th-century design
Historic Home	Bluegong	1226 Saundridge Road, Cressy 7302	Tas	ABGG	pp. 63–66	Private	n/a		Temperate
	Cambria	13566 Tasman Highway, Swansea	Tas	USACG No. 5	pp. 27–32	Private	Louisa Anne Meredith (1812–1895); John Meredith (1822–1909); Sale and photos; National Heritage: Cambria Homestead and Outbuildings; Spring Bay-Heritage of Cranbrook-C2. Cambria House and outbuildings, 13566 Tasman Highway Swansea TAS Read more about Cambria; More illustrations by Louisa Anne Meredith in Wikimedia;	1830s	
Meredith family Date 1866 Louisa Anne Meredith (1812–1895) at doorstep, circa 1860 Louisa Anne Meredith (1812–1895), c. 1850 Kangaroo Apple - Coloured lithographic print from "Bush friends in Tasmania" Date 1891 Blandfordia and Box by Louisa Anne Meredith (1812–1895) The Romance of Nature (#67) by Louisa Anne Meredith The Romance of Nature (#89) by Louisa Anne Meredith (1812–1895) The Romance of Nature (#46) by Louisa Anne Meredith (1812–1895) The Romance of Nature (#193) by Louisa Anne Meredith (1812–1895) The Romance of Nature (#149) by Louisa Anne Meredith (1812–1895)
Among the Best!	Culzean Gardens	Culzean William Street, Westbury 7303	Tas	ABGG	pp. 35–38	Private	Named after a Scottish Castle... Culzean; Described as among the best of Australian temperate climate gardens Culzean Gardens – Facebook;	1907	Temperate
	Dunedin, garden of Annabel Scott	Near Launceston, and Longford	Tas	ACWG No. 20	pp. 158–165	Private	Spring is in the air – The Examiner; Longford opens up to garden competition – The Examiner; Celebrating 25 years of Open Gardens Australia – ABC;		Sometimes open for charity
Rose Garden	Esk Farm	(formerly South Esk Cottage), Longford	Tas	RGA	pp. 110–112	Private	Richard, Sarah and Jo Johnston		Roses, trees
	Hawley House	68 Hawley Esplanade, Hawley Beach 7307	Tas	ACGM No. 8	pp. 122–137	Private	Hawley House, Devonport and Port Sorell Accommodation, Tasmania; Rooftop Bath – Hawley House; Hawley House, Heritage Boutique Hotel, Tasmania, Hawley Beach;		Coastal
	High Peak	Keira near Hobart	Tas	PGA No. 28	pp. 158–161	Private	Home of the Grant Family (built by Charles Henry Grant, described as 'pre-eminently a money making machine and successful speculator'; Federation House: High Peak, Keira Northern Architecture post High Peak; Sometimes the garden is open to visitors.		
Restored cottage garden	Judy's Cottages	Hamilton	Tas	RGA	pp. 79–85	Private	Judy Madden; On The Convict Trail: Hamilton Gaol & Warders Cottage; Hamilton's Cottage Collection also New Norfolk's Hamilton Cottages;		Roses, country
	Longford Hall	70 Malcombe Street, Longford	Tas	RGA No. 20	pp. 139–144	Private	Permanently Tasmanian Heritage Registered; Planted by Rose Falkiner; David Austin Roses		Roses, David Austin Roses
	Malahide	Mangana Road, Fingal	Tas	PGA No. 27 RGA No. 1.	pp. 152–157 pp. 9–16	Private	The lady of Malahide Castle; A tale of two Malahides; Talbot family	1976	Roses, Irish
	Mawhera (spelt as 'Mawherra')	2 Mawhera Ave, Sandy Bay 7005	Tas	ABGG No. 11	pp. 79–82	Private	Sale and Photos;		Temperate
	Noreen's Garden	Anstey Street, Longford	Tas	RGA No. 14	pp. 105–110	Private	Noreen Dennis		Roses, arches
	Panshanger	366 Panshanger Road, Longford	Tas	RAG No. 3 ACWG No. 19.	pp. 56–69 pp. 150–157	private	Panshanger Estate – Discover Tasmania; Panshanger Estate Accommodation – - Blooming Tasmania; Panshanger Estate Gardens – - Blooming Tasmania (Blooming Tasmania links are very slow)	1835	Park, borders
Driving Sheep at Panshanger Cottage Garden at Panshanger Gate at Panshanger Gatekeeper at Panshanger Woodland Garden at Panshanger
	Red Hill Farm	Deloraine	Tas	PGA No. 30	pp. 167–173	Private	Sale and photos;	1845	
	Red Hills House and Garden, listed as Red Hill Farm	615 Mole Creek Road, Red Hillsnear Deloraine	TAS	ACWG No. 21 RGA No. 13	pp. 166–171 pp. 89–92	Private	Sale and Photos;	1951	Temperate
	Richmond Hill	Richmond	Tas	RGA No. 21	pp. 144–148	Private	Pam Hutchins; David Austin Roses;		Roses, David Austin
	Royal Tasmanian Botanical Gardens	Queens Domain, Hobart	Tas	ABGG No. 1	pp. 23–30	Public	Royal Tasmanian Botanical Gardens; Royal Tasmanian Botanical Gardens – Discover Tasmania; Royal Tasmanian Botanical Gardens – Wikipedia;		Temperate
The Conservatory at the Royal Tasmanian Botanical Gardens The Conservatory, Royal Tasmanian Botanical Gardens The Conservatory, Royal Tasmanian Botanical Gardens The Conservatory, Royal Tasmanian Botanical Gardens Sub Antarctic Plant House, Royal Tasmanian Botanical Gardens Entrance to the Hobart botanical gardens. December 2007 Hobart Botanical Gardens - inside, December 2007 Female on Common Heath (Epacris impressa), Royal Tasmanian Botanical Gardens Acradenia frankliniae Hobart gardens 1 March 2012 ABC - Peter Cundall's vegetable patch, in the Hobart botanical gardens, 27 October 2016
	Symmons Plains Estate	15046 Midland Highway Perth 7300	Tas	RGA No. 26	pp. 166–167	Private	Youl family seat; Not owned by J.K.Rowling; Youl family – Wikipedia; Youl Family history; Symmons Plains on the market – The Examiner;		Roses, hybrid teas
	Valleyfield	Valleyfield Road, Epping Forest, near Campbell Town	Tas	RGA # 22. ACWG No. 17.	pp. 149–155	Private	Jenny Skerritt Taylor; on Macquarie River, near Campbell Town. White rose garden; "The centre of Van Diemen's Land's fine wool industry" Note: Original house destroyed in the past.		Roses, space
Open for public tour	Winton	Campbell Town	Tas	ACWG No. 18	pp. 144–149	Private	Book Title: Winton, Campbell Town; Campbell Town – The Interactive Tour of Tasmania Winton estate has well-preserved buildings and attractive gardens that are open for public tour, with highlights including the woolshed and original blacksmiths shop with bellows and forge.		Attractive gardens
	Woolmers	658 Woolmers Lane, Longford	Tas	GGA No. 2	pp. 58–61	Public	Woolmers Estate – Tasmanian National Heritage; Woolmers Estate; Rose Garden — Woolmers Estate; National Rose Garden at Woolmers – Discover Tasmania; YouTube:Rose festival at Woolmers Estate Longford Tasmania.		Victorian style
Longford-Woolmers, Whishaw Collection, Tasmanian Archive and Heritage Office Woolmers Estate, Longford, Tasmania, 4 January 2009 Woolmers Veranda, Longford, Tasmania, 4 January 2009
Magical Garden	Wychwood	80 Den Road, Mole Creek 7304	Tas	RAG No. 16	pp. 240–255	Public	Wychwood Garden & Nursery; Wychwood Garden and Nursery – Facebook; Tasmania's Wychwood garden; Wychwood: one of the world's most magical gardens; Youtube: Wychwood garden Autumn	1991	Magical!
Entering Wychwood Wychwood is the garden and nursery of Peter Cooper and Karen Hall. Garden at Wychwood Garden at Wychwood Oven at Wychwood Wychwood Propagation are Karen explains Wychwood Labyrinth at Wychwood Definitely Closed; But luckily it was opened up for the 25 of us Labyrinth at Wychwood Author brewbooks Sitting area above Labyrinth at Wychwood In 1991 we started transforming our 2 ½ acres of paddock into the garden we now call Wychwood. Entrance to Wychwood Sentinel of the Labyrinth at Wychwood encrusted with lichen" Labyrinth at Wychwood

== Heritage and renowned gardens in Victoria ==
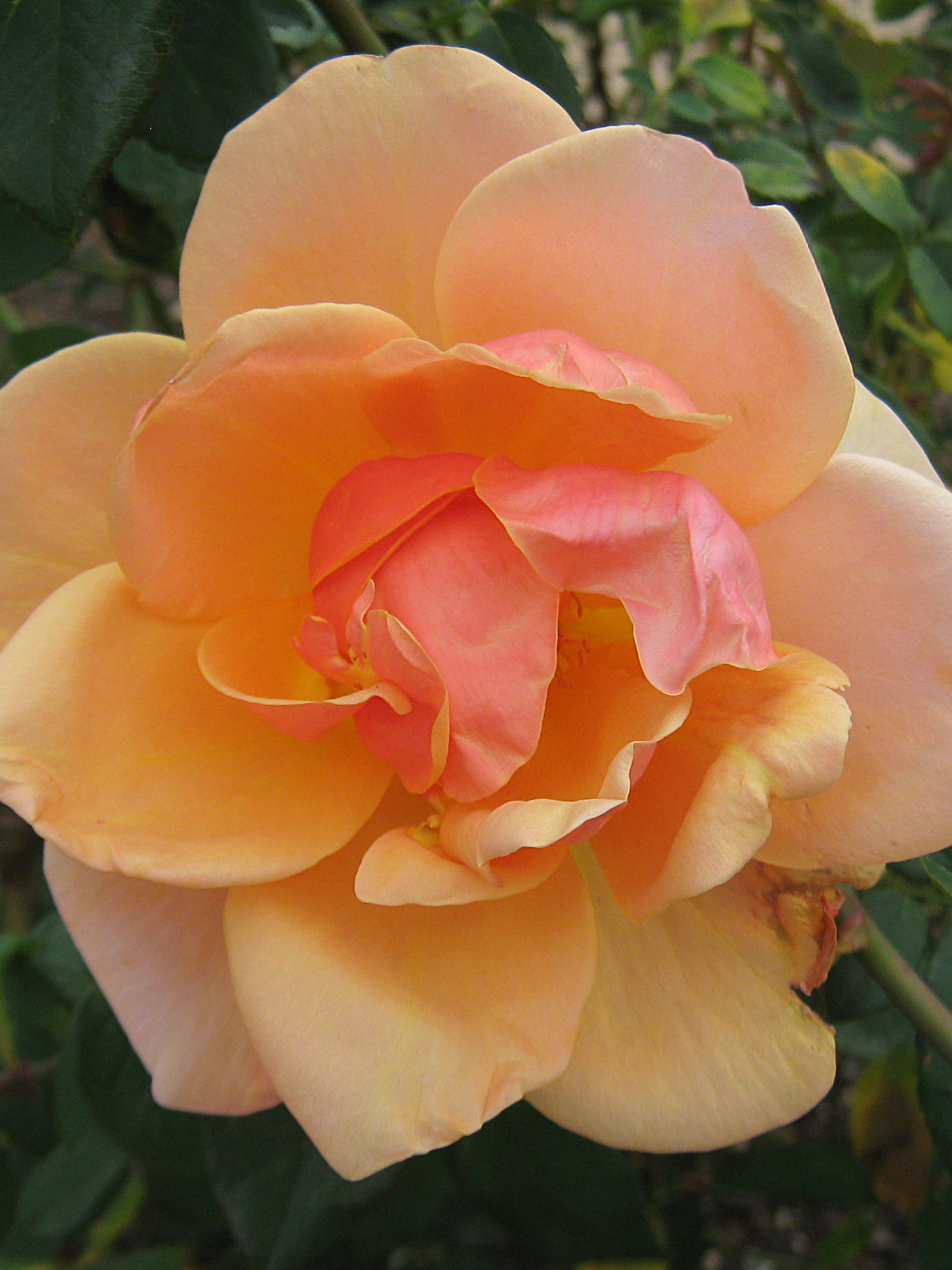
Rose 'Dettmann No 6' Pernetiana found in Dettmann's garden, Kyneton, Victoria

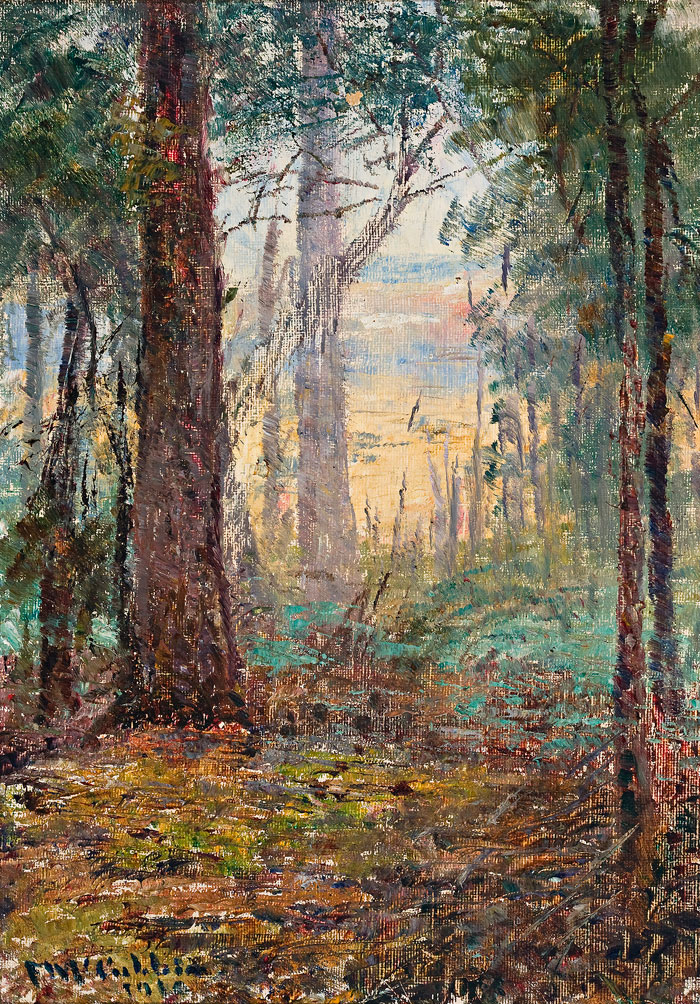
Frederick McCubbin Forest Macedon 1910

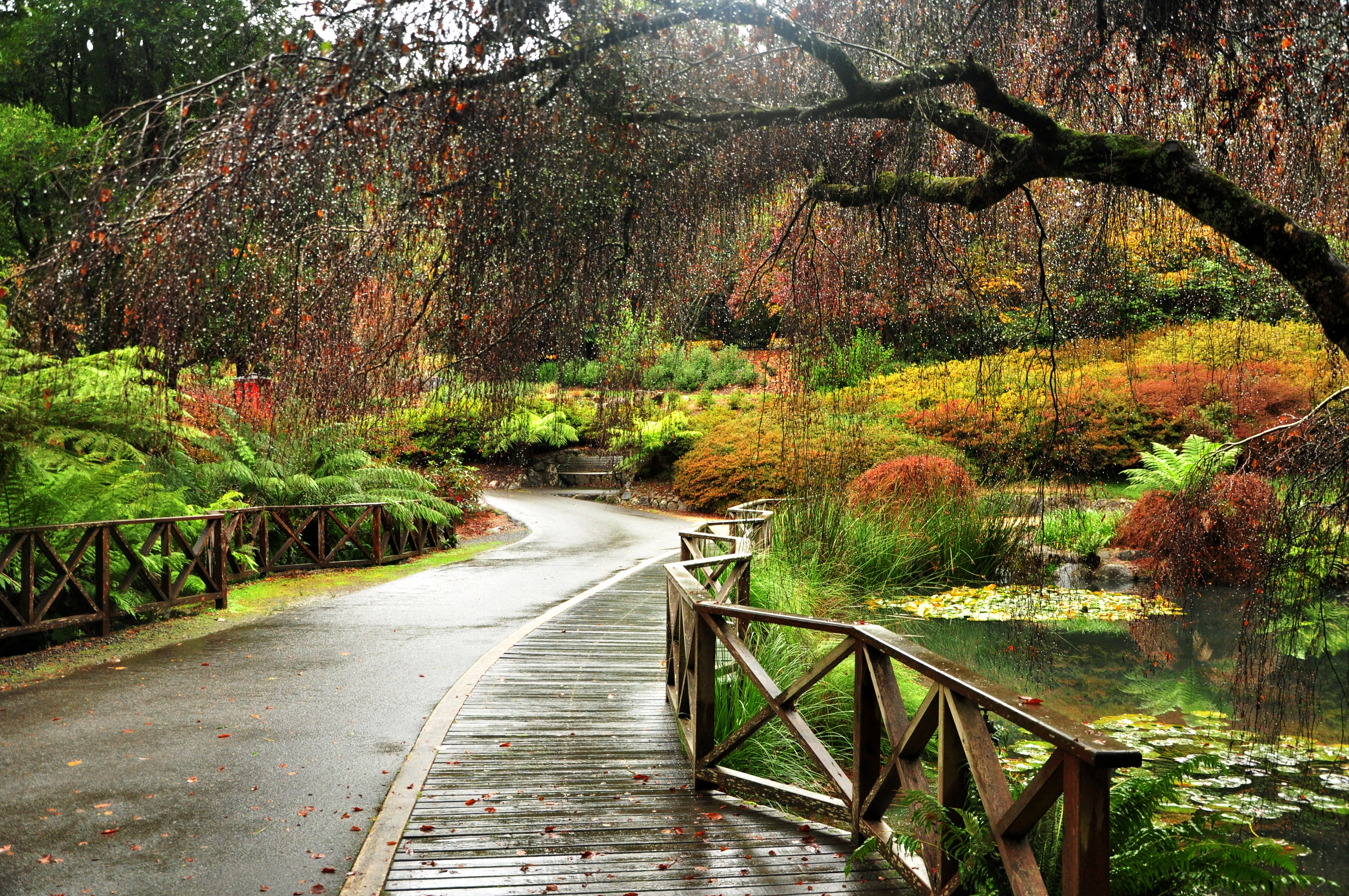
Autumn in the Dandenong Ranges 2011

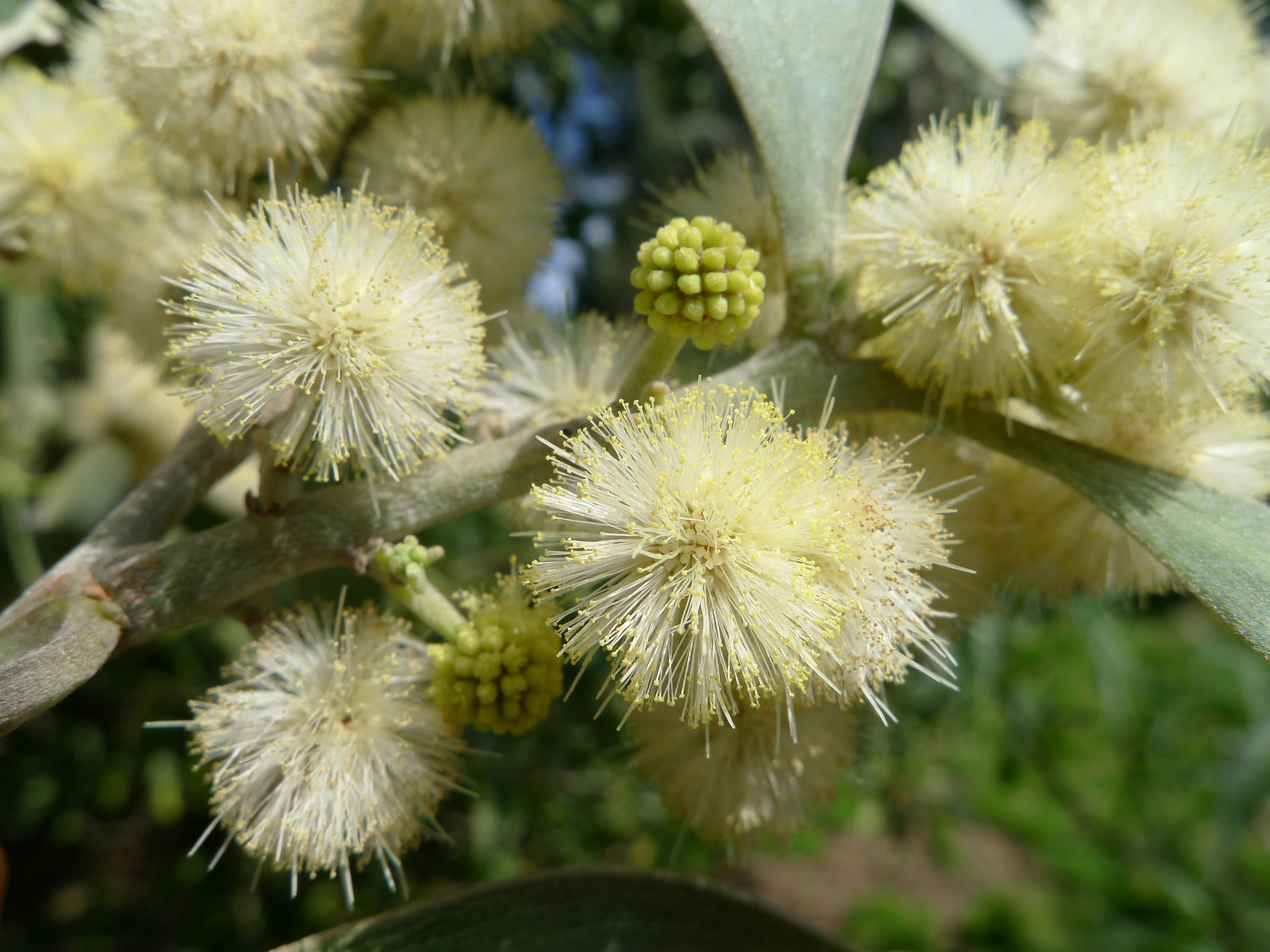
Blackwood, Acacia melanoxylon. Ashbrook Park, Rowville Victoria Australia, September 2011

ID	Name	Address	State	Source code	Source detail	Access	References	Year	Style
	Ardgartan	Branxholme, Western Districts	VIC	GIT No. 10. ACWG No. 12.	pp. 46–49 pp. 100–105	Private	Homelife – Western Victoria|Western Victorian garden by iconic Australian designer; (photo essay) Western District Historic Gardens Open Day;	1935	Edna Walling
Paul Bangay, formal garden designer	Bagnols	525 Tucks Road, Shoreham Mornington Peninsula	VIC	RAG No. 9	pp. 142–157	Private	Bagnols, Shoreham		Paul Bangay formal garden
	Beleura	Mornington	VIC	GGA No. 6	pp. 74–77	Private	Beleura House and Garden in Mornington	1863	
	Bellarine	Bellarine Peninsula, Victoria	VIC	ACGM	pp. 108–121	Private	For Jocelyn Mitchell and husband (former owners of Mawallok); Designed by Fiona Brockhoff; Bellarine Peninsula Garden Tour;		Coastal
	Benalla Botanical Gardens	Bridge Street, Benalla, 3672	VIC	PGA No. 12	pp. 70–73	Private	Benalla Botanical Gardens – Wikipedia; The Benalla Botanical Gardens; Garden Guide web – Benalla;		
The Apex Rose Garden at Benalla, Victoria 2012 The Apex Rose Garden at Benalla, Victoria 2012 Benalla Rose Garden 2012 The botanic gardens at Benalla, Victoria 2016 Benalla Botanic Gardens, Victoria, Australia 2006 Sir Edward Dunlop Statue at Benalla, Victor 2016 Weary Dunlop Memorial at Benalla, Victoria 2012
	Bickleigh Vale	Bickleigh Vale Road, Mooroolbark VIC 3138	VIC	GIT No. 1	pp. 6–15	Private	Edna Walling's Bickleigh Vale; Bickleigh Vale Village; Heritage Listed Bickleigh Vale Buildings; Gardening Australia – Fact Sheet: Bickleigh Vale – ABC; e-Heritage; National Heritage;	1921	Edna Walling, Cottage Garden
	Bindara Farm and Nursery	Gooch's Lane, Kyneton	VIC	RGA No. 7	pp. 53–61	Private	Peter Lloyd; Kyneton – margaretgriffin; Kyneton – Victoria – Australia – Travel – smh.com.au		Roses, granite boulders
	Bolobek	370 Mt Macedon Road Macedon VIC 3440	VIC	PGA No. 16. GGA No. 32. RGA No. 34.	pp. 90–95 pp. 190–191 pp. 196–202	Private	Federation House – Edwardian Heritage Gardens; Bolobek Gardens; Joan Law-Smith; Bolobek Website; Fact Sheet: 'Bolobek' – ABC; The property known as Bolobek – VHD Bolobek House And Garden; 'Bolobek' – ABC; Bolobek Garden – Aust. Heritage; Hugh and Brigid Robertson; 'The Garden Within' book by Joan Law-Smith		Roses, soul
Indicative picture	Bontharambo Homestead	387 Boohaman Road Wangaratta	VIC	USACG	pp. 13–20	Private	Nicholas Chevalier, artist (1828–1902); Bontharambo Wangaratta eHeritage; Bontharambo Homestead VHD;	1858	
Indicative picture	Boortkoi Garden	Hexham, Chatsworth Road, Hexham, VIC	VIC	GIT	pp. 66–71	Private	A Timeless Garden; Boortkoi Hexham – Evolving Gardens; National Heritage Register; [PDF]Boortkoi – Victorian Heritage Database	1937	Edna Walling
	Burnham Beeches House, Restaurant and Garden	1 Sherbrooke Road, Sherbrooke, Dandenong Ranges	VIC	ABGG #14	pp. 93–98	Private	Burnham Beeches, Sherbooke website; Burnham Beeches, Sherbooke - Wikipedia;	1929	Temperate
Indicative picture	By a Billabong	Dandenong Ranges: 1 Holden Rd, Olinda VIC 3788	VIC	ACG No. 19	pp. 130–135	Private	Phillip Johnson, Landscape Designer; Phillip Johnson Landscapes; Phillip Johnson Landscapes – Facebook; Phillip Johnson Landscapes;		Waterscape, native garden
	Carnegie Garden	4 Grant Avenue, Toorak VIC	VIC	GIT No. 16	pp. 72–75	Private	For Mr Douglas and Mrs Margaret Carnegie (1910–2002); The Carnegie family owned the property, Kildrummie; From c1958, 4 Grant Avenue was the home of Baillieu Myer.	1937	Edna Walling
"Lorraine Lee"	Claremont House and Garden	143 Noble Street, Newtown, Geelong	VIC	RGA No. 25	pp. 161–166	Private	Home of the Gray family, National Trust Classified; State Library Vic: Historical photos of Clarement garden; Brief History at Ancestry.com; Claremont – Victorian Heritage Database; Alister ClarkAlister Clark Rose breeder: "Lorraine Lee"plantings; cf. Rad.Tce. Geelong's Great Houses;		Roses, Hybrid Teas
	Cloudehill Nursery	89 Olinda-Monbulk Rd, Olinda VIC 3788 (Dandenong Ranges)	VIC	RAG No. 7	pp. 116–127	Public	Cloudehill Gardens; Cloudehill Gardens – Visit	1895	Garden nursery
	Coniston	Cope-Williams Winery, 160 Glenfern Road, Romsey 3434	VIC	RGA No. 2	pp. 17–26	Private	Cope-Williams Winery.		Roses, English style
Indicative picture	Country Garden Taradale	119 Phillips Rd, Taradale VIC 3447	VIC	PGA No. 2	pp. 124–127	Private	Taradale House Estate;		
	Cruden Farm	60 Cranbourne Rd, Langwarrin VIC 3910	VIC	PGA No. 19, GGA No. 25, PG No. 11, GIT No. 7, RGA No. 12, ACWG No. 11	pp. 106–111, pp. 164–169, pp. 190–201, pp. 32–35, pp. 95–102, pp. 92–99	Private	Elisabeth Murdoch; Former Home of Dame Elizabeth Murdoch (1909–2012); Aust Heritage Register – Cruden Farm Garden; YouTube: Burke' Backyard, Cruden Farm; Cruden Farm; Cruden Farm – The Garden Clinic;	1929	Edna Walling, roses, picking garden
	Cuming Garden	161–163 Kooyong Road, Toorak VIC	VIC	GIT No. 18	pp. 78–81	Private	For Mrs R.A. Cuming; Cuming Garden – National Heritage Register; Cuming Garden – Victorian Heritage Database; Heritage – Cuming Garden Pond;	1939	Edna Walling
	Dalvui	4310 Mackinnons Bridge Road, Noorat	VIC	PGA No. 23, GGA No. 16	pp. 128–135, pp. 126–129	Private	Federation-House – Dalvui, Terang, Vic; Dalvui House & Garden – VHD; Dalvui – a grand Guilfoyle garden; William Guilfoyle;	1909	William Guilfoyle, Roses
Indicative picture	Delatite Station	361 Delatite Road (also Lane), Mansfield	VIC	RAG No. 11, PGA No. 15, GGA No. 4	pp. 172–185, pp. 85–89, pp. 66–69	Public	Delatite Station – Accommodation Mansfield;	1902–1936	Colour themes, Roses, Formal Rose Garden, Victorian & naturalistic
	Dreamthorpe	Mt Macedon	VIC	PGA	pp. 101–105	Private	Mount Macedon Open Garden Weekends; Homelife – Historic hill garden; Australian Open Garden Scheme – ABC;	early 1900s	Cool climate
	Dunedin	Main Road, Tyers	VIC	USACG No. 10	pp. 61–66	Private	Jean Galbraith (1906–1999); This was the first wildflower sanctuary; Tyers, Victoria – Wikipedia; Jean Galbraith – Wikipedia; A life in the garden – writing Jean Galbraith's story – ABC; Jean Galbraith and friends;	1900s	Naturalistic
	Durrol	Mt Macedon Road, Mount Macedon VIC	VIC	GIT No. 6	pp. 28–31	Private	Durrol Garden – Victorian Heritage Database; Durrol Garden – National Heritage Register; Photo and Photos of Durrol, house and garden, Mount Macedon;	1928	Edna Walling, sunken garden
	Eurambeen	232 Eurambeen-Streatham Rd, Beaufort VIC 3373	VIC	GIT No. 13	pp. 58–61	Private	Eurambeen Historic Homestead and Gardens; Eurambeen Historic Homestead and Gardens | MyOpenGarden; Eurambeen Historic Homestead and Gardens – Visit Victoria; Eurambeen Historic Homestead and Gardens Beaufort, VIC – Visit the Grampians;	1937	Edna Walling
	Forest Glade Gardens	816 Mount Macedon Road, Mount Macedon	VIC	Web discovery	Mount Macedon Private Garden	Private	Mount Macecdon Private Gardens; Forest Glade Panorama;		Cool climate
	Freiberg Garden	26 Yarravale Road, Kew, Vic 3101	VIC	GIT No. 24	pp. 102–103	Private	Freiberg House – Wikipedia; Description • Key influences and design approach • Gallery • References; Freiberg House, 1960s Kew residence designed by Chancellor and Patrick; 26 Yarravale Road, Kew, Vic 3101 – Property Details; Set in the first entirely native garden planted by Edna Walling; From bold modernist visions, a future built on hope – Domain;	1960	Edna Walling, informal, native
	(Secret Garden)	Garden of Bill and Grace Maxwell, Dandenong Ranges	VIC	ABGG #12	pp. 83–88	Private	The Secret Gardens of the Dandenong Ranges; Secret Gardens of the Dandenong Ranges Tour Dates;		Temperate
	Garden of St Erth	189 Simmons Reef Rd, Blackwood VIC 3458	VIC	PGA No. 20	pp. 112–118	Private	The Garden of St Erth – The Diggers Club; Garden of St Erth – Burke's Backyard; The Diggers Club;		Nursery
	Giverny	69 Cherrys Lane, Toolangi VIC 3777	VIC	ACG No. 16	pp. 114–117	Private	Giverny Estate – Winery & Kiwi Fruit Wines, Yarra Valley; Giverny Estate — Wineries in Toolangi, VIC, Australia;		
	Glenara	1 Glenara Road, Bulla	VIC	RGA No. 37	p. 223	Private	Alister Clark's garden/nursery; Ruth Rundle; Classified by the National Trust;		Roses, breeder
	Gulls Way	Gulls Way, Frankston South Victoria 3199	VIC	GIT No. 4	pp. 22–23	Private	Holiday home of Mrs H.R. Hamer, Garden Plan; parent of Victorian Premier, Sir Rupert Hamer;	1927	Edna Walling, informal
	Heide Museum of Modern Art	7 Templestowe Rd, Bulleen VIC 3105	VIC	USACG No. 16, RGA No. 13	pp. 101–108, pp. 102–104	Public	Sunday Reed, Art Museum; Gardens & Sculpture Park – Heide Museum of Modern Art; Garden at Heide; Victorian Heritage Database; Heide II Kitchen Garden – Victorian Heritage Database; Heide Museum of Modern Art – Wikipedia; Modern Love: the Lives of John & Sunday Reed;	1880s	Secret garden, roses, potager
Art patrons John Reed and Sunday Reed, artist Sidney Nolan and others gathered in the library at Heide, 1942 Heide Museum & Garden A sculpture in the gardens at the Heide Museum of Modern Art, Melbourne, Australia The Heide 1 building at the Heide Museum of Modern Art, Melbourne 2008 A sculpture in the gardens at Heide Museum of Modern Art, Melbourne, Australia. Heide I, viewed from the front gardens, in the Heide Museum of Modern Art in Bulleen, Victoria, Melbourne A sculpture in the gardens at Heide Museum of Modern Art, Bulleen, Victoria, Melbourne, Australia A Sculpture in the gardens at the Heide Museum of Modern Art, Bulleen, Victoria, Melbourne, Australia Sculpture park next to the Heide Museum of Modern Art Sculpture park next to the Heide Museum of Modern Art
	Karwarra	1190–1196 Mt Dandenong Tourist Road (behind Kalorama Memorial Reserve), Kalorama, VIC 3766	VIC	ABGG #18	pp. 117–122	Public	Karwarra Australian Native Botanic Garden; BGANZ member; Plant Trust;	1965	Temperate
	Langulac	Penshurst, Minhamite, Moyne Shire VIC	VIC	ACWG No. 14	pp. 114–119	Private	Listed by the National Trust of Victoria: VHD Listing; Edward Twomey of Langulac – Penshurst;	1855	Google site;
	Lavender Lane Garden	Seaside Cottage, 13 Fenton Crescent, near Lavender Lane, Frankston VIC	VIC	GIT No. 19	pp. 82–83	Private	Edna Walling House and Garden design for Mrs Veda Timms; National Trust listed house and garden;	1942	Edna Walling
	Ledger Garden	Wooleen Garden, 18 Mitchell Street, Benalla VIC; 10 years after her garden plan for Yathong 11 Church Street, Benalla	VIC	GIT No. 14	pp. 62–35	Private	Garden for Mr and Mrs Laurence Ledger, benefactors of the Benalla Art Gallery; Wooleen Garden – Victorian Heritage Database;	1937	Edna Walling
	Linden Cottage	1383 Mount Dandenong Tourist Road, Mount Dandenong VIC 3767	VIC	ABGG #19	pp. 123–126	Private	Linden Cottage – Linden Gardens – Luxury B&B;		Temperate
Indicative of wealth of (business) owner	Little Milton	26 Albany Road, Toorak, Vic 3142 (A small scale replica of the stately English manor Great Milton in Oxfordshire)	VIC	GIT No. 5	pp. 24–27	Private	LITTLE MILTON – Victorian Heritage; 26 Albany Road, Toorak, Vic 3142 – Property Details; Nothing little about Milton, or its neighbours; Little Milton – Victorian Heritage Database;	1927	Edna Walling
Indicative only	Marathon	12 Marathon Dr, Mount Eliza, VIC	VIC	GGA No. 17	pp. 130–133	Private	Marathon House & Garden – VHD; Marathon – Victorian Heritage Database; Federation-House – Melbourne's Federation Heritage;		
Indicative picture	Marmanie	Mt Macedon	VIC	PGA No. 17	pp. 96–100	Private	Mount Macedon – Wikipedia		
	Maryton Park	36 Maryton Lane, Marysville VIC 3779	VIC	ACG No. 12	pp. 85–91	Private	Bushfire recovery; Maryton Park B & B; Maryton Park Country Cottages (Marysville); Marysville Tourism | Maryton Park; Maryton Park – Lake Eildon;		
William Guilfoyle	Mawallok	3802 Geelong Road, Stockyard Hill, near Beaufort	VIC	PGA No. 21. GGA No. 15	pp. 119–123 pp. 122–125	Private	Mawallok – Open Garden Details; Mawallok Homestead & Garden – Victorian Heritage Database; Homelife – Grand Designs;	1909	William Guilfoyle
	Mawarra	7 Monash Ave, Olinda VIC 3788	VIC	PGA No. 14. GGA No. 26. GIT No. 9 (spelt as 'Marwarra') ABGG	pp. 79–84 pp. 170–171 pp. 67–70	Private	Mawarra Historic House – Sherbrooke; Edna Walling Cottage and Mawarra Manor; MAWARRA – Victorian Heritage Database; National Heritage Registered; Edwardian Heritage Gardens;	1932	Edna Walling, Temperate
	McKay Gardens	120 Anderson Rd, Sunshine VIC 3020	VIC	https://vhd.heritagecouncil.vic.gov.au/places/11984		Public	HV McKay Memorial Gardens - Victorian Heritage Database	1909	Industrial Garden, Edwardian
	Mica Grange	373 Faraday/Sutton Grange Rd Sutton Grange Vic 3448	VIC	ACG No. 14	pp. 98–105	Private	Bede and Mary Gibson; Mica Grange – A picturesque 40 hectare property; Latest News – Mica Grange; "Mica Grange" – One of Australia's finest gardens in Sutton Grange, VIC; Mica Grange Sculpture Garden: Mt. Alexander – Castlemaine Art;		Sculpture
	Musk Cottage	371 Musk Creek Road, Flinders 3929	VIC	ACGM #11	pp. 166–181	Private	Eckersley Flinders – Garden DesignFest 2016; Musk Cottage – Open Garden Details – Open Gardens Victoria; Open Garden Victoria Launch at Musk Cottage – Mornington Tourism; Musk Cottage – GardenDrum; Project: Musk Cottage, Flinders – Eckersley Garden Architecture; NOT Stuart Rattle's Musk Farm;		Coastal
Created by Stuart Rattle, interior designer.	Musk Farm	School Road, Daylesford VIC	VIC	RAG No. 13	pp. 198–215	Private	Musk Farm sale; School's out at Musk Farm; Gardening Australia – Fact Sheet: Musk Farm – ABC; NOT Musk Cottage;	1998	Formal Victorian
	Nareen	Coleraine, Victoria	VIC	RGA	p. 156	Private	Former home of Prime Minister Malcolm Fraser, and wife Tamie Fraser, patron of Open Gardens (Victoria).		Roses, space
	Naringal	Lismore Road, Cape Clear VIC	VIC	GIT No. 22. ACWG No. 13.	pp. 92–95 pp. 106–113	Private	Rowe family; Naringal Homestead – Luxury Farm, a Cape Clear Farmstay – Stayz; Cape Clear – Victorian Places; Naringal Private Cemetery – Victorian Heritage Database;	1951	Edna Walling
	Pallant's Hill, now George Tindale Memorial Garden	33 Sherbrooke Road Sherbrooke, Yarra Ranges Shire	VIC	ABGG No. 2	pp. 31–34	Private	George Tindale Memorial Gardens.	1950s	Temperate
	Pirianda Gardens	Hacketts Rd, Olinda VIC 3788	VIC	GGA No. 30. ABGG No. 4.	pp. 184–187 pp. 39–42	Public	Parks Victoria – Pirianda Gardens; Pirianda Garden in the Dandenongs;		Woodland, terraced
	Rippon Lea	192 Hotham St, Elsternwick VIC 3185	VIC	GGA No. 8. ABGG No. 20.	pp. 80–85 pp. 457–136	Public	Rippon Lea – National Trust;	1868	Temperate
Rippon Lea back garden Rippon Lea boat house Rippon Lea Estate, Victoria Rippon Lea fernery Rippon Lea front door Rippon Lea front gates
	Royal Melbourne Botanic Gardens	Birdwood Avenue, Royal Botanic Gardens Victoria	VIC	ABGG #16	pp. 103–108	Public	Royal Botanic Gardens Victoria;	1846	Temperate, William Guilfoyle
Royal Botanic Gardens Victoria Royal Botanic Gardens Victoria Royal Botanic Gardens Victoria Royal Botanic Gardens Victoria Royal Botanic Gardens Victoria Gardenology: Royal Botanic Gardens Victoria Gardenology: Royal Botanic Gardens Victoria Gardenology: Royal Botanic Gardens Victoria Gardenology: Royal Botanic Gardens Victoria Gardenology: Royal Botanic Gardens Victoria Gardenology: Royal Botanic Gardens Victoria
World heritage-listed garden	Royal Exhibition Building and Carlton Gardens	9 Nicholson St, Carlton VIC 3053	VIC	Web	Royal Exhibition Building and Carlton Gardens		Royal Exhibition Building – Museums Victoria Carlton Gardens: Royal Exhibition Building – Museums Victoria The Carlton Gardens are in two parts What's On: Royal Exhibition Building – Museums Victoria.	1880, 1888	Victorian
Royal Exhibition Building and Carlton Gardens, Melbourne 2015 Carlton's Royal Exhibition Building located on Rathdowne Street The Royal Exhibition Building, showing the fountain on the southern or Carlton Gardens side of the building Royal Exhibition Building 2016 The Royal Exhibition Building in the Carlton Gardens, Melbourne 2015 Old building set within Carlton Gardens Royal Exhibition Building in Melbourne, Victoria 2007 Royal Exhibition Building 2010
Indicative picture	Seaton Vale	419 Gobur Rd Yarck, VIC	VIC	PGA No. 13	pp. 74–78	Private	Seaton Vale Pastoral Co		
	Silver Birches	Yarrbat Avenue, Balwyn	VIC	GIT No. 12	pp. 54–57	Private	for Mr Douglas George of "George's Store"	1936	Edna Walling
	Stewart Garden	6 Kenly Court, Toorak	VIC	GIT No. 25	pp. 104–107	Private	20th century The best suburb... – City of Stonnington;	1963	Edna Walling
	Stoneacres Farm	330 Scotchmans Road, Drysdale, Bellarine Peninsular, near Geelong	VIC	RGA No. 27	pp. 169–176	Private	Stoneacres Farm is a large orchard/rose garden/nursery which is situated on elevated ground offering fine views over the bay. There is a rose walk;		Roses, seaside
	The Bush Garden	Eltham	VIC	PGA No. 25	pp. 141–144	Private	The Ford Garden, Eltham; Gordon Ford with Gwen Ford, The Natural Australian Garden, Blooming Books, 1999; Gardening Australia – Fact Sheet: Gordon Ford – ABC; A.B.G Australian Bush Gardens;		
	The Castlemaine Gardens	Castlemaine	VIC	PGA No. 26	pp. 145–151	Public	Castlemaine & District Festival of Gardens; Buda Historic Home & Garden; Castlemaine Botanical Gardens;		
	The Grimwade Garden	'Miegunyah', 641 Orrong Road, Toorak	VIC	GIT No. 3	pp. 18–21	Private	Lecture: Toorak Mansions; National Heritage Registered;	1926	Formal
	Thulu	49 Duffy Street, Portsea	VIC	ACGM #17	pp. 254–269	Private	Contemporary coastal garden complementing striking modern house. Structural elements are softened by clipped native shrubs, grasses and succulents.		Coastal
	Victoria State Rose Garden	Main Drive, Werribee South VIC 3030	VIC	Web	.	Public	Winner of the prestigious World Federation of Rose Societies Award for Garden Excellence; Home Victoria State Rose Garden, Werribee Park State Rose Garden – Walking Maps Victoria State Rose Garden – Facebook	1976	Roses
	Wairere Homestead Restoration	1 Fielding Lane, Piries, near Mansfield, VIC 3723	VIC	GIT No. 26	pp. 108–111	Private	Lifestyle property Wairere Homestead at Mansfield/Piries;	1925	Edna Walling

== Heritage gardens in Western Australia ==
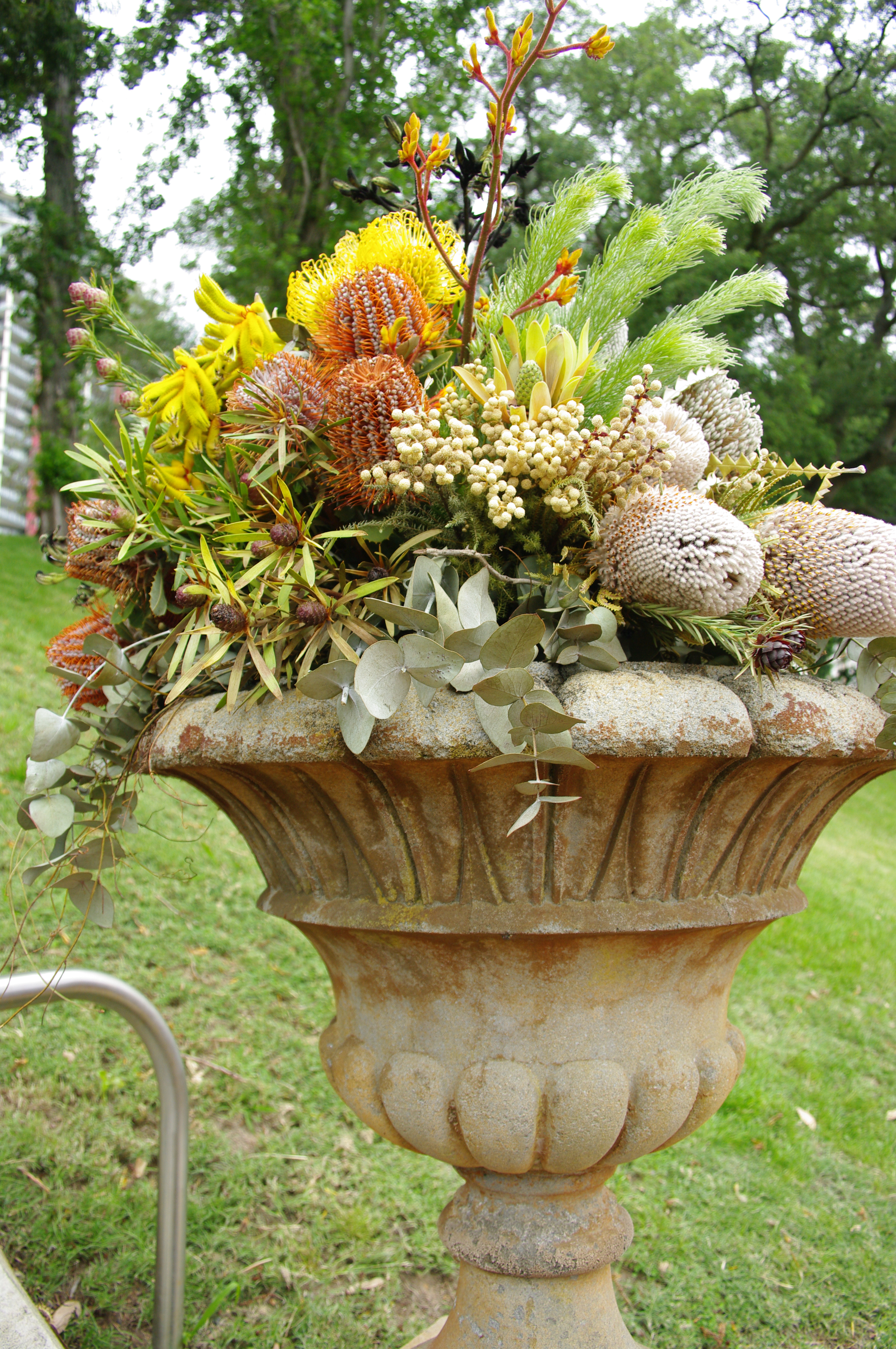
Heritage Day Perth Western Australia

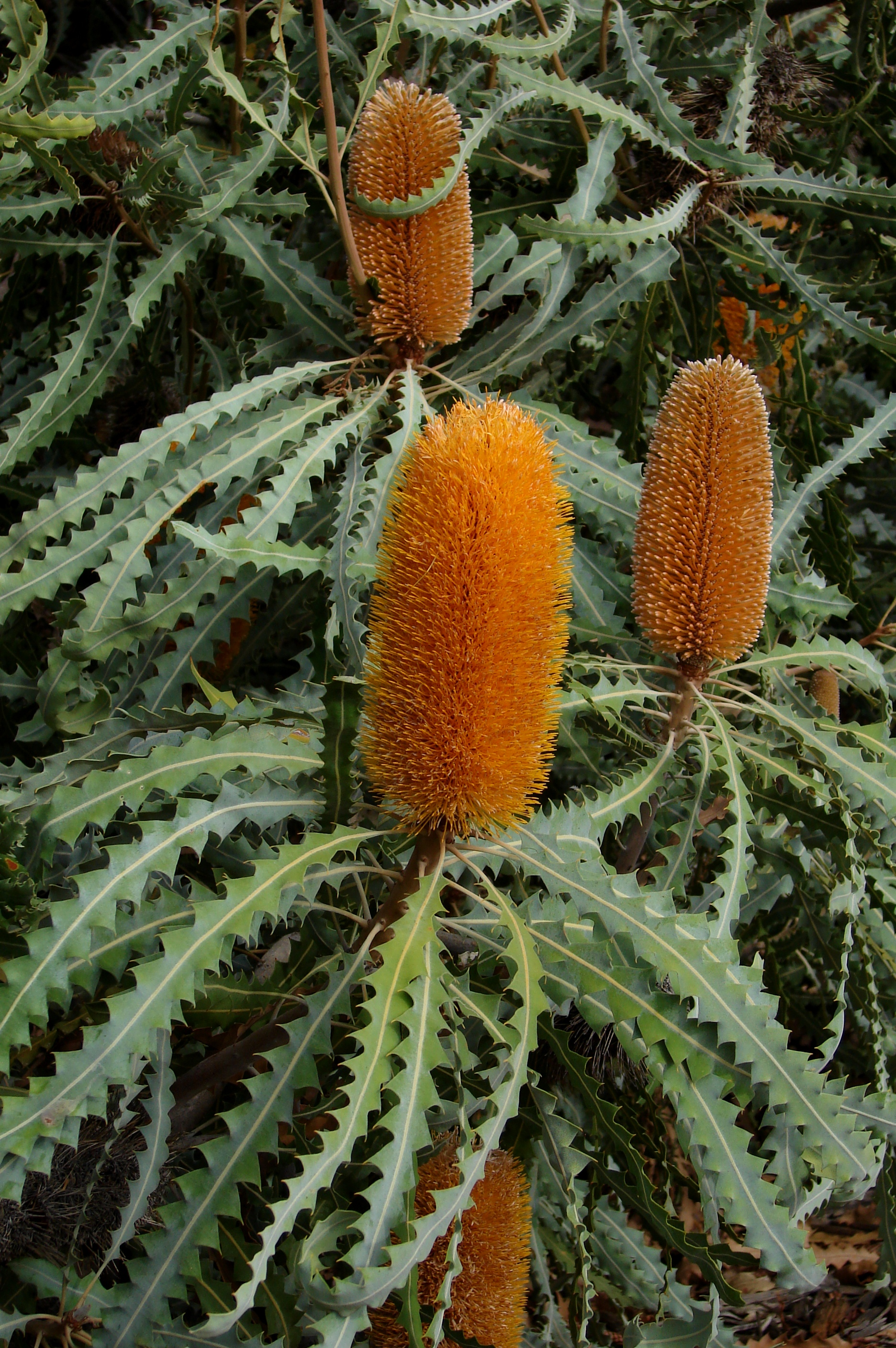
Ashby's Banksia, Kings Park, Perth, WA

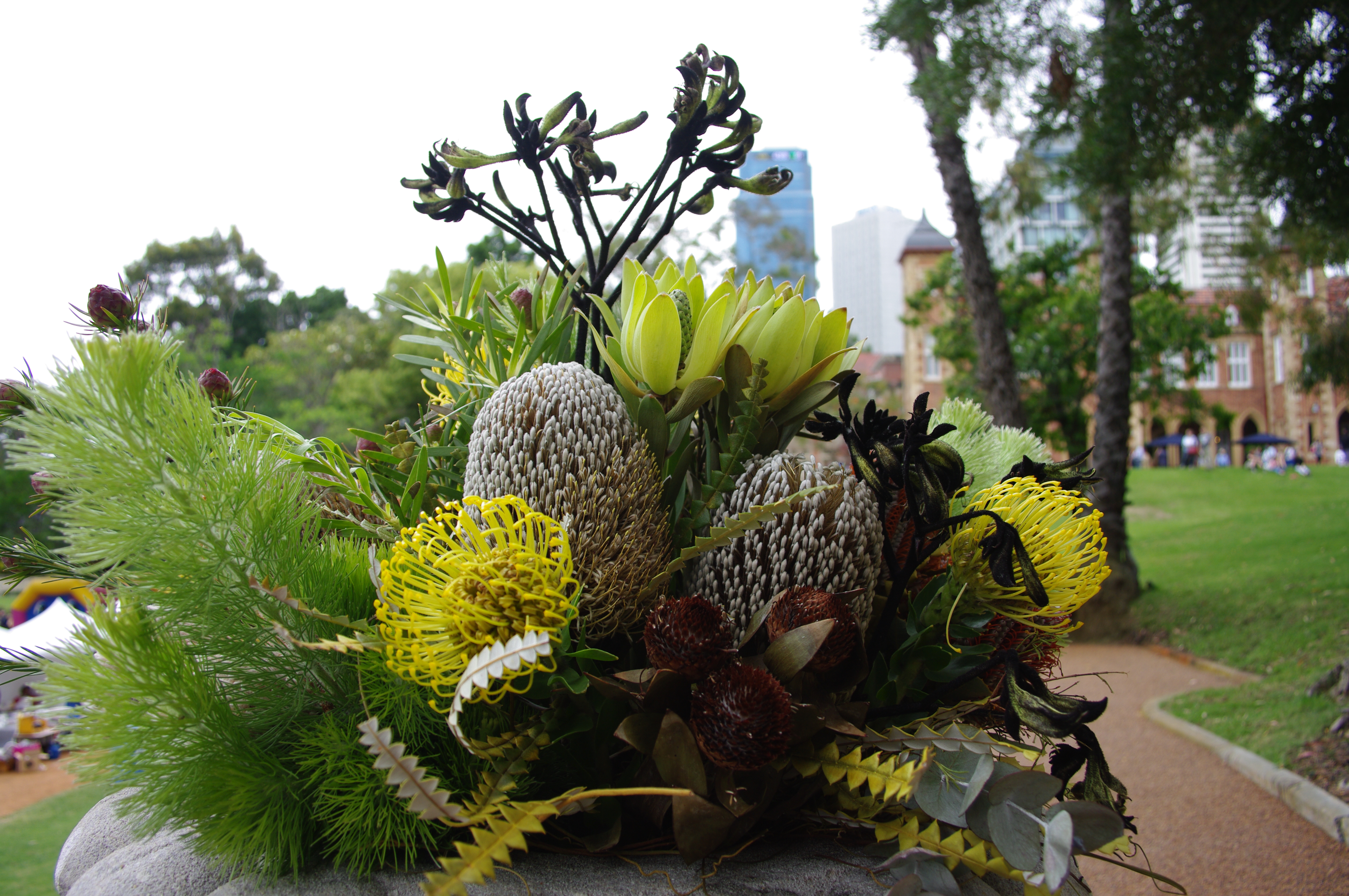
Heritage Day Perth Western Australia

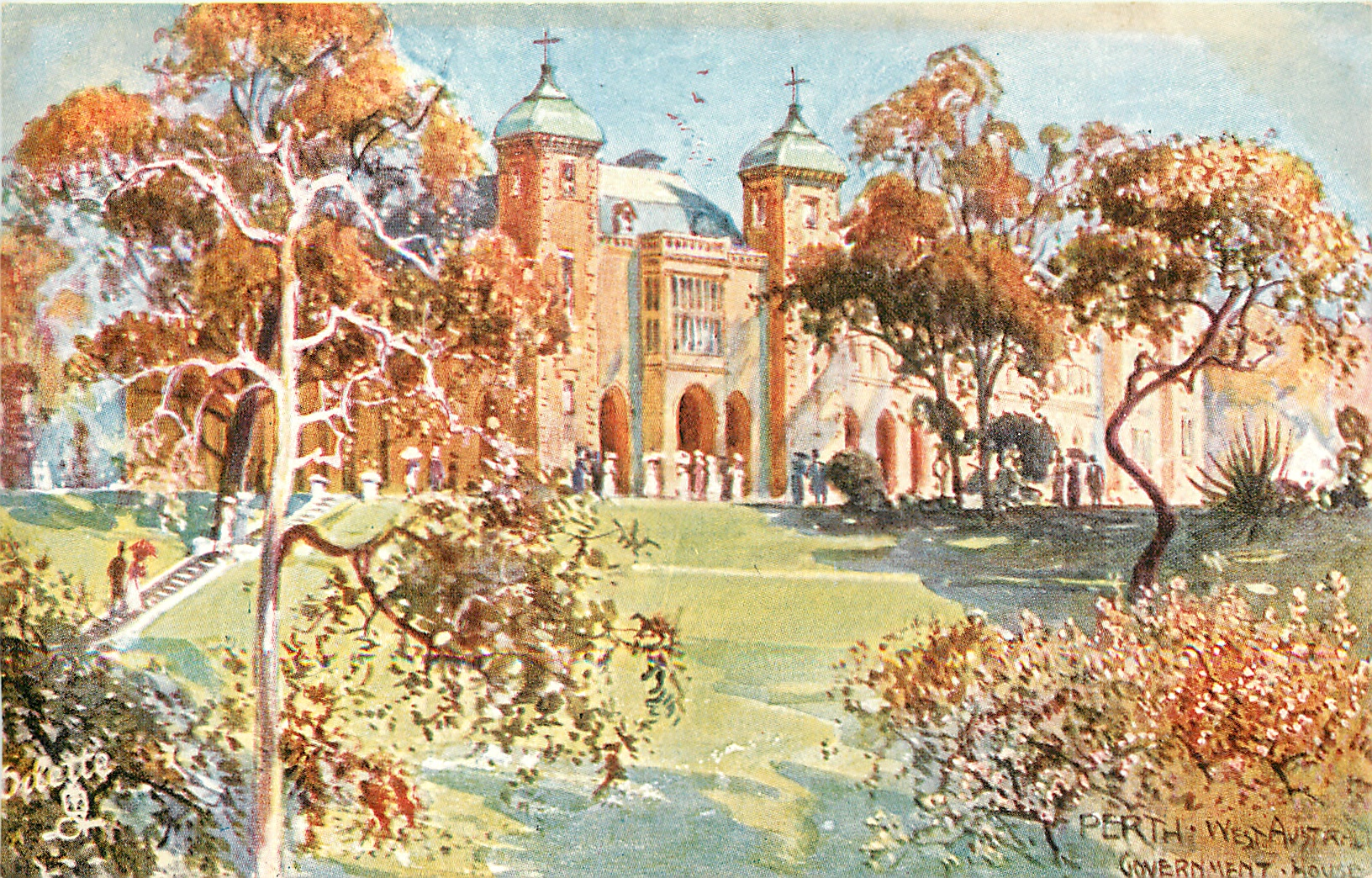
1912 Postcard Government House, W.A. by Albert Henry Fullwood

No.	Name	Address	State	Source code	Source detail	Access	References	Year	Style	
Bishop Hales House, Perth	Bishop's House	90 Mounts Bay Road, Perth	WA	PG No. 37	pp. 208–214	Private	Bishops House – Lamont's Winery and Food; Bishop's House :: Heritage Perth; Bishops See Gardens | Open House Perth			
Perth CBD Bishop's House Gardens at Bishops See (w:Bishop's House, Perth) Bishop Hales' House, Perth 2006 Gardens at Bishops See (w:Bishop's House, Perth) Gardens at Bishops See (w:Bishop's House, Perth) 2014 Gardens at Bishops See (Bishop's House, Perth) 2014 Gardens at Bishops See (Bishop's House, Perth) 2014 Gardens at Bishops See (Bishop's House, Perth) Gardens at Bishops See Gardens at Bishops See Gardens at Bishops See Gardens at Bishops See Perth
	Government House	St Georges Terrace, Perth	WA	GGA No. 7, ABGG No. 27	pp. 78–79 pp. 163–166	Private	Government House – Home; Government House, Perth; Government House – Heritage Perth; [www.govhouse.wa.gov.au/the-house/the-gardens.html Government House – The Gardens]		Dry climate	
Government House, Perth 1872 Government House, Perth 1892 Government House, Perth: Tucks Oilette postcard 1911/1912 Gardens and grounds of Government House, Perth Government House, Perth Government House, Perth Government House, Perth Heritage Day Perth Western Australia Government House Heritage Day Perth Western Australia Government House
	Kings Park and Narrows Interchange	Kings Park, Western Australia	WA	ABGG	pp. 137–122	Public	Kings Park, Western Australia; Botanic Gardens and Parks Authority – Kings Park; Kings Park – Places to Visit – Experience Perth;			Dry climate
Kings Park, Western Australia Banksia ashbyi in Kings Park CBD skyline from King's Park Panorama of Lemon scented gums (Corymbia citriodora) along Fraser Avenue, Kings Park Kings Park, Western Australia
	Strawberry Hill Farm	174 Middleton Rd, Mount Clarence WA 6330	WA	ABGG No. 25	pp. 155–156	Public	Old Farm, Strawberry Hill – National Trust.		Dry climate	
One of Australia's best gardens	Tipperary Church B&B	2092 Northam Rd, York, WA 6302	WA	PG No. 35	pp. 196–201	Private	One of Australia's best gardens:Tipperary Church – Burke's Backyard; Tipperary Farm built c1836; The Lodgings B&B;	1836		
	University of WA	35 Stirling Hwy, Crawley WA 6009	WA	ABGG No. 32	pp. 183–186	Public	Design development: Landscaping and gardens; Sunken Garden; Tropical Grove; WA State Heritage Registered;		Dry climate	
The Oak Lawn at University of Western Australia UWA lawn near Reid Library Sundial at Uni of Western Australia Sunken Garden UWA Geology Grove UWA Winthrop Hall St George's College, UWA
The major design influence of the University of WA landscape was attributed to Oliver Dowell and George Munns.: The Sunken Gardens was originally a sand pit excavated during construction of the Hackett Memorial Buildings. Terraced steps look down over a level circular grassed area as a stage.; The State Heritage Register includes the Sunken Gardens, the Great Court Area, Sommerville auditorium surrounds, Cathedral of Trees, Whitfield Court and the historic oak lawn.; Noteworthy are the highly varied gardens, including many mature trees and massed plantings of flowering shrubs.; The Great Court features Australia natives.; The Oak lawn is remnant of original Shenton farm, on which the campus was established in 1914.; The design of the Whitfield Court in Classical Style includes a reflecting pond.; The Sunken Gardens is in a Romantic Style, encouraging introspection.; The Great Court is in a Paradise Style, with informal arrangements and natives, exotics and shrubs.; the Paradise Style was innovative for its time.

- Index Sources – 13 reference books summarised below.

== Index source references ==
Title	Author	Publisher	Address	Year	Media type	Source code	Entries
Rural Australian Gardens	Myles Baldwin, Simon Griffiths (photography)	Murdoch Books	Crows Nest	2010	Book	RAG	18
Private Gardens of Australia	Sarah Guest, Jerry Harpur (photography)	Weidenfeld & Nicolson	London	1990	Book	PGA	37
The Great Gardens of Australia	Howard Tanner, Jane Begg	Macmillan	South Melbourne	1976	Book	GGA	33
Under the Spell of Australia: Australian Country Gardens	Trisha Dixon	National Library of Australia	Canberra	2007	Book	USACG	53
Australia the Beautiful: Great Gardens	Prof. Michael Martin McCarthy (ed.)	Ure Smith	McMahons Point	1983	Book	ABGG	53
The Great Gardens of Australia	Douglass Baglin (photography)	Prestige Publishing	Dee Why	1983	Book	TGGA	83
Australian Country Gardens	Kirsty McKenzie (ed.)	Universal Magazines	North Ryde	2014	Bookazine	ACG	25
Gardens in Australia	Sarah Guest, Simon Griffiths (photography)	New Holland	Sydney	2001	Book	GIA	29
Period Gardens: Landscapes for Houses with History	Myles Baldwin, Simon Griffiths (photography)	Murdoch Books	Millers Point	2008	Book	PG	13
Australian Coastal Gardens	Myles Baldwin, Sue Stubbs (photography)	Murdoch Books	Crows Nest	2013	Book	ACGM	17
Gardens in Time: In the footsteps of Edna Walling	Trisha Dixon, Jennie Churchill	Angus & Robertson; HarperCollins	North Ryde	1990	Book	GIT	28
Rose Gardens of Australia	Susan Irvine, Simon Griffiths (photography)	Viking Penguin Australia	Ringwood	1997	Book	RGA	37
The Aust. Country Woman's Garden	Holly Kerr Forsyth	Random House	Milsons Point	1998	Book	ACWG	21

== See also ==
- Australia's Open Garden Scheme
- Gardening in Australia
