= Ramsay House, Mount Eliza =

Heritage-listed house in Melbourne, Victoria, Australia

Ramsay House
- Location of the house in Greater Metropolitan Melbourne
- Interactive map of the Ramsay House area

General information
- Status: Completed
- Type: Beach house
- Architectural style: Modernist International
- Location: 29 Rendlesham Avenue, Mount Eliza, Mornington Peninsula, Melbourne, Victoria, Australia
- Coordinates: 38°10′40″S 145°04′41″E
- Completed: 1937; 89 years ago
- Renovated: 1950s; 2017
- Client: Betty Ramsay
- Owner: Betty Ramsay (1937-1941); Roy and Betty Grounds (1941–1950s); Frederick Romberg (1950s–2007); Victoria Grounds (since 2007)

Technical details
- Material: Timber; weatherboard; hessian; terracotta
- Size: 4.4 by 9 m (14 by 30 ft)
- Floor count: 3
- Floor area: 70 m^{2} (750 sq ft)

Design and construction
- Architect: Roy Grounds

Renovating team
- Architects: Frederick Romberg (1950s); Victoria Grounds (2017)
- Awards: Mornington Peninsula Heritage Award (2018)

Victorian Heritage Register
- Official name: Ramsay House
- Type: Registered place
- Designated: 9 October 2008
- Reference no.: H2181
- Heritage overlay no.: HO217
- Category: Residential buildings (private)

The Ramsay House is a timber beach house located at 29 Rendlesham Avenue in Mount Eliza, on the Mornington Peninsula, in the south eastern suburbs of Melbourne, in Victoria, Australia.

Built in 1937 on the traditional lands of the Bunurong people, the house was added to the Victorian Heritage Register on 9 October 2008 in recognition of its historical and architectural significance.

== History ==
The Ramsay House was designed by Roy Grounds for Alice Bettine (Betty) Ramsay, wife of Sir Thomas Ramsay, chairman of the Kiwi Boot Polish Company. It was built in 1937 on the Ranelagh Estate overlooking Port Phillip on a steep cliff side site and was one of a number of Modernist International style houses built on the Mornington Peninsula during the middle part of the twentieth century which Robin Boyd cited as the testing ground innovation in domestic building in Victoria.

[The Peninsula], …a watering-place for every class of Melbourne citizen, deserves credit for having been for over half a century the testing ground for progressive movements in domestic architecture…

— Robin Boyd, 1950

In 1938, Grounds separated from his wife, Regina Marr, and lived with Betty Ramsay – his client – whom he married in 1941, and Grounds lived in the house he designed; and they moved to the Roy Grounds House in Toorak in 1953.

In 1953, the Ramsay House was sold to Grounds and Boyd's business partner, Frederick Romberg and his wife Verena, and they extended the house to enclose the small ground-level balcony that once opened off the upstairs bedroom. In 1986, they added a two-bedroom timber cottage at 31 Rendlesham Avenue, not part of the heritage curtail.

In 2007, the house was sold by the Romberg family to Victoria Grounds, the daughter of Roy and Betty Grounds, who opened the house for public viewing in 2019 for the first time. The previous year, Grounds' daughter was awarded with a Mornington Peninsula Heritage Award that restored the house through use of authentic replacement materials to bring the house to a habitable standard from a derelict state.

== Description ==
The Ramsay House is a small 70-square-metre (753 sq ft) timber-framed, weatherboard building with low-pitched malthoid tiled gable roofs. The house follows a simple linear plan, one room wide, over three levels. The walls were finished in bagged hessian walls, with terracotta flooring. and timber-lined ceilings.

The Ramsay House is the last in a series of buildings influenced by Californian architect William Wurster, designed by Grounds during the time he shared a practice with Geoffrey Mewton. Other Grounds buildings from this period that share similar qualities are Lyncroft (1935), in Shoreham, the house at Chateau Tahbilk (1936), and the demolished Pirani House (1936) in Mount Eliza. These buildings introduced a form of modernism that articulated vernacular styling with a minimalist approach to detailing and ornament and the use and expression of natural materials. They were longitudinal in form and conformed to the topography of their sites which was expressed in split level planning and complex interlocking forms of various heights.

== See also ==
- Architecture of Melbourne
- List of places on the Victorian Heritage Register in the Shire of Mornington Peninsula
- Ranelagh Estate
