= Railey =

Railey may refer to:

Places

- Railey Creek, stream in Stone County, Missouri

People

- Isham Railey McConnell (born 1916), American architect who studied under Frank Lloyd Wright
- Jordan Railey (born 1992), American professional basketball player
- Paige Railey (born 1987), American sailor who races in the Laser Radial division
- Zach Railey (born 1984), American sailor and silver medallist at the 2008 Summer Olympics

== See also ==
- Raley
- Riley (disambiguation)
