= Ranelagh Estate =

Heritage-listed real estate subdivision in Melbourne, Victoria, Australia

- Location of the estate in Greater Metropolitan Melbourne
- Interactive map of the Ranelagh Estate area

General information
- Status: Completed
- Type: Real estate subdivision
- Architectural style: Garden suburb
- Location: Mount Eliza Way, Mount Eliza, Mornington Peninsula, Melbourne, Victoria, Australia
- Coordinates: 38°11′13″S 145°05′25″E
- Completed: 1924; 102 years ago

Design and construction
- Architects: Walter Burley Griffin; Marion Mahony Griffin
- Developer: John E. Taylor
- Services engineer: Saxil Tuxen and Miller

Victorian Heritage Register
- Official name: Ranelagh Estate
- Type: Registered place
- Designated: 12 May 2005
- Reference no.: H1605
- Heritage overlay no.: HO131
- Categories: Parks, Gardens and Trees; Landscape - Cultural

Register of the National Estate
- Official name: Ranelagh Estate
- Type: Defunct register
- Reference no.: 103168

The Ranelagh Estate, or more simply, Ranelagh, is a garden suburb real estate subdivision located adjacent to Mount Eliza Way, in Mount Eliza, on the Mornington Peninsula, in the south eastern suburbs of Melbourne, in Victoria, Australia. Designed by Walter Burley Griffin and his wife, Marion, in conjunction with Tuxen and Miller, the prestige estate was established in the 1920s, was initially slow, and flourished from the 1960s and 1970s as an exclusive estate of holiday houses.

The estate was added to the Victorian Heritage Register on 12 May 2005 in recognition of its historical and aesthetic significance; and was also added to non-statutory lists by the Victorian branch of the National Trust and the now defunct Register of the National Estate on unknown dates.

== History ==
The area now occupied by the Ranelagh Estate was once the site of parliamentarian, publican and landowner, John Thomas Smith’s Nyora summer house and farm (1855), later Nyora Estate. The house Nyora, was later owned by the notable advocate James Liddell Purves, and remained in private hands until purchased from the Slaney family. After Henry Slaney’s death, the land around Nyora was sold to John E. Taylor, an investor and timber merchant who formed the Sequoia Estate Co. Pty. Ltd. to develop the Ranelagh Estate.

In the Interwar period, Taylor set about developing a residential subdivision based on a country club concept with the homestead retained as the guest house. The Griffins and surveyors, Saxil Tuxen and Miller, were engaged to prepare a subdivision plan. The Ranelagh Estate was envisaged as a place where professional people would build their holiday houses with recreational facilities, parks and internal reserves provided. Each purchaser was automatically a member of the Ranelagh Club which was the custodian for the reserves and parks. Purchasers were encouraged to buy double blocks and the total number of purchasers was envisaged to be about 400. Sale of allotments started in February 1926, but land sales were slow and in 1928 the Club extended its membership to non-landholders. The estate developed slowly until the 1960s and 1970s, when Mount Eliza became increasingly suburban.

An association of residents was formed in the 1950s which liaised with the Council and fought against development proposals. The Ranelagh Residents Association became active again in the 1980s with the emergence of further threats of development to the nature reserves.

== Description ==
The Ranelagh Estate is a subdivision of approximately 800 blocks and an initial thirteen nature reserves, (Note: Subsequently reduced through subdivision, private development, and sporting and community use.) bounded by Port Phillip, Canadian Bay Road, Mount Eliza Way, the Nepean Highway and Earimil Creek. The Estate was sympathetically designed by the Griffins in 1924 to complement the natural beauty of the hilly terrain nestled between coast and bushland. His long curved streets provide a view of trees and greenery, rather than bitumen and concrete. The estate consists of single and double-storey houses situated on spacious blocks. Amongst these properties are a number of individually significant houses and gardens. There is a mixture of well-maintained native and traditional private gardens that complement the surrounding natural beauty.

Among its notable features were a curvilinear street layout, set along contours, and the unique concept of private communal parks located behind each of the main house lots, with the stated intention of use for ‘various purposes of recreation, play, child education, training and social gatherings’. The estate is a fine example of a residential subdivision designed to harmonise with the topography and indigenous vegetation of the area. The environmental concerns and principles evident in the design were ahead of their time. The design of the estate, through its layout, vistas, and planting, responds to the natural beauty of the area and to its preservation, in particular the cliffs, the bay and Earimil Creek. The internal reserves, providing both a haven for indigenous vegetation and wildlife as well as safe and natural playgrounds for children, embody the principles espoused by the Griffins.

Ranelagh Estate is of aesthetic significance for its important landscape planting in the rare alternate avenue of Monterey Cypress (Cupressus macrocarpa) and Tuart (Eucalyptus gomphocephala) along Wimbledon Avenue from Blue Ridge Lane to Ravenscourt Crescent. The trees have grown to enclose the avenue creating an impressive evergreen 'tunnel'. A row of Tuart trees also grows along the south side of Rosserdale Crescent and a stand grows in the Crescent triangle. The Rannoch Avenue traffic island features a stand of Monterey pines and a Golden Cypress, while on the nature strip are three fine Cupressus glabra 'Hodginsii' selected by Hodgins Nursery Essendon in about 1936.

=== Notable structures ===
The following structures, located within the estate, are separately listed on the Victorian Heritage Register:

- The Ship, at 35 Rannock Avenue, designed by Roy Grounds in 1935 as his family's holiday home
- Ramsay House, at 29 Rendlesham Avenue, also designed by Grounds, for Alice Bettine (Betty) Ramsay in 1937 as a beach house

== See also ==
- Architecture of Melbourne
- List of places on the Victorian Heritage Register in the Shire of Mornington Peninsula
