= Ramsey =

Ramsey may refer to:

== Companies ==
- Ramsey (retailer), Turkish clothing retailer

== People ==
- Ramsey (given name), including a list of people with the given name
- Ramsey (surname), including a list of people with the surname
- Baron de Ramsey, a title in the Peerage of the United Kingdom, including a list of the barons

== Places ==
=== Antarctica ===
- Ramsey Glacier, Ross Dependency, Antarctica

=== British Isles ===
- Ramsey, Cambridgeshire, England
  - Ramsey (constituency), a former constituency
- Ramsey, Essex, England
  - Ramsey and Parkeston, formerly Ramsey, a civil parish
- Ramsey, Isle of Man
  - Ramsey Bay
- Ramsey Island, Wales

=== Canada ===
- Ramsey, Ontario
- Ramsey Lake, Ontario

=== United States ===
- Ramsey, California
- Ramsey, Illinois
- Ramsey, Indiana
- Ramsey, Minnesota
- Ramsey, Mower County, Minnesota
- Ramsey, New Jersey
- Ramsey, Ohio
- Ramsey, Virginia
- Ramsey, West Virginia
- Ramsey County, Minnesota
- Ramsey County, North Dakota
- Ramsey Township, Fayette County, Illinois
- Ramsey Township, Kossuth County, Iowa

== Schools ==
- Ramsey Grammar School, Ramsey, Isle of Man
- Ramsey High School, New Jersey, U.S.
- The Ramsey Academy, Halstead, Essex, England

== Science and technology ==
- Ramsey theory, a branch mathematics
- Ramsey's theorem, in combinatorics
- Ramsey, an Amiga custom chip

== Ships ==
- HMS Ramsey, the name of several Royal Navy ships
- SS The Ramsey, a passenger steamship sunk in the First World War
- USS Ramsey, a U.S. Navy frigate

== Sport ==
- Ramsey A.F.C., a football club on the Isle of Man
- Ramsey R.U.F.C., a rugby team on the Isle of Man

== See also ==
- Ramsay (disambiguation)
- Ramsey House (disambiguation)
- Ramsey railway station (disambiguation)
- Ramzi (disambiguation)
- Rasey, a surname
- Ramsey Abbey, near Ramsey, Cambridgeshire, England
- Ramsey Center, in Cullowhee, North Carolina, U.S.
- Ramsey Mill and Old Mill Park, Hastings, Minnesota, U.S.
- Ramsey Windmill, Essex, England
