= Mount Eliza, Victoria =

Mount Eliza
- Suburb
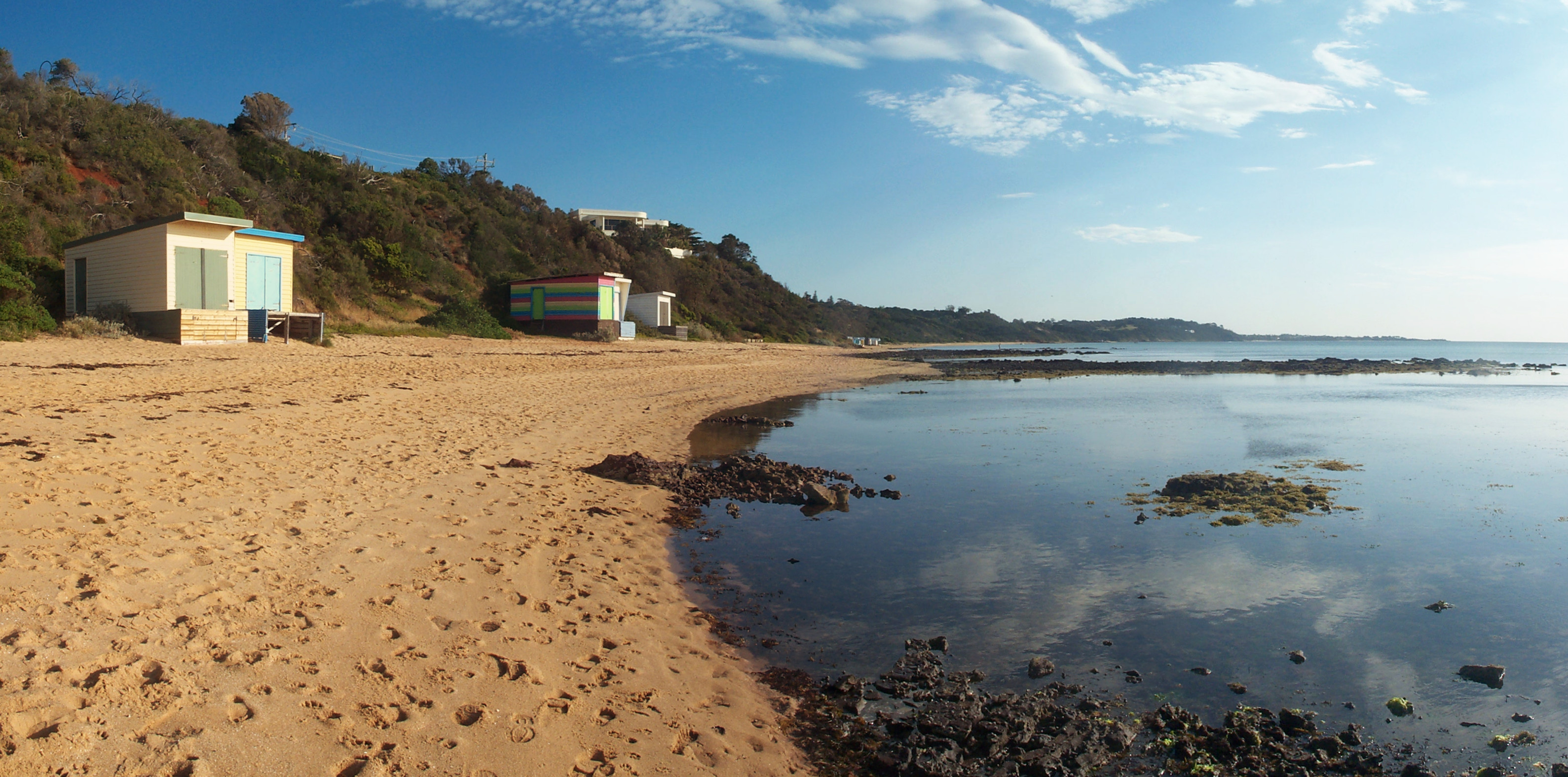
- Earimil Beach

- Interactive map of Mount Eliza
- Coordinates: 38.189°S 145.092°E
- Country: Australia
- State: Victoria
- City: Melbourne
- LGA: Shire of Mornington Peninsula
- Location: 42 km (26 mi) from Melbourne city centre; 7 km (4.3 mi) from Frankston
- Established: 1836

Government
  - State electorate: Mornington
  - Federal divisions: Dunkley; Flinders

Area
  - Total: 23 km^{2} (8.9 sq mi)

Population
  - Total: 18,734 (2021 census)
  - Density: 815/km^{2} (2,110/sq mi)
- Time zone: UTC+10 (AEST)
  - Summer (DST): UTC+11 (AEDT)
- Postcode: 3930
Suburbs around Mount Eliza
Port Phillip	Port Phillip	Frankston South
Port Phillip	Mount Eliza	Baxter
Mornington	Mornington	Moorooduc

Mount Eliza is a seaside suburb on the Mornington Peninsula in Melbourne, Victoria, Australia, 42 km (26 mi) south-east of Melbourne's Central Business District, located within the Shire of Mornington Peninsula local government area. Mount Eliza recorded a population of 18,734 at the 2021 census.

== History ==
The traditional Boonwurrung name for the mount is Berringwallin. The mount was given its European name in 1836 after Captain William Hobson's wife, Eliza Elliott.

Prior to large scale subdivision, Mount Eliza was mainly a location for holiday homes, with the Mount Eliza Post Office opening on 15 November 1920. This began to change in the early half of the 20th century when many old estates were subdivided. The subdivision of John Thomas Smith’s Nyora summer house and farm (1855), that created the Ranelagh Estate, designed in 1924 by Walter Burley Griffin and his wife, Marion, in tandem with the surveyors Saxil Tuxen and Miller.

Daveys Bay was named after James Davey who constructed a jetty in the 1840s to ship his produce to Melbourne. In 1909 the Daveys Bay Yacht Club was established, and winds its way to a walking track overlooking Mount Eliza Beach on the shores of Canadian Bay, which was named after three Canadians who owned a sawmill in the area in the 1950s. In 1928, the independent girls school, Toorak College, was built and is one of the oldest independent girls' schools in Victoria. By the 1950s the shopping precinct began to develop and by the 1960s was a well established shopping village. In 1959 when Fred Astaire, Gregory Peck, and Ava Gardner arrived to shoot the Stanley Kramer film, On The Beach, based on the novel of the same name by British novelist Nevil Shute, who had lived at nearby Langwarrin.

=== Morning Star Estate ===
Adjacent to Sunnyside beach sits Sunnyside, a distinctive Victorian-era mansion built as a rural or holiday retreat, that incorporates an eclectic mix of Victorian Tudor and Victorian Rustic Gothic architectural styles. The Sunnyside estate, now known as the Morning Star Estate, was purchased by Francis Alfred Gillett in 1865, a short time after he arrived in the colony in 1853 from London. Gillett designed the Sunnyside mansion sometime around 1867–1870.

In 1932 the property was purchased, with funds from a bequest, by the Catholic Church and became known as Morning Star Boys' Home. The boys’ home was developed into a country-training centre for delinquent boys, giving them exposure to the benefits of rural life. The boys later became involved in an extensive building program, which led to further developments of the property. Despite this, the mansion remained the dominant architectural feature of the property. Renovations and extensions were undertaken by the Franciscans in 1944–1946. Some effort to follow the lead of the mansion was made in the external Victorian Tudor/Gothic detailing of the large chapel. A number of courtyards were formed by the new buildings, including a large courtyard which was used for sports and was later enclosed. The remains of a football field lie to the south of the building complex, and a tall angular concrete pillar near the Nepean Highway originally carried a statue of the Virgin Mary, sculpted by one of the Franciscan brothers. The home closed in 1975.

The property was subsequently used as a horse stud before being purchased from receivers in 1993 for c.A$2.25 million. The 63-hectare (156-acre) property, with a 12-hectare (30-acre) vineyard, five-bedroom mansion, a 20-room hotel, a restaurant, cellar door, a helipad, and wedding, function and conference facilities – with a development permit for a 72-room hotel – was listed for sale in 2017 with expectations of $30 million. The Morning Star estate is also home to possibly the largest rose garden in Victoria, with 75,000 rose bushes, and the gardens surrounding the main mansion are home to more than 700 varieties of ornamental roses. A number of films were shot on the estate, including the movie Partisan, starring French actor Vincent Cassel, over three months during 2013 and 2014; and the mansion was used as a location for the Kath & Kim movie spin-off Kath & Kimderella.

=== Heritage listings ===
The following places in Mount Eliza are listed on the Victorian Heritage Register:

- Camp Manyung, also known as the Manyung Recreation Camp, 35 Sunnyside Road
- Hendra, 11 Willams Road
- Marathon, 12 Marathon Drive
- Moondah Gatehouse, 60–70 Kunyung Road (Note: The mansion is not listed on the Victorian Heritage Register, just the gatehouse.)
- Norman Lodge, known as Manyung between 1863 and 1947, at 1125 Nepean Highway
- Ramsay House, 29 Rendlesham Avenue
- Ranelagh Estate, Mt Eliza Way
- St James the Less Church, 105 Koetong Parade
- The Ship, 35 Rannock Avenue

== Geography ==
The suburb is bordered by Kackeraboite Creek, Humphries Road, Moorooduc Highway, Wooralla Drive, the Mornington railway line, Oakbank Road, Manyung Creek, and Port Phillip.

There are several beaches and bays located in Mount Eliza, which include Canadian Bay, Daveys Bay, Half Moon Bay, Moondah Beach, Ranelagh Beach, and Sunnyside North Beach. In addition Mount Eliza is also home to the Moorooduc Quarry Flora and Fauna Reserve and several creeks including Ballar Creek, Earimil Creek (formerly Dennant Creek), Gunyong Creek, Kackeraboite Creek, Manmangur Creek and Manyung Creek (named after the Manyung Fault).

== Mount Eliza Village ==
The suburb's main shopping area is known as Mount Eliza Village. It is situated at the intersection of Canadian Bay Road and Mount Eliza Way.

Two major supermarkets can be found along with many specialty shops. There is a range of restaurants and simple cafes in the village.

== Education ==
=== Secondary schools ===
- Peninsula Grammar
- Toorak College
- Mount Eliza Secondary College

=== Primary schools ===
- Kunyung Primary School
- Mount Eliza Primary School
- Mount Eliza North Primary School
- St. Thomas More Catholic Primary School
- Peninsula Grammar
- Toorak College

=== Kindergartens ===
- Toorak College Preschool
- Peninsula Grammar Early Childhood Centre
- Guardian Early Learning Centre Mt Eliza
- Mt Eliza Preschool
- Kunyung Preschool
- Woodlands Early Learning Centre
- Walkers Road Preschool
- Mt Eliza House Childcare & Early Learning Centre
- Little Grasshoppers Early Learning Centre Coolstores

There is also another child care centre being built on 1412 Nepean Highway, Mount Eliza VIC 3930 designed by Rauhous

== Sport ==
There are many sporting clubs in Mount Eliza, but most notable is the Mount Eliza Football Club competing in the Mornington Peninsula Nepean Football League.

Mt Eliza Cricket Club which is one of the most successful Cricket Clubs on the Mornington Peninsula with ten First Eleven premierships and a total of more than 55, including the Juniors. During the 1980s the club was heralded as the largest cricket club in Australia with nine senior teams and eight junior teams.

Mount Eliza Soccer Club was formed in 2008 and has grown rapidly. They cater for all age groups and have approximately 500 members. The club competes in both the Football Federation Victoria Metropolitan League and Bayside League.

Mornington Peninsula Pony Club provides dressage, show jumping and cross-country facilities for young equestrian enthusiasts. The club is affiliated with the Pony Club Association of Victoria.

Other sporting clubs include the Mount Eliza Bowls club, the Mount Eliza Tennis Club and the Peninsula Old Boys Football Club which compete in the VAFA.

Davey's Bay Yacht Club is located in Mount Eliza. The club celebrated its centenary in 2009.

Mount Eliza Skate Park, located in Emil Madsen Reserve, Wooralla Drive, opened in 2012.

== Mount Eliza Fire Brigade ==
Mount Eliza is served by a volunteer fire brigade, part of the Country Fire Authority. The station responds to approximately 250 calls a year within the local area, supporting neighbouring brigades and further afield in the event of large bush fires. The brigade currently has three vehicles, a Scania Type 3 Medium Pumper, a medium tanker for rural fires and a Forward Control Vehicle. Mount Eliza Fire Brigade is part of District 8.

== Transport ==
Mount Eliza is served by two major roadways, the Nepean Highway and Moorooduc Highway.

The Melbourne bus routes 772, 773, 781, 784, 785 & 788 also serve the area.

== Notable people ==
- Reg Ansett, businessman
- Billy Brownless, AFL football player
- Sir Edgar Coles and Dame Mabel Coles, businessman associated with the early establishment of the Coles Group
- Sir Christian Gigulito
- Rob Hulls, Labor state politician
- Greg Hunt, Liberal federal politician
- Simon Hussey, songwriter-arranger, record producer and audio engineer

== See also ==
- City of Frankston (former) – Parts of Mount Eliza were previously within this former local government area
- Shire of Mornington – Parts of Mount Eliza were previously within this former local government area
- Simon House, Mount Eliza
- Sunnyside North Beach
