= Ramsay =

Ramsay may refer to:

== People ==
- Ramsay (surname), people named Ramsay
- Ramsay (nobility), a Finnish and Swedish noble family
- Clan Ramsay, a Scottish clan
- Ramsay brothers, Indian film makers
- Richard Sorge (1895–1944), Soviet spy codenamed "Ramsay"

== Places ==
=== Australia ===
- Ramsay, Queensland, a locality in the Toowoomba Region
- Ramsay, South Australia, a locality on the Yorke Peninsula
- Electoral district of Ramsay, South Australia

=== Canada ===
- Ramsay, Calgary, Alberta, a residential neighbourhood

=== United States ===
- Ramsay, Montana, a small settlement west of Butte
- Ramsay, an unincorporated community in Bessemer Township, Michigan
- Ramsay (Greenwood, Virginia), a historical estate

=== Moon ===
- Ramsay (crater), an impact crater

== In fiction ==
- Ramsay Bolton, a character in the A Song of Ice and Fire series of fantasy novels by American author George R. R. Martin, and its television adaptation
- Ramsay family in the Australian soap opera Neighbours
  - Henry Ramsay (Neighbours)
- Ramsay Street, a fictional street in the Australian soap opera Neighbours
- Cris Ramsay, a house pen name used by Aaron S. Rosenberg and others for tie-in novels for the television series Eureka

== Other uses ==
- USS Ramsay (DD-124), a U.S. Navy destroyer in World War I
- Ramsay (publishing house), French publishing house, later acquired by Éditions Régine Deforges and Éditions Michel Lafon
- Ramsay Malware, a cyber espionage framework and toolkit

== See also ==
- Ramsay principle, a rule in UK tax law
- Ramsay House (disambiguation)
- Ramsey (disambiguation)
- Ramzi, a masculine given name and surname of Arabic origin
