= The Ship (house) =

Heritage-listed house in Melbourne, Victoria, Australia

- Location of the house in Greater Metropolitan Melbourne
- Interactive map of the The Ship area

General information
- Status: Completed
- Type: House
- Architectural style: International; Inter-war Functionalist
- Location: 35 Rannock Avenue, Mount Eliza, Mornington Peninsula, Melbourne, Victoria, Australia
- Coordinates: 38°10′36″S 145°04′59″E
- Year built: 1934–1935
- Completed: 1935; 91 years ago
- Client: Self

Technical details
- Material: Timber; fibrous cement; bricks; aluminium; glass

Design and construction
- Architect: Roy Grounds

Victorian Heritage Register
- Official name: The Ship
- Type: Registered place
- Designated: 21 October 2000
- Reference no.: H1910
- Heritage overlay no.: HO216
- Category: Residential buildings (private)

Register of the National Estate
- Official name: The Ship
- Type: Defunct register
- Designated: undated
- Reference no.: 103161

The Ship is a house located at 35 Rannock Avenue in Mount Eliza, on the Mornington Peninsula, in the south eastern suburbs of Melbourne, in Victoria, Australia.

Built in 1935 on the traditional lands of the Bunurong people, the house was added to the Victorian Heritage Register on 21 October 2000 in recognition of its architectural significance and was also added to the non-statutory and now defunct Register of the National Estate on an unknown date.

== History ==
The Ship was designed by Roy Grounds for his own family while he was working in association with Geoffrey Mewton, shortly after both had returned from visits to Europe and America. The seaside cottage was to be located on a north-facing site overlooking Port Phillip in the Ranelagh Estate. The Ship was designed as early as 1933, and before it was built was hailed in the magazine Home Beautiful in 1934 as an economical design, made up of prefabricated units in modern materials. It would be planned to meet modern needs with largely built-in furniture.

The house featured again in Home Beautiful in 1936 and was described as the 'Ship aground at Ranelagh'. The Ship was built between 1934 and 1935 and shows no prefabrication but rather is of conventional timber-frame construction. Nonetheless it clearly displays a number of features derived from both the European International and Inter-war Functionalist styles.

In a 1936 social column in The Adelaide Advertiser, a correspondent wrote, describing the house:

I paid a visit the other day to Melbourne's most original seaside house, a ship aground at Ranelagh, Frankston. It was designed and built by that very modern architect, Mr. Roy Grounds, the owner, who with his American wife has furnished it with equal taste.

It has porthole lighting, a spiral aluminium staircase to a deck penthouse above, designed as a sun-trap for the winter months, and there is a kitchen where the cook can cook her dinner without moving her feet from one spot. For everything is designed in the important region of the house to be within arm's length almost, beginning with the first item in cooking a dinner, and going on in order to dishing up at the door.

The nursery-bedroom has low walls and a small door that might have come from "Alice in Wonderland" (only there is no bottle to drink from to become smaller or too big), and the ceiling is blue with stars and a moon for the lighting scheme. Even the low corner windows are built so that children can look out at miles of Frankston landscape without having to stand on their toes or the window-sill.

— The Adelaide Advertiser, 23 April 1936

== Description ==
The smooth white walls of fibrous cement serve as the 'taut skin', and are given horizontal emphasis by the rounded cover strips. The low flat roofs, possibly a first in small scale domestic construction in Victoria, were originally decked in Malthoid. The nautical theme is most obvious in the massing which suggests a large motor launch, with the sleep-out as a 'bridge'. The decks to the fore and rear of the 'bridge' have ship-like rails and awning, and portholes (now removed) punctuate the 'hull' below. Otherwise the fenestration is dominated by the verticals of the mullions which follow the module of the timber frame. Windows of the smaller rooms are timber casements grouped on the corners. The living room features a long bank of French doors opposite the distinctive wide striped front door, which is a signature of Mewton & Grounds' work. The built in furniture amounts to various shelves, wardrobes and cupboards, a brick 'sofa' next to the simple brick fireplace and the bed in the master bedroom (since removed).

The influence of Willem Dudok shows in the stepped entrance alcove and the fireplace and chimney of white painted brickwork with deep raked horizontal joints. The influence of William Wurster shows in the planning, where the principal spaces are single room width rectangles butted together according to function, and also with a view to creating protected outdoor courts. The main internal space of The Ship combines living, dining and circulation functions with access off this space to kitchen, both bedrooms, and via a light metal spiral staircase, the glassed in sunroom with roof deck access.

=== Architectural significance ===
The Ship is of architectural significance as one the first, and one of the earliest remaining, residences in Victoria in which the principles of the International/Functionalist style were applied in the inter-war period. Both as a concept and as built, the house has consistently been accorded groundbreaking status in this style by a number of architectural historians and critics including Robin Boyd in Victorian Modern (1947), and subsequently by J. M. Freeland, Conrad Hamann, Philip Goad, and others.

As a singular work in the output of Mewton and Grounds – among the earliest architects in Victoria to work exclusively in the new modern idioms – The Ship stands out from their other two main streams of their work, dominated by the influence on Mewton of Willem Dudok, and on Grounds of William Wurster respectively. The Ship shows some influences from both of those strands. However, of their works, The Ship adheres most closely to the European International/Functionalist style connected with Walter Gropius and Le Corbésier, particularly in the representation of a taut skin over a regular frame.

The Ship is the earliest readily recognisable pre-World War II example of the International Style in a residence in the Mornington Peninsula, a region which was after the war to be renowned for the enthusiastic adoption of progressive styles in domestic architecture.

== See also ==
- Architecture of Melbourne
- List of places on the Victorian Heritage Register in the Shire of Mornington Peninsula
