= Rasey =

Rasey is a surname. Notable people with the surname include:

- Jean Rasey (born 1954), American actress
- Thomas Rasey (1898–1989), Australian politician
- Uan Rasey (1921–2011), American musician

== See also ==
- Raley
- Ramsey (disambiguation)
