= Henty House =

Heritage-listed house in Melbourne, Victoria, Australia

- Location of the house in Greater Metropolitan Melbourne
- Alternative names: Round House; Henty II

General information
- Status: Completed
- Type: Round house
- Architectural style: International style
- Location: 581 Nepean Highway, Frankston South, City of Frankston, Melbourne, Victoria, Australia
- Coordinates: 38°09′17″S 145°06′34″E
- Completed: 1953; 73 years ago
- Client: Mrs (Arthur Frederick) Henty

Technical details
- Material: Timber; glass; bricks

Design and construction
- Architect: Roy Grounds
- Main contractor: Norman Echberg

Victorian Heritage Register
- Official name: Round House
- Type: Registered place
- Designated: 1 April 1993
- Reference no.: H0966
- Heritage overlay no.: HO23
- Category: Residential buildings (private)

Henty House, commonly known as the Round House and rarely as Henty II, is a house that is round, located at 581 Nepean Highway in Frankston South, in the City of Frankston, in the south eastern suburbs of Melbourne, in Victoria, Australia.

Built in 1953 on the traditional lands of the Bunurong people, the house was added to the Victorian Heritage Register on 1 April 1993 in recognition of its historical and architectural significance; and was also added to a non-statutory list by the Victorian branch of the National Trust on 11 December 1991.

== History ==
In the mid-1930s, Mrs Arthur Frederick Henty commissioned Roy Grounds, an inexperienced architect in partnership with Geoffrey Mewton, to build her a large country house for her family, called 'Portland Lodge', located at 1 Plummer Avenue, Olivers Hill, in Frankston on the Mornington Peninsula. This simple, straightforward modern house, sometimes called "Henty I", was awarded the gold medal of the Royal Victorian Institute of Architecture in c. 1939.

Following the death of her husband in the early 1950s, Mrs Henty again commissioned Grounds to design a timber-clad house on the Nepean Highway site in 1953. By this time, Grounds was an influential and innovative practitioner of Modernist architecture in Australia and its adaptation to regional conditions. The house was built by Norman Echberg, a local builder, who had worked with Grounds on other projects.

The house demonstrates creative accomplishment in the history of architecture in Victoria; it is an extraordinary example of Grounds' work; and it has strong associations with an important cultural group, namely progressive Melbourne architects of the 1950s. The house was so highly thought of at the time of its construction that the internationally renowned Bauhaus architect Walter Gropius travelled to Frankston specifically to see it during a lecture tour of Australia in 1954. A favourable review of the house was published by The Sydney Morning Herald in 1954, titled "A Round House Set On A Hill Like A Nest".

Subsequent owners of the house were Robert Brennan, a company director, and his wife, Edna, from 1958–1959 until after 1967.

== Description ==
The Henty House is one of the best known examples of the 1950s interest in simple geometries in form and plan amongst a small but innovative group of Melbourne architects. The Henty House's geometry fully exploits the views and topography of the prominent site. The house was round to suit an all-round sea view, part of its perimeter open, as balcony, and part closed, as rooms. The roof eaves were angled to shield from the summer sun and admit winter sun and, at the roof's centre, was a cylindrical painted brick chimney with cowl. All exterior service pipes were concealed in the wall cavity, creating a clean exterior look to the dwelling.

The house's location on the Mornington Peninsula places it amongst a number of houses of progressive design of the 1950s in this region. The house is a crucial part of Ground's domestic geometric projects and buildings which also included triangular and square houses. These domestic geometric buildings informed the design of some of Ground's well known institutional buildings notably the Australian Academy of Science building in Canberra (1958–1959) and the Victorian Arts Centre in Melbourne (1959–1981).

The Henty House is essentially intact although its visual prominence has been reduced by subdivision of the original site and construction of a house on this adjoining site.

== See also ==
- Architecture of Melbourne
- List of places on the Victorian Heritage Register in the City of Frankston
