= Ramsey railway station =

Ramsey railway station, or Ramsey station, may refer to:

- Ramsey railway station (Manx Electric Railway), a station in Ramsey on the Isle of Man
- Ramsey railway station (Isle of Man Railway), a disused station in Ramsey on the Isle of Man
- Ramsey railway station (Ontario), a sign post station stop in Ramsey, Ontario, Canada
- Ramsey station (Metro Transit), a rail station of Metro Transit in Ramsey, Minnesota, USA
- Ramsey station (NJ Transit), a rail station of New Jersey Transit on Main Street in Ramsey, New Jersey, USA

== See also ==
- Ramsey East railway station, a disused station in Ramsey, Cambridgeshire, England
- Ramsey North railway station, a disused station in Ramsey, Cambridgeshire, England
- Ramsey Route 17 station, a rail station of New Jersey Transit on Route 17 in Ramsey, New Jersey, USA
- Ramsey (disambiguation), for other articles with Ramsey in their title
