= Ramsay House =

Ramsay House may refer to:

In Australia

- Ramsay House, Mount Eliza, on the Mornington Peninsula, Melbourne, Victoria, listed on the Victorian Heritage Register

In the United States

- Ramsay-McCormack Building, Birmingham, Alabama, listed on the NRHP in Birmingham, Alabama
- Ramsay-Durfee Estate, Los Angeles, California, listed on the NRHP in California
- Ronald and Dorcas Ramsay House, Atchison, Kansas, listed on the NRHP in Atchison County, Kansas
- Ralph Ramsay House, Richfield, Utah, formerly listed on the listed on the NRHP in Sevier County, Utah
- Ramsay (Greenwood, Virginia), listed on the NRHP in Virginia
- Ramsay House (Ellensburg, Washington), listed on the NRHP in Kittitas County, Washington

== See also ==
- Ramsey House (disambiguation)
