= R. W. B. Lewis =

American literary scholar and critic (1917 - 2002)

Richard Warrington Baldwin Lewis (November 1, 1917 – June 13, 2002) was an American literary scholar and critic. He gained a wider reputation when he won a 1976 Pulitzer Prize for Biography or Autobiography, the first National Book Critics Circle Award for nonfiction, and a Bancroft Prize for his biography of Edith Wharton. The New York Times called the book "a beautifully wrought, rounded portrait of the whole woman, including the part of her that remained in shade during her life" and said that the "expansive, elegant biography ... can stand as literature, if nothing else."

He was the Neil Gray Professor of English and American Studies at Yale University, where he taught from 1959 until his retirement in 1988; from 1966 to 1972, he was master of Yale's Calhoun College. From 1954 to 1959 he taught at Rutgers–Newark. In 1988 Lewis received a Litt.D. from Bates College. A member of the American Academy of Arts & Sciences, Lewis received its Gold Medal for Biography in 2000.

Lewis is generally considered one of the founders of the academic field of American Studies. His interests ranged from criticism of American and European writers to biography and artistic criticism. He is associated with John William Ward.

Lewis' career as critic involved him in the lives of many influential American and European thinkers and writers. Lewis received his doctoral degree from the University of Chicago, where he studied under Norman Maclean, author of the novel A River Runs Through It and Other Stories. He and his wife and sometime co-author Nancy later became close friends with Southern writer Robert Penn Warren.

Lewis' first major work The American Adam: Innocence, Tragedy, and Tradition in the Nineteenth Century (1955) explored De Crèvecœur's idea of the American as a "new man" — an innocent Adam in a bright new world dissociating himself from the historic past. Lewis portrayed this preoccupation as a pervasive, transforming ingredient of the American mind that shaped the consciousness of lesser thinkers as fully as it shaped the giants of the age. The book traces the Adamic theme in the writings of Ralph Waldo Emerson, Henry David Thoreau, Hawthorne, Herman Melville, Henry James and others, and in his epilogue Lewis exposes its continuing spirit in the works of F. Scott Fitzgerald, William Faulkner, Ralph Ellison, J. D. Salinger, and Saul Bellow.

== Life and career ==
Lewis was born in Chicago, Illinois, the son of Beatrix Elizabeth (Baldwin) and Leicester Crosby Lewis, an Episcopal minister. After preparing at Episcopal Academy and Phillips Exeter Academy, he earned his B.A. in 1939 at Harvard University and his M.A. in 1941 at the University of Chicago, where he also received a Ph.D. degree in 1954. In the meantime he volunteered for war service in 1942, enlisting as a private in the U.S. Air Force and becoming a second lieutenant, serving in the Middle East, North Africa, and Italy, commanding a unit in Tuscany, Italy, serving in the British-U.S. intelligence service known as "M.I. X" and receiving the Legion of Merit Award in 1944 for service behind enemy lines, After the war, he continued as a commanding officer of the Northern Italy War Crimes Investigation Team and was discharged from service in 1946 with the rank of major.

After returning from the war Lewis pursued his fascination with world literature, which was already awakened by his Harvard teachers. He also developed a lifelong fascination and love for Italy after visiting as a child, and serving there in the war. He and his wife Nancy visited there regularly for much of their lives, and Lewis later wrote a book on the city of Florence.

Lewis taught at Bennington College 1948–1950, and was dean of studies at the Salzburg Seminar in Austria 1950–1951. He was a visiting lecturer at Smith College 1951–1952 and a resident fellow at Princeton University in 1952–1954, then joined the faculty at Rutgers University as a professor of English until his Yale University appointment in 1959. In 1977 he was appointed the Neil Gray, Jr. Professor of English and American Studies, reflecting his abiding interest in American literature and American cultural life.

=== Honors ===
Lewis received numerous honors for his research and contributions, including a grant for literary achievement from the National Institute of Arts and Letters, an American Council of Learned Societies Fellowship, plus honorary degrees from several universities. He was invited to serve on both the National Book Award jury for fiction, on which he was charged with selecting the best novel of 1964, and on the 1977 jury for biography and autobiography. In 1988 he was one of 14 scholars chosen to advise the National Endowment for the Humanities on the state of American culture.

While teaching at Yale, Lewis lived in a house in Bethany, Connecticut. He worked in an octagonally-shaped writing studio situated in a ravine about 30 feet from his house. A railed walkway connected the house to the studio, which was built by Nancy Lewis' brother-in-law Isham McConnell, who studied under the American architect Frank Lloyd Wright. Lewis continued to write his books on a typewriter into his later years.

Bookshelves lined the walls of Lewis' office, with each section containing works from Lewis' various areas of research: the James' family, Edith Wharton, Dante and Italy, American literature, etc.

In 2006 the Yale College Writing Center was endowed with a directorship in Lewis' name.

"This position in Dick Lewis’ name will serve as a permanent tribute to a writer who made every subject he engaged in memorable and to a memorable teacher who made every student mindful of great writing,” said Yale President Richard C. Levin in a university press release.

=== Personal life ===
Lewis married Nancy Lindau in 1950. They had three children: Nathaniel (born 1960), who is also a literary historian at Saint Michael's College; Sophie (born 1965), a health expert with the government of Massachusetts; and Emma (born 1967), an environmental lawyer. Lewis also had a son by the Danish writer Elsa Gress, the historian David Gress.

Lewis died in Bethany, Connecticut.

== Works written ==
- The American Adam: Innocence, Tragedy, and Tradition in the Nineteenth Century (1955)
- The Picaresque Saint. Representative Figures in Contemporary Fiction (1959)
- Herman Melville (1962)
- Trials of the Word: Essays in American Literature and the Humanistic Tradition (1965)
- The Poetry of Hart Crane: A Critical Study (1967)
- American Literature: The Makers and the Making: Book C / 1861 to 1914 (1974, with Cleanth Brooks and Robert Penn Warren)
- Edith Wharton: A Biography (1975)
- The Jameses: A Family Narrative (1991)
- Literary Reflections : A Shoring of Images 1960-1993 (1993)
- The City of Florence: Historical Vistas and Personal Sightings (1995)
- American Characters: Selections from the National Portrait Gallery, Accompanied by Literary Portraits (1999, with Nancy Lewis)
- Dante (2001)

== Works edited ==
- Presence of Walt Whitman (1962)
- Malraux: A Collection of Critical Essays (1964)
- The Letters of Edith Wharton (1989, with Nancy Lewis)
- The Selected Short Stories of Edith Wharton (1991)
