= Mount Eliza Secondary College =

Coordinates: 38.1899°S 145.0913°E

Location
- 204 Canadian Bay Road; Mount Eliza, Victoria, 3930; Australia

Information
- Type: Public, co-educational, secondary
- Motto: Happy, Smart, Prepared
- Established: 1975
- Principal: Danielle Vaughan
- Years: 7 to 12
- Enrollment: 750
- Slogan: Educated for excellence, prepared for life
- Website: www.mesc.vic.edu.au

Mount Eliza Secondary College is a public co-educational secondary school located in Mount Eliza, Victoria, Australia. As of 2023 the school caters to approximately 750 students in years 7 to 12 from the local area. There is a range of course options in VCE, VCE VM and VET courses as well as combinations of each. It has an international programme bringing students to the school from abroad.

== About the school ==
The school's educational system is divided into two sub-schools, each focusing mainly on the two year levels assigned to them. In an attempt to increase the focus of students at Mount Eliza Secondary College, there is an enforced compulsory school uniform.

== History ==
Mount Eliza Secondary College was founded in 1975 with a staff of 16 teachers and just over 200 students. In 2015, the school celebrated 40 years since its opening.

== Houses ==
- Warringa, blue
- Manyung, red
- Kirrang, yellow
- Kimmuli, green
