= Lyncroft =

Heritage-listed house in Melbourne, Victoria, Australia

- Location of the house in Greater Metropolitan Melbourne

General information
- Status: Completed
- Type: House
- Architectural style: Inter-war Functionalist
- Location: 410 Tucks Road, Shoreham, Mornington Peninsula, Melbourne, Victoria, Australia
- Coordinates: 38°24′31″S 145°00′56″E
- Completed: 1935; 91 years ago
- Client: Anthony Hamilton
- Owner: Hamilton family (1927–c. 1982); Anita Ziemer and Geoff Slade (as of November 2022)

Technical details
- Material: Bagged concrete; timber; corrugated iron
- Grounds: 1.2 ha (3 acres)

Design and construction
- Architect: (Sir) Roy Grounds
- Architecture firm: Mewton and Grounds

Victorian Heritage Register
- Official name: Lyncroft
- Type: Registered place
- Designated: 21 December 2000
- Reference no.: H1909
- Heritage overlay no.: HO246
- Category: Residential buildings (private)

Register of the National Estate
- Official name: Lyncroft
- Type: Defunct register
- Reference no.: 102984

Lyncroft is a house at 410 Tucks Road, in Shoreham, on the Mornington Peninsula, in the south eastern suburbs of Melbourne, Australia.

Located on the traditional lands of the Bunurong people, the house was added to the Victorian Heritage Register on 21 December 2000 in recognition of its architectural significance; and, on an unknown date, was added to the non-statutory and now defunct Register of the National Estate.

== History ==
Augustas F. Jessop sold the property, without improvements, to Anthony Hamilton in c. 1927, and the Hamilton family retained ownership of the property until c. 1982. The house, Lyncroft was built in 1935, designed by Roy Burnham Grounds during his association with Geoffrey Mewton from 1933 to 1937. The work of Mewton and Grounds during this period took two main paths, one following the European International style and the other following the Bay Region or Shanty style of Californian architect William Wurster. Lyncroft is a fine Australian example of the American influence, and is one of a number of similar designs in this period by Mewton and Grounds and other architects that can be grouped together as having a common or idiomatic design approach, during the Inter-war Functionalist period.

== Description ==
The site for Lyncroft is high on a ridge and surrounded by windbreaks of mature pine and cypress. The homestead is set in a simple rectangular garden defined by concrete block walls on two sides, and by terracing on the south east which allows fine views to Westernport bay. The simple rectangular internal spaces are arranged in linear wings with informal combinations of gable and skillion roofs which relate to the functions within. The wings are arranged across the hilltop to take advantage of the aspect and environment. The planning also creates a variety of outdoor rooms which are further defined with terraces and verandahs or pergolas, and which address use at different times of day.

Lyncroft is a large six-bedroom home, set on one hectare (three acres), (Note: In the same source, there is reference to "…Slade spends most of his days at Lyncroft, whose 3.2 ha (8 acres) of vines provide grapes…") built as a collection of cottage style elements grouped together under separate pitched roofs. The unpretentious forms and cottage motifs, such as chimney pots, timber shutters and multi-paned windows, complemented by the cottage garden and vines, are a Picturesque composition. The design is a sophisticated response to the site, orientated to achieve good solar performance and stepping down the sloping site.

Lyncroft uses a limited palette of plain "as found" materials and finishes – concrete block made on site, weathered vertical boarding, corrugated iron roofing, bush pole verandah supports, and simple builders detailing. Ornament is reduced to a minimum. Within the generally modern design, Grounds saw no contradiction in adopting traditional forms such as gabled roofs and traditional elements such as French doors where they would work best. Similarly some of the openings in the masonry have segmental arched heads, and the corridor in one of the wings is subtly vaulted. Multi-paned windows with a Old Colonial Georgian flavour are used, but the windows are functionally arranged to frame valued views, create privacy and provide lighting and cross ventilation. Each of the main entries is given a unique personality through Mewton and Grounds signature stripe and zigzag patterning on the doors.

Lyncroft demonstrates design elements and the influence of Wurster and the International Style in its functional planning, picturesque massing, specific response to environment and client lifestyle, and use of simple materials and finishes. Grounds' use of forms and detailing as expressed at Lyncroft later became widespread in housing in bush areas on the fringes of Melbourne, and his design approach was continued in the postwar period in the work of architects such as Alistair Knox.

=== Design of Roy Grounds ===
Sir Roy Grounds was one of Australia's leading architects this century. Lyncroft was designed early in Grounds' career and it illustrates his interest in passive climate control and linking indoor and outdoor living. Very few architects were focussing on these issues in their design and it was not until after World War II that these ideas became widely adopted. Later in his career, from the 1940s onwards, Grounds' were often larger in scale and were dominated by a preoccupation with geometry and structure. He built houses which were circles or triangles in plan and, in 1940, designed the fan-shaped block of flats, Quamby, in Toorak. Another acclaimed geometric design was the 1959 Australian Academy of Science building in Canberra. The Victorian Arts Centre, opened in stages from 1967 onwards, was Grounds' grand design.

The Melbourne firm of Grounds, Romberg and Boyd was innovative and successful. The firm was the most prolific designers in the style of early modern architecture in Victoria, with examples in both suburban and rural contexts. Grounds also taught architecture and was a strong influence on the next generation of Melbourne architects, including Kevin Borland, Daryl Jackson, and Peter McIntyre.

== See also ==
- Architecture of Melbourne
- List of places on the Victorian Heritage Register in the Shire of Mornington Peninsula
