= Marr Grounds =

American/Australian artist and lecturer in architecture

Marr Grounds (21 October 1930 – 25 March 2021) was an American/Australian artist, known for his sculpture and environmental art, as an educational innovator in his career as lecturer in architecture, and as the co-founder of the Tin Sheds art workshop in Sydney.

== Early life and education ==
Grounds was born in Los Angeles, California on 21 October 1930, the son of architect Sir Roy Grounds and American divorcee Regina Lammers (née Virginia Marr). He came to Australia in 1933 with his mother and they lived near the outer-Melbourne suburb of Frankston, until 1939.

He and his mother left Australia for the US in 1939, after his father had taken up with the wife of Sir John Ramsay, son of William Ramsay, founder of Kiwi shoe polish. His parents were divorced in 1941. Grounds returned to stay with his father in 1945, after his mother remarried, until 1948. During those years he attended a cram school in Melbourne, now known as Taylors College.

He served in the U.S. Navy during the Korean War from 1951 to 1955.

He studied at the College of Environmental Design at the University of California, Berkeley, graduating with a degree in architecture in 1965, before undertaking a master of arts in sculpture the following year. The campus was at the centre of the 1960s counterculture, and Grounds became part of a friendship group that included some of the key figures of that time, such as Ken Kesey, Allen Ginsberg and Jack Kerouac, hanging out at the City Lights Bookstore. He moved to the commune of Drop City in Colorado for a while after graduating.

== Career ==
In 1996, he and his wife, Joan Grounds, moved to Ghana to lecture in architecture at the Kwame Nkrumah University of Science and Technology in Kumasi, after marrying at a quick ceremony at Reno, Nevada, as it was a requirement to be married to travel there.

After working in Ghana, he was offered a job by Robin Boyd to lecture in architecture at the University of Sydney, starting in 1968. Not long afterwards, he co-founded the art workshop Tin Sheds in the university grounds with Donald Brook and his wife Joan. There, a group of artists, architects, engineers, and others tried to understand and define the notion of art, staying open 24/7 as students were encouraged to dream and create all manner of artworks, focusing on conceptual art

Marr initiated the creation of the Avago gallery at Tin Sheds. This was a 600-millimetre (24 in) cube built into the wall facing onto City Road. Many artists held their first exhibitions at Avago. It gained notoriety after a copy of a Picasso painting that had been stolen from the National Gallery of Victoria was installed there, and it was later stolen from there again.

In 1987, he resigned from his lecturing job and returned to the U.S. to live, but returned three years later.

== Exhibitions ==
His art work was included in the following exhibitions:

- 1973, 1975 and 1978: included in the Mildura Sculpture Triennials
- 1975: first solo exhibition, Morphological structures, at Watters Gallery
- 1976: Biennale of Sydney at the Art Gallery of New South Wales, an installation called Second art bit installation, that included a sandbag bunker under a staircase, which Grounds "inhabited" with his two dogs Mutt and Pete
- 1981: inaugural Australian Perspecta
- 1981: inaugural [Australian] Sculpture Triennial
- 1981: sculpture exhibition in Toronto, Canada

== Recognition ==
Grounds was given a residency at the Cité internationale des arts in Paris in 1977, followed by one in New York, for which he was given time off from his lecturing job at Sydney University. After the exhibition in Toronto in 1918, he had another short studio residency in New York, and then a year-long residency at the Künstlerhaus Bethanien in Berlin, Germany, thanks to a grant from the Visual Arts Board.

== Personal life ==
He married artist Joan Grounds around 1966, but they divorced in the late 1970s.

He met renowned Australian artist Bonita Ely, the mother of his daughter, in 1981 in Toronto. Their daughter was born in Berlin, but was able to acquire American citizenship.

He renounced his American citizenship around 2005.

== Death and legacy ==
He died on 25 March 2021, aged 90, after living for some years on a property near Tanja, New South Wales, in a house with an environmental design reflecting his principles.
