= Isham Railey McConnell =

American architect (1916–2002)

Isham Railey McConnell (born 1916, Versailles, Kentucky; died October 26, 2002, Bedford, Massachusetts, aged 86) was an architect who studied for a year under Frank Lloyd Wright and later at the Massachusetts Institute of Technology (class of 1953).

== Early life and education ==
McConnell was born to John M. McConnell and Louise Sharon Railey in Versailles, Kentucky, where his family owned a large farm. He attended but dropped out of University of Kentucky and instead became a student of Frank Lloyd Wright in 1939, first at Taliesin in Spring Green, Wisconsin and later the same year at Taliesin West, Scottsdale, Arizona. He served in the Pacific during World War II as an Army engineer, enlisting in 1942. He began an architecture degree at the Massachusetts Institute of Technology in 1949. He met Judith Lindau in the class and they later married, a marriage that was to last until his death in 2002. They both graduated with the class of 1953. They later had a son, Laurance, and a daughter, Julia.

== Career ==
McConnell mainly designed contemporary homes, most of them in the Massachusetts towns of Bedford, Lexington, Concord, and Sudbury. A fit to the natural landscape, using only natural materials, with a strong emphasis on lighting were signature elements.

He designed an octagonal writing studio attached to the Bethany, Connecticut home of Judith's brother-in-law, Professor R. W. B. Lewis of Yale University. In the studio, Lewis wrote a biography of Edith Wharton for which he won the Pulitzer Prize. He held an architectural license until 1988.

He died October 26, 2002, at his Bedford, Massachusetts home, aged 86.

== Gallery ==
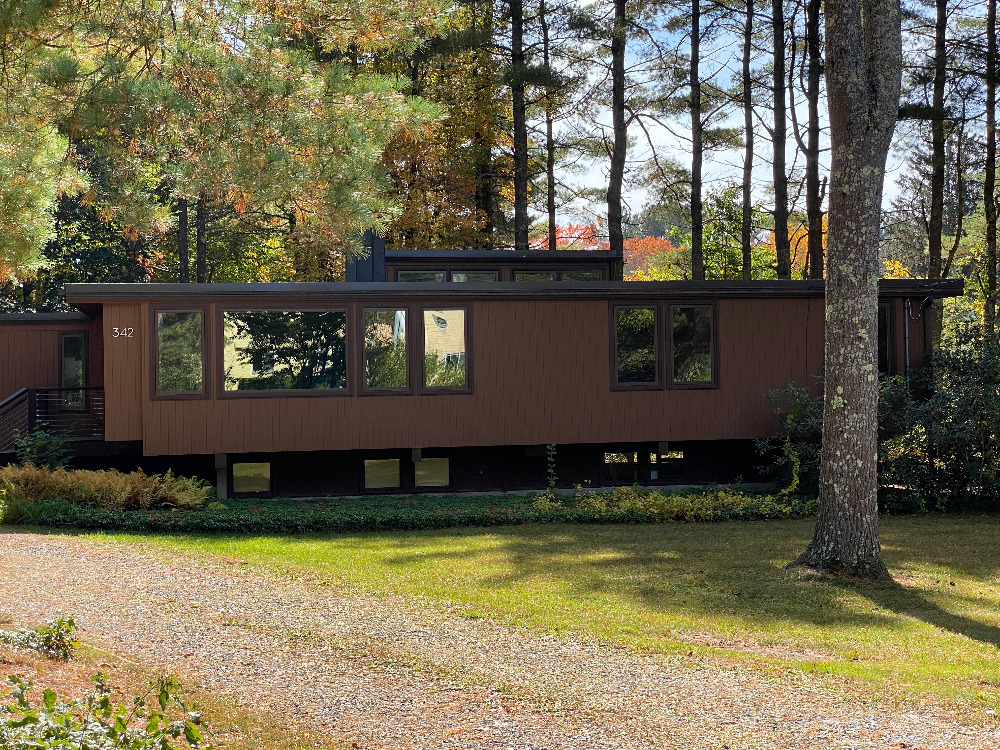
