= Roy Grounds =

Australian architect (1905–1981)

Sir Roy Burman Grounds
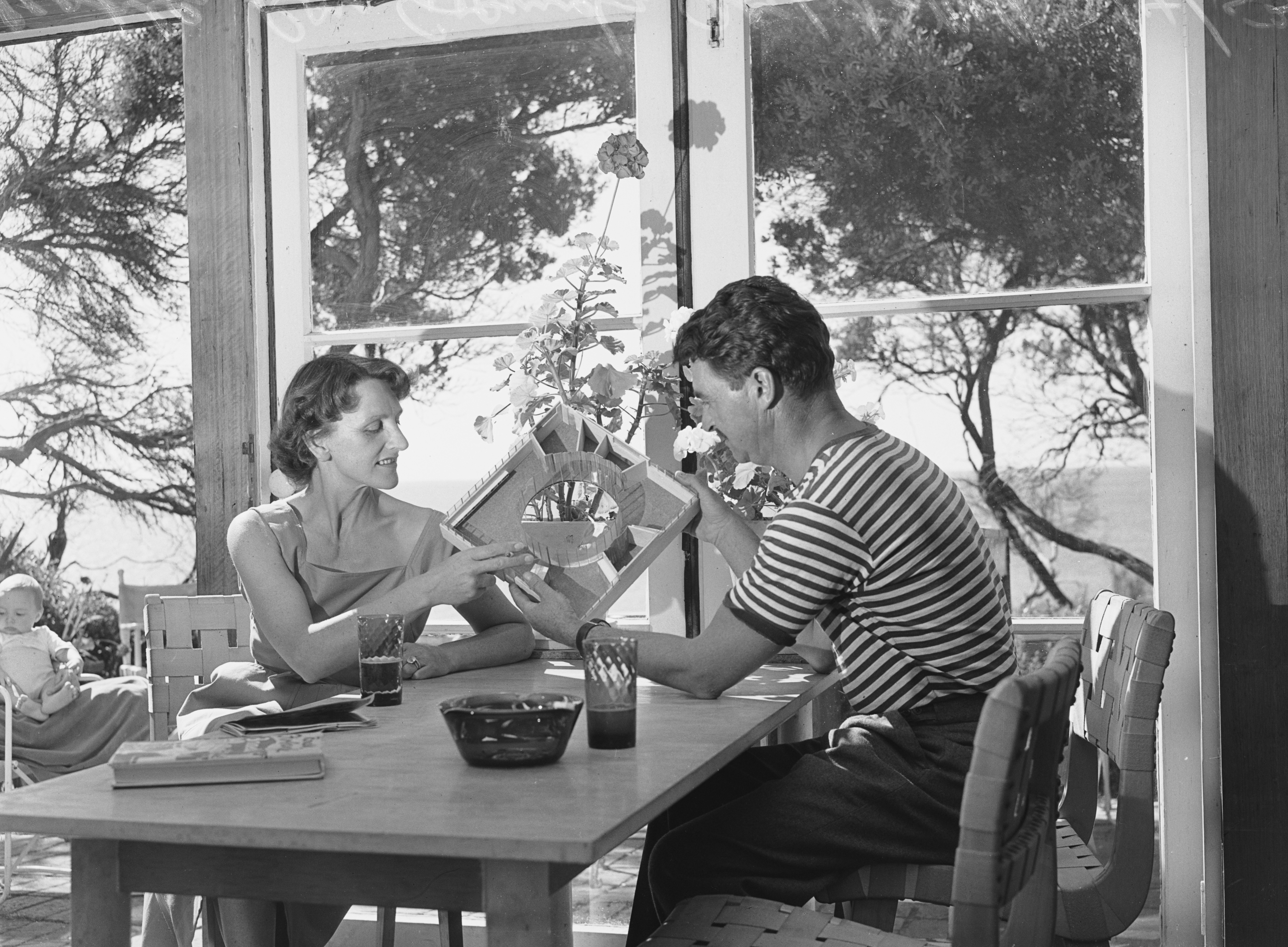
- Grounds at home with Betty Ramsay, 1953
- Born: 18 December 1905; Melbourne, Victoria, Australia
- Died: 2 March 1981 (aged 75); Parkville, Melbourne, Australia
- Education: Scotch College Melbourne; Melbourne Grammar School; University of Melbourne
- Occupation: Architect
- Years active: 1928—1981
- Spouses: Regina Marr (m. 1930; div. 1941); Betty Ramsay (m. 1941)
- Children: Marr Grounds; Victoria Grounds
- Awards: Victorian Architecture Medal (1954); ACT Meritorious Architecture Award (1959); Sir John Sulman Medal (1959); RAIA Gold Medal
- Practice: Grounds, Romberg and Boyd
- Buildings: National Gallery of Victoria; Victorian Arts Centre; Australian Academy of Science; Roy Grounds House; Wrest Point Hotel Casino

Sir Roy Burman Grounds (18 December 1905 – 2 March 1981) was an Australian architect, based in Melbourne, Victoria. He is noted as often being at the forefront of the development of Modernism in Victoria; his work in the 1930s included buildings that were amongst the earliest influenced by the Modern movement, an influence continued in his 1950s houses, some based on pure geometric shapes. He was a member of the highly regarded partnership of Grounds, Romberg & Boyd from 1953 to 1963. His later work of the 1960s, such as the National Gallery of Victoria and the adjacent Victorian Arts Centre, cemented his legacy as a leader in Australian architecture.

Artist Marr Grounds was his son.

== Early life and education ==
Born on 18 December 1905 in St Kilda, a suburb of Melbourne, Grounds was educated at several schools, including Scotch College Melbourne and Melbourne Church of England Grammar School.

In the mid 1920s, he began his articles with the architectural firm of Blackett, Forster and Craig, where Geoffrey Mewton was doing the same. By 1928 they were both studying at the University of Melbourne Architectural Atelier, where they won first prize in an Institute of Architects Exhibition for a house costing under £1000, in a New England Colonial style. They both also won scholarships to further their studies later that year.

After graduating in 1928 they travelled to London together with another student, Oscar Bayne, where they all shared digs. After a brief time in London, Grounds worked in the United States for some time, including working in Los Angeles on set designs for the movies. It was there that he married American divorcee Virginia Lammers, née Marr, in August 1932, and it was there that his son, Marr Grounds was born in 1930.

== Career ==
On his return to Australia in 1932, Grounds shared an office with Mewton, who had already set up a solo practice the previous year, where they worked on projects separately, but published under "Mewton & Grounds". One of their first projects that is attributed to Grounds was radically modern for Melbourne – located in the hills of Upper Beaconsfield, Wildfell, built in 1933, was a long flat roofed rectilinear composition of white painted brick, with red and cream brick details and corner windows. This was followed in 1934 by the Milky Way Cafe in Little Collins Street, a venture of the United Milk Producers Society to encourage milk consumption, with modern tubular steel furniture and flush recessed lighting panels. While Mewton produced many designs in a Modernism combining the brick volumes of Willem Dudok with European Bauhaus starkness, Grounds also designed a number of houses influenced by the simple, rough modernism of US West Coast architect William Wurster. The most notable expression of this influence are a series of houses including Portland Lodge, Lyncroft, and the Ramsay House, all on the Mornington Peninsula, the Fairbairn House in Toorak and the house for the Chateau Tahbilk winery.

Grounds also designed in a more Streamline Moderne style, with his own family holiday house on the peninsula, nicknamed "The Ship" due to its long horizontal asbestos-cement sheet flat forms topped by a pipe railing and a glass walled lookout, and the similarly-styled Rosanove House in nearby Frankston.

In 1938, Grounds ended the partnership with Mewton when he went to England to be with Betty Ramsay, the wife of a client, both returning 1939.

Grounds had to restart his career, and in 1940–41 designed a series of unusually modern flat developments in the Toorak area. The unadorned Clendon, in Clendon Road Armadale, and the cream brick Moonbria in Mathoura Road, with its balustrades topped with Swedish blue tiles, were both 'minimum' studio flat developments, while Quamby and Clendon Corner were one bed flats. All shared similar, sometimes matching, tightly laid out kitchenttes and bathrooms, with fold down elements, simple but sturdy finishes, built-in cupboards and wardrobes, and in some cases furniture designed by Grounds was also used.

During World War II he served in the Royal Australian Air Force (1942—1945) as a Flight Lieutenant, performing works and camouflage duties. After the war, Grounds retired for a few years, returning in 1951 as a senior lecturer at the School of Architecture at Melbourne University. In 1953, he resumed his architectural practice and produced a series of houses, including his own, based on pure geometric shapes. The Leyser House was triangular, the Henty House was circular, and his own house was square, with a central circular courtyard. This theme was repeated in later projects, including the circular Round House in Hobart, and the square Master's Lodge at Ormond College.

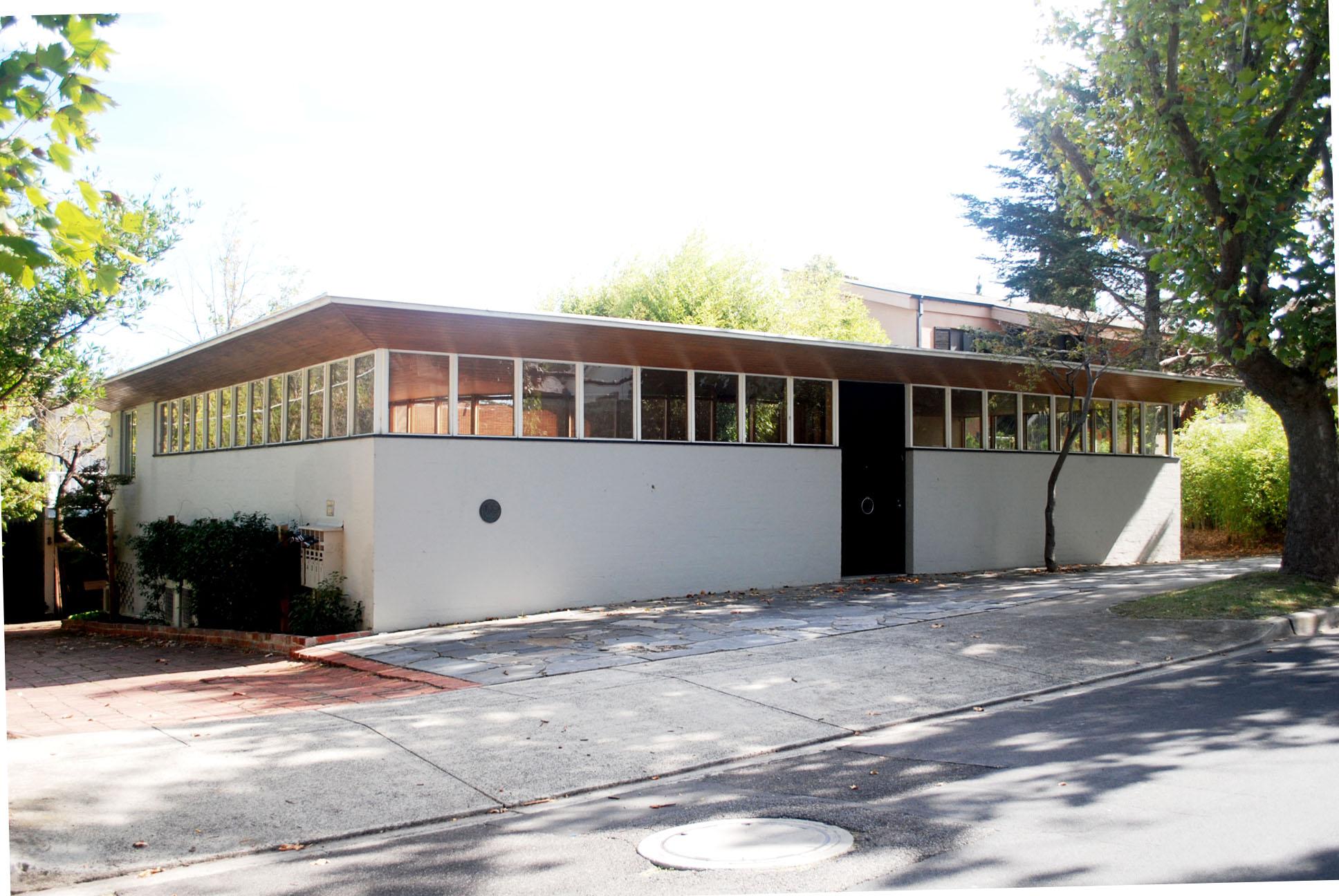
Roy Grounds House (House and Four Apartments), Toorak, Melbourne

When Grounds, Frederick Romberg and Robin Boyd formed their partnership in 1953 all were well established in Victoria. Each brought substantial work to the practice, which they usually worked on separately, and the firm became very successful.

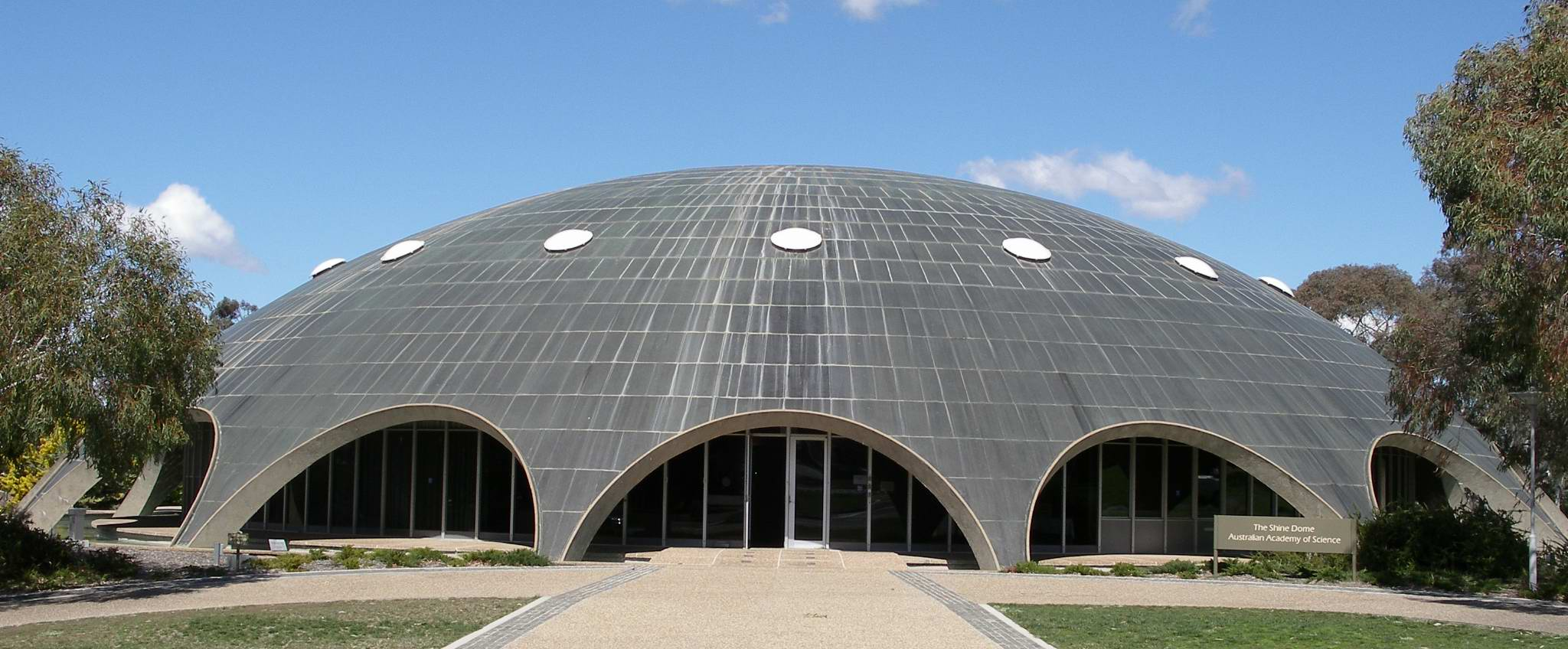
The Shine Dome of the Australian Academy of Science in Canberra

Grounds' first large commission was for the Australian Academy of Science in Canberra. The construction of its reinforced concrete dome was a considerable technical achievement. Opened in 1959, it won the Meritorious Architecture Award of the Canberra Area Committee of the Royal Australian Institute of Architects (RAIA) and the Sulman Award for Architectural Merit. The Academy building also led to other work in Canberra, initially for the firm and later Grounds himself. Grounds opened a Canberra office in the Forrest Townhouses (1959), which he designed and partly financed.

In 1959 the firm was awarded the commission to design the National Gallery of Victoria and Arts Centre, with Grounds named in the contract as the architect in charge. When Boyd and Romberg were mildly critical of the preliminary geometric designs that Grounds showed them, relations between the partners became strained, and in 1962 Grounds left the partnership, taking the commission with him and setting up his own company with Oscar Bayne.

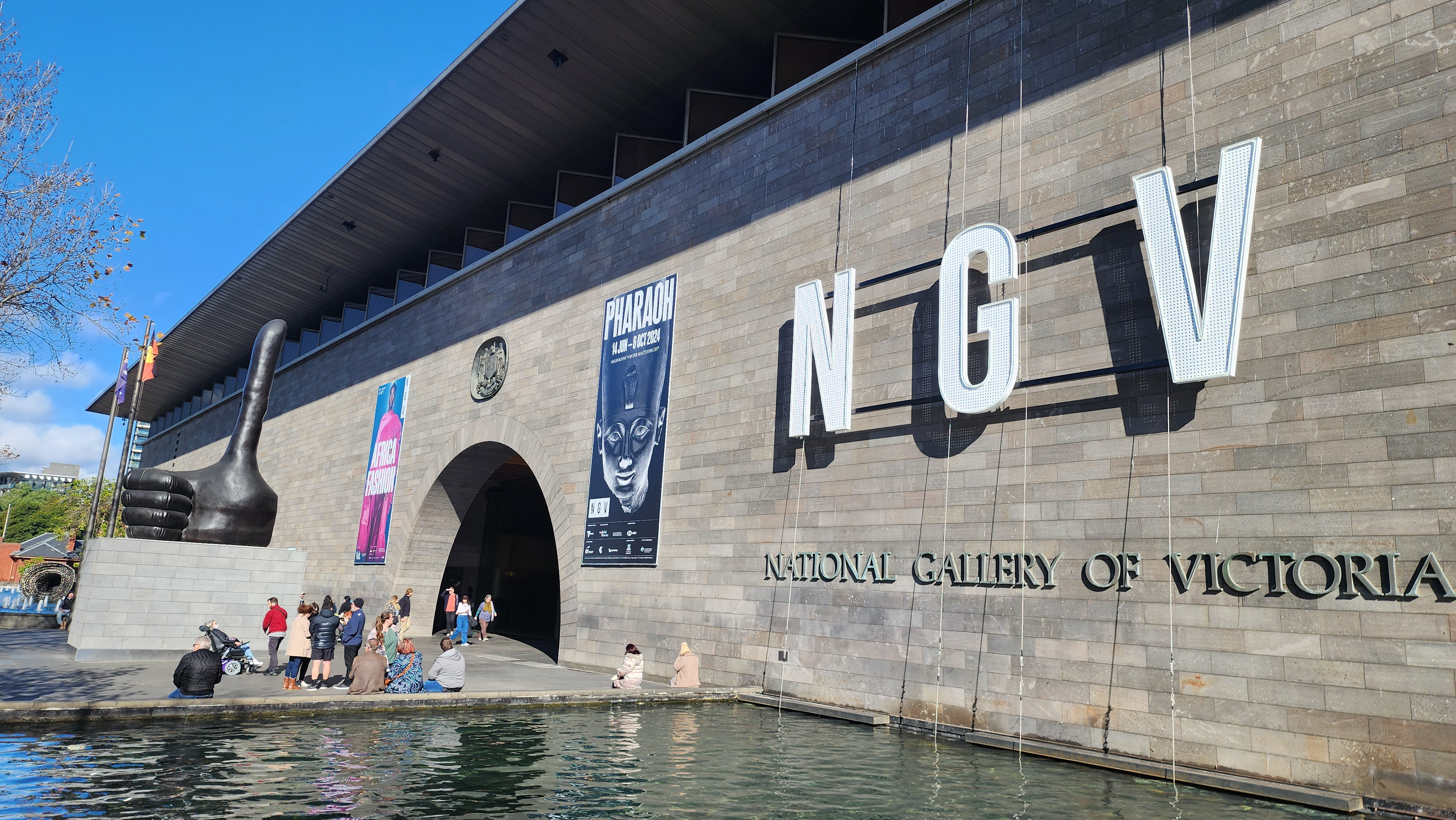
National Gallery of Victoria, Melbourne

Under a building committee chaired by the philanthropist Ken Myer, Grounds devoted the next twenty years of his life to the completion of the Arts Centre. His longest-serving architectural associates throughout this period were Alan Nelson, Fritz Suendermann, Lou Gerhardt and Allan Stillman. While the gallery was brought in on time and budget, the complicated Yarra River site for the Concert Hall and Theatre Complex resulted in building delays and criticism. Unlike the fate that befell Jørn Utzon on the Sydney Opera House project, Grounds managed to hold on to his commission from the Victorian Government despite tumult within his company in the late 1970s. Grounds showed Queen Elizabeth II the massive excavations shortly before his death. Much of the theatres' interior designs were completed by John Truscott after Grounds' death.

One of his last designs was Hobart's 18-story octagonal tower and Wrest Point Hotel Casino complex.

== Recognition and honours ==
- 1959: RAIA Meritorious Architecture Award
- 1959: Sir John Sulman Medal for Architectural Merit
- 1961: Canberra Medallion
- 1968: RAIA Gold Medal, Royal Australian Institute of Architects
- 1969: Knighted as a Knight Bachelor by Queen Elizabeth II
- 1969: elected a life fellow of the RAIA
- 1998: ACT 25 Year Award for Vasey Crescent Houses, Campbell
- 2001: ACT 25 Year Award for Australian Academy of Science
- 2018: ACT Award for Enduring Architecture renamed the Sir Roy Grounds Award for Enduring Architecture

== Death and legacy ==
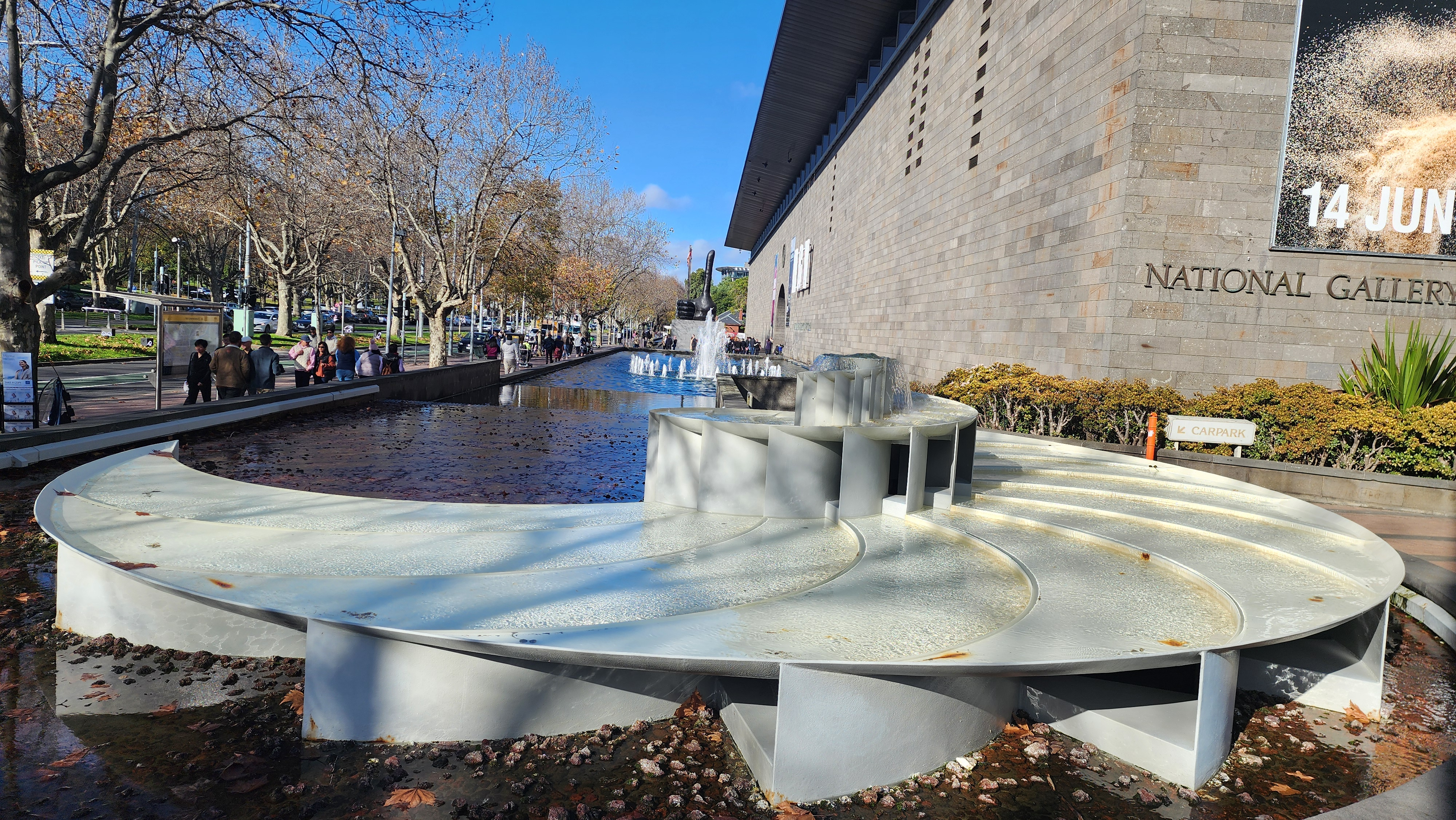
Nautilus fountain

Grounds died on 2 March 1981. In about 1984, a low steel spiral fountain known as the Nautilus was placed in the moat of the National Gallery Victoria as a memorial.

His early work included buildings influenced by the Moderne movement of the 1930s, and his later buildings of the 1950s and 1960s, such as the National Gallery of Victoria and the adjacent Victorian Arts Centre, cemented his legacy as a leader in Australian architecture.

In 2011, with the opening of the Museum of Old and New Art (MONA) in Hobart, Tasmania, two houses designed and built there by Grounds in 1957–1958 for Claudio Alcorso on the Moorilla Estate—the Courtyard House and the Round House—became respectively the entrance and the library of Australia's largest private museum.

== Family and personal life ==
While he was overseas in the early 1930s, Grounds married Regina Marr, an American divorcee (previous married name Lammers). Their son, artist Marr Grounds, was born in Los Angeles in 1930. They came to Australia in 1933, and lived in Frankston, but returned to the United States in 1939.

During 1938 Grounds created a scandal when he left his wife for a client, Alice Bettine (Betty) Ramsay, the wife of Tom Ramsay, (son of William Ramsay who founded Kiwi Boot Polish). Roy and Betty married in 1941 after time spent in London and each divorcing their partners. They had a daughter, Victoria, in 1947.

After 1953, the family lived in a remarkable house he designed in the affluent suburb of Toorak, known as the Roy Grounds House.

Marr Grounds married artist Joan Grounds, and died in New South Wales in 2021. Although he lectured in architecture at the University of Sydney from 1968, he never practised as an architect. He was known for his sculpture, and for co-founding the art workshop Tin Sheds at Sydney University with Donald Brook.

== Key works ==
Mewton & Grounds Attributed to both, and most likely Grounds:

- 'Portland Lodge', Henty House, 1 Plummer Avenue, Olivers Hill, Frankston (c. 1935) (Note: Henty House [1953], also designed by Grounds for the same client, was built adjacent to this dwelling.)
- Fairbairn House, 236 Kooyong Road, Toorak (1935–1936)
- Flats, 2-6 North Road, Brighton (1936) Altered.
- House, 493 Kooyong Road, Elsternwick (1936)

Attributed to Grounds:

- 'The Ship' (Grounds' family house), 35 Rannoch Avenue, Mount Eliza (1935)
- Rosanove House, 12 Gould Street, Frankston (c. 1935), demolished
- Lyncroft, 410 Tucks Road, Shoreham (1935)
- Chateau Tahbilk homestead, 254 O'Neils Road, Tahbilk (1935)
- Thomas House, 12 Reid Street, Balwyn, (c. 1935), demolished
- Ramsay House, 2 Rendelsham Avenue, Mount Eliza (1937)
- Second Milky Way Cafe, 175 Collins Street, Melbourne (1937)

Roy Grounds

- Clendon Flats, 13 Clendon Road, Armadale (1940)
  - Second stage, Clendon Corner, 16 Clemdon Road (1941)
- Moonbria Flats, 68 Mathoura Road, Toorak (1939—1941)
- Quamby Flats, 3 Glover Court, Toorak (1939—1941)
- Leyser House, Kew (1952), altered
- Roy Grounds House and flats, 24 Hill Street, Toorak (1953)
- Henty House (Round house, or Henty II), 581 Nepean Highway, Olivers Hill, Frankston South (1953)

Grounds Romberg & Boyd

- Currawong Ski Lodge, 13 Jack Adams Pathway, Thredbo, New South Wales (1957)
- Mirrabooka, 30-34 Moore Road, Vermont, Melbourne
- The Courtyard House (1957) and The Round House (1958), Moorilla Estate (both now part of The Museum of Old and New Art), 655 Main Rd, Berriedale, Hobart
- Masters Lodge, Ormond College, Melbourne University (1958)
- Vice Masters Lodge (alterations), Ormond College, Melbourne University (1958)
- Australian Academy of Science (Shine Dome), 15 Gordon Street, Acton, ACT (1959)
- Forrest Townhouses, 3 Tasmania Circle, Forrest, ACT (1959)
- Vasey Crescent Houses, 42, 44 and 46 Vasey Crescent, Campbell, ACT (1960)
- McNicoll House, 19 Gordon Grove, South Yarra, Victoria (1962—1963)

Roy Grounds & Co. Pty. Ltd.

- CSIRO Phytotron Building, Clunies Ross Street, Acton, ACT (1963)
- Botany Building (D.A. Brown Building), Australian National University, Acton Campus, Canberra, ACT (1968)
- National Gallery of Victoria, 200 St Kilda Road, Melbourne (1959—1968)
- National Gallery Art School and West Garden for outdoor sculptures, Nolan Street, Melbourne (1968—1969)
- Medley Building, University of Melbourne (1968—1971)
- Frankel House, 4 Cobby Street, Campbell, ACT (1969—1970)
- Robert Blackwood Hall, Monash University (1968—1971)
- Swan Hill Pioneer Settlement and Folk Museum expansion, Swan Hill (early 1970s)
- Nicholas families homes, 22 Hill Street, Toorak (c. 1970), much altered
- Wrest Point Hotel Casino, Hobart, Tasmania (1973)
- Arts Centre Melbourne, 100 St Kilda Road, Melbourne (1969—1984)

== Gallery of works ==
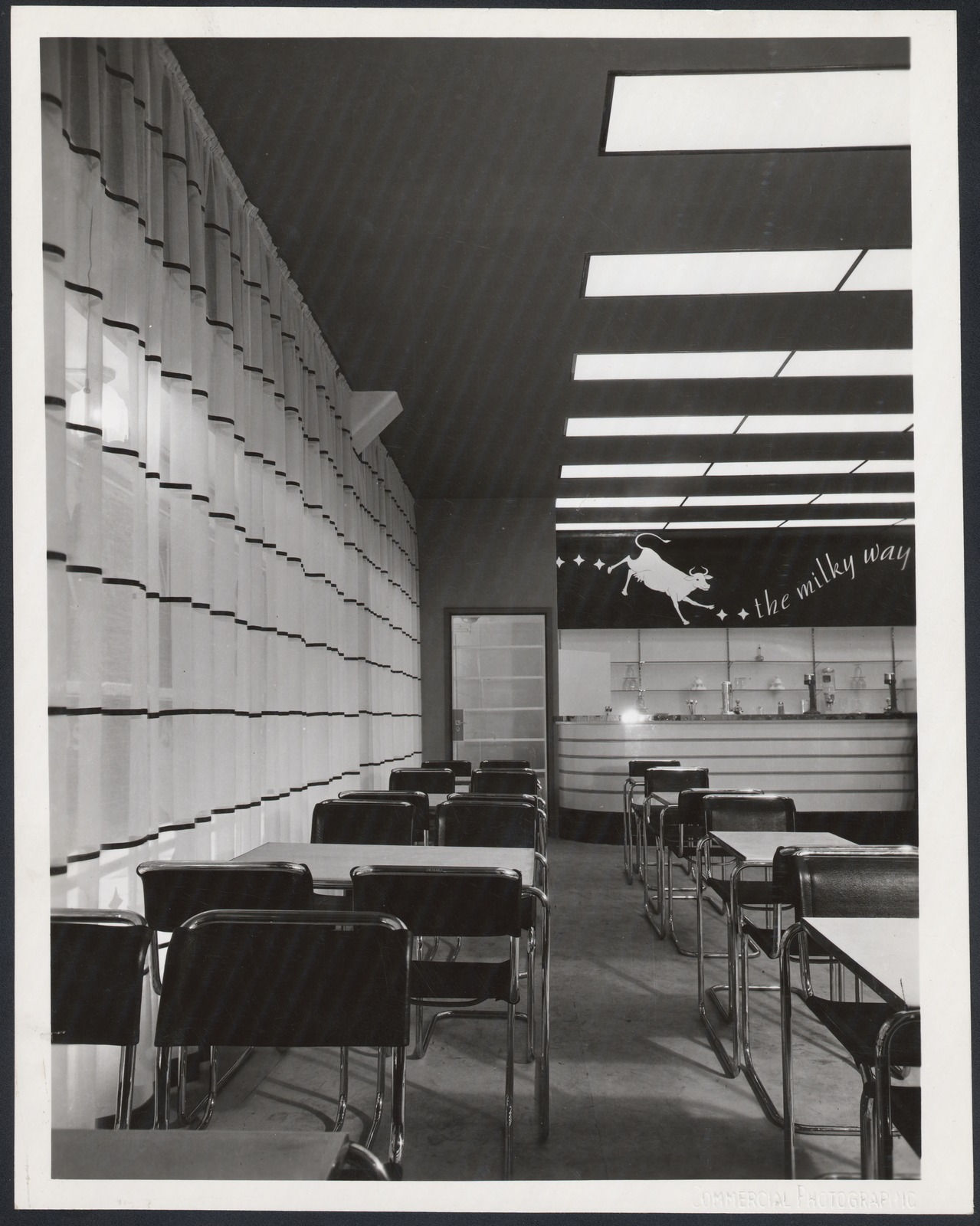
Milky Way cafe

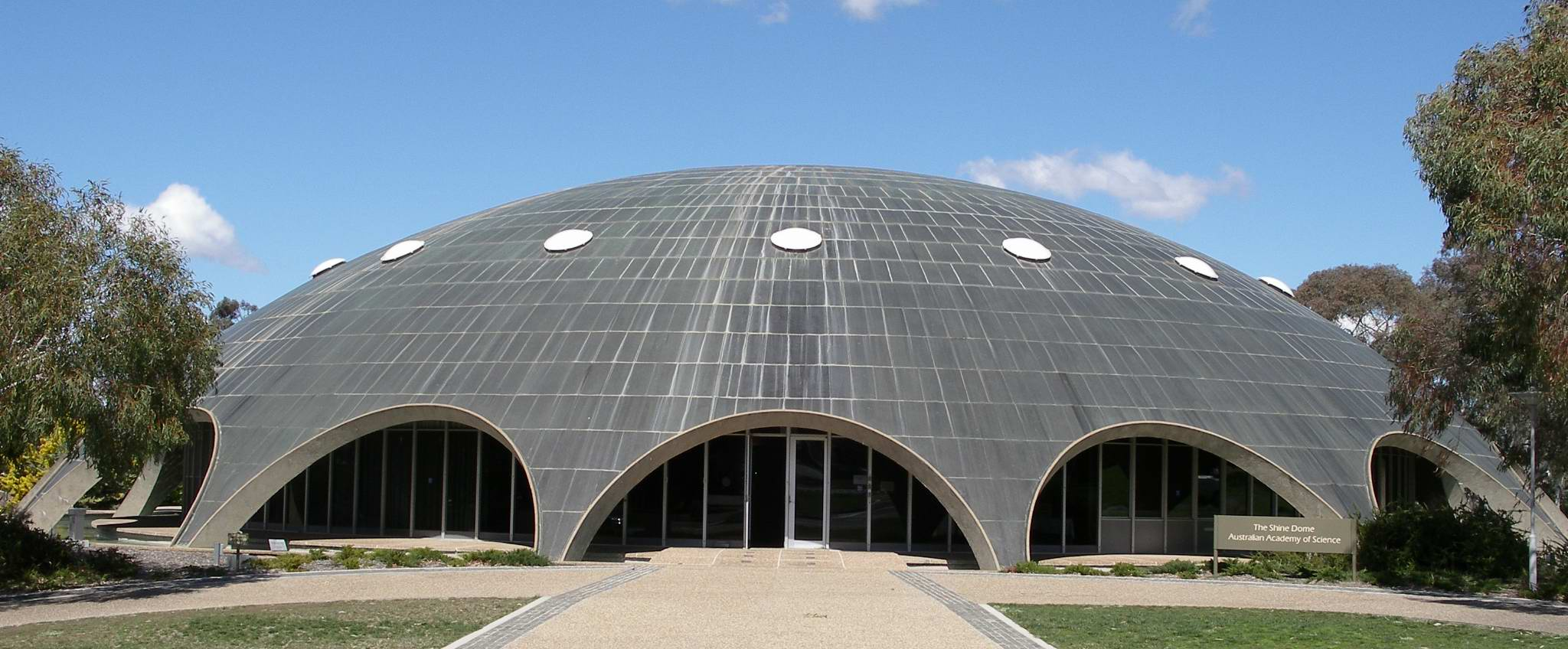
Shine Dome, Australian Academy of Science

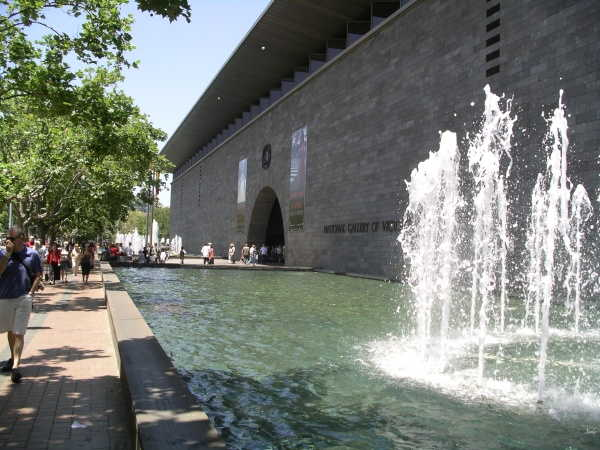
National Gallery of Victoria

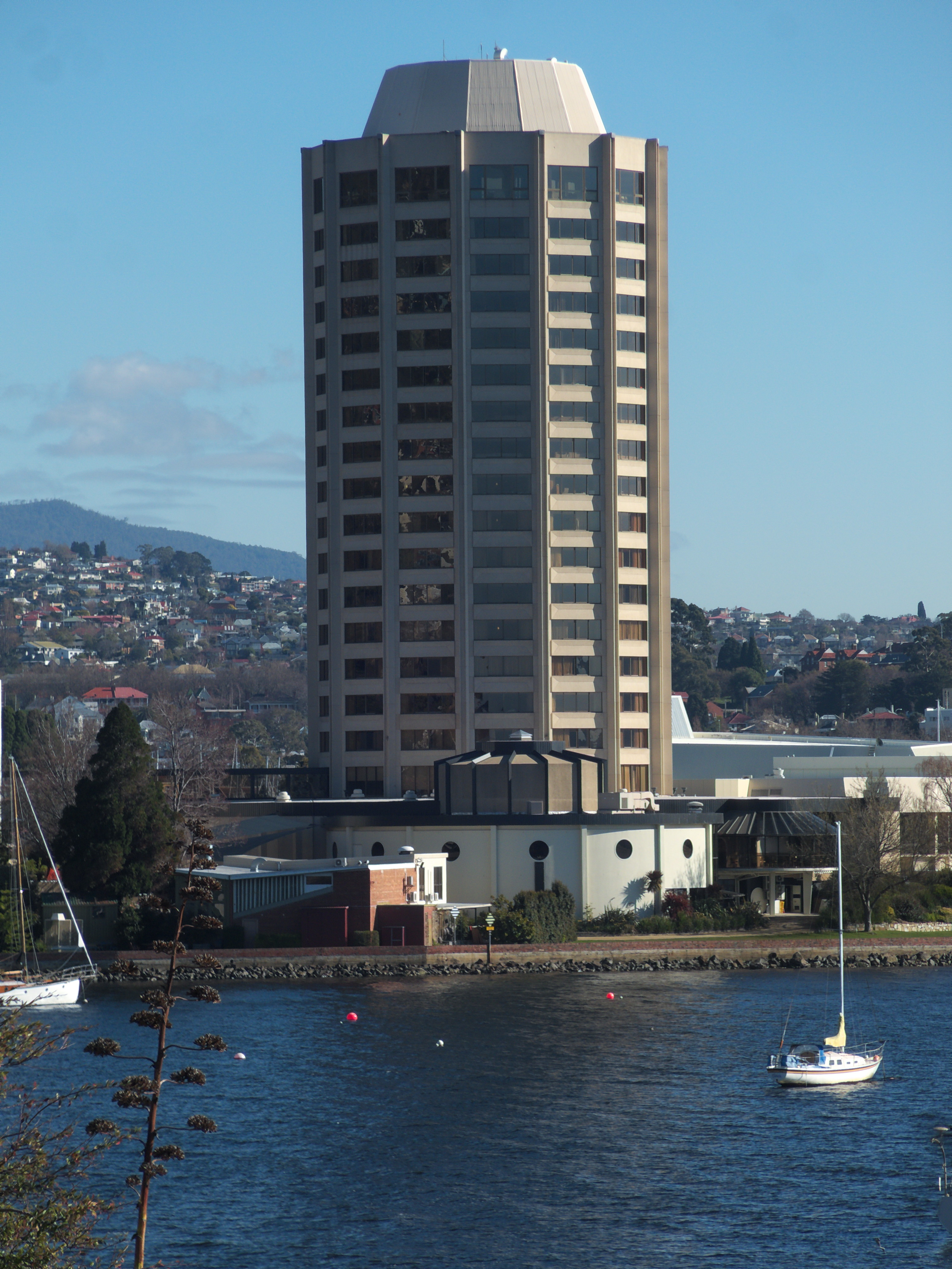
Wrest Point Hotel Casino, Hobart

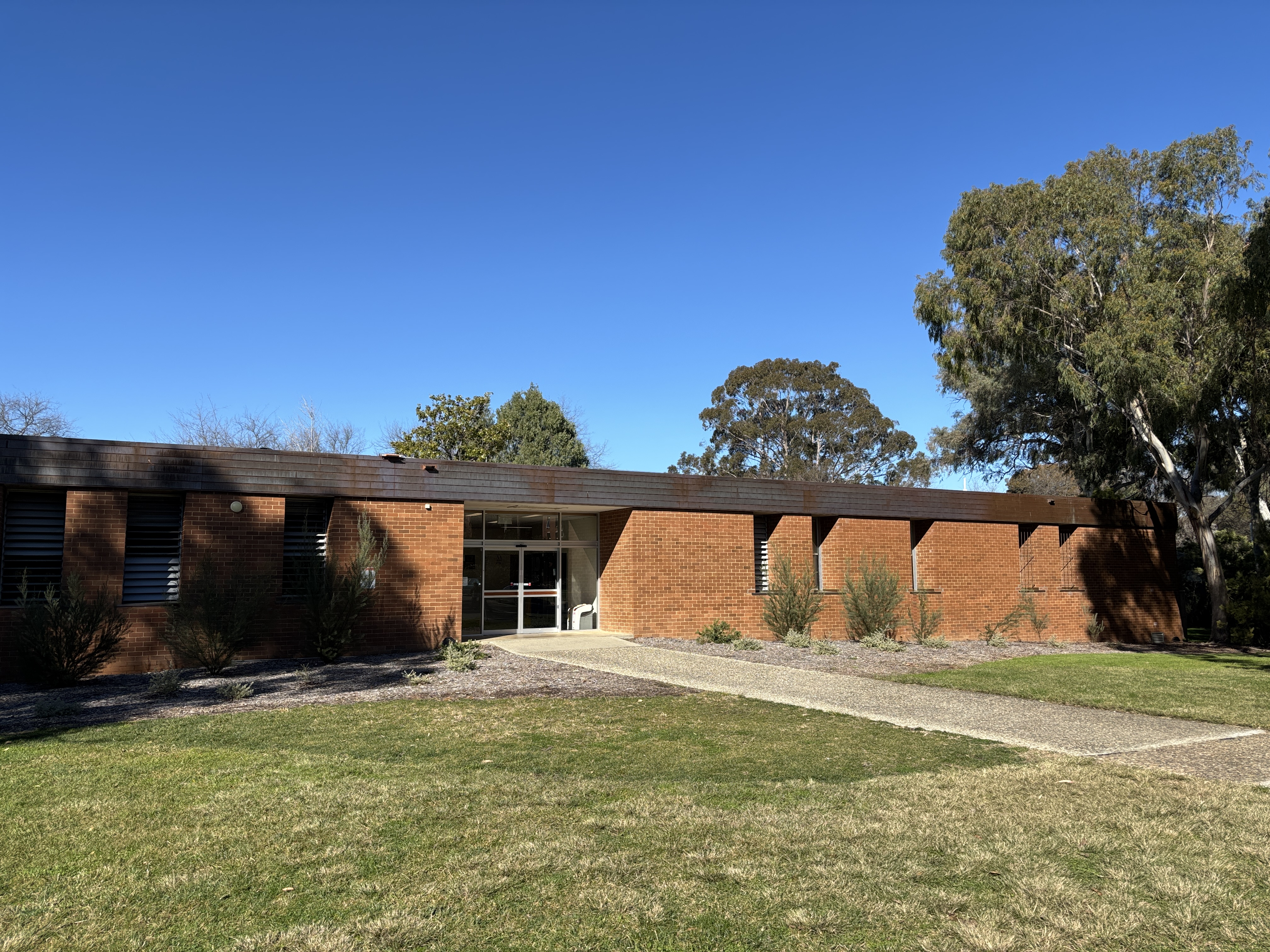
D.A. Brown Building, Australian National University

== See also ==
- Architecture of Australia
- List of buildings by Roy Grounds
- Modernist architecture

== Sources ==
- Goad, Philip James (1992), "The modern house in Melbourne, 1945-1975", PhD Thesis, Melbourne University.
- Jennifer Taylor, Australian Architecture Since 1960, RAIA, 1990
- Philip Goad, A Guide to Melbourne Architecture, Sydney, 1999
- Geoffrey Serle, Robin Boyd: A Life, Melbourne, 1995
- Eric Westbrook, Birth of a Gallery, Macmillan Australia, Melbourne, 1968
- Conrad Hamann, Grounds, Sir Roy Burman (1905–1981), Australian Dictionary of Biography
