= Ramsey House =

Ramsey House may refer to:

in the United States (by state then city)

- Harris–Ramsey–Norris House, Quitman, Georgia, listed on the NRHP in Brooks County, Georgia
- Lewis Ramsey Jr. House, Lexington, Kentucky, listed on the NRHP in Fayette County, Kentucky
- Ramsey House (Southville, Kentucky), listed on the NRHP in Shelby County, Kentucky]
- Ramsey County Poor Farm Barn, St. Paul, Minnesota, listed on the NRHP in Ramsey County, Minnesota
- Alexander Ramsey House, St. Paul, Minnesota, house of Minnesota governor Alexander Ramsey
- Justus Ramsey Stone House, St. Paul, Minnesota, listed on the NRHP in Ramsey County, Minnesota
- Ramsey County Sheriff's House, Devils Lake, North Dakota, listed on the NRHP in Ramsey County, North Dakota
- Ramsey House (Knox County, Tennessee), NRHP-listed, near Knoxville in Knox County, Tennessee
- Crouch–Ramsey Family Farm, Summitville, Tennessee, listed on the National Register of Historic Places in Coffee County, Tennessee
- F. T. and Belle Ramsey House, Austin, Texas, listed on the NRHP in Travis County, Texas
- Lewis A. Ramsey House, Salt Lake City, Utah, listed on the NRHP in Salt Lake City, Utah

in the United Kingdom

- Ramsey House (Durham University), a building of St Chad's College, Durham

== See also ==
- Ramsay House (disambiguation)
