= Roy Grounds House =

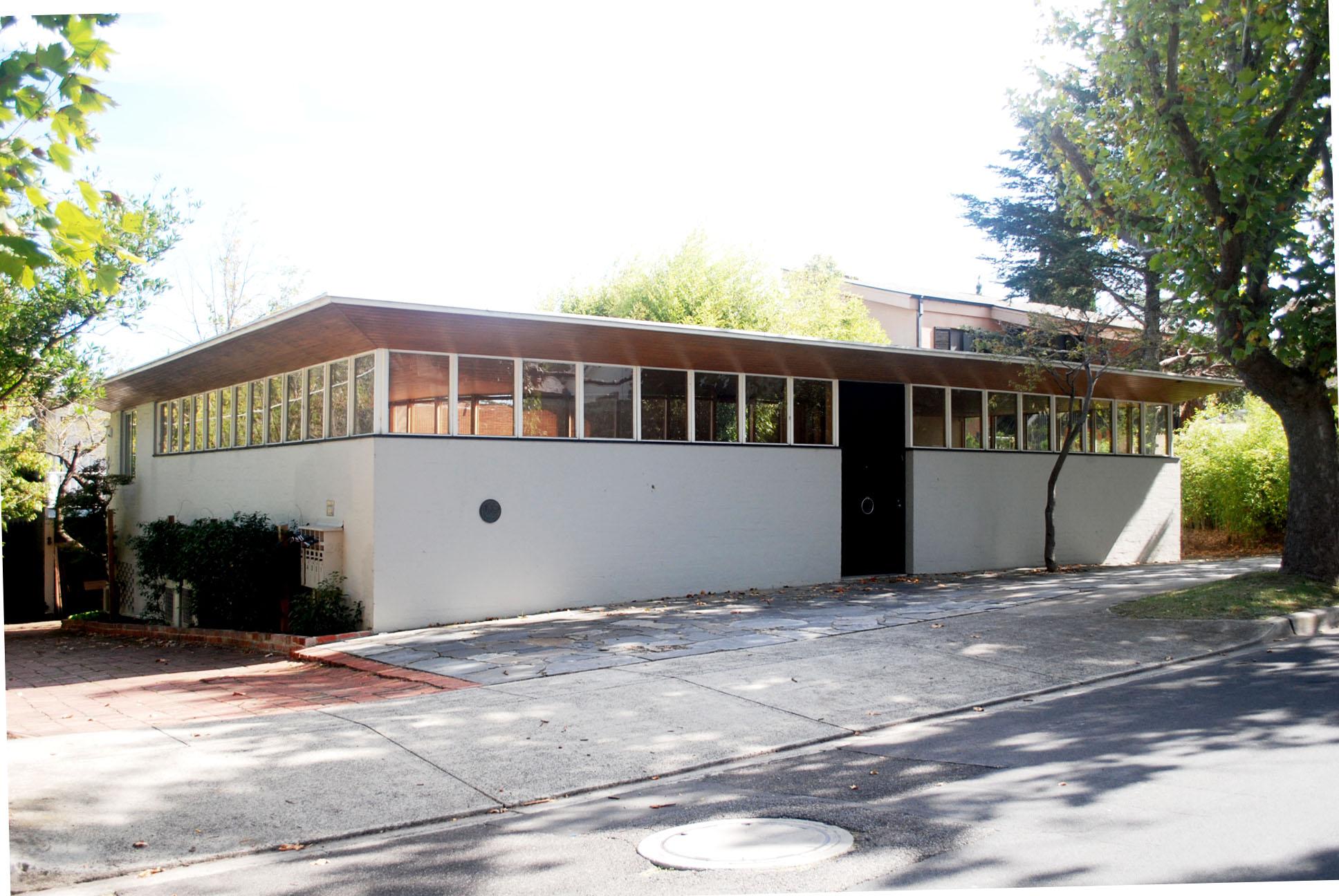
- View of building from Hill Street

General information
- Type: House & apartments
- Architectural style: Mid-Twentieth Century
- Location: 24 Hill Street, Toorak, Melbourne, Victoria, Australia
- Coordinates: 37.835435°S 145.013180°E
- Completed: 1953

Design and construction
- Architect: Sir Roy Grounds
- Architecture firm: Ground, Romberg and Boyd
- Awards: Victorian Architecture Medal 1954

Victorian Heritage Register
- Official name: Grounds House
- Type: Natural and cultural heritage register
- Designated: 21 December 2001
- Reference no.: H1963

The Roy Grounds House, at 24 Hill Street, Toorak in Melbourne, Australia, was designed by Sir Roy Grounds as his own home for his wife Betty and himself. It is celebrated as one of the most outstanding works of modernist domestic architecture of the mid 20th century in Victoria, a time of great experimentation, and one of the most notable designs by Roy Grounds, one of the most well known and influential modern architects in Victoria.

== Description ==
The house is an exercise in pure platonic geometries in plan, a perfectly circular glass walled courtyard within a square of solid brick walls, broken only by the front door (and a back door to the kitchen). A broad flat roof with wide eaves floats above the external wall on continuous highlight windows. Internally the rooms are divided by radial walls, which stop short of the courtyard, the focus of the house.

There are four flats behind the house that reach down the block, the first being a smaller single level studio unit, while the other three are matching larger double storey two bedroom units. These three step towards the driveway, allowing easy access to undercover parking, and increasingly larger courtyard gardens. While they do not have the geometry or oriental repose of the main house, they include distinctive features such as the angled carport walls, small slatted balconies, and a double height main space, with double storey window wall facing the courtyard gardens.

== Significance ==
The complete focus on the internal courtyard, creates an inward looking, almost eastern character. This oriental influence continues to the external design, with strong solid walls, topped by projecting eaves floating above the highlight windows, and a single central large door with oversized knocker. The original planting of the courtyard with persimmon and bamboo also displays an eastern influence.

The house is one of series by Roy Grounds built in the same year that explored pure geometric shapes; this house was square, the Henty House in Frankston was circular, while the Leyser House in Kew was an elevated triangle.

The Roy Grounds House is one of the most well known Mid Century Modernist houses in Melbourne. It received the only award granted in 1954, the Victorian Architecture Medal, which in turn was the only award granted between the awards ceasing in 1942 and restarting in 1964. In 1989 it was one of about 30 houses representing the range of Victorian house styles that were featured as models in the exhibition 'Home Sweet Home: Changes in Victorian Domestic Architecture, 1839-1989' staged by the Royal Australian Institute of Architects and the Museum of Victoria in 1989. In 2001 it was added to the Victorian Heritage Register. The house is considered a prototype for Grounds' design for the National Gallery of Victoria (NGV) in 1959, which also features a rectangular masonry volume, central door, highlight windows with a floating roof, and central courtyards. Since the mid-2000s the house has been rediscovered and elements restored, and is a widely known and celebrated, with owners passionate about its significance.

The Grounds house and flats is considered to be of architectural significance to the State of Victoria, with the Heritage Council Victoria describing it "... of architectural significance as one of the most celebrated works of modernist domestic architecture of the mid 20th century in Victoria. The perfectly square plan, with a circular courtyard at its centre, is a striking essay in pure geometry, a hallmark of Ground's work, and one of the best examples of experimentation with geometry in the work of post war avant-garde architects in Victoria."

== Gallery ==
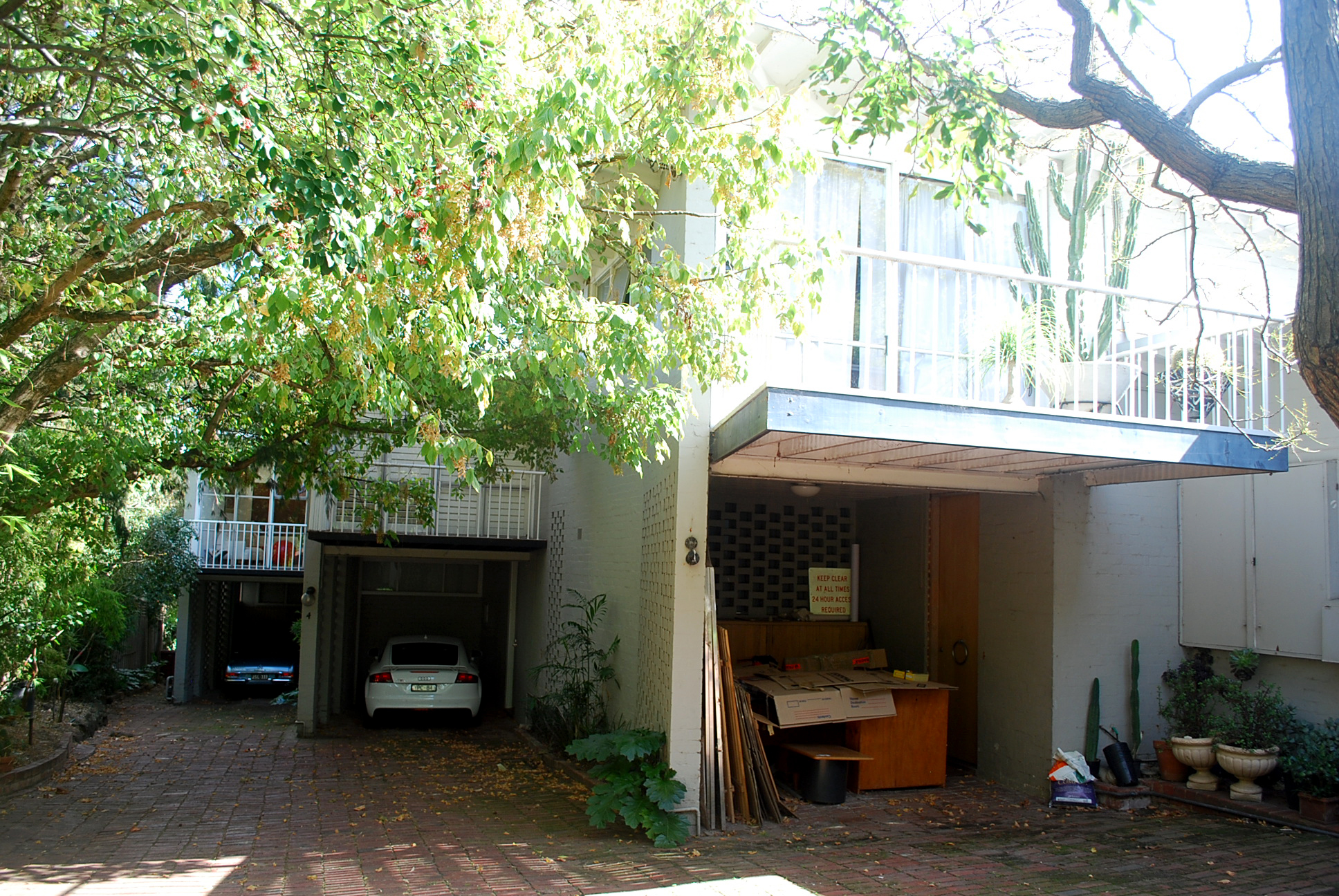
The flats to the rear

Plan

Elevation
