= Ramsey (given name) =

Ramsey is a given name, and may refer to:

- Ramsey Campbell (born 1946), British writer of horror fiction
- Ramsey Clark (1927–2021), American lawyer and political activist; 66th United States Attorney General
- Ramsey Dukes, pen name of writer and magician Lionel Snell
- Ramsey Kanaan, Scottish anarchist and political activist now residing in the United States; founder of AK Press
- Ramsey Lewis (1935-2022), American jazz musician and radio host
- Ramsey Wallace (1883-1933), silent film actor
