= Raley =

Raley is a surname and given name. Notable people with the surname include:

- Brooks Raley (born 1988), American Major League Baseball pitcher
- David Allen Raley (born before 1985), American murderer
- J. Frank Raley Jr. (1926–2012), American politician from Maryland
- John Wesley Raley (1903–68), American author and president of Oklahoma Baptist University
- Luke Raley (born 1994), American Major League Baseball outfielder
- William de Raley (before 1212 – 1250), English judge, administrator and bishop
- Raley Brien (also Johnston McCulley / American author)

== See also ==
- Raley, Alberta, an unincorporated community in Cardston County, Canada
- Raley's Supermarkets, an American supermarket chain
- Raley Field, a California stadium and home of the Sacramento River Cats minor league baseball team
- Rhali Dobson (Australian soccer player)
- Raly Tejada (Filipino diplomat and lawyer)
