= Saxil Tuxen =

Saxil Tuxen (1885–1975) was an influential surveyor and town planner in Melbourne, Australia, during the interwar period. Tuxen was born in Kew, Victoria, on 11 December 1885.

== Surveying and town planning career ==
Tuxen worked for his Danish-born father's surveying firm in Melbourne, during the first decade of the twentieth century. After the death of his father in 1913, Saxil took over the surveying practice. The firm had forty years experience in the sub division of suburban land throughout Melbourne. Tuxen drew on this experience and developed an awareness of the intrinsic relationship between surveying and town planning.

Tuxen "enjoyed success with conventional forms of design but he was also open to persuasion" and new ideas. His differing approaches to design and planning are evident in his 1914 "right-angled subdivision design in Bittern, Victoria". The Bittern design was based on a grid system plan. In contrast, his design for the 'Hill Top' development in Mont Albert, a suburb of Melbourne, incorporated "unusual size and shape, with an irregular streetscape". This example demonstrated Tuxen's movement away from the grid system, to the contemporary design approach of the early twentieth century. This new design embraced curved, radial and diagonal streets; the environment was celebrated through open spaces and parks, and civic buildings were placed in the centre of town.

By the 1920s, Tuxen was as one of Australia's leading town planning experts. A plethora of planning knowledge and experience enabled Tuxen to become a founding member of the Victorian Town Planning Association.

In 1923 Tuxen collaborated with the office of Walter Burley Griffin to design the Ranelagh Estate, on Victoria's Mornington Peninsula. The estate had "distinctive long curved roads, recreation reserves, internal reserves, and spacious triangular traffic islands, which were designed to harmonise with the topography of the land". In 1925 Tuxen designed Park Orchards, in Melbourne.

Between 1923 and 1929, Tuxen worked in a voluntary capacity for Melbourne's Metropolitan Town Planning Commission (MTPC) as a technical expert. His primary interests were Melbourne's waterways, roadways and public transport. Tuxen's primary focus was to ensure that Melbourne's tram networks were preserved and maintained, at a time when other planning experts were calling for them to be removed and to promote development which incorporated Melbourne's waterways, notable, the Yarra River.

In 1925, during his association with the MTPC, Tuxen travelled to the US to gain further knowledge of contemporary technology and practice. He "photographed important urban features for potential incorporation into the future Melbourne [plan], paying particular attention to open spaces, streetscapes and building heights".

By 1932, Tuxen "had designed or co-designed at least thirty suburban divisions – a majority of which could be termed garden suburbs". He is often overshadowed by better known contemporaries like John Sulman and architect/planner Walter Burley Griffin. However, Tuxen is the "most successful [garden city planner], where success is defined in terms of projects actually reaching completion in a form close to the original design".

== Ideas and influences ==
Tuxen was exposed to a variety of surveying and town planning theory and design through his international travels. He "was in touch with international developments, and utilised them where appropriate in his work". Tuxen firmly believed that surveyors and town planners needed to work together if suburban subdivisions were to be successful. He felt that the values and expertise of the surveying profession facilitated Melbourne's plan, which incorporated a unique layout and an abundance of parklands. Tuxen's interest in the civic improvement of society and his passion for "planning" as a profession resulted in the widespread advancement of town planning throughout Australia.

He has been described as a "socially conscious [and] politically active planner [who had] interests in the built environment and social policy".

== Legacy ==
The inaugural Saxil Tuxen championship, an ambrose golf tournament named in honour of Tuxen, has been played annually by residents of Park Orchards since January 2024.

| Year | Course | Winning team | Score | Tees | Notes |
|---|---|---|---|---|---|
| 2024 | Garninders Run | Dirlton | 64 (-8) | White | Putt-off following a tie |
| 2025 | Garninders Run | Dirlton | 68 (-4) | White | Putt off following a tie |
| 2026 | Garninders Run | Dirlton | 65 (-7) | Blue | 2nd place: Domeny 69 (-3); 3rd place: Iona (+3) |

The house located at 520 Park Road, Park Orchards is named after Tuxen.
