= Geoffrey Harley Mewton =

Australian architect (1905–1998)

- Born: 21 January 1905; Brighton, Victoria, Australia
- Died: March 1998; Fulham, London, England
- Education: Melbourne University
- Occupation: Architect
- Known for: Woy Woy Flats
- Spouse: Elma Ellen Mewton
- Parent(s): William Arthur Mewton; Violet Ratcliff Ford

Geoffrey Harley Mewton (1905–1998) was an Australian architect and leading proponent of modern architecture in Melbourne during the 1930s. He is best known for the Woy Woy flats at Elwood, Victoria, amongst the first flat blocks in Melbourne to show the influence of the European Modern movement.

== Personal life ==
Geoffrey Mewton was the youngest child of William Arthur Mewton and Violet May Ratcliff Ford (1868–1953). His siblings were Beryl Harley Mewton (1898–1982) and Roydon Harley Mewton (1900–1964). Born on 21 January 1905 in Brighton, Melbourne, he was educated at Wesley College, Melbourne. In 1938 he married Elma Ellen Gotz, and they lived in Sandringham in a house he designed for the next 20 years. They had one child, Noelle Margret Mewton. In March 1998, Mewton died while on a trip to London, England aged 93.

== Architectural career ==
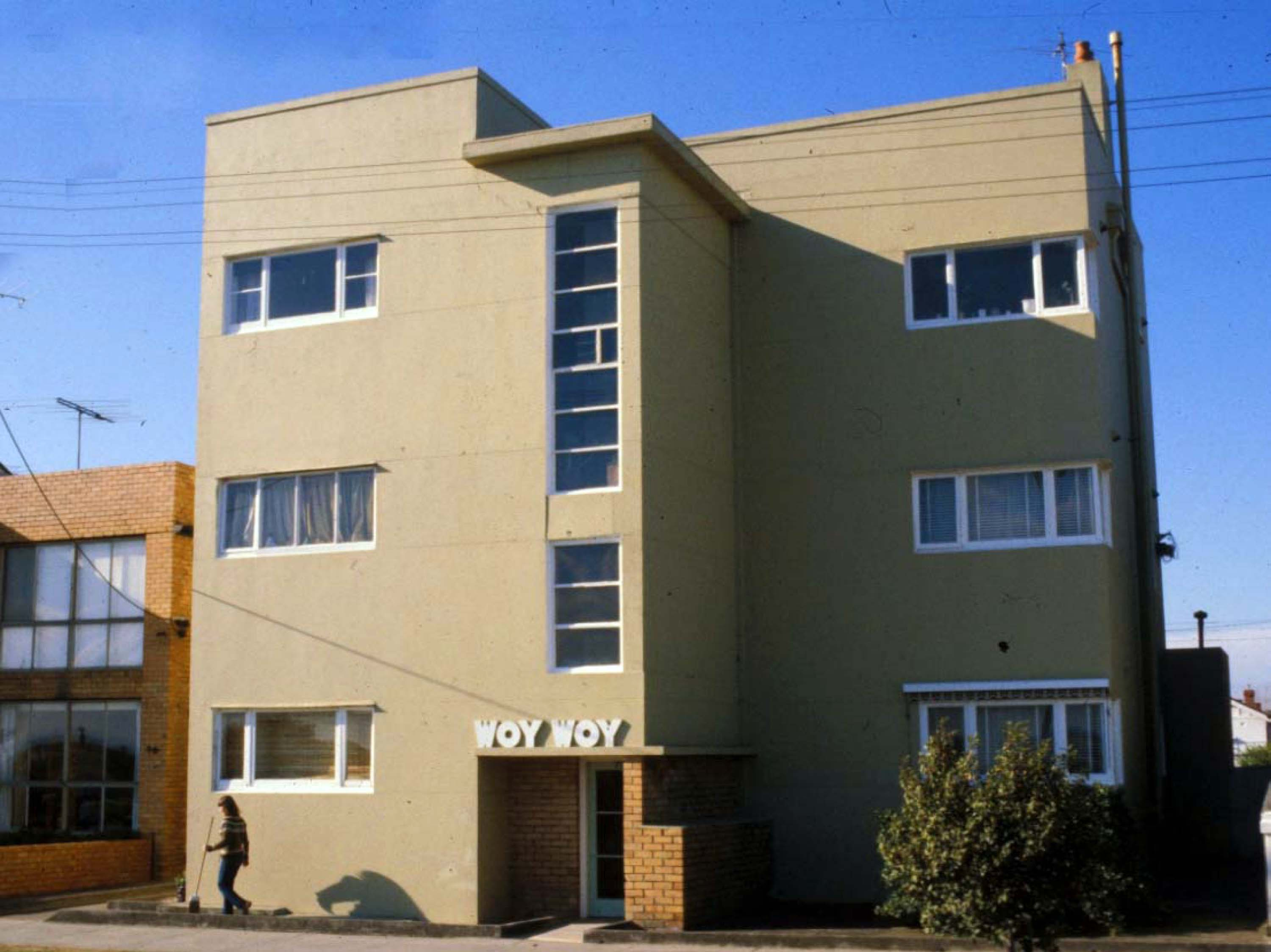
Woy Woy, Elwood, 1982 (before alterations)

Mewton began his architectural career in 1923, beginning his articles at the Blackett, Foster & Craig office while studying at night at the Working Men's College (now the Royal Melbourne Institute of Technology, RMIT). From 1926 to 1928 Mewton attended night classes at the Melbourne University Architectural Atelier. While still a student in May 1928, Mewton, in partnership with fellow student Roy Grounds, won 1st prize in a Royal Victorian Institute of Architects Exhibition for a house costing under £1000. He also won a scholarship later that year. After graduating, in mid 1928 Mewton and Grounds set off together on a 'world's tour', first to London with another student Oscar Bayne, where they all shared 'digs'.

During his time in London, Mewton worked for Adams Holden & Pearson (partner Charles Holden is best known for his Modernist 1930s London Underground railway stations).

In 1929 after travelling to New York with Grounds, Mewton found work in the office of William Van Alen, at the time completing the Chrysler Building, briefly the world's tallest building.

At the age of 25 on 20 October 1930 Mewton returned to London to sit his Royal Institute of British Architects (RIBA) examinations and then travelled throughout Europe for nearly two years, where he is known to have seen the work of Dutch architect Willem Dudok, as well as modern houses in Germany, which he later wrote about.

On returning home to Melbourne, Australia on 13 September 1932, Mewton set up his own office. A few months later Roy Grounds returned to Melbourne and the pair formed the office Mewton & Grounds in January 1933. Their partnership was informal and each worked individually, collecting their own profits. Quickly the pair became acknowledged as amongst the chief protagonists of modernism in Melbourne.

Out of the many projects designed under this arrangement, only some have been definitely ascribed to one or the other, but it is thought that Mewton's work in this period was often the more starkly Modernist of the two, exhibiting the influence of the work of Dutch Architect William Dudok, combined with the minimalism of the Bauhaus, in a series of blocky brick or rendered houses and flats over the next 5 years. However both partners appear to have designed in both Modernist mode and in a more cottage style. One of their first projects was radically modern for Melbourne - Wildfell, built in 1933, located in the hills of Upper Beaconsfield, was a long flat roofed rectilinear composition of white painted brick, with red and cream brick details and window frames painted 'burnt autumn', clearly influenced by Dudok. This was followed in 1934 by the Milky Way Cafe in Little Collins Street, a venture of the United Milk Producers Society to encourage milk consumption, with modern tubular steel furniture and flush recessed lighting panels, and both projects may have been Mewton's.

Projects similar in approach to Wildfell include the yellow brick Ingpen House, Geelong (1934, demolished), the very similar Evan Price House, Essendon (1935), the white-brick Stooke House Brighton (1935, demolished), and the blocky two-tone brick of the Bellaire Flats in St Kilda (1936), the last two known to be Mewton. The flat roofed rendered boxy walls of Mewton's Woy Woy flats, Elwood, 1936 (and the similar Watt House, Toorak), are clearly influenced by the pure 'white box' Modernism of late 1920s Germany, and it is probably the first apartment building in Australia to do so. Some of the other designs by the partnership were rustic gable roofed designs inspired by the work of William Wurster, most of which it is accepted were by Roy Grounds' but Mewton's own house in Sandringham (1938), after the partnership ended, followed this mode as well, executed in red brick as a series of overlapping gable roofed sections, employing windows at the rear that could be folded back completely to create a house that opened to the garden. Robin Boyd described this house as "the perfect example of the Victorian type, house and garden are really planned as one."

Other designs show how even interwar architects known for their Modernist work could also design in more traditional styles. One of Mewton & Grounds' first projects was a block of flats in Ormond Road Elwood (1933), which are modern yet domestic in character, with overall simplicity in cream brick, but also prominent gables and chimneys, and stylised Georgian detailing in raised brickwork.

In about 1937 Grounds left for another overseas trip, leaving Mewton to practice alone, though the partnership was not formally dissolved until 1939, when Mewton began a partnership with Edward Billson that lasted to 1942. In this period, Mewton's designs were more traditional, yet modern, such as the maisonettes in St Georges Court, Toorak (1939), with modernist white rendered walls and porthole windows, combined with simple gable roofs, a prominent chimney and Georgian touches - an arched entry to one unit and a concave porch roof over the other - while the Riviera Court flats in Brighton (1938) apply the same simple gable roofed shapes, but with the brick detailing seen in the 1933 Elwood flats.

During World War II, Mewton worked for the Department of Labour and National Service, working on mess halls and field hospitals.

After the war, Mewton worked briefly in 1945 for the firm A.C. Leith & Bartlett, producing a booklet of designs for the Housing Commission of Victoria. He was nominated that same year as judge for the Sun Post War Homes competition, and was an advocate for The Age 'Small Homes Service', established in 1947.

Later in 1945 Mewton joined the firm Godfrey & Spowers, along with Eric Hughes and John Lobb, together forming 'Godfrey, Spowers, Hughes, Mewton and Lobb'. An early notable project was the Babel Building at Melbourne University in 1947. Expanding in the 1950s, the firm began to undertake industrial and office buildings such as Allan's Music Building, Collins St (1956), National Mutual Centre Melbourne (1965, demolished) and Dallas Brooks Hall (1963–1969, demolished). Mewton continued to work for Godfrey, Spowers, Hughes, Mewton and Lobb as a partner until he retired from practice in 1980.

== Key works ==
- The (demolished) George Stooke House, 72 Halifax Street, Brighton, was built 1935, and won equal first prize of three in the Royal Victorian Institute of Architects Architectural Competition, as part of the Ideal Home Exhibition held in February 1936. The modest house, composed of low interlocking and rectilinear volumes including a walled garden was built of strikingly modern white bricks.
- Woy Woy, 77 Marine Parade, Elwood, was built in 1936, and is the earliest example of Modernism in flat development in Melbourne, along with Cairo Flats in Fitzroy of the same year, and both are amongst the few of any pre-WW2 apartment developments in the city to display this influence. The design is extremely minimal, with the cubic forms perhaps deriving from Willem Dudok, though the severe flat rendered walls are closer to the German Bauhaus. In the early 1980s the appearance was changed substantially - the roof over the stairs was raised from well below the parapet to be in line with the roof, with a '1936' plaque, a window, and the rooftop glazed pavilion added, and all the windows of the two upper floors were enlarged by lowering the sills (a photo can be found here).
- Mewton's own house at 207 Bluff Road, Sandringham, built in 1938, is a single-storey clinker brick house with a terracotta tiled gabled roof. With a long row of folding windows to the rear garden, Robin Boyd described it "as a wise house that knows not to be jealous of the garden." in his seminal 1947 publication Victorian Modern, placing it amongst the houses that he felt introduced Modernism to Victoria.

== List of works ==
Mewton & Grounds

Attributed to Mewton

- George Stooke House, 72 Halifax Street, Brighton VIC (1935, demolished 1988)
- Woy Woy flats, 11 Marine Parade, Elwood VIC (1936)
- Bellaire Flats, 3 Cowderoy Street, St Kilda VIC (1936)

Attributed to Mewton (probable):

- Wildfell, Upper Beaconsfield VIC (1933, demolished)
- Ingpen House, Aphrasia Street, Geelong VIC (1934, demolished)
- Milky Way Cafe, 300 Little Collins Street, VIC (1934, demolished)
- Concrete House, Centenary Homes competition (1934, no prize)
- Evan Price House, Essendon, VIC (1935)
- Watt House, Toorak VIC (1936, altered)
- Scout Settlement Home, 313 Nott Street, Port Melbourne VIC (1936)

Attributed to both :

- Flats, 46 Ormond Road, Elwood VIC (1933)
- 'Portland Lodge', Henty House, 1 Plummer Avenue Olivers Hill, Frankston VIC (1934) (this is adjacent to Grounds' 1953 Henty House)
- Fairbairn House, 236 Kooyong Road, Toorak VIC (1935–36)
- Flats, 2-6 North Road, Brighton VIC (1936, altered).
- House, 493 Kooyong Road, Elsternwick VIC (1936)

Geoffrey Mewton

- Riviera Court Flats, 156 Church Street, Brighton VIC (1938)
- Mewton House, 207 Bluff Road, Sandringham VIC (1938)

Billson & Mewton

- Maisonettes, 11 St Georges Court, Toorak VIC (1939)
- House, Findon Ave Caulfield VIC (1939)
- Ryan House, Yarradale Road, Toorak VIC (c1940, demolished)
- Griffith House, 1 Lisbouy Court, Toorak VIC (c1940)

Geoffrey Mewton

- House, 21 Summerhill Road, Beaumaris VIC (1950, demolished)

== Gallery ==
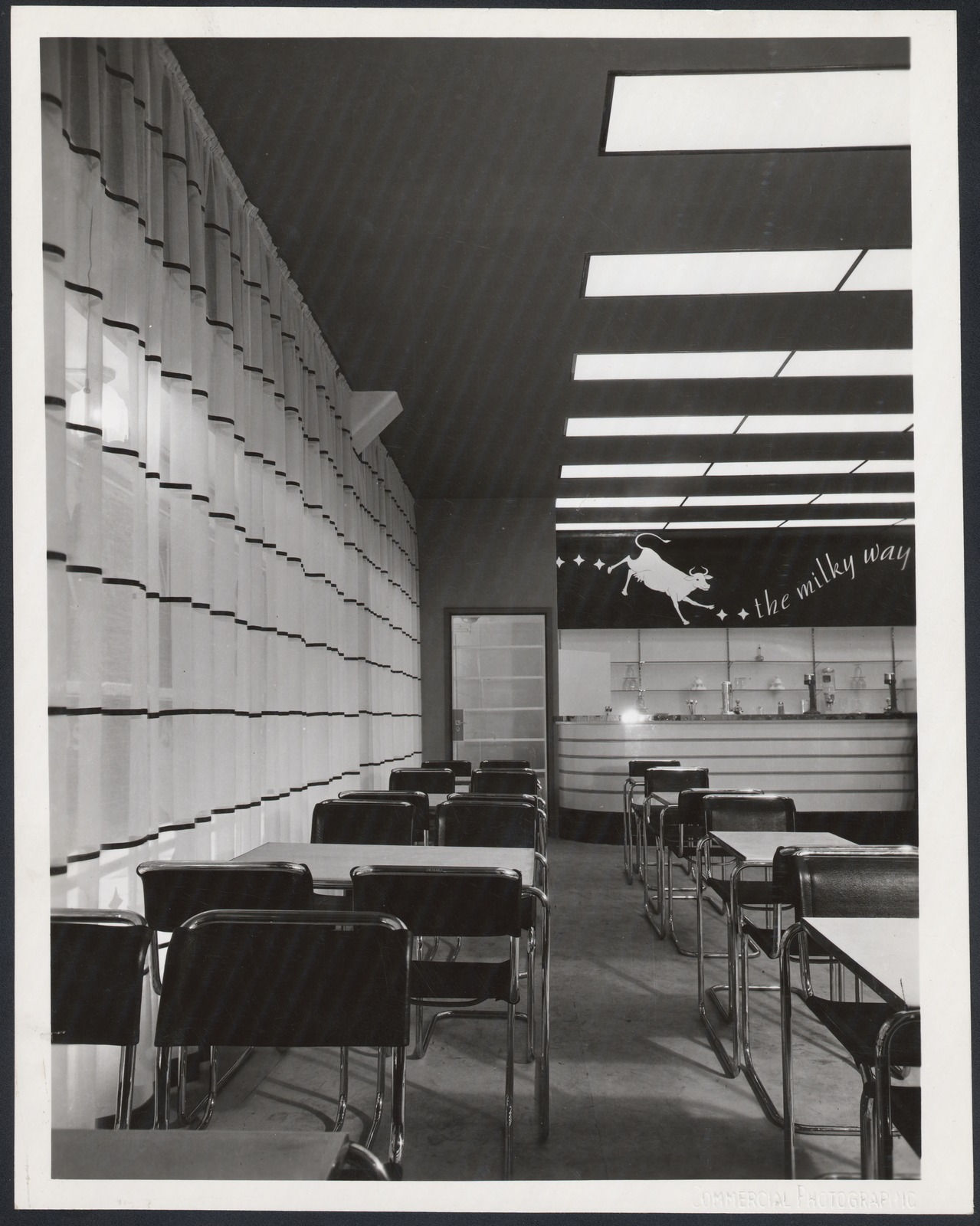
Milky Way cafe, 1934 (demolished)

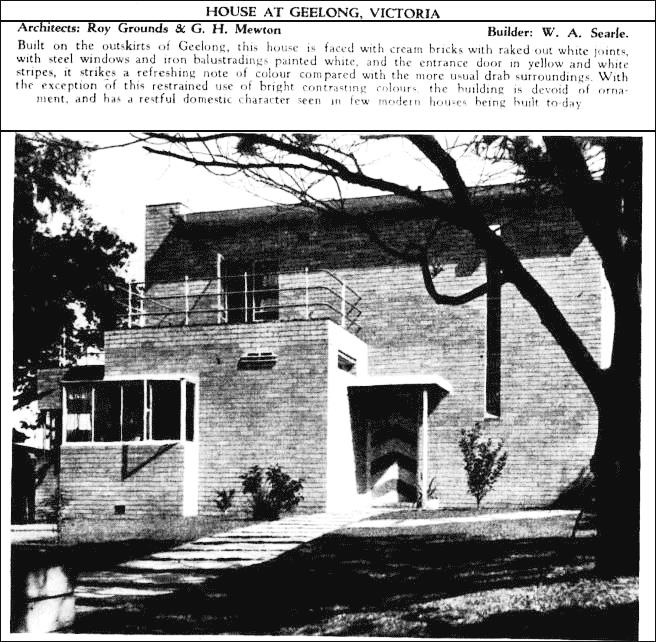
Ingpen House, Aphrasia Street, Geelong, 1934 (demolished)

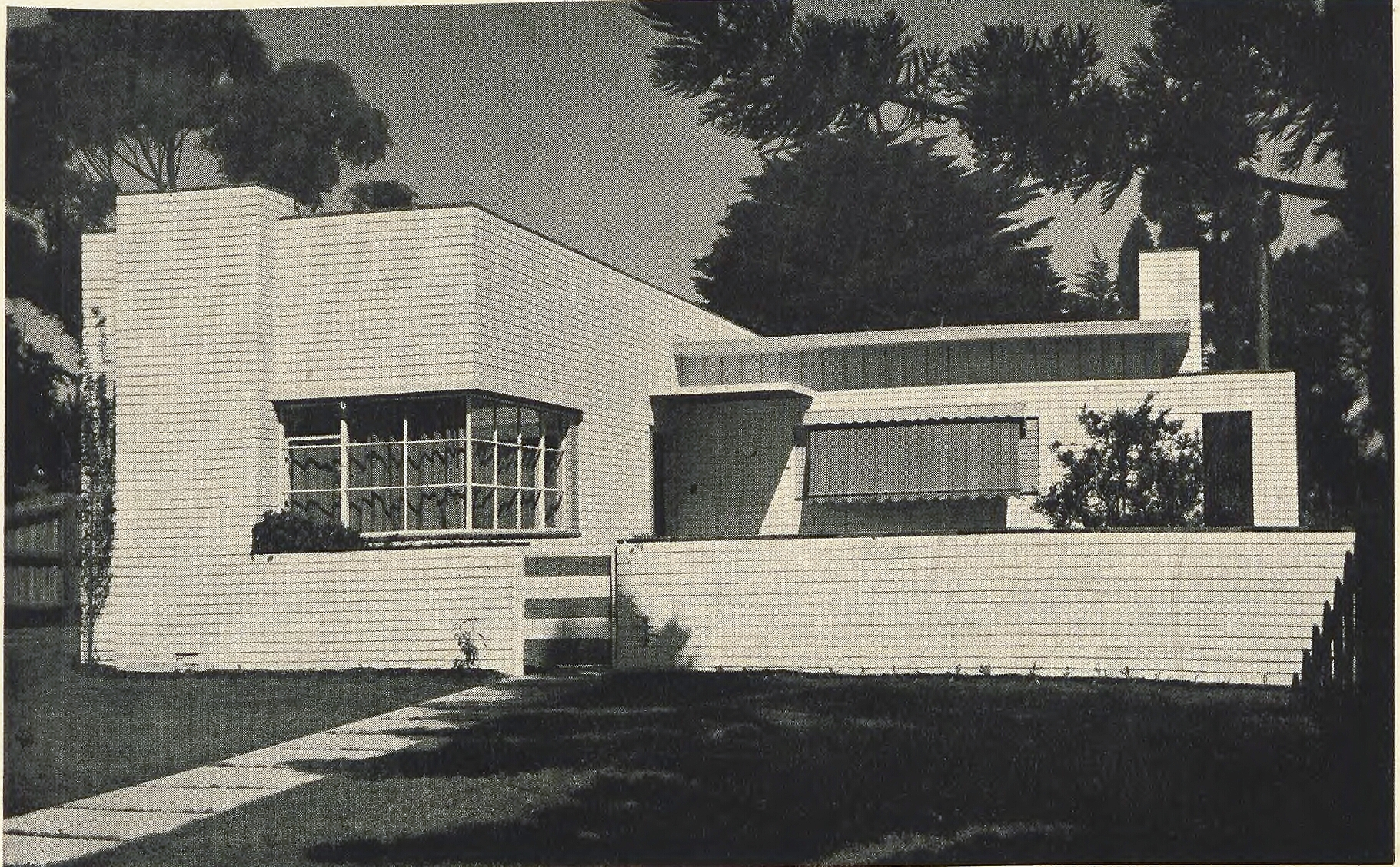
Stooke House, 1935 (demolished)

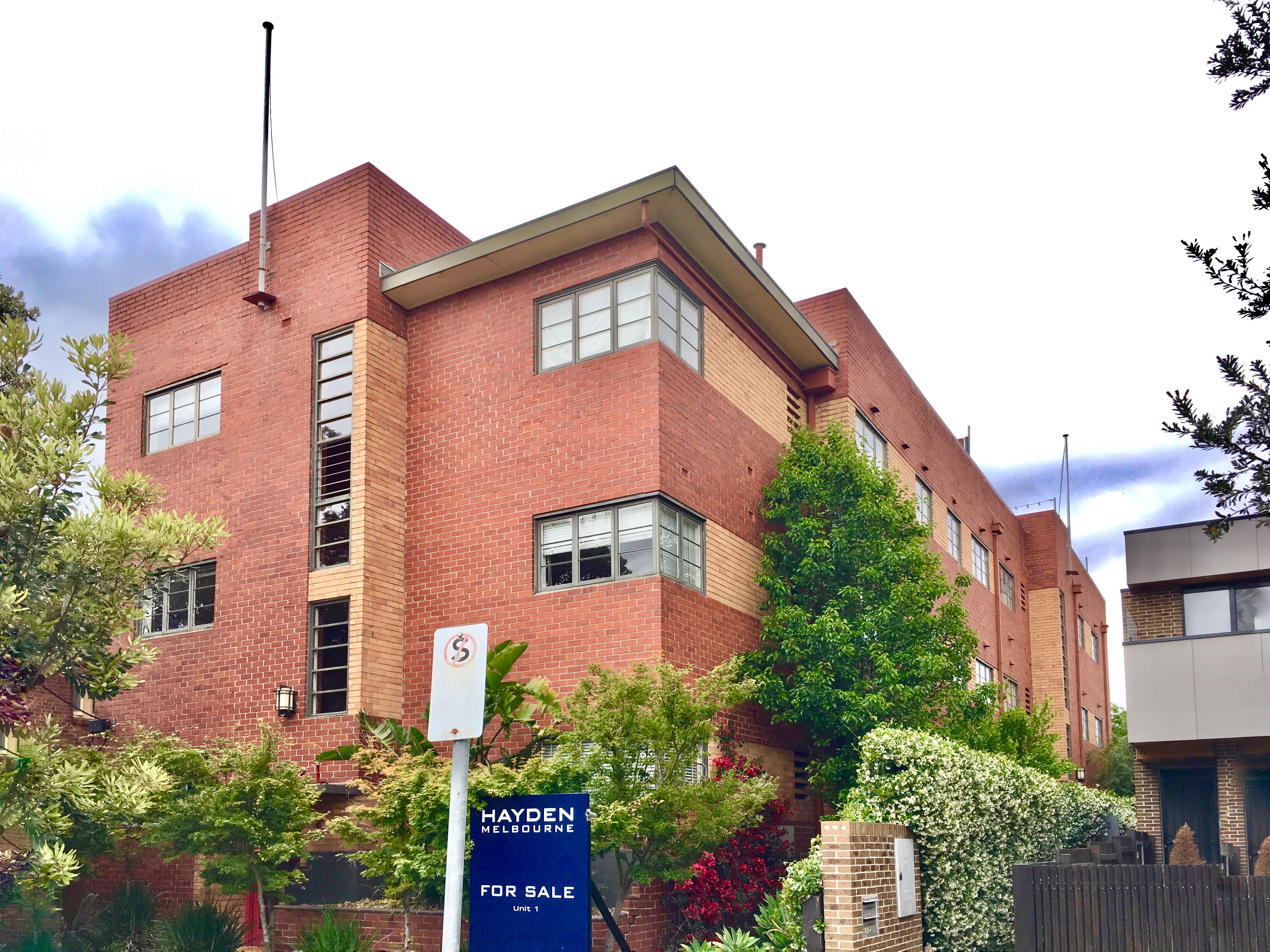
Bellaire Flats, West St Kilda, 1936

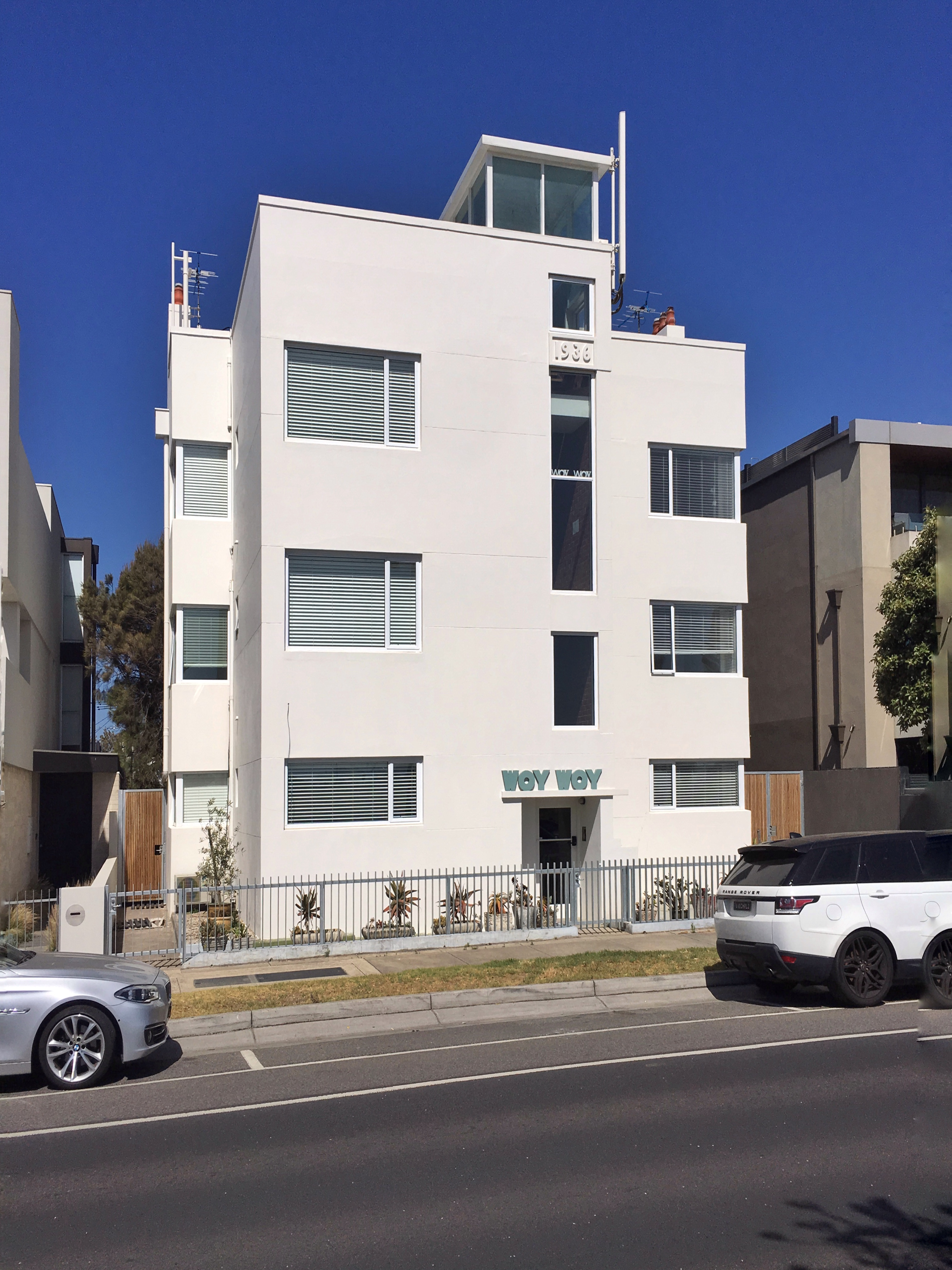
Woy Woy, Elwood, in 2019

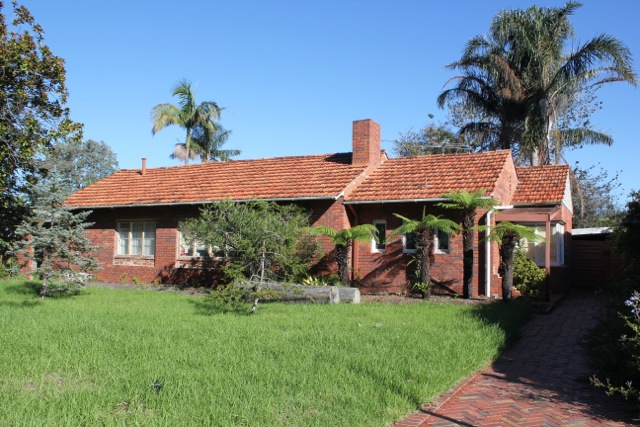
207 Bluff Road, Sandringham, 1938
