= McCraith House =

Heritage-listed house in Melbourne, Victoria, Australia

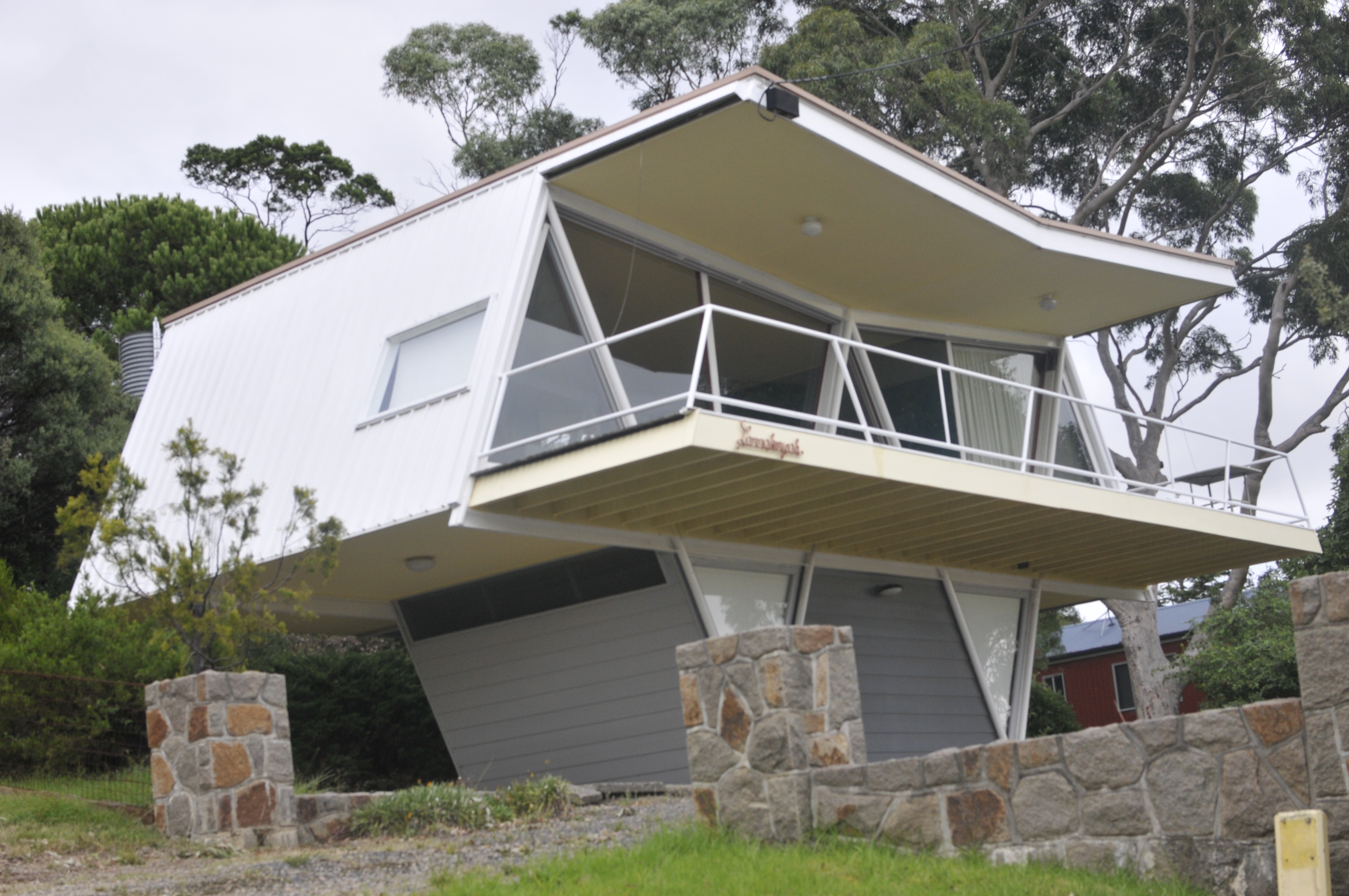
- The house in 2012

- Location of the house in Greater Metropolitan Melbourne
- Alternative names: Larrakeyah; Butterfly House

General information
- Status: Completed
- Type: House
- Architectural style: Structural modernism; Melbourne Regionalism
- Location: 1 Atunga Terrace, Dromana, Mornington Peninsula, Melbourne, Victoria, Australia
- Coordinates: 38°20′41″S 144°57′33″E
- Named for: Larrakeyah: Larrakeyah Barracks, Darwin
- Year built: 1954–1956
- Completed: 1956; 70 years ago
- Renovated: 2014 (by RMIT)
- Client: Gerald and Ellen McCraith
- Owner: RMIT University (since 2013)

Technical details
- Structural system: Prefabricated
- Material: Prefabricated structural steel; timber cladding; glass; stone; concrete; metal sheets (later)

Design and construction
- Architecture firm: Chancellor and Patrick
- Other designers: Edna Walling (garden consultant)
- Main contractor: Max Howell

Renovating team
- Architect: Peter Elliott
- Awards: National Trust of Australia (Victoria) Victorian Heritage Award, 2015

Victorian Heritage Register
- Official name: McCraith House (Larrakeyah)
- Type: Registered place
- Designated: 21 December 2000
- Reference no.: H1906
- Heritage overlay no.: HO6
- Category: Residential buildings (private)

Register of the National Estate
- Official name: McCraith House (former)
- Type: Defunct register
- Designated: undated
- Reference no.: 102949

The McCraith House, also known as Larrakeyah and commonly referred to as the Butterfly House – due to its unique geometric shape – is a modernist house located at 1 Atunga Terrace in Dromana, on the Mornington Peninsula, in the south eastern suburbs of Melbourne, in Victoria, Australia.

Built as a holiday home for Gerald McCraith AM and Ellen McCraith between 1954 and 1956 by emerging Melbourne-based architect partnership Chancellor and Patrick atop a stone walled plinth overlooking Port Phillip Bay, the house is an example of austere structural modernist architecture in Australia. As of 2008, the McCraith House remained close to its original state including "exterior and interior wall colours, furniture, crockery, even the bed linen".

Located on the traditional lands of the Bunurong people, the house was added to the Victorian Heritage Register on 21 December 2000 in recognition of its architectural significance; and was also added to the non-statutory and now defunct Register of the National Estate on an unknown date.

== History ==
Construction of the holiday house began in Easter 1955 for Gerald and Ellen Pearl McCraith. The McCraith's owned several blocks in Atunga Terrace, a relatively undeveloped part of Dromana at the time. The McCraith's engaged the local architectural firm of Chancellor and Patrick to design the building. Part of the brief was for a prefabricated structure that could be quickly and easily erected on the difficult site. The local Dromana builder, Max Howell, supervised the process.

Chancellor and Patrick had a large regional practice based in Frankston. David Chancellor set up in 1952 and was joined by Rex Patrick, two years later. In 1965, they opened an additional office in Melbourne. The work produced by the practice was often experimental with a number of recurring themes, many of which were explored in the McCraith House. For example, an interest in structure, perhaps fuelled by David's Chancellor's experience with an engineering firm, and an interest in landscape design which resulted in Edna Walling being employed as a consultant on many occasions. Both of these considerations, combined with a continuing preoccupation with the place of a building in the bush were major contemporary issues in architecture.

After the completion of the McCraith House at 1 Atunga Terrace, Chancellor and Patrick designed three further houses for Gerald and Ellen McCraith, also in Atunga Terrace, to simpler designs.

=== Recent history ===
The McCraith House featured in several exhibitions by the Mornington Peninsula Regional Gallery, including 'The house on the hill' and 'Desire and identity: The architecture of Chancellor and Patrick' in 2006 and 2010 respectively. The house was featured on a 2006 episode of the Sunday Arts program, broadcast on ABCTV.

In 2013, the McCraith House was gifted by the Dixon-Ward family, descendants of Gerald and Ellen McCraith, to RMIT University and the house was subsequently renovated. Since 2015, the house has served as accommodation for the university's writer-in-residence program.

== Description ==
The Mornington Peninsula was at the forefront of contemporary design in Victoria. In 1950, Robin Boyd asserted that the Peninsula 'deserves credit for having been for over half a century the testing ground for progressive movements in domestic architecture'. In 1958, Neil Clerehan stated that 'almost every generally accepted advance in house design first appeared around our bayside'.

=== Design ===
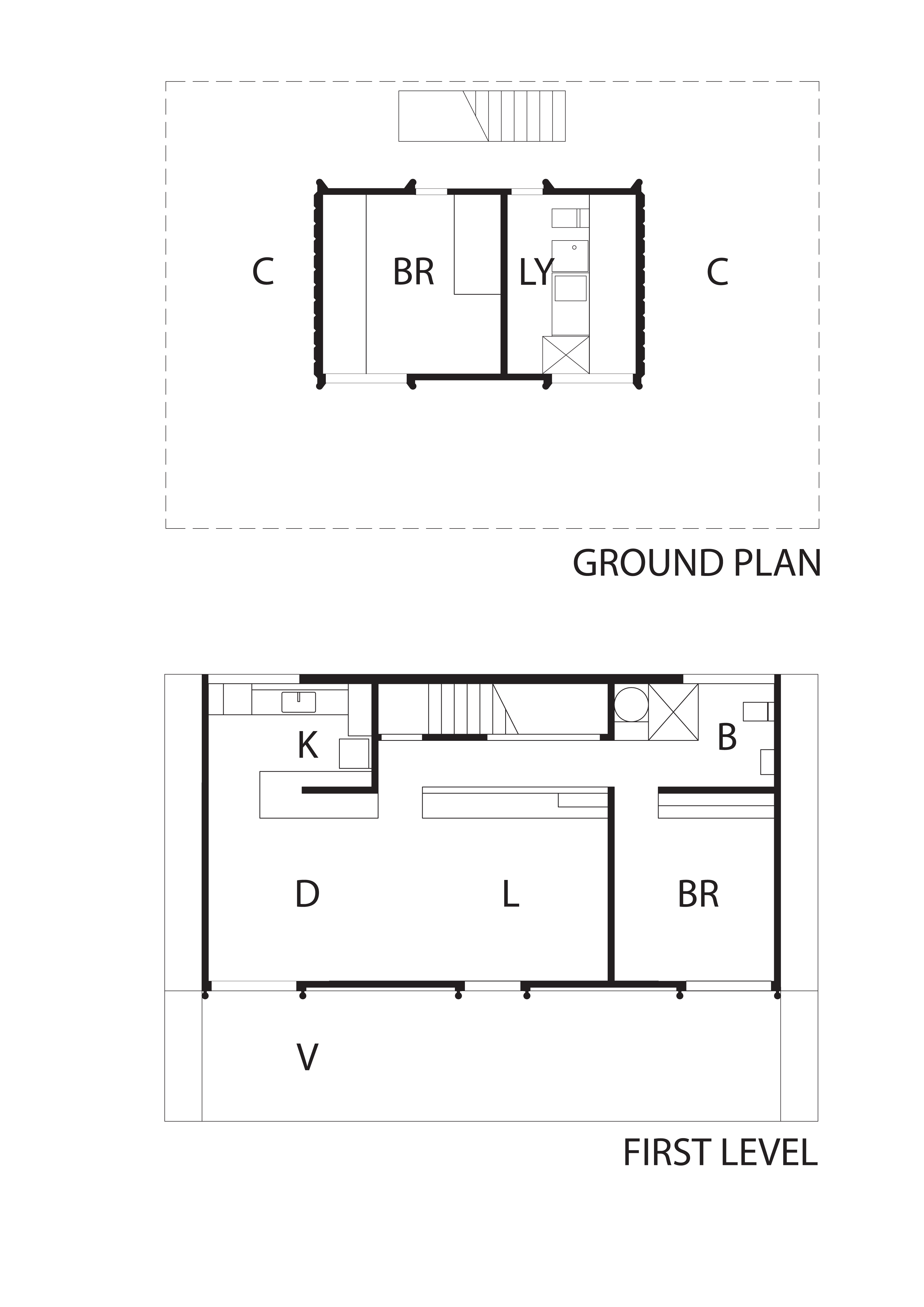
McCraith House floor plan

The layout of the McCraith House set a new standard for holiday houses in Australia, embodying the ideas of structural experimentation, whimsical design, modern planning and the ideals of a 'holiday house'. Positioned precariously on a stone-walled plinth, high above Dromana overlooking Port Phillip Bay, the small house is distinguished by its unusual form creating a dramatic architectural statement. A stone plinth holds the main living and private spaces to emphasize the view of the bay.

The children's bedroom and laundry are located on the ground floor, allowing the main active spaces such as the lounge room to have priority access to the views. The connection to the exterior was strengthened through the open plan living, removing the strict separation of the traditional dining area, lounge and exterior lounge. This provides a more relaxed and free flowing movement within the house, complementing the associated lifestyle of beach-side living. Owing to the increased availability of family cars, a sheltered parking space is included underneath the cantilevered floor resulting in ease of access for residents. The north face is extensively glazed. The projecting balcony is partly sheltered by a winged overhang and enclosed only by a spindly steel pipe balustrade.

The car was given a sense of importance in the design. The driveway leads to a terraced resting place for the car, sheltered by the wing of the building. It is an acknowledgement of the car as the pivot for this holiday lifestyle, connecting the working environs of Melbourne with escape to the Mornington Peninsula.

==== Structural system ====
The defining structural feature of McCraith House is the triangulated tubular steel framing system; and it is one of the earliest examples in Australia to use prefabricated structural steel in a domestic building. The building is constructed using two triangulated truss frames fixed at four points to the massive concrete footings on their inverted apex with 'C' section steel beams and steel cross bracing tying the main frame together. The two main steel floor beams break the truss at half height and these in turn support the deep timber floor joists which are cantilevered at either end. The steel triangular structural system represents the simplification of form that is a familiar aspect within the modernist architecture. The butterfly roof is formed with timber joists in a similar configuration. The first floor extends beyond the small rectangular ground level, allowing for the parking of cars under the overhanging wings. Contained within the splayed walls of the ground floor are a bedroom and laundry area.

The first floor contains a second bedroom, living area and amenities. The dominance of the structural form forces the use of triangular awning windows at ground level with horizontal timber infill panelling between and timber framed triangular sliding doors to the balcony. The original horizontal board siding to the first floor angled walls has been replaced with sheet roof decking.

Ornamentation is derived through the structural elements applied to the exterior, which contrast the classical approach to architectural embellishment. The house maintains the presentation of a modernist building whilst including the prominent architectural vernacular of the verandah. The use of structural steel is minimal, at a time when conventional building materials were in limited supply post-World War II.

== Similar buildings ==
The McCraith House was used as an example of the 'structural functional' idiom of Melbourne Regionalism in the architectural journals of the time alongside the works of Robin Boyd – Bridge House, Toorak (1953-1954) and Pelican House of Daveys Bay (since demolished); Sir Roy Grounds – Leyser House (1950); Harry Seidler, and Peter and Dione McIntyre – house at Kew, (1954-1955). Two major civic buildings were built using tensile structures during the 1950s – the Olympic Swimming and Diving Pools (1956), designed by Borland, Murphy and McIntyre; and the Sidney Myer Music Bowl (1959), by Yuncken Freeman, Griffiths and Simpson.

Elements from the McCraith House are found in the design of Iggulden House located in Beaumaris. The most notable similarities between these two houses are cantilevers created by the projected horizontal lines and butterfly roof. Use of material contrast to emphasize change in program can be recognised in both buildings, where the timber beams of the verandah meet the glass threshold and pass through to the exposed stone walls. The post-and-beam structure is heavily pronounced in the exterior which is also seen in Richard Neutra's Miller House. The materiality of the McCraith House is also comparable to the Miller House through the use of glass and steel in its design to allow natural light to flow through the house. Both are rare examples of domestic steel construction from the mid-twentieth century.

== Etymology ==
The house was originally named by Gerald McCraith as Larrakeyah, as a memory of his time spent at Larrakeyah Barracks in Darwin, during World War II.

== Gallery ==
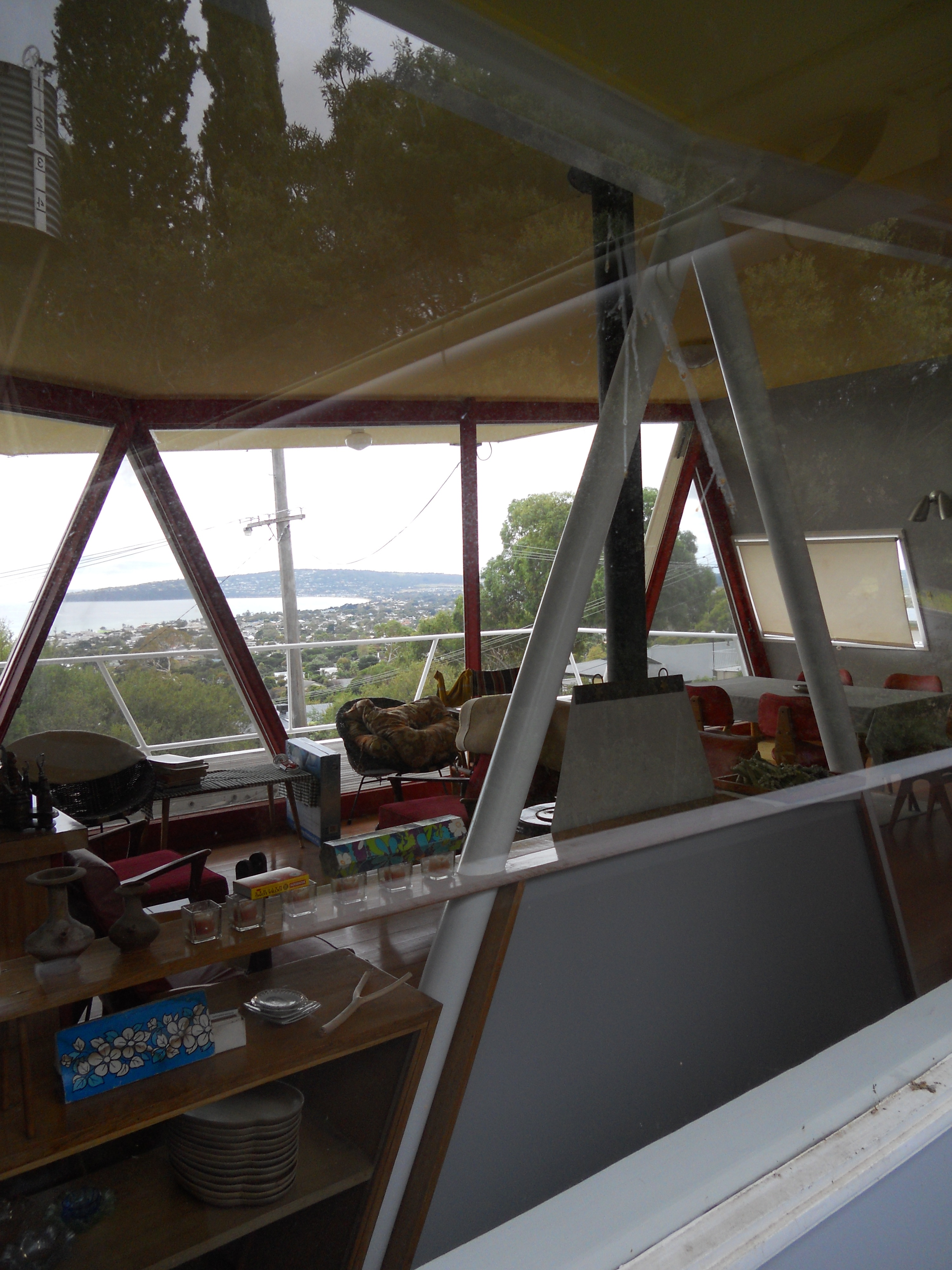
House interior

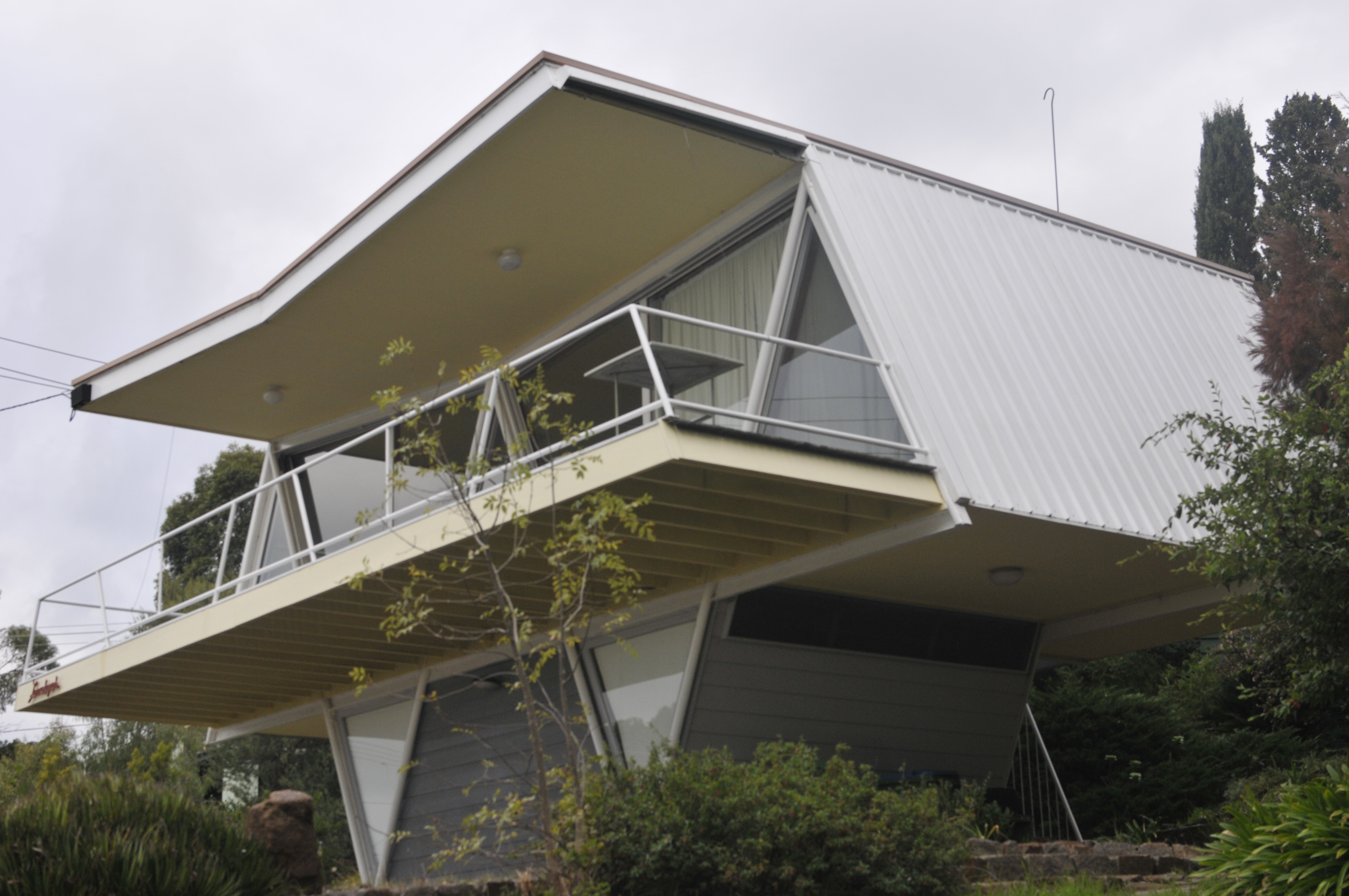
McCraith House exterior

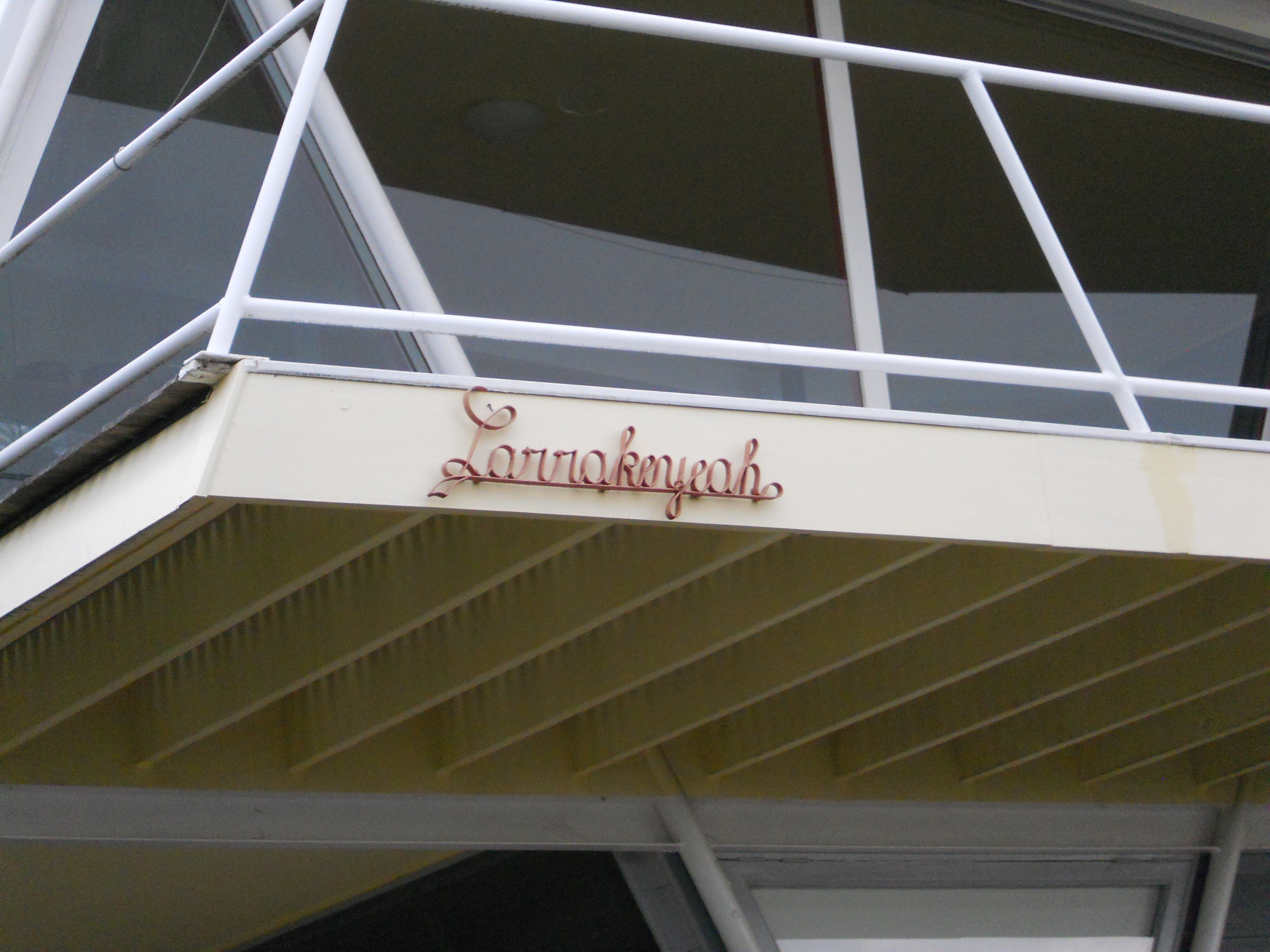
Larrakeyeah sign

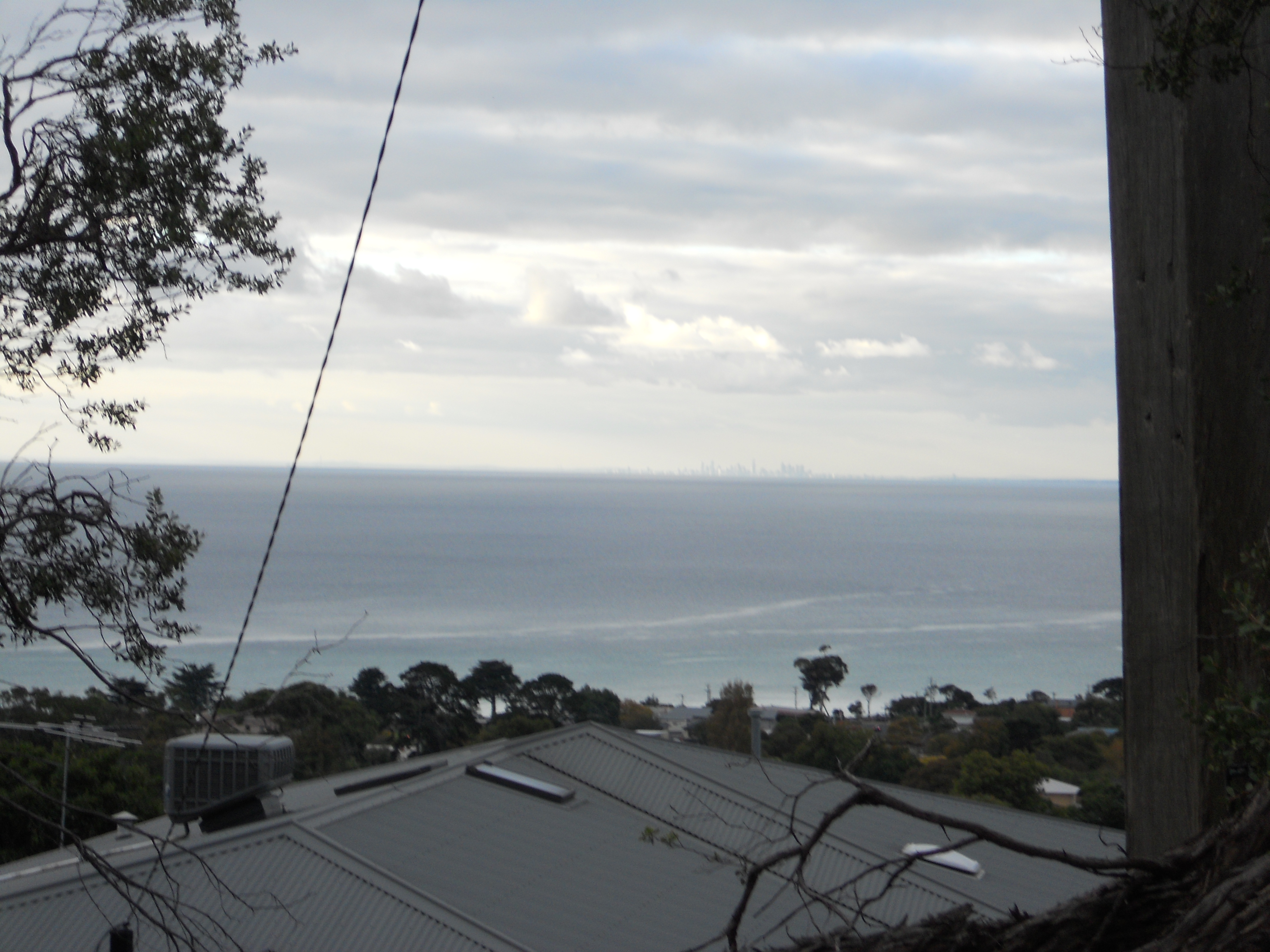
View of bay from house

== See also ==
- Architecture of Melbourne
- List of places on the Victorian Heritage Register in the Shire of Mornington Peninsula
