= Chancellor and Patrick =

Australian architecture firm

Practice information
- Firm type: Partnership
- Founders: William Rex Patrick; David Chancellor
- Founded: 1953
- Dissolved: 1981
- Location: Melbourne, Victoria, Australia

Chancellor and Patrick was an Australian architectural firm, located in Melbourne, Victoria. Formed in 1953 and dissolved in 1981, the firm is best known for their numerous houses from the mid–1950s to the mid–1960s, designed in their signature dynamic, expressive take on 'organic' modernist architecture.

== Background ==
William Rex Patrick (born 28 October 1927) ventured into architecture at a young age, entering into articles at the office of Parnell and Pierce, aged 14 years, for six months. He then studied at Brighton Technical School, went on to the Melbourne Technical College architecture course, and finally the School of Architecture at the University of Melbourne, graduating in 1949.

David Chancellor (born 7 September 1926) studied civil engineering from 1943 to 1945 at the Melbourne Technical College, served two years in the Royal Australia Navy, then went on to the School of Architecture at the University of Melbourne, graduating in 1951.

== The practice ==
The two met in late 1951 at the firm Yuncken Freeman, where they formed a close working relationship, submitting several competitions together. Chancellor set up his own firm in the distant beachside suburb of Frankston in 1952, and Patrick joined him formally in the middle of 1954, establishing the practice of Chancellor and Patrick. In 1958, they established a second office in South Yarra, continued to prosper, and employed 30 staff.

Chancellor and Patrick began with a variety of expressive houses, mostly holiday homes, on the Mornington Peninsula, where the firm began. They soon developed their own distinctive style; an amalgam of features of Frank Lloyd Wright's Prairie and Usonian houses, the houses of Californian architect Harwell Hamilton Harris, and their own innovations. They featured dynamic plans, emphasised by projecting intersecting wings or bays with expressed, overhanging gable or flat roofs, dramatic cantilevers, strong horizontals with occasional verticals, off-centre supports, expressed structure, butt-jointed corner windows, and integration with the landscape. Many can be found on the Mornington Peninsula, as well as many dotted around the 1950s and 1960s suburbs and area of Melbourne, especially the Bayside suburbs. They are said to have designed (if not built) over 1,000 houses in their career. Their houses of the late 1960s onwards were often larger, and evolved into brown brick, skillion roofed compositions, more ground hugging, and more in tune with the 'environmental' designs of their contemporaries. Throughout their career, they also designed many non-residential projects, including a number of churches, pre-school buildings and a hospital, as well as banks and other commercial work. Their largest projects were all the halls of residence at Monash University, and Chisholm College at La Trobe University.

== Key influences and design approach ==
Chancellor and Patrick mediated modernism with concern for the region and site. Their approach to architecture saw the revival Frank Lloyd Wright's Usonian house principles between the 1950s and 1960s. Usonian architecture grew out of Frank Lloyd Wright's earlier Prairie style homes which featured low roofs and open living areas. The style made use of brick, wood, and other natural material. Influenced by the Usonian style, the Freiberg House saw the use of exposed brick and natural Australian timbers. The broad eaves recall not only Melbourne houses of Walter Burley Griffin, but also Californian houses of Harwell Hamilton Harris using similar technique of exposing the purlin beams beyond line of the house. Oregon joinery detailing in the Freiberg house suggest Japanese inspiration influencing for fittings and colour scheme within the house.

== Notable projects ==
=== McCraith House ===
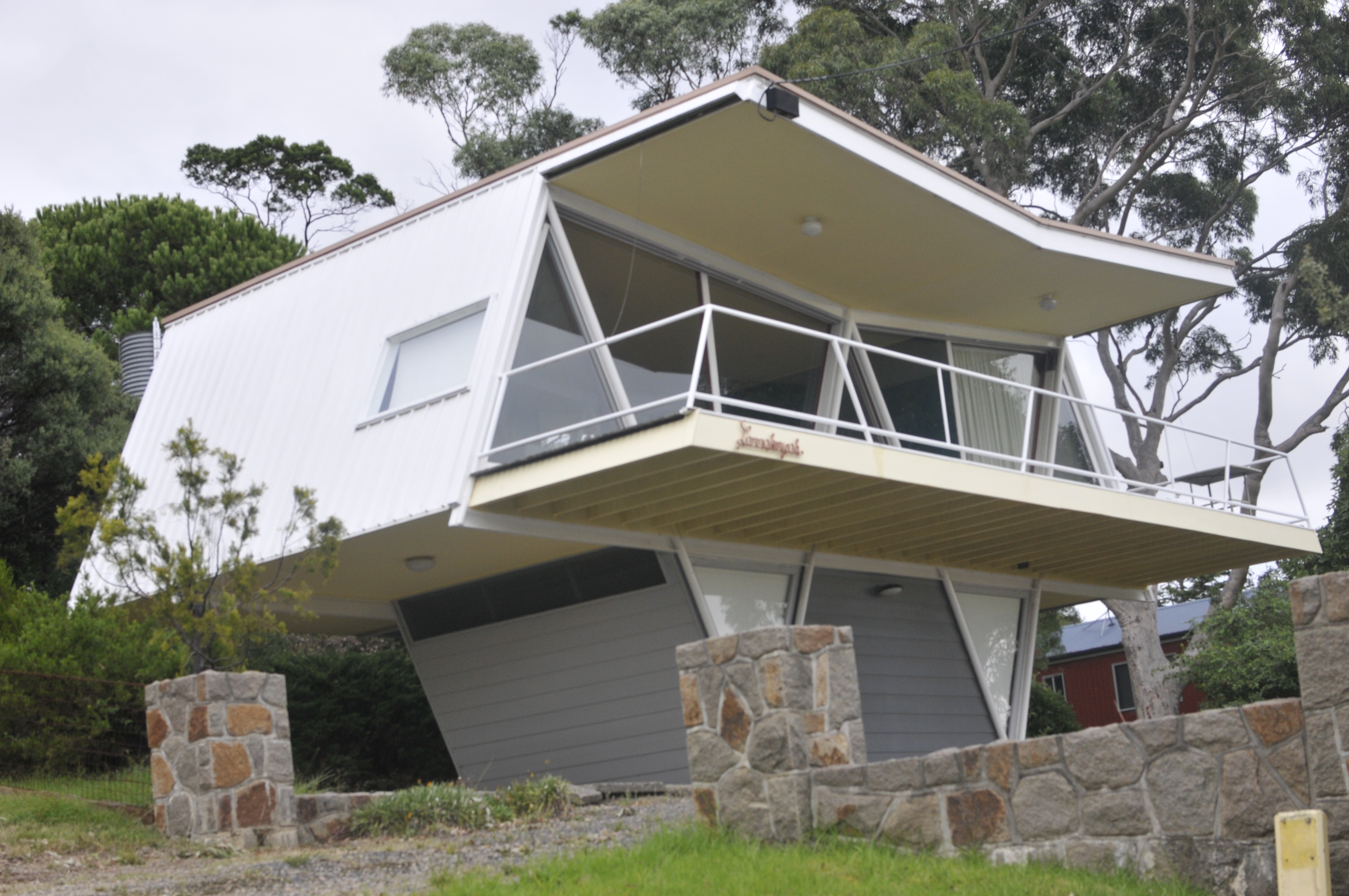
McCraith House

The McCraith House, commonly known as the Butterfly House, was built on the sleepy bush blackboards of the Mornington Peninsula for Ellen and Gerald McCraith in 1954 by Chancellor and Patrick. The McCraith House is an example of structural inspired modernism in the 1950s with its cutting-edge design and ground-breaking structural engineering, of triangular tubular steel framing system and butterfly roof. Positioned strategically on a stone-walled plinth overlooking Port Philip Bay, the house remains in the same family, complete with original interiors, furniture and even crockery all of which was donated to RMIT University in 2013, and the house now houses their writers-in-residence program.

=== ES&A Bank Building ===
The former ES&A Bank Building was built on the corner of Elizabeth and Franklin Street, Melbourne, in 1959–60 by Melbourne architects Chancellor and Patrick. Originally intended to be a 12-storey office tower, only the base banking chamber section was built at the time. The most distinctive features of the building are the massive rock-faced random coursed Dromana granite pier/wall sections, dominating the side elevation, topped by a thin floating slab roof projecting over the recessed front elevation. The space between the stone piers on the Franklin Street elevation is filled with a patterned, vertical ribbed concrete screen. The building is considered to display influences from International modernism, and the organic sensibilities of Frank Lloyd Wright as well as the Griffins. The extra floors were added in 2004, but as an apartment building with regular glass balconies, rather than the originally proposed solid masonry balconies projecting every second floor, and various changes to the original base section have infilled openings in the front facade, and undermined the floating qualities of the original roof.

=== Freiberg House ===
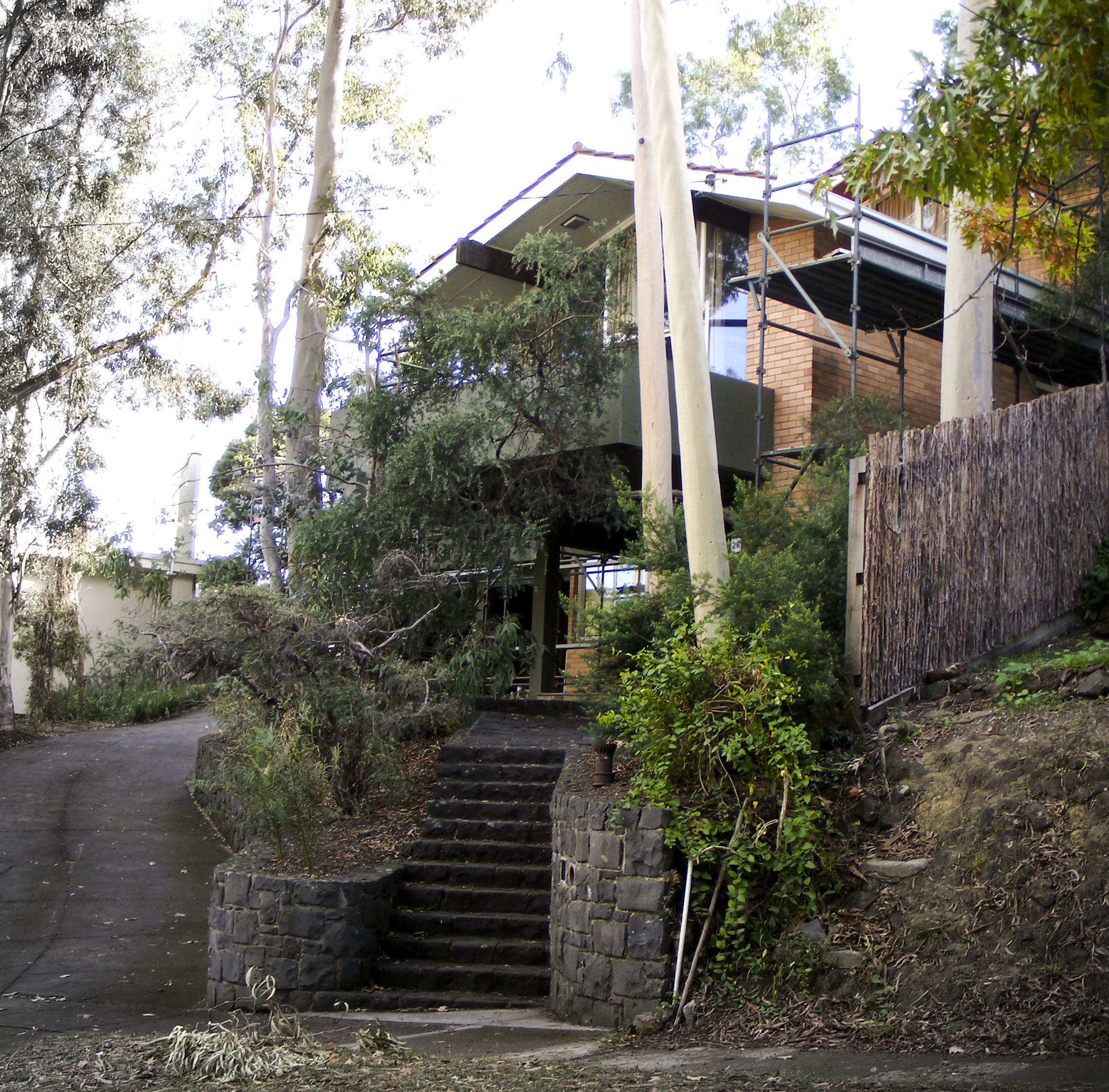
Freiberg House

The Freiberg House was built in 1958-60 on a sloping site as a residence for the Freiberg family and is located at 26 Yarravale Road, Kew. The Freiberg is an example of post-war architecture in Victoria featuring a 2 1/2-storey geometric structure with a modified cruciform plan. Featured on the cover of Best Australian Houses (1961), edited by Neil Clerehan, the Freiberg house was significant for its use of traditional Australian forms and materials, combined with the Melbourne post-war interest in avant-garde planning, forms and structure. It is also notable for having the first entirely native garden planned by Edna Walling, with whom Chancellor and Patrick was a long-time collaborator.

==== Description ====
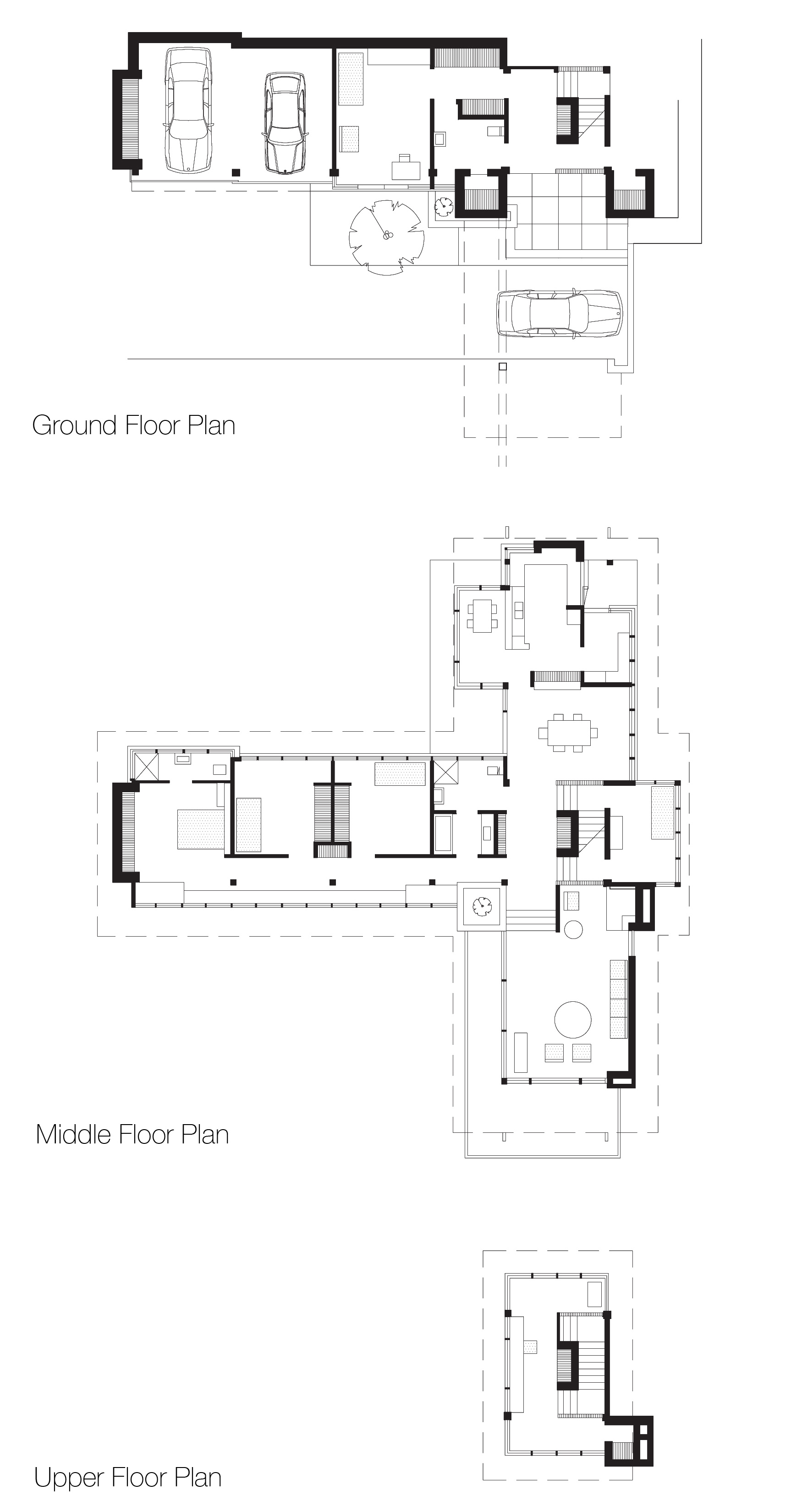
Freiberg House Plans

The Freiberg house is a 2 1/2-storey exposed brick house featuring an axial 'T' plan with low-pitched gable roofs, horizontal bands of windows and its distinctive broad overhanging exposed timber eaves. Each arm of the T serves as a different function: sleeping and bathrooms; living room; or kitchen/dining. At the lowest level are entry, carports/garage and bedsitting room for guests with its own toilet which also serves the hallway. The entry into the house is through two exposed brick piers which lead through the carport to the main entrance. The second level, the main living space, the long arm of the T contains three bedrooms one with its own bathroom and the other two share an elaborate divided bathroom; designed to accommodate the growing Freiberg family. The main living room is projected outwards towards the street with two of the sides opening out onto the terrace. The middle floor features a high vaulted ceiling and cathedral window above the door allowing for natural light to penetrate through the main living spaces. Towards the rear wing of the T are the kitchen and dining areas which is glazed on three of its sides, the other opening to the kitchen. On the upper floor is a private study with windows on all walls allowing for natural light and providing views of the surrounding Studley Park.

The construction of the Freiberg house is predominately brick with sections most notably the balconies and spandrils rendered. A key part of the design was the use of exposed Oregon purlins and brickwork as it was considered avant-garde during the time of construction. The perfection of the house's central brick wall bears witness to the meticulousness of the architect as the first was demolished and rebuilt. Within the house, a range of unadorned timbers was chosen to help reflect the native palette of the landscape creating a harmony between the inside and outside spaces. The landscape designed by Edna Walling is a completely Australian native garden featuring a bluestone wall, built by Eric Hammond, towering gumtrees and other indigenous plants.

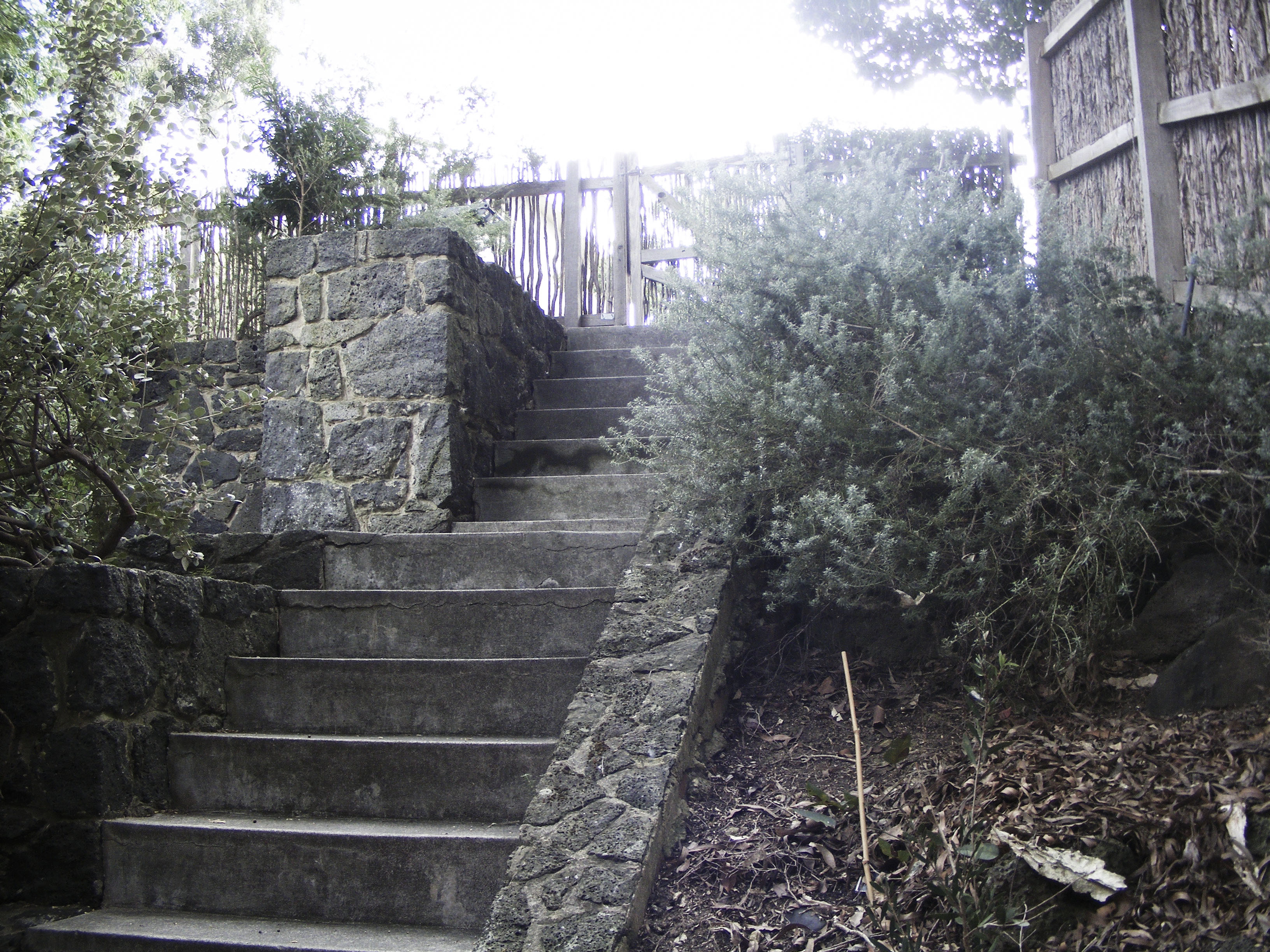
Bluestone steps

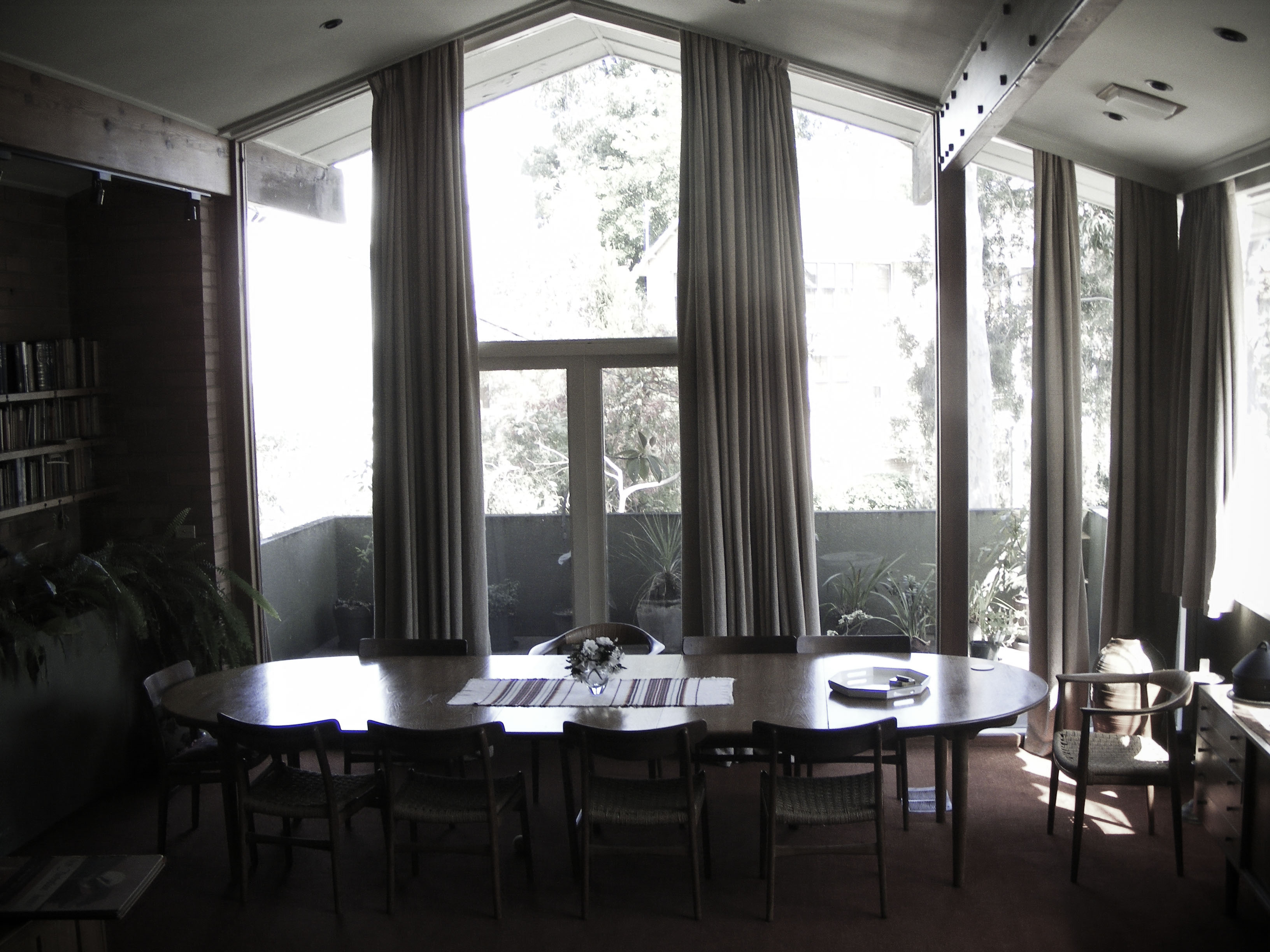
Cathedral-style window

== See also ==
- Architecture of Melbourne
- Modernist architecture in Australia
