= Seccull House =

Heritage-listed house in Melbourne, Victoria, Australia

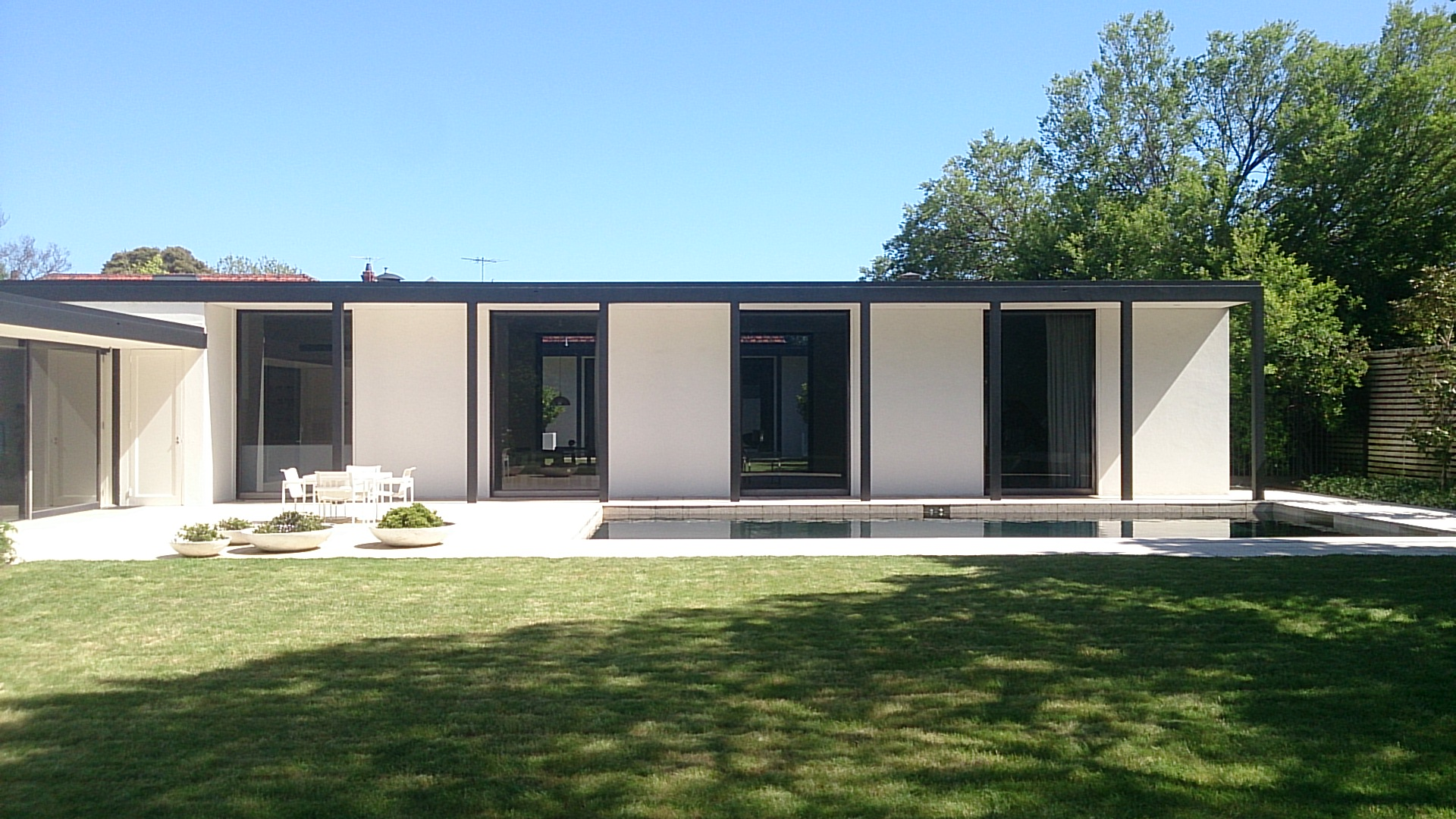
- The north side, viewed from an internal courtyard, 2016

- Location of the house in Greater Metropolitan Melbourne

General information
- Status: Completed
- Type: House
- Architectural style: Modernist
- Location: 23 North Road, Brighton, City of Bayside, Melbourne, Victoria, Australia
- Coordinates: 37°53′54″S 144°59′28″E
- Completed: 1972; 54 years ago
- Client: Elaine and William Seccull

Technical details
- Material: Rendered bricks; glass; steel; ceramic tiles
- Floor area: 560 m^{2} (6,000 sq ft)
- Grounds: 2,100 m^{2} (23,000 sq ft)

Design and construction
- Architect: Guilford Bell

Victorian Heritage Register
- Official name: Seccull House
- Type: Registered place
- Criteria: d.
- Designated: 25 November 2021
- Reference no.: H2406
- Category: Residential buildings (private)

Seccull House is a house located at 23 North Road in Brighton, in the City of Bayside, in the south eastern suburbs of Melbourne, in Victoria, Australia.

Built in 1972 on the traditional lands of the Bunurong people, the house was added to the Victorian Heritage Register on 25 November 2021 in recognition of its architectural significance; and was also added to a non-statutory list by the Victorian branch of the National Trust on 2 July 2002.

== Description ==
Seccull House is a single-storey flat-roofed residence constructed in 1972 to a striking design by noted architect Guilford Bell for Elaine and William (Bill) Seccull – whose family’s construction company built prominent post-war buildings in Melbourne, such as the Kraft Factory (1954) and the Royal Melbourne Children's Hospital (1960).

Serenity and privacy were of prime importance to Bell. The entire property is surrounded by a rendered brick 3-metre-high (10 ft) perimeter wall, within which the flat-roofed F-shaped plan creates two major courtyard / garden spaces. The house is defined by its strong axial arrangement and blends a Modernist sensibility with distinct Classical and Middle Eastern influences. Its stark white walls, punctuated by black sliding doors and steel columns, create a strong visual impression.

The design was provoked by a previous work by Bell, a fantasy of simplicity and purity, and the Secculls requested a translation of this garden temple into a home. Bell himself felt that his relationship with the clients, the Secculls, was one of the most satisfying of his career, and the result one of his most pleasurable works.

Large areas of travertine paving outside flow inside through full-height windows into travertine paved circulation spaces. The house has a powerful orthogonal geometry that reaches back from the street in a series of courtyard, corridors and wings defining a sequence of spaces and axes that define the entire site.

The 500-to-560-square-metre (5,382 to 6,028 sq ft) house was extensively restored in 2015 in consultation with Bell's former partner, Graham Fisher.

Set on a 2,100-square-metre (23,000 sq ft) site, the house with five bedrooms, five bathrooms, two living / lounge rooms, a guest room / studio, triple-car garage, and an in-ground solar-heated swimming pool, was listed for sale in 2026 with expectations of A$17.5 million; having previously sold in 2017 for c. $9 million.

Bell was commissioned by the Secculls in 1973 to design Seccull Beach House in Lorne.

== See also ==
- Architecture of Melbourne
- List of places on the Victorian Heritage Register in the City of Bayside
