= Simon House, Mount Eliza =

House in Melbourne, Australia

Simon House
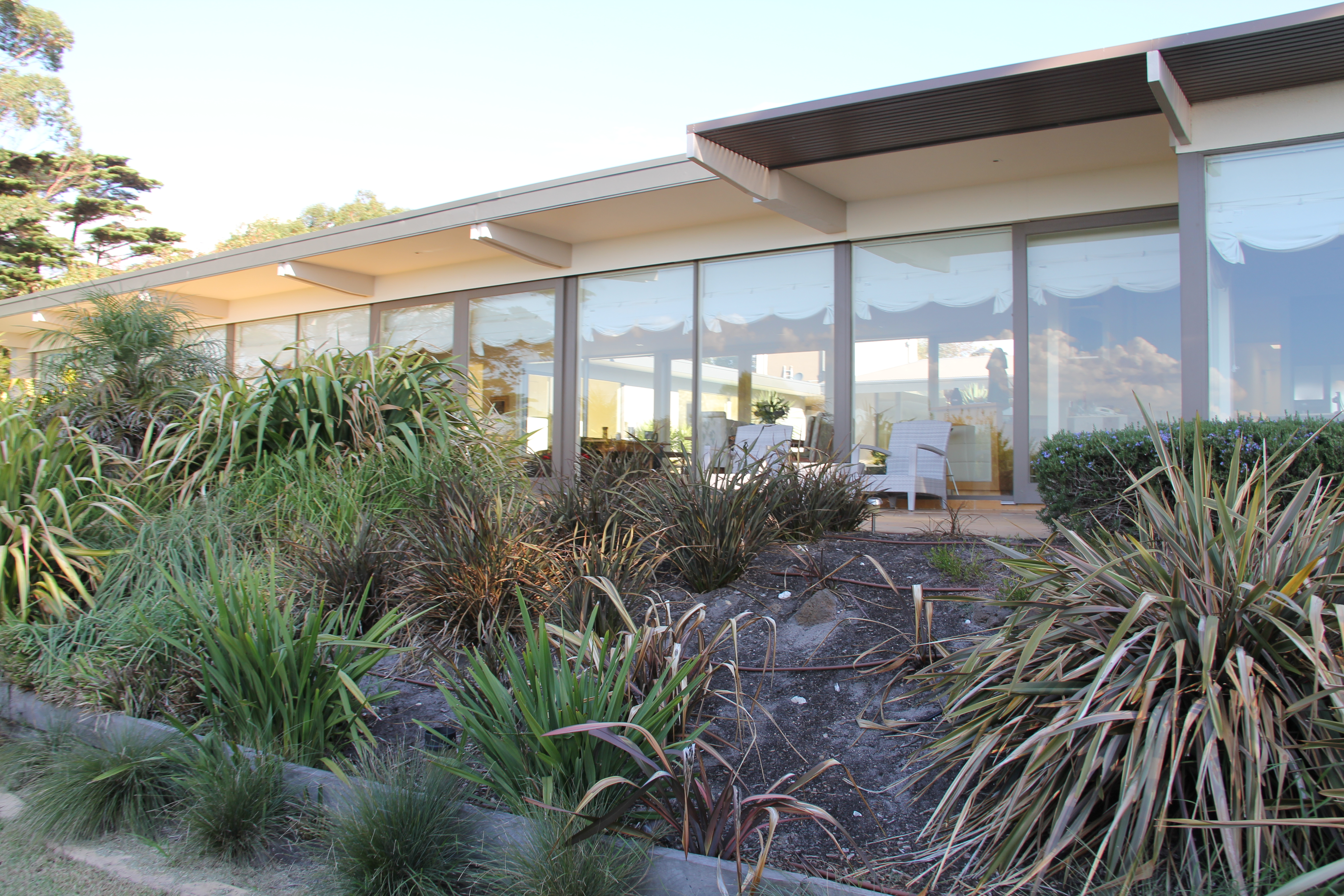
- A view of the outside terrace

- Location of the house in Greater Metropolitan Melbourne

General information
- Status: Completed
- Type: House
- Architectural style: Modernist
- Location: 33 Daveys Bay Road, Mount Eliza, Australia
- Coordinates: 38°09′52″S 145°05′22″E
- Completed: 1963; 63 years ago
- Client: Simon family

Technical details
- Material: Fibrous plaster; steel; timber; reinforced concrete; glass

Design and construction
- Architects: Guilford Bell OBE; Neil Clerehan
- Awards: Victorian Architecture Medal (1964)

The Simon House is a house located at 33 Daveys Bay Road in Mount Eliza, on the Mornington Peninsula, in the south eastern suburbs of Melbourne, in Victoria, Australia.

The house was constructed in 1963, during the period of architectural experimentation on materiality and structure in houses. Simon House was the first project received on the day when Guilford Bell OBE and Neil Clerehan opened their office in South Yarra. The Simons were Clerehan's partners and the house was a collaboration of partners. Therefore, the house has a mixture of both Clerehan and Bell's typical Modernist style.

== Description ==
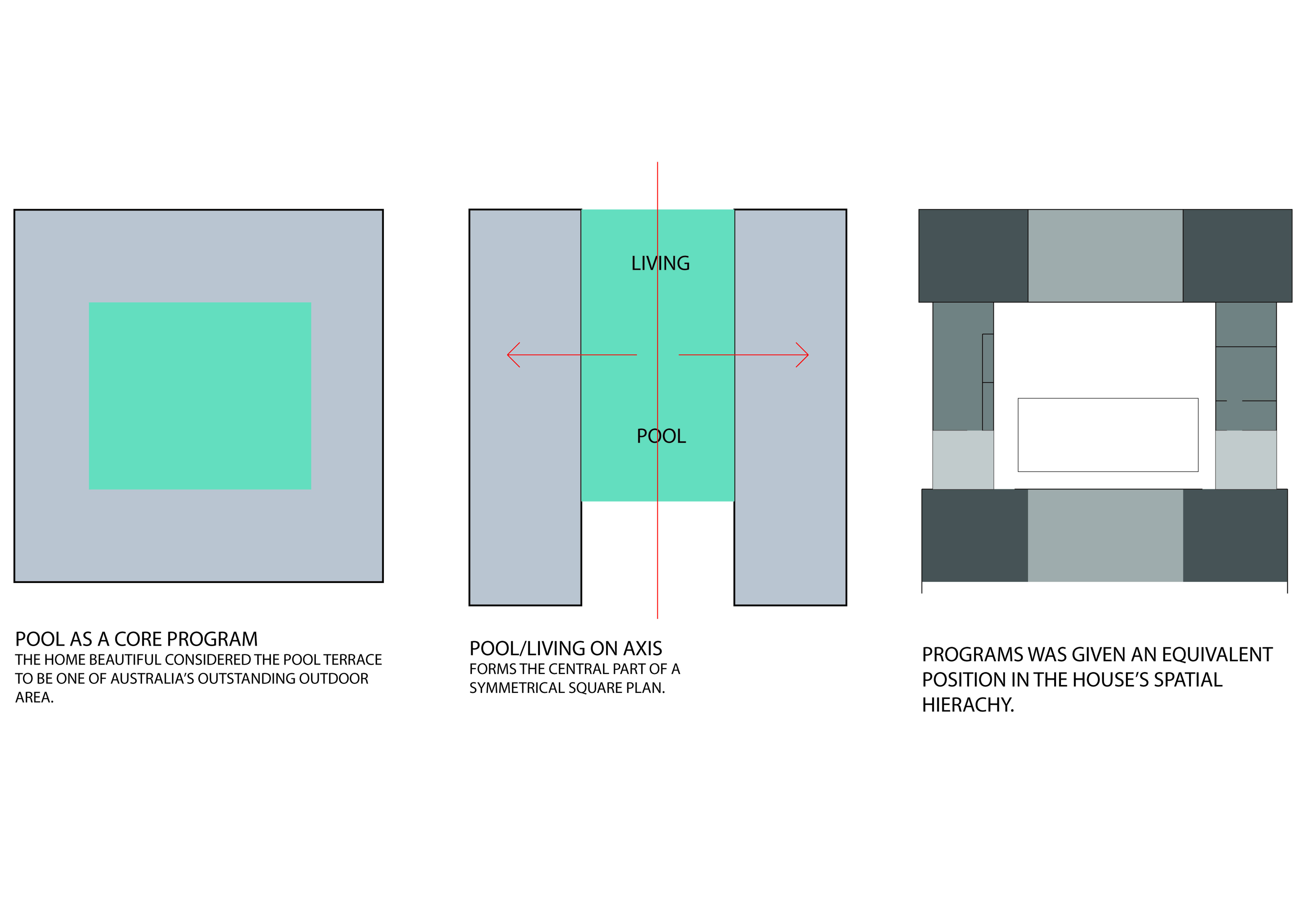
Design diagram

The house is a single-storey house, planned in a rectangular shape, and consists of five bedrooms, two toilets, two garages, a kitchen, a dining room, a living room, pool and terrace. The enclosed pool, natural finishes, glazed wall and an extensive view over the bay recalled contemporary Californian house of architects like Craig Ellwood.

=== Design ===
The central core of the house was a pool and terrace, positioned in the centre of the house, with programs surrounds that engaged with it, allowed members of the Simon family to gather together. It was said that was one of Clerehan's conception of the house where how he deal with the provision of a frame for family life. The pool and living room aligned on axis, forming the central part of a symmetrical square plan. Then the programs around the pool were given a corresponding position in the house's spatial hierarchy. Because of this distinct insistence of having an equivalent position of programs, the programs are mirrored and consist of dual garages and entrances. It was said that was one of Bell's typical Modernist style.

Bell was influenced by the architecture and gardens of Japan. As a countryman, he feels, when in the city, a hunger for the freedom of sky and vegetation. He thinks that a building must stand in spectacular relationship to its environment. With the pool and terrace positioned in the centre of the house, the engagement between the indoor and outdoor spaces then became ambiguous. It creates a sense of feeling when one is inside, it will feels like outdoors and when one is outside it will feels like indoors. One of his design principles was that he thinks of views or views from the building first, instead of the form of the building.

The materials used in the house were unadorned, and included fibrous plaster ceiling left in natural, unpainted state, a flat steel decking roof, timber walls, and reinforced concrete floor slab under concrete block. Glass panels are used across the living and dining areas to capture the view of the bay.

=== Modifications ===
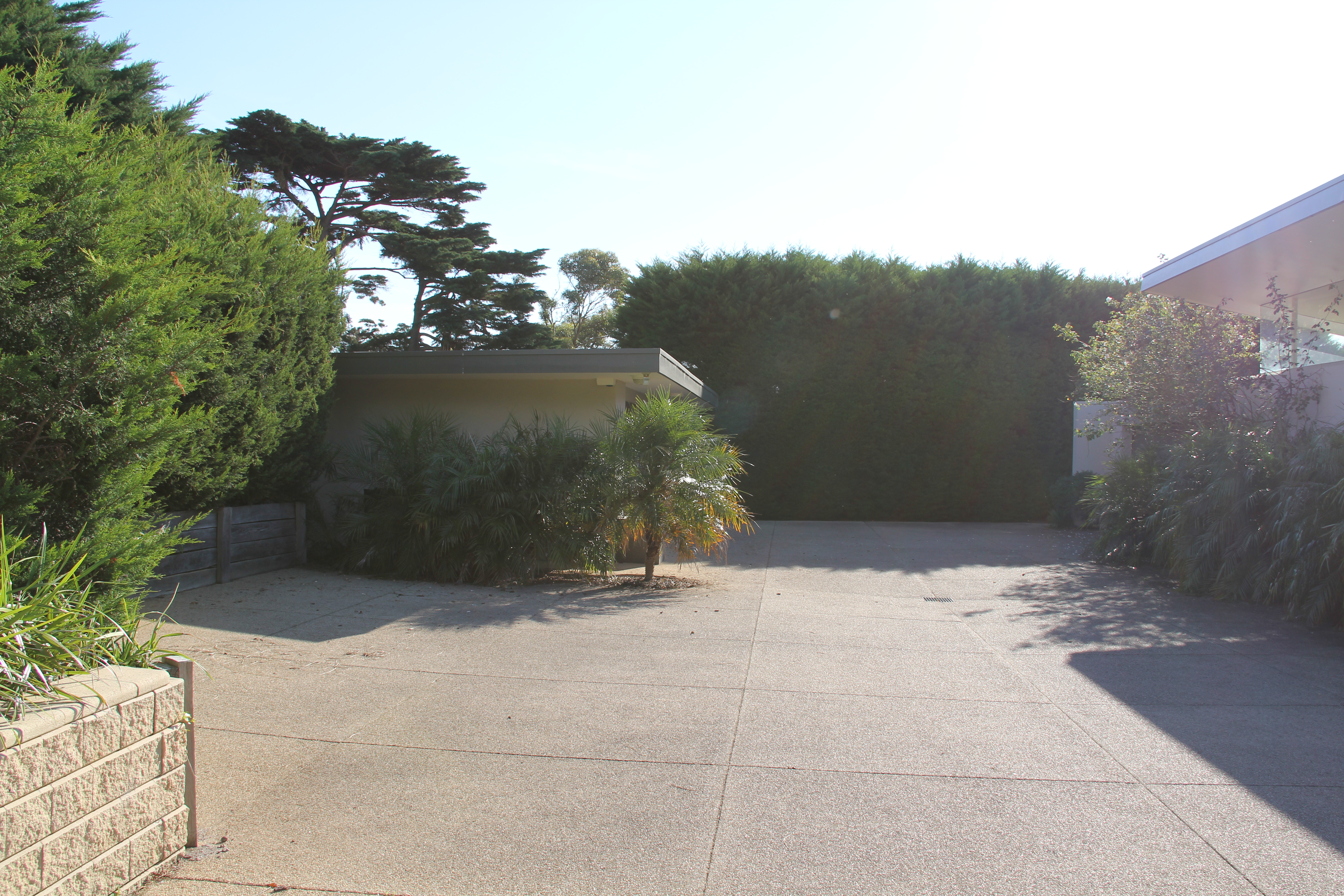
View of garage in 2012

One of the garages was renovated into a main entrance and as a living room. Another garage was built opposite the existing garage. Consequently, some of the spatial qualities of the house were lost, however, it allows a convenient use to the owner in the house's circulation.

== Awards ==
Neil Clerehan and Guilford Bell received numerous honours for their architectural works while they were practicing architecture. The Simon House was the most prominent work of the Bell Clerehan partnership and was awarded the Victorian Architecture Medal in 1964.

The Home Beautiful magazine considered the pool and terrace to be one of Australia's outstanding outdoor areas.
