= Guilford Bell =

Australian architect (1912–1992)

- Born: Guilford Marsh Bell; 21 December 1912; Brisbane, Queensland
- Died: 9 January 1992 (aged 79); Melbourne, Victoria
- Education: Queensland Institute of Technology; University College London
- Occupation: Architect
- Awards: Victorian Architecture Medal 1964
- Buildings: Simon House, Mount Eliza; Fairfax Pavilion, Bowral; Drysdale Homestead, Killcare Heights; McGrath House; Beddison Swift House; Seccull House, Brighton

Guilford Marsh Bell (21 December 1912 – 9 January 1992) was an Australian Modernist architect, active following from World War II until his death in 1992. During his early studies Bell travelled extensively, drawing influences that were later reflected for his projects. Bell worked prolifically both individually and in various partnerships, allowing him to produce many architectural works. Uncommonly, Bell contributed to local and interstate projects including homesteads, pavilions, suburban houses, large commercial and industrial establishments. Bell died in Melbourne in 1992. His latest practice – Guilford Bell & Graham Fisher Architects – continues under the directorship of Graham Fisher.

== Life and work ==
=== Early years and education ===
Born into a successful farming family in 1912, Bell was initially educated at the Queensland University of Technology until the dis-accreditation of his qualifications resulted in his relocation to England where he joined the practice of Albert Richardson. Completing his architectural education under the supervision and tutelage of Richardson and Professor H. O Corfiato of University of London, Bell matriculated as an associate of the Royal Institute of British Architects, additionally recognising Bell as an architect within Australia.

=== Travel and war service ===
During his time in England, Bell was involved with home renovations for Agatha Christie, with whom he had already a friendship from a meeting in Australia in the early 1930s.

Bell accompanied both Christie and her husband Sir Max Mallowan, a renowned archaeologist, on a series of digs in Syria. While there he made s series of drawings, some of which were later published by the British Museum magazine. The architecture of the middle east may have influenced the young Bell, with elements such as enclosed courtyards and arcaded loggias later appearing in his work.

The onset of World War II saw Bell return to Australia and enlist in the Royal Australian Air Force serving in Morotai before assignment as a liaison officer to the United States Air Force located in the Northern Territory, and also spent time in Canberra.

After the war ended, Bell took a position with Ansett Australia, under the official Ansett architect, J. A. La Gerche, to assist and to act as onsite supervisor of the construction of the first Australian luxury international resort on Hayman Island, the Royal Hayman Hotel. Opening in 1950, it consisted of a large central dining and lounge with entertainment stage, and a series of simple skillion roofed cabins symmetrically arranged either side.

=== Architectural practices and partnerships ===
After working for Ansett, Bell began a private practice in Melbourne in 1952 where he designed houses for mainly wealthy clients, which he would continue for the rest of his career.

Nine years later, Bell formed a partnership with Neil Clerehan. Although both had similar architectural leanings in their obsession with privacy and blank walls, the pair terminated their joint practice in 1964 due to fundamentally differing design ideas. Working as a sole practitioner again, the following decade saw Bell design some of his most well known buildings, including his most renowned work, the pavilion James Fairfax AC commissioned to be built in Bowral, NSW. In 1983, now entering his seventies, Bell invited Graham Fisher to form a partnership. Fisher and Bell worked together until Bell's death in 1992.

== Projects ==
=== Simon House, Mount Eliza, VIC ===
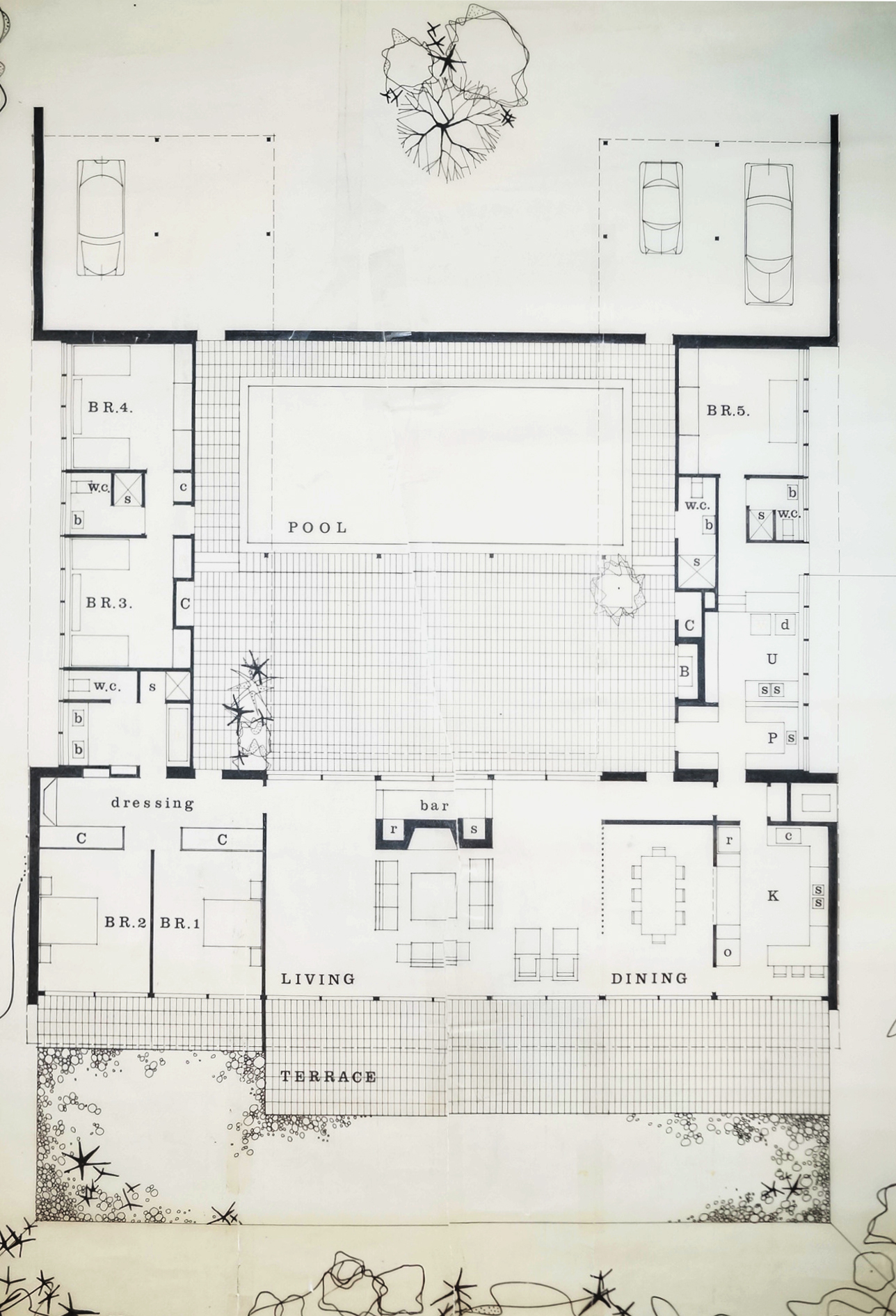
Showing the distribution of rooms in the Simon House in an original floor plan

The modernist approach that the Bell Clerehan Partnership adopted for the design of the Simon House, is very prototypical of Bell's architectural style. Being a countryman, the relationship between the land and architecture was very significant to Bell. This is why "an integrated sequence of interior and exterior spaces", was affiliated to combine the living quarters around a centred terrace and swimming pool. Glazed panels wrap the living and dining room spaces, to fully appreciate the views of the Mornington Peninsula. Symmetry is abundant throughout the single-storey floor plan and program is mirrored in an even trend throughout. This project won the Victorian Architecture Medal in 1964.

=== Drysdale Homestead, Killcare Heights, NSW ===
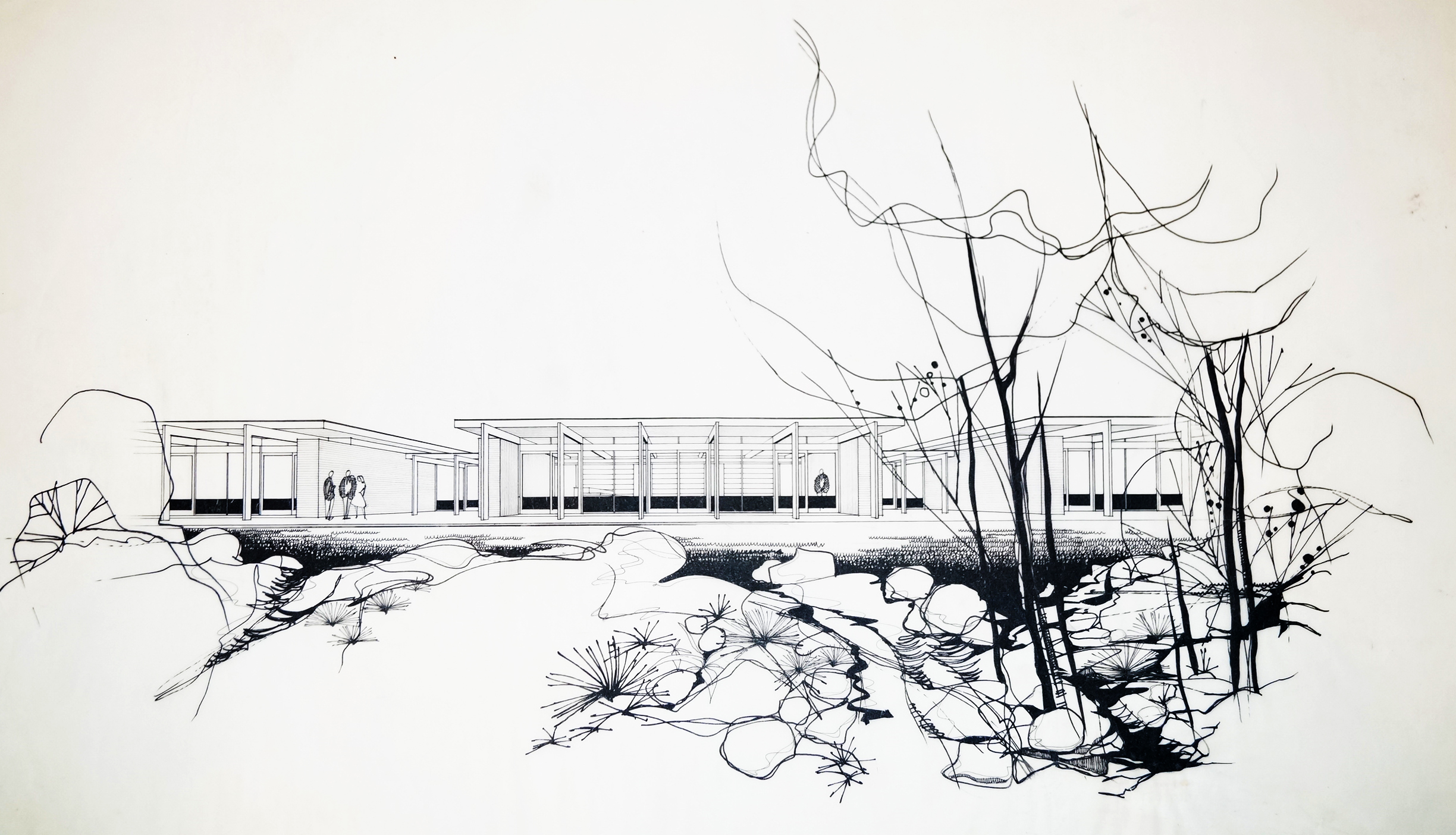
Original drawing of Drysdale Homestead

During the 1960s, Bell's focal projects were based on his interest with homesteads. The Drysdale House, set on Killcare Heights, has extensive views over inland waterways and distant hills which set the design theme of the house – "Everything should face that view which must be framed and punctuated." The design consists of three separate pavilions connected by courtyards and lower roofed gallery halls. An important element of the design is the structural beams which begin to be expressed internally, and continue to exit externally to frame the northern facing view.

=== Fairfax Pavilion, Retford Park, Bowral, NSW ===
The Fairfax Pavilion, at Retford Park in Bowral, was designed purposely by Bell to complement the scenery. In its classically Grecian style, it has been called the "most poetic garden and pavilion" that Bell has constructed. His desire to combine nature and architecture is achieved by the elongated pool and the pond which harmonise the flow of the environment throughout and the garden room inside the pavilion to complete the scene. The “evergreen laurel hedge” and glazing enclose the 1986 structure to create an order of privacy yet still allowing the boundary of inner and outer space to feel ambiguous.

=== McFarlane House, Vaucluse, NSW ===
Located in Vaucluse, in Sydney's eastern suburbs, the elevated site is positioned with north and west harbour views. Designed at the same time as the Seccull House in 1972, the project's prominent characteristic of arches was a request from the client. The entrance from the single-storey block, takes the participant across to swimming pool and courtyard, passing by a view the Opera House and Harbour Bridge from the entrance hall. This gave inspiration to the "whole logic and layout of the house". This invokes a memorable sequence the participant follows, with elements from the Seccull House.

=== Seccull House, Brighton, VIC ===
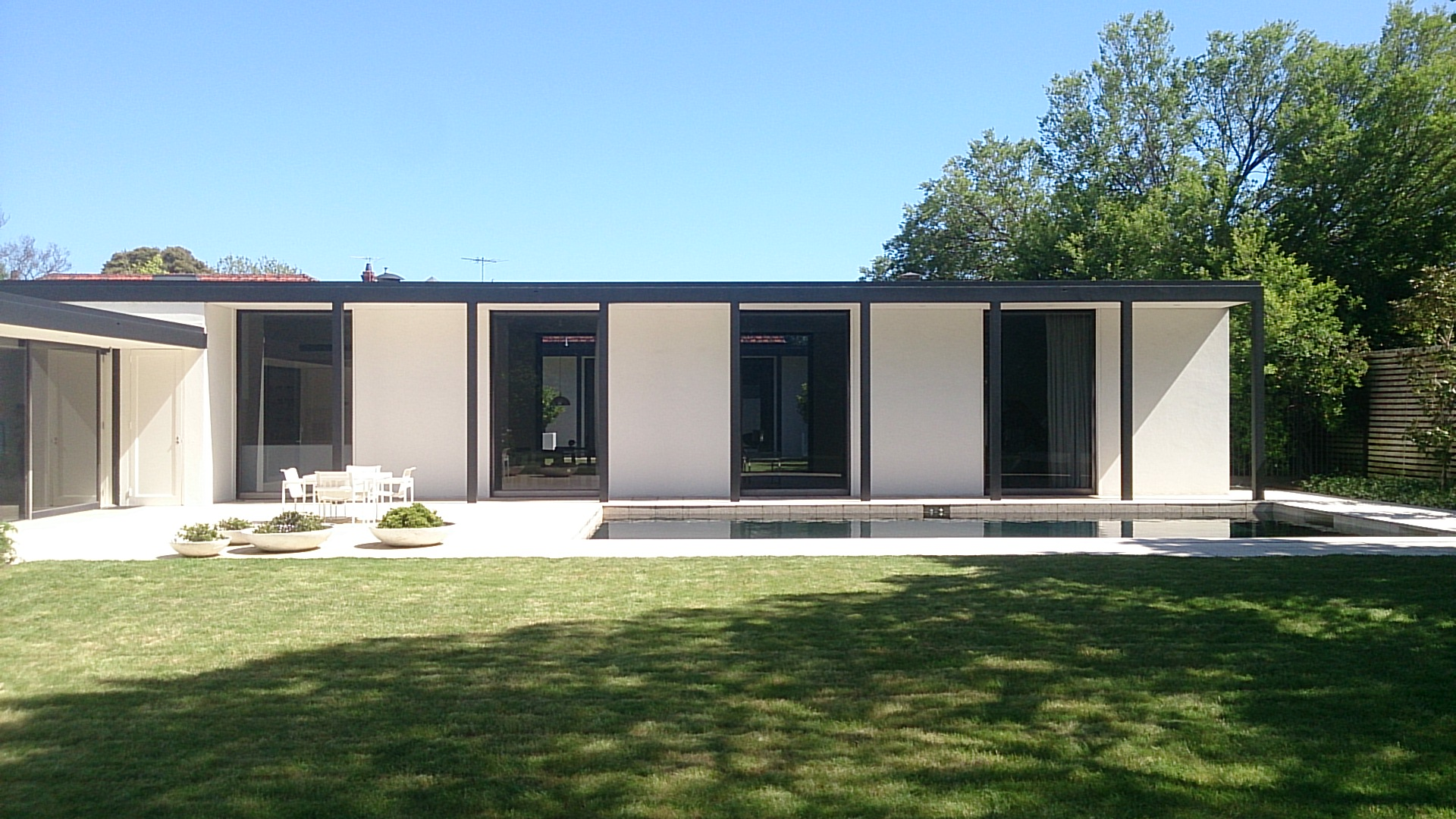
Seccull House, Brighton, in 2016, built in 1972

The design was provoked by a previous work by Bell, a fantasy of simplicity and purity, and the Secculls requested a translation of this garden temple into a home. Bell himself felt that his relationship with the clients, the Secculls, was one of the most satisfying of his career, and the result one of his most pleasurable works.

Serenity and privacy were of prime importance to Bell. The entire property is surrounded by a rendered brick three-metre perimeter wall, within which the flat-roofed F-shaped plan creates two major courtyard / garden spaces. Large areas of travertine paving outside flow inside through full height windows into travertine paved circulation spaces. The house has a powerful orthogonal geometry that reaches back from the street in a series of courtyard, corridors and wings defining a sequence of spaces and axes that define the entire site. This house, which is approximately 500 square metres (5,400 sq ft), was extensively restored in 2015. Prior to 2015, it had only been altered in parts. In late 2021, Seccull House was added to the Victorian Heritage Register, identified as being of "architectural significance to the State of Victoria."

Bell was commissioned by the same clients in 1973 to design Seccull Beach House in Lorne, Victoria.

=== Grant House, Officer, VIC ===
Considered the last residential project which Bell completed with Fisher, the Grant House is a well-renowned work of architecture. The "pyramidal" roof reflects his interest from his travels in the Middle East and gives a certain eccentricity to the building. The way in which the residence sits centrally in the expansive landscape is modelled off an André Le Nôtre work, Vaux-le-Vicomte. The distant scenery gives views of the Gippsland Ranges and due to the sloping of the land, stairs have been introduced as a practical and symmetrical way to order the landscape design. This building has become a National-trust listed project, and subsequently heritage listed by the local council.

== Awards ==
The Simon House, Mt Eliza was awarded the Victorian Architecture Medal in 1964.

The University of Queensland established the Guilford Bell Scholarship award in 2009, 'maintained by a bequest from the late Orme Augusta Marsh', Bell's sister. The scholarship is awarded to an advanced student to study international architectural methods.

== Gallery ==
Images and sketches of Bell's works
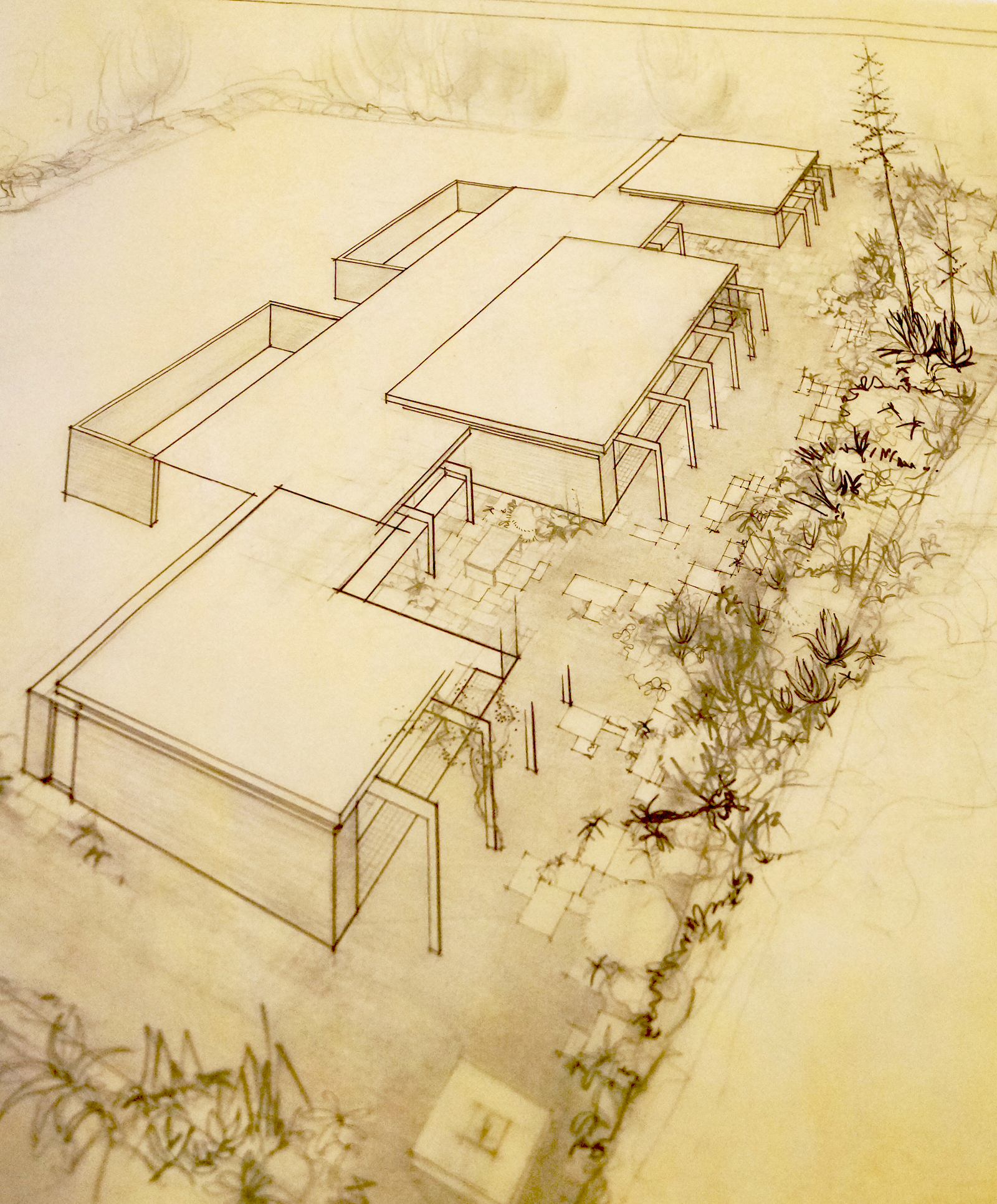
Drysdale Homestead; perspective sketch by Bell, 1965

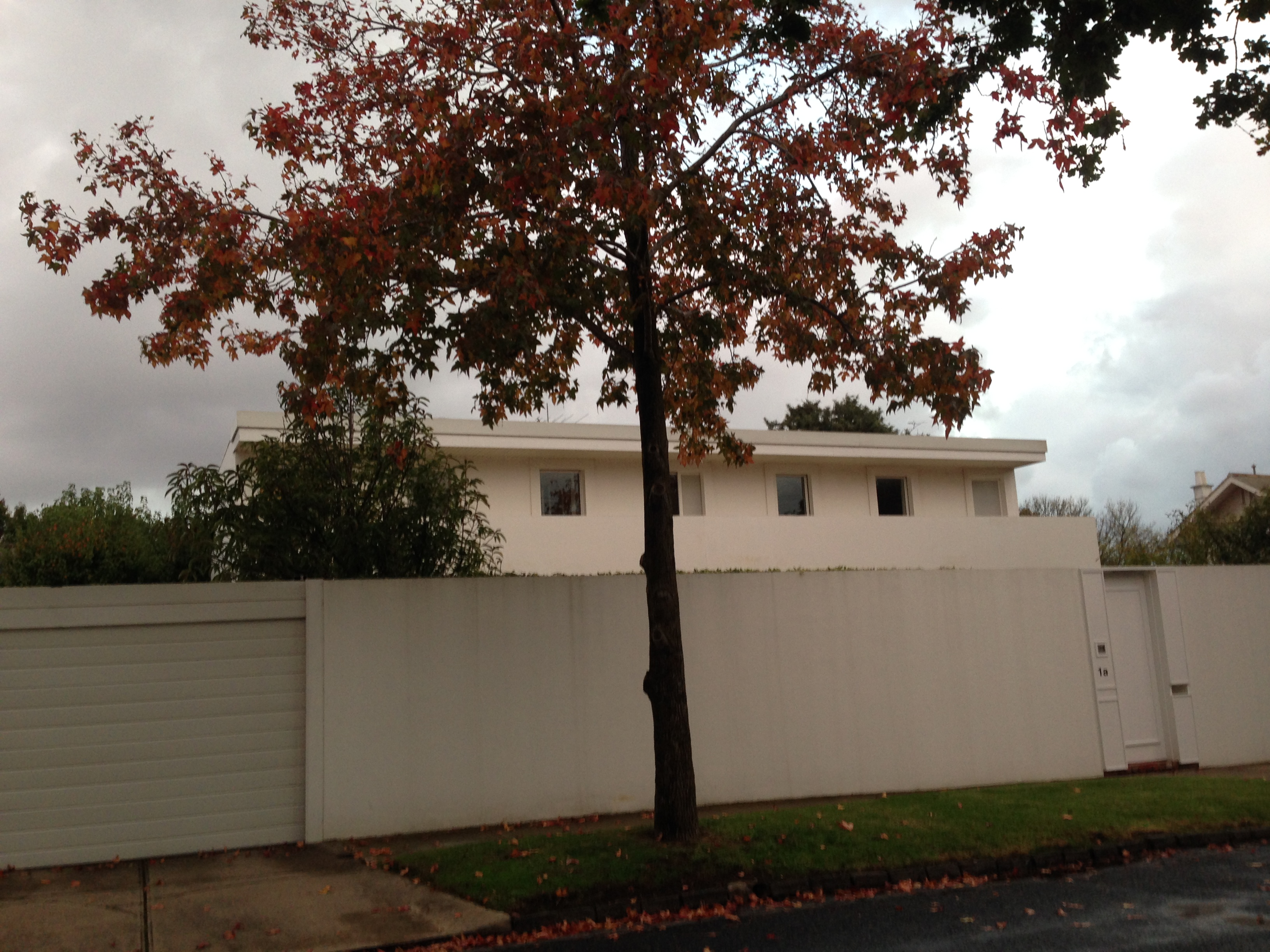
Clemenger House, Toorak, 1983

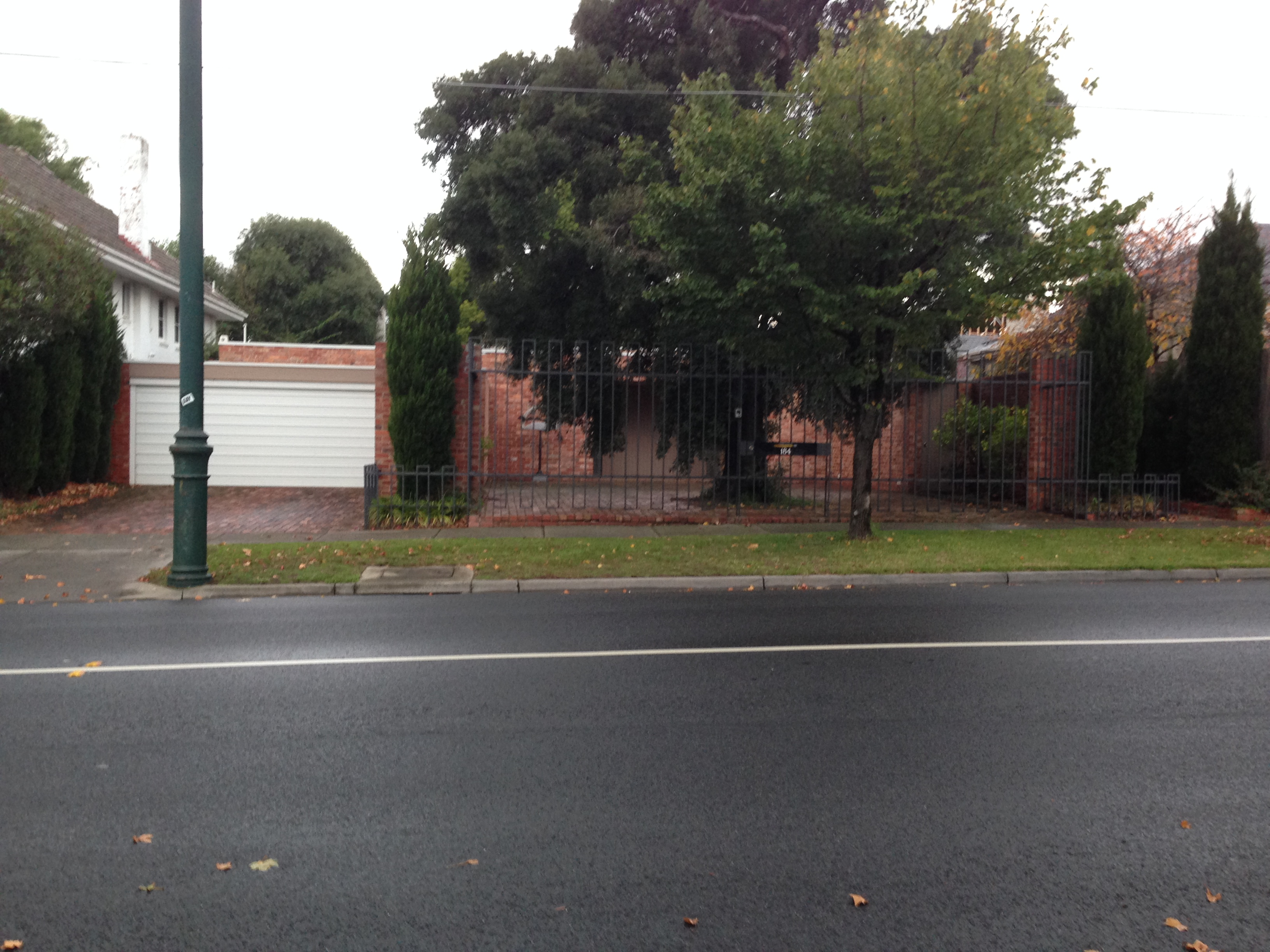
Hallows House, Toorak, 1974; alterations were made in 1986

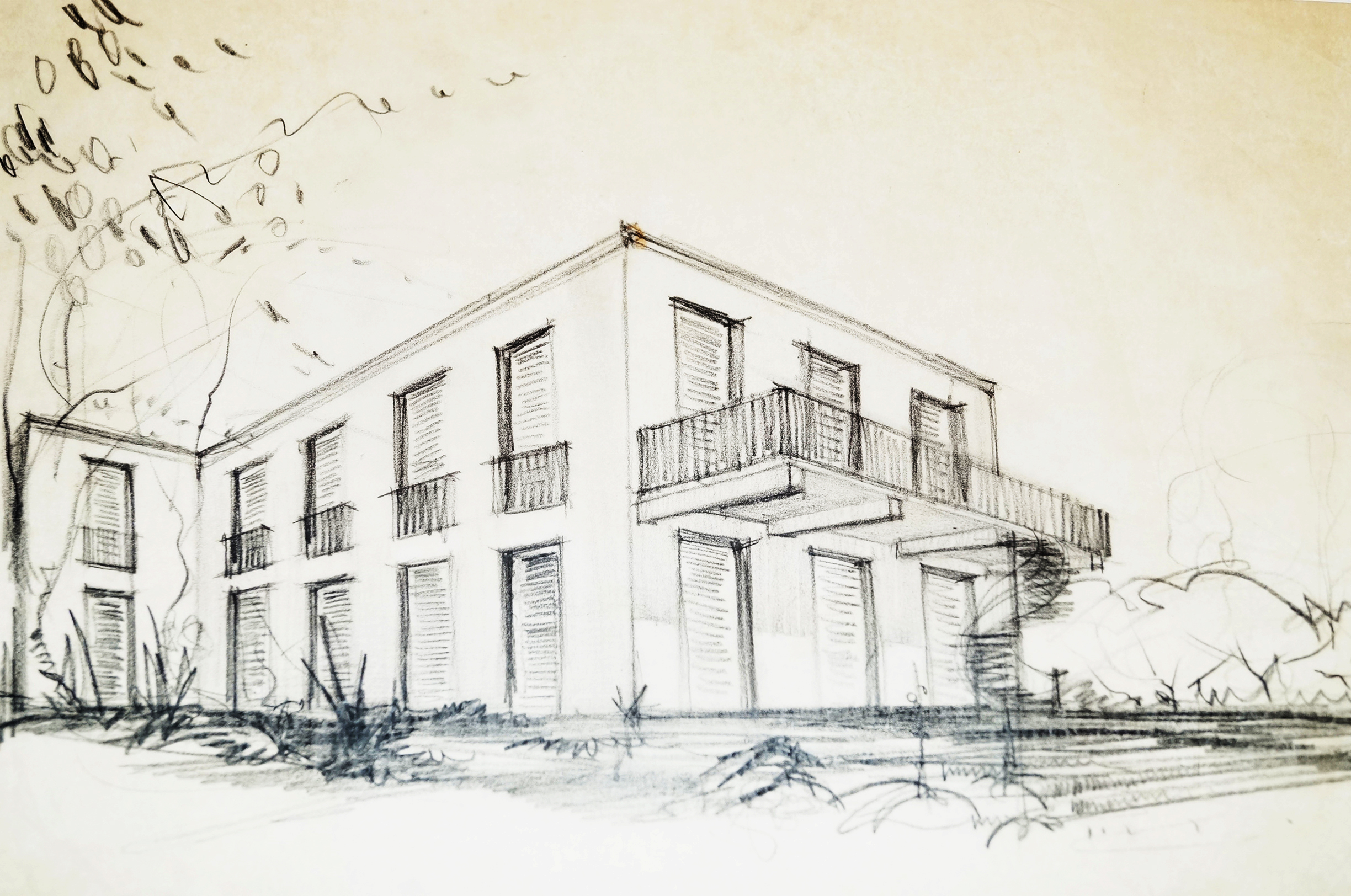
McGrath House, Bellevue Hill; perspective view by Bell, 1969

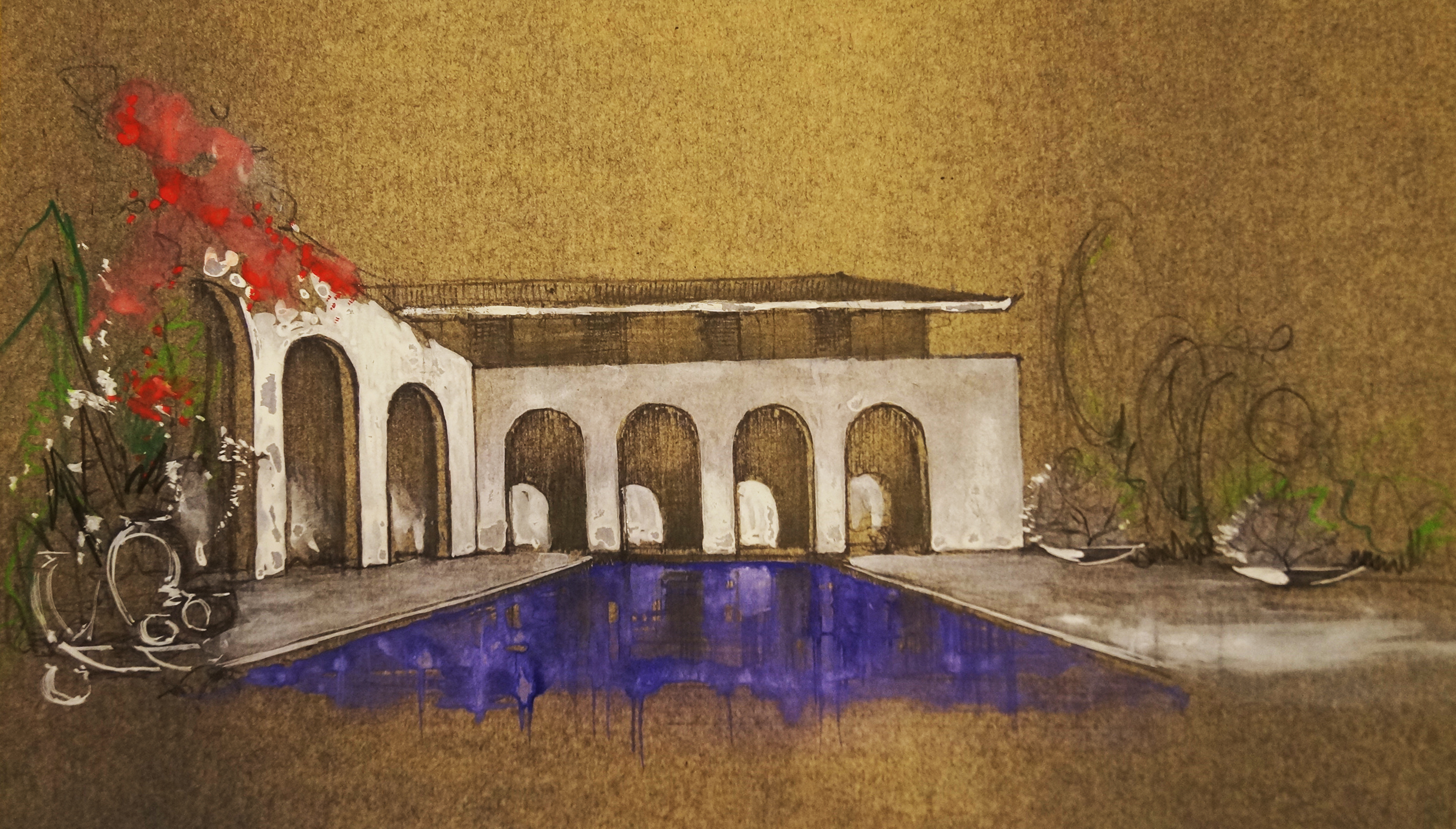
McFarlane arch representation; coloured render showing pool & aesthetic of building, 1971

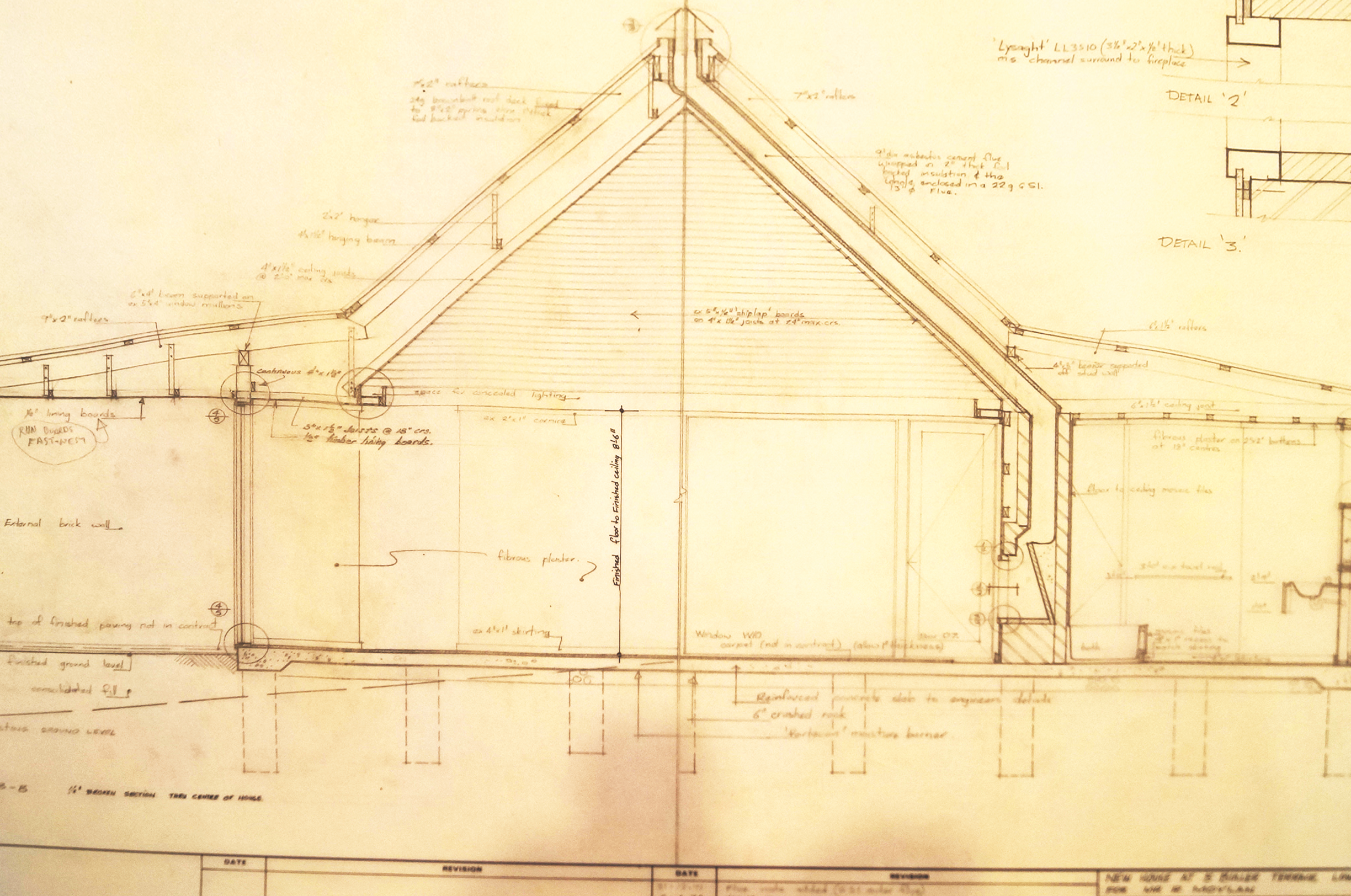
Moylan House, showing details of the chimney design, 1973

== See also ==
- List of Australian architects
