= Neil Clerehan =

Australian architect (1922-2017)

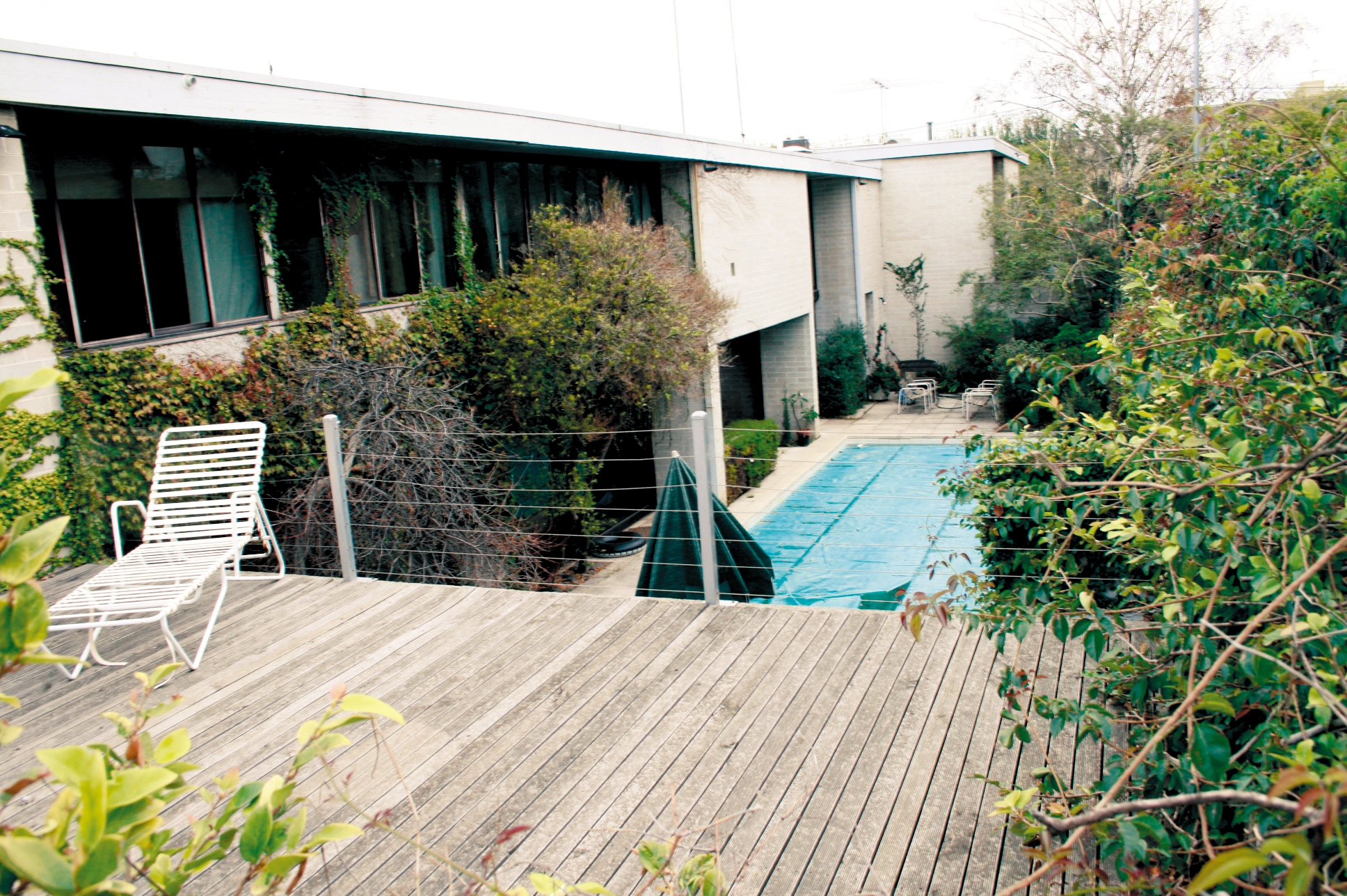
- Born: 29 December 1922; Brighton, Melbourne, Victoria, Australia
- Died: 18 November 2017 (aged 94); Epworth Hospital, Richmond, Melbourne
- Citizenship: Australia
- Education: St Patrick's College, Melbourne Technical College, University of Melbourne
- Occupations: Architect, writer
- Years active: 1950—2016
- Spouse: Sonia Cole (1955—2017)
- Children: Andrew, Victoria, Esther, David
- Parent(s): Rody Clerehan, Adelaide Gibbons
- Awards: Victorian Architecture Medal, 1964 & 1967
- Practice: Bell Clerehan Partnership (1962—1964), Clerehan Cran (1980—1996)
- Buildings: Beddison Swift House 1963, Simon House 1964, Fenner House 1967
- Projects: Pettit & Sevitt project homes
- Design: RVIA Small Homes Service (1950—1951, 1954–1961)

Neil Clerehan (29 December 1922 – 10 November 2017) was an Australian architect and architectural writer.

== Early life and training ==
Neil Clerehan was born in the Melbourne suburb of Brighton on 29 December 1922. He developed an interest in architecture at an early age, encouraged by his parents who bought him a subscription to Australian Home Beautiful as his eleventh birthday present.

Matriculating from St Patrick's College, East Melbourne and enrolled in 1940 in the architecture program at the Melbourne Technical College. After a stint in the army, where he met Robin Boyd, he resumed his studies at RMIT University in 1945, transferring in 1946 to the night-class Atelier course at University of Melbourne. For most of 1946, he also worked in the office of Martin & Tribe. He then transferred to the new Bachelor of Architecture at University of Melbourne, graduating in 1950, having already registered as an architect in 1949.

== Early works ==
In 1946 he took over the editorship of Smudges, the monthly news sheet of the Architectural Students Society of the RVIA, from Robin Boyd, carrying on the championing of modern design. In 1947 he assisted Boyd with the seminal publication Victorian Modern, and the establishment of The Age's Small Homes Service, which provided low cost modern house designs, promoted through the newspaper.

Clerehan helped provide house designs from the beginning, and ran the service in 1950 and 1951 while Boyd was overseas. In 1949 he designed his first built project, a simple skillion roofed north facing house for a Brighton neighbour. He returned in early 1953, and took over directorship of the Small Homes Service from Boyd again, and restarted his solo architectural practice.

== Personal life ==
He married Sonia Cole in 1955, their first home for a few months being a flat in Regents Court on Toorak Road, before moving to the glass-walled house he designed for his family in Fawkner Street, South Yarra.

== Architecture ==
Clerehan described his style as that of 'an unreconstructed Modernist'. In 2010 he wrote that "architecture is a system rather than a style. I don't have a social conscience on the question of sustainability. I regard our building habits, especially of housing, as the antithesis of environmental empathy."

== Writing and Public Life ==
Clerehan wrote and published continuously, championing good, modern design, through editorials and articles, starting with his editorship of Smudges in the 1940s, he went on to publish weekly columns in The Age as part of the Small Homes Service through the 1950s. In 1961, Clerehan assembled and edited Best Australian Houses 1961 for the RAIA, to promote the work of Institute members, "an astute summary of the leap Australian architecture had made in the 1950s."

In 1970, Clerehan provided a broad overview on Australian architecture in Australia, New Zealand and the South Pacific. In 1971, following Boyd's death, he put together a special edition of the RAIA's journal Architect. Through the 1970s he was the local contributor to the United States journal Architecture Plus. He took an active interest in the new discipline of heritage in the 1970s, joining the Buildings Committee of the National Trust of Australia (Victoria), and served as chairman then president of the Council for the Historic Environment (1977–84). In the 1980s and 1990s, he was a member of the State Government's Historic Buildings Preservation Council. He also sat on bodies such as the Visual Arts Board of the Australia Council and the Commission of Advanced Education.

Harriet Edquist and Richard Black paid tribute to his architectural work and writings in the book The architecture of Neil Clerehan (2010).

== Notable works ==
Clerehan's first house for his family, built in 1955, was a simple two storey flat roofed brick walled structure with the north face being entirely a then typical 1950s timber framed window wall. Unusually however, this was on an inner city block of Victorian villas, and stood out with its tall all-glass front set well back behind a tall brick fence. The front garden functioned as the main outdoor space, and the living rooms were on the first floor.

While director of the Small Homes Service between 1953 and 1961, as contributions from other architects dropped off, he designed many houses himself, approximately 130. They ranged widely from simple, rectangular, flat roofed modernist styles, to the more typically suburban low pitched gable roof L shape plan. It is not known how many of these were ultimately built, but the service sold hundreds of his plans during his tenure, and examples can be found throughout Melbourne's huge suburban areas developed in the 1950s and 1960s.

From 1962 to 1964 he was briefly in partnership with Guilford Bell, another notable practitioner of postwar modernist domestic design, and their first and major commission was the Simon House, a large single level beach house in bayside Mt Eliza. The house has a square symmetrical plan, a Bell signature, arranged around a large courtyard containing a pool. The expansive living area has full height windows both to the bay on one side, and courtyard on the other. It won the RVIA Single House Victorian Architecture Medal in 1964. Another house completed through the same partnership was the 1963 Beddison Swift House built in Ivanhoe.

In 1968, with a growing family, Clerehan designed a second house for himself, in Walsh Street, South Yarra, around the corner from the Fenner House, and on the same street as Boyd's 1958 family home. As described by architectural academic Prof Philip Goad, "This is typical Clerehan: understated, self-effacing and underestimating his own consummate skill in being able to provide an elegant backdrop to everyday life." It remained his family home until his death in 2017.

In the late 1960s, his efficiency in house planning led to a commission from Pettit & Sevitt, a Sydney-based project home builder. Pettit & Sevitt offered a wide range of plans to suit various sites and budgets in Sydney, Melbourne and Canberra, designed by noted architects such as Ken Woolley of Ancher Mortlock Murray & Wooley and Harry Seidler, all with a similar aesthetic of white board or bagged brick walls, flat or cathedral ceilings with exposed beams, and open plan living spaces with generous walls of glass opening onto decks and gardens.

In 1969, in association with Ancher Mortlock Murray & Woolley, Clerehan designed the 3136 (a very efficiently planned small flat roofed three bedroom house, named for its 11 square size of 31x36 feet), which won the Project Home Award from the New South Wales chapter of the RAIA in both 1970 and 1971. The house was popular, reportedly selling three per week for a year, mostly in Sydney. In 1972, again with Ancher Mortlock Murray & Woolley, he designed an even smaller house, the 2937 (29 x 37 feet), which received the 1973 NSW Project Home Award.

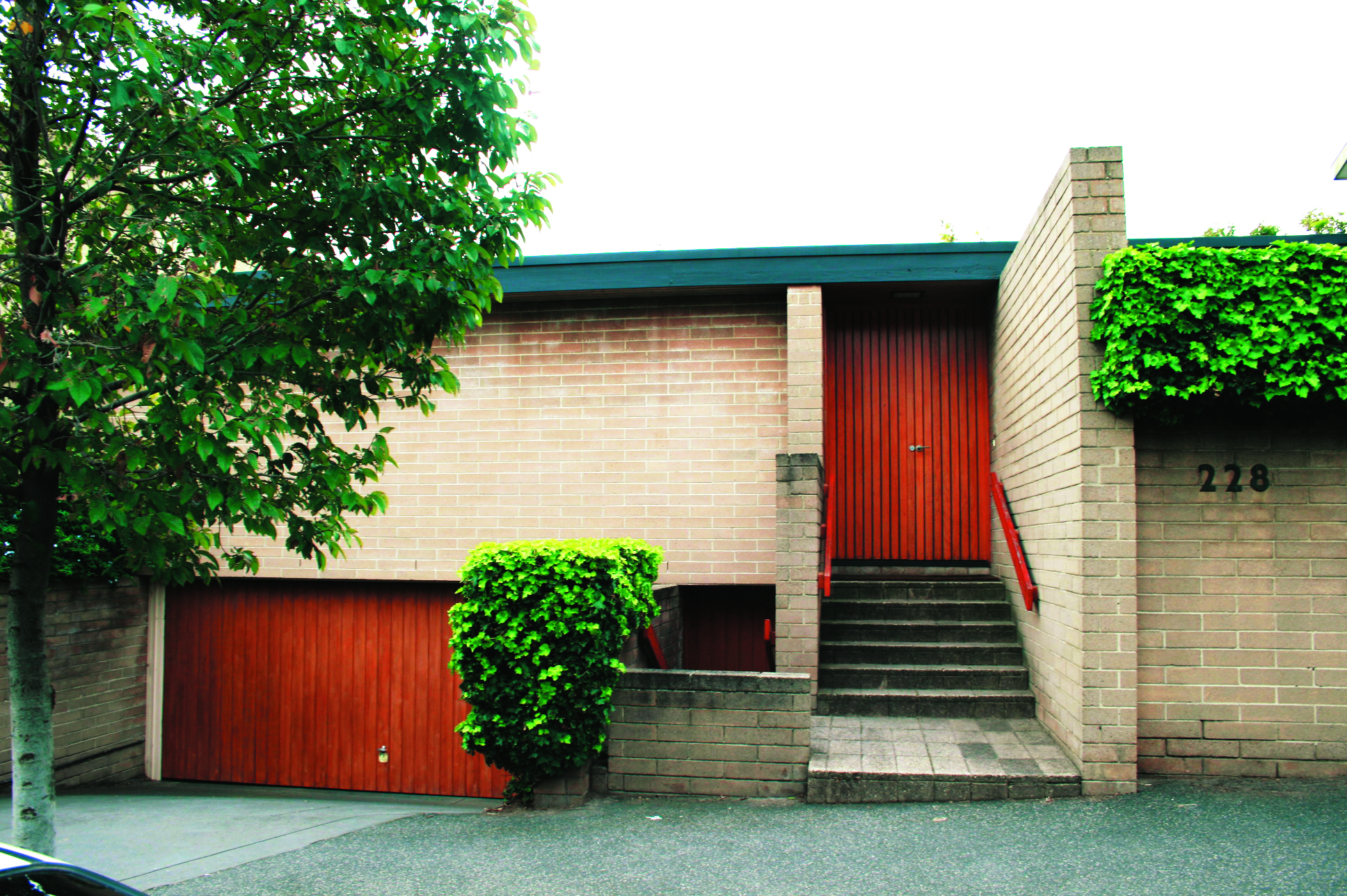
Fenner House, 1964, street facade

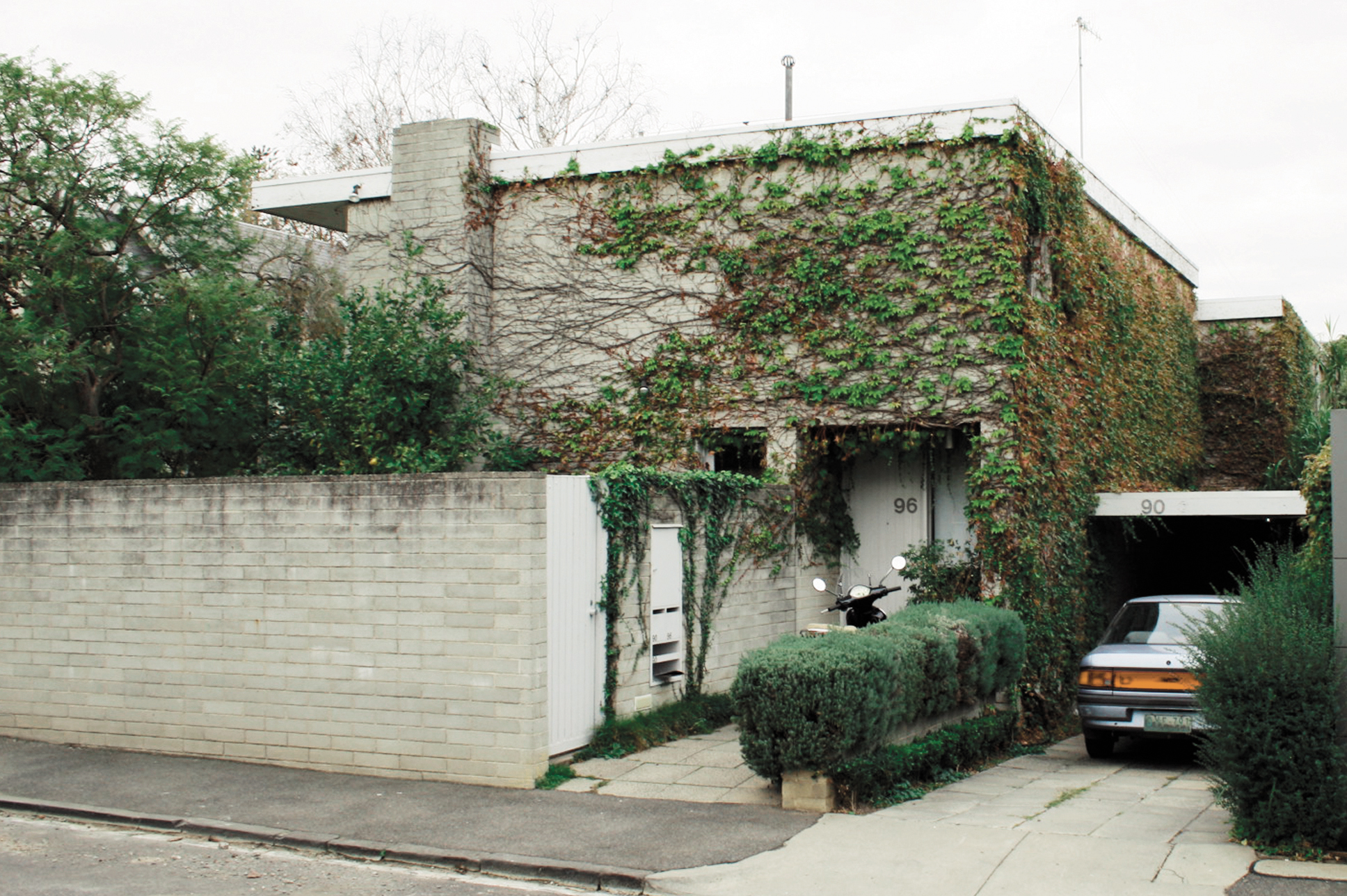
Clerehan House II, 1968, street facade

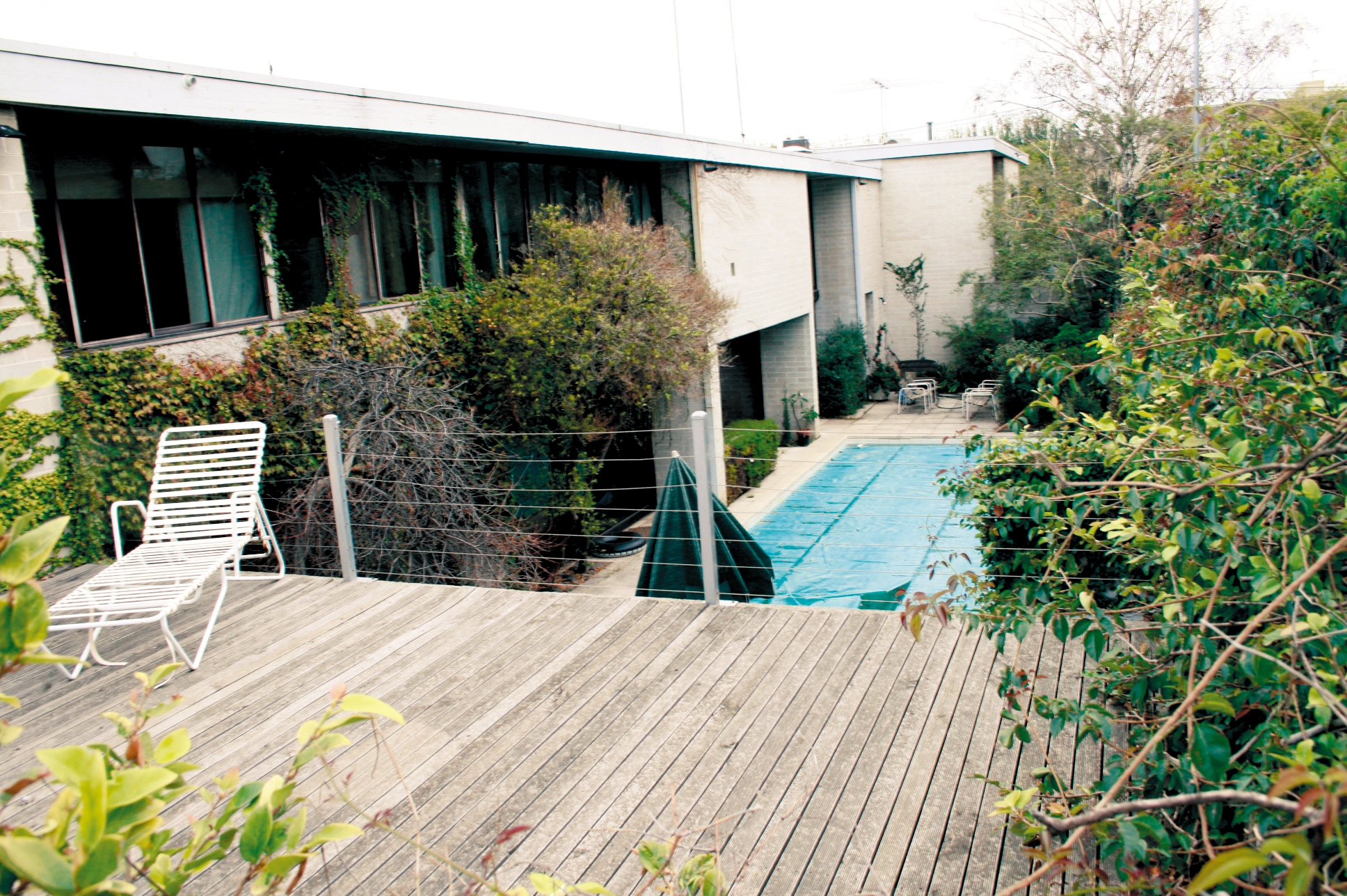
Clerehan House II, 1968, courtyard

== Later life ==
Through the 1980s, 1990s and 2000s, Clerehan maintained an active practice, concentrating on houses. From 1980 onward he was in partnership with David Cran as Clerehan Cran until Cran's death in 1996, when he resumed solo practice, continuing to work into his 90s. He continued to write, including obituaries of his contemporaries as he outlived them. In 2006, his work and life was the subject of the RMIT publication The Architecture of Neil Clerehan. By 2011, he was described as a 'living treasure'. Neil Clerehan died in November 2017, aged 94.

== Awards ==
- 1964 RVIA Victorian Architecture Medal, Single House Medal and Diploma for the Simon House (with Guilford Bell)
- 1967 RVIA Victorian Architecture Medal, Single House Medal and Diploma for the Fenner House
- 1970 RAIA NSW Chapter Project House Design Award for 'under $12,000' for the Pettit & Sevitt 3136 House (in association with Ancher Mortlock Murray & Woolley)
- 1971 Two RAIA NSW Chapter Project House Design Awards for the Pettit & Sevitt 3136 House (in association with Ancher Mortlock Murray & Woolley); one for the basic H design, for houses 'under $10,000', and another for the 3H variation, for houses between $10–13,000.
- 1973 RAIA NSW Chapter Project House Design Award for the Pettit & Sevitt 2937 House (in association with Ancher Mortlock Murray & Woolley)
- 1973 RAIA (Victorian Chapter) Award of Merit, Clerehan House II
- 1977 Victorian Life Fellow of the Australian Institute of Architects
- 2004 RAIA (Victorian Chapter) President's Award for the Hall of Fame
- 2005 RAIA (Victorian Chapter), Victorian Architecture Award
- 2009 Honorary Doctorate, Faculty of Architecture, University of Melbourne
