= David Surrey Littlemore =

David Surrey Littlemore AO
- Born: David Surrey Gibson Littlemore; 24 June 1910; Bundaberg, Queensland, Australia
- Died: 10 September 1989 (aged 79); Longueville, New South Wales, Australia
- Education: The Scots College
- Occupation: Architect
- Notable work: Qantas House, Sydney Opera House interiors
- Spouse: Sylvia Nora Lidwill (m.1936) Agnes Mould Curry (m.1942–89; his death)
- Relatives: Sons; David Lidwill Littlemore (1936—2022); Stuart Littlemore
- Awards: Office of Order of Australia

David Surrey Gibson Littlemore AO (24 June 1910 – 10 September 1989) was one of Australia's most distinguished architects. Littlemore was one of the first life fellows of the Royal Australian Institute of Architects. He was head of construction supervision in the consortium Hall Todd & Littlemore appointed by the NSW Government Architect to complete the Sydney Opera House in April 1966 when Mr Jørn Utzon resigned his commission from the NSW Government. Peter Hall was design architect and Lionel Todd was responsible for contract documentation.

== Career ==
Littlemore's career began with the design of a sugar mill in his home town of Bundaberg when he was 14, followed by study and design work with Sydney architect Mr Emil Sodersten.

He became a partner in Rudder, Littlemore, and Rudder, which won a Royal Institute of British Architects' Bronze Medal for the Qantas Building located at 1 Chifley Square in Sydney's CBD. "Qantas House" was added to the New South Wales Government State Heritage Register.

== Improvisation and design skills ==
Littlemore was known for his ability to improvise solutions and to resolve complex design problems. In New Guinea in the 1950s he built aircraft maintenance hangars by stringing cables between trees and suspending roofs from them.

== Design and construction of the Sydney Opera House ==
Littlemore was in charge of construction in the Hall Todd & Littlemore consortium that was responsible for the design and construction of Stage 3 of the Sydney Opera House from 1966 until the building was completed in 1973.

== Later years ==
Littlemore served for 10 years on the Council of Macquarie University and was made an officer of the Order of Australia in 1979 for services to architecture. He died in Longueville in Sydney's north shore in 1989.
