= Lloyd Rees Award for Urban Design =

Australian urban design award

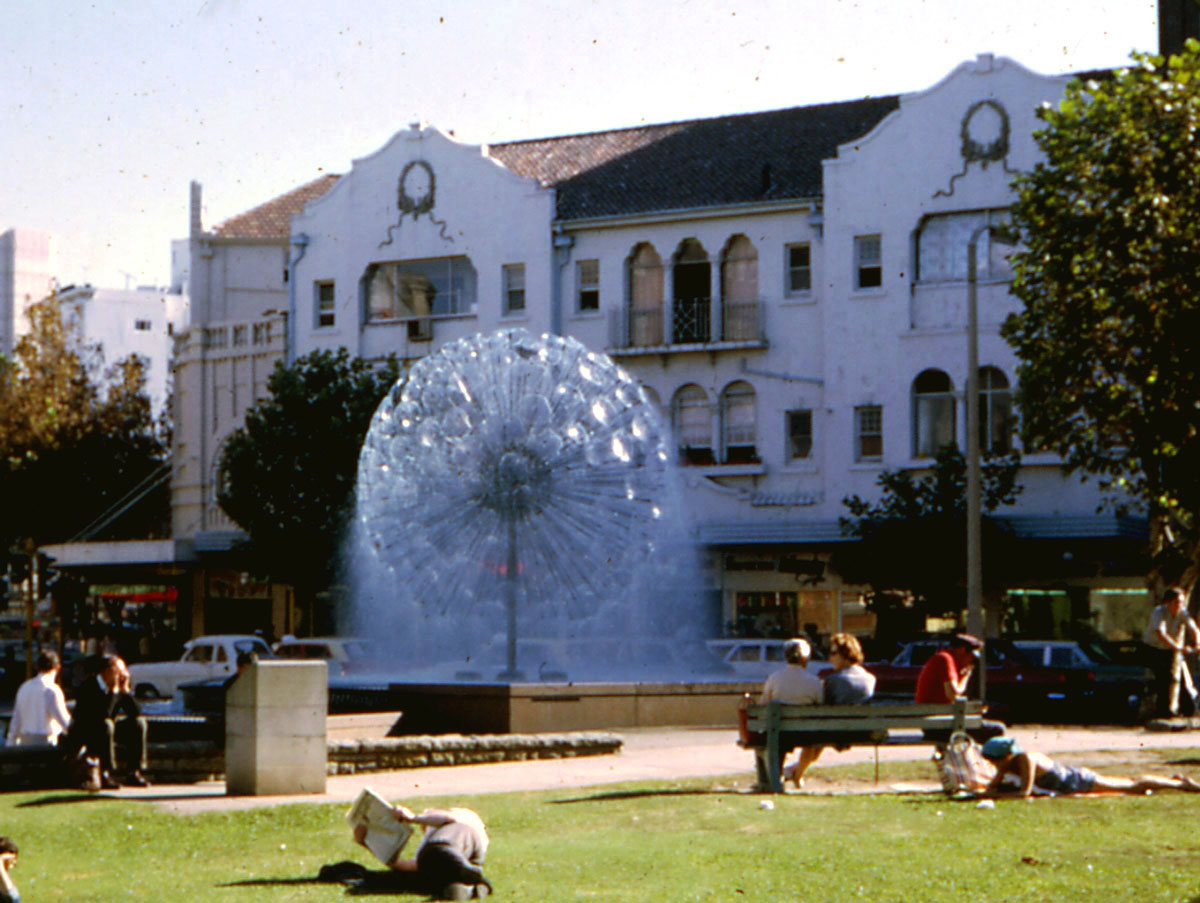
- Inaugural Civic Design Award winner, El Alamein Fountain, 1964
- Awarded for: Urban Design in New South Wales
- Country: Australia
- Presented by: Australian Institute of Architects (NSW Chapter)
- First award: 1964; 62 years ago
- Currently held by: Cox Architecture for Parramatta Light Rail, 2026
- Website: www.architecture.com.au/awards

The Lloyd Rees Award for Urban Design is the annual named award for excellence in urban design in New South Wales, Australia as determined by jury appointed by the Australian Institute of Architects (AIA), New South Wales Chapter.

== Background ==
=== Definition of the award ===
According to the AIA Policy 13: Awards, Prizes and Honours, projects in this category may be 'single structures, groups of structures or non-building projects, studies or masterplans, which are of public, civic or urban design in nature. Awarded projects must have enhanced the quality of the built environment or public domain or contribute to the wellbeing of the broader community.'

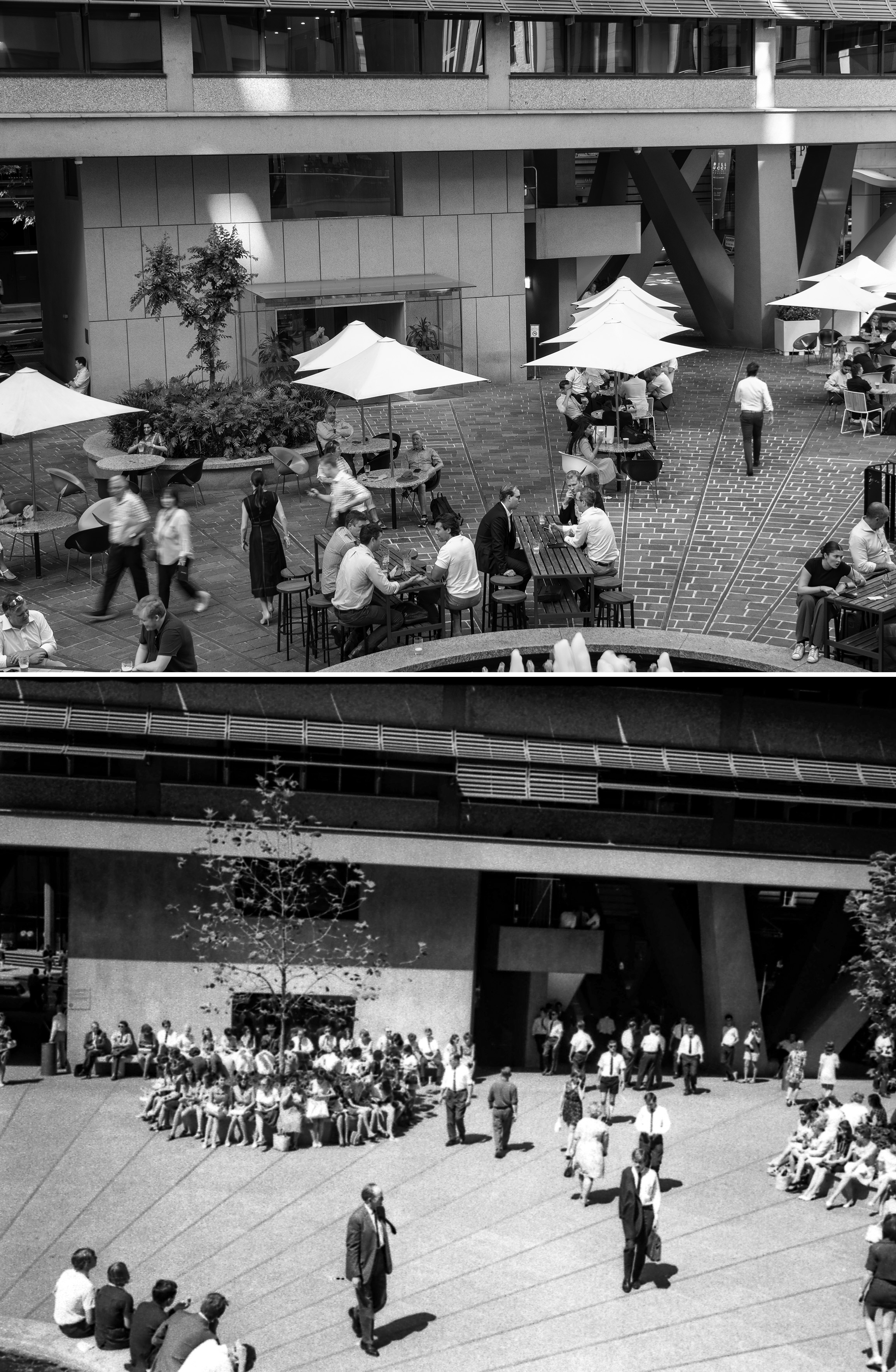
Australia Square, Sydney by Seidler & Associates, 1967 Civic Design Award winner

=== Early awards for civic design in NSW ===
A NSW based award for civic design was first established in 1964. Robert Woodward of architectural practice Woodward, Tarantino and Wallace was presented with the inaugural award for the El Alamein Fountain in Fitzroy Gardens, Kings Cross. The 1964 award was established to recognise an architectural project that was outside the traditional architecture award categories such as the Sir John Sulman Medal. Three years later in 1967 Harry Seidler was presented with an RAIA Civic Design Award for Australia Square recognising the integration of accessible public space in a private development.In 1980 Jørn Utzon was presented with a RAIA Civic Design Award for the Sydney Opera House.

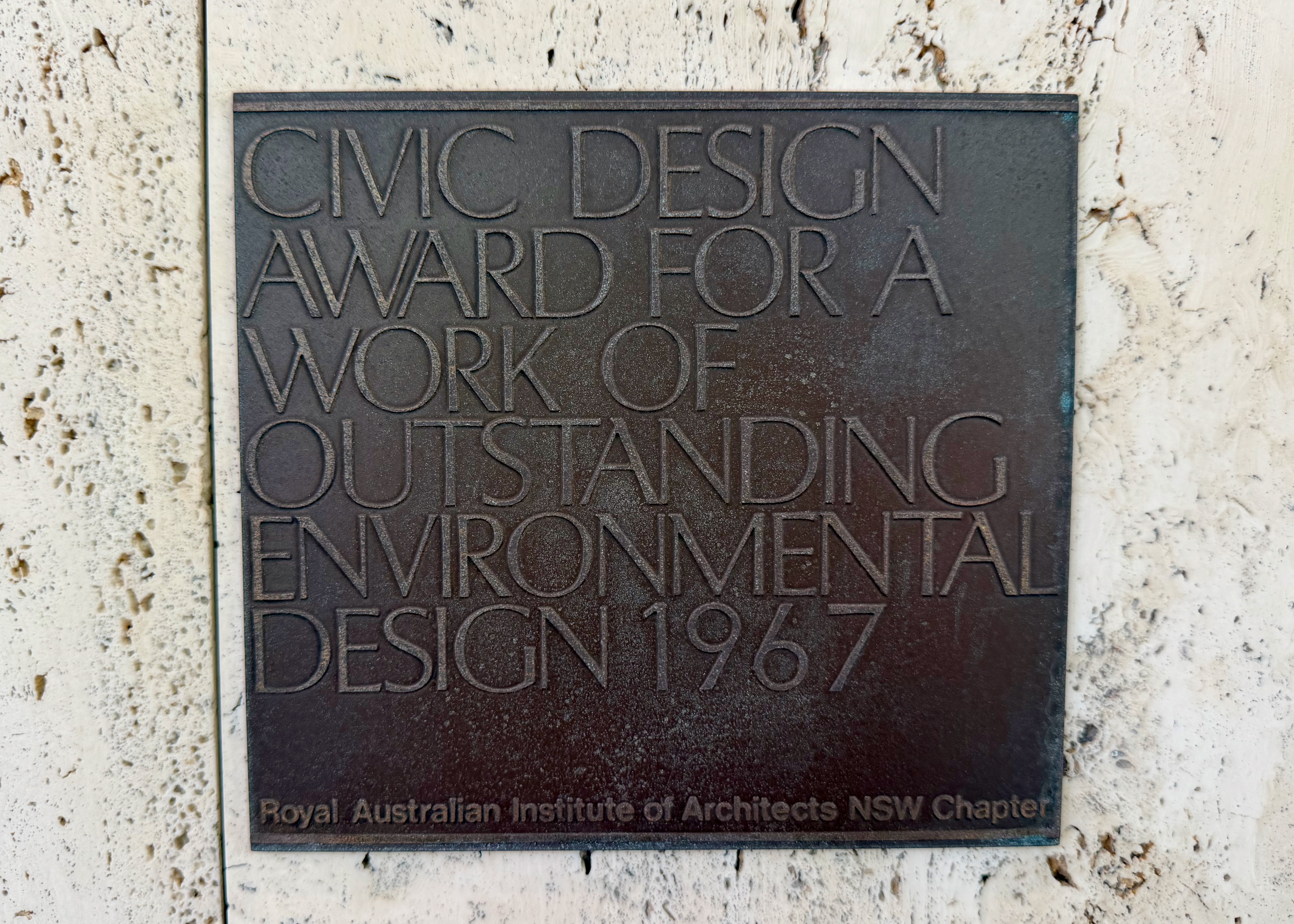
1967 Civic Design Award bronze plaque, Australia Square, Sydney

=== Change from civic design to urban design ===
The award was initially established as the Lloyd Rees Award for Civic Design in 1979 and given annually until 2002. The award category was modified to urban design in 2003 to better reflect changes in the architectural profession and the rise of urban design as the more common terminology for architectural projects of larger scale and community or public benefit.

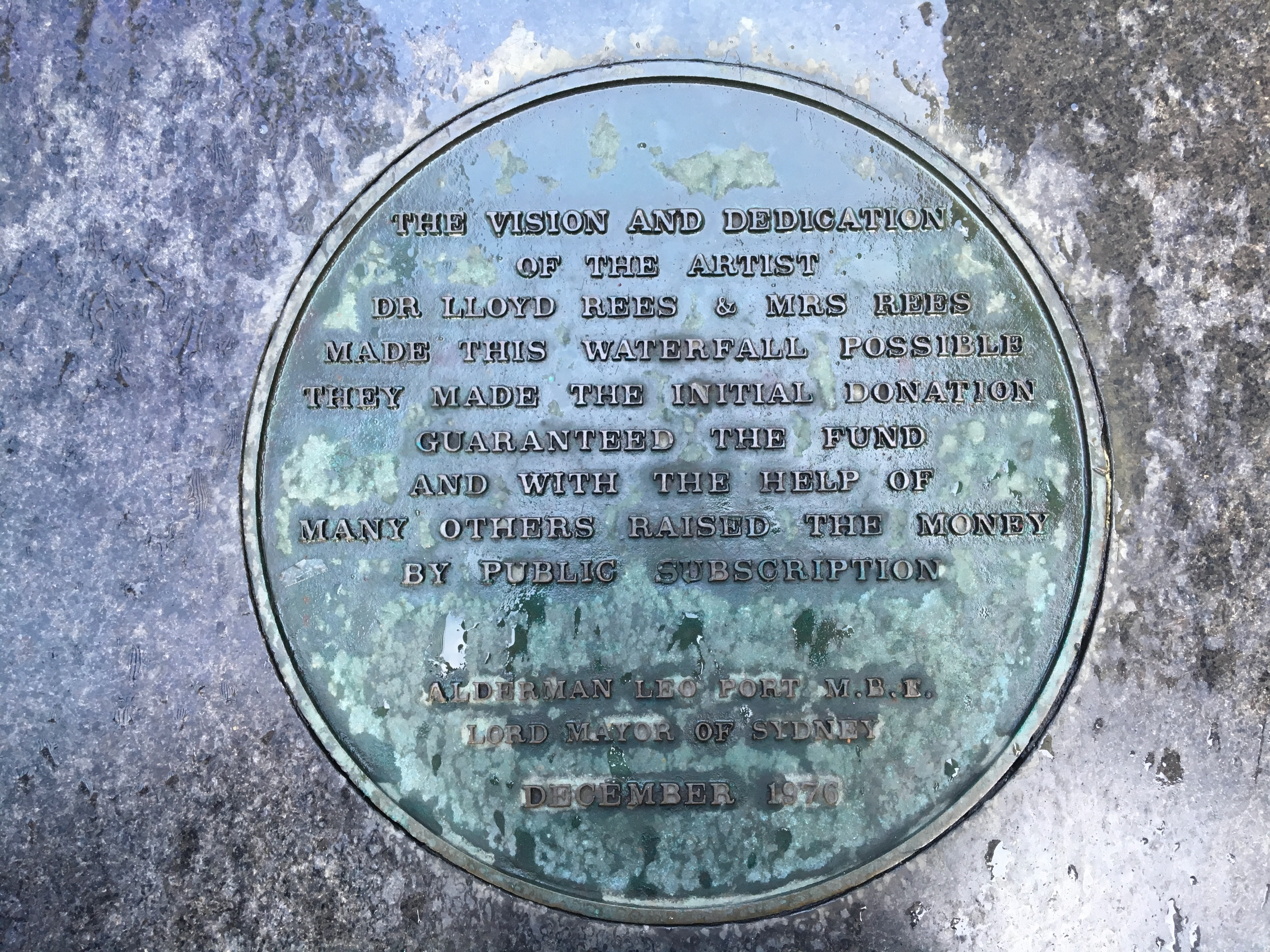
Lloyd Rees Fountain plaque, Martin Place, December 1976

=== Other civic design awards and recognition ===
In 1959 the Civic Trust Awards were established in the United Kingdom as an awards system to recognise outstanding planning, urban design and architecture. In 1967 the Civic Trust of South Australia was established, based on the UK Civic Trust Awards and independent of the Australian Institute of Architects, with its own civic awards presented annually.

=== Naming of the award ===
The award was named in 1979 after Australian born artist and architectural educator Lloyd Rees AC CMG (1895–1988). Lloyd Rees was a famous landscape painter and an influential figure in architecture and civic design. For decades he taught in the School of Architecture at the University of Sydney, and was a member of the City of Sydney Fountains Committee (established 1957–1968) from 1962 to 1967. The Lloyd Rees Fountain in Martin Place was sited and funded by Rees himself and opened in 1976. He is known for his quote 'a city is the greatest work of art possible', which is inscribed on his cast bronze bust at Sydney Town Hall, and also 'what else is a city but a gallery of beautiful buildings?'.

== Recipients of Lloyd Rees Award for Urban Design ==
Winners of Lloyd Rees Award for Urban Design by year
Year	Architect	Project	Location	State	Type	Other AIA awards
2026	Cox Architecture	Parramatta Light Rail (Stage 1, Westmead to Carlingford)	Parramatta	New South Wales	Transport	
2025	Sydney Metro (Transport for NSW)	Sydney Metro City: City Line Stations(Sydenham, Waterloo, Central, Gadigal, Martin Place, Barangaroo, Victoria Cross, Crows Nest)	Sydney	New South Wales	Transport	NSW Architecture Medallion, 2025; Walter Burley Griffin Award for Urban Design, 2025
2024	Cox Architecture and Aspect Studios	Sydney Football Stadium	Moore Park, Sydney	New South Wales	Recreation	Commendation for Public Architecture, 2024
2023	No Named Award					Two commendations: City of Sydney Street Furniture; Opera Residences, Circular Quay
2022	SJB	Newcastle East End	Hunter Street, Newcastle CBD	New South Wales	Mixed Use	Awards to full team of SJB, Durbach Block Jaggers and Tonkin Zulaikha Greer: Award for Residential Architecture, Multiple Housing, 2022; Premier's Prize, 2022
2021	Lahznimmo Architects and Aspect Studios	Sub Base Platypus (Stage 1)	120 High Street, North Sydney	New South Wales	Heritage	Walter Burley Griffin Award for Urban Design, 2021
2020	Hassell in collaboration with Turpin Crawford Studio and McGregor Westlake Architecture	Sydney Metro Northwest	Sydney	New South Wales	Transport	Walter Burley Griffin Award for Urban Design, 2020; Commendation for Public Architecture, 2020 (NSW)
2019	Mirvac Design, NSW Government Architect's Office, City of Sydney, PTW	Harold Park Development	Wigram Road, Glebe	New South Wales	Residential	City of Sydney Lord Mayor's Prize, 2019
2018	Hassell and Populous	Darling Harbour Renewal	Darling Harbour	New South Wales	Cultural	Walter Burley Griffin Award for Urban Design, 2018
2017	Tzannes and Cox Richardson and Foster and Partners	Central Park, Sydney	Broadway, Chippendale	New South Wales	Mixed Use	
2016	JPW and TKD Architects in collaboration	5 Martin Place	Martin Place, Sydney	New South Wales	Commercial	
2015	NSW Government Architect's Office with McGregor Westlake	Wollongong City Centre and Crown Street Mall Renewal	Crown Street, Wollongong	New South Wales	Public Space	
2014	Neeson Murcutt Architects in Association with City of Sydney	Prince Alfred Park and Pool Upgrade	Prince Alfred Park, Surry Hills	New South Wales	Recreation	Walter Burley Griffin Award for Urban Design, 2014; National Award for Public Architecture, 2014; Sir John Sulman Medal, 2014 (NSW); City of Sydney Lord Mayor's Prize, 2014 (NSW)
2013	FJMT and Aspect Studios	Darling Quarter	Darling Harbour	New South Wales	Mixed Use	
2012	BVN Architecture	Taronga Zoo Upper Entry Precinct	Mosman	New South Wales	Public Space	
2011	Tonkin Zulaikha Greer	National Centre of Indigenous Excellence	166-180 George Street, Redfern	New South Wales	Cultural	
2010	Tonkin Zulaikha Greer with JMD Design & the City of Sydney	Paddington Reservoir Gardens	255a Oxford Street, Paddington	New South Wales	Public Space	Greenway Award for Heritage, 2010 (NSW)
2009	Merivale Group, Woods Bagot and Hecker Phelan Guthrie	Ivy Precinct	George Street, Sydney	New South Wales	Commercial	Harry Seidler Award for Commercial Architecture, 2009 (National); National Award for Urban Design, 2009; Commercial Architecture Award, 2009 (NSW)
2008	Rice Daubney, Allen Jack and Cottier and Group GSA in association with Civitas Urban Design and Planning	Rouse Hill Town Centre	Main Street, Rouse Hill	New South Wales	Town Centre	Walter Burley Griffin Award for Urban Design, 2008
2007	Johnson Pilton Walker	Westpac Place	Kent Street, Sydney	New South Wales	Commercial	
2006	Durbach Block Architects	Brickpit Ring	Sydney Olympic Park	New South Wales	Public Space	
2005	HPA, PTW, Tropman and Tropman, Bates Smart, Clive Lucas Stapleton and Partners	Walsh Bay Redevelopment	Hickson Road, Millers Point	NSW	Mixed Use	Walter Burley Griffin Award for Urban Design, 2005
2004	No Named Award					
2003	New South Wales Government Architect in association with Hassell and Turpin and Crawford Studio	Victoria Park	Zetland	New South Wales	Public Space	
2002	Sydney Harbour Foreshore Authority in association with New South Wales Government Architect, Department of Public Works & Service	Dawes Point Park	Dawes Point, The Rocks	New South Wales	Public Space	
2000	FJMT	John Niland Scientia Building and Red Centre, UNSW	Kensington	New South Wales	Education	Sir Zelman Cowen Award for Public Architecture, 2000; Sir John Sulman Medal, 2000 (NSW)
1999	Lippmann Associates	King George V Recreation Centre	Cumberland Street, The Rocks	New South Wales	Recreation	
1998	Sydney Cove Authority	Long's Lane Precinct Stage 3 conservation	The Rocks, Sydney	New South Wales	Heritage	
1997	New South Wales Government Architect (Chris Johnson) with design architect Eric Wisden	Sydney Hospital and Sydney Eye Hospital redevelopment	Macquarie Street, Sydney	New South Wales	Heritage	
1997	Tonkin Zuliakha	Overseas Passenger Terminal	The Rocks, Sydney	New South Wales	Transport	
1996						
1995	Denton Corker Marshall	Museum of Sydney	Bridge Street, Sydney	New South Wales	Cultural	
1994	Tonkin Zulaikha Harford Architects (joint winner)	The Rocks Square	The Rocks, Sydney	New South Wales	Public Building	Walter Burley Griffin Award for Urban Design, 1994; Merit Award for Urban Design, 1994 (NSW)
1994	PTW	UNSW Quadrangle Building	Kensington	New South Wales	Education	Merit Award for Urban Design, 1994 (NSW); Merit Award for Architecture, 1994 (NSW)
1993						
1992						
1991	Robert Woodward	Water Feature at Darling Harbour ′Tidal Cascade′	Darling Harbour, Sydney	New South Wales	Public Fountain	Walter Burley Griffin Award for Urban Design, 1991; AILA National Civic Design Award, (NSW)
1990						
1989						
1988	NSW Public Works Department, Architectural Division with Allen Jack and Cottier, Conybeare Morrison and Partners, Hall Bowe and Webber, and Lawrence Nield and Partners	Circular Quay Redevelopment and Macquarie Street Redevelopment for the Australian Bicentenary	Macquarie Street, Sydney	New South Wales	Public Space	National Award for Civic Design, 1988
1988	NSW Public Works Architectural Division JW Thomson, NSW Government Architect Health Building Branch CW Johnson, Principal Architect: Hugh Spence	Sydney Hospital (Macquarie Street Facade)	Macquarie Street, Sydney	New South Wales	Health	
1988	Conybeare Morrison & Partners	Street Furniture	Macquarie Street, Sydney	New South Wales	Urban Design	
1987						
1986						
1985	Vivian Fraser in Association with NSW Government Architect (Ian Thomson)	Wharf Theatre	Hickson Road, Walsh Bay	New South Wales	Cultural	National Award for Enduring Architecture, 2008; President's Award for Recycled Buildings, 1985 (National Awards)
1984						
1983						
1982						
1981	Harry Seidler	MLC Centre	25 Martin Place, Sydney	New South Wales	Commercial	Sir John Sulman Medal, 1983
1980	Jørn Utzon	Sydney Opera House		New South Wales	Cultural	National Award for Enduring Architecture, 2023; NSW Enduring Architecture Award, 2003; RAIA Merit Award, 1974; RAIA Commemorative Award, Jørn Utzon – Sydney Opera House, 1992
1978	Ancher Mortlock and Woolley and Noel Bell-Ridley Smith	Sydney Square (other than St Andrew's House, Town Hall House and Town Hall)	Town Hall, Sydney	New South Wales	Public Space	Merit Award for a Work of Outstanding Environmental Design, (Category C), NSW Design Excellence Awards, 1978
1967	Harry Seidler	Australia Square	264 George Street, Sydney	New South Wales	Commercial	National Award for Enduring Architecture, 2012; New South Wales Enduring Architecture Award, 2012; Sir John Sulman Medal, 1967; Original award description RAIA Civic Design Award for a work of outstanding environmental design, 1967
1964	Woodward, Tarantino and Wallace (Robert Woodward)	El Alamein Fountain	Fitzroy Gardens, Macleay Street, Kings Cross	New South Wales	Public Fountain	RAIA Civic Design Award, 1964

== Gallery of award winners ==
Lloyd Rees Award for Urban Design
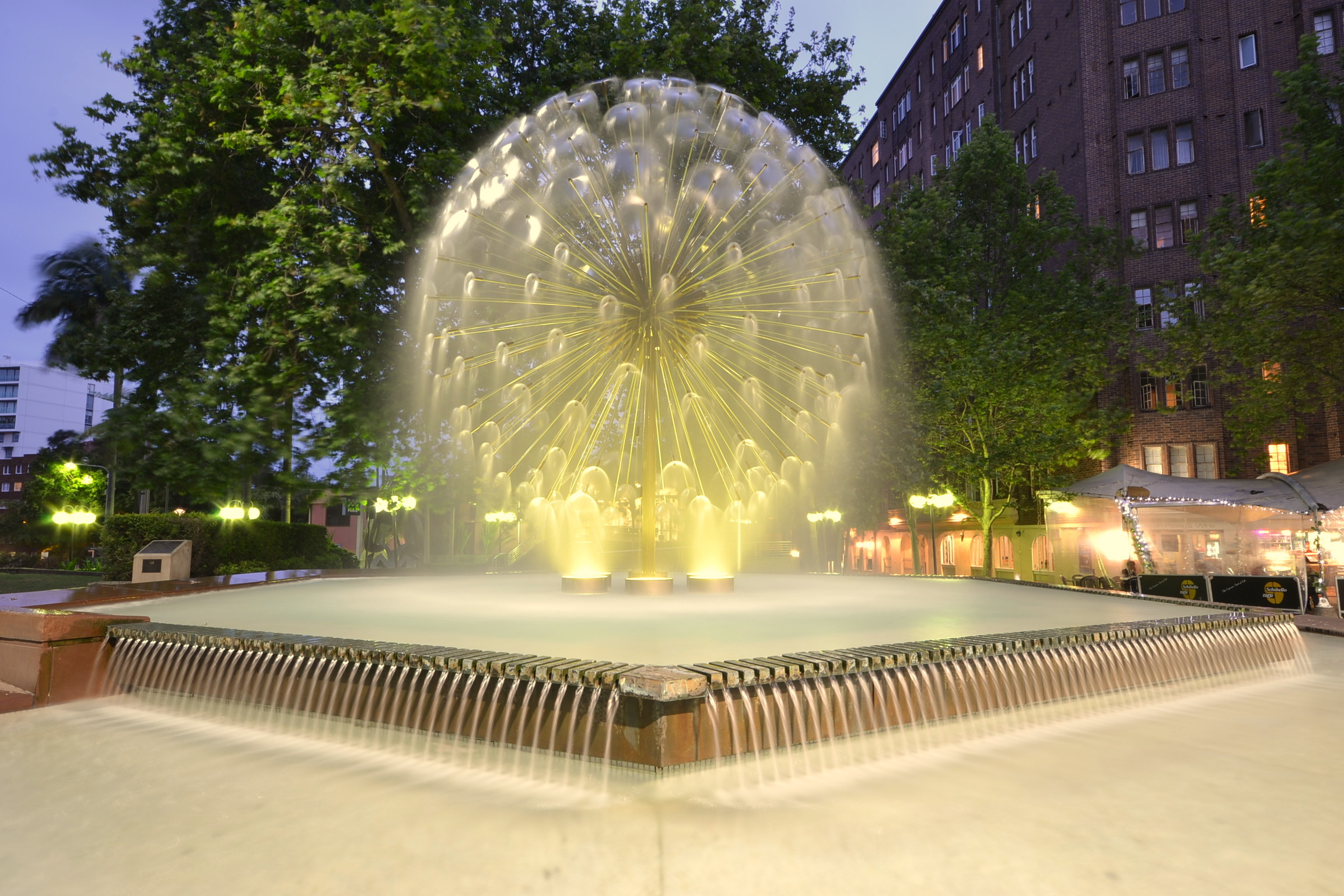
1964 Award, El Alamein Fountain, Kings Cross

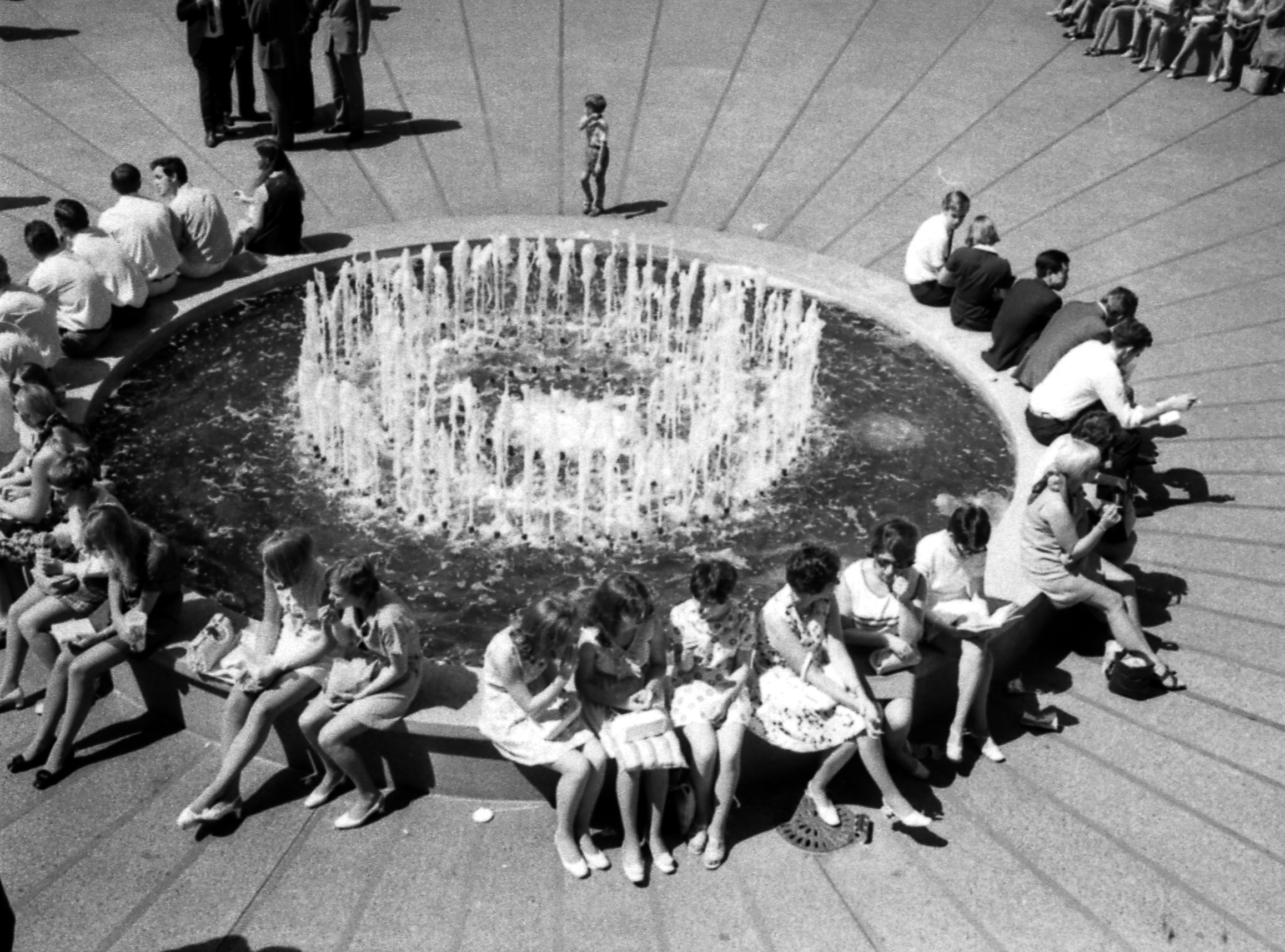
1967 Award, Australia Square, George Street, Sydney

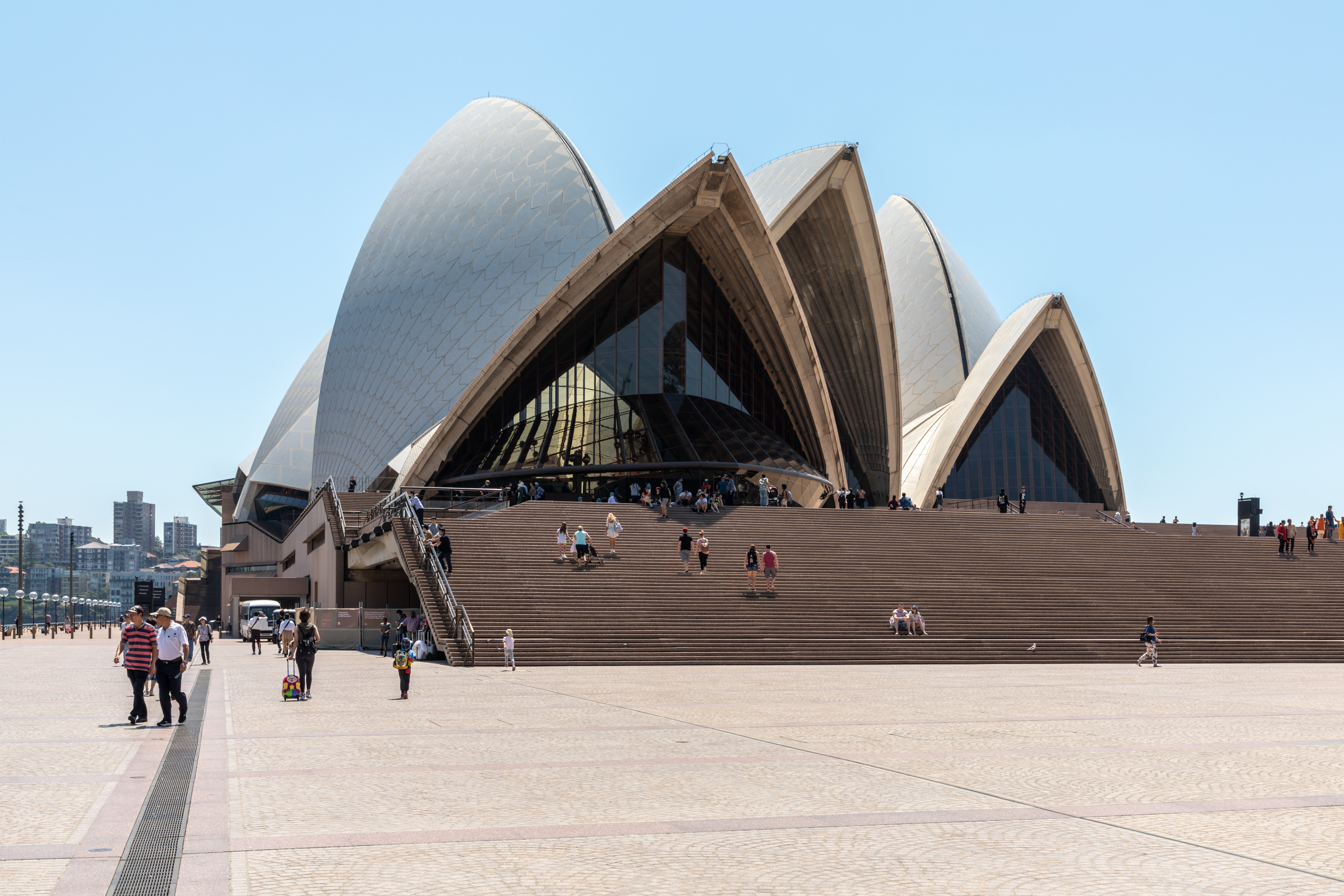
1980 Award, Sydney Opera House

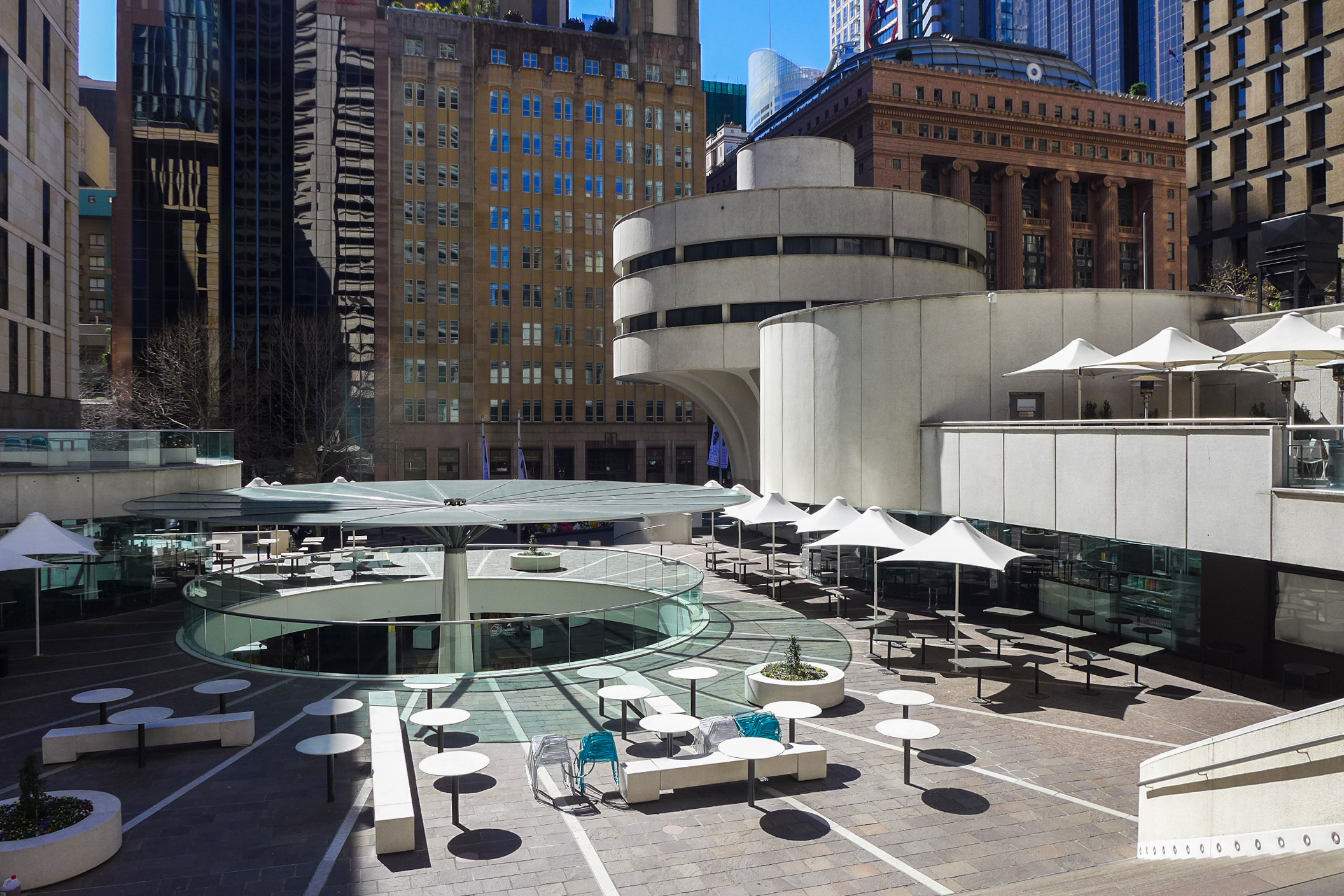
1981 Award, MLC Martin Place

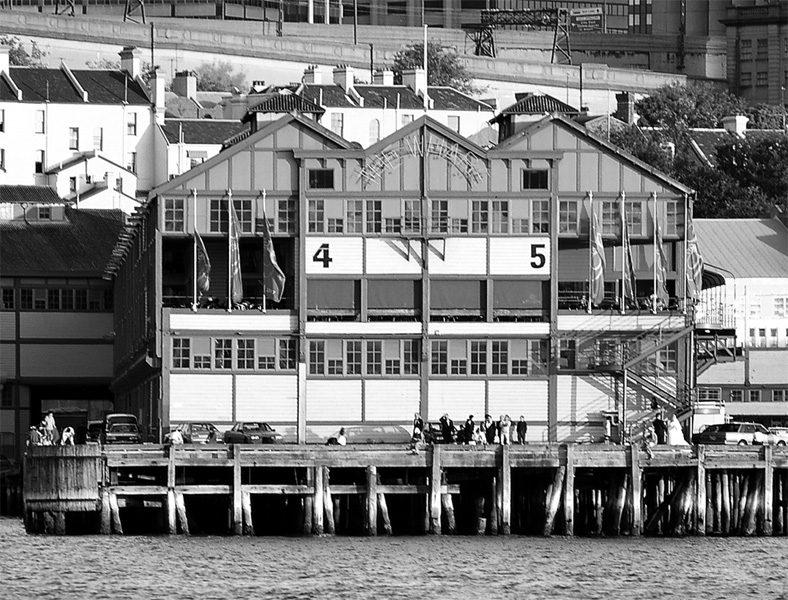
1985 Award, Wharf Theatre, Walsh Bay

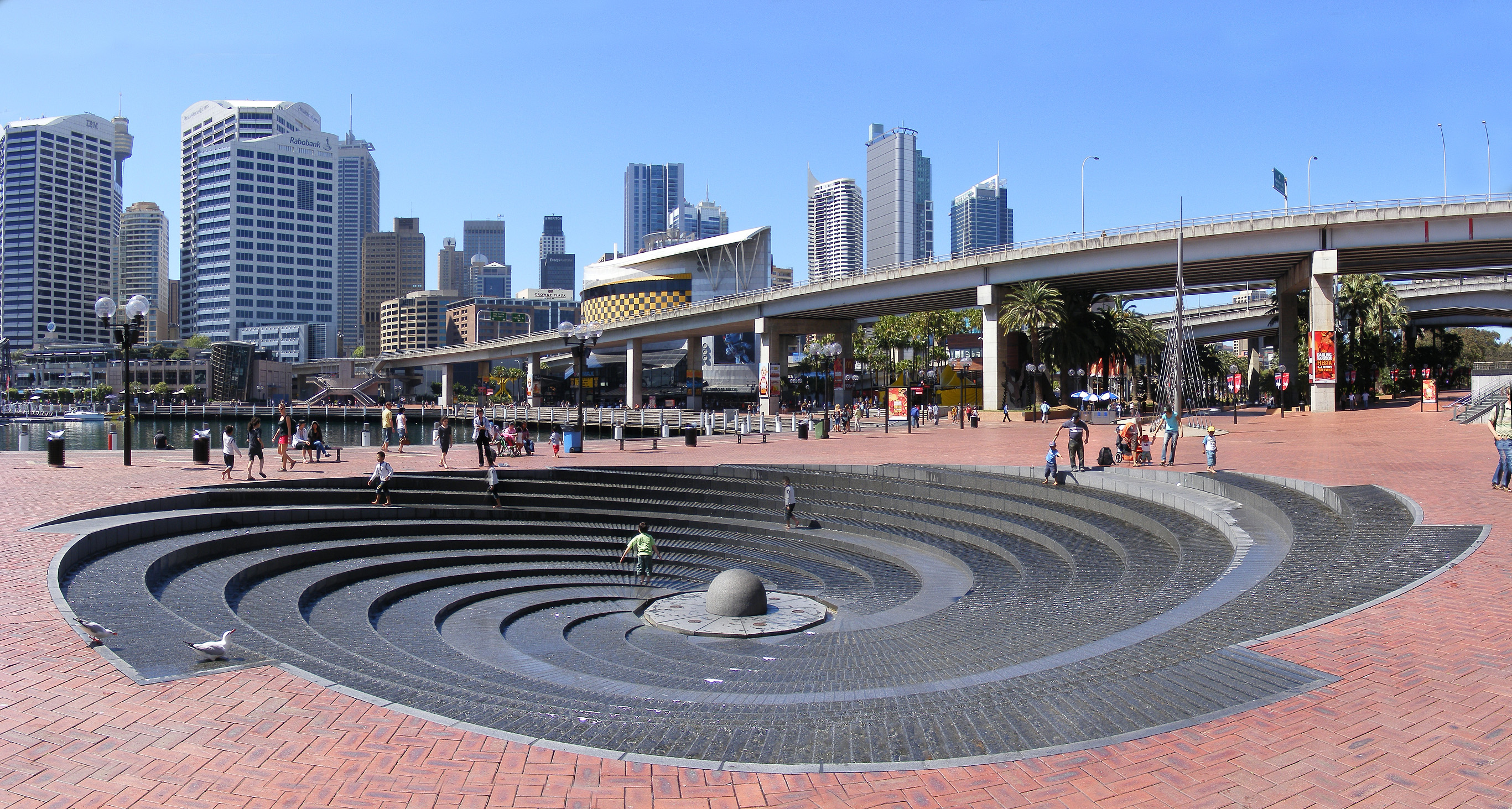
1991 Award, Darling Harbour Fountain, 'Tidal Cascade'

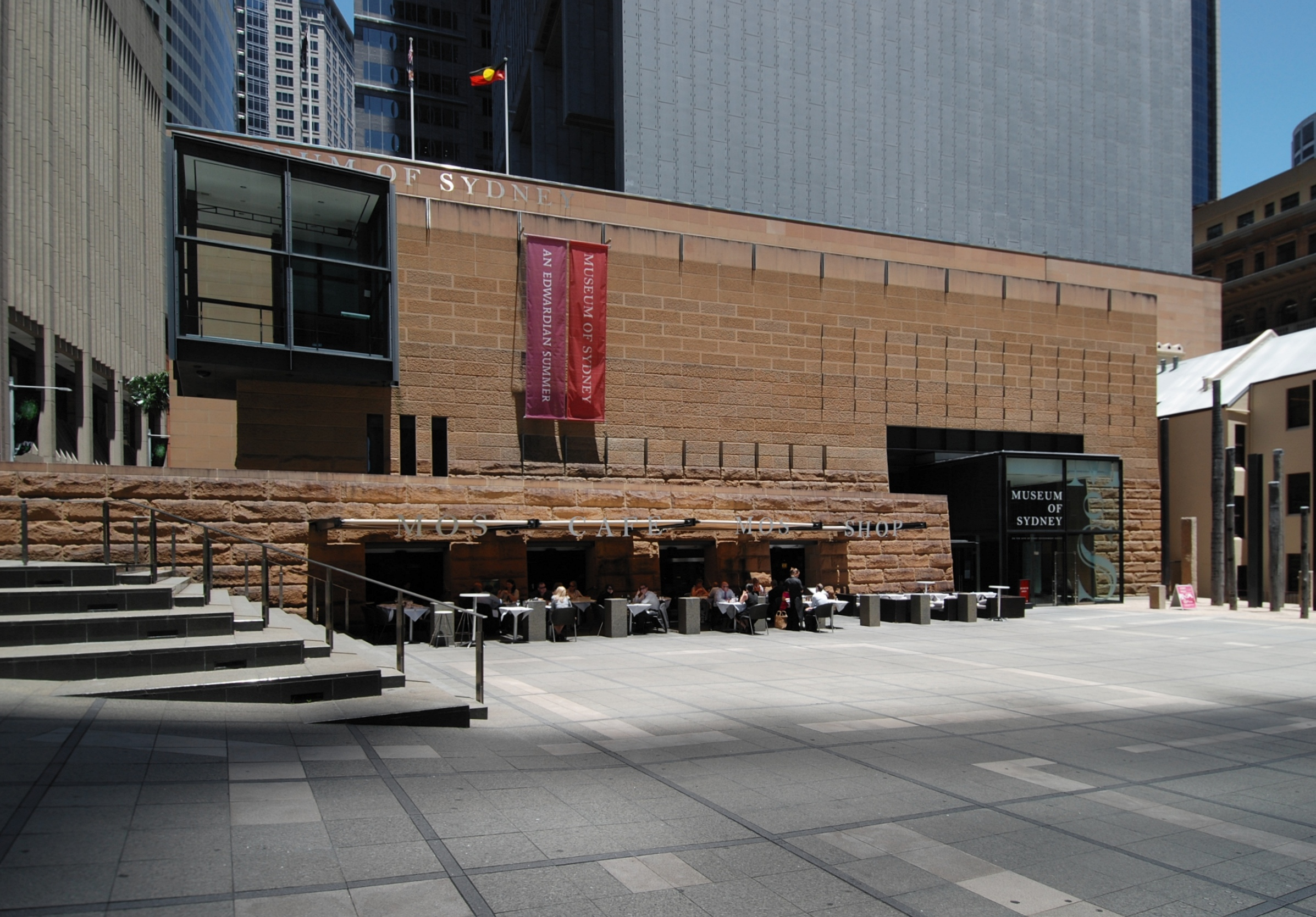
1995 Award, Museum of Sydney, Bridge Street, Sydney

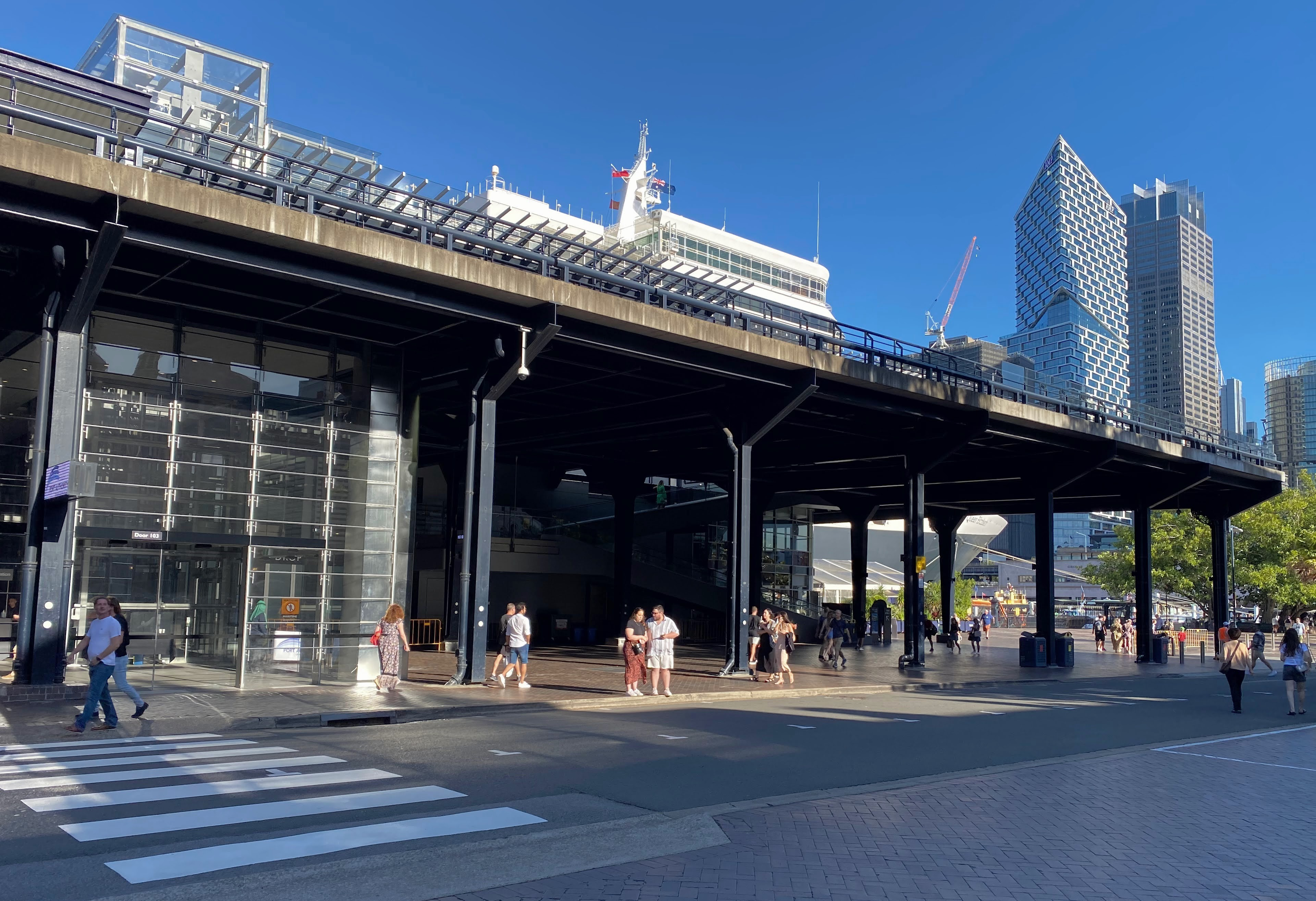
1997 Award, Overseas Passenger Terminal, Circular Quay

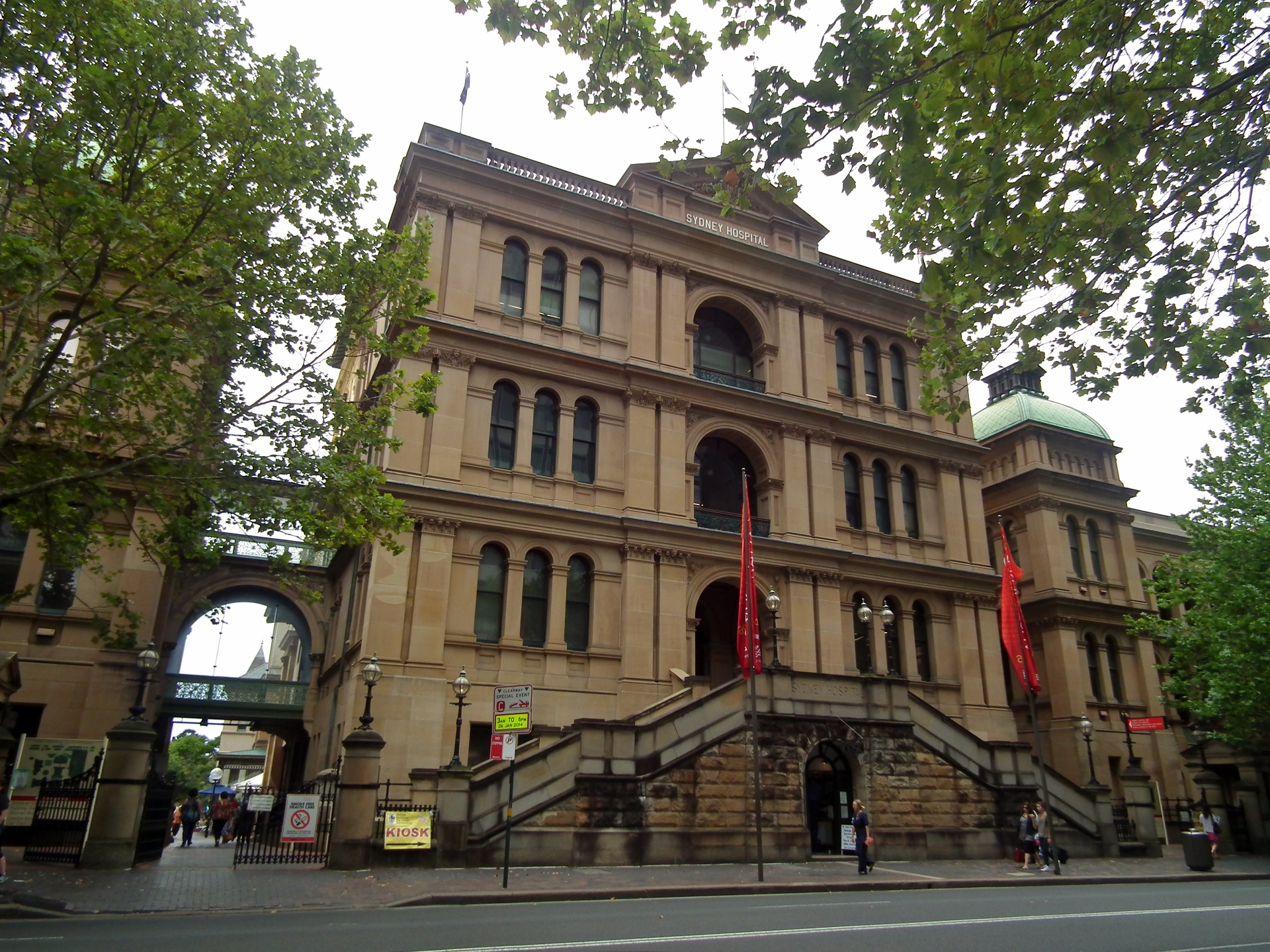
1997 Award, Sydney Hospital and Sydney Eye Hospital, Macquarie Street, Sydney

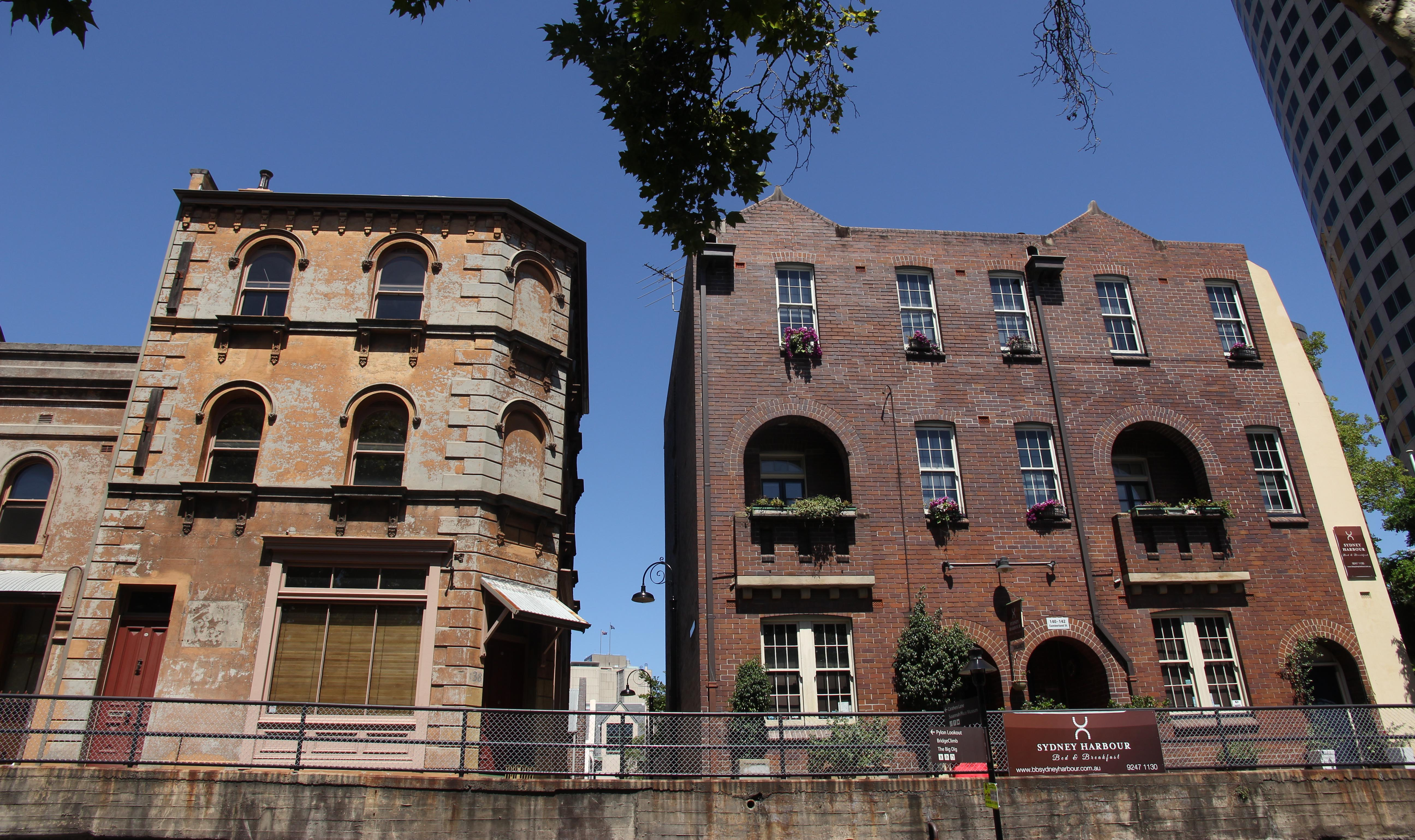
1998 Award, Long's Lane Precinct, The Rocks, Sydney

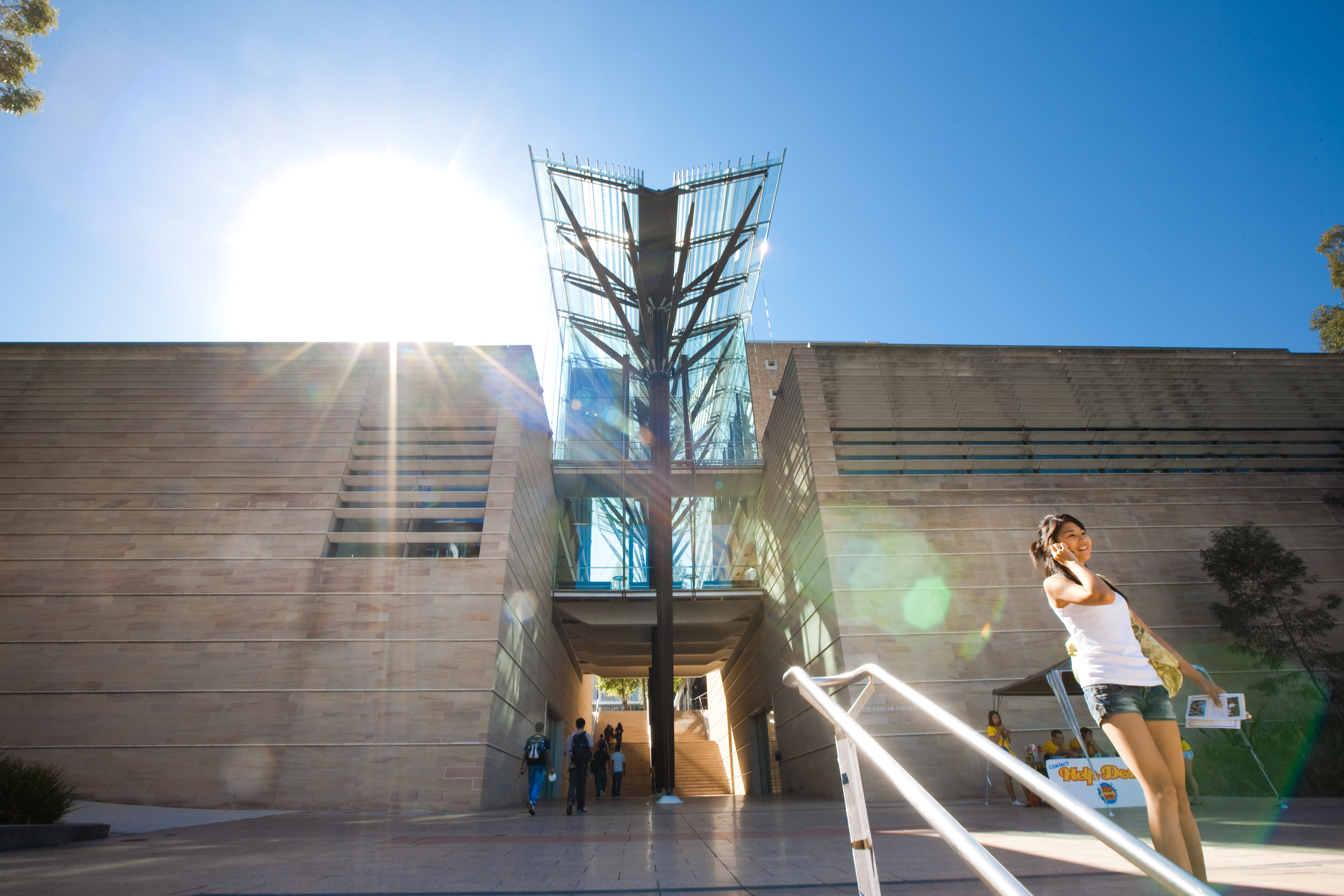
2000 Award, John Niland Scientia Building and Red Centre, UNSW

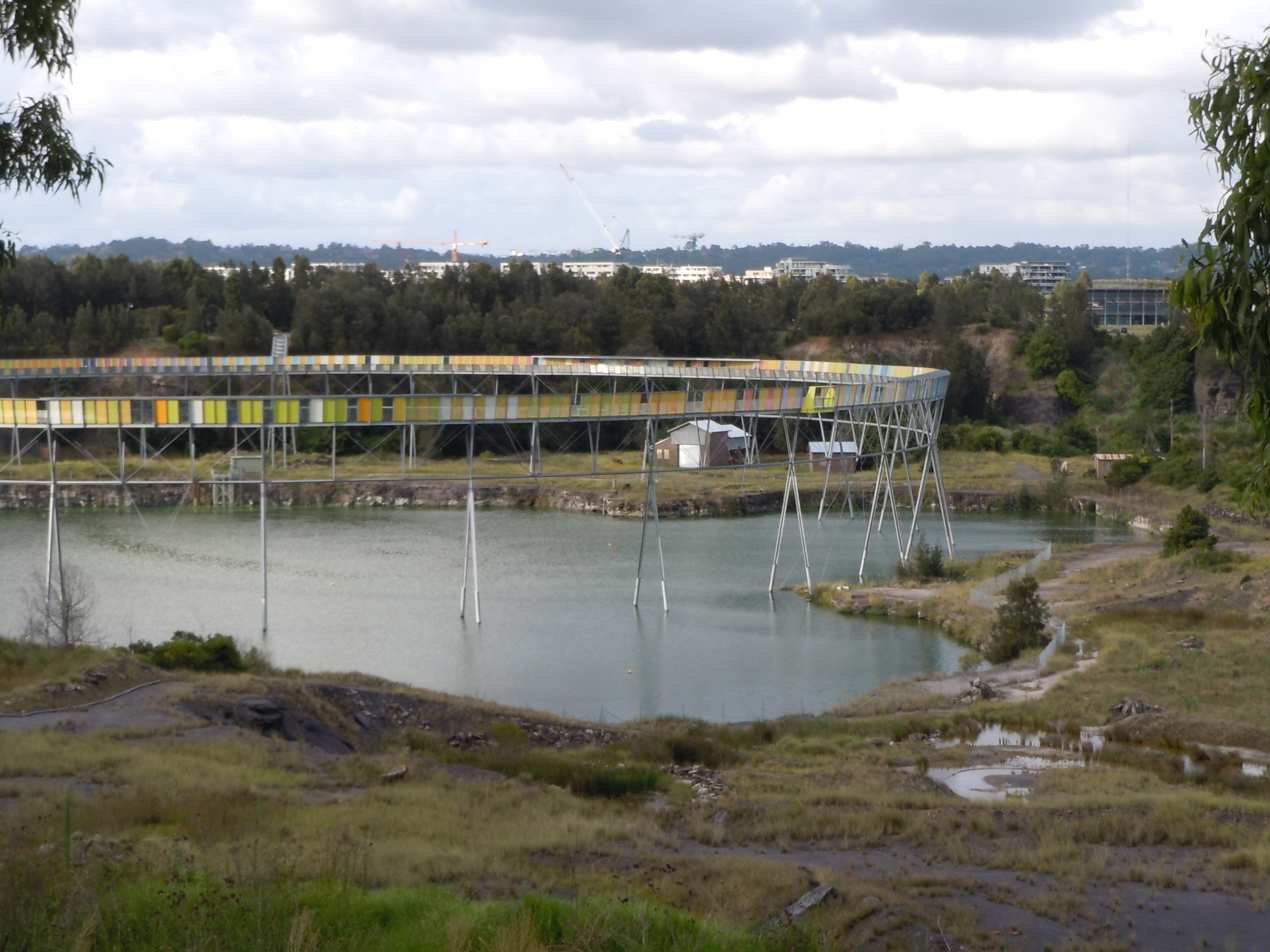
2006 Award, Brickpit Ring, Sydney Olympic Park

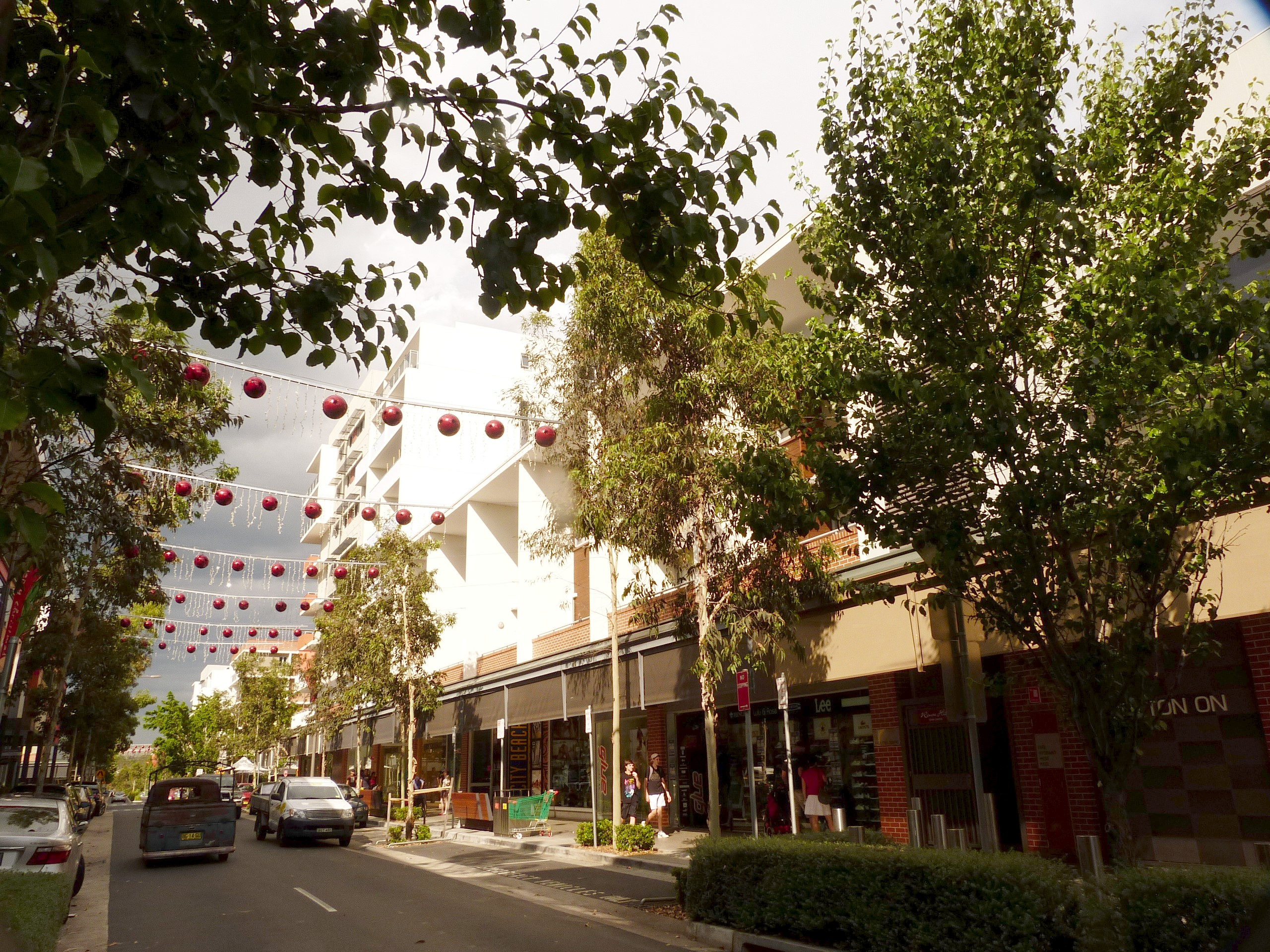
2008 Award, Rouse Hill Town Centre

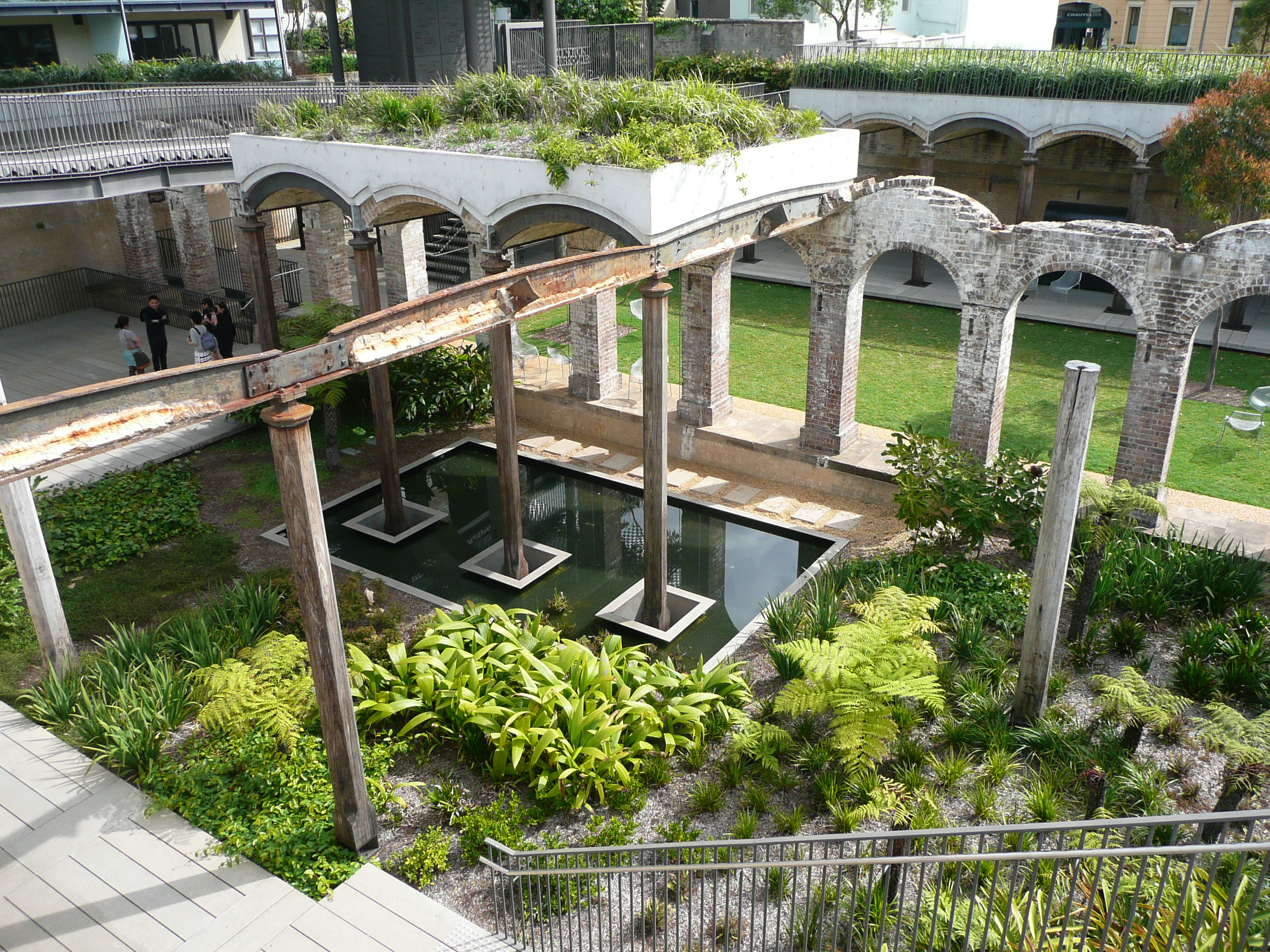
2010 Award, Paddington Reservoir Gardens

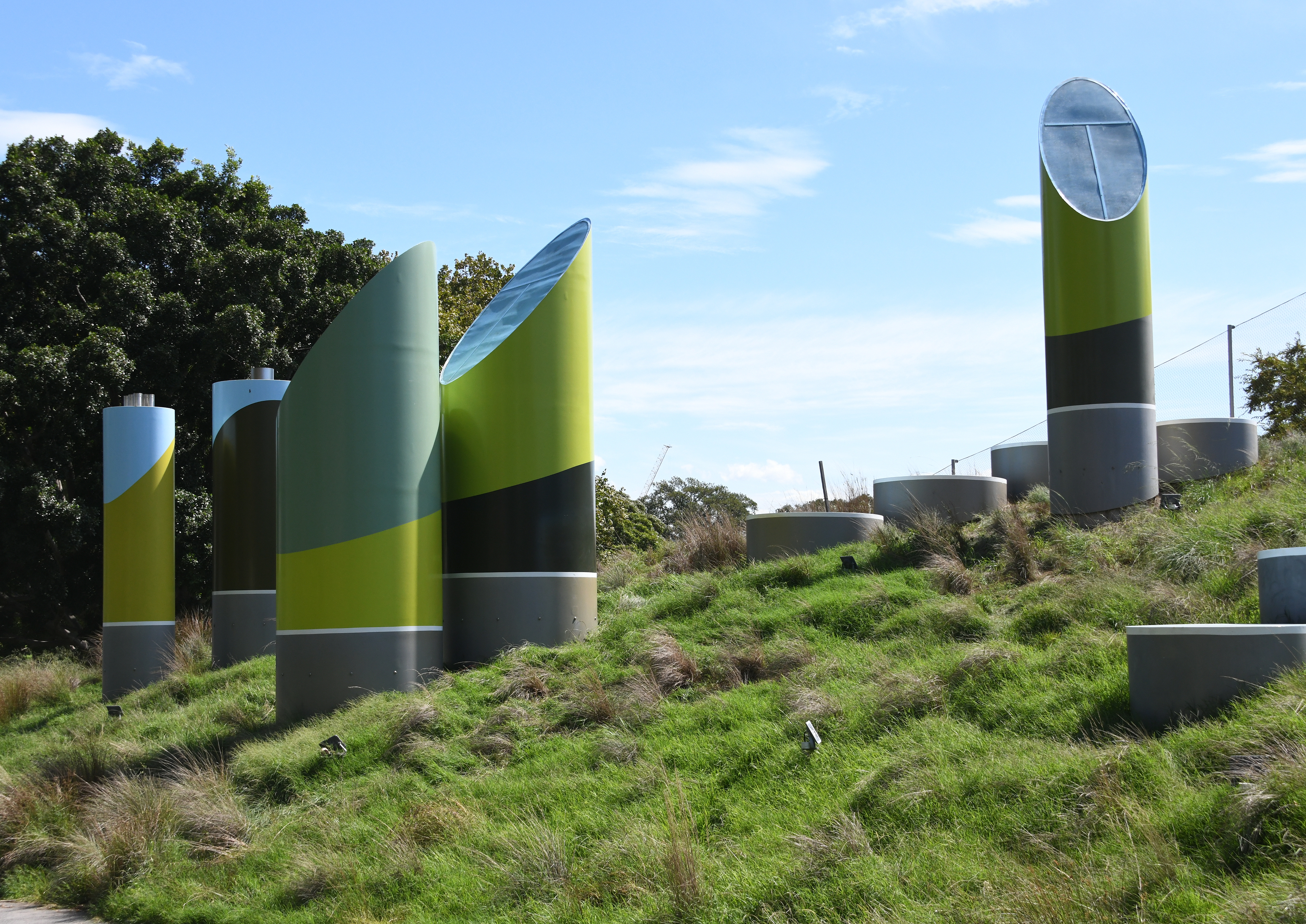
2014 Award, Prince Alfred Park and Pool

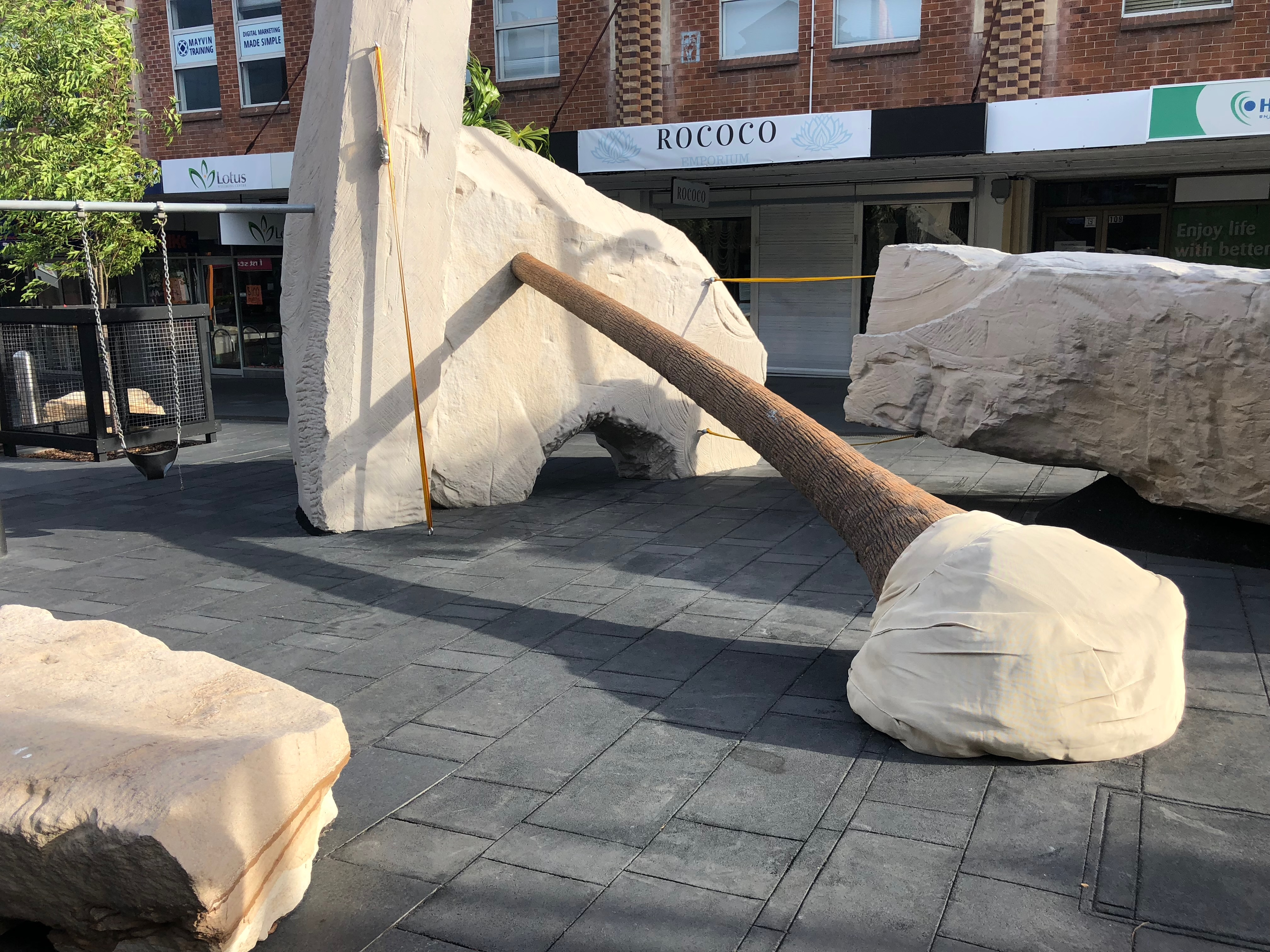
2015 Award, Crown Street Mall, Wollongong

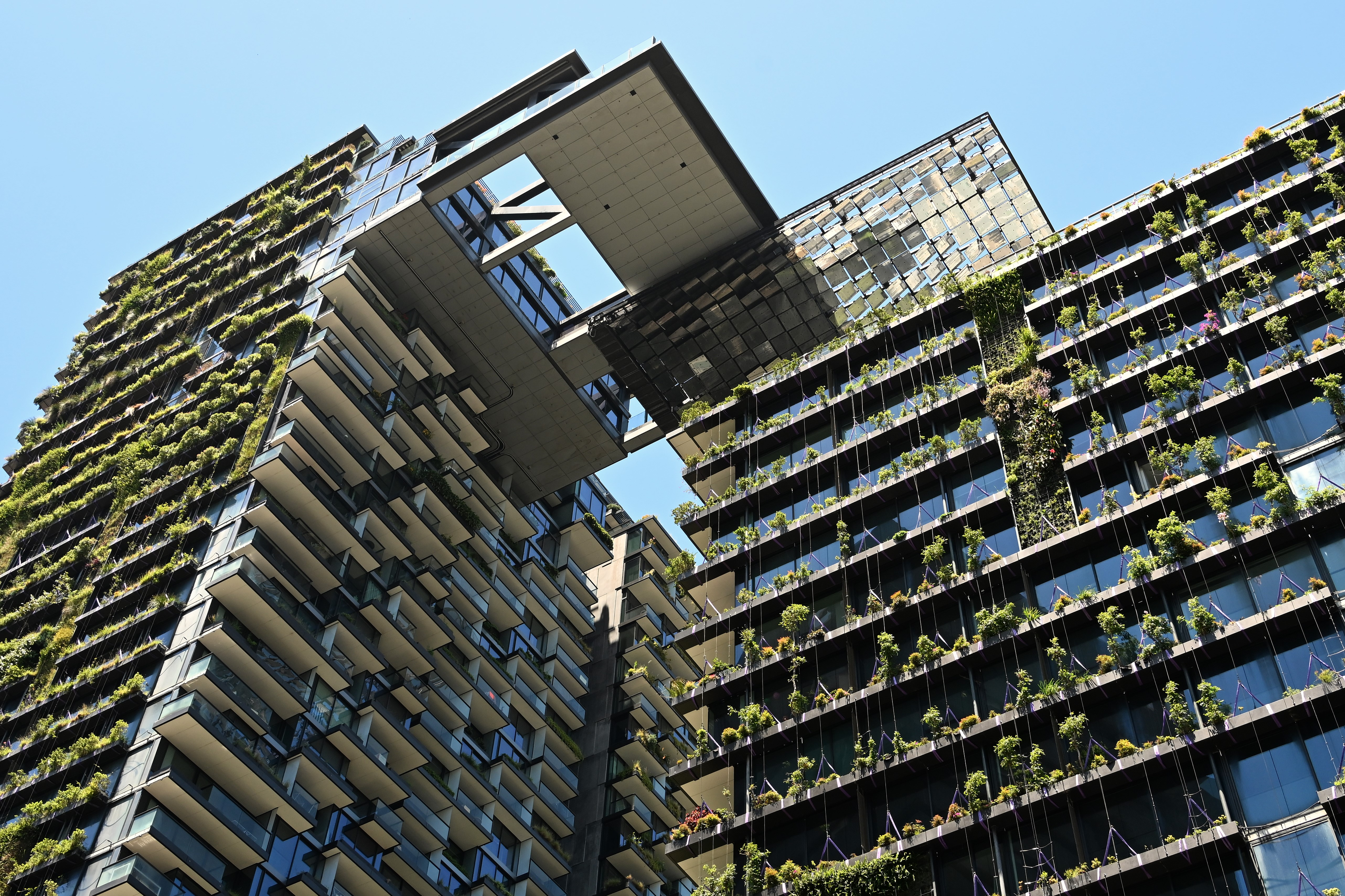
2017 Award, Central Park, Chippendale

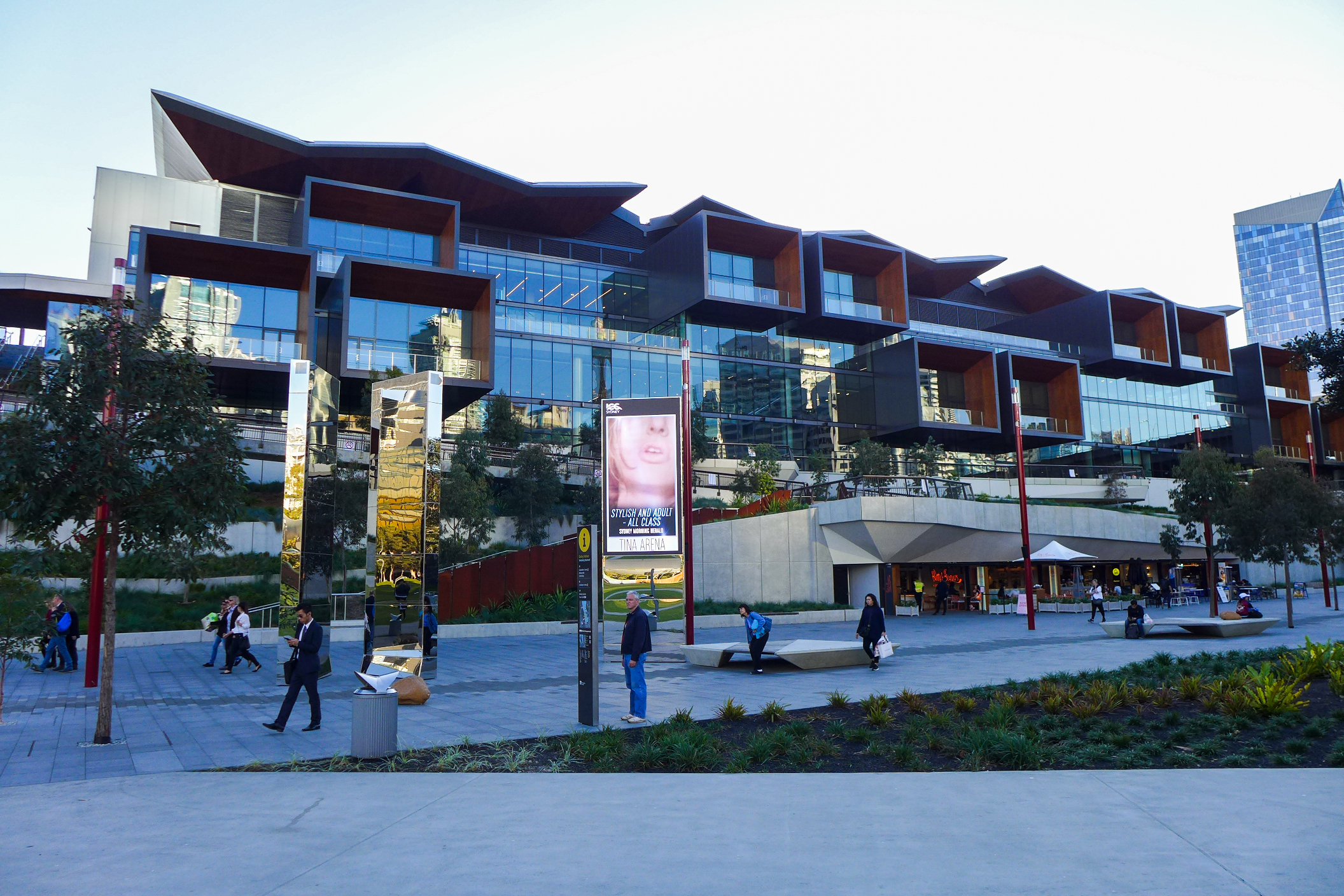
2018 Award, Darling Harbour Redevelopment

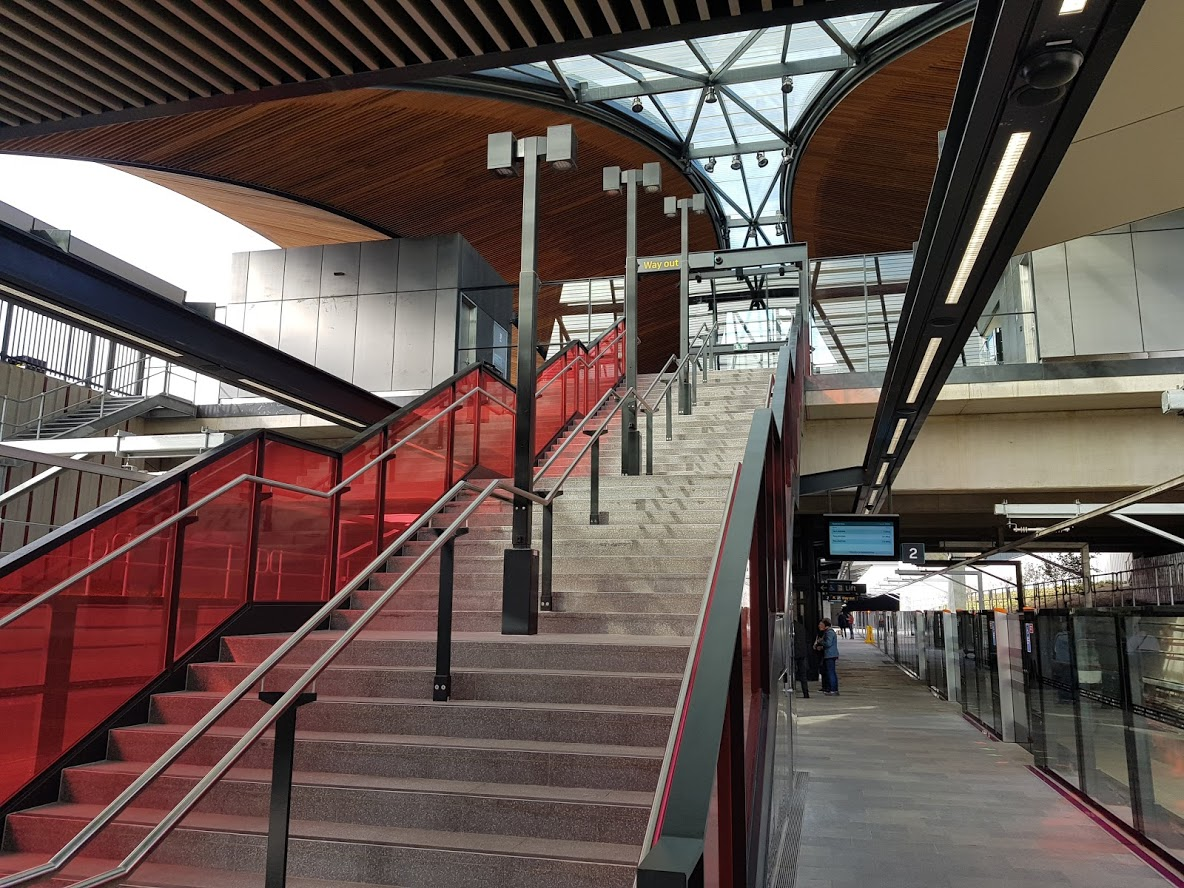
2020 Award, North West Sydney Metro Stations

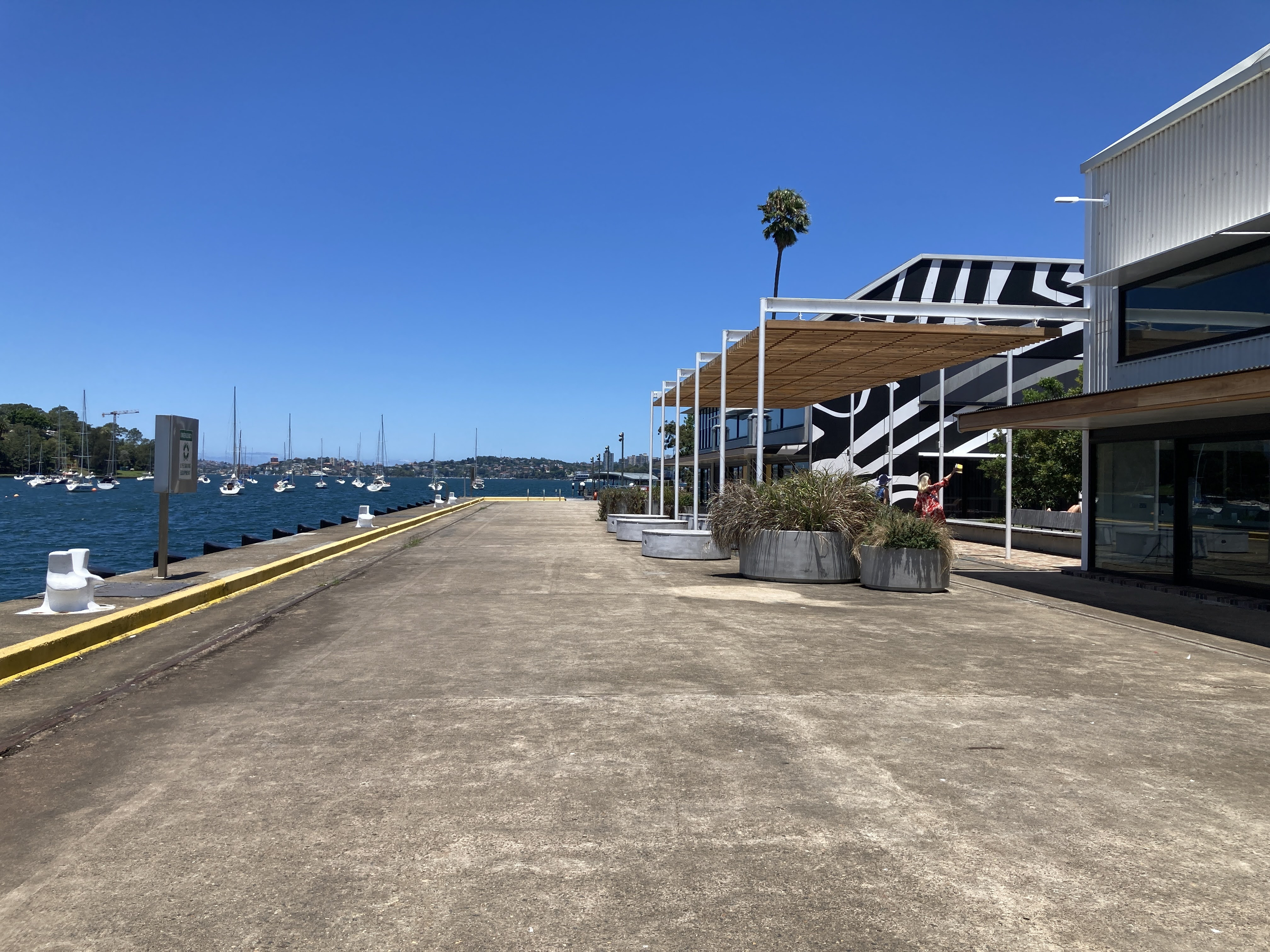
2021 Award, Sub Base Platypus, Stage 1

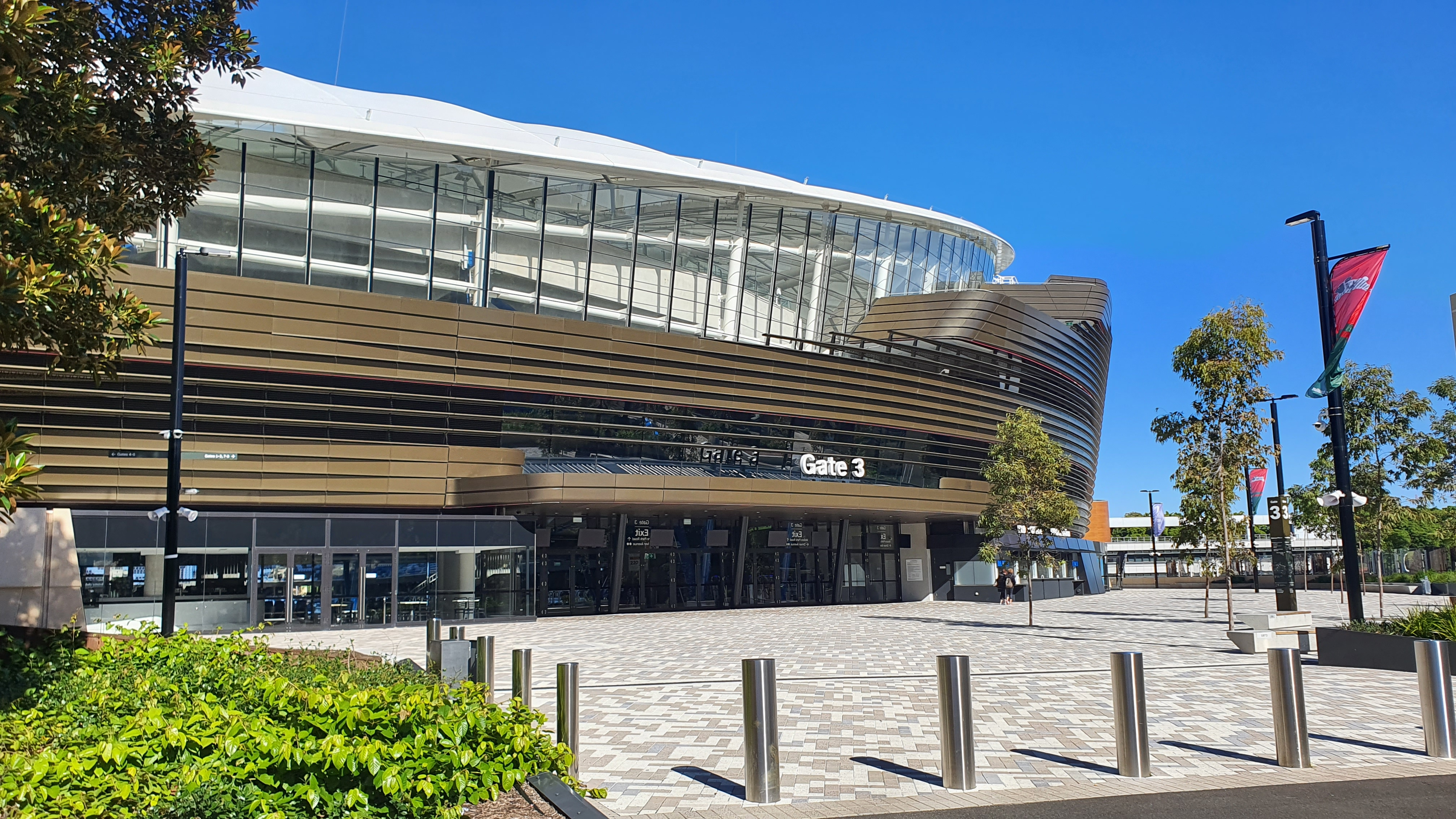
2024 Award, Allianz Stadium, Moore Park

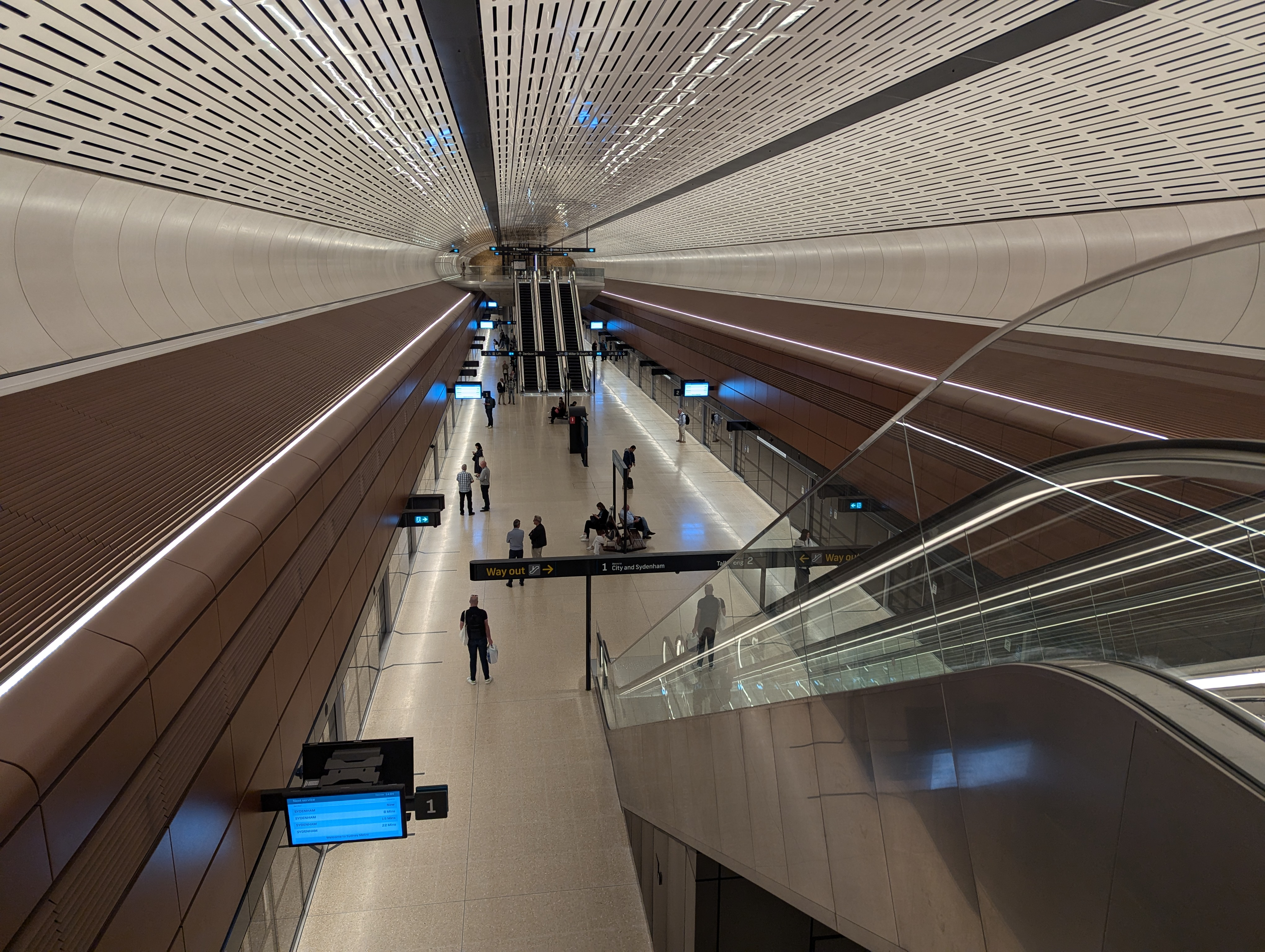
2025 Award, Sydney Metro Stations

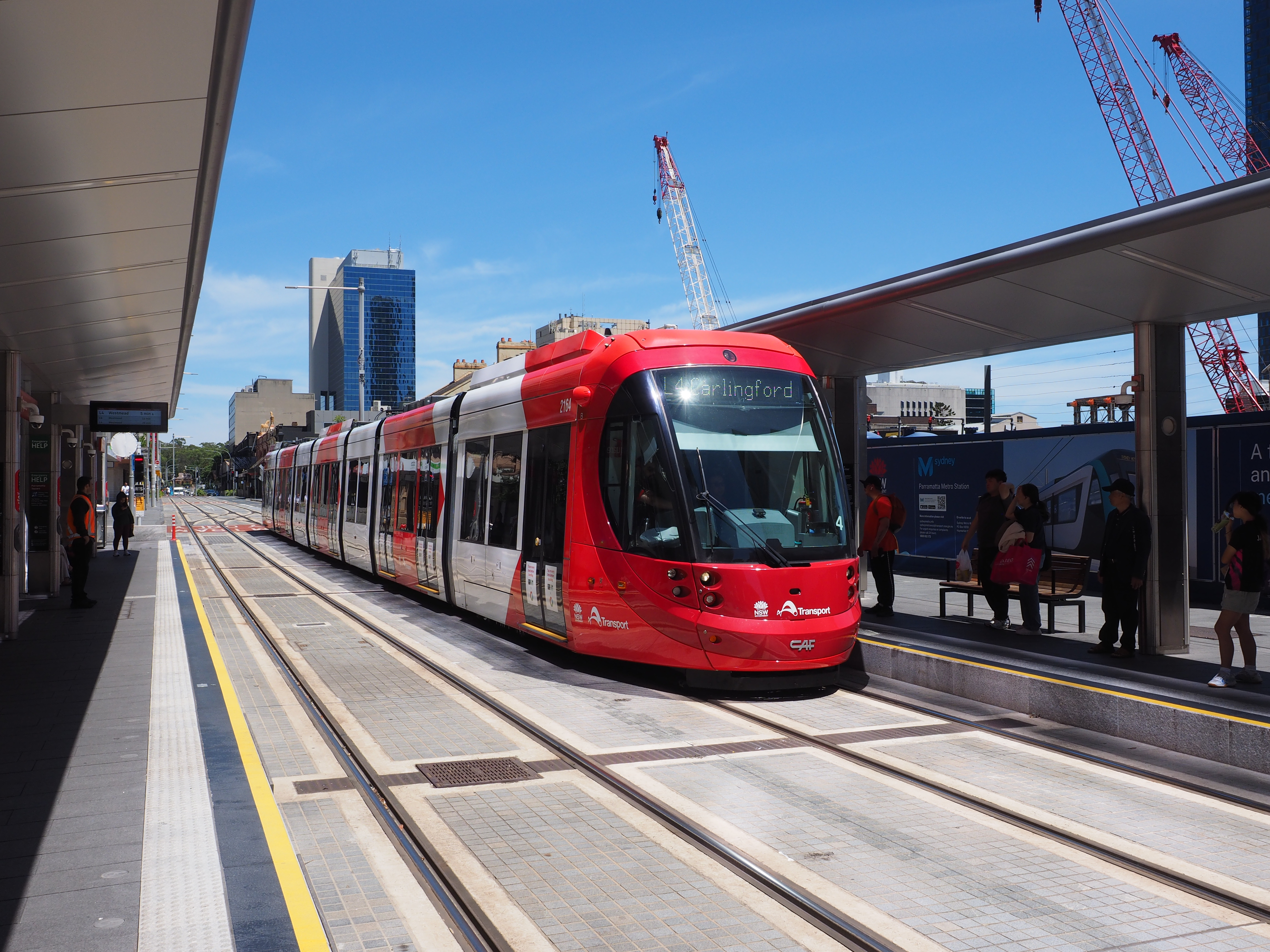
2026 Award, Parramatta Light Rail (Stage 1)

== See also ==
- Australian Institute of Architects
- Australian Institute of Architects Awards and Prizes
- Walter Burley Griffin Award for Urban Design
- Australian Urban Design Awards
