= Peter Hall (architect) =

Australian architect (1931–1995)

Peter Brian Hall
- Born: 16 May 1931; Merewether, Newcastle, New South Wales, Australia
- Died: 19 May 1995 (aged 64); St Leonards, Sydney, Australia
- Education: Cranbrook School, Sydney, School of Architecture, University of Sydney 1957
- Occupation: Architect
- Years active: 1958–1992
- Spouse(s): Elizabeth Bryant (m.1959—1969), Penelope Anne McDonnell (m.1970)
- Children: 6
- Awards: Sir John Sulman Medal, 1964; Lloyd Rees Civic Design Award, 1988; Walter Burley Griffin Award for Urban Design, 1988; New South Wales Enduring Architecture Award, 2006
- Practice: NSW Government Architect's Office (1958—1966); Director of Architecture Commonwealth Department of Housing and Construction, Canberra 1977—1980; Private practice: Hall Todd & Littlemore (1966—1969); Hall & Anderson (1969—1971); Hall Anderson & Bowe (1971—1973); Hall & Bowe (1973—1980); Hall Bowe & Webber (1980—1988); Hall & Webber (1988—1990)
- Buildings: Goldstein House UNSW
- Projects: Sydney Opera House

Peter Brian Hall (16 May 1931 – 19 May 1995) was an Australian architect active in Sydney and elsewhere from the 1950s to the early 1990s. Schooled in the tenets of modernism his practice was also informed by a strong sense of the importance of function and context in design. During his early years Hall was the recipient of numerous education scholarships and bursaries, most notably a traineeship and then employment with the office of the New South Wales Government Architect, a source of highly creative architecture during the 1960s. However, Hall is best known for completing the Sydney Opera House after the resignation of its original architect, Jørn Utzon, in February 1966. At the age of 34, he was invited by the Government Architect to act as design architect in the newly formed consortium Hall Todd & Littlemore to resolve the issues which had led to Utzon's resignation, principally the design of all the interiors and the enclosing glass walls of the unfinished building. The Opera House opened in October 1973 and despite its subsequent success as Sydney's most popular performance venue, understanding of the work of Hall and his team has been coloured by the controversial circumstances of their appointment. For Hall, both personally and professionally, Utzon's legacy was a poisoned chalice – an unprecedented challenge to complete the building to a standard commensurate with its sublime exterior, but one that brought little recognition during his lifetime.

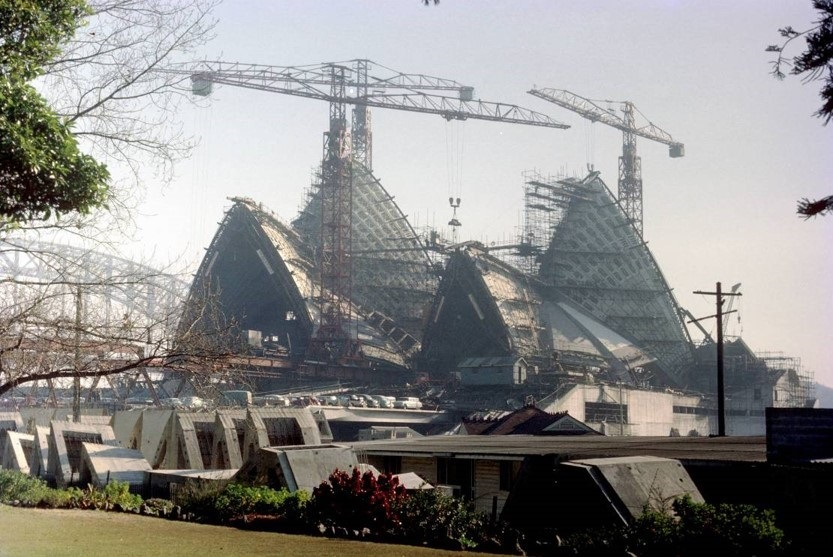
Sydney Opera House under construction as photographed by Hall in late 1965, shortly before he replaced Jorn Utzon as design architect on the building.

== Early life and career ==
Hall was born in Newcastle, New South Wales and spent his childhood in Narrabri and Boggabri, two towns in the North Western Slopes region of New South Wales. A high-achieving student, he won scholarships to Cranbrook School, Sydney (1943), and to the University of Sydney and Wesley College in 1949. He was first a student of languages and archaeology, then transferred to architecture, graduating with degrees in both Architecture (1957) and Arts (1958). In undergraduate years he also held a traineeship with the Government Architect's Office of the NSW Public Works Department, working in the office after graduation until early 1966.

Winning the University of Sydney's Hezlet Bequest Scholarship in 1958, Hall travelled overseas and in June 1959 married Libby Bryant, a former University of Sydney architecture student, in London. They embarked on an extended tour of Europe. Hall was particularly absorbed by the architecture of the Mediterranean countries and also admired the early work of Jørn Utzon who in 1957 had won the design competition for the Sydney Opera House. In Denmark Hall included a visit to Utzon's studio in Hellebaek, unsuccessfully seeking short-term work because he could not stay long enough to make his employment worthwhile. After this comprehensive ‘grand tour’ the couple returned to London where Hall gained further experience in the office of Anderson Forster & Wilcox 1959–60.

Returning to Sydney to work in the Government Architect's office, Peter Hall was responsible for designing a range of public buildings. These included extensions to the Registrar-General's building, the Law Courts in Taylor Square, Sydney, the new Library for Macquarie University, and new buildings for Chemistry and Agricultural Economics at the University of New England, Armidale. His design for Goldstein Dining Hall at the University of New South Wales won the Royal Australian Institute of Architects’ Sir John Sulman Medal in 1964. Goldstein Hall established Hall's reputation in the architectural profession and in early February 1966 he left the Government Architect's Office to begin private practice.

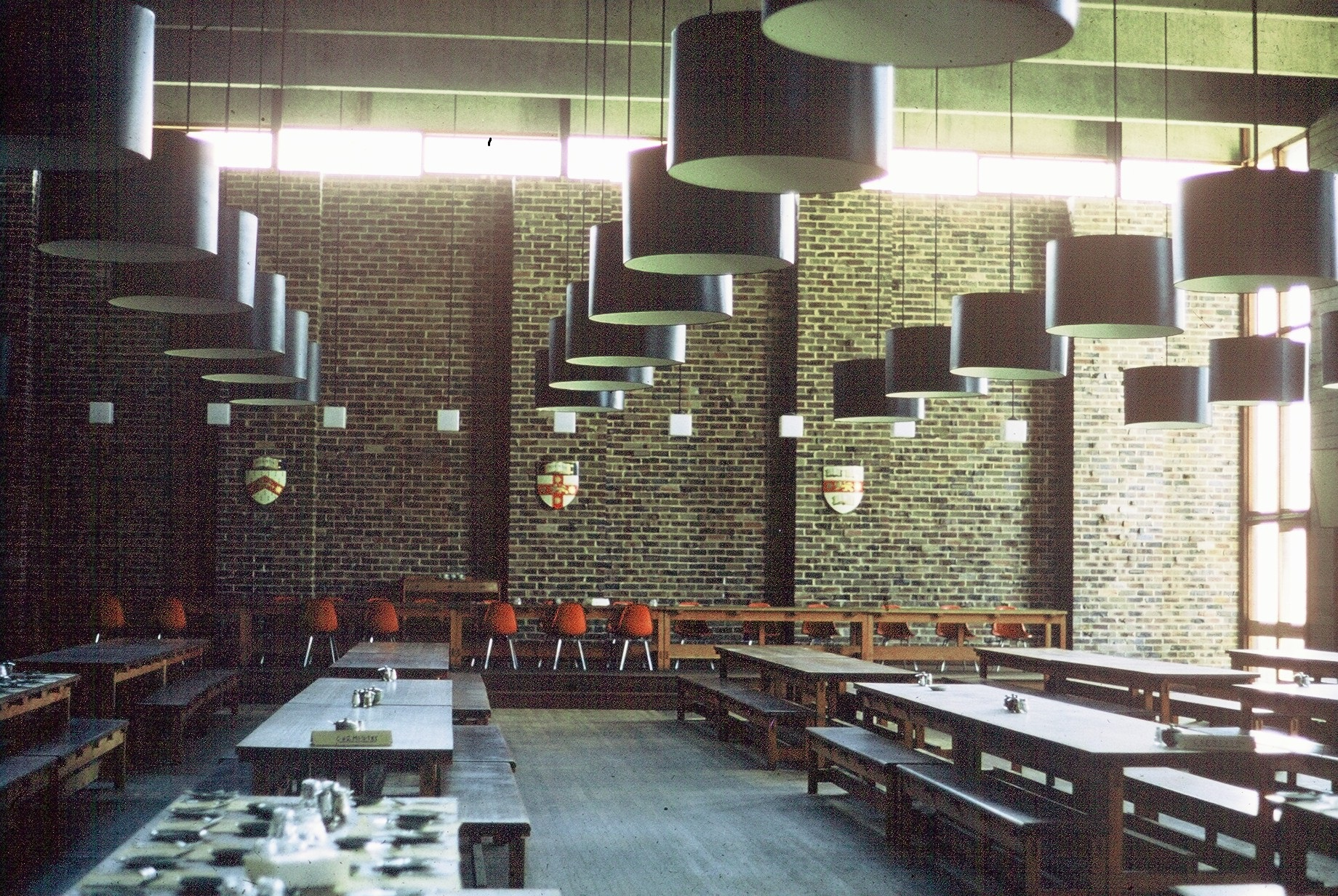
Peter Hall, Goldstein Hall refectory, University of New South Wales, Sydney, 1964. The Goldstein college complex won Hall the prestigious Sulman Medal in 1965.

== Sydney Opera House ==
From the announcement of Jørn Utzon's winning Sydney Opera House competition entry in January 1957 to the building's opening in October 1973, the project – and its architects, consultants and contractors – were dogged by controversy, political intervention, cost escalations and unprecedented design and technological hurdles. By the mid-1960s issues of cost, politics, Utzon's relatively unorthodox design methodology, vague user requirements, lack of resolution over the interiors and the slow pace of the project had created a troubling impasse. Utzon's shock resignation on 28 February 1966 reverberated around the world.

In the ensuing tumult Hall, despite his initial support for the ‘Bring Utzon Back’ cause, contentiously accepted an invitation to form the consortium Hall Todd & Littlemore, established by the government to finish the building. David Littlemore, of Rudder Littlemore & Rudder, was responsible for construction supervision and Lionel Todd, of Hanson Todd & Partners, for contract documentation. None of the three architects had met before, let alone worked together. Hall, as design architect, was confronted with a logjam of problems, not the least of which was the pressing need to resolve the stalemate over the conflicting seating and acoustic requirements of the dual-purpose main hall. Writing later of the dilemma faced by the new architects in 1966, Hall lamented the 'complete lack of a brief and input of user organisations':

The job was being built, in effect, without definition of what was expected of it. ... One of the accusations made ... was that we would reduce the quality of the job. We had no such intention. The big question, though, was what were we supposed to build.

To this end Hall undertook an extensive study tour of concert and opera halls in Europe and the USA in mid 1966. His subsequent recommendation to the government, with the support of international theatre and acoustic experts, was that a single-purpose main auditorium was the ideal around which a new brief should be structured. Released a few days before Christmas 1966, the ‘Review of Programme’, with its central proposal for a 2800-seat concert hall and the relocation of opera to the Minor Hall, provoked a furore unprecedented even by Opera House standards.

When he accepted the commission Hall had assumed that he would face the relatively simple task of completing Utzon's well-resolved designs, only to be confronted with the complex challenge of designing entirely new theatres to a new brief, within the existing concrete shells. The design of the enclosing northern glass walls alone posed unprecedented technical problems which were resolved through the collaboration of Hall and Ove Arup & Partners, the project's structural engineers.

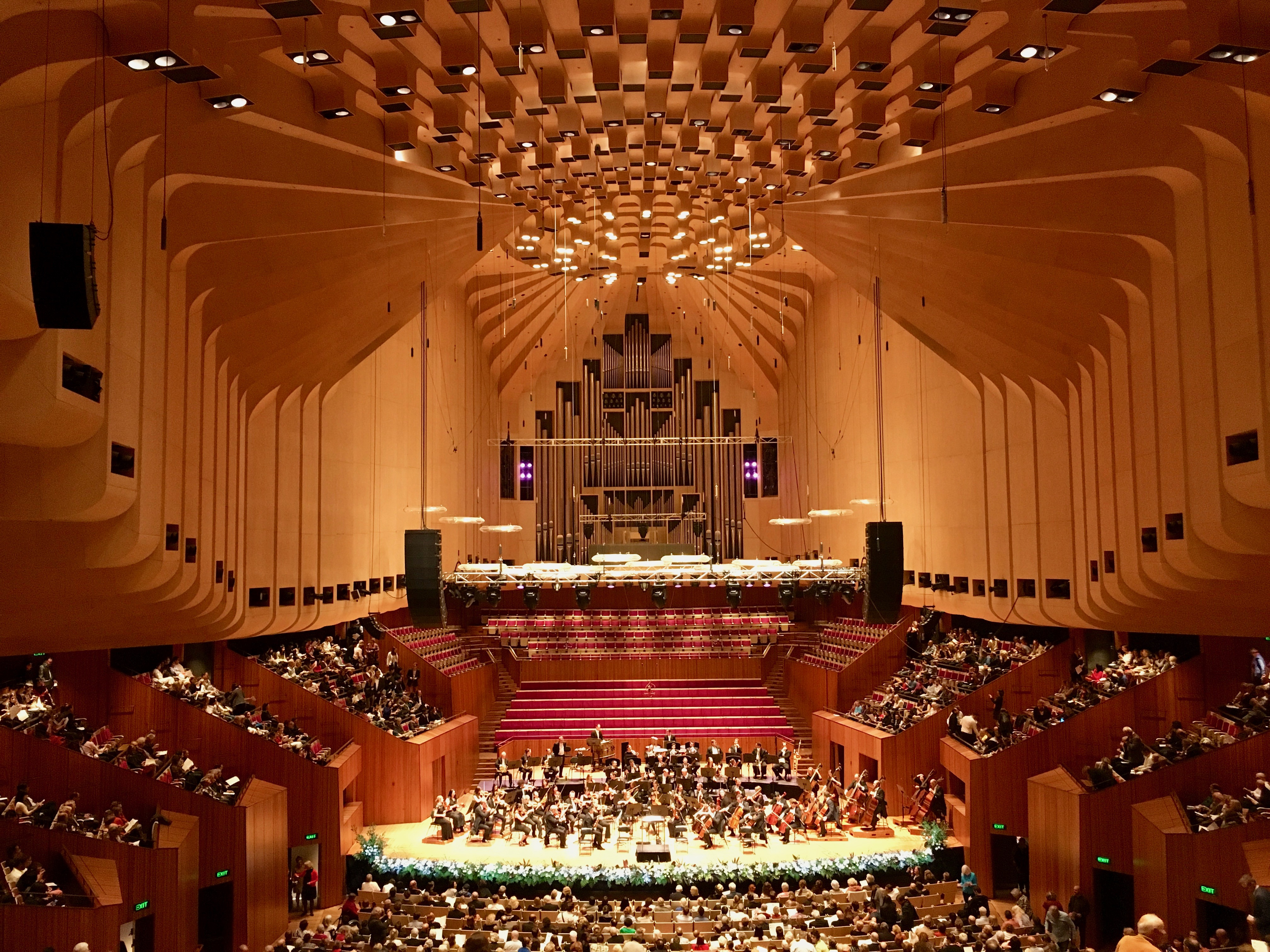
Interior of Sydney Opera House Concert Hall, about 2017.

Despite its long and conflicted gestation, since its opening in October 1973 the Opera House has been highly successful – with audiences, performers and visitors and as an inspirational masterpiece of 20th century architecture. In 2007 the building was declared a UNESCO World Heritage Site. Utzon benefitted in his later career from the building's status but for Hall, who died in impoverished circumstances in 1995, acknowledgment has only come posthumously, due much to the controversial nature of his appointment and a lack of awareness of the complex issues he and his team faced in early 1966. Hall rarely talked about the difficulties confronted in completing the Opera House but his dedication in a book given to Concert Hall project architect John Zaat in 1973 provides a poignant reminder of the impact of the project on his professional and private life: John. A reminder of a successful struggle in which we both suffered. Peter Hall, 1973.

== Belated recognition ==
In 2006 Hall was awarded the Royal Australian Institute of Architects’ (NSW Chapter) 25 Year Award in 2006 in recognition of his contribution to the Opera House. The jury cited Hall's interiors as ‘among the major achievements of Australian architects of the 1960s and 1970s’ and that they combined with Utzon's ‘great vision and magnificent exterior’ to form ‘one of the world's great working buildings’. More recently a number of research projects and publications have examined Hall's career and reassessed his role in the completion of the Opera House. Research has been informed by a re-examination of the circumstances leading to Utzon's resignation and the revelations of Hall’s personal papers, now in the collection of the State Library of NSW. In 2015 the association OpusSOH Inc was formed to promote recognition of Hall’s work and in 2016 he was the subject of the Australian Broadcasting Commission’s documentary ‘Australian Story’. The fourth, revised, edition of the Opera House Conservation Management Plan (2017) acknowledges and documents Hall and his team's contribution, assessing the radially-ribbed plywood Concert Hall as of ‘exceptional significance’ within the building's significance hierarchy.

== Post-Opera House career ==
Following the challenges of completing the Opera House, Hall established a practice in North Sydney (1969—1992) first as Hall and Anderson, later Hall and Bowe, then Hall Bowe and Webber. He was responsible for the design of numerous buildings including the Sports and Aquatic Centre at Sydney University; North Sydney Technical College Stage 7; renovation and conversion of the Marian Street Theatre Killara; individual houses and commercial projects; and the Blue Circle (now Boral) Southern Cement Plant at Berrima, NSW, consulting to Ove Arup and Partners. The Berrima project was awarded the Concrete Institute of Australia's Award of Excellence in 1979 and is notable for Hall's characteristic strong and elegant integration of structure and form.

From 1977 to 1980 Hall accepted a three-year contract as Director of Architecture, Commonwealth Department of Housing and Construction, Canberra. He brought his management skills to bear on the task of revitalising a somewhat moribund and engineer-dominated public office which employed over 400 architects throughout Australia. He transformed the organisation of architectural services, integrated design and construction teams, involved leading private practice firms in design work, and activated a range of review panels for major projects including the Australian Defence Forces Academy and the Garden Island Naval Base.

In the mid 1980s Hall worked on the design of the forecourt of the Sydney Opera House, developing its form, structure, paving and finishes in association with the office of the NSW Government Architect. The forecourt won the Lloyd Rees Civic Design Award in 1988.

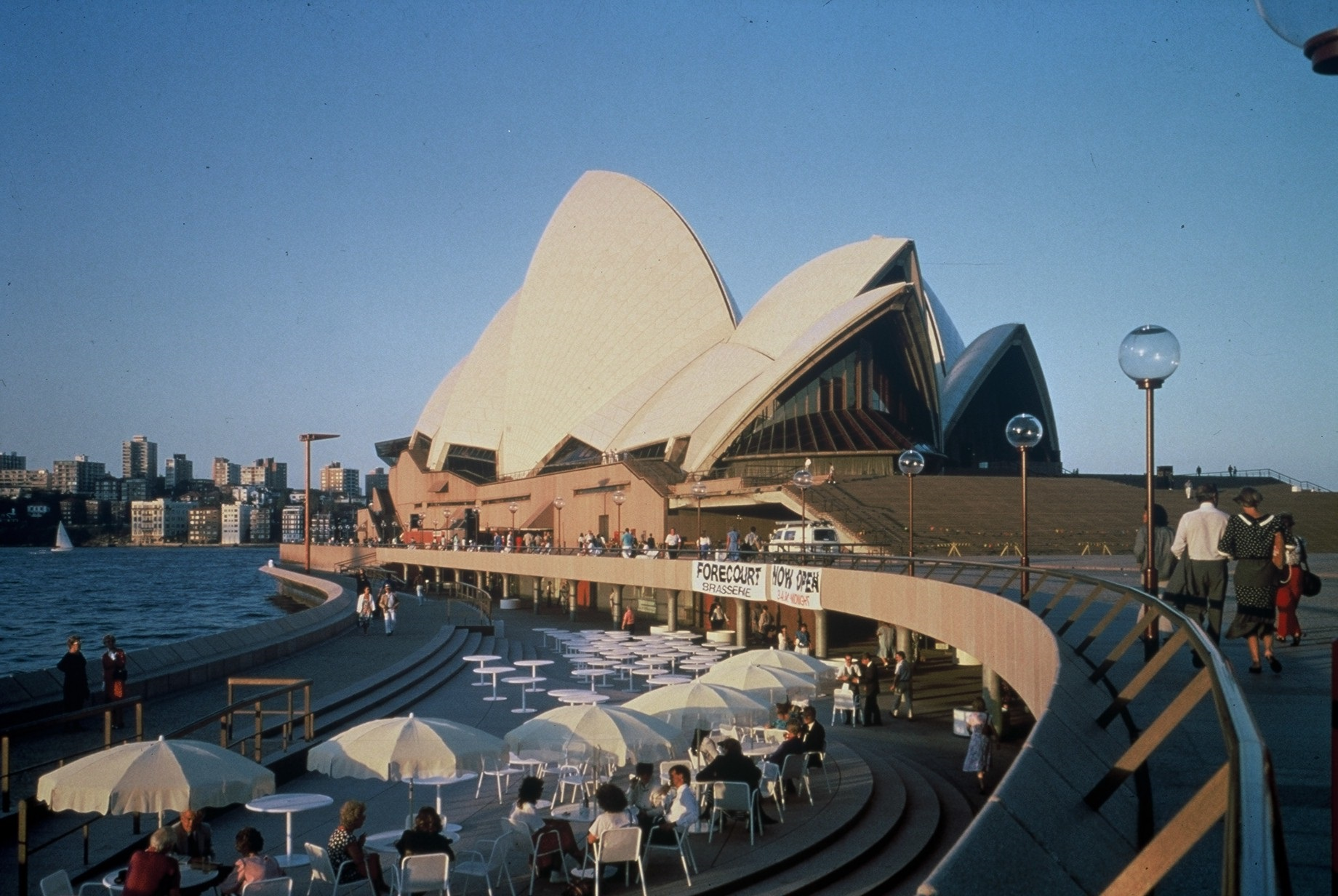
Sydney Opera House forecourt and concourse soon after completion in 1988. Hall worked on the project in conjunction with the New South Wales Government Architect's Office.

In community service Hall contributed his expertise as a board member of the Australia Council for the Arts, the Marionette Theatre of Australia, and chaired the Theatre Board of the Australia Council.

== Death and legacy ==
Peter Hall died of a stroke on 19 May 1995, his deteriorating health perhaps exacerbated by the rekindling of old controversies in the exhibition, ‘Unseen Utzon’, at the Opera House in late 1994 and early 1995. He is survived by his second wife Penelope and five adult children to two marriages. Hall's first wife Libby, from whom he was divorced in 1969, died in 2016.

After Hall's death former Government Architect Ted Farmer penned a moving eulogy:

I had to choose a design architect who would replace Utzon. I then asked Peter if he would do this but warned him that the project would always be mixed up with politics. That it could lead to fame for him or the reverse ... After a great deal of thought he accepted. He succeeded beyond doubt but there is no doubt he sacrificed his career in loyalty to his profession and to me personally.

== Personality and interests ==
Hall was known for his appreciation for cars, wine, theatre and conversation. He played cricket, golf and squash. Friends and former colleagues have described his professional honesty and courtesy, his readiness to listen to and absorb the ideas of others, to compliment and champion where appropriate and to work collaboratively with fellow architects and consultants: ″as an architect to work for, he knew what he wanted to see and didn't change his mind - he was the best fellow I've ever worked with, bar none. ... He didn't interfere in the technicalities of how it happened. What he was interested in was the finished result ... it was a relationship that I enjoyed enormously. He was good.″

Hall enjoyed overseas travel, his letters and travel diaries recording his wide-ranging interests — art, architecture, history – and cultural curiosity. Throughout his adult life he remained closely attuned to contemporary art and design trends. In the mid 1960s he designed renowned Sydney interior designer Marion Hall Best's Woollahra shop, with its Japanese tatami-matted floors, modern Scandinavian furniture and colourful Marimekko fabrics. For the Opera House he specified bold carpet and upholstery colours as a counterpoint to the dominant concrete and plywood interior elements and, with interior designer Diana Luxton, designed the moulded plywood theatre seating – still in use today – to complement the interior cladding. Records show that Hall was unafraid to go into battle with the government to ensure the highest quality fittings and fixtures and strong contemporary colours. At the media launch of the seating design in 1972 he declared ‘I’ve chosen clear, strong colours like the ones Matisse used … Nobody's going to walk through muted, grey interiors here.’

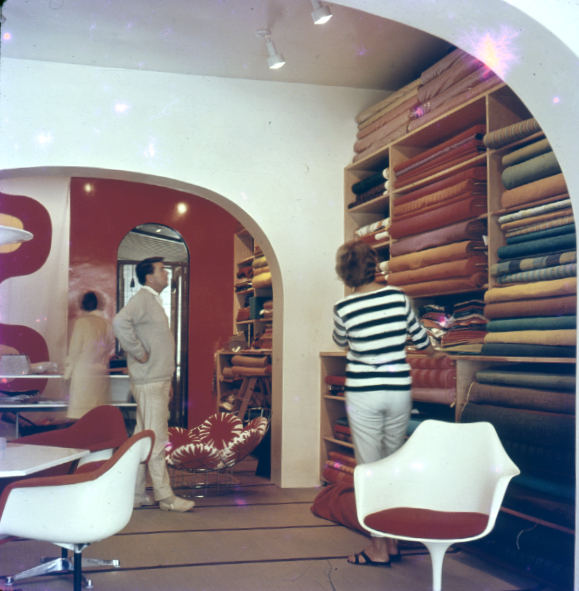
Peter Hall, Marion Hall Best's design shop, Woollahra, Sydney, about 1966.

Peter Hall befriended and supported many Sydney artists including sculptor Clement Meadmore, whom he had hoped to commission to create the courtyard sculpture for UNSW's Goldstein College, and was friends with the celebrated Sydney photographer Max Dupain, whom he commissioned to record the completed Opera House. But perhaps Hall's most important commission was that of local artist John Coburn to design the huge stage curtain tapestries for the Opera Theatre and Drama Theatre. The ‘Curtain of the Sun’ and ‘Curtain of the Moon’, woven at Aubusson in France in the early 1970s, are among the many significant legacies of Hall's seven years at the helm of the Opera House design completion.

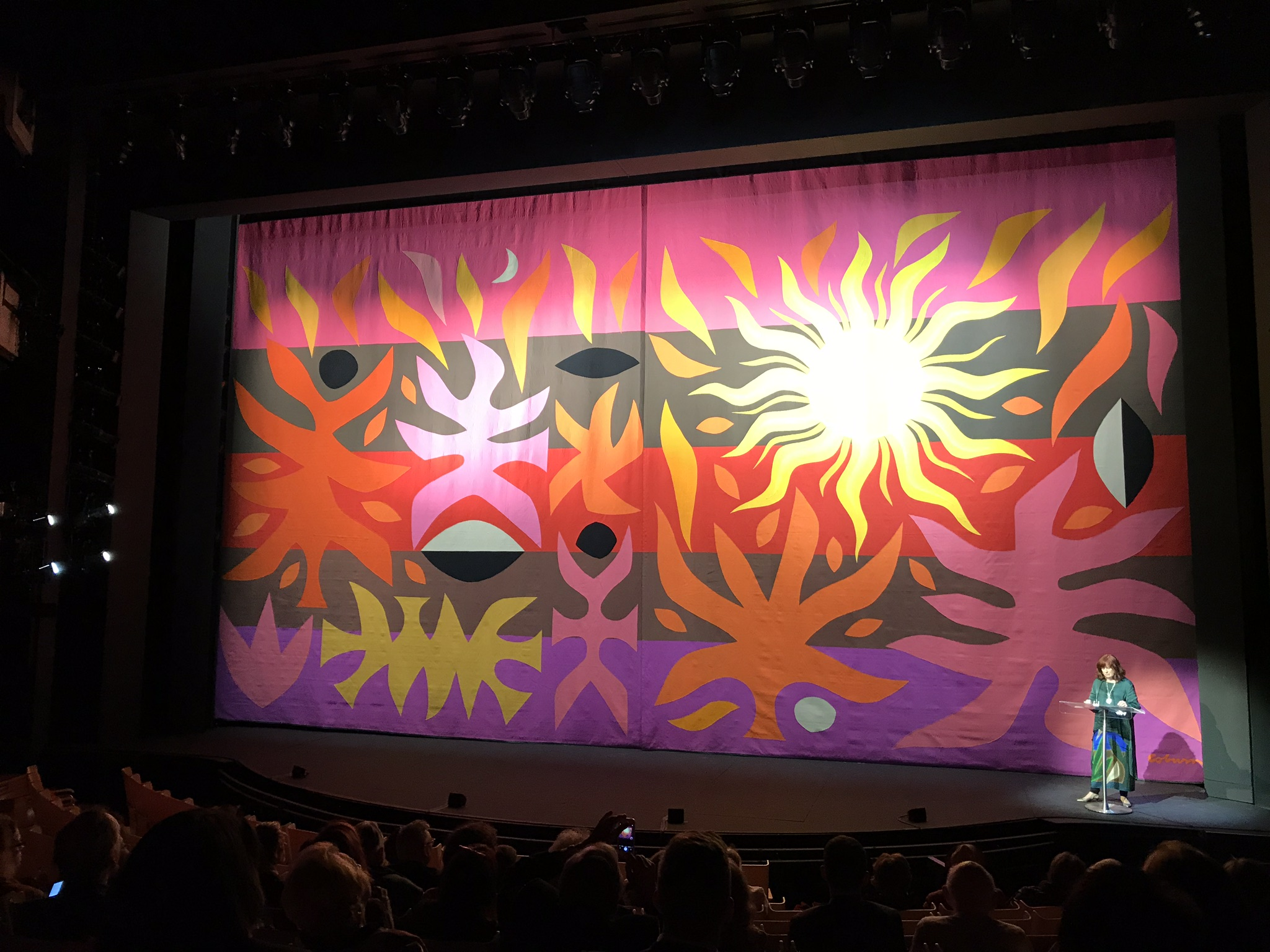
John Coburn, 'Curtain of the Sun' tapestry. Designed for the Sydney Opera House Opera Theatre stage in 1970 and shown here when hung temporarily in the Concert Hall in 2019.

== Bibliography ==
- Boyd, Robin. 'Now it can Never be Architecture', Life, 24 July 1967, pp 56–59.
- Croker, Alan. Respecting the Vision: Sydney Opera House – a Conservation Management Plan, Sydney, 4th edition, Sydney Opera House, 2017.
- Hall, Peter. Epilogue, 'Function is not a "Dirty" Word' in Michael Baume, The Sydney Opera House Affair, Thomas Nelson, Sydney, 1967, pp 109–117.
- Hall, Peter. 'The Design of the Concert Hall of the Sydney Opera House', Journal and Proceedings, Royal Society of New South Wales, vol 106, 1973, pp 54–69.
- Hall, Peter. Report, Sydney Opera House: the Design Approach to the Building with Recommendations on its Conservation, Sydney Opera House Trust, 1990.
- Jones, Peter. Ove Arup: Masterbuilder of the Twentieth Century, Yale University Press, London, 2006.
- Murray, David. The Saga of the Sydney Opera House, Spon Press, London, 2004.
- Pitt, Helen. The House, Allen & Unwin, Sydney, 2018
- Sowden, Harry (ed). Sydney Opera House Glass Walls, John Sands, Sydney, 1972.
- Watson, Anne. 'After Utzon: Peter Hall and the Trip that Changed the Sydney Opera House', paper, Cultural Crossroads: the 26th Annual SAHANZ Conference, University of Auckland, New Zealand, 2–5 July 2009.
- Watson, Anne. 'A Tilted Tale: How the Sydney Opera House Got its Seats', Double Dialogues, 13, Summer 2010, https://www.doubledialogues.com/article/a-tilted-tale-how-the-sydney-opera-house-got-its-seats/
- Watson, Anne. 'Conspiracy or Coincidence: the Curious Case of the Disappearing Model', paper, Audience: the 28th International SAHANZ Conference, Brisbane, 7–10 July 2011.
- Watson, Anne. 'Divided Loyalties: Peter Hall, Philip Parsons and the Dilemma of Utzon's Return', Fabrications, vol 22, no 2, December 2012, pp 164–185.
- Watson, Anne. '"That Immense and Complicated Thing": Peter Hall and the Challenge of a Career' in A Watson (ed), Building a Masterpiece: the Sydney Opera House, 2nd edition (SOH 40th Anniversary), Powerhouse Publishing, Sydney 2013, pp 182–199.
- Watson, Anne. 'Peter Hall and the Sydney Opera House: the "Lost" Years 1966–70', PhD thesis, University of Sydney, 2013. https://ses.library.usyd.edu.au/handle/2123/13246?show=full
- Watson, Anne. 'The Poisoned Chalice', Meanjin, Summer 2015.https://meanjin.com.au/essays/the-poisoned-chalice/
- Watson, Anne. The Poisoned Chalice: Peter Hall and the Sydney Opera House, OpusSOH, Sydney, 2017.
- Watson, Anne. 'Sydney Opera House' in H Lewi and P Goad, Australian Modern, Thames & Hudson, Melbourne, 2019, pp 148–151.
- Webber, Peter. Peter Hall, Architect: The Phantom of the Opera House, Watermark Press, Boorowa, NSW, 2012.
- Webber, Peter. 'Peter Hall' in P Goad and J Willis (eds), Encyclopedia of Australian Architecture, Cambridge University Press, Melbourne, 2012, pp 308–309.
- Woolley, Ken. Reviewing the Performance: the Design of the Sydney Opera House, Watermark Press, Boorawa, NSW, 2010.
