= El Alamein Fountain =

El Alamein Memorial Fountain
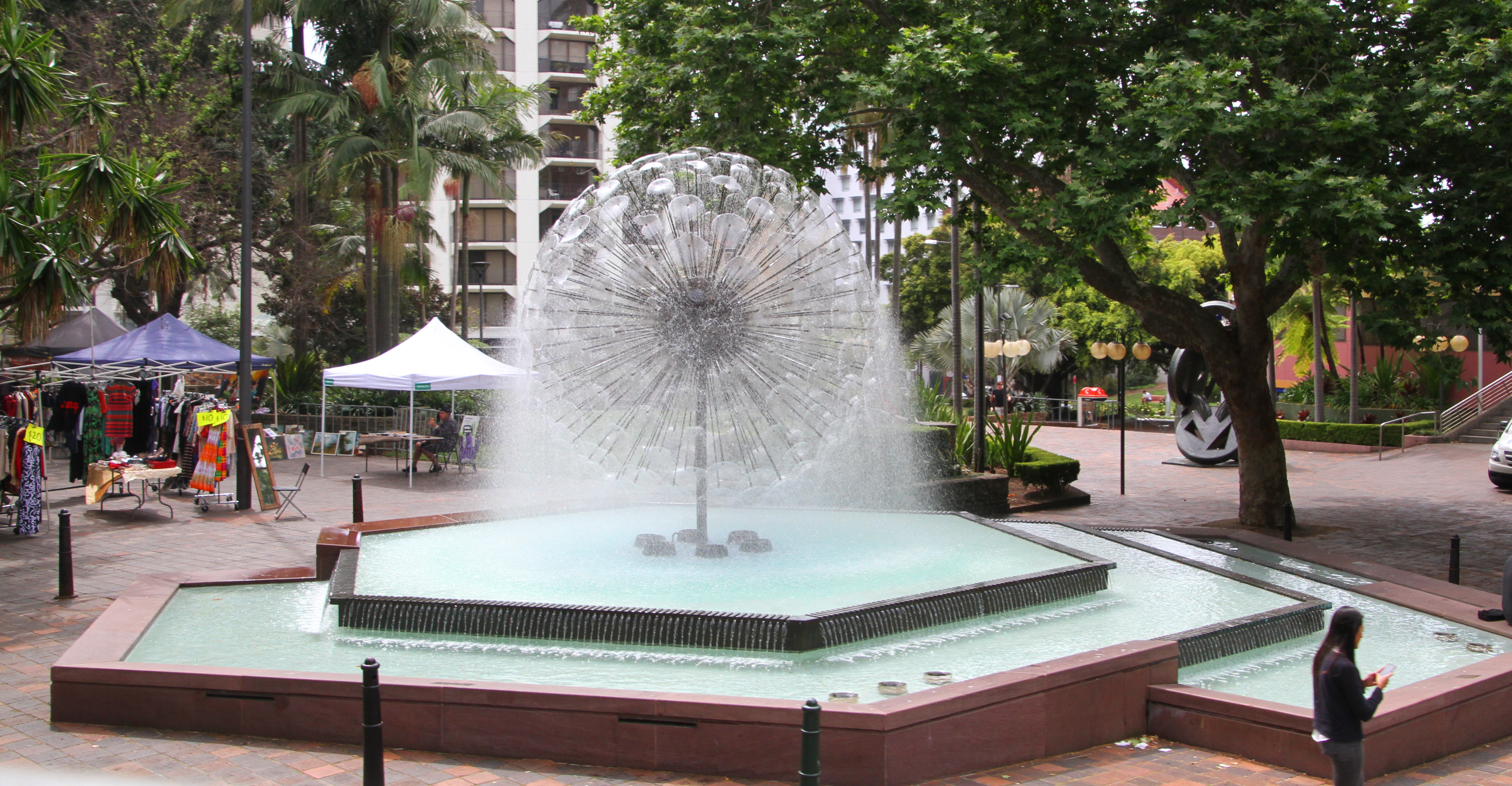
- El Alamein Memorial Fountain

- Location within Sydney Location within Australia
- 33.8729°S 151.2250°E
- Location: Macleay Street, Kings Cross, City of Sydney, New South Wales, Australia

History
- Built: 1959–1961
- Built for: Returned Sailors, Soldiers and Airmen's Imperial League of Australia

Site notes
- Architects: Robert Woodward; Phill Taranto
- Owner: City of Sydney

New South Wales Heritage Register
- Official name: El Alamein Memorial Fountain; Fitzroy Gardens Group; Kings Cross Fountain; King's Cross Fountain
- Type: State heritage (built)
- Designated: 14 January 2011
- Reference no.: 1847
- Type: War Memorial
- Category: Monuments and Memorials
- Awards: Civic Design Award, 1964

The El Alamein Memorial Fountain is a heritage-listed fountain and war memorial located at Macleay Street in the inner Sydney locale of Kings Cross, New South Wales, Australia. It was designed by the Australian architects Robert Woodward and Phill Taranto as employed by architectural firm Woodward and Woodward. The fountain was built from 1959 to 1961. It is also known as El Alamein Fountain, Fitzroy Gardens Group, Kings Cross Fountain and King's Cross Fountain. It was added to the New South Wales State Heritage Register on 14 January 2011. The El Alamein Fountain was commissioned as a memorial to soldiers who died in 1942 during World War II in two battles at El Alamein, Egypt.

== War memorial ==
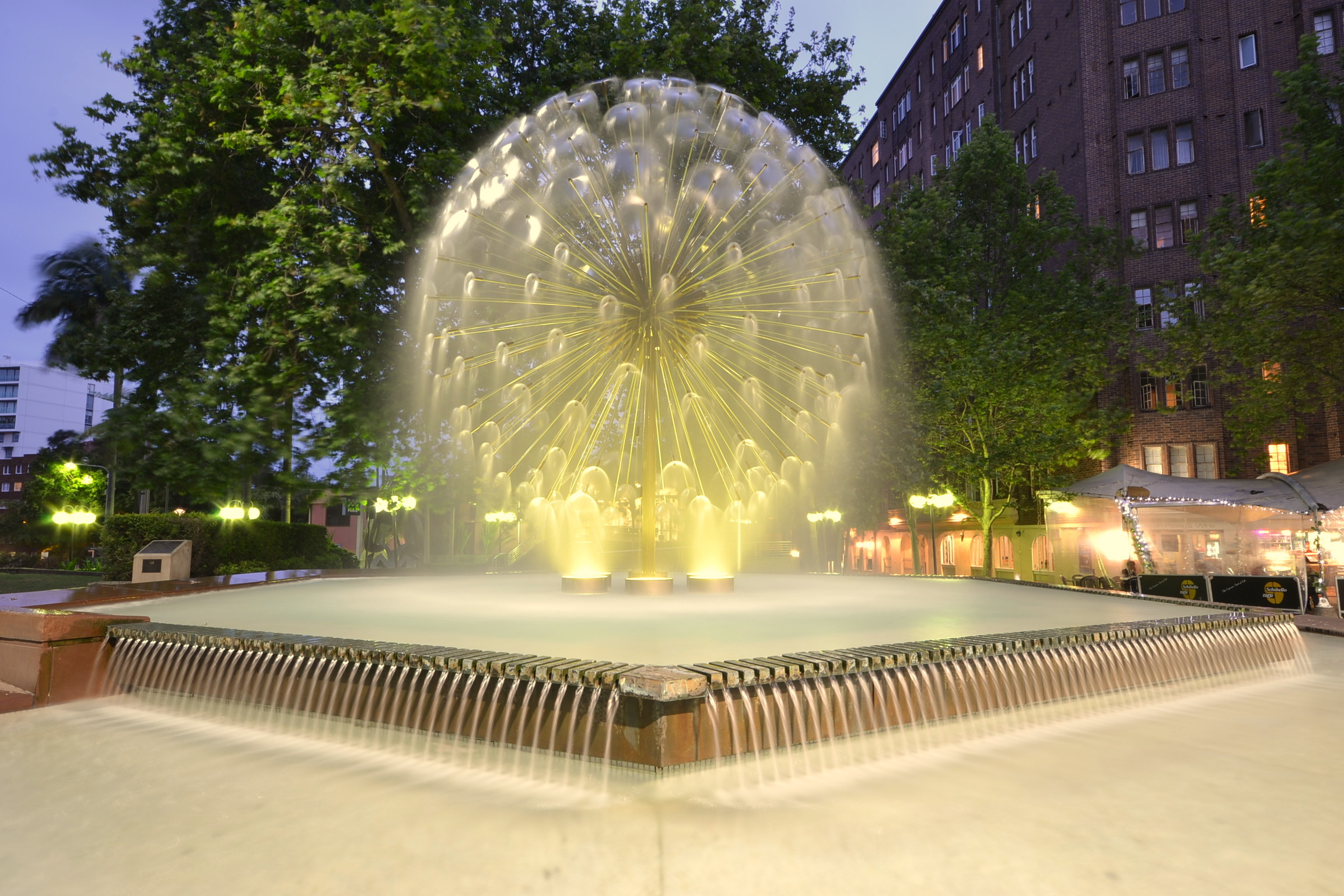
Night photo of El Alamein Memorial Fountain

The Australian 9th Division fought in both the first (July 1942) and second (November 1942) battles of El Alamein during World War II. Both were important for the course of the war. They halted the advance of Axis forces into Egypt and routed them, and are considered a turning point in the Western Desert Campaign. The El Alamein Fountain in Sydney commemorates the Australian army's roles in the North Africa campaign in general, and the two El Alamein battles in particular.

=== Competition for the El Alamein Memorial Fountain ===
Woodward & Taranto won the main prize of £500 in 1959 in the City Council fountains competition. The competition had been organised by the Sydney Fountains Committee, which was established in September 1958. Its aim was to install fountains in public places in Sydney to enhance their natural beauty and to commemorate families, individuals and organisations. A Designs Committee was responsible for design competitions for fountains in a number of selected sites, such as the Fitzroy Gardens in Kings Cross, Moore Park, Customs House Square, and Macquarie Place. The competition for the Fitzroy Gardens fountain was assessed by a panel of architects (Max Collard, President of the RAIA (NSW Chapter), and Professor Leslie Wilkinson), sculptors (Douglas Annand), and the City Council.

The Committee's design brief for the fountain was: "The fountain shall cost not more than £10,000 complete. Whilst the fountain is not to be a war memorial in the generally accepted sense, it is nevertheless contemplated that Fitzroy Gardens will become a local assembly point on Anzac Day and the fountain will be known as a war memorial fountain." This association between the park and a war memorial began in October 1957 when the Kings Cross Sub-Branch of the Returned Sailors, Soldiers and Airmen's Imperial League of Australia approached the Council about the possibility of changing the name of the park to El Alamein Park. In December 1958 the Council resolved to hold a public competition for designs for a fountain to be provided in Fitzroy Gardens that may also serve as a memorial.

The Australasian Post explained further: 'The plan for the fountain was suggested by the King's Cross RSL, when they asked that a place be set aside for memorial services "because older servicemen are finding it very difficult to get to and from the Memorial gates opposite the wharves in Woolloomooloo".

=== The designer ===
Robert (Bob) Woodward (1923–2010) together with Phill Taranto was commissioned to build the fountain in 1959. Woodward, himself an Army veteran, was 36 at the time and had studied architecture at Sydney University, and worked in Finland. The structure was completed in 1961 and officially opened by Harry Jensen, Lord Mayor of Sydney. The fountain made such a name for Woodward and the firm that he went on to design many others, and his fountains are his best-known works.

=== The design ===
Woodward's Modernist design has been variously described as looking like a blown thistle, or dandelion. The sculpture is made of bronze with brass pipes. The small-nozzled spray heads make the sphere-shaped spray very fine, and sensitive to air movement. The fountain sits on a hexagonal base, where the water cascades down three levels. It is illuminated at night.

==== Reception of the fountain since completion ====
Tom Heath's appraisal of El Alamein in 1962 captured the excitement of the moment:

'El Alamein fountain at Kings Cross has fulfilled beyond expectation the promise of the original design. Surely no one can pass this dandelion of water gleaming in the sun or glowing with its own internal light at night and resist its fascination. The bold formality of the sphere catches one's attention immediately, yet this first impression of simplicity gives way at once to a fascinating complexity. The sphere is not a sphere but a mass of saucer shaped facets. The facets are not saucer-shaped but complex curves deformed by wind and gravity. There are transparencies, reflections and rainbow effects in the curtain of spray. By the time one has observed this much, one is obstructing the traffic and being regarded with contempt by old men who have been studying it all comfortably from benches for hours'.

El Alamein Fountain won the inaugural RAIA NSW Chapter Civic Design Award in 1964. Woodward explained 'We had nominated it for design awards but it was considered not to be architecture and so it didn't get an award. The NSW Chapter of the Royal Institute of Architects then instigated a new award, the Civic Design Award, because of the El Alamein Fountain'.

"A fountain of great beauty", said the judges, in presenting the new NSW Chapter of the RAIA Civic Design Award to architects Woodward, Tarantino and Wallace for the breathtaking El Alamein Fountain at King's Cross, Sydney. The jury considered there could hardly be a more appropriate recipient of this first Civic Design Award'.

An article in the popular magazine Australasian Post in 1967 stated:

'It is probably one of the most beautiful man-made things in the land. . . Since Sydney's beautiful King's Cross fountain was first turned on, little over six years ago, people from all parts of the world have asked, "Who dreamed it up?" And they're still asking. The designer is an Australian, Mr Robert Raymond Woodward, and the fountain has made him famous. Today he is recognized as the world's top fountain designer. Last month he came back from San Francisco, where he supervised the installation of a fountain built to his own design. Night and day, people come to take pictures of his King's Cross fountain. . . Everybody seems to know about the fountain and it is now a recognised easy-to-find meeting place because "anybody will tell you where it is". Mr C.S. Garth, Sydney's Director of Parks, said, 'We knew the fountain was original, that it was unique. We knew it would create a lot of interest. But I don't think anyone realised just how much interest it would create. Overseas visitors come here, take color pictures, and take them home, Now everyone seems to want a fountain like ours'. . . Mr Garth said the original cost of the fountain was $32,028 and the annual maintenance bill was about $3248. Cost of electricity to operate the floodlights and water-circulating mechanism absorbs $3048 of the maintenance allotment.'

Freeland's Architecture in Australia, 1967 stated:

'Fountains were particularly popular and prestigious because of their patent luxury after nearly sixty years when circumstances had demanded a practical return for any money spent. Only one of the many fountains erected throughout Australia was really successful - and it could hardly have been more so. The El Alamein fountain designed by Woodward and Taranto and erected at Kings Cross in Sydney in 1961 is a splendid sculpture in water. Its ephemeral ever-changing ever-remaining lightness dances tantalizingly in the sunshine or turns the reflections of gaudy neon lights into jewels at night. Its poetry was a sculptural breakthrough not only in Australia but in the world'.

Carol Henty wrote for The Bulletin in 1978:

'It is to Sydney what Eros is to London. The inner city heads for it on New Year's Eve. Pranksters have dyed it green, put soap bubbles through it and bathed nude in it. It's sometimes called the dandelion. Or the puff ball. Or the porcupine. Officially it's the El Alamein Fountain in Fitzroy Gardens, Kings Cross - the first fountain designed by Sydney's Bob Woodward, opened 18 years ago but with a touch of magic that's still potent. At last count 72 American companies were manufacturing it in seven different sizes and exporting it worldwide, making it probably the world's most copied fountain'.

In an interview with Woodward in 1996, architectural historians Paul Alan Johnson and Susan Lorne Johnson stated, 'Australians really seem to have taken the fountain to their hearts... Australians don't usually seem to be overly enthusiastic about their sculpture or their architecture... The fountain is now an icon in Australia and internationally admired'. 'The El Alamein Fountain represents an important technological innovation in fountain design, and has been much replicated throughout the world.'

=== Cultural impact ===
The fountain won Woodward the New South Wales Institute of Architects Civic Design Award in 1964. Over the years, its iconic shape has made it a well-known landmark that has been imitated by other builders.

As the focal point of the Kings Cross area, the fountain often serves as a meeting place. From the 1970s through the 1990s, the surrounding plaza in Fitzroy Gardens was a well-known gathering spot for runaways and street youth, and served as a location for young street-based sex workers and their clients.

== Description ==
'This fountain has a globe-like shape, with a diameter of 12 ft 6 in (3.81 m) and comprises 211 radially arranged "stalks" fitted to a hollow metal globe, itself placed on top of a brass pipe column with a length of 10 ft (3.05 m) and a diameter of 4 in. (10 cm). The central globe is made of cast brass [in fact bronze, according to CMP] and its diameter measures 46 cm. Each stalk consists of a tube 1.5 inch [2 cm] thick at the base and reducing to 0.5 inch [0.8 cm] at the outer end. A specially constructed nozzle has been fitted to each of these extremities. . . [There are] three terraced pools made of concrete and covered with white mosaic glass tiles. The perimeter coping is faced with quartzite and the two upper pools' spillways are formed by bronze dentils. The water is pumped through the line strainer - at a rate of 500 gallons (2,270 litres) per minute and a pressure of 22 lb. [10 kg] per square inch - up to the central sphere where it emerges from each of the 211 nozzles as a thin 18 inch [45 cm] disc of water. These disks of water merge and create the impression of a huge thistledown [or dandelion]. The water from the nozzles falls first to the top pool and then runs between the spillway dentils from pool to pool. Through nine glory hole outlets and underground pipes the water returns into the screening baskets and back to the tanks so that it can circulate again.'. The glory holes compensate almost exactly for the consecutive reduction in weir length from pool to pool. Each glory hole drains the equivalent of ~32 troughs. This means that the weirs draining the pools and all 9 glory holes have identical flow.

The fountain sits above the top pool of a series of four pools, set among cobblestone paving near the south-western edge of Fitzroy Gardens. As the land is sloping gently eastward, its design responds to the site, with successive pools lower down this slope towards the east. The top pool in which the fountain apparatus is mounted is hexagonal in form. Lower pools reflect this form but are larger, with expanded dimensions. A series of spillway dentils in bronze direct water down from pool to pool through a fine series of "teeth" which make a very precise noise, helping dull traffic noise.

=== Plaques ===
Below ground to its immediate north-east is the fountain's pump room, which houses its operative mechanisms. Also to the north east of the fountain is a plinth with two plaques which read:

THE EL ALAMEIN MEMORIAL FOUNTAIN

THIS FOUNTAIN WAS ERECTED IN COMMEMORATION OF
THE DEEDS OF THE NINTH DIVISION
AUSTRALIAN IMPERIAL FORCES IN WORLD WAR II
BY
THE COUNCIL OF THE CITY OF SYDNEY
AND PLACED IN OPERATION BY THE RIGHT HONOURABLE THE LORD MAYOR OF SYDNEY ALDERMAN H.F. JENSEN
ON 18.11.61

E.W. ADAMS
TOWN CLERK

— Commemoration Plaque, 1961

THIS FOUNTAIN WAS DESIGNED BY
AND CONSTRUCTED UNDER
THE SUPERVISION OF
WOODWARD & TARANTO ARCHITECTS

— Designers Plaque, 1961

The complete fountain head above the waterline and stalks were originally manufactured by Eric L. Williams under the supervision of Robert Woodward.

=== Lighting installation ===
At night, this lighted fountain makes the impression of a display of fireworks bursting asunder. The light emanates from six reflector lamps of 500 W, mounted under the water-level of the upper basin. These lamps are placed around the main delivery pipe, in a circle with a diameter of some 1.20 m. Each lamp is mounted in a metal cylinder with a clear Pyrex glass cover and a bronze-coloured spun metal shielding ring which projects several inches above the water level. For maintenance purposes the cylinders can be reached from the equipment room under the central pool. This room houses a 25 h.p. electric motor, a 3-inch pump, a 3-inch strainer, switchboards and a set of three stainless steel screening baskets. Below the floor is a concrete tank of 3,000 gallons (ca 13 cu. m.). The operation of the fountain is controlled by a time switch.'

=== Other site observations ===
Two London plane trees, Platanus x acerifolia (syn. P. x hispanica) dating from the time when the fountain was completed are considered to be of significance.

The curtilage for the SHR listing is in the shape of a triangle with its three corners enclosing the three main viewing cones towards the fountain, from Darlinghurst Road, from Macleay Street north and from the Police Station. Within this curtilage are many non-significant or intrusive urban design elements including: roads and traffic signals; a Telstra telephone booth; a glass enclosed bus shelter; a tourist sign-post showing directions / distance to numerous world cities; a light post with multiple circular lights; a large bronze sculpture "Angled Wheels of Fortune" designed and donated by property developer Dennis Wolanski in 1988; a cafe with large awnings and cafe furniture; and a significant amount of recently planted vegetation. Although worthwhile in their own right, many of these elements interfere with views towards the fountain and should be repositioned when possible.

== Heritage listing ==
As at 28 October 2010, The El Alamein Memorial Fountain is of State significance as a spectacular fountain and outstanding work of modernist design in water which has been copied all over the world. Throughout the decades of the 1960s and 1970s it was an icon of Sydney, rivalling the Sydney Harbour Bridge and the Sydney Opera House for the frequency with which it was represented in tourism imagery. Aesthetically it is rare in NSW as a local adaptation of the organic school of Scandinavian architectural design and as an example of the application of modernist design technology to fountain design.

The El Alamein Memorial Fountain is of State significance as a war memorial to the Australian soldiers of the 9th Division who fought near the Egyptian town of El Alamein in two battles which helped turn the course of World War II towards victory for the Allies. It is also of State significance for its associations with its designer Bob Woodward, a World War II veteran whose career was consequently shifted into national and international prominence as a fountain designer largely because of its popular and critical success. It is rare as a war memorial in NSW which commemorates a battle rather than the loss of individual members of the armed forces. It is also unusual because its beauty as a fountain has historically almost overwhelmed its solemn function a war memorial.

El Alamein Memorial Fountain was listed on the New South Wales State Heritage Register on 14 January 2011 having satisfied the following criteria.

The place is important in demonstrating the course, or pattern, of cultural or natural history in New South Wales.

The El Alamein Memorial Fountain is of State historical heritage significance as a war memorial to the battles fought by Australian soldiers near the Egyptian town of El Alamein which helped turn the course of World War II towards victory for the Allies. The Australians paid a fearful price for their involvement, suffering almost 6,000 casualties between July and November 1942.

The place has a strong or special association with a person, or group of persons, of importance of cultural or natural history of New South Wales's history.

The El Alamein Memorial Fountain is of State significance for its historical associations with the Australian soldiers of the 9th Division who fought near the Egyptian town of El Alamein in two battles which helped turn the course of World War II. It is also of State significance for its associations with its designer Bob Woodward, a World War II veteran whose career as a fountain designer was consequently reoriented into national and international prominence largely because of its popular and critical success.

The place is important in demonstrating aesthetic characteristics and/or a high degree of creative or technical achievement in New South Wales.

The El Alamein Memorial Fountain is of State aesthetic significance as a spectacular fountain and outstanding work of modernist design in water which has been copied all over the world. It was described by architectural historian Max Freeland as "a splendid sculpture in water. Its ephemeral ever-changing ever-remaining lightness dances tantalizingly in the sunshine or turns the reflections of gaudy neon lights into jewels at night. Its poetry was a sculptural breakthrough not only in Australia but in the world". Throughout the decades of the 1960s and 1970s it was an icon of Sydney, rivalling the Sydney Harbour Bridge and the Sydney Opera House for the frequency with which it was represented in tourism imagery. Described as "an important technological innovation in fountain design" (, the NSW chapter of the Institute of Architects created a new design category for it, the "Civic Design Award" of which it became the inaugural winner in 1964.

The place possesses uncommon, rare or endangered aspects of the cultural or natural history of New South Wales.

The El Alamein Memorial Fountain is of State significance for its rarity as a war memorial in NSW which commemorates a battle rather than the loss of individual members of the armed forces. It is also unusual because its beauty as a fountain has historically almost overwhelmed its solemn function as a war memorial.

The place is important in demonstrating the principal characteristics of a class of cultural or natural places/environments in New South Wales.

The El Alamein Memorial Fountain is of State significance as an example of internationally outstanding fountain design and representative of excellence in Australian modernist design of the mid twentieth century.

== Similar fountains ==
The overall design and hydraulic engineering of the El Alamein fountain was used in a number of other fountains designed by Robert Woodward, but also widely copied by many other fountain designers in the decades since it was first conceived.

=== Designed by Robert Woodward ===
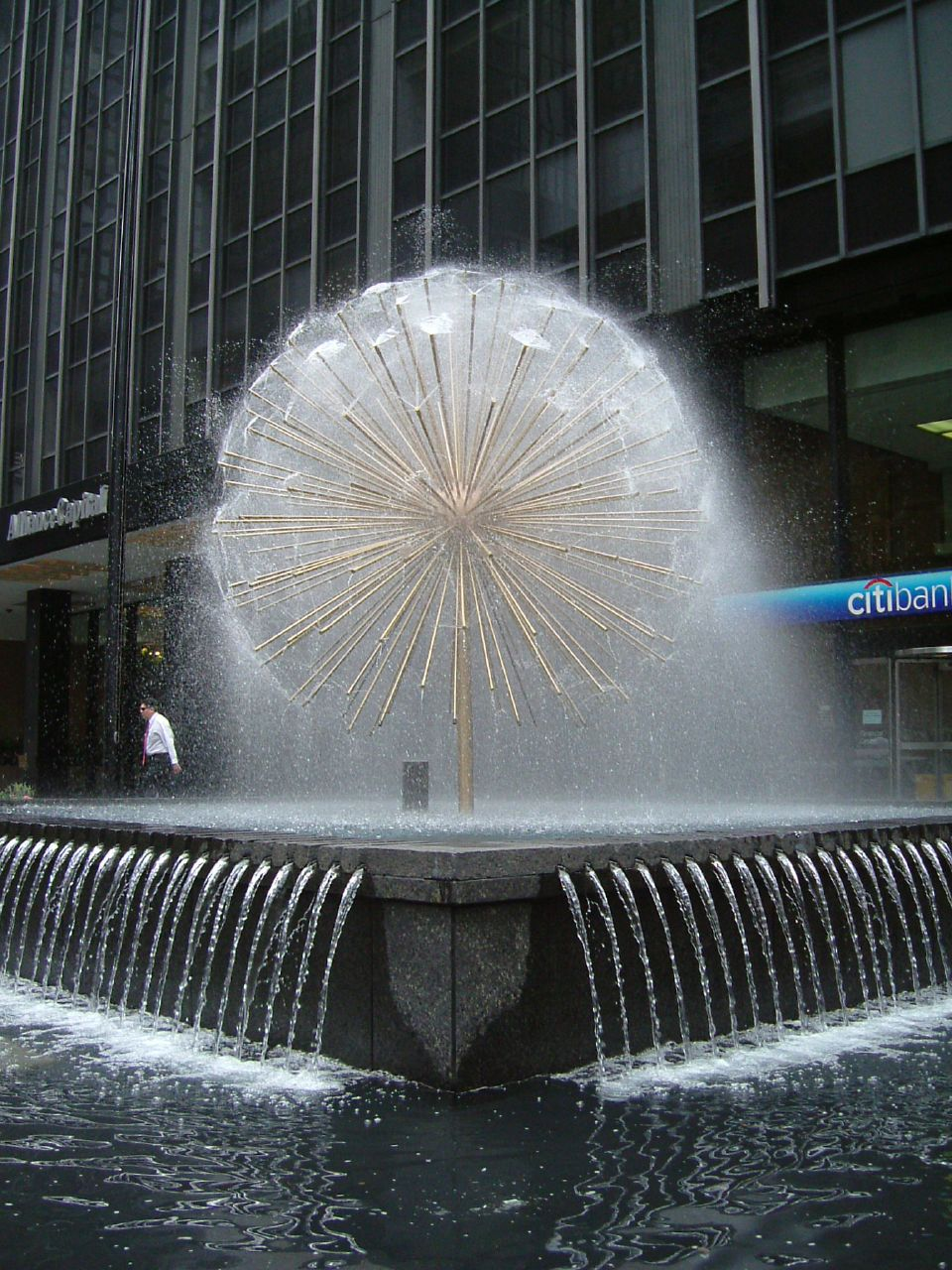
1345 Avenue of Americas Fountain by Robert Woodward, c.1969

Woodward used a similar design and base for the Dandelion Fountain in the plaza of 1345 Avenue of the Americas, New York in 1969, and later demolished in 2019.

At the Tupperware world headquarters at 14901 South Orange Blossom Trail, Orlando, Florida, a similar fountain was installed in the building forecourt, also designed by Woodward (1970). The fountain was dedicated to the millions of independent sellers around the world, and known as the Gaylin Olson Friendship Fountain. The headquarters complex was closed in 2022.

The Berger Fountain (1975) in Loring Park, Minneapolis is an approved copy, funded by Ben Berger, a former parks commissioner who saw the original. This copy was built by Woodward in Australia and shipped to Minnesota, where it was installed on a base (1974–75) that he approved.

=== Similar fountains designed by others ===
The Ferrier Fountain built in 1972 at the Christchurch Town Hall, New Zealand has similar design and water forms built by British company Ustigate.

A similar fountain can be found on the Allen Parkway on the Buffalo Bayou, Houston, Texas officially named the Gus S. Wortham Memorial Fountain, but also known as the 'Dandelion Fountain' was directly inspired by the El Alamein Fountain. It was donated to the City of Houston in 1978 by the Wortham Foundation and the American General Life Insurance company and designed by Houston architect and Rice University professor William T. Cannady.

A similar fountain called the 'Dandelion Fountain' located in the centre of a roundabout at the intersection of Newtown Road and Corporation Street (A444) in Nuneaton in the United Kingdom. In 2016 it was voted 'UK Roundabout of the Year'.

A similar but smaller hemisphere fountain can be found in a public square on Wolności Street, Szczytna, in south-western Poland.

The 'Peacock Fountain' (Påfuglfontenen) installed in 1989 in Johanne Dybwads Plass was designed by architects Lund & Slaatto has a similar style in a hemisphere shape, sits in a public square next to the National Theatre (Nationaltheatret) in Oslo, Norway.

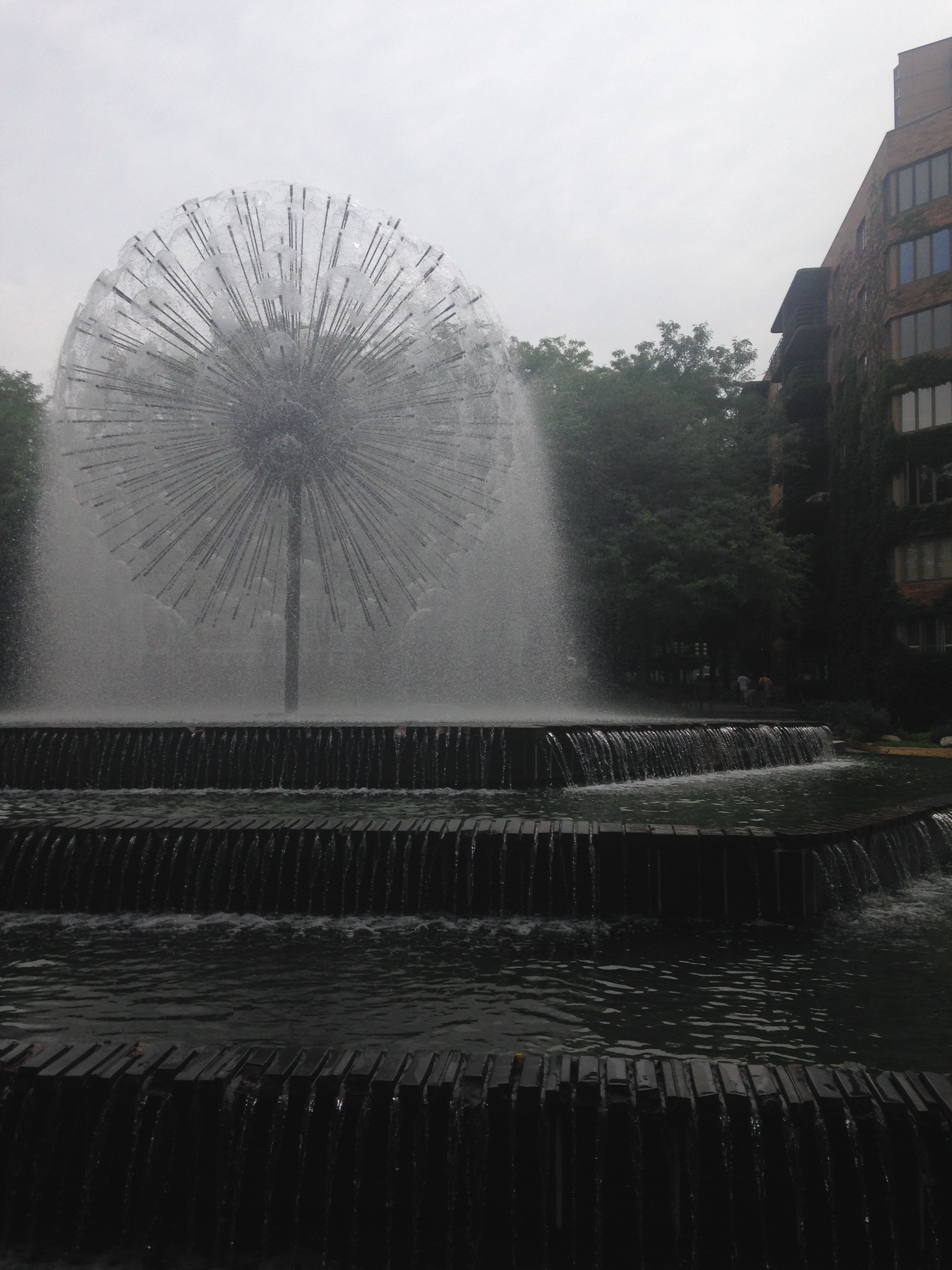
Loring Berger Park, Minneapolis, USA

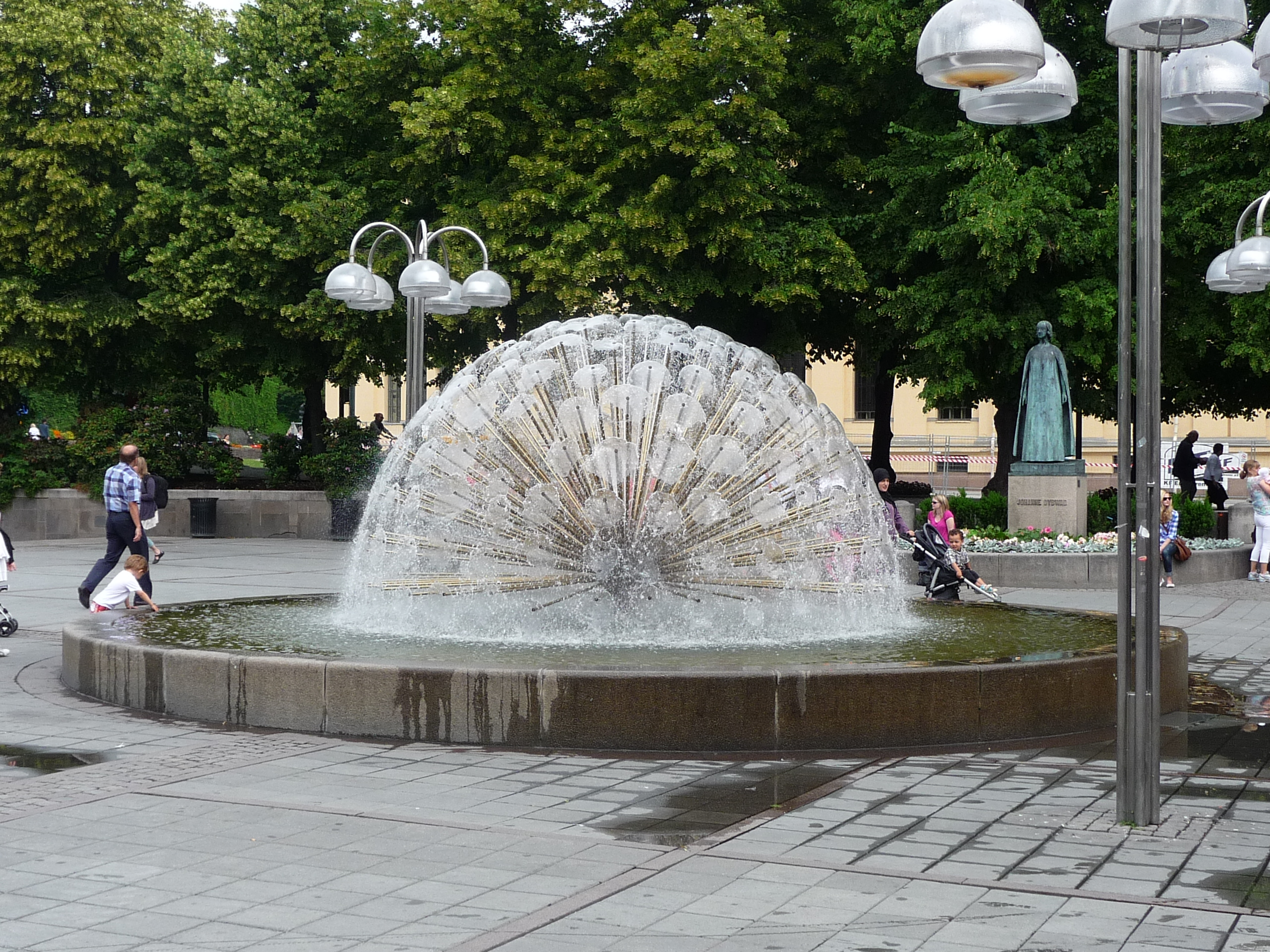
'Peacock Fountain' (Påfuglfontenen), Oslo, Norway

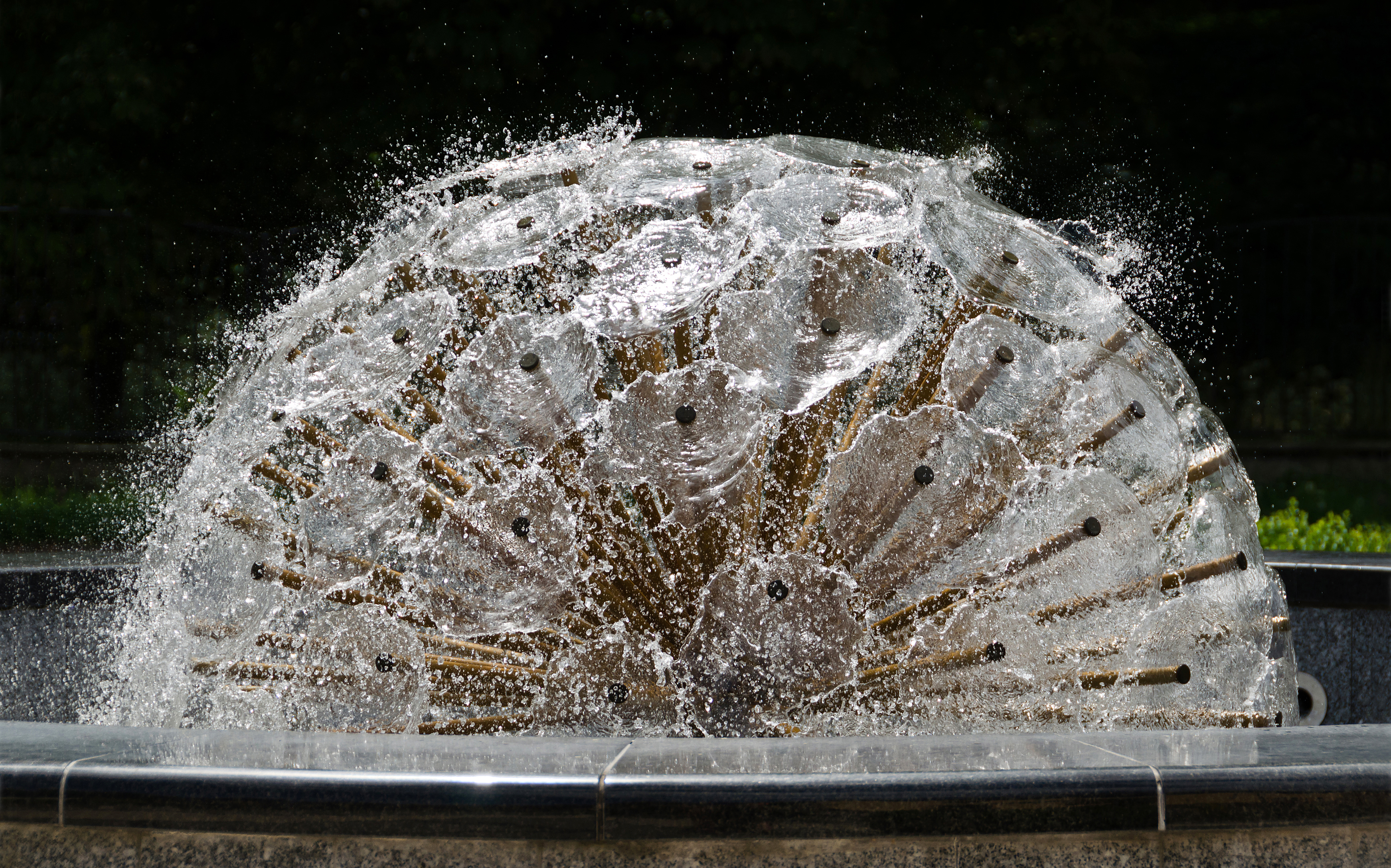
Comparable fountain in Szczytna, Poland (2014)

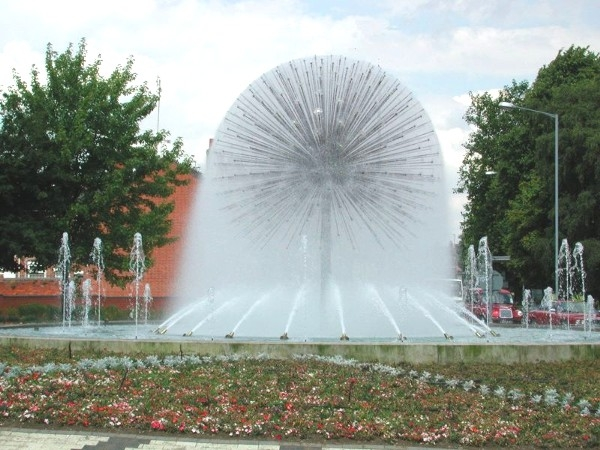
Roundabout fountain, Nuneaton, UK

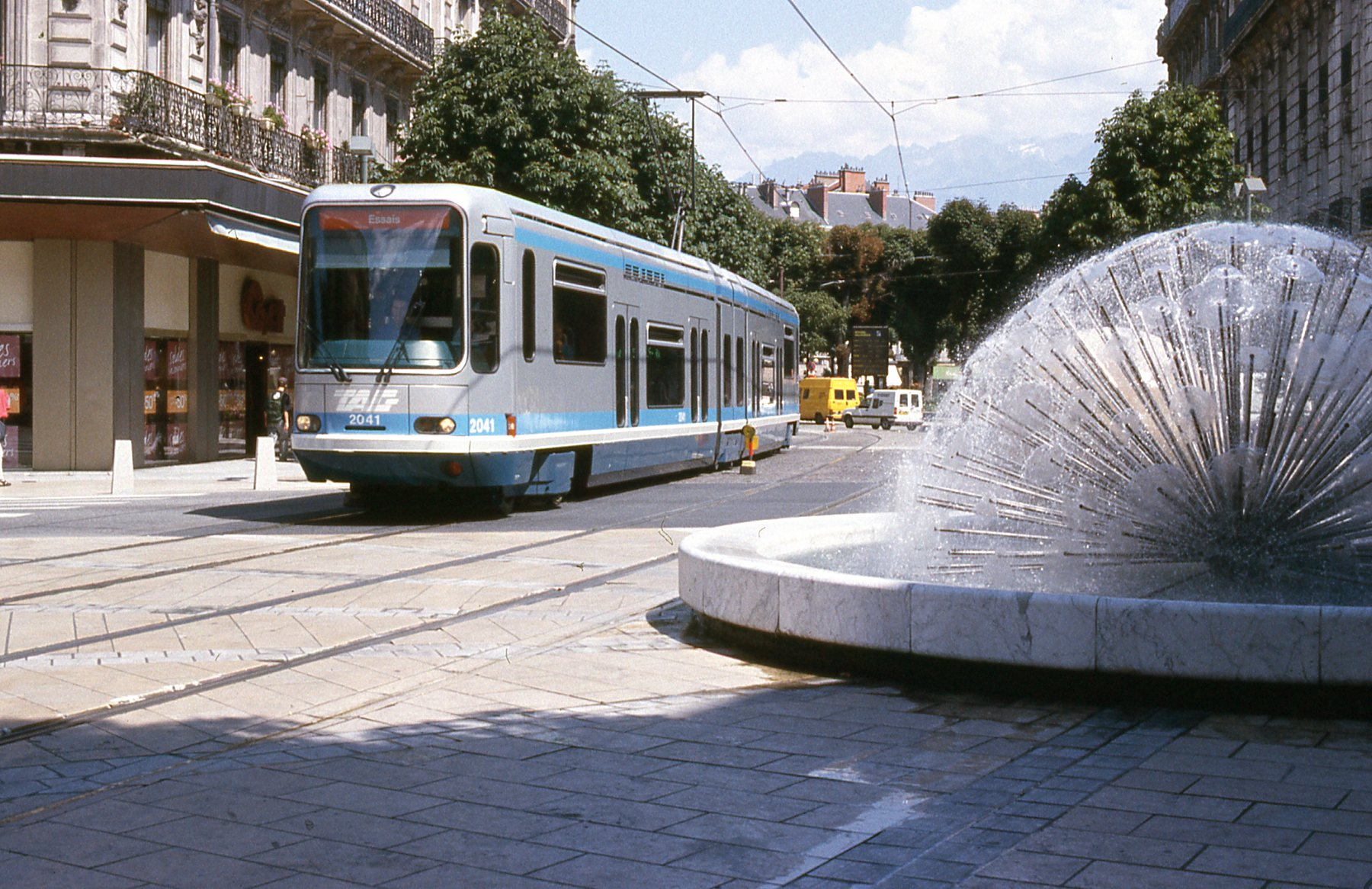
Grenoble, France

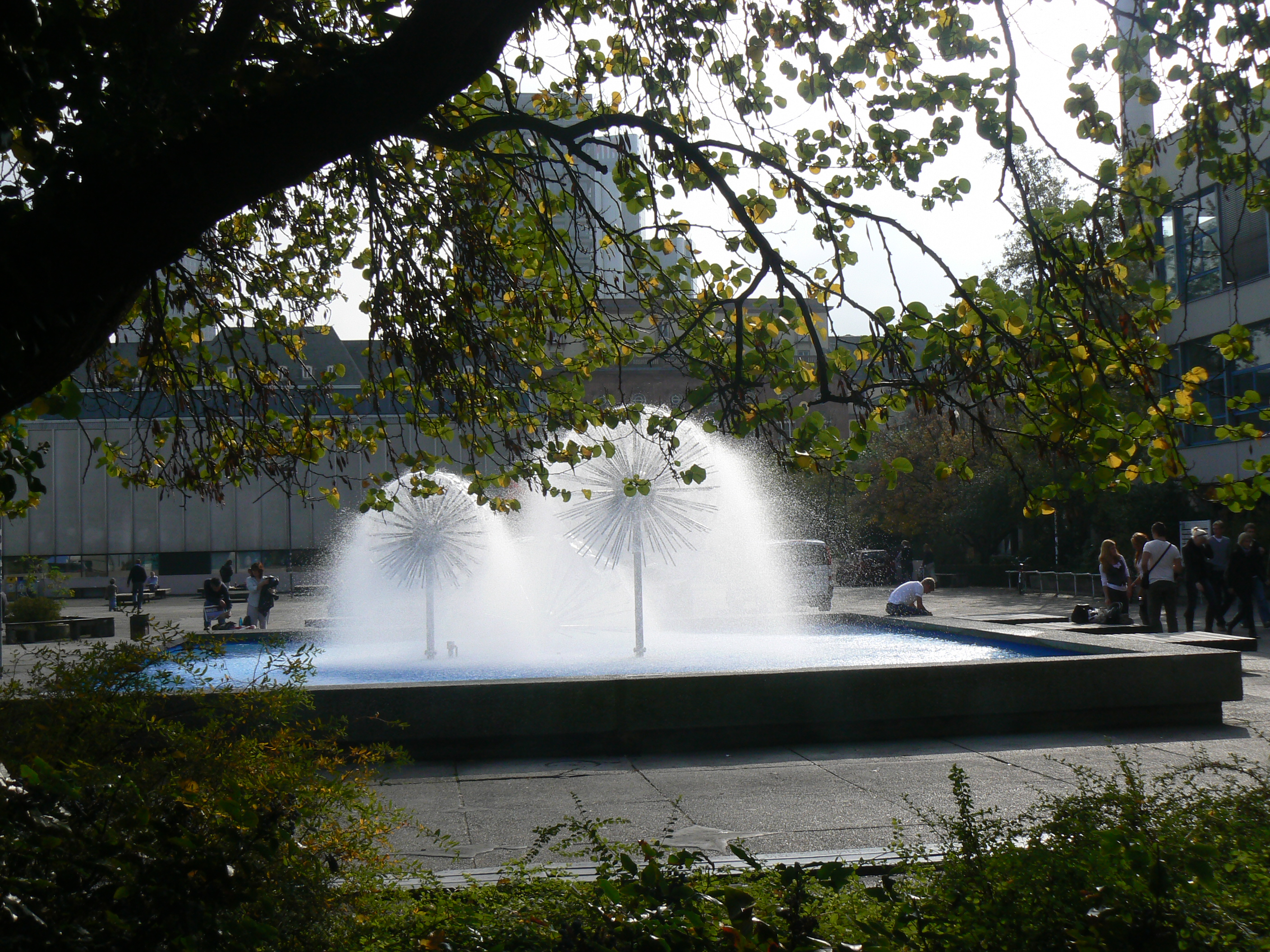
Campus Bockenheim, Goethe University Frankfurt, Germany

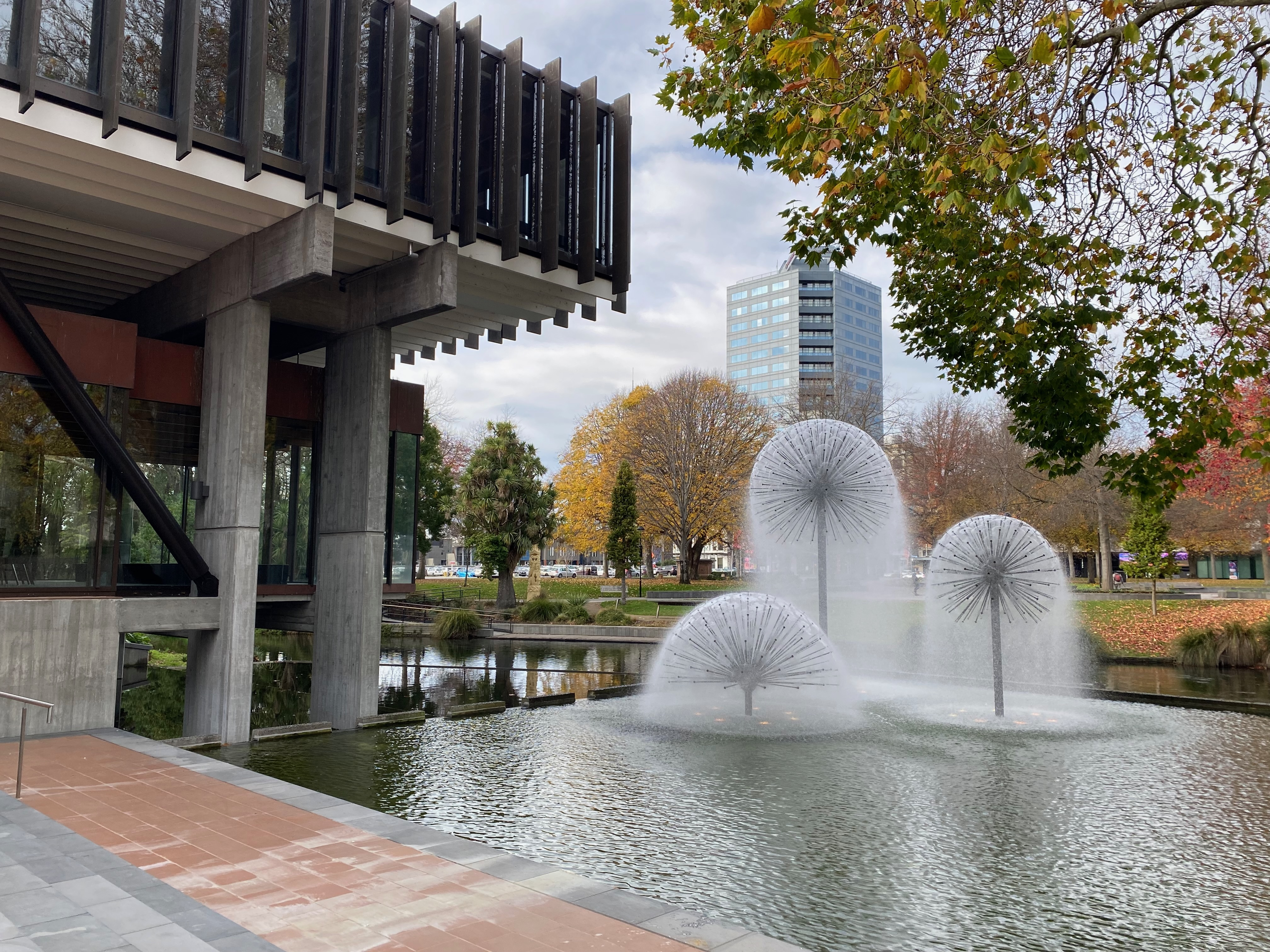
Ferrier Fountain, Christchurch, New Zealand

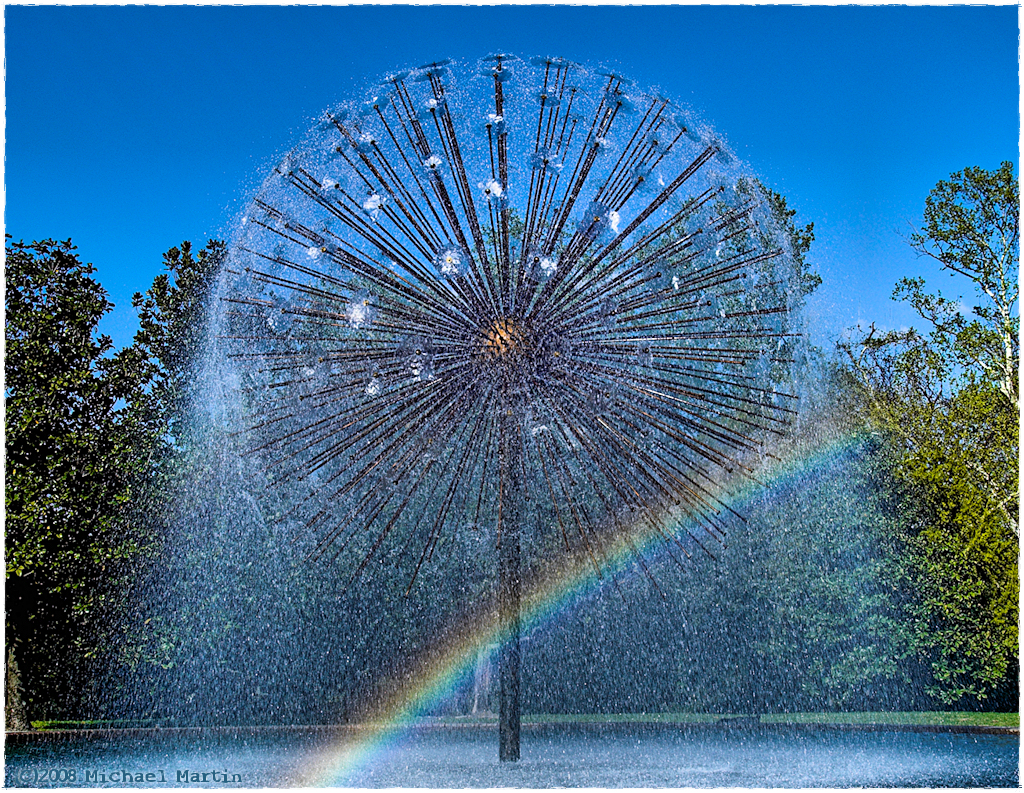
Gus S. Wortham Memorial Fountain, Houston, Texas, USA

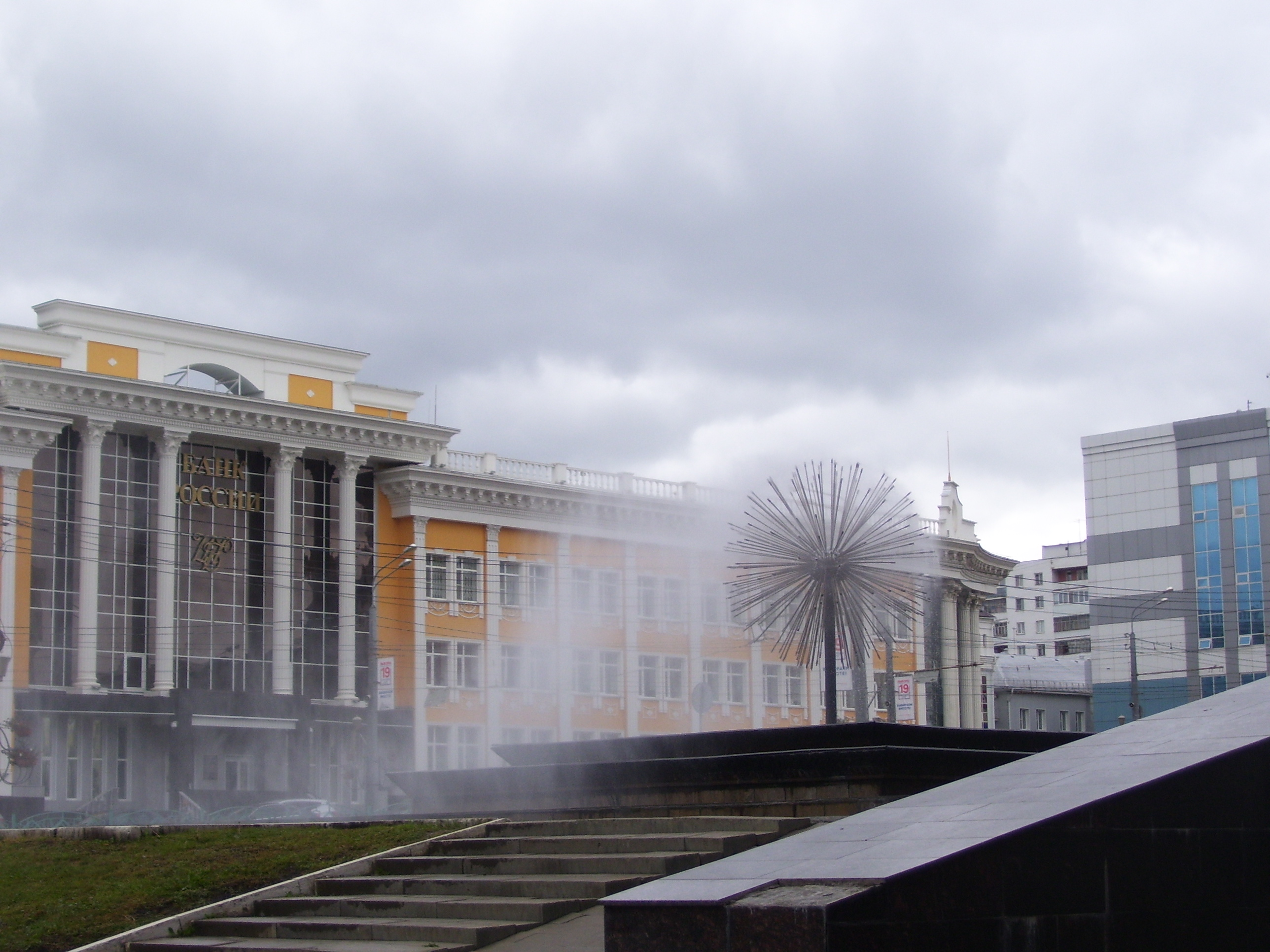
Fontan "Oduvanchik", Saransk, Mordovia, Russia

== See also ==
- List of public art in the City of Sydney
- Modernism
