= Robert Woodward (architect) =

Australian architect

Robert Woodward AM
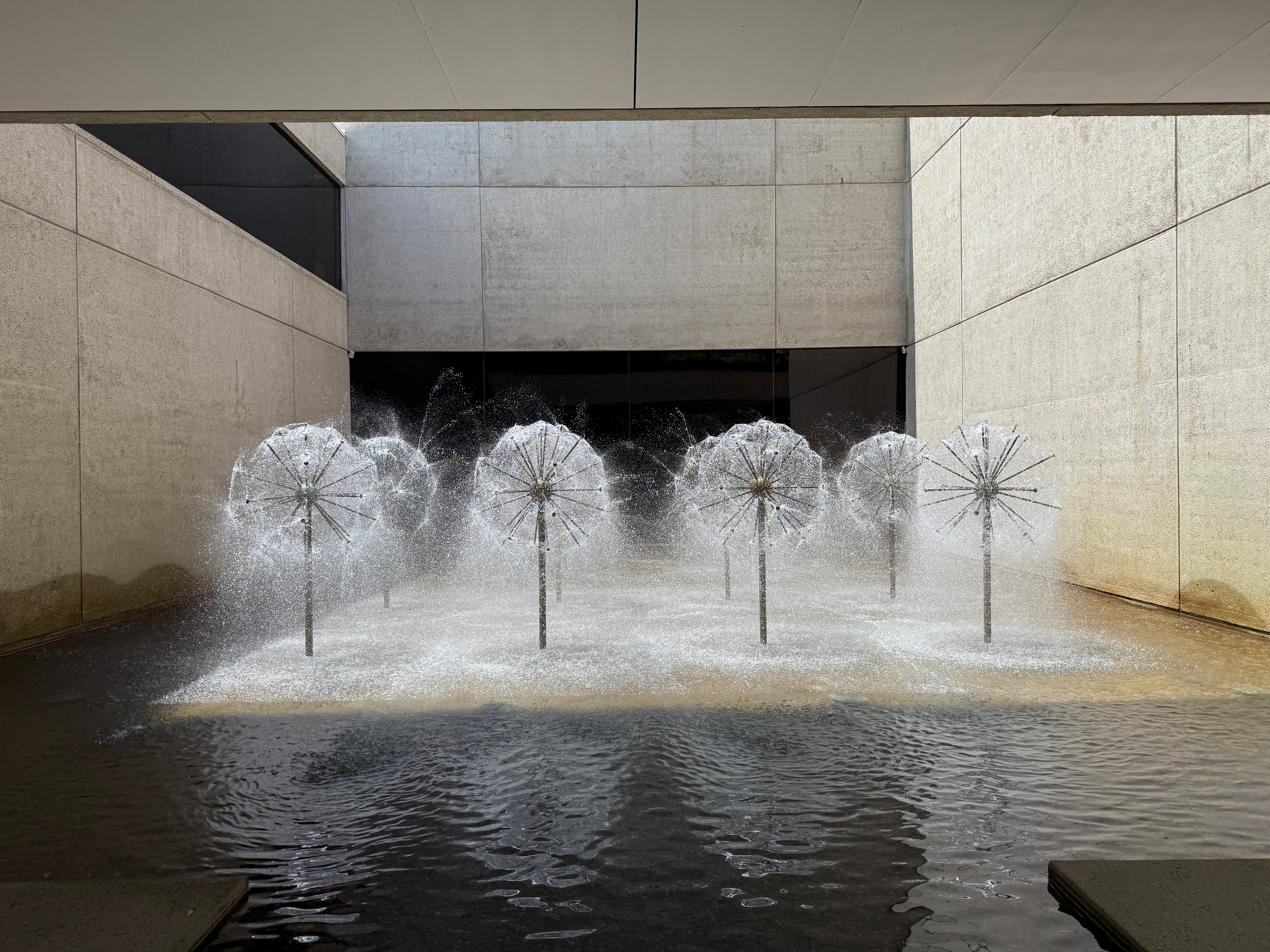
- Dandelion Fountains, Queensland Art Gallery (1982)
- Born: 5 June 1923; Wentworthville, New South Wales
- Died: 21 February 2010 (aged 86); Mosman, New South Wales
- Education: University of Sydney
- Occupations: Architect, Landscape Architect, Fountain Designer
- Years active: 1954—2010
- Awards: Walter Burley Griffin Award for Urban Design, 1991 Civic Design Award, 1964
- Practice: Woodward Taranto Wallace (until 1968)
- Projects: El Alamein Fountain; Darling Harbour Woodward Water Feature

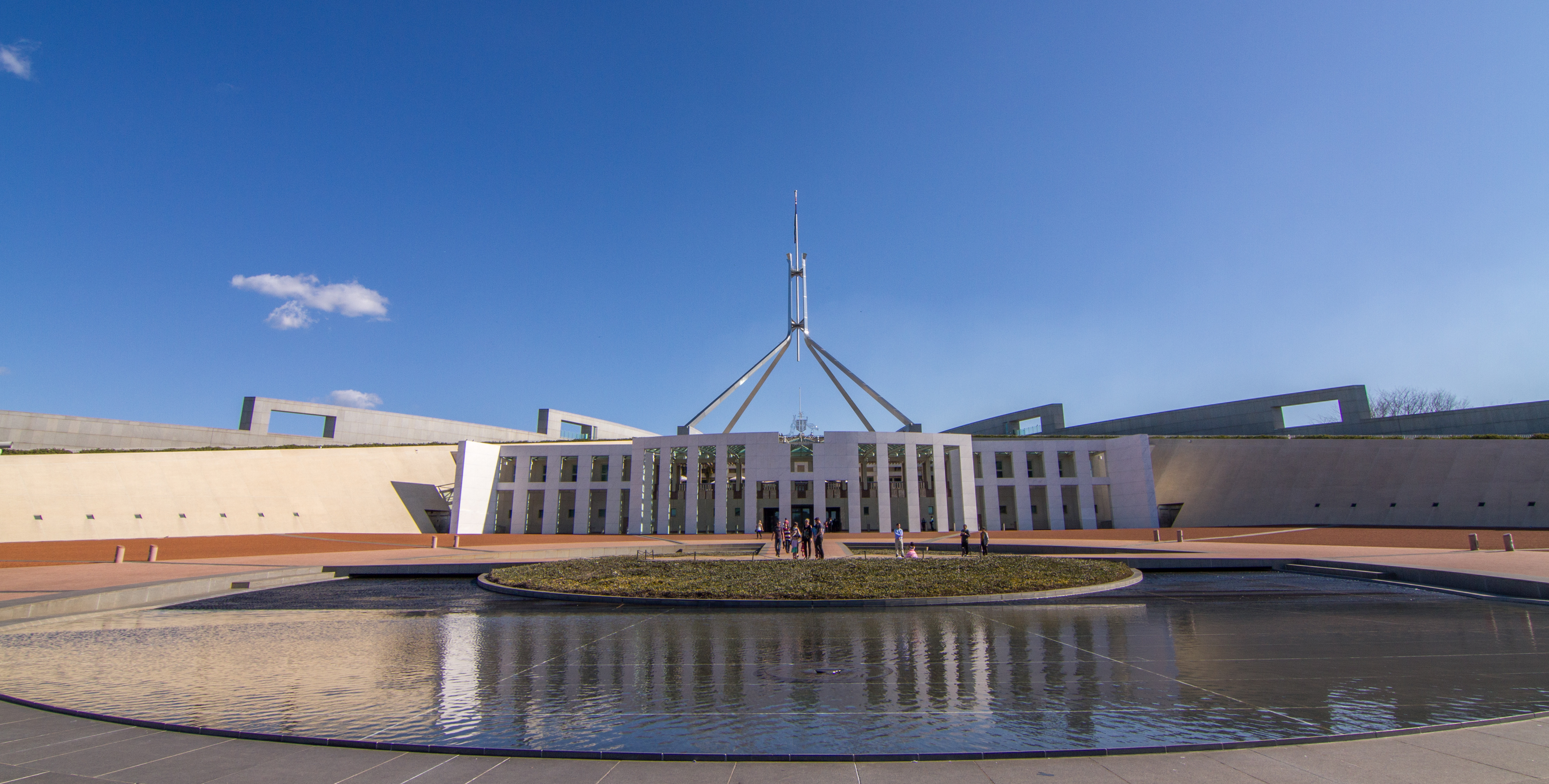
Parliament House, Canberra (1988)

Robert Raymond (Bob) Woodward AM (5 June 1923 – 21 February 2010) was an Australian architect who gained widespread recognition for his innovative fountain designs.

== Background and early career ==
Robert Raymond Woodward was born in Wentworthville in Sydney's western suburbs, the son of a public service accountant. Woodward was educated at Granville Technical Granville and Sydney Technical College. He served in the army during World War II working as an armourer. He was initially stationed with the Lachlan Macquarie 54th Regiment in Bathurst, then at Victoria Barracks where he completed an armoury course at East Sydney Technical College. Woodward later explained that being in the army at a young age had taught him to be responsible for the work he was doing and how to give instructions effectively. It also opened up the opportunity to study architecture at the University of Sydney School of Architecture, Design and Planning after the war as part of the huge post-war repatriation intake of ex-servicemen.

Woodward commenced his architectural degree in 1947 and was impressed by teachers such as Leslie Wilkinson, George Molnar and Lloyd Rees. As a student he worked for Harry Divola and Peddle Thorp and Walker, while he represented Australia in the 440-yard hurdles at the 1950 British Empire Games in New Zealand. After graduating with honours in 1952 he joined the Royal Australian Institute of Architects and worked briefly for Peddle Thorp & Walker, detailing industrial buildings, but soon headed off for England. He toured Europe with friends from Sydney before settling in Finland where he was privileged to work for a year with Alvar Aalto. He also spent another year in Finland working for the firm of Viljo Revell. Upon his return he went into partnership, forming Woodward, Taranto and Wallace, specialising in commercial and industrial architecture.

Woodward considered that architectural education in Finland was impressive in the way that it demanded that its students actually build structures. He considered that "architects need to understand materials" and was impressed by 'Aalto's multi-disciplinary approach where landscape is involved in the building, and interior design, lighting, furnishings, fabrics... I think Aalto's main contribution, and this is to put it very simplistically ... was that he was able to get the best of Bauhaus as well as organic work... Aalto's principles, as stated by him, are that essentially everything in architecture is related to biology. If you take a leaf from a tree, for example, you can see... design principles which should apply to architecture itself. The first item is cellular structure which Aalto saw as the cells being spatial — not physical elements put together but spaces, and a leaf is made up of a whole multitude of similar cells. They mightn't be the same but they are similar and from one family. The way they are structured together is a flexible combination of those elements – cellular structure, flexible combination and the repetition...'

Woodward returned to Sydney in 1954 where he had some job offers from big firms, but instead formed a small partnership with Phil Taranto in Bankstown, they were later joined by Scott Wallace. They worked on small scale sites like a fruit shop in Bankstown, where they rationalised the work spaces, designed light fittings and introduced mirrored walls to increase the impression of light and plenty — innovations which were widely "copied and mass produced".

== Fountains ==
In 1959, Woodward submitted a design to a City of Sydney competition to construct a fountain in Kings Cross, mainly as a professional "design exercise" for himself. The design commemorated the war service of the 9th Division of the Second Australian Imperial Force. He won the competition in the name of his firm Woodward & Taranto and went on to build the El Alamein Fountain, as it became known, was completed in 1961. Combining his architectural and earlier metalwork training he developed the "dandelion" inspired fountain which became one of the world's most copied designs. The fountain won the RAIA NSW Chapter Civic Design Award in 1964. The project was an immediate success and led to the gradual reorientation of his career into national and international prominence as a fountain designer. In 1968 the Woodward Taranto Wallace partnership was dissolved and Woodward continued alone as a sole practitioner with a focus on fountain design, joining the Australian Institute of Landscape Architects in 1989. He is responsible for many of the most prominent and admired fountains in Australia.

In his oral history interview with Hazel de Berg in 1972, Woodward stated:

'I like water very much, it's a fine medium to work in, a little difficult of course, one can't put it in a lathe or shape it as you do with metals, or forge it or cast it, but those difficulties themselves are what give it its main charm, I think, it's a medium to work in, a sculptural medium, it has form, it has transparency, it reflects light, has movement. It has constantly changing form, although one can control it. One can control the general form and let natural variations of water flow or wind or lighting variations give added charm and character whilst still directing the general form. '

Woodward suggested that he did not restrict himself to fountain design, as he explained to De Berg:

'The reason I do mostly fountain work and sculptural work now is . . . [it] is the most interesting work that is available. I'm working free-lance and I don't mind what the work is as long as it is interesting and I can achieve some result. . . there is a whole range of things that can be done and fields I would like to work in. As an example, there is the transport system, I would dearly love to have a commission just to re-plan in all respects our transport system for this state. . . The limitations, of course, are political and commercial ones, they'd be the ones I'd find it very difficult to overcome but if it was just from a design point of view only, I'd be delighted to take on a commission of that nature'.

Due to the success of this fountain, Woodward was approached for further commissions for fountain designs, significantly altering his career path. In 1979, he created the Canberra Times fountain, commissioned for the newspaper's fiftieth anniversary. Following this, he was commissioned to design a fountain for the High Court of Australia Building in Canberra, a cascade beside the ceremonial ramp. In 1981, he completed a fountain for GJ Coles & Company for the Parliament Reserve in Melbourne.

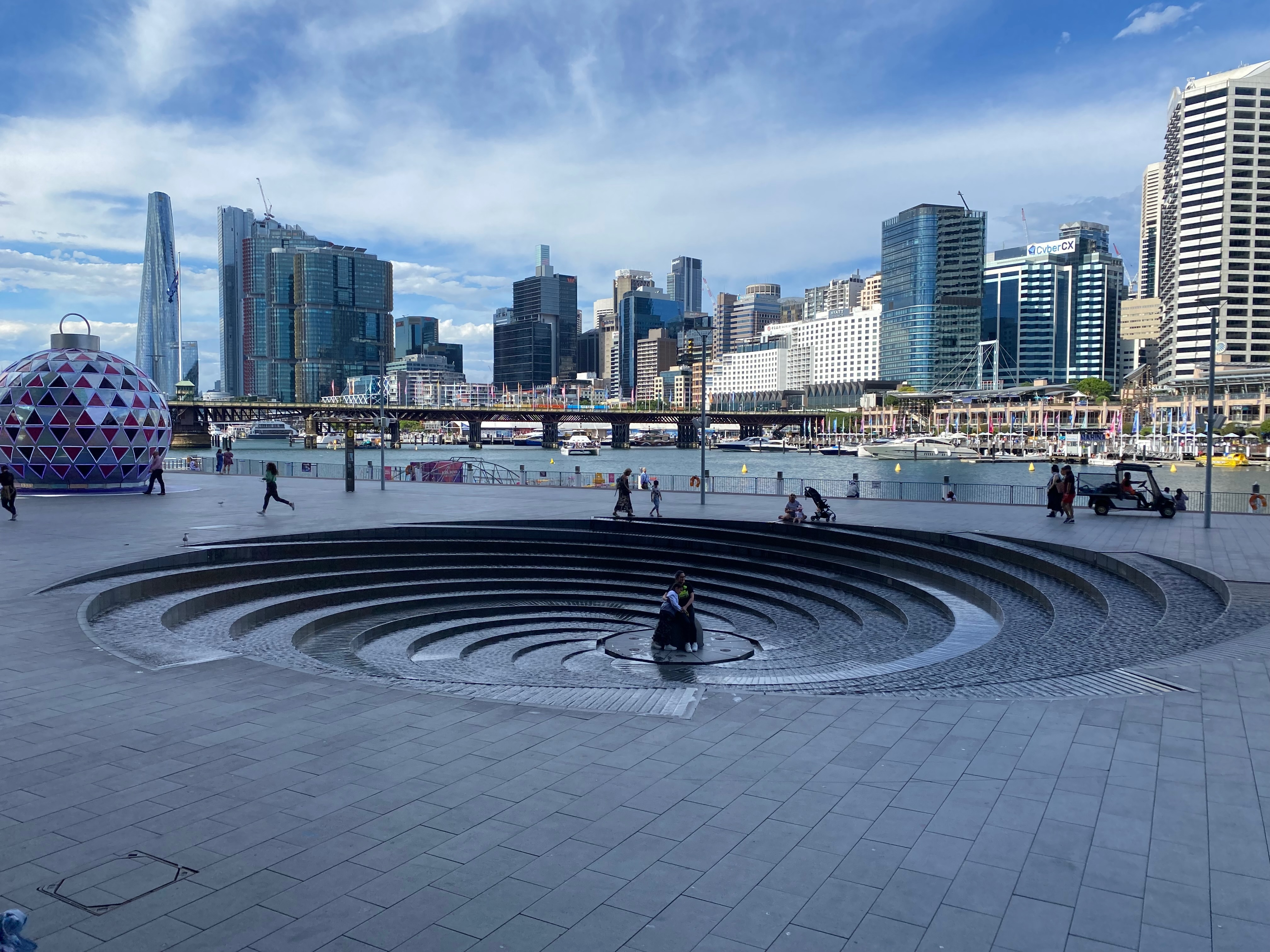
Tidal Cascade fountain, Darling Harbour, Sydney (1988; photo after restoration 2023)

The Darling Harbour Woodward Water Feature was completed outside the Sydney Convention & Exhibition Centre in 1988. The water feature is designed as a spiral structure set into the pavement. It features ten spiraling channels for water flow and two pedestrian paths, allowing visitors to walk through the installation.

In the 1990s Woodward successfully challenged the City of Sydney regarding the demolition of the 1970 built Endeavour Fountain in Chifley Square and was awarded $770,000.

== Awards and recognition ==
Woodward was the recipient of many awards and honours in his lifetime, including the inaugural NSW Royal Institute of Architect's Civic Design Award for the El Alamein Fountain in 1964, and the ACT Chapter RAIA Canberra Medallion in 1988 for New Parliament House, the 1991 NSW Chapter Lloyd Rees Award for Civic Design and the 1991 national RAIA Walter Burley Griffin Award for Urban Design for the Darling Harbour Fountain, and the 1992 AILA National Awards in Landscape Architecture Civic Design Project Award.

On 26 January 1987 Woodward was appointed a Member of Order of Australia for his services to architecture and fountain design.

In 1997 Woodward was recognised by the NSW Chapter of the Australian Institute of Architects with the naming of the Robert Woodward Award for Small Project Architecture.

=== Selected works by Robert Woodward ===
- El Alamein Fountain, Kings Cross, Sydney, Australia 1959
- St Paul's Church, (now Wentworthville Anglican), Wentworthville, Sydney, Australia 1964
- Sir Leslie Morshead Memorial Fountain, Shakespeare Place, Royal Botanic Garden, Sydney, Australia, 27 November 1966 (redesigned 1983 by Phil Taranto)
- Alcoa Building Forecourt Fountain, (now One Maritime Plaza), 300 Clay Street, San Francisco, USA 1967
- Archibald Fountain, restoration of 1933 fountain, Hyde Park, Sydney 1968
- Union Bank of California Fountain, Union Bank Tower (now OnPoint Plaza), 707 SW Washington Street, Portland, Oregon, USA 1969
- Dandelion Fountain, 1345 Avenue of the Americas, New York, USA 1969 (demolished 2019)
- Geyser Room Restaurant, New Zealand Pavilion, Expo '70, Osaka 1970
- Tupperware Forecourt Fountain, Orlando, Florida 1970
- Endeavour Fountain, Chifley Square, Sydney 1970
- Grace Memorial Fountain, Roselands, Sydney 1972
- Berger Foundation Fountain, Loring Park, 1382 Willow Street, Minneapolis, USA 1975
- Wall of Water, Town Hall Arcade, Sydney Square, Town Hall Station, Sydney 1976
- Blue Wave Ceramic Sculpture, Bondi Junction Plaza, Sydney, Australia 1977
- Mini El Alamein Fountain, Perak Turf Club, Ipoh, Malaysia 1978
- Canberra Times Fountain, Canberra 1979
- Forecourt Cascades, High Court of Australia Building, Canberra 1980
- Five Islands Fountain donated by the Illawarra Mercury, Burelli Street (later moved to Wollongong Botanic Gardens), Wollongong 1981
- GJ Coles Fountain, Parliament Gardens, Melbourne, Australia 1981
- Lane Cove Plaza proposal, Lane Cove, Sydney, Australia 1981
- Mount Street Doughnuts, North Sydney, Australia 1982
- Water Mall and Dandelions, Queensland Art Gallery, Australia 1982
- Waterlink, Sculpture Garden, National Gallery of Australia, Canberra 1982
- New South Wales Parliament House Courtyard Fountain, Sydney 1983
- Lyric Theatre Fountain (Cascade Court Fountain), Queensland Performing Arts Centre, Brisbane, Australia 1984
- Palmerston City Square Fountain, Darwin, Northern Territory, Australia 1985
- Pacific Bell Forecourt Fountain, San Ramon, California, USA 1988
- Forecourt, Parliament House, Canberra, Australia 1988
- Darling Harbour Water Feature (Tidal Cascade) outside the Sydney Convention & Exhibition Centre, Darling Harbour, Sydney, Australia 1988
- Modular Spiral Stair, precast Bankstown

== Selected works ==
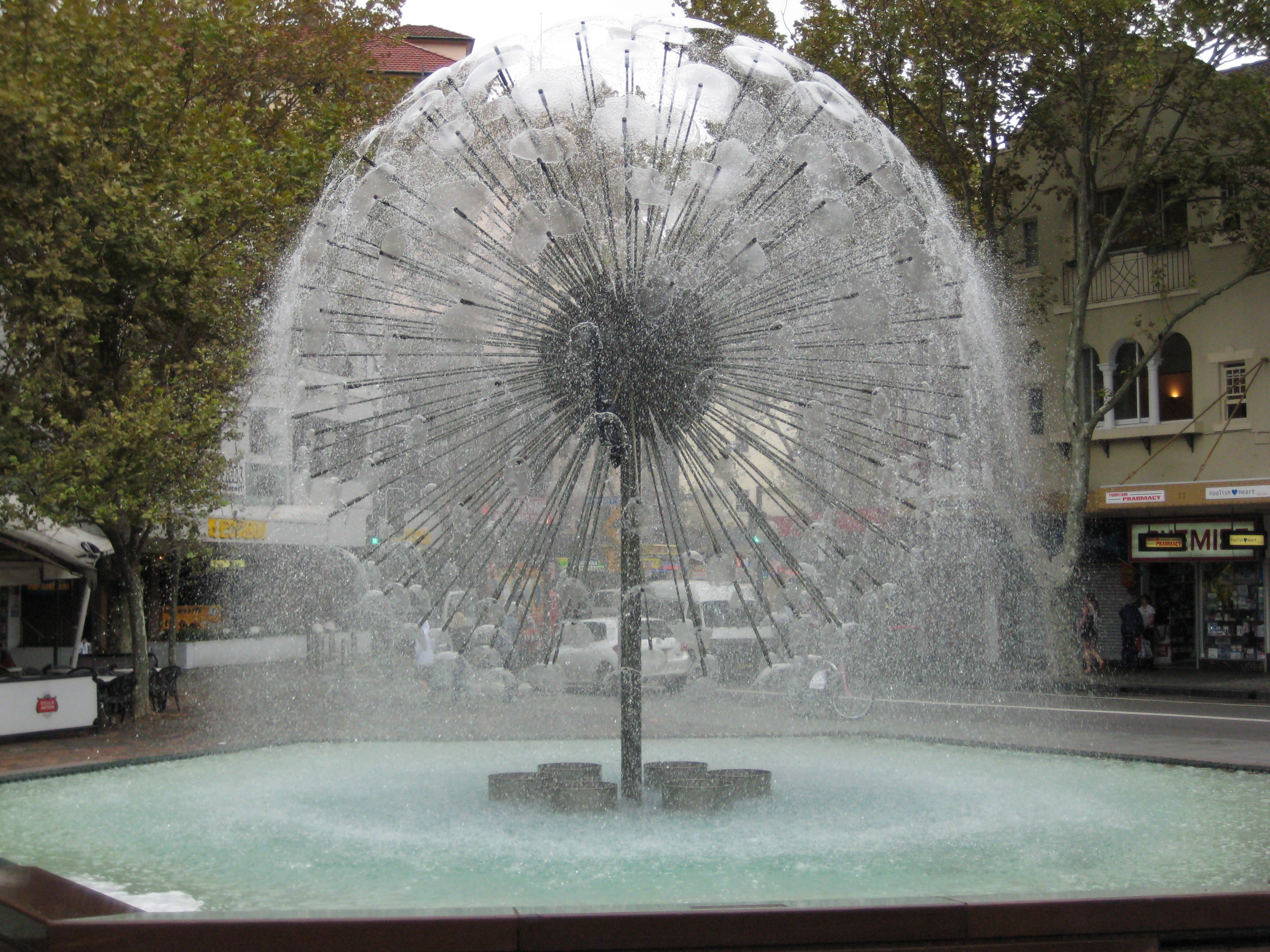
El Alamein Fountain, Kings Cross (1961)

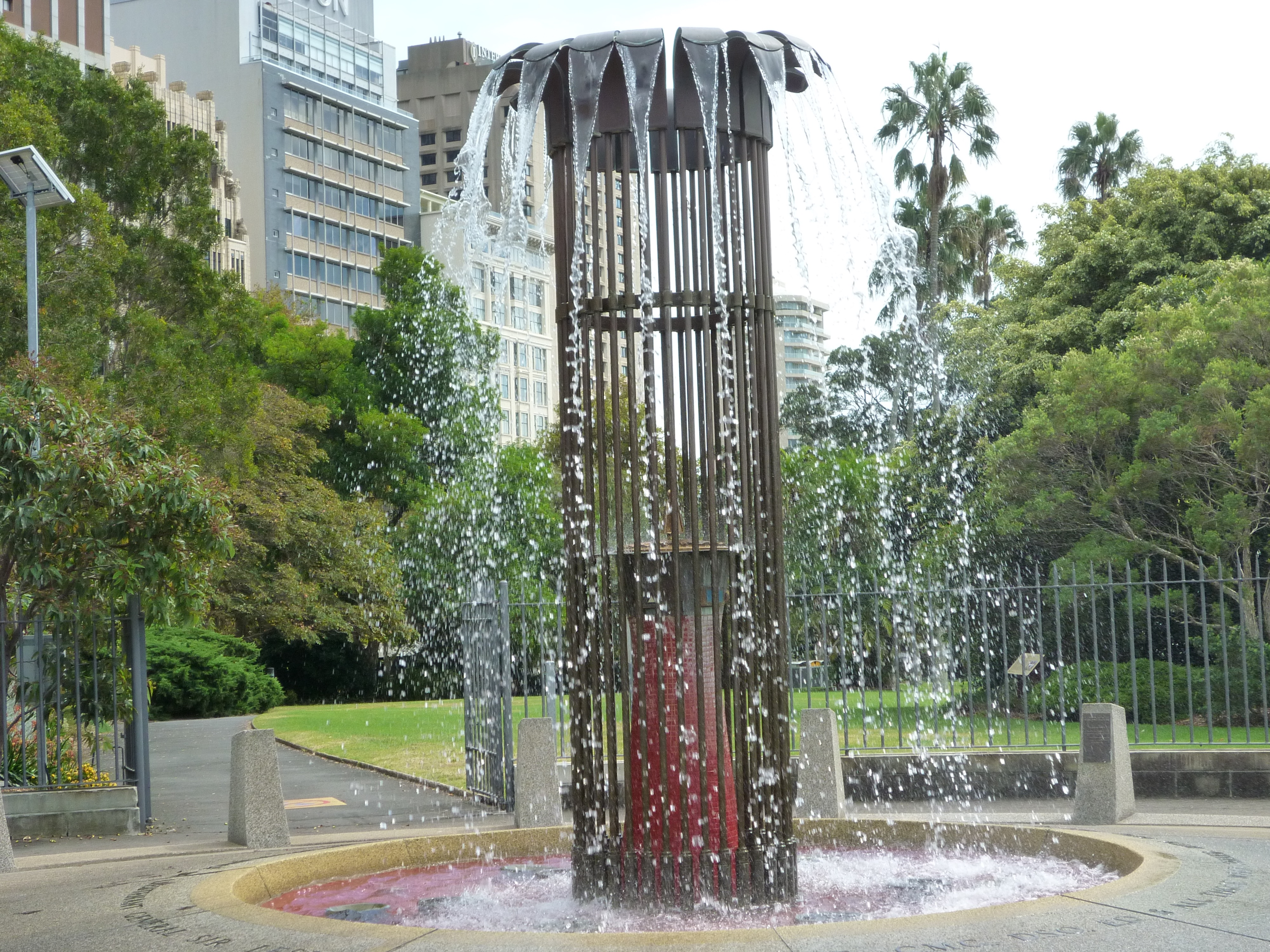
Morshead Fountain in the Royal Botanic Garden, Sydney (1966)

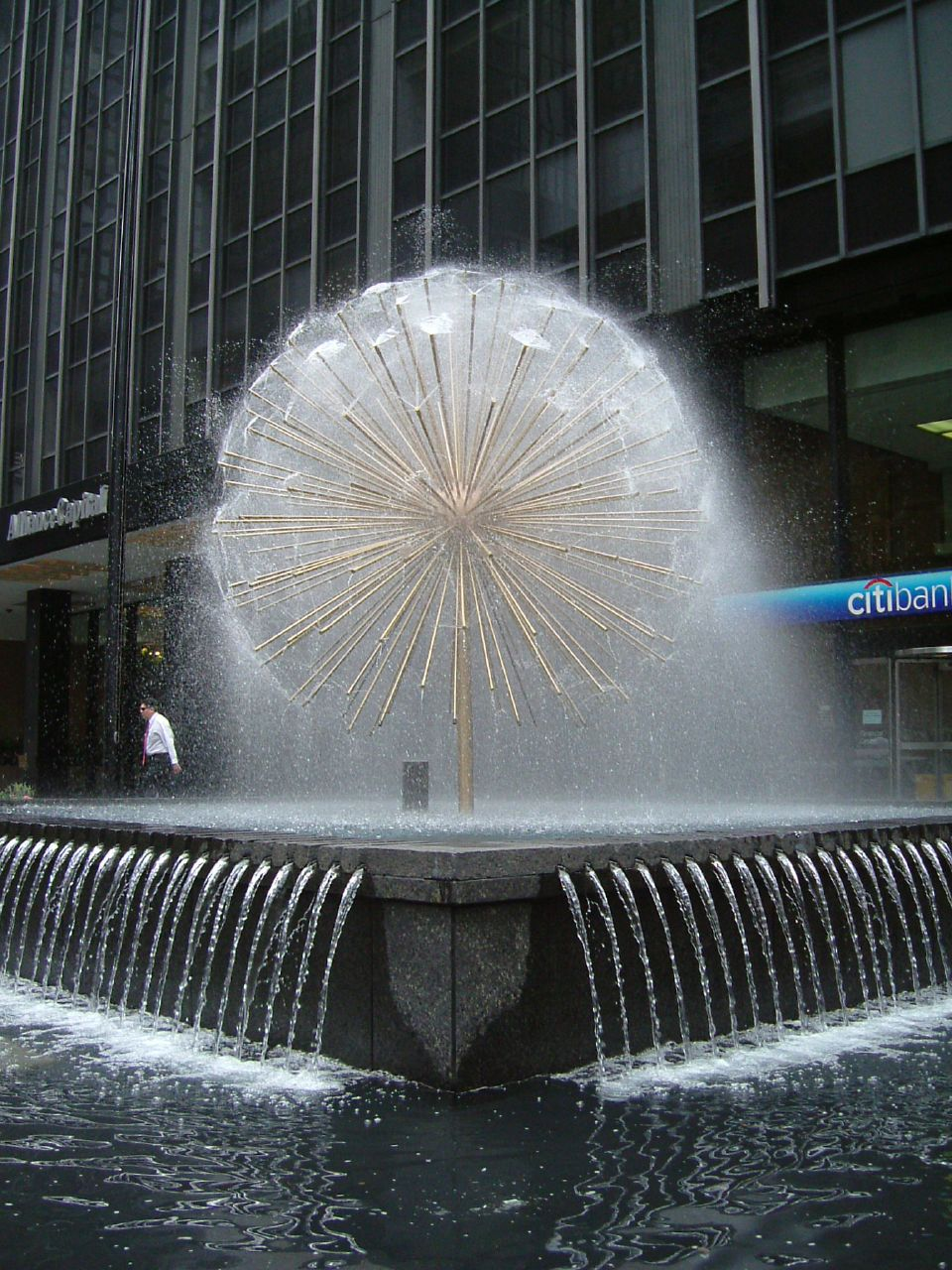
1345 Avenue of the Americas (1969, demolished 2019)

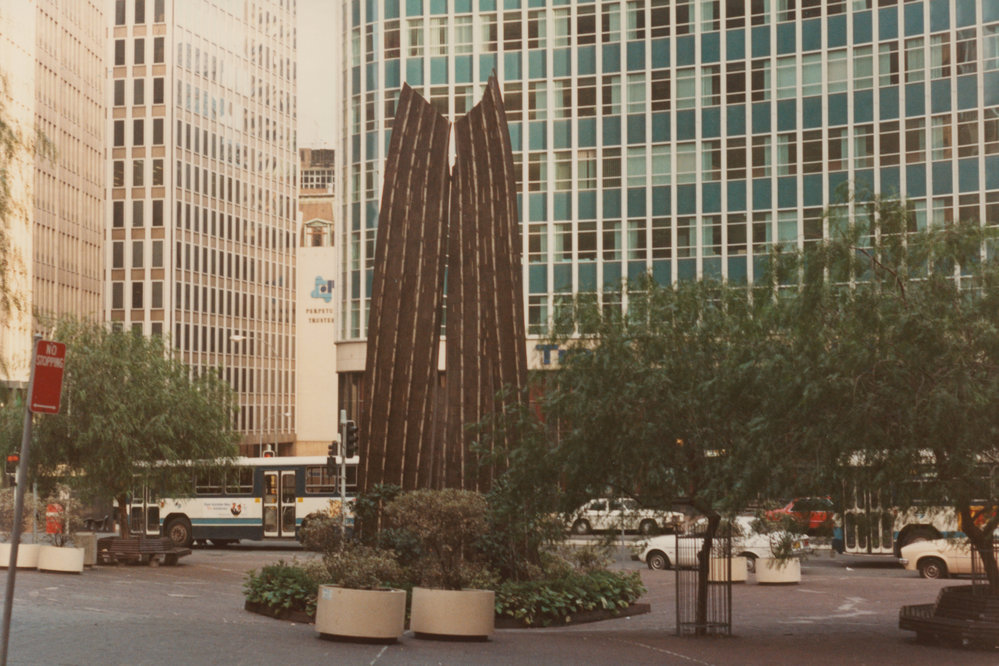
Endeavour Fountain, Chifley Square, Sydney (1970, demolished 1993)

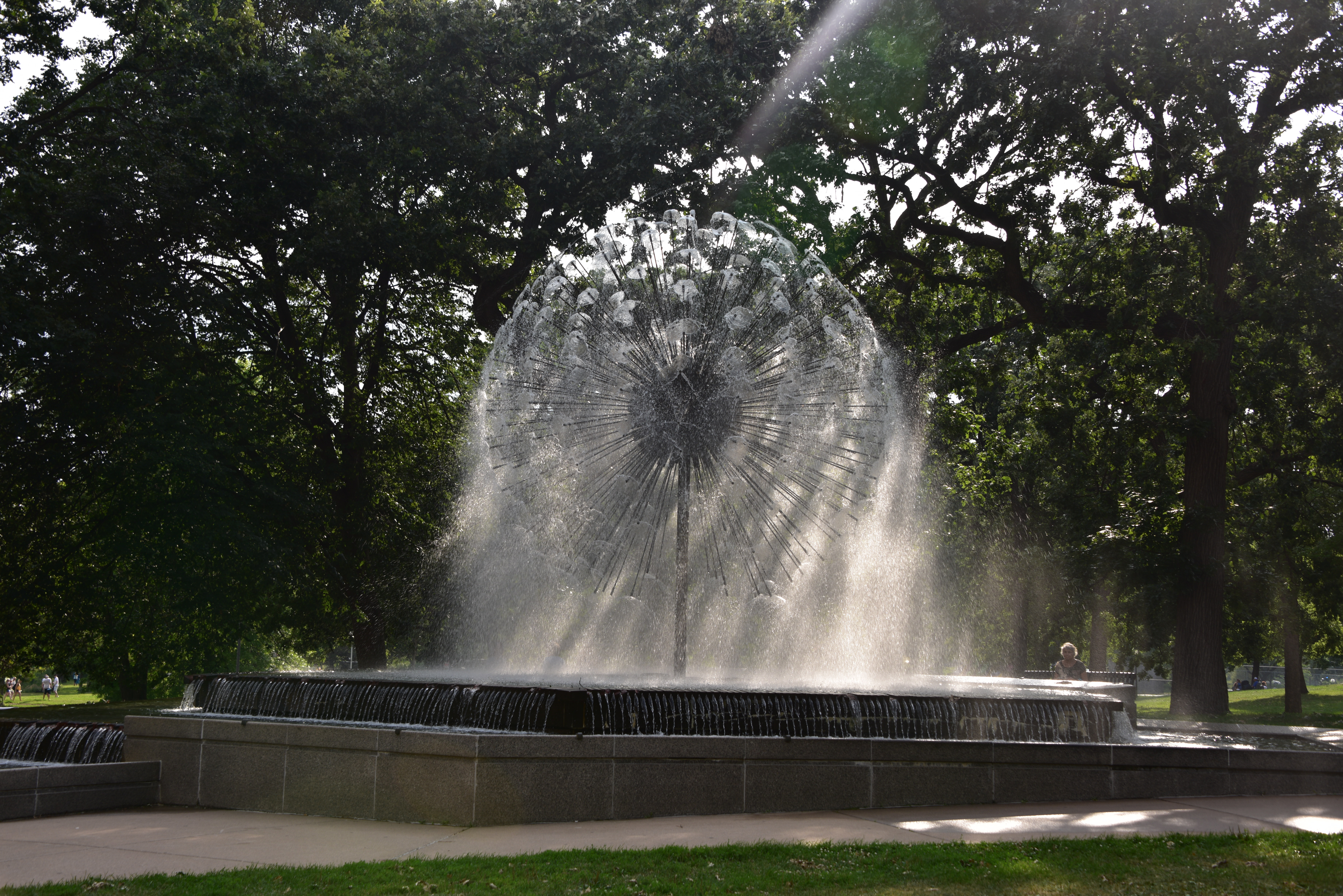
Berger Fountain, Loring Park, Minneapolis (1975)

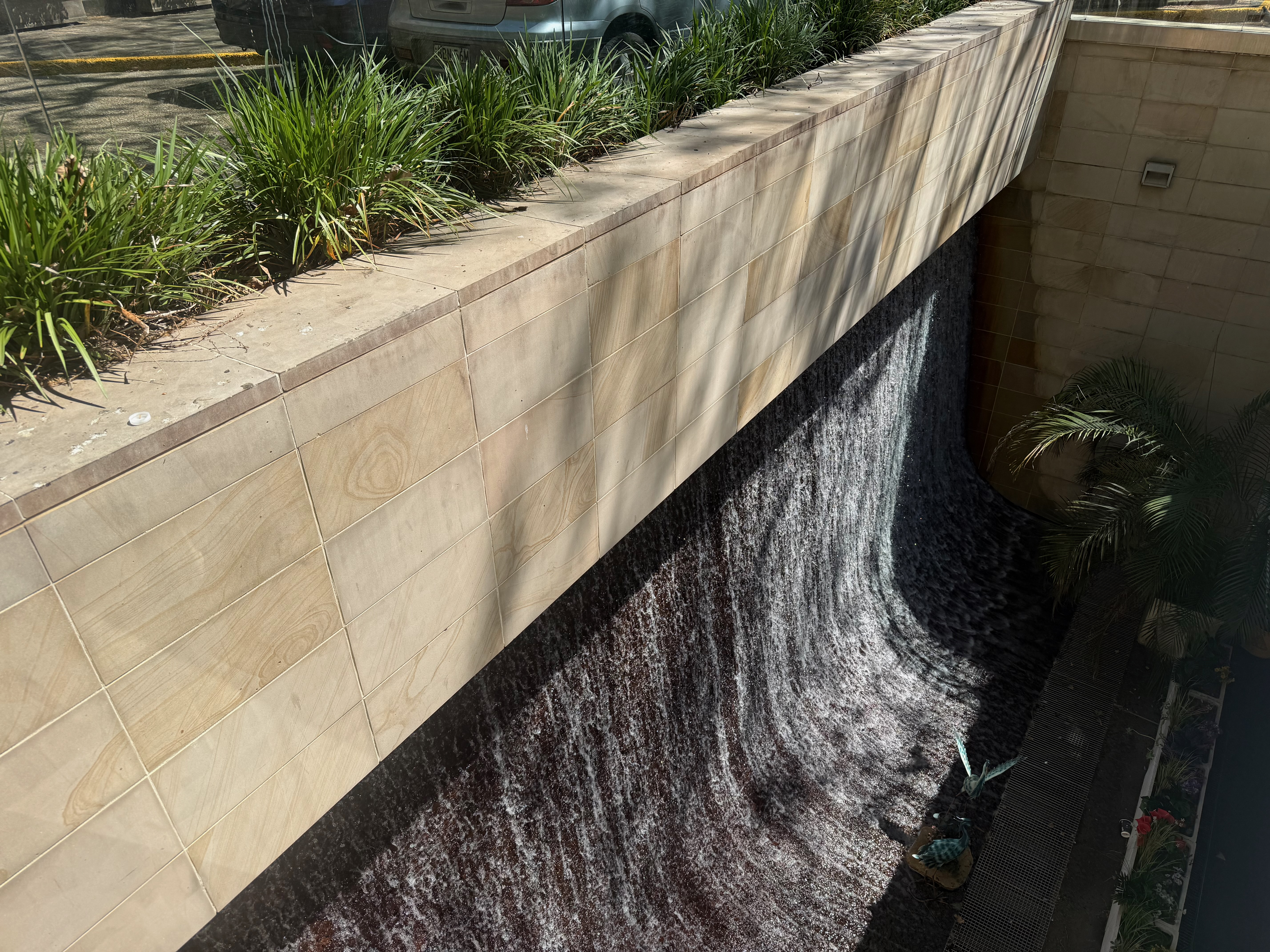
Cascading water feature at Town Hall Arcade, Sydney Square (1976)

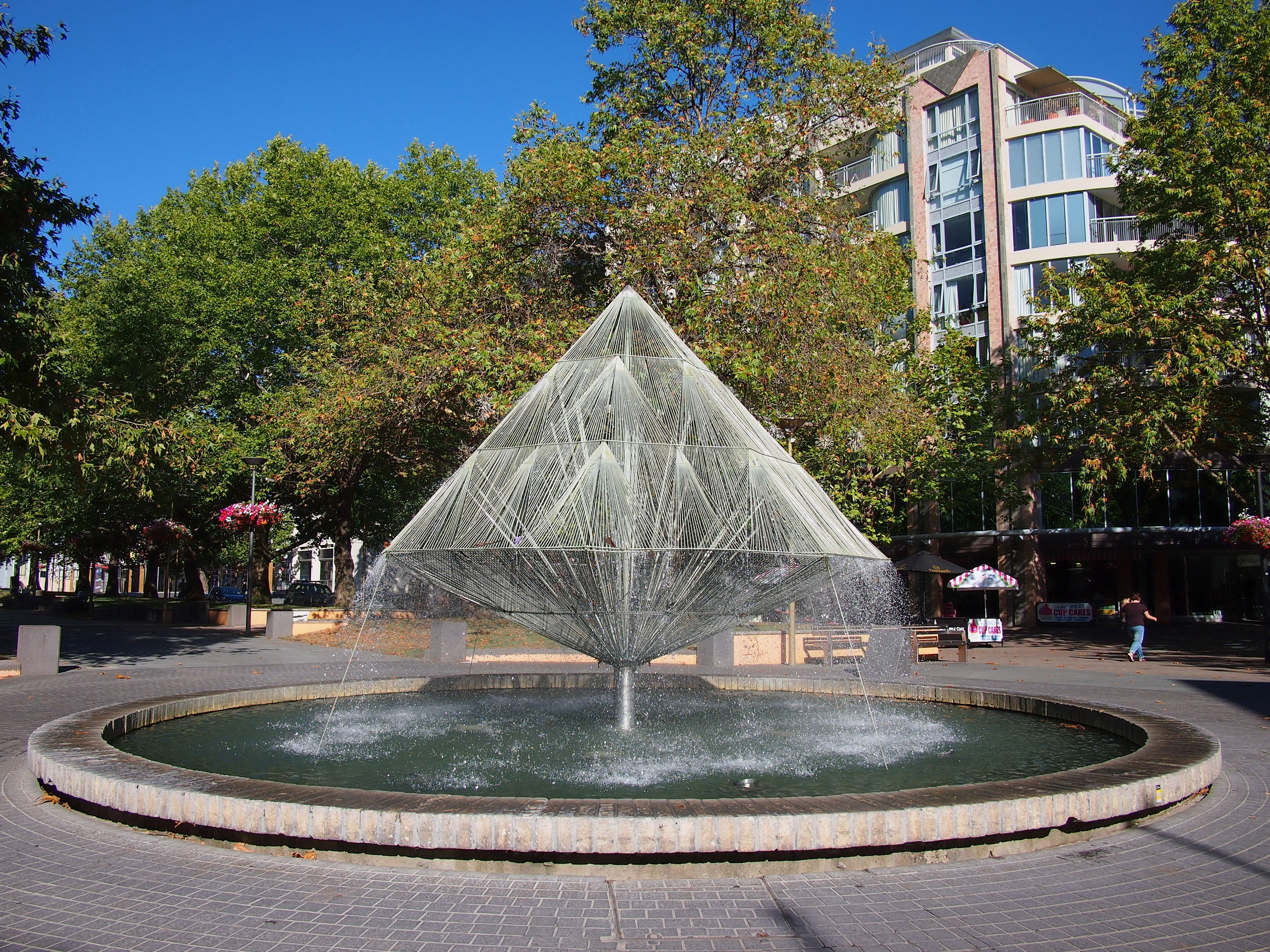
The Canberra Times Fountain, Canberra (1979)

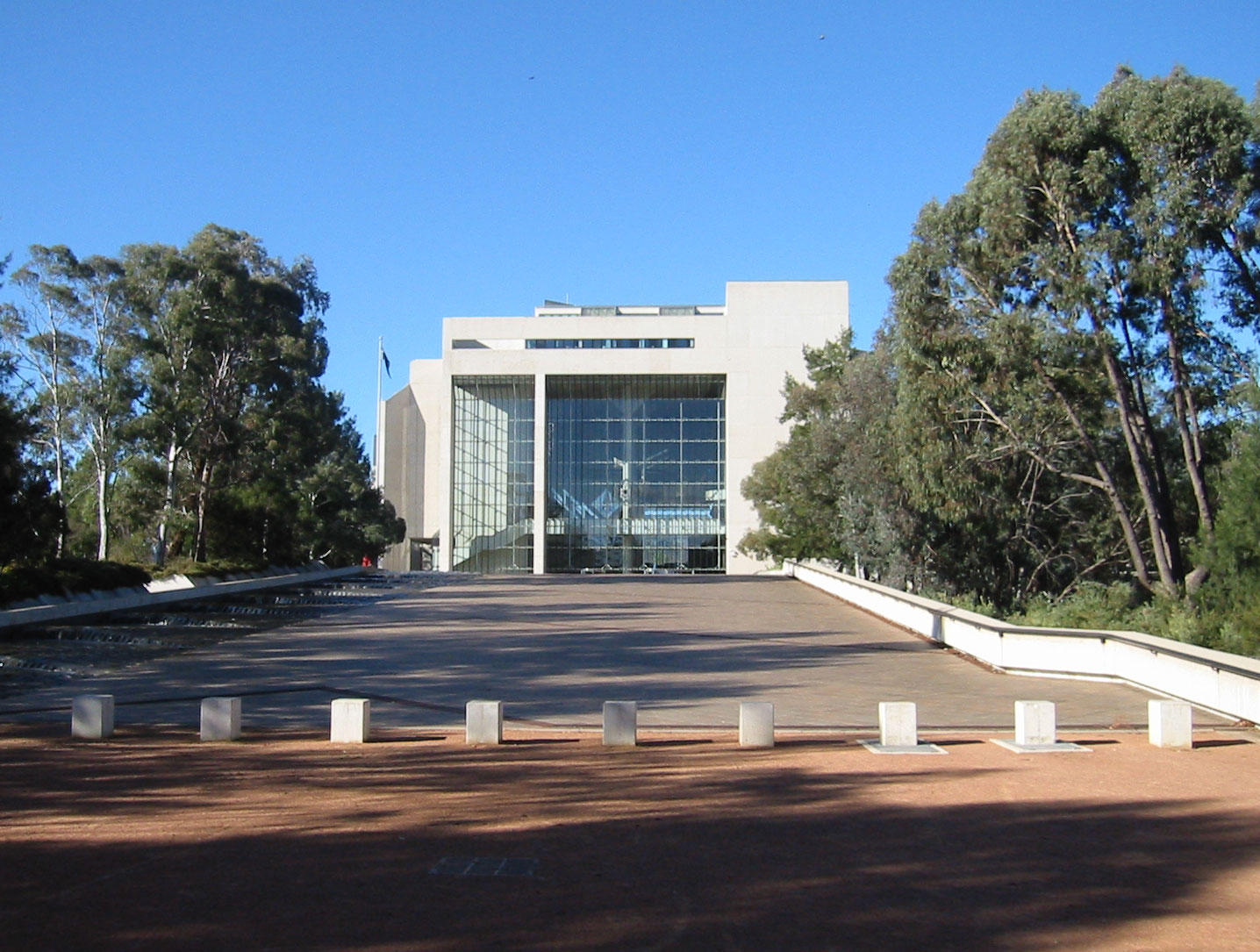
Cascade at the High Court of Australia Building, Canberra (1980)

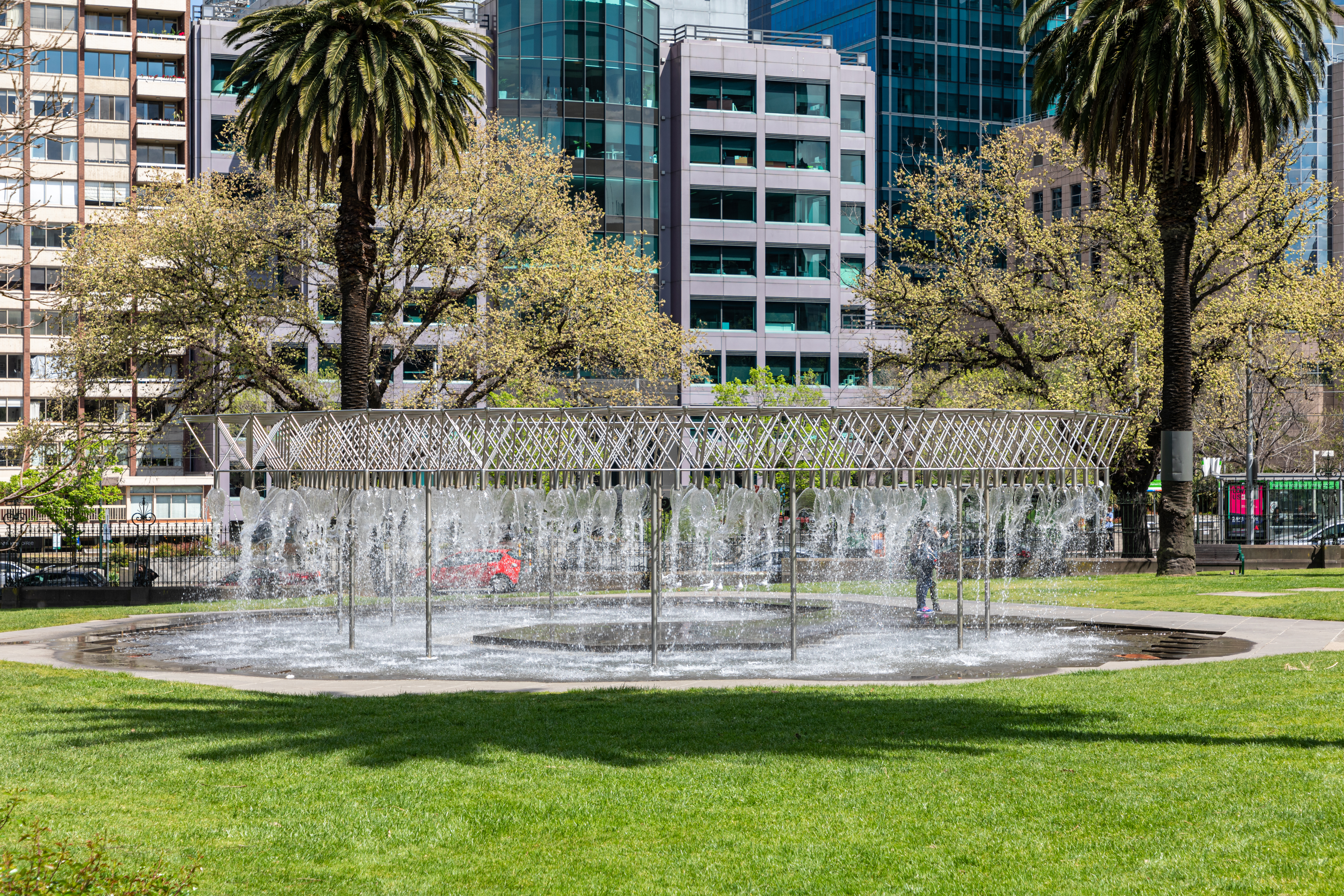
Coles Fountain, Parliament Gardens, Melbourne (1981)

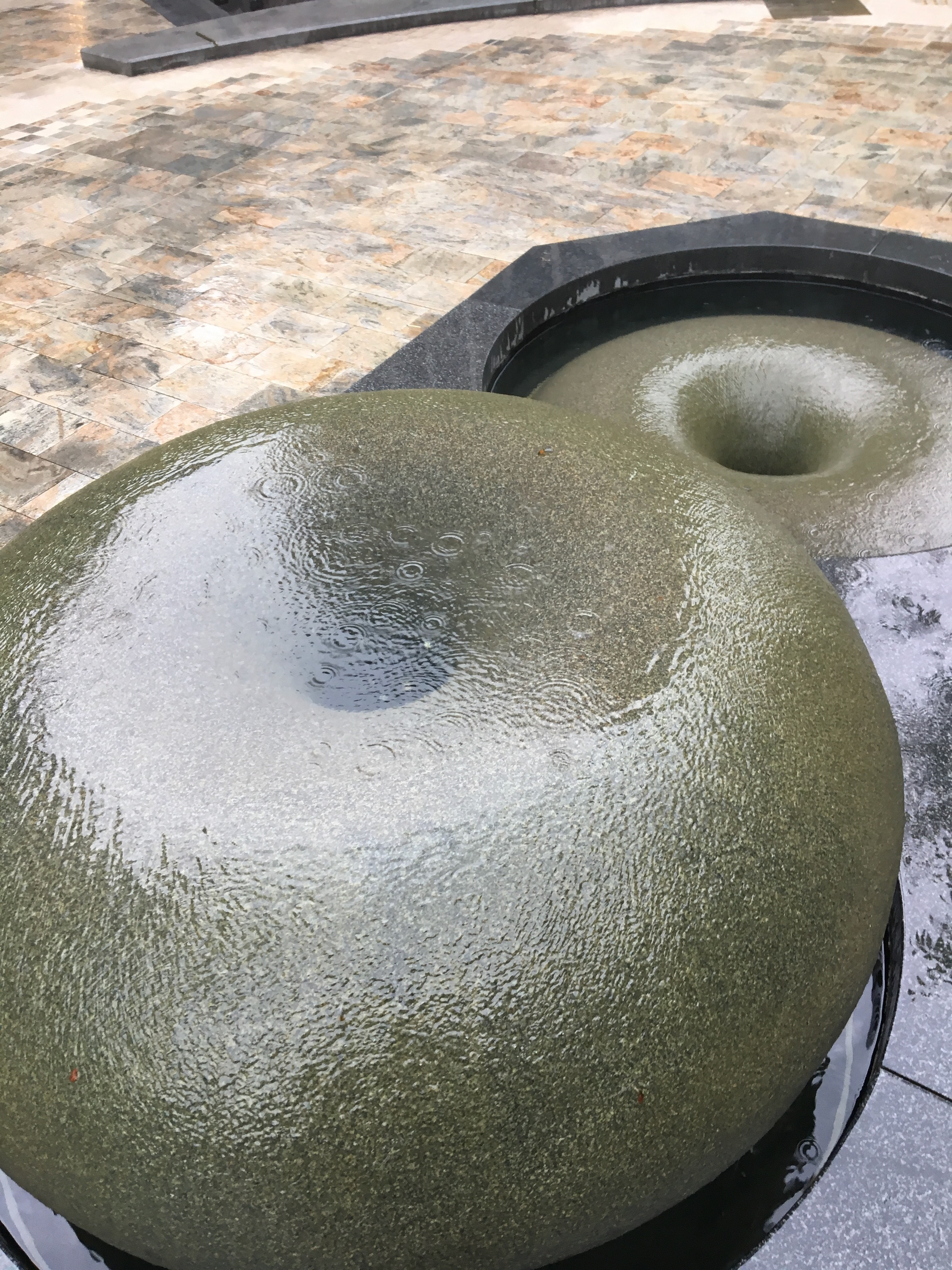
Doughnuts, Mount Street Plaza, North Sydney (1982)

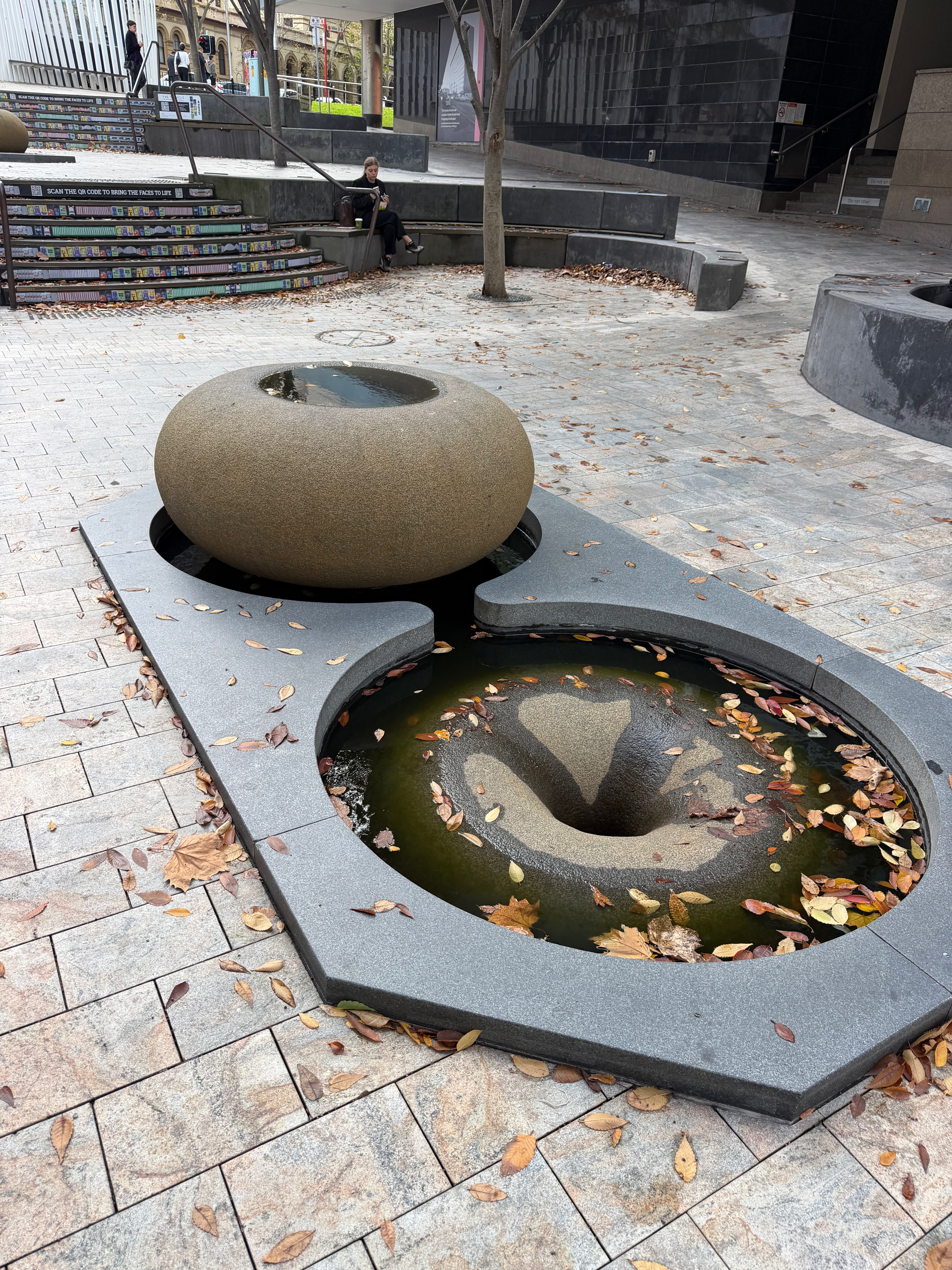
Doughnuts (another view)

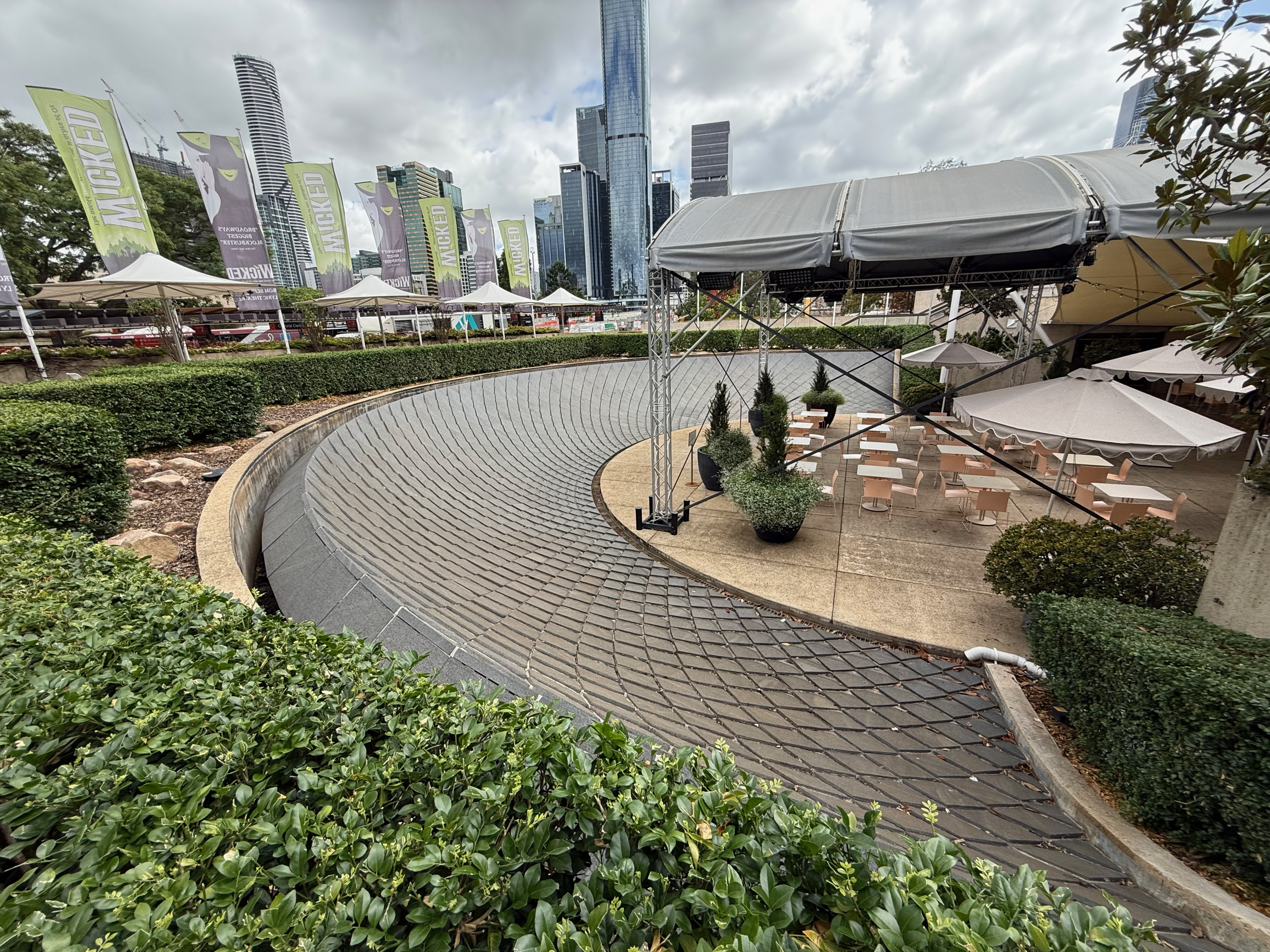
Lyric Theatre Fountain, Queensland Performing Arts Centre (1982)

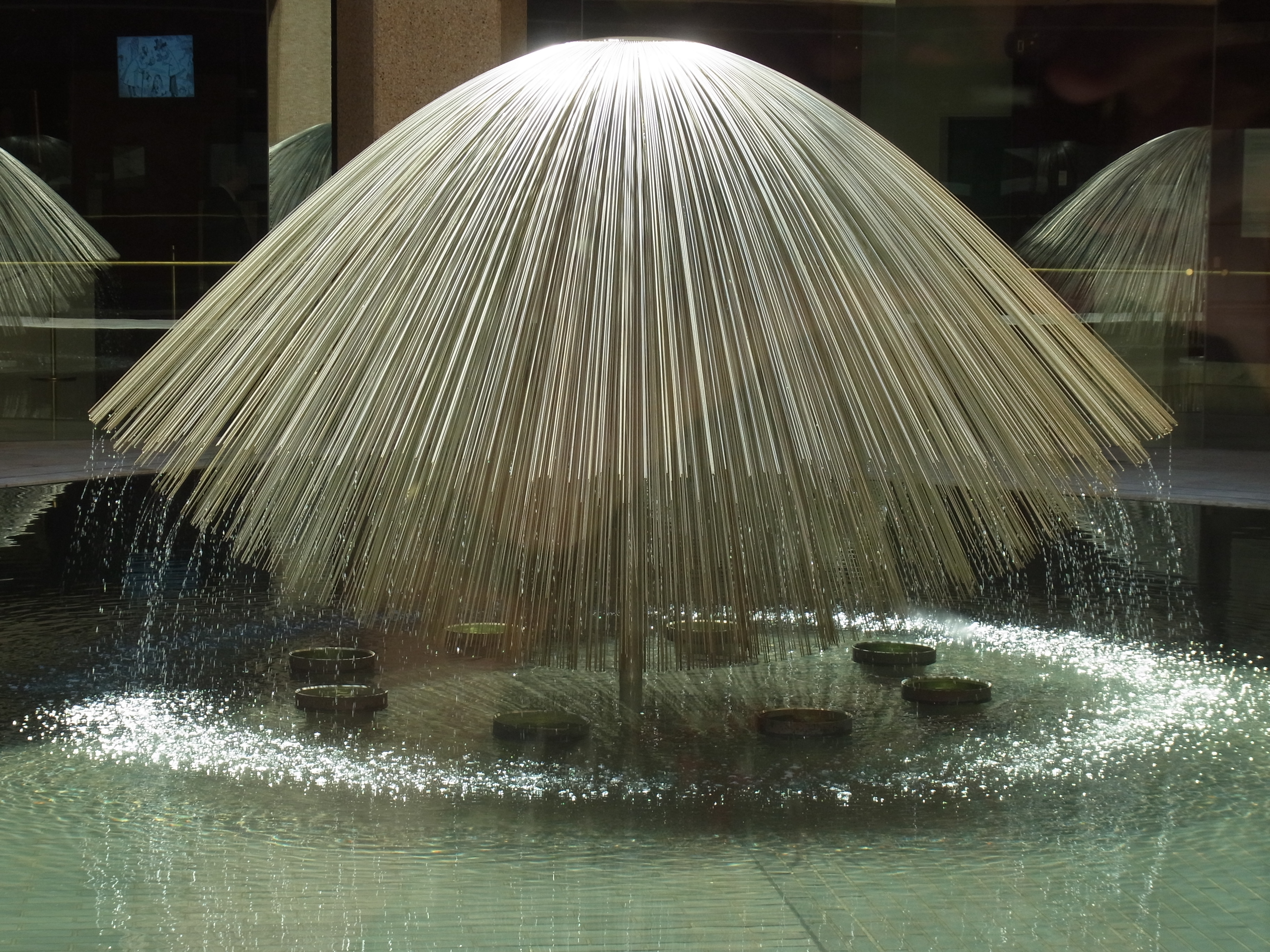
Fountain at NSW Parliament House, Sydney (1983)

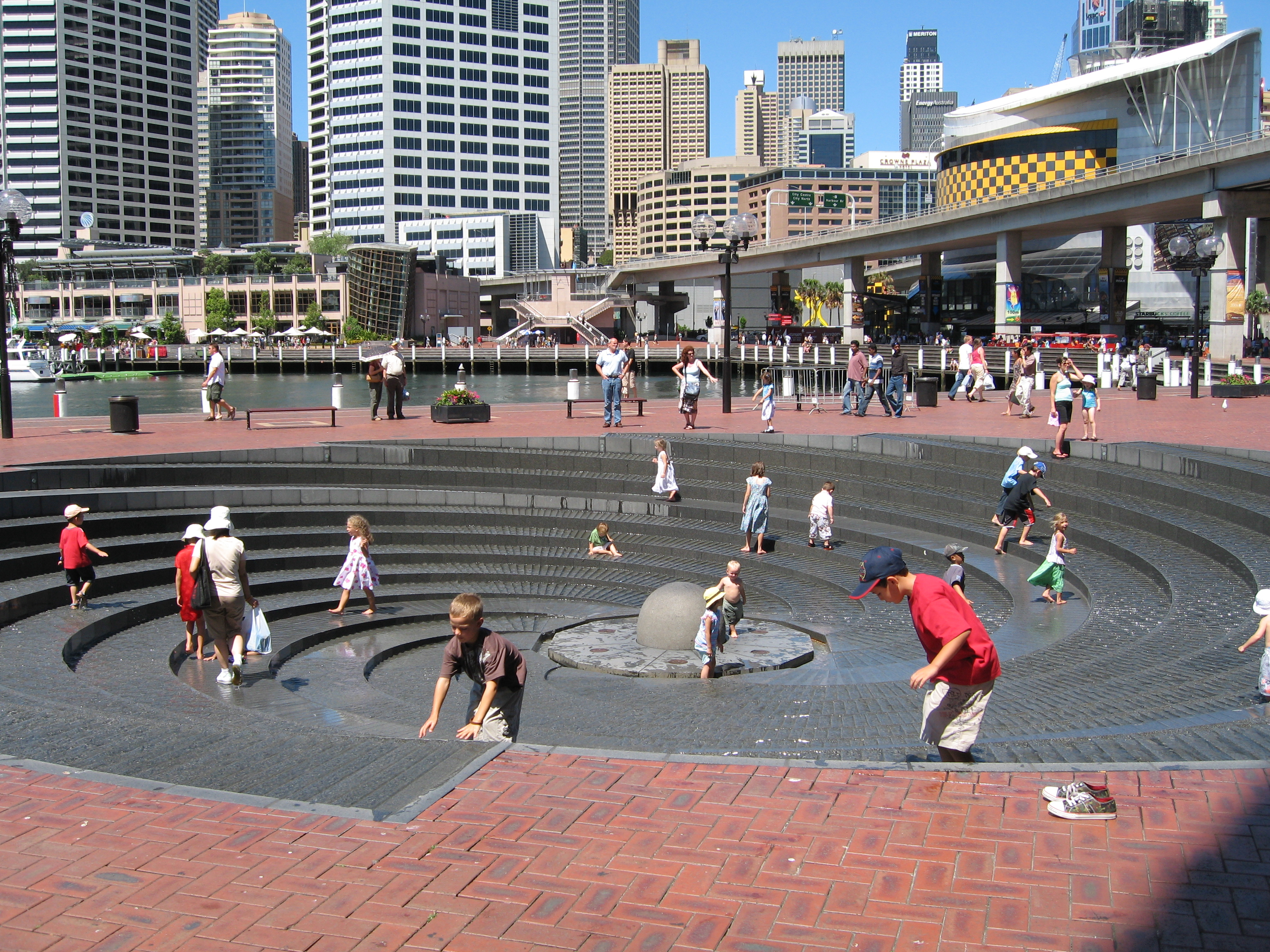
Darling Harbour Water Feature, Darling Harbour (1988)
