= Darling Harbour Woodward Water Feature =

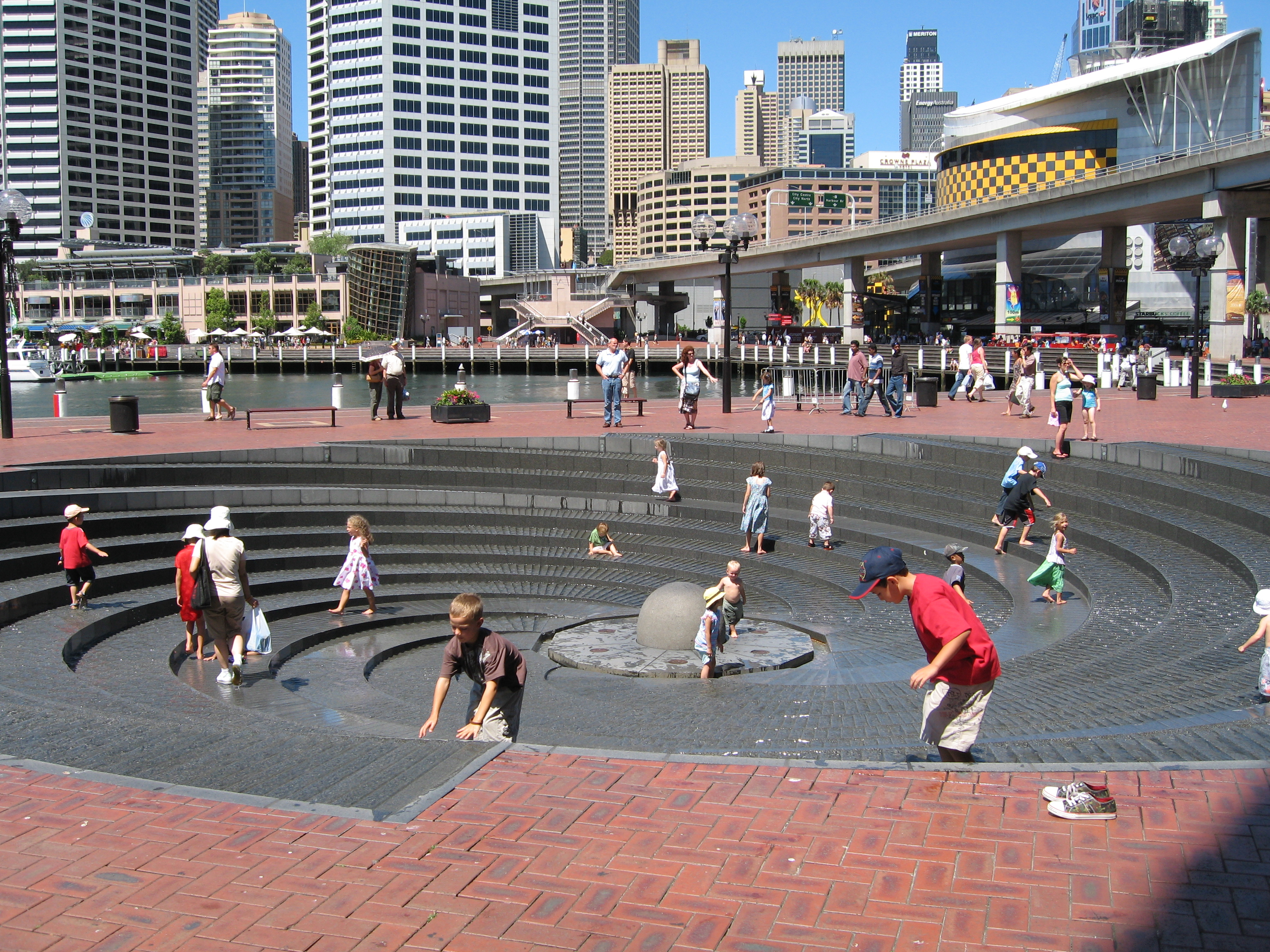
- Tidal Cascade, pictured in 2006

- Location within Sydney Location within Australia
- 33.8731°S 151.1999°E
- Location: Darling Harbour, Sydney, Australia

History
- Built: 1986–1988

Site notes
- Architect: Robert Woodward
- Owner: Placemaking NSW

New South Wales Heritage Register
- Official name: Tidal Cascade
- Type: state heritage (landscape)
- Designated: 27 June 2014
- Reference no.: 1933
- Type: Other – Landscape – Cultural
- Category: Landscape – Cultural
- Builders: Stone Mason: Melocco Pty Ltd

The Darling Harbour Woodward Water Feature (officially named Tidal Cascade) is a heritage-listed water fountain located at Darling Harbour, Sydney, Australia. It was designed by Robert Woodward and built by Melocco Pty Ltd opening in 1988 as part of the redevelopment of the Darling Harbour precinct.

== History ==
The Darling Harbour Water Feature was officially opened in 1988. It was designed by Robert Woodward.

== Description ==
The Woodward Water Feature is located in Sydney's Darling Harbour waterfront promenade. It is bounded by the International Convention Centre to the west, the Western Distributor to the south and Cockle Bay to the east.

The fountain is a spiral water feature in an unassuming saucer-shaped depression in the bare harbour-side concourse; a shape cleanly cut, as if by an auger, into the pavement; ten spiraling paths for water and two for people; a mesmerizing flow of shallow rippling water.

=== Hydraulic principles ===
Water flows from the header at the top of each of the ten spirals as smooth, accelerating supercritical flow. When maximum velocity for the 1 in 16 gradient and roughness coefficient has been reached, the flow becomes constant and is therefore critical, a condition of least possible stability. In this unstable condition water is easily sculpted by minor external forces. The weir configuration and drag disturbance from the sides of the spiral create waves which travel downstream. The waves move across the spiral at an angle and reflect from the opposite side; crisscross interference patterns result. The wavelength is constant and sympathetic group wave action develops and continues down the spiral. This wave action is an original creation which probably does not occur in nature.

The 360-square-metre (3,900 sq ft) of crisscross wave action over 3000 identical weir stones is created by the energy from a 5 litres per second (0.18 cu ft/s) total flow, the same as from a domestic swimming pool filter.

=== Condition ===
As at 22 July 2013, the fabric is in good condition.

The Darling Harbour Water Feature is a highly intact example of a rare fountain form designed by Robert Woodward. Woodward created a water flow condition that is easily sculpted by minor external forces. The weir configuration and drag disturbance from the sides of the spiral create waves which travel downstream. The waves move across the spiral at an angle and reflect from the opposite side; crisscross interference patterns result. The wavelength is constant and sympathetic group wave action develops and continues down the spiral. This wave action is an original creation which probably does not occur in nature.

=== Awards ===
Robert Woodward won the following awards for his Darling Harbour Water Feature:

- RAIA Lloyd Rees Award for Civic Design, 1991 (NSW Chapter)
- RAIA National Walter Burley Griffin Award for Urban Design, 1991
- AILA National Civic Design Award, 1992

== Heritage listing ==
As at 26 May 2014, the Darling Harbour Woodward Water Feature is of state significance as it demonstrates aesthetic significance at the state level as a spectacular fountain and an outstanding work of modern movement design in water and stone located in an uninterrupted plane of the west Darling Harbour promenade. Completed in 1988, the fountain design was acknowledged as one of exemplary architectural design for its period, winning several awards including the Walter Burley Griffin Award of the Royal Australian Institute of Architects and the NSW Chapter Civic Design Award in 1991 and the Australian Institute of Landscape Architects National Civic Design Award in 1992.

The Darling Harbour water feature is of state significance as it has special associations with its designer Woodward, a notable architect and a World War II Veteran whose career as a fountain designer was of national and international prominence. Together with other iconic buildings at the Darling Harbour it is associated with the historically significant 1988 NSW Bicentennial celebrations. The Darling Harbour Woodward Water Feature was listed on the New South Wales State Heritage Register on 27 June 2014.
