= Architecture of Australia =

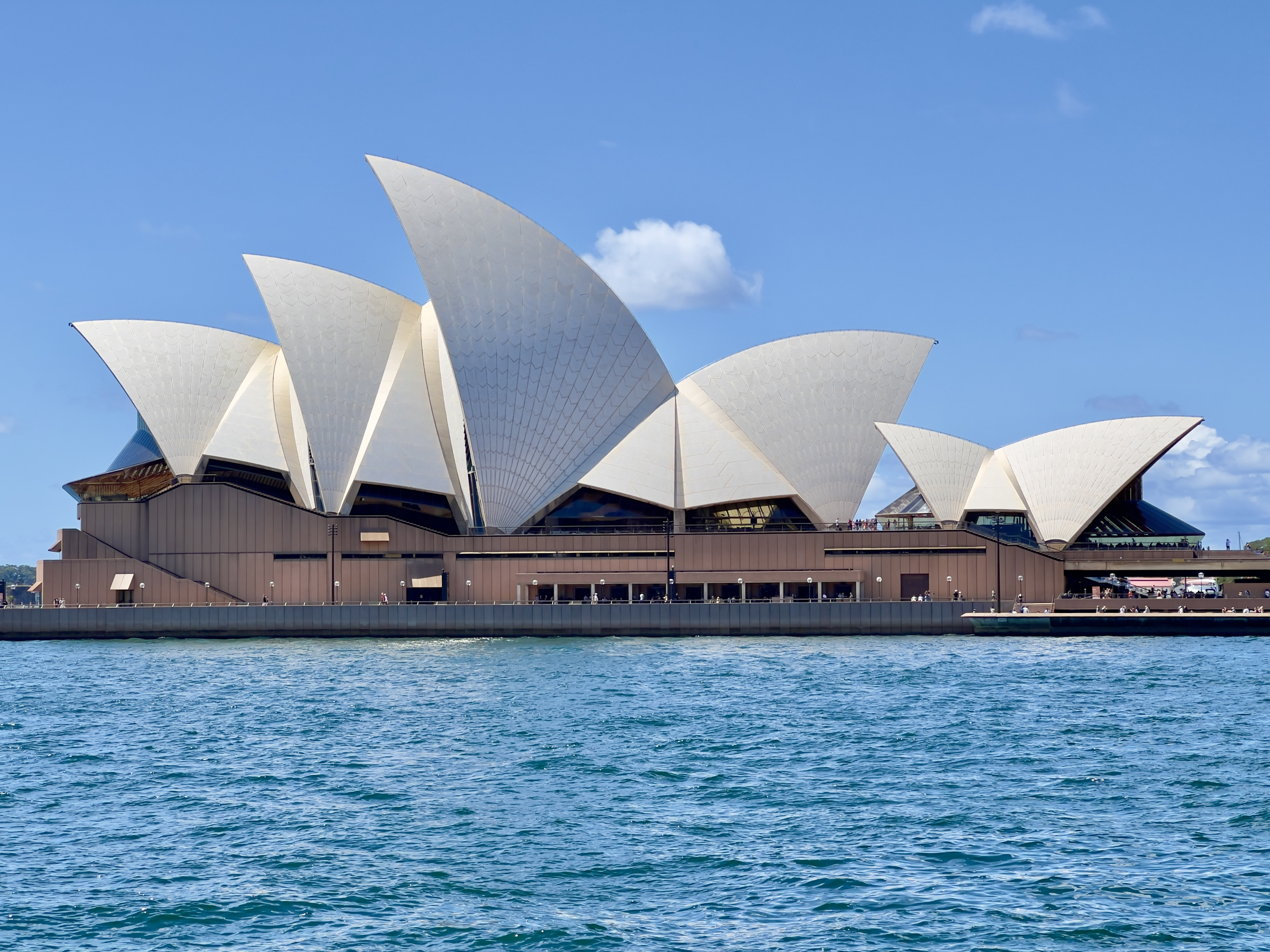
Sydney Opera House

Architecture of Australia has generally been consistent with architectural trends in the wider Western world, with some special adaptations to compensate for distinctive Australian climatic and cultural factors. Indigenous Australians produced a wide range of structures and places prior to colonisation. Contemporary Indigenous practitioners are active in a broad range of built environment fields. During Australia's early Western history, it was a collection of British colonies in which architectural styles were strongly influenced by British designs. However, the unique climate of Australia necessitated adaptations, and 20th-century trends reflected the increasing influence of American architecture.

Iconic Australian designs include the UNESCO listed Sydney Opera House, Melbourne Royal Exhibition Building, Brisbane City Hall and the 11 remnant penal colony sites selected for World Heritage protection in 2010.

Towards the Federation of Australia there was a concerted movements to create a distinctively Australian styles along with the Australian nationalism movement, some of which incorporated decorative Australiana. While these attempts were largely unsuccessful due in part to cultural cringe, distinctively Australian styles of architecture had already evolved organically. Notable Australian architectural adaptations include the Queenslander and Federation styles of residential architecture.

== History ==
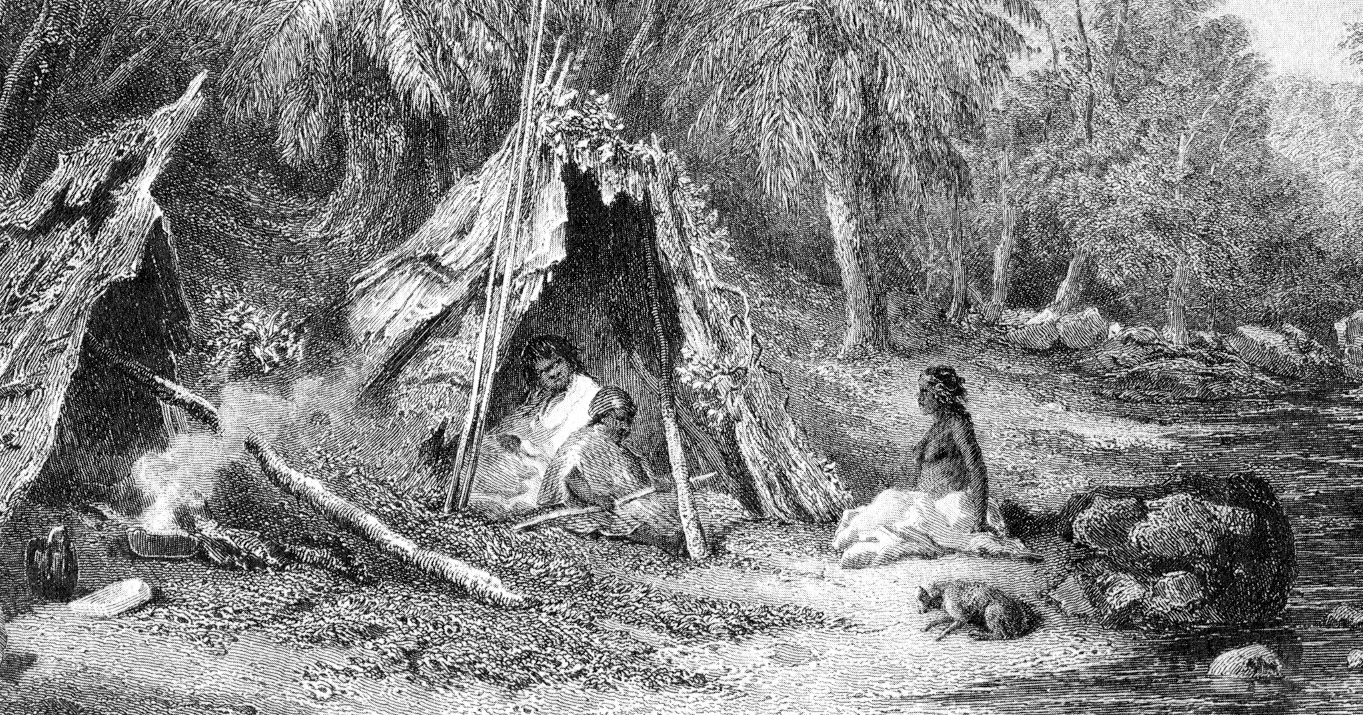
A 19th-century engraving of an indigenous Australian encampment, representing the Indigenous mode of life in the cooler parts of Australia before the arrival of Europeans

In the period before European settlement of Australia, there were forms of Indigenous architecture across Australia. Early colonists and explorers including Sir Thomas Mitchell and Charles Sturt recorded many Indigenous building styles including stone houses and houses grouped in villages. As a British colony, the first European buildings were derivative of the European fashions of the time. As most of the colonialists were from England the first buildings reflected English ideas.

Georgian architecture is seen in early government buildings and the homes of the wealthy. The architect Francis Greenway, who appears on the Australian ten-dollar note designed early buildings in the Georgian style. Examples include the Hyde Park Barracks, St James' Church and St Matthew's Church at Windsor.

Another European style to gain favour in 19th century Australia, particularly in churches, was Gothic Revival architecture. Pointed arches, turrets, battlements and gothic ornaments could also be found on bank, insurance offices, university buildings and homes. One of the best examples of this style can be seen at the lower end of Collins Street in Melbourne.

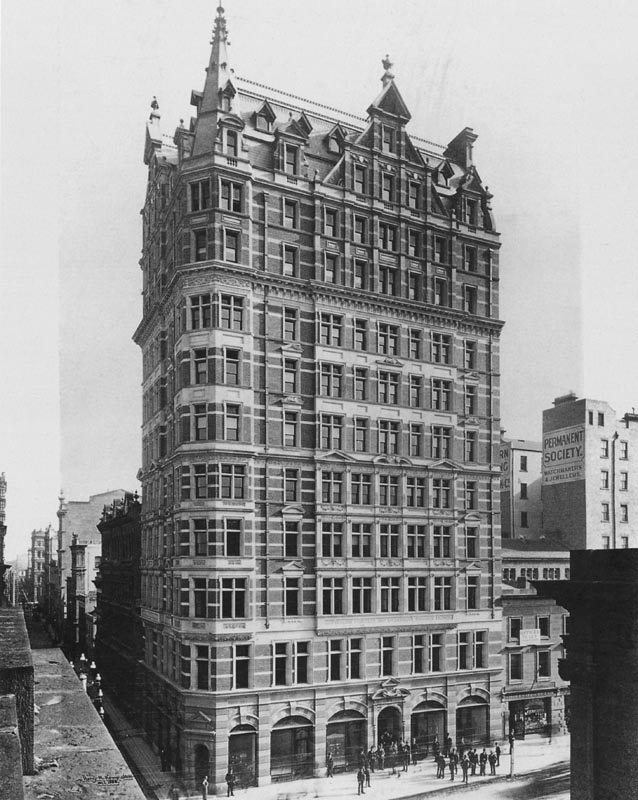
Australian cities suffered from lax or nonexistent heritage preservation and protection, resulting in widespread loss of prominent early architectural styles–for example, Melbourne's Queen Anne style APA Building, built in 1889, was one of the world's tallest buildings in the 1890s but was demolished in the contemporary-conscious early 1980s.

With the Australian gold rushes of the mid-19th-century major buildings, largely in Melbourne and Sydney and to a lesser extent in regional capitals such as Ballarat and Bendigo were built in the style of Victorian architecture. From about 1850 to 1893 Italianate architecture was also popular as it allowed greater displays of prosperity through rich and ornate decorate features such as cast iron lace work and slate roofs. Towards the end of the century the style was pushed to an extreme by some architects. Buildings became over-burdened with excess columns, balustrades, exaggerated entrances and other lavish decorations. Medley Hall in Carlton is an example of this style which became known as the Boom Style from 1880 to 1893.

One of the most significant architectural movements in Australian architecture was the Federation architecture style of the turn of the 20th century, where Australia began to play with the idea of a "style of our own", and the modern styles of the late 20th century which sought to reject historicism.

Walter Burley Griffin was an American architect and landscape architect who, with fellow architect Marion Mahony Griffin, played a key role in designing Canberra, Australia's capital city. A legacy of their unique architecture remains in a small number of Melbourne buildings and the Sydney suburb of Castlecrag. Castlecrag was planned by the Griffins and also features a number of houses designed in the organic Modernist style they developed after the Prairie School architecture that marked his earlier career in the United States. The simple, flat-roofed cottages that the Griffins designed in Canberra used their innovative, patented techniques for concrete construction.

One of the most important local introduction to Australian architecture was the verandah. As pastoralists took up land and built solid, single story dwellings the addition of verandahs proved popular as they provided shade and looked attractive. They were often integrated into the symmetry of Georgian style homes.

Like elsewhere in the world, socio-political factors have played their roles in shaping Australian architecture. During the early 20th century, cities across Australia had placed building height limits, typically 150 feet (45 m), thus hampering the development of American-style skyscrapers until the limits were lifted in the late 1950s. Likewise the popular notion of the "Australian Dream", in which families seek to own their free-standing houses with backyards, meant that high-density housings were rare in Australia until the end of the 20th century. The design of housing in Australia after World War II, which was mostly undertaken by builders, has been described as poor aesthetically and environmentally.

Significant concern was raised during the 1960s, with green bans and heritage concerns responding to the destruction of earlier buildings and the skyscraper boom, particularly in Sydney and Melbourne, but affecting other major cities including Adelaide, Perth and Brisbane. Green bans helped to protect historic 18th-century buildings in The Rocks from being demolished to make way for office towers, and prevented the Royal Botanic Gardens from being turned into a carpark for the Sydney Opera House. In Melbourne a battle was fought to preserve historic Carlton, Victoria from slum reclamation for public housing, while gentrification played a big part in the suburb's salvation. In Melbourne's city centre, the destruction was particularly profound: Whelan the Wrecker was a family owned and operated demolition company that operated from 1892 until 1992, which became well known through the 1950s, 70s and 80s when signs stating that "Whelan the Wrecker is Here" appeared on many of the grand Victorian era buildings of Marvellous Melbourne. One of the most lamented losses in Melbourne was the Federal Coffee Palace on Collins Street and the APA Building (inspired by Chicago's early skyscrapers) at 49 Elizabeth Street. Many of the destruction occurred after the International Modernism style arrived in Australia, making Australians particularly conscious about Victorian architecture they felt was "dated".

In the 21st century, many Australian architects have taken a more avant-garde approach to design, and many buildings have emerged that are truly unique and reflective of Australia's culture and values. As a result, many Australian practices are beginning to expand their influence overseas rather than the reverse which was often the case. Melbourne is seen as the city at the forefront of design ideas. Sydney is focusing on the humanist approach tending towards minimalism and architecture in Queensland is interested in outdoor rooms and the filtering of light. Furthermore, greater appreciation for Australia's historic architecture has led to increased heritage protection for many buildings in Australia's cities, though not all buildings are protected, and some allow for façadism if the interior is unsustainable or unsafe.

== Australian architectural styles ==
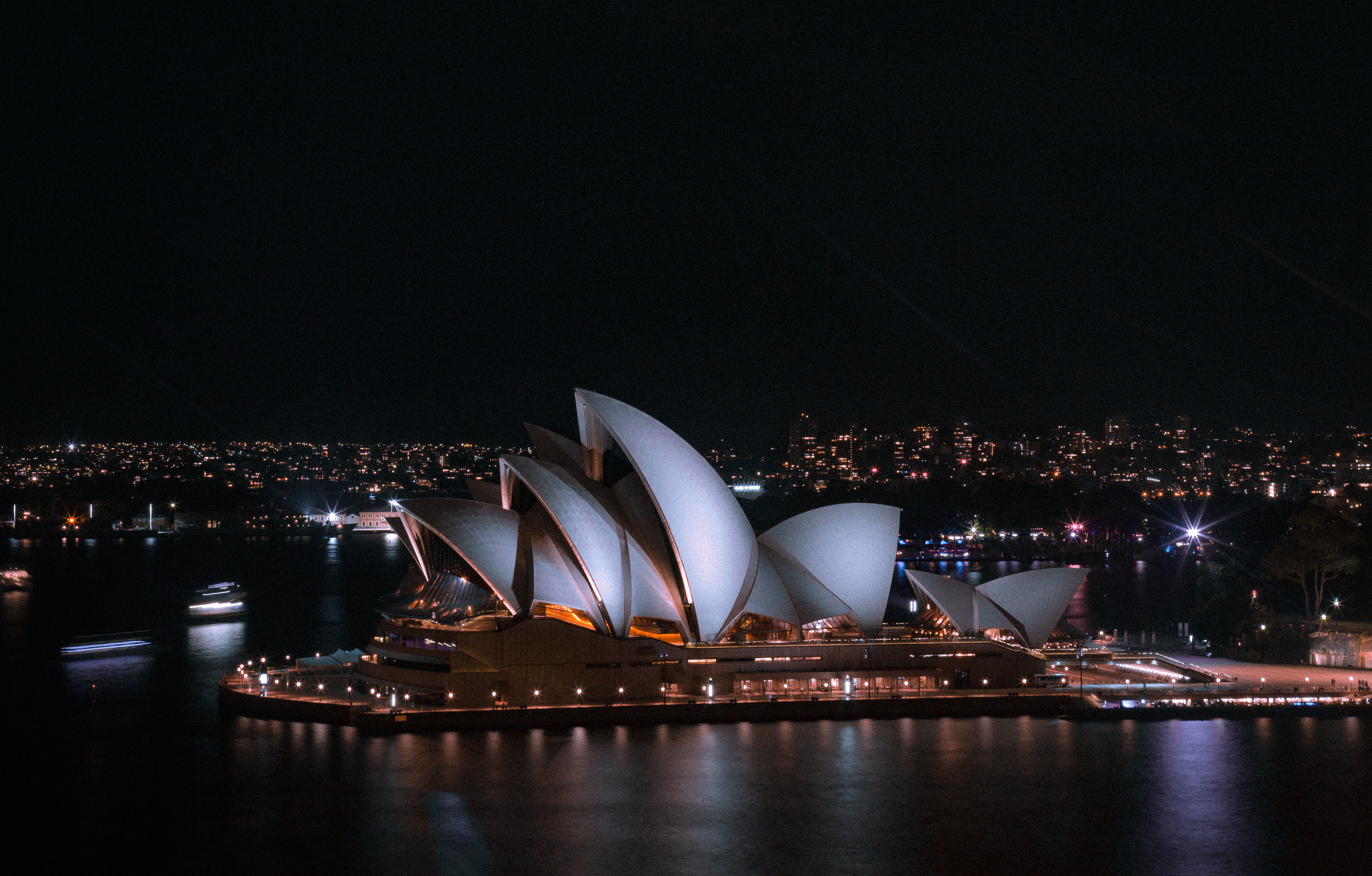
Internationally, the Sydney Opera House is the most recognised symbol of Sydney

Architectural styles have been basically exotic and derivative. Only recently have climate and environment played a major role.

During the 19th century, Australian architects were inspired by developments in England. From the 1930s on, North American and International influences started to appear.

Buildings were often heavily influenced by the origins of their patrons, hence while the British would like to be reminded of their Gothic churches and Tudoresque cottages of a perfect England, the Dutch, German, Polish, Greek, Italian and other nationalities would also attempt to recreate the architecture of their homelands.

=== Gallery ===
==== Victorian ====
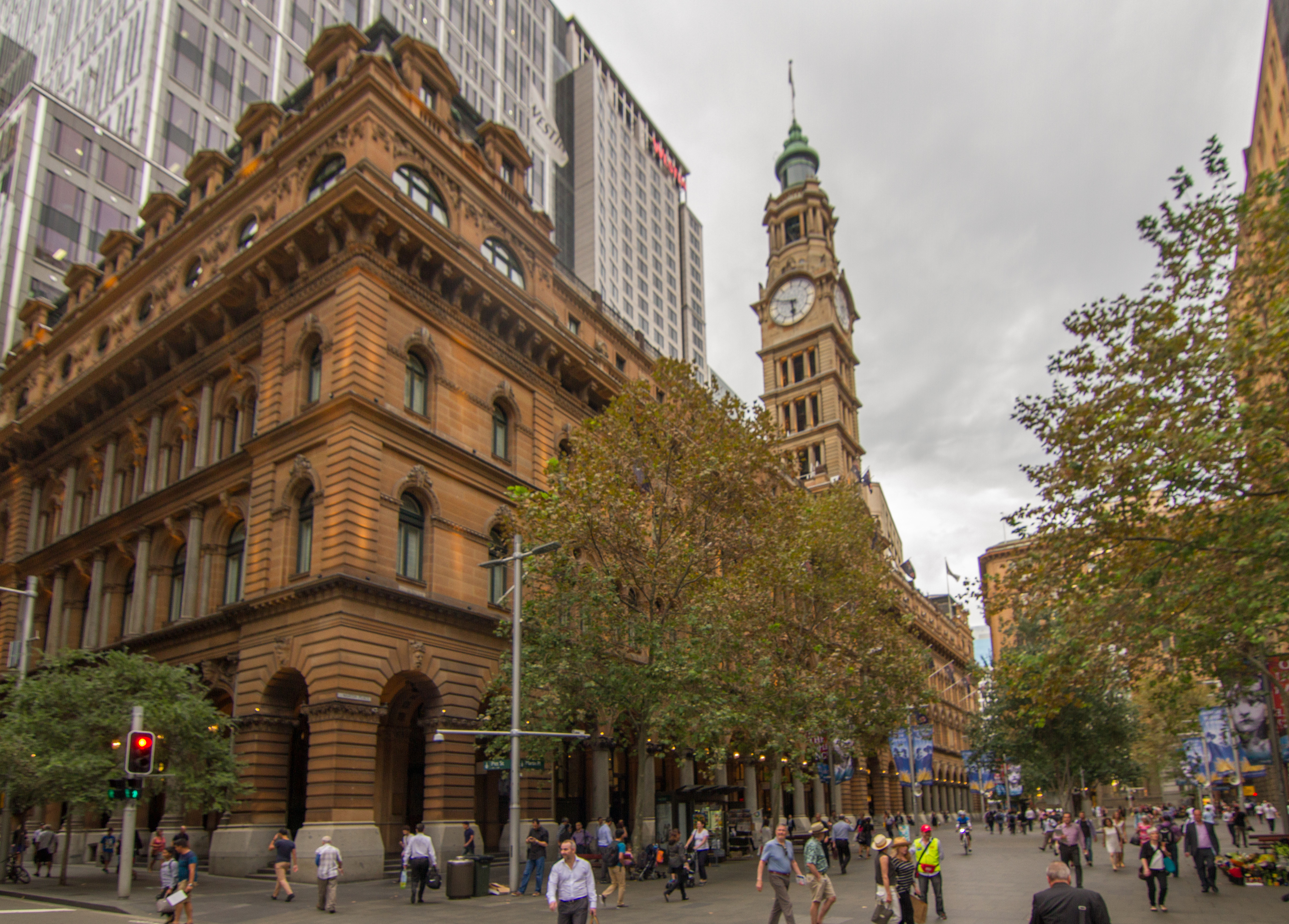
Sydney General Post Office, with an ornate mansard roof and clock tower (1891)

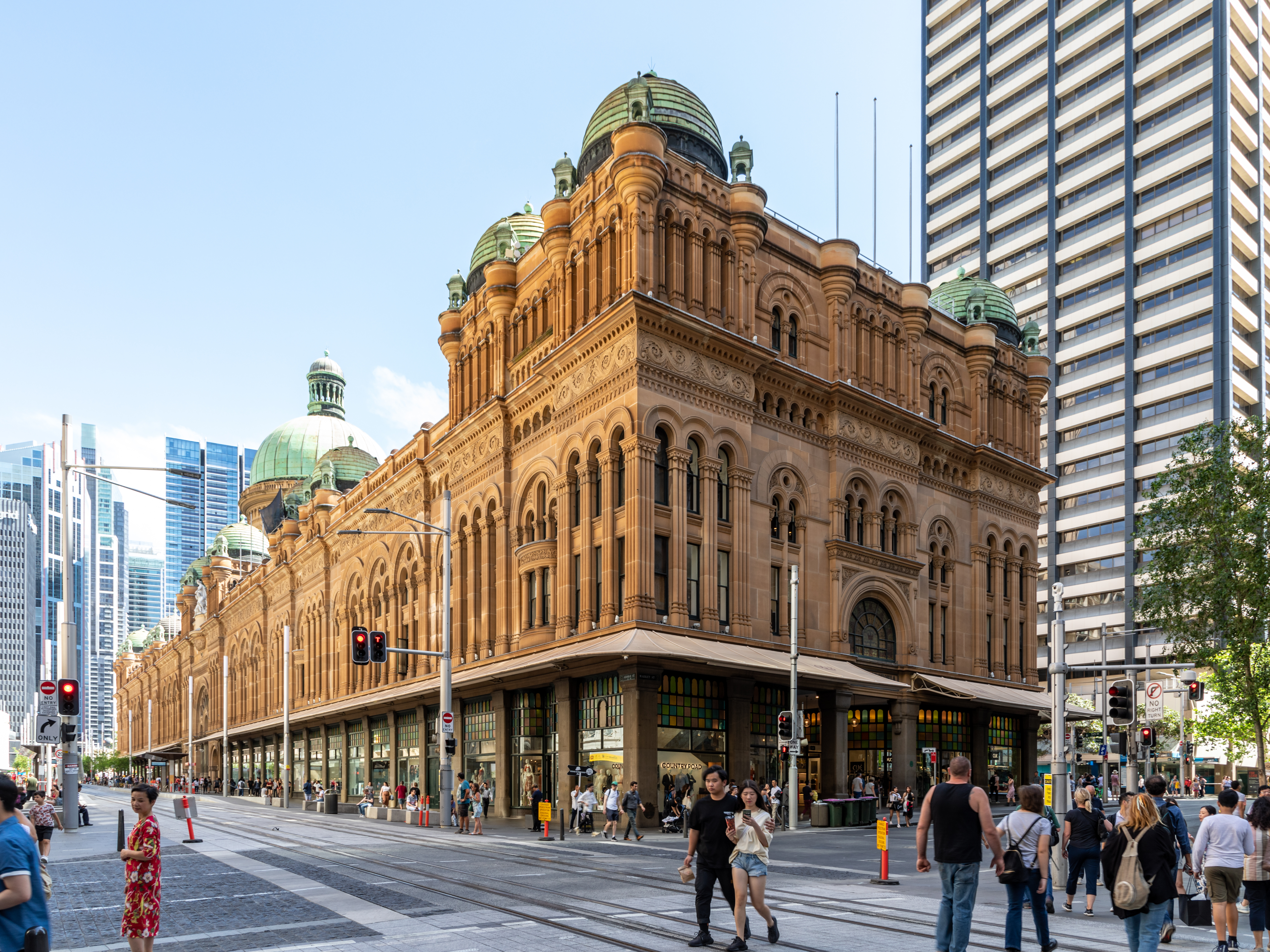
The Queen Victoria Building (1898), Sydney

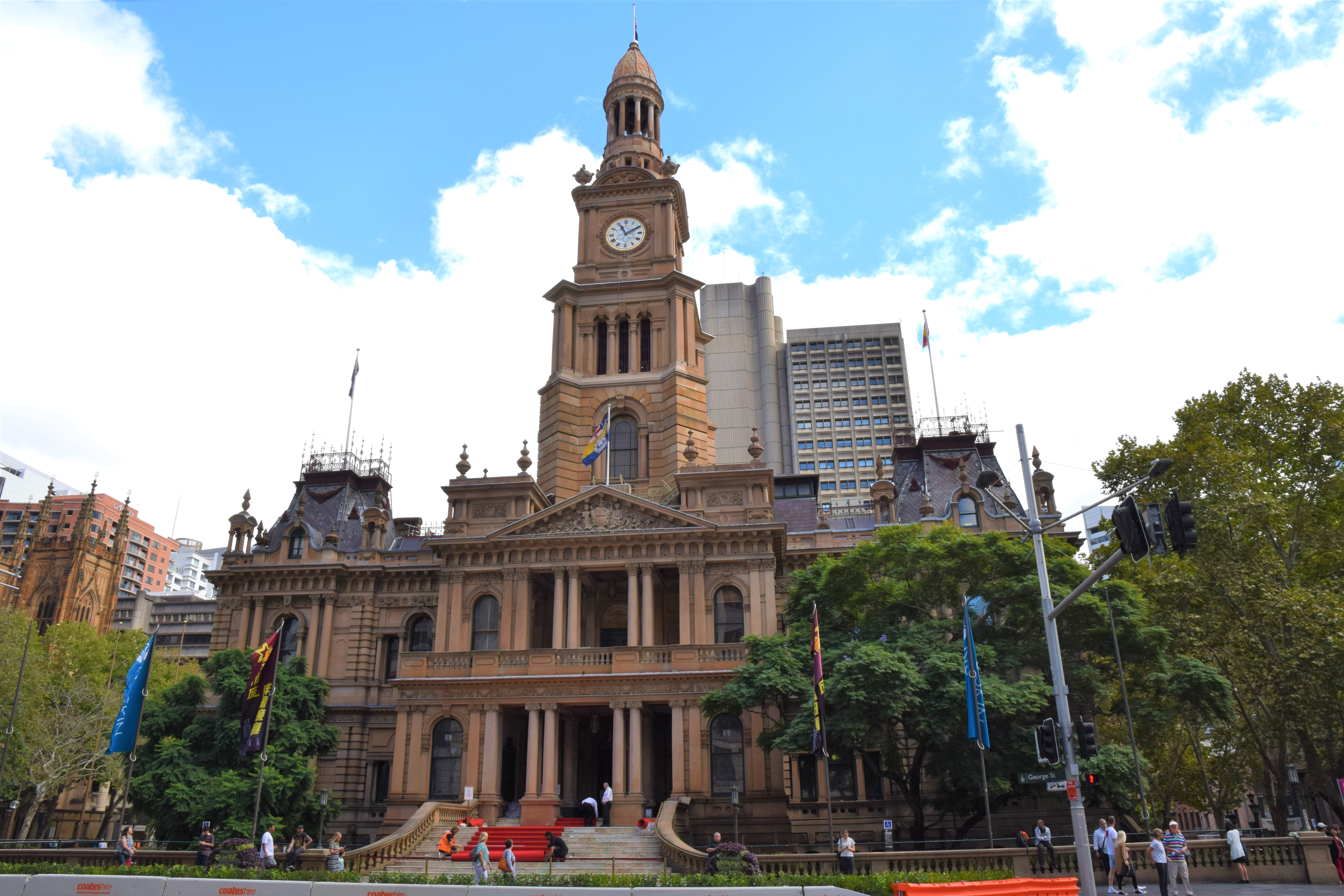
The Sydney Town Hall (1886)

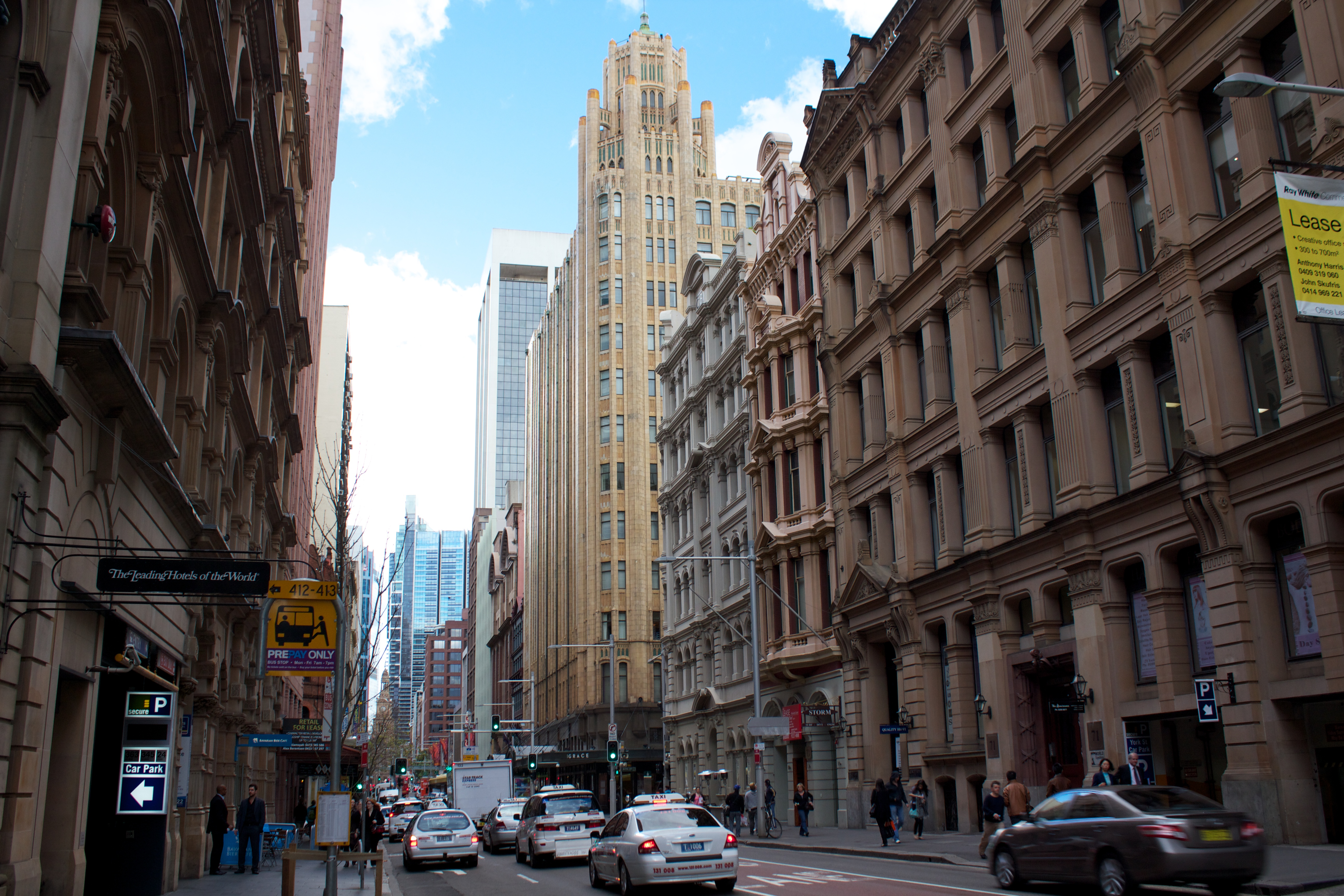
A mix of various Victorian styles along Sydney's York Street

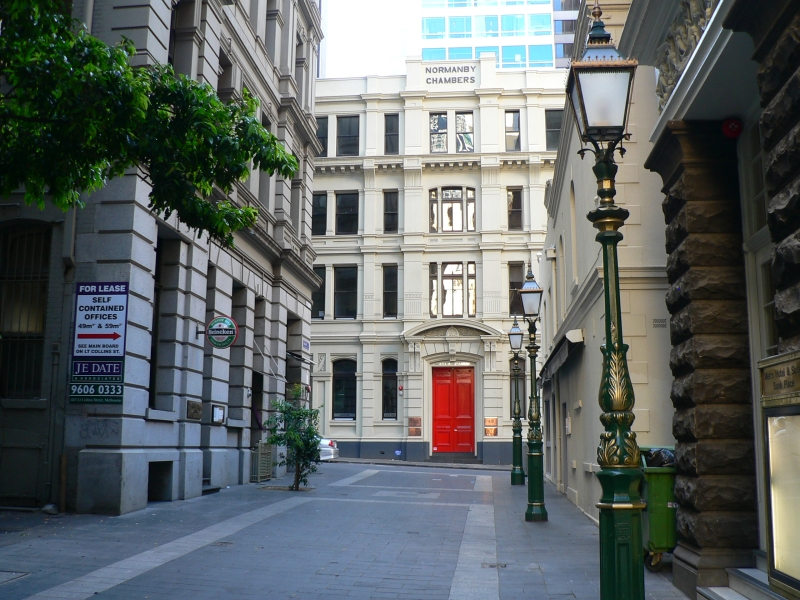
Victorian architecture featuring ornate heritage lamp posts and bluestone alleys in Bank Place, Melbourne.

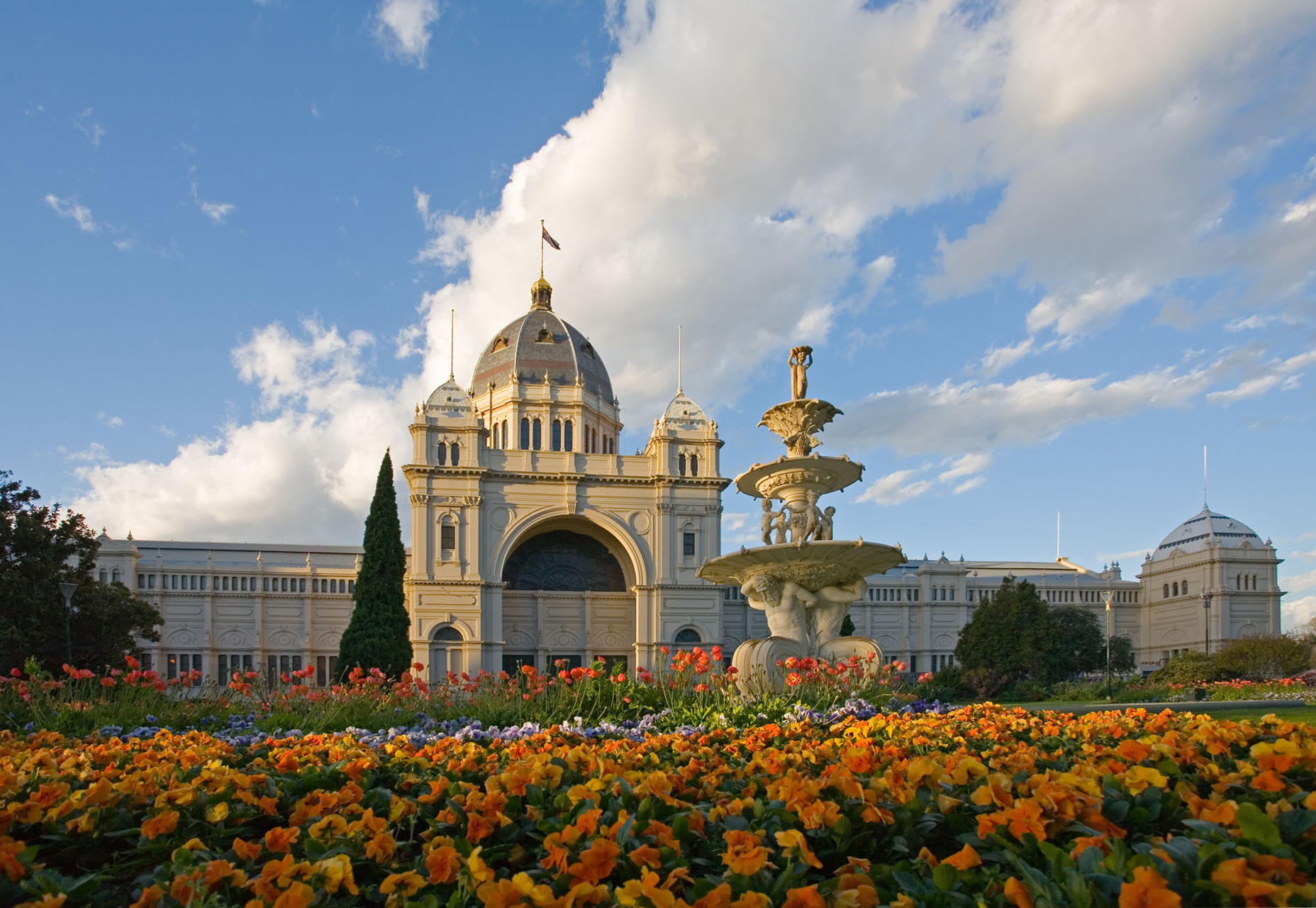
The Royal Exhibition Building in Melbourne, built for the 1880s World's Fair is on the World Heritage Register

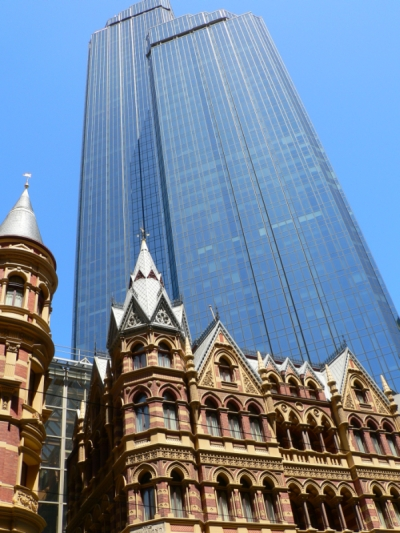
Collins Street, Melbourne 19th-century "boom style" buildings contrast with 20th-century corporate skyscrapers in urban Australia

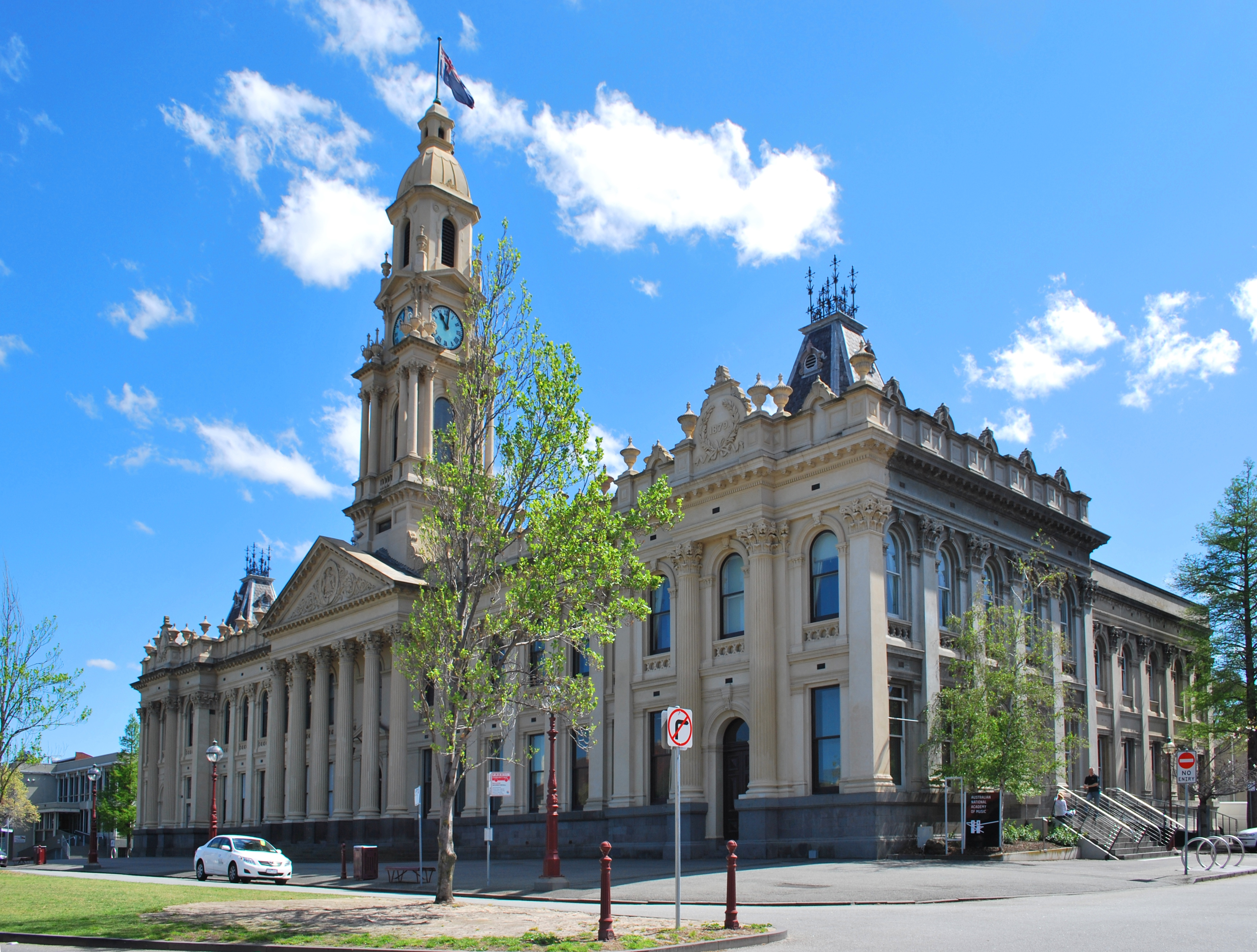
South Melbourne Town Hall (1879)

==== Post-modernism ====
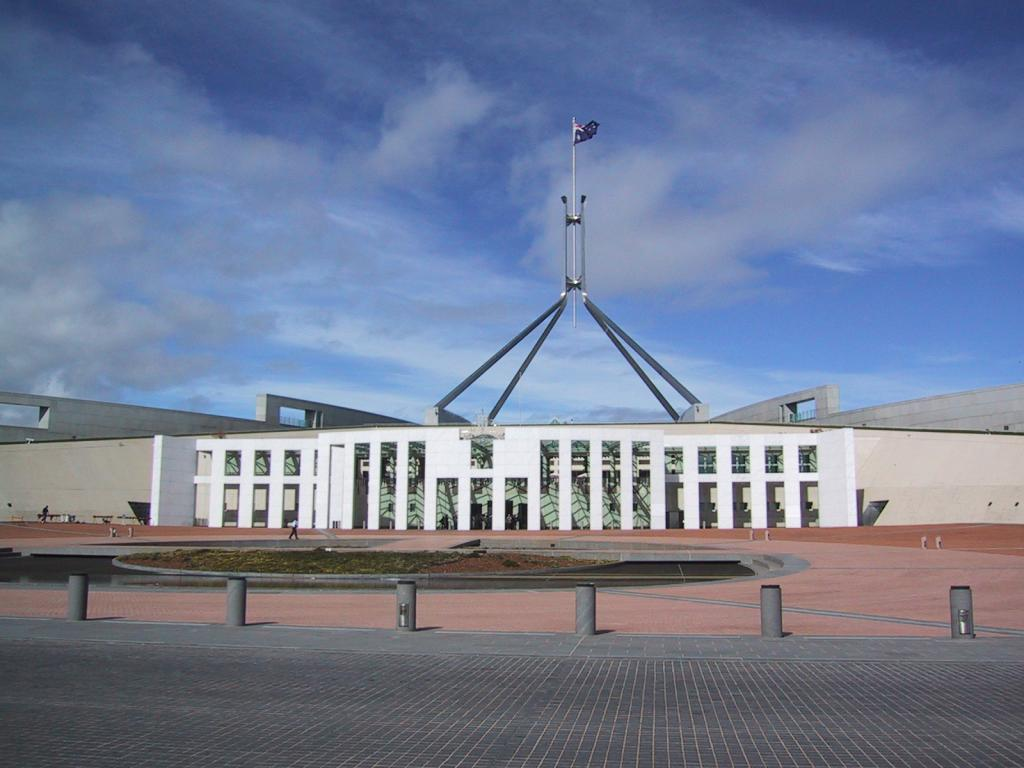
Parliament House, Canberra: The main entrance and the flag

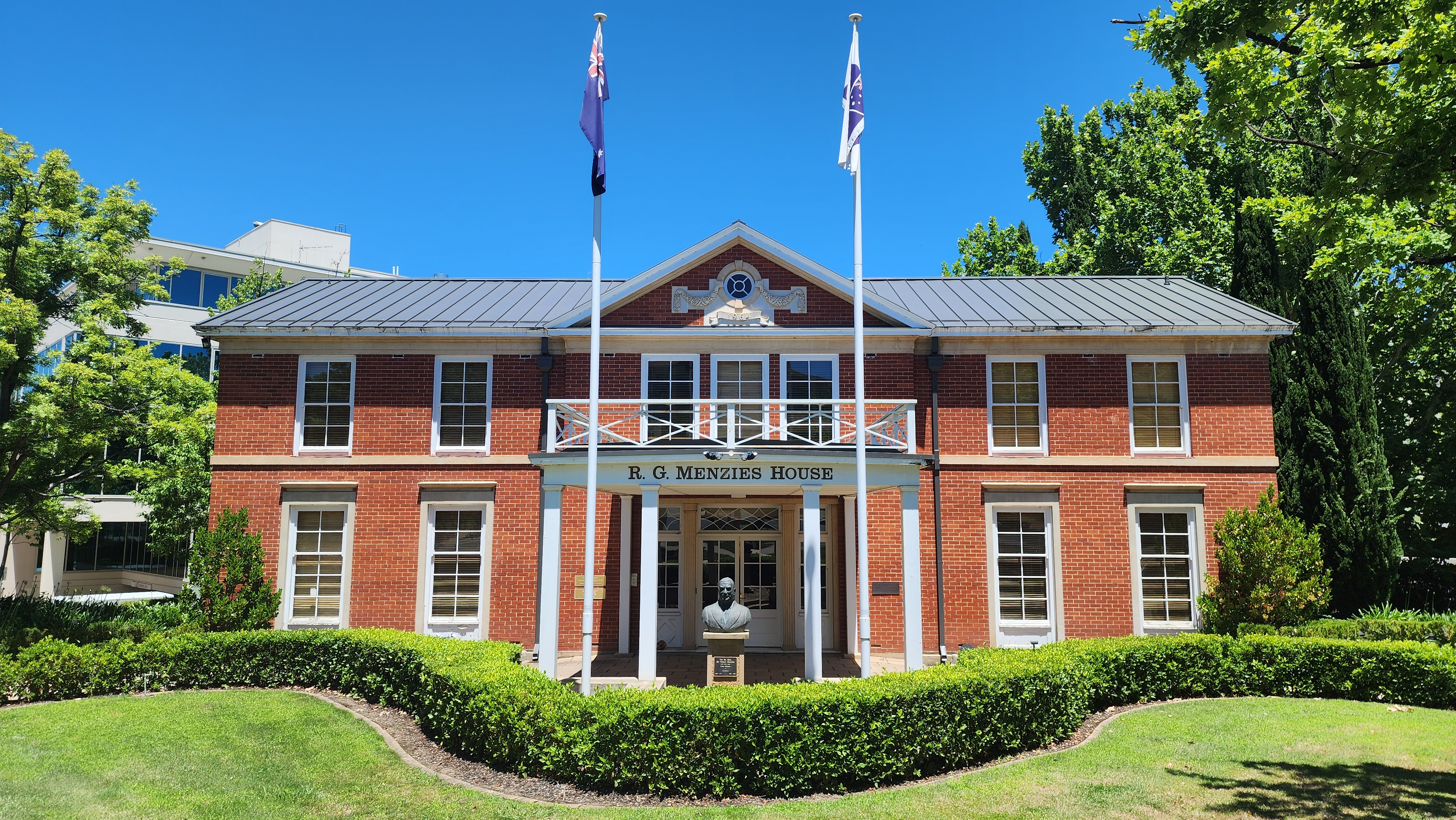
Australian architecture is characterised largely by an international style with moderate alterations, such as the colonial style R.G. Menzies House in Canberra. This is a modern recreation of early American Colonial.

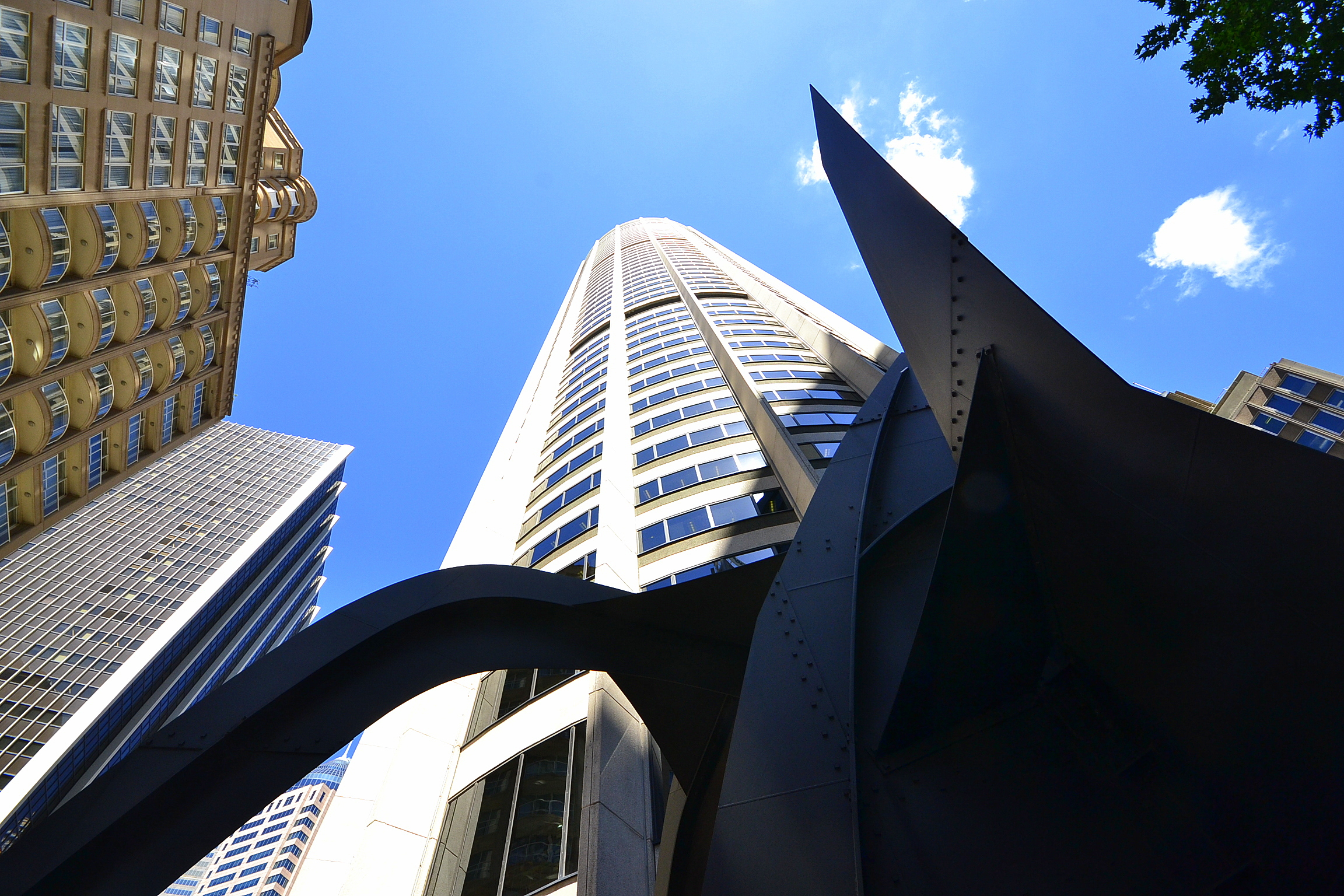
Australia Square in Sydney, emblematic of 1960s modernism, was designed by Harry Seidler.

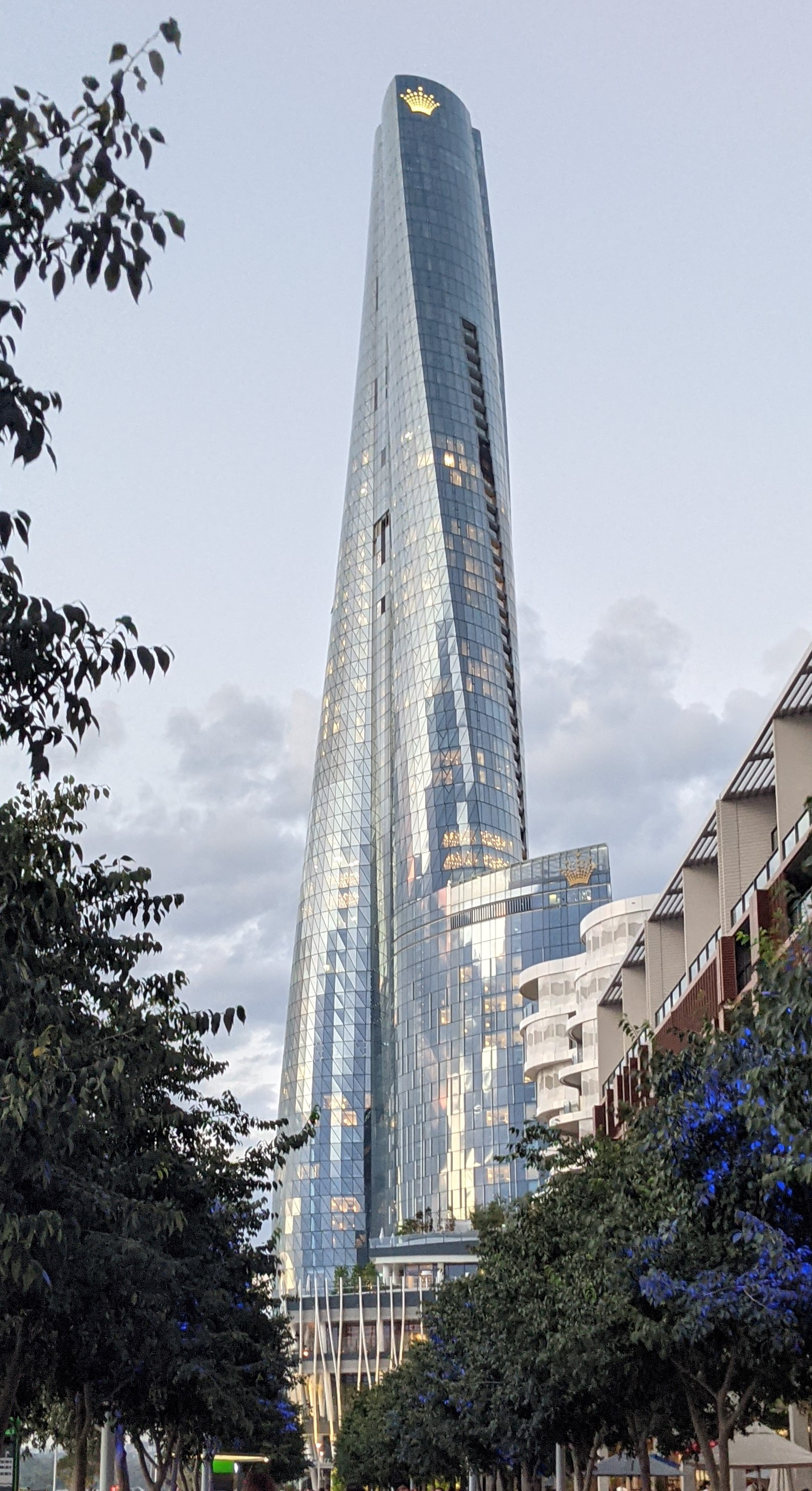
Crown Sydney

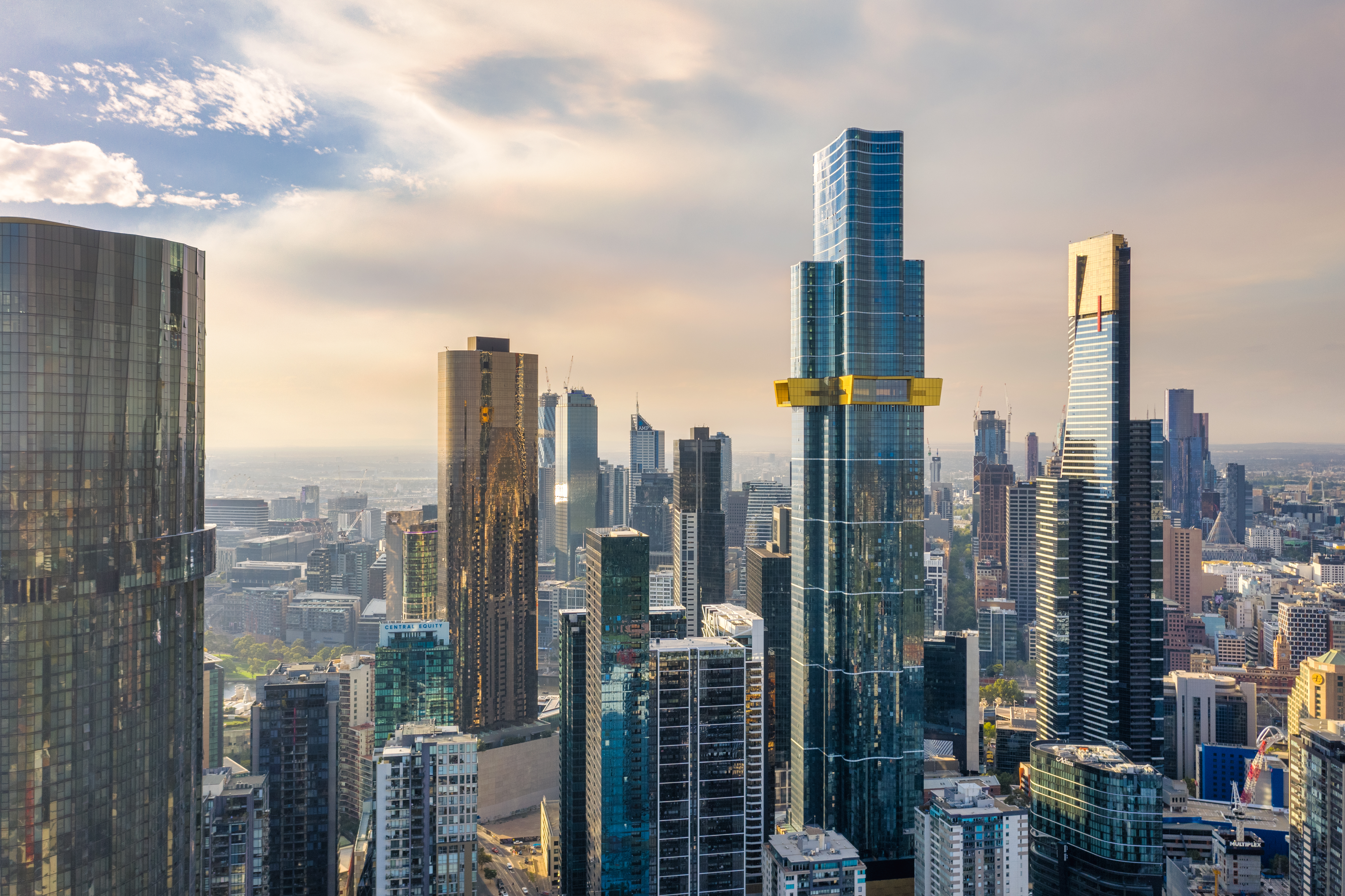
Melbourne is home to 71 skyscrapers, the two tallest being Australia 108 (left), the Southern Hemisphere's only 100-plus-storey building, and Eureka Tower (right).

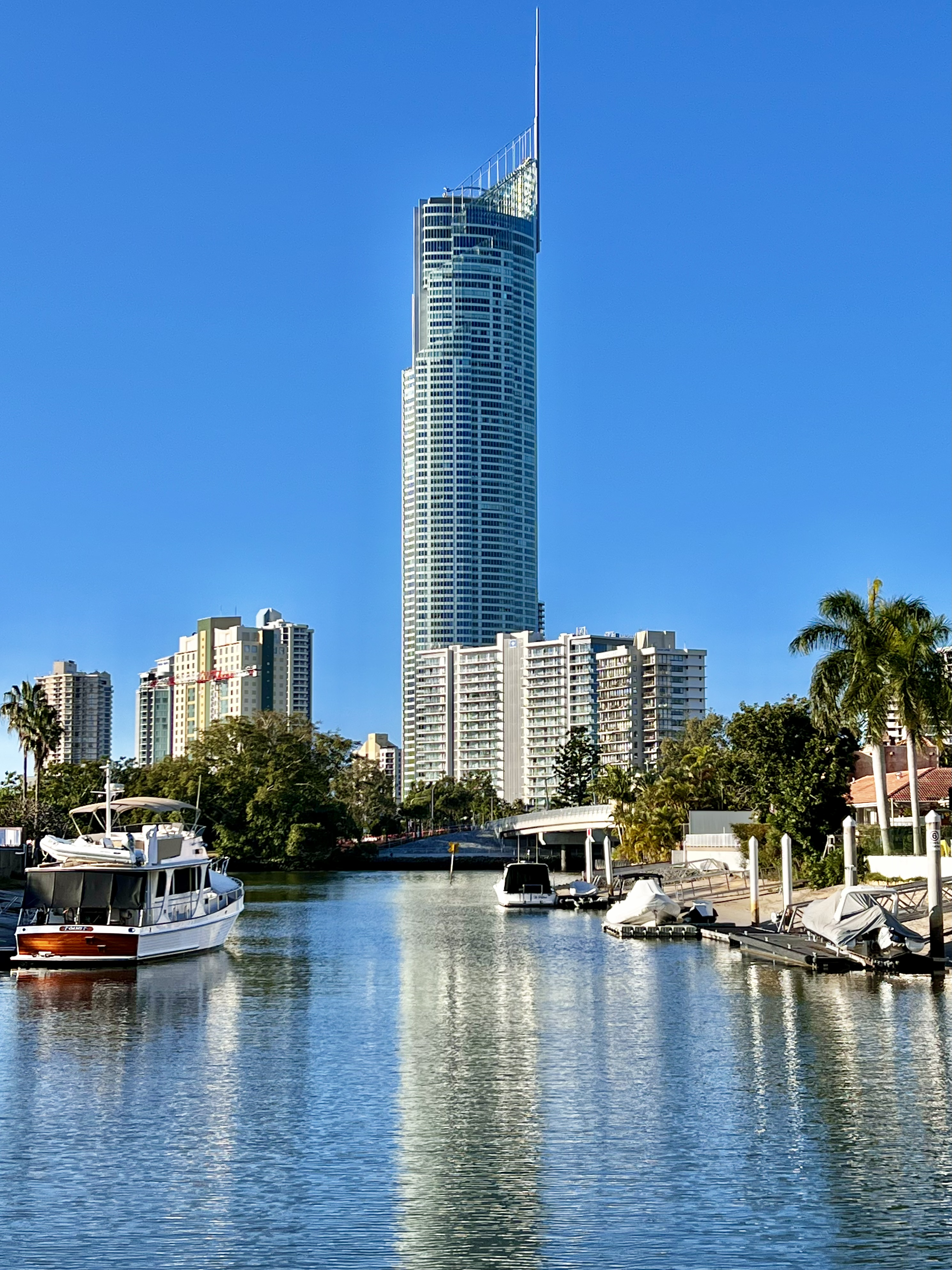
Q1, Gold Coast, Queensland

==== Residential ====
Beach house

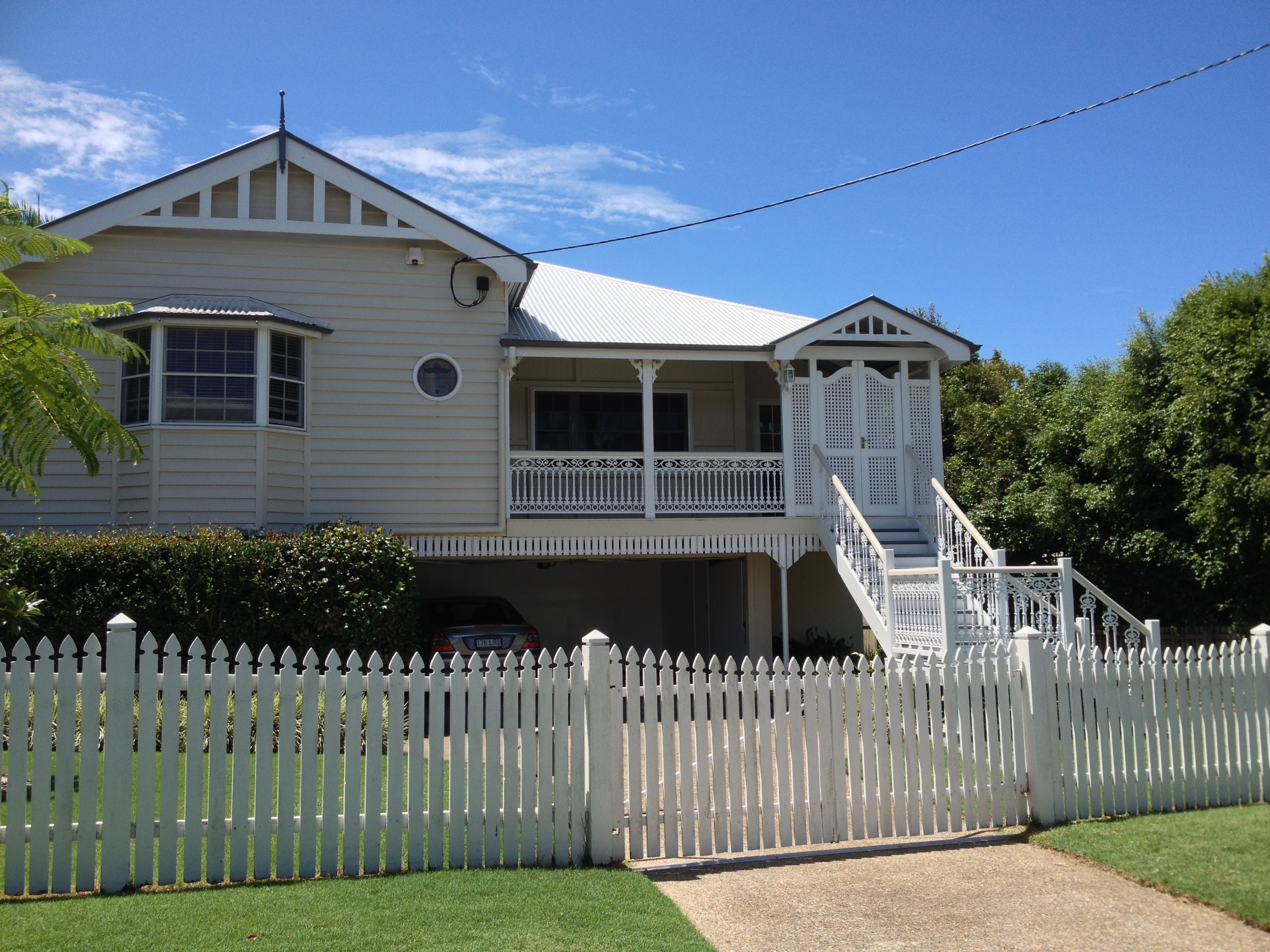
A typical Queenslander house in Ascot, Queensland; a unique regional style influenced by location and climate

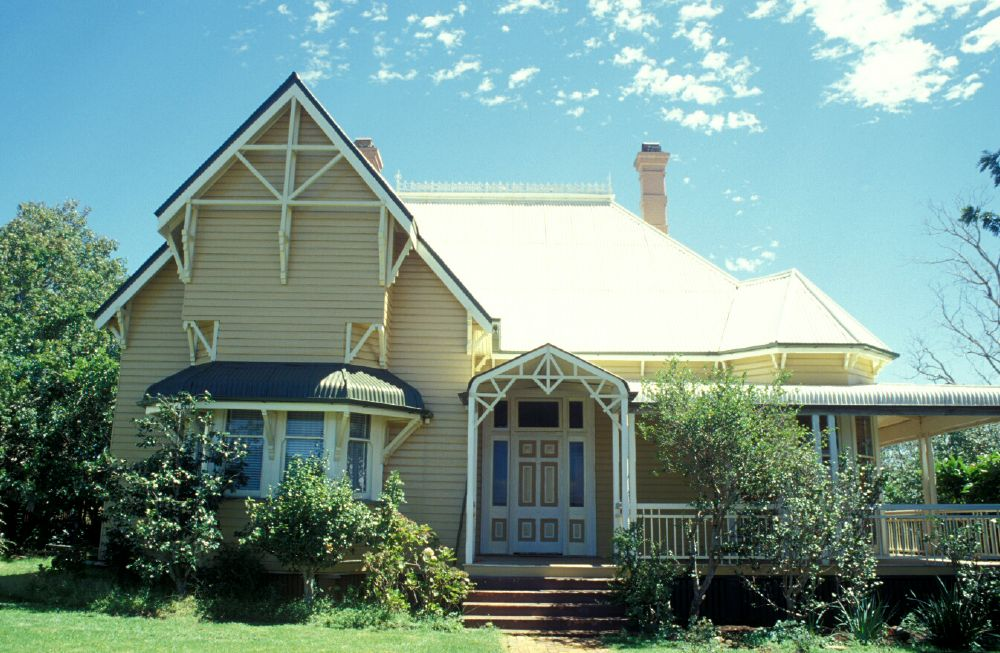
Oak Lodge in Toowoomba, a weatherboard villa.

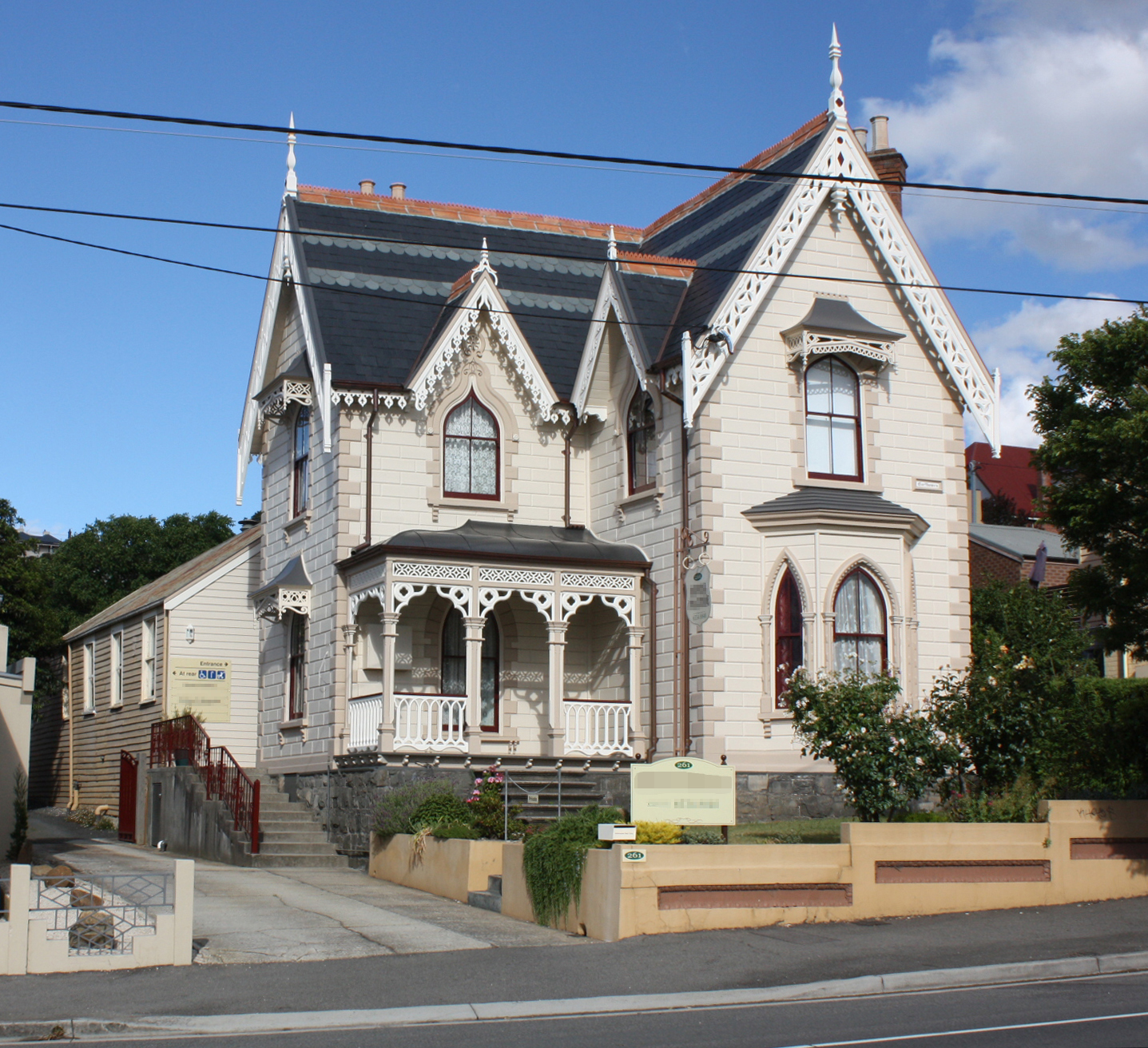
The Gothic Revival "Garthowen" in Launceston, Tasmania

Simms House, Cammeray, Sydney, c. 1945

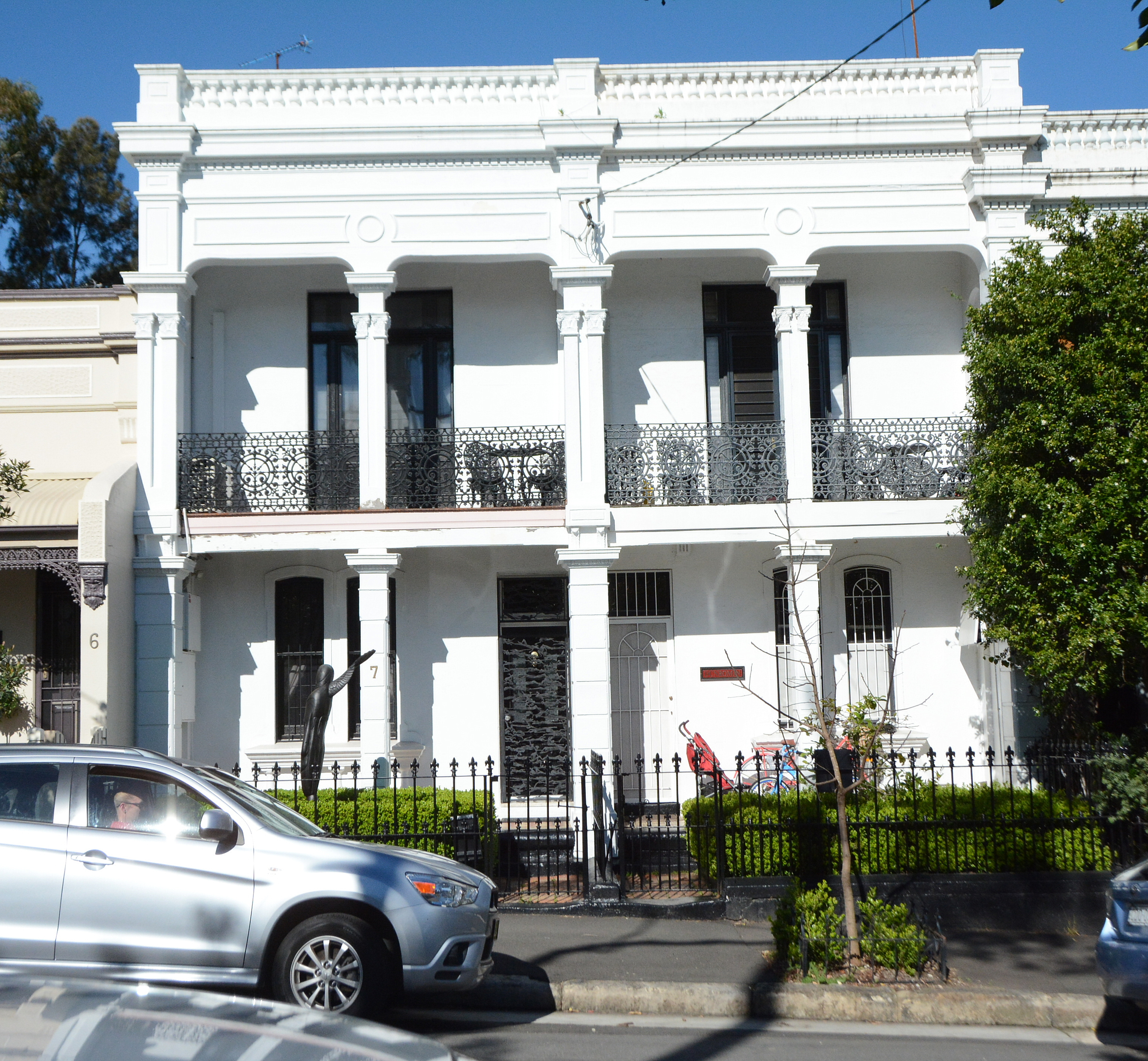
Italianate terrace houses in Erskineville, New South Wales

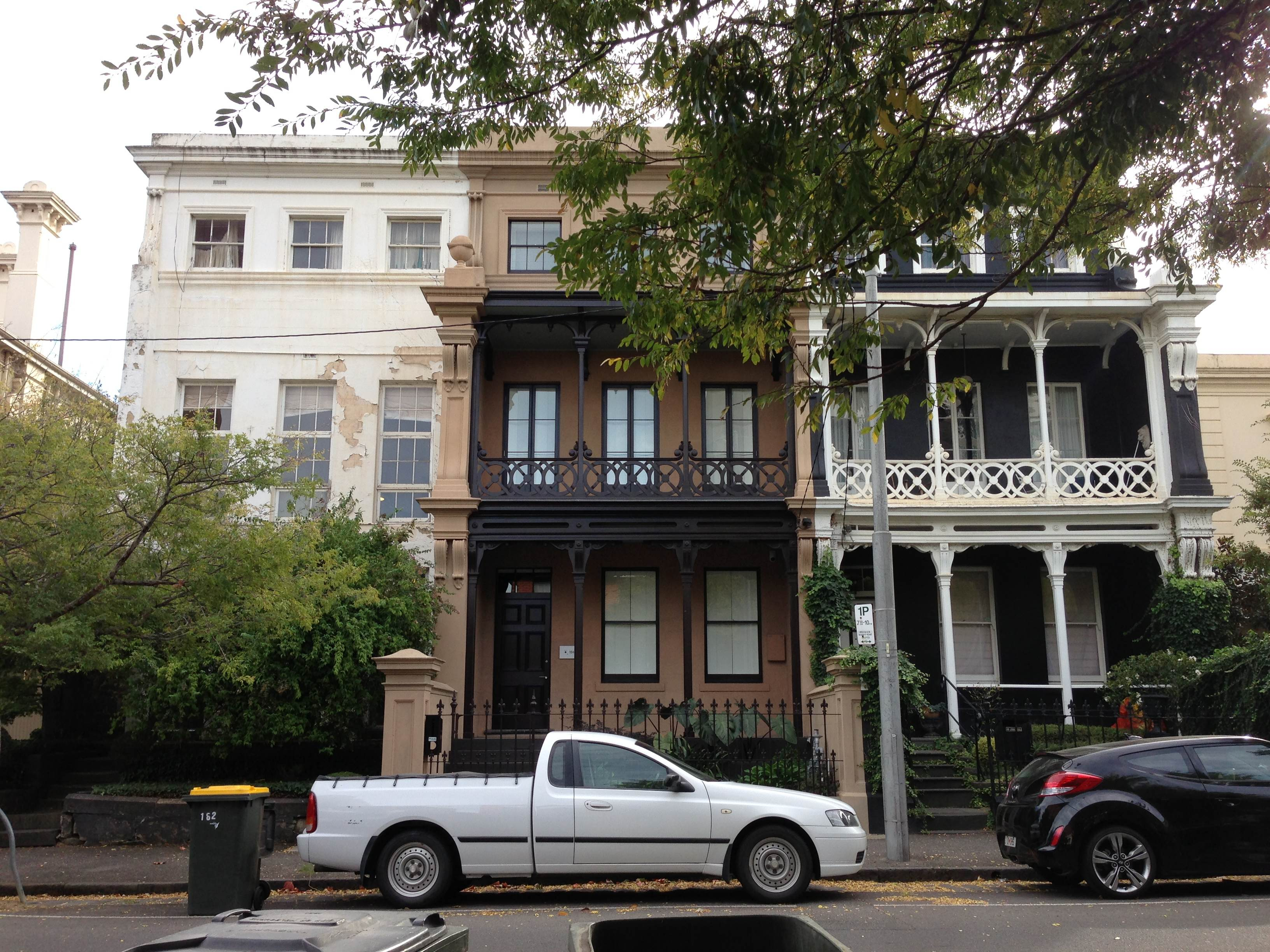
19th-century three-storey Victorian terrace houses in East Melbourne.

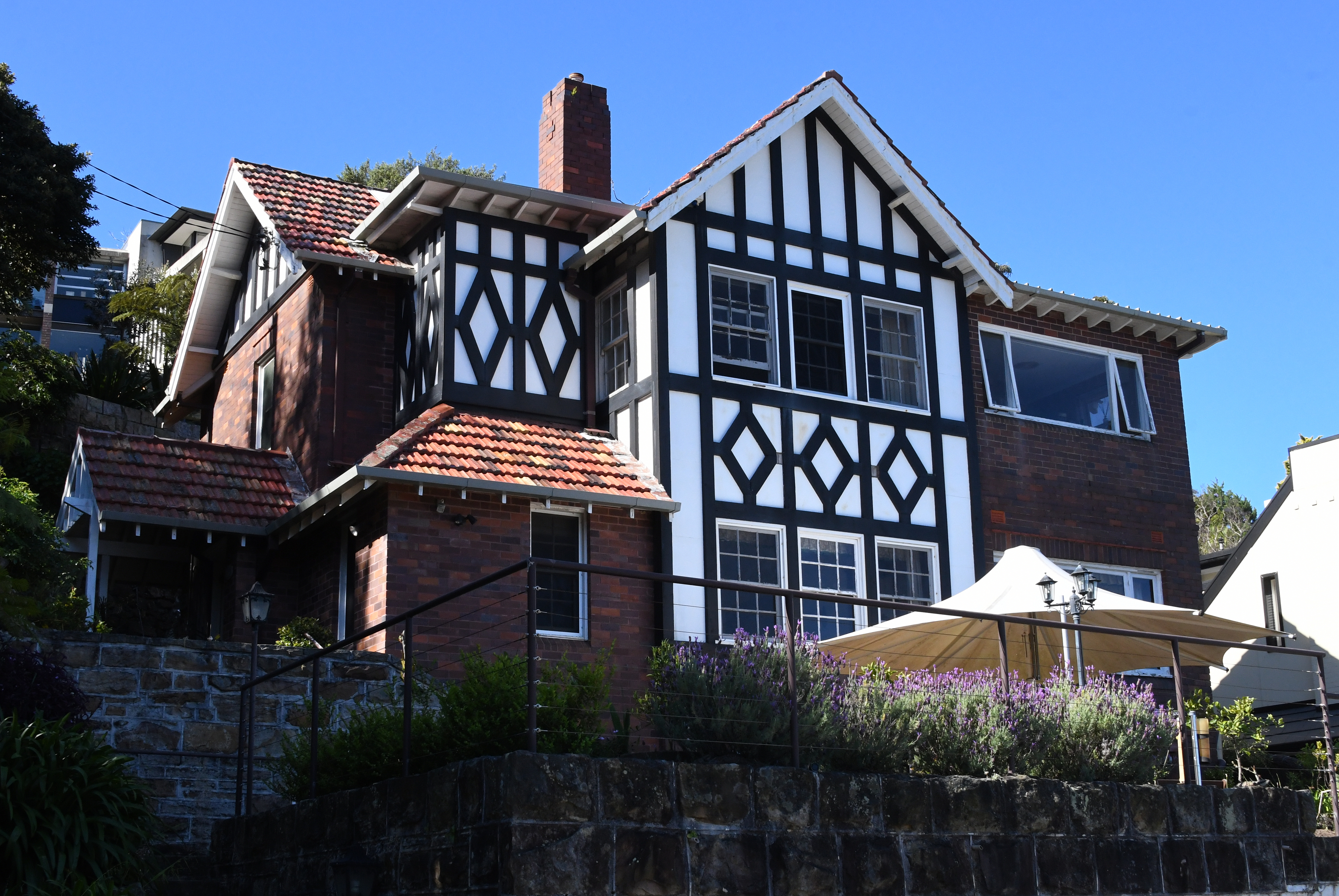
Tudor house in Mosman, New South Wales

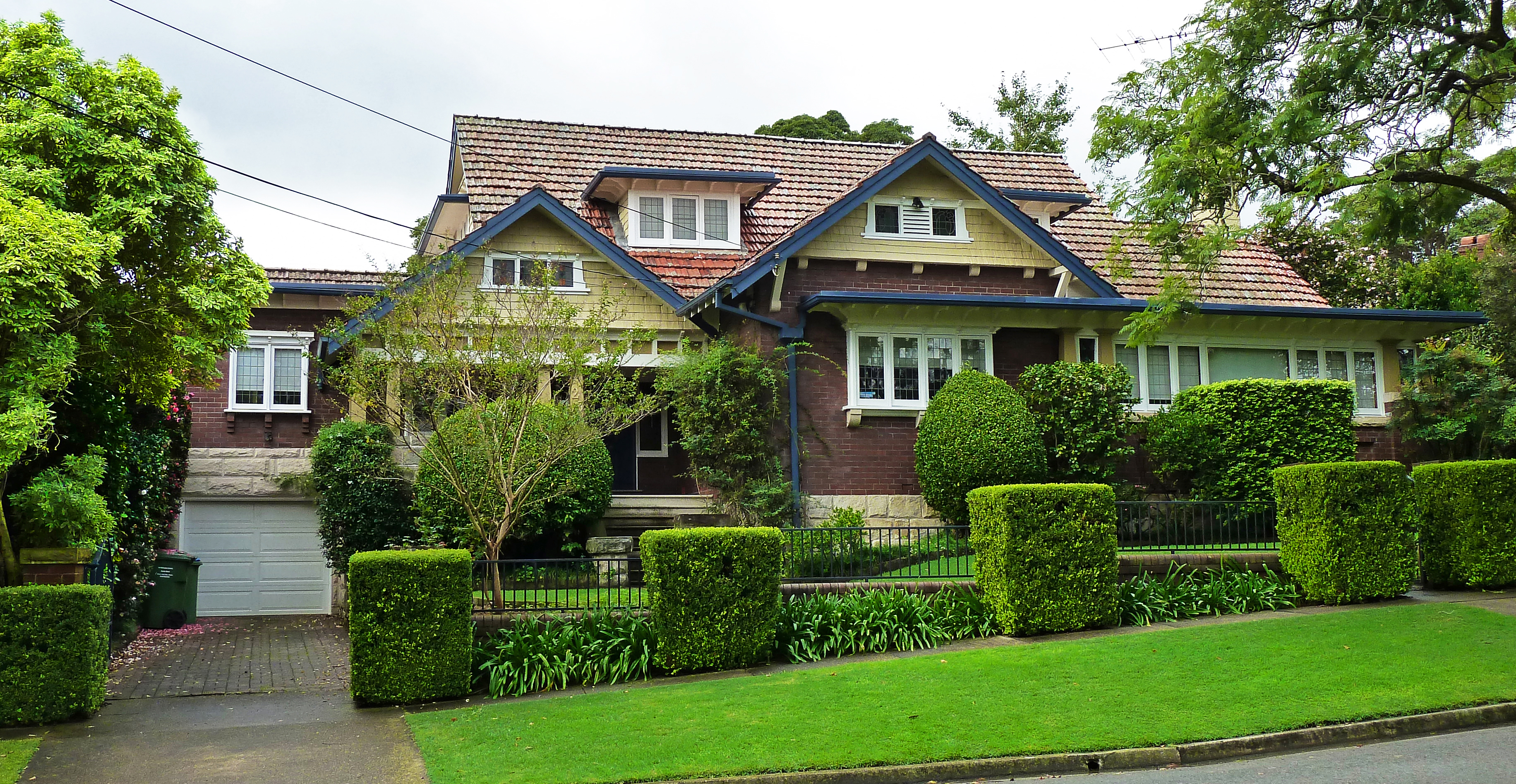
Arts and Crafts shingle and bungalow-inspired style home in the Sydney suburb of Lindfield on the Upper North Shore

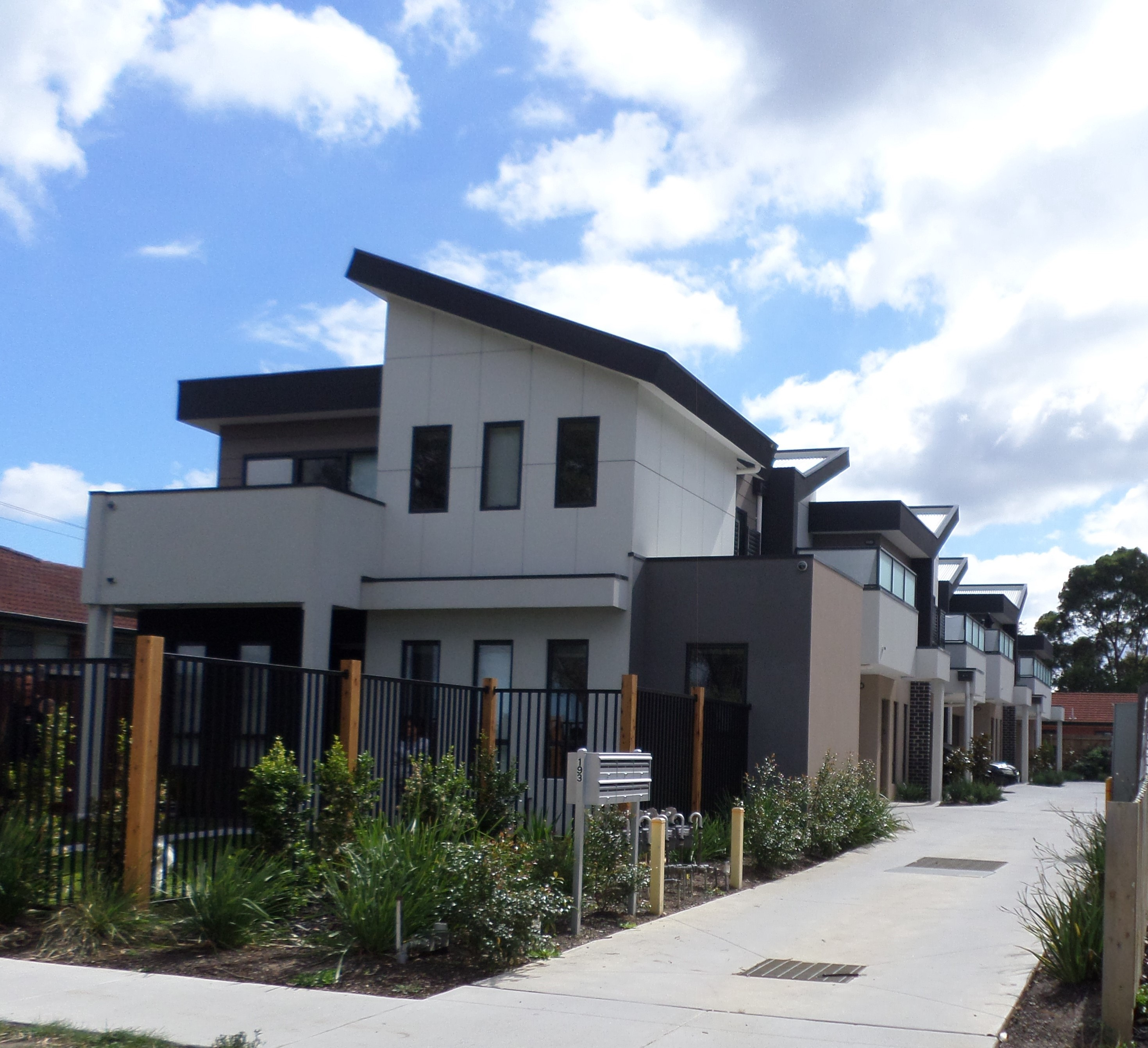
Modern townhouses in Boronia, Victoria on a subdivided plot of land.

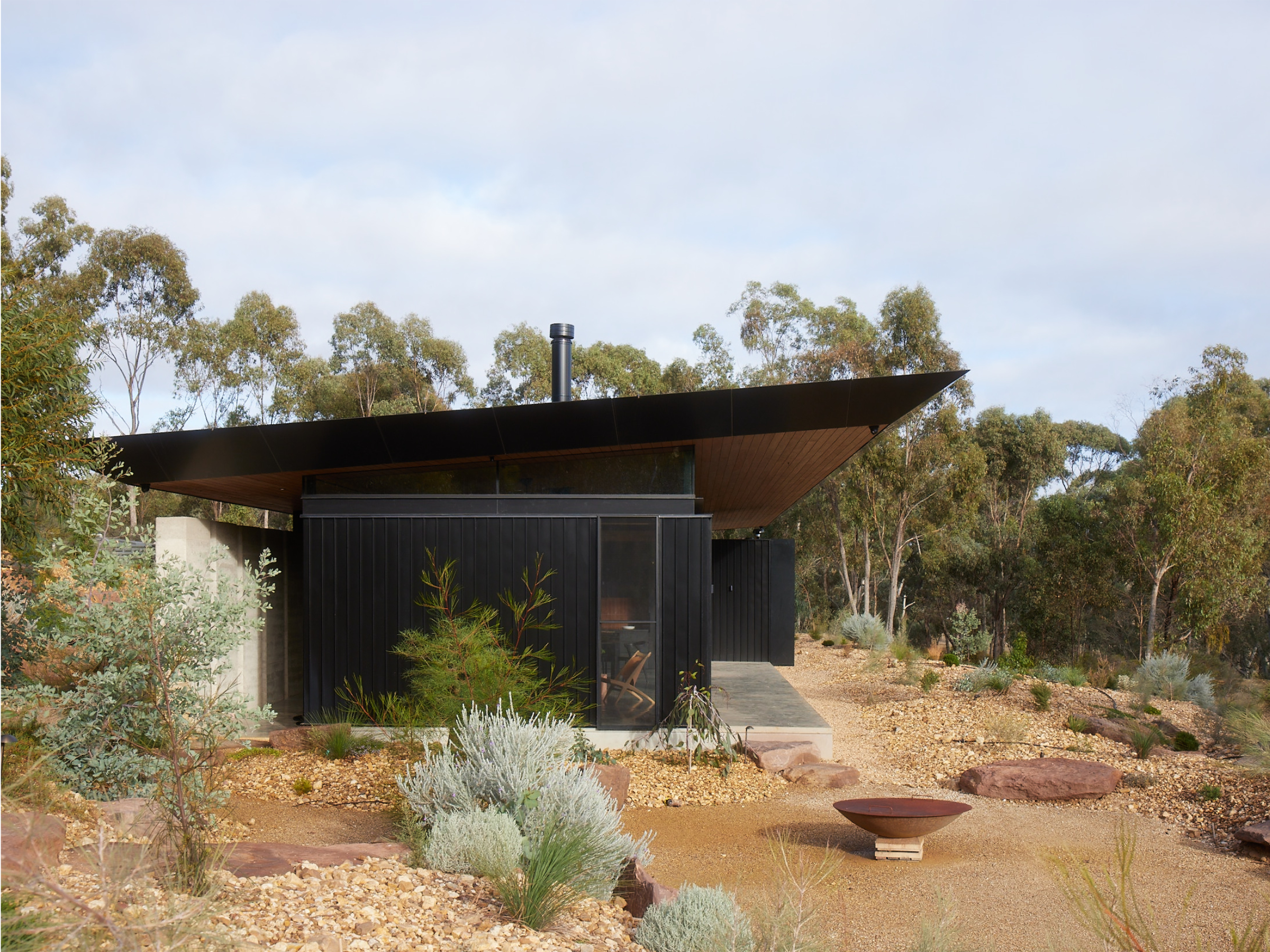
Modern beach house in St Andrews Beach, Victoria

== Australian architects ==
Fraction of over 15 year olds with a qualification in architecture or building by Statistical Local Area as of the 2011 Australian Census

Significant architects include:

- Robin Boyd
- John James Clark
- Francis Greenway
- Roy Grounds
- Neville Gruzman
- Harry Howard
- Bryce Mortlock
- Glenn Murcutt
- John Horbury Hunt
- Nonda Katsalidis
- Joseph Reed
- Harry Seidler
- Walter Liberty Vernon
- Mortimer Lewis
- George McRae
- Howard Joseland
- James Barnet
- Lily Isabel Maude Addison
- Edmund Blacket
- Beverley Ussher
- Muir and Shepherd
- Ruth Alsop
- Brit Andresen
- Beverley Bolin
- Eva Buhrich
- Stroma Buttrose
- Kerry and Lindsay Clare
- Louise Cox
- Eleanor Cullis-Hill
- Suzanne Dance
- Maggie Edmond
- Rosina Edmunds
- Zahava Elenberg
- Cassandra Fahey
- Margaret Feilman
- Margaret Findlay
- Abbie Galvin
- Jill Garner
- Eli Giannini
- Eileen Good
- Kristin Green
- Marion Mahony Griffin
- Winsome Hall Andrew
- Laura Harding
- Ellison Harvie
- Beatrice Hutton
- Louise St John Kennedy
- Helen Lochhead
- Bill and Ruth Lucas
- Kirsteen Mackay
- Nellie McCredie
- Margaret Pitt Morison
- Elina Mottram
- Phyllis Murphy
- Andrea Nield
- Ellice Nosworthy
- Alexis Ord
- Shelley Penn
- Christine Phillips
- Susan Phillips
- Caroline Pidcock
- Dimity Reed
- Penelope Seidler
- Mary Turner Shaw
- William Smart
- Florence Mary Taylor
- Jennifer Taylor
- Cynthia Teague
- Kerstin Thompson
- Yvonne von Hartel
- Emma Young

Significant firms include:

- Ashton Raggatt McDougall
- Bates Smart
- Lyons (architecture firm)
- Searle x Waldron
- Kennedy Nolan

== Notable structures ==
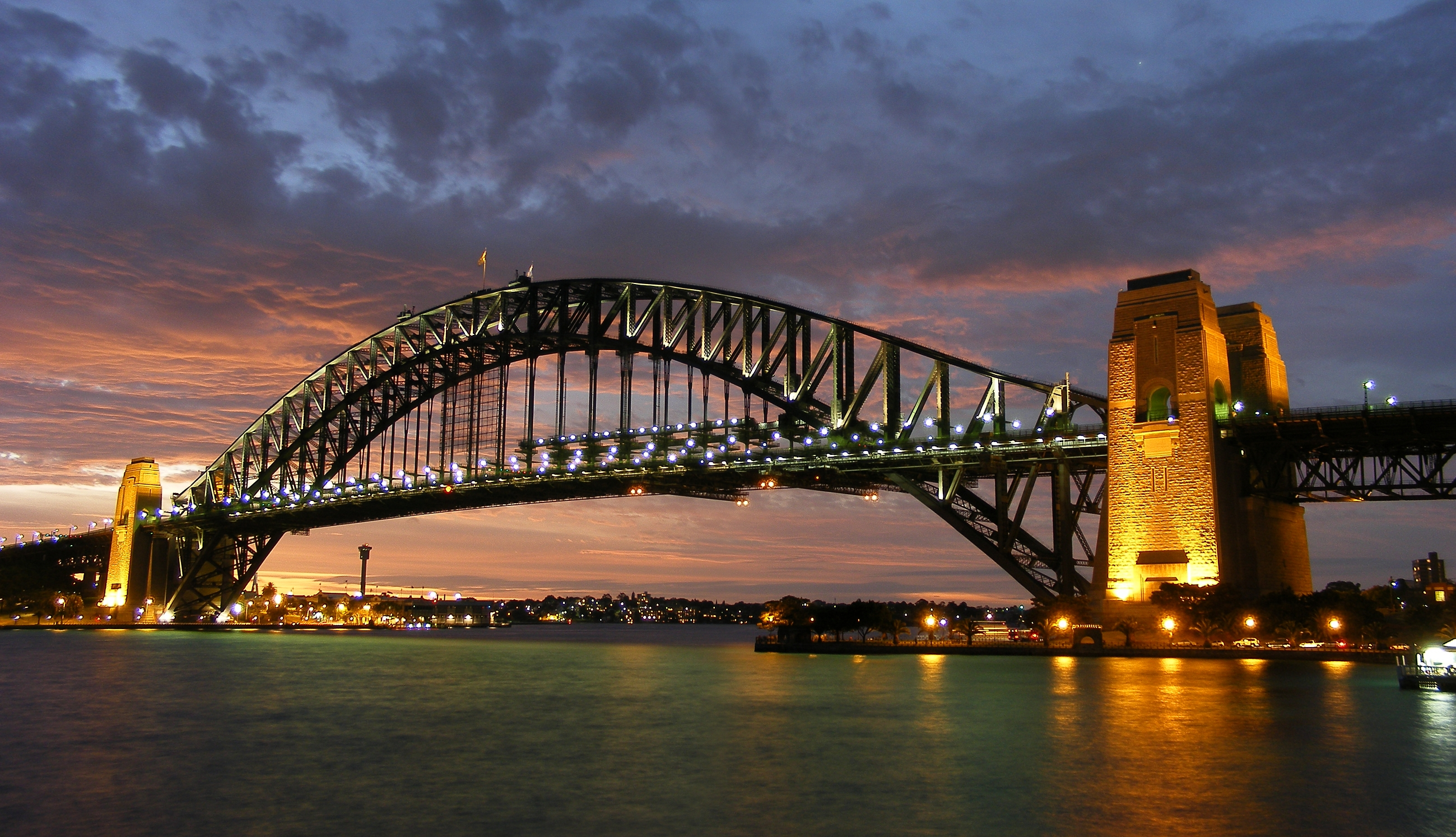
Sydney Harbour Bridge

There are many notable structures, of particular importance are:

- the Sydney Opera House, original design being by Jørn Utzon (UNESCO World Heritage)
- the Brisbane City Hall
- the Royal Exhibition Building in Melbourne (UNESCO World Heritage)
- Federation Square, Melbourne
- Parliament House, Canberra
- Sydney Harbour Bridge

== See also ==
- Urban planning in Australia
- Australasian Student Architecture Congress
