= Rosina Edmunds =

Australian architect and town planner

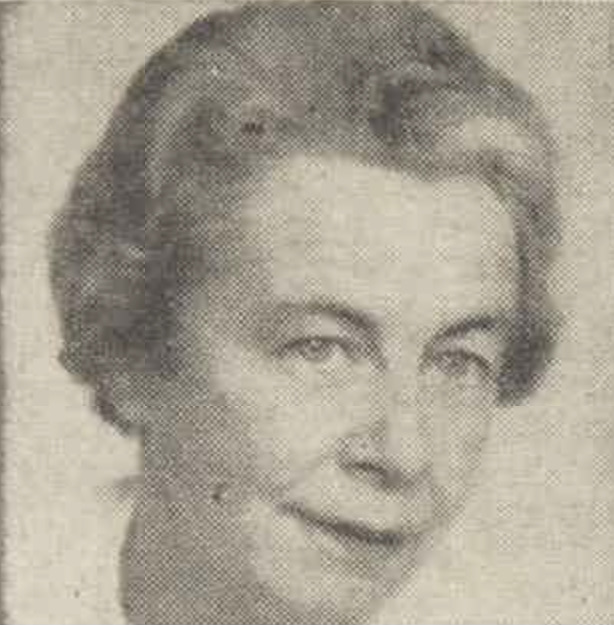
Rosina Edmunds in 1950

Rosina Mary Edmunds, also known as Rosette Edmunds (31 May 1900 – 23 April 1956), was an Australian architect, town planner and writer. Edmunds practiced in Sydney and Canberra, designing master plans and churches, and also published written works as a historian and government advocate.

== Biography ==
Edmunds was born in Sydney and completed a Bachelor of Arts degree at the University of Sydney before graduating with an architecture degree in 1924, one of the university's first women to do so. From 1929 until 1941, Edmunds worked in the Sydney office of architecture firm Clement Gancey, which had also employed other notable women architects such as Heather Sutherland, and Winsome Hall Andrew. Edmunds contributed to major master plans for Sydney.

In 1955 Edmunds began her term as President of the RAIA's Canberra Branch. She was the first woman told hold such a position in Australia.

== Works ==
- Edmunds, R. M 1938, Architecture: An Introductory Survey, Dymocks, Sydney
