= William Smart (architect) =

Australian architect

- Born: 20 June 1968; Cambridge, New Zealand
- Citizenship: Australian
- Occupation: Architect

William Smart (born 1968) is an Australian architect. He is the founding director of Smart Design Studio, an architectural practice based in Sydney.

== Early life and education ==
Smart was born in Cambridge, New Zealand, in 1968. His family relocated to Australia, eventually settling in Albany, Western Australia. He studied architecture at Curtin University of Technology in Perth, graduating with honours in 1990. At graduation, he received the RAIA WH Robertson Memorial Student Prize.

== Career ==
In 1992, Smart moved to France to work with Gersau Architecture in the Lot region. In 1992, he moved to London to work for Foster & Partners.

Smart returned to Australia in 1996 and worked with Hassell in Sydney on the Olympic Park railway station. In 1998, he established Smart Design Studio, where he is currently the Creative Director and Principal. Under his leadership, the studio has delivered a diverse portfolio of projects, including cultural institutions, commercial spaces, apartment buildings and private residences.

== Notable projects ==
Smart Design Studio has been responsible for projects including:

- Indigo Slam: A private residence in Sydney for philanthropist Judith Neilson.
- Rail Operations Centre: The main control centre for Sydney Trains.
- Stokes: The studio’s own headquarters with a caretaker’s residence above.

== Awards and recognition ==
Smart has received national and international awards, including:

- RAIA WH Robertson Memorial Student Prize in 1990
- INDE The Luminary Award in 2017
- AIA Fellowship in 2022

In his role as Creative Director, Smart Design Studio has received numerous accolades for projects, including:

- AIA National Award for Sustainable Architecture for Stokes in 2021
- AIA National Emil Soderston Award for Interior Architecture for Stokes in 2021
- Architizer A+ Low Rise (1-4 Floors) Award for Stokes in 2021
- INDE The Building Award for Stokes in 2021
- Architecture Master Prize Medium Firm of the Year in 2021
- INDE The Design Studio Award in 2021
- AIA NSW Sir Arthur G. Stephenson Award for Commercial Architecture for Stokes in 2021
- INDE The Building Award for Indigo Slam in 2017
- AIA National Robin Boyd Award for Residential Architecture for Indigo Slam in 2016
- AIA NSW Wilkinson Award for Residential Architecture for Indigo Slam in 2016
- World Architecture Festival INSIDE Award for World’s Best Residential Interior for Indigo Slam in 2016
- AIA NSW Milo Dunphy Award for Sustainability for APRA in 2009

== Literature ==
by William Smart

- Contemporary Museum Architecture and Design Theory and Practice of Place Routledge 2020, ISBN 978-0-367-07524-8 (English, 344 pages)

about William Smart

- The Local Project Habitats The Local Project 2024 ISBN 979-889443486-5 (English, 600 pages).
- MMXX Two Decades of Architecture in Australia Thames & Hudson 2020, ISBN 978-1-760-76088-5 (English, 304 pages).
- Twenty-One Australian Architects Breaking New Ground Belle 2017, ISBN 978-1742459820 (English, 320 pages).
- Materiality/ 2021 Dry Press Publishing 2021, ISBN 978-0-9944929-4-4 (English, 588 pages).
- Beautiful Australian Homes Belle Volume IV 2022 ISBN 978-1761220456 (English, 348 pages).
- Beautiful Australian Homes Belle Volume III 2021 ISBN 978-1761220456 (English, 348 pages).
- Beautiful Australian Homes Belle 2015 ISBN 978-1742457413 (English, 348 pages).
- The Apartment House Thames & Hudson 2017 ISBN 978-0-500-50104-7 (English, 272 pages).
