= Beverley Bolin =

First woman to become a registered architect in South Australia

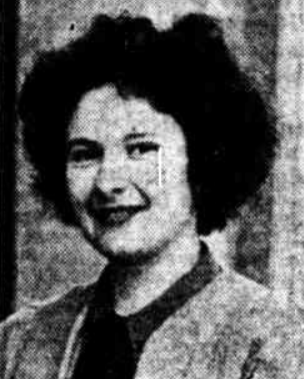
- in 1943
- Born: 23 January 1923; Sydney, New South Wales, Australia
- Died: 19 September 2014 (aged 91); Southwold, Suffolk, England
- Education: South Australian School of Mines and Industries
- Occupation: architect
- Known for: first woman to become a registered architect in South Australia

Beverley Louise Bolin (23 January 1923 – 19 September 2014) was the first woman to become a registered architect in South Australia. She graduated with a Bachelor of Engineering (Architectural) from the University of South Australia in 1949.

== Early life and education ==
Beverley Louise Bolin was born in Sydney on 23 January 1923. Ernest William Bolin and Mabel Kathleen Bolin were British immigrants and they soon moved to Brighton in South Australia. They settled in Tranmere in Emerson Grove.

Beverley completed the combined Engineering Degree in Architecture at the University of Adelaide and Fellowship Diploma of Architecture at the South Australian School of Mines and Industries (now University of South Australia). She was the first woman to become a registered architect in South Australia. While at university, Beverley was active in the Adelaide University Women’s Union as well as Wilderness School Old Scholars for her former school (McDonough 2012). She also participated into University life through club involvement being including the Adelaide University Engineering Society. Whilst she was studying she was apprenticed to Adelaide architects and she then went on to work for the South Australian Housing Trust.

== Career ==
In 1950, Bolin was working in London where she became an Associate of the Royal Institute of British Architects.

In 1988, she was working near Los Angeles where she was the President of the Women’s Architectural League. Despite this in 1998 Bolin was identified as a "Missing Golden Jubilee Graduate".

== Personal life and death ==
Bolin married Robert D. Carter in London in 1956, with whom she had one son, Christopher.

Bolin later moved to Suffolk. She died in Southwold, Suffolk on 19 September 2014, at the age of 91.

== Career ==
- Lawson and Cheeseman, 1946
- South Australian Housing Trust, 1947
- John Grey and Partner - London, 1948 - 1960
- John Grey and Partner - London, 1965 -
