= Susan Phillips (architect) =

Australian architect (born 1958)

- Born: Susan Phillips; 1958 (age 67–68)
- Occupation: Architect
- Awards: Australian Institute of Architects (SA Chapter) President's Medal

Susan Phillips is an Australian architect. In 2014 she received the Sir James Irwin President's Medal from the Australian Institute of Architects (SA).

== Background ==
Phillips trained at the University of Adelaide between 1976 and 1980. Upon graduation she worked for both Lester, Firth & Murton and Hassell, where she undertook the first extensive survey of Leigh Street in central Adelaide.

Between 1981 and 1984 she worked on the New Parliament House in Canberra, at the offices of Romaldo Giurgola, who became a key influence.

== Practice ==
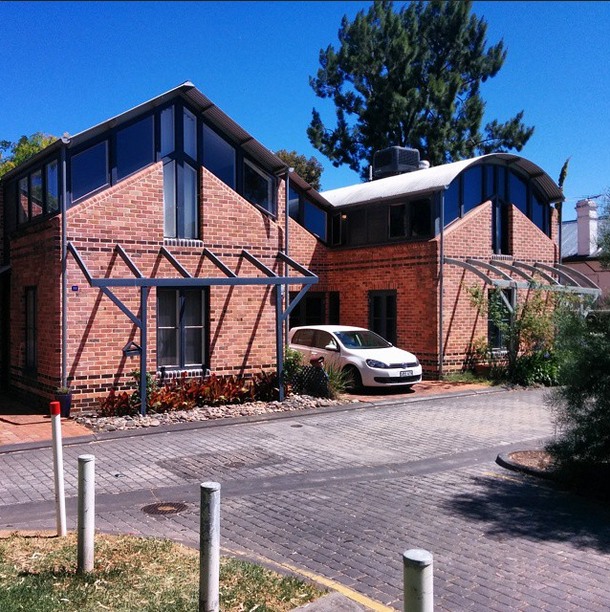
PPA kensington townhouses 1990

Phillips set up Phillips/Pilkington Architects in 1992 with Michael Pilkington, locating their office in their own house, the recently completed Kensington Townhouses.

The practice has continued to work on public and educational projects. The practice is currently located in the local heritage listed former offices of Dickson and Platten in North Adelaide.

Significant and awarded projects the practice has completed include the Port Pirie Regional Tourism and Arts Centre (the office's first major commission), the Mildura and District Education Council (2007) and the Seymour College Performing Arts Centre (2009). Key collaborations the practice have been involved in include the widely recognised Marion Cultural Centre (2001), with ARM Architecture, the University Of Adelaide Plant Accelerator, 2009 with H2o Architects and the Jeffrey Smart Building with John Wardle Architects (2014).
