= Suzanne Dance =

Suzanne Dance is a Melbourne-based architect who has spent over four decades focusing on architectural conservation and residential work in the inner suburbs of Melbourne. She has been a resident of Fitzroy since 1975 and for eight years she was secretary of the Historic Buildings Sub-Committee of Fitzroy Council's Urban Conservation Advisory Committee.

== Background ==
Susanne Dance graduated from The University of Melbourne with a Bachelor of Architecture in 1965. Upon receiving her degree, Dance was introduced to the concept of Urbanism, and realised that the buildings surrounding the city of Melbourne encouraged the idea of a "rich communal life", an ideal supported by many leading urban architects. At the time, these nineteenth century buildings were inexpensive and required renovation, thus her first projects as a sole practitioner were from clients owning these particular houses and requesting alterations and additions.

Dance's fascination with the built urban fabric of Melbourne eventually "led to work in conservation for various community groups and led [her] to undertake a post graduate course in Architectural conservation in Rome" in 1981. Whilst completing her postgraduate course, she identified Rome as a "benchmark for a successful city" for its utilisation of space and common outdoor areas, while still incorporating occasional architectural outbursts.

Dance then applied the same concept to Melbourne stating that by 2030 buildings in the inner city should share boundary walls, small courtyards, eliminate lifts and share solar power and the ability to cross ventilate. These changes may provide similar population density to high-rise towers, without the environmental drawbacks.

== Notable projects ==
=== Boyd/Caswell House ===
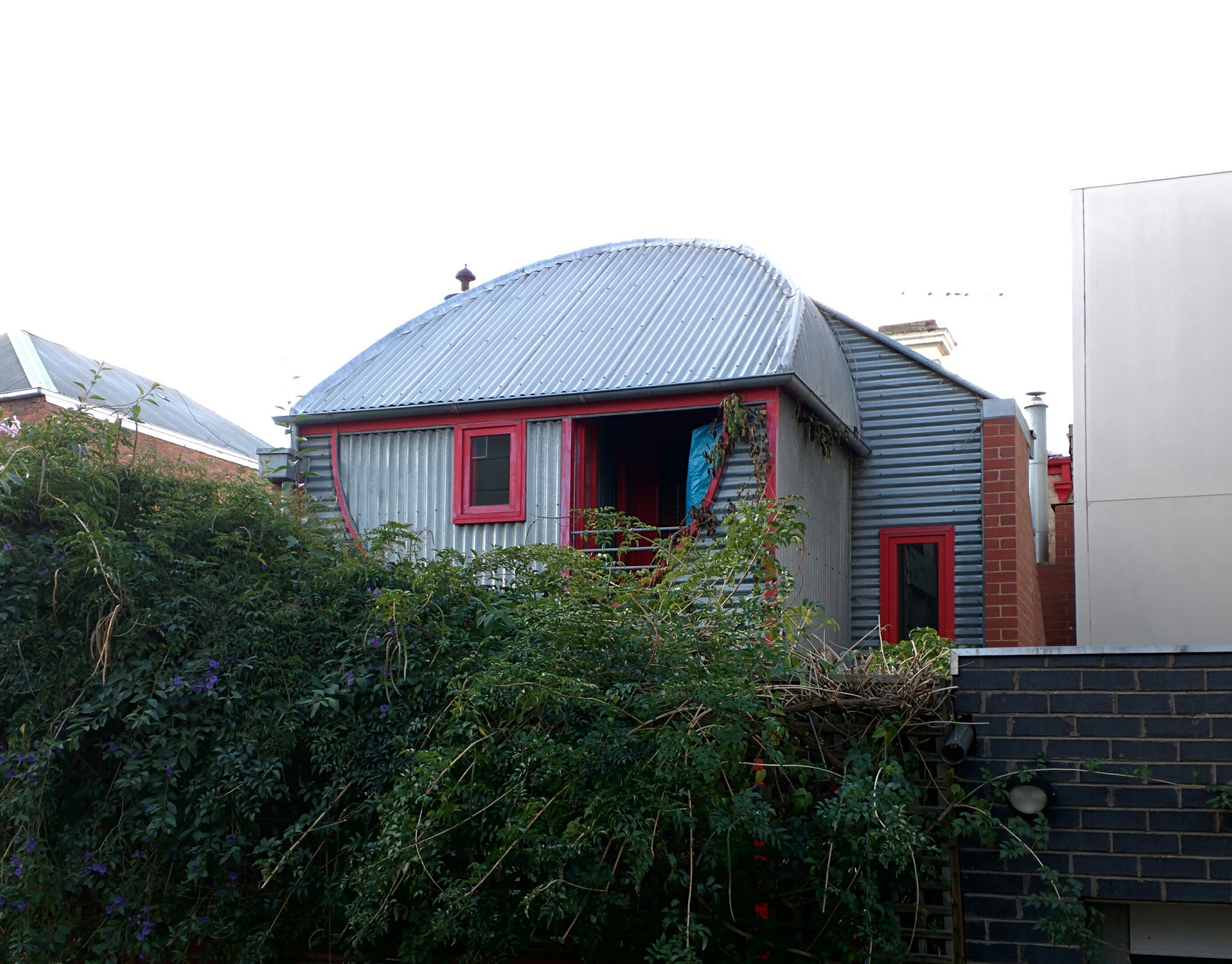
Boyd/Caswell House from the back alley

Originally built in the early 19th century, located on outskirts of the city (Carlton), this terrace house remained untouched until the addition designed by Dance in 1994. The clients requested that the addition to the house create two separate living zones; one for the couple of the household and another for their teenage daughter. Dance achieved this by retaining the first two rooms of the terrace, making them the daughter's bedroom and study, thus Dance could design a new section of the house solely dedicated to the use of the parents. The new wing incorporated a bedroom, study, ensuite and kitchenette. To ensure a clear division, Dance created a second staircase joining the kitchen on the first floor to the parental zone on the second, therefore the two zones did not connect through a shared staircase.

For Dance the renovation did not only separate the two zones through program but also though the high contrast in design. The extension was made with corrugated steel to contrast the original brick building. The added curved roofline added a sense of space, with the roof reaching 3.5 meters at its highest point. A deck was added between the two zones acting as a communal space and a light well, sending shafts of light through the irregularly shaped windows outlined in bright red. It has been suggested that sometimes extensions should amplify the differences to enhance the original.

=== Conservatory Home ===
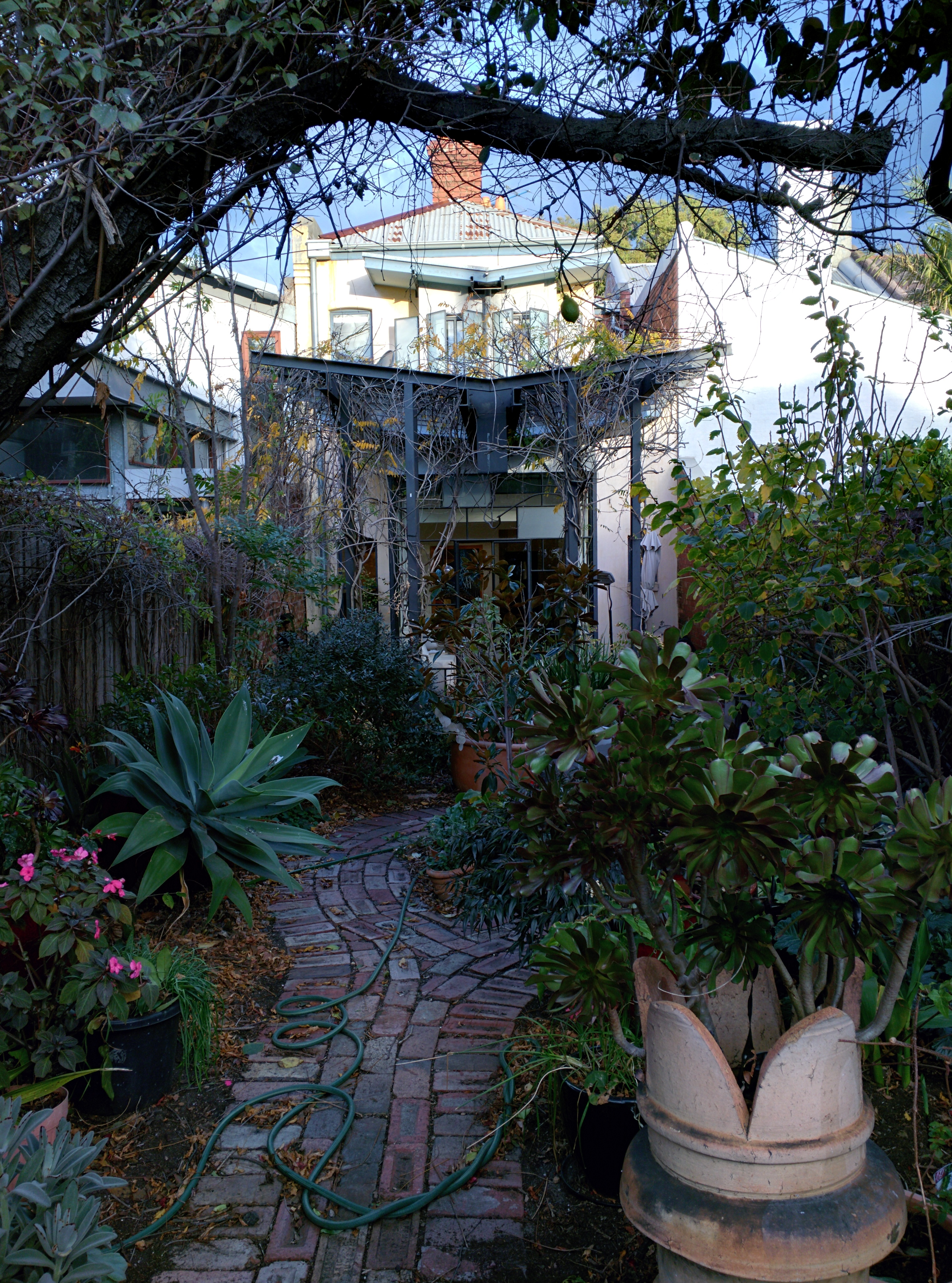
Conservatory Home Pergola & Conservatory

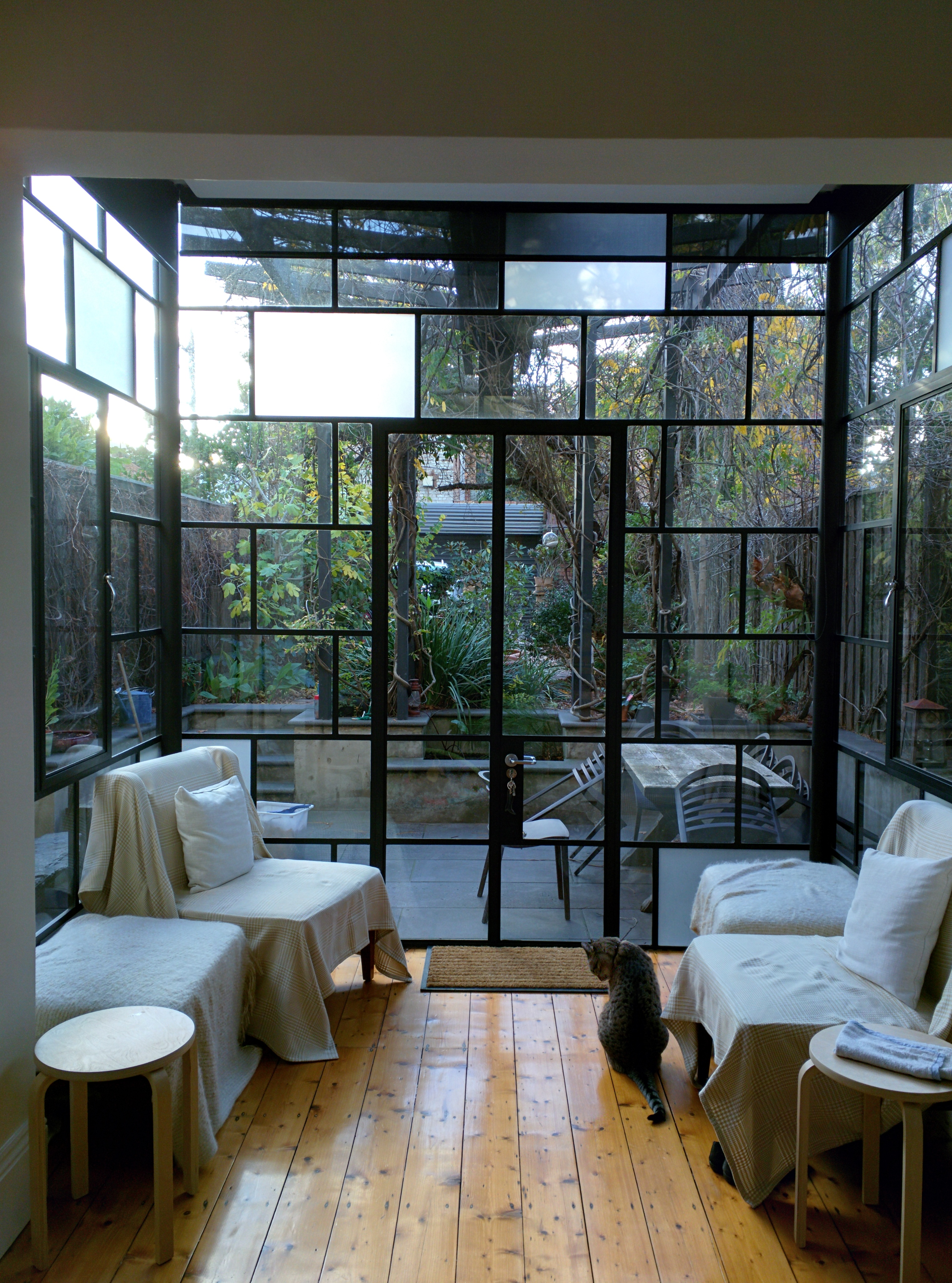
An interior view of Conservatory Home

This house began as an 1870s Victorian terrace house, which was left boarded-up and uninhabitable for 15 years before Dance renovated it and made new additions. Like many Victorian style terraces, this house had a well-planned façade with large windows. However the rear looked like an afterthought and a series of makeshift rooms that may have been added at a later date. This resulted in a house that was poorly lit and very dark towards the back of the terrace. Dance approached this project aiming to leave as much of the existing structure as she could, thus leading to her building a conservatory that protruded form the outside of the building. The conservatory consisted of floor to ceiling glass windows underneath a new pergola. The glass structure allowed light into the original parts of the house such as the kitchen and living areas. A similar aesthetic was also applied to the upper floor at a smaller scale to allow light into the bedroom.

=== Actor's House and Studio ===
The Actor’s house and studio was designed by Suzanne Dance in Melbourne, 1976. It was awarded the RAIA Victorian Chapter, Housing Category Medal. Corrugated iron was used as a primary material for this structure as it was used internationally and locally for its flexible and malleable properties, which then helped Dance achieve a primitive and a strange futuristic image. The building was wrapped using this material to clad both the inside and outside of the back half of the house. This helped to elongate the form of the building, which was placed on an already very tight and vertical site. Corrugated iron is nestled behind a wall of trees making the house blend into the environment. The materials that dance chose to use for this project highly influenced the form of the building, which further influenced how corrugated iron is used in the suburbs of Melbourne.

== List of projects ==
- Boyd/Caswell House, Carlton (1994)
- Caswell Koletsis House, Fitzroy (1990)
- Napier Street Residence, Fitzroy (1991)
- Actor's House and Studio (1976)
- Residence, Ivanhoe (2007)
- A Garden Room, Brunswick (2000)
- Conservatory Home, West Melbourne (1870)
- Fitzroy Housing Repair Service

== Awards ==
- 1979: RAIA Victorian Chapter Urbanand Community Design Award Medal, for her participation in the Fitzroy Housing Repair Service References
- 1980: RAIA Victorian Chapter housing Category, Medal for 'Actors studio' North Melbourne
