= Kristin Green =

Australian architect

Kristin Green is an architect and the founding and creative director of Australian-based architectural firm Kristin Green Associates architecture (KGA architecture, KGA official website). Established in Melbourne in 2009, KGA architecture has gained critical attention and several awards for projects completed in inner Melbourne as well as in country Victoria and the Asia Pacific.

Notable projects include: the Spring Street Grocer — a coffee bar, gelateria and fine food grocer with a cheese room and event space in Melbourne’s CBD; La Plage du Pacifique — an as-yet unfinished resort in Vanuatu; and Three Springs Residence and Art Gallery — architecture as 'gesamkunstwerk' combining a residence and private art gallery sitting amidst a KGA-designed landscape. Later commissions by the client have resulted in KGA designing and building an Art-Storage Bunker/Carport and a Wine Cellar in separate locations on their 85-acre property in Victoria's Dandenong Ranges.

== Early life and education ==
On finishing high school in Melbourne, Australia, where she was born, Green worked as a builders’ labourer, house painter and landscaping assistant across Australia and later in the US. These hands-on experiences inspired her to study architecture, both personally – seeking examples of historical and contemporary architecture across the USA, Europe and Australia – and academically. In 2004 she graduated with honours from RMIT University Architecture, a course renowned for its focus on innovative design practice, project-based research and critical debate. Green continues these practises through KGA as well through the studios and 'crits' she runs with architecture and design students at both RMIT University and the University of Melbourne.

Green’s contributions to architectural practice across Australia and the Pacific are extended via professional and non-academic engagements such as:

- Professional member (Architect), Australian Institute of Architects (AIA)
- Juror, 2014 AIA Interior Architecture Awards
- Invited speaker, 2015 National Architecture Conference: RISK, Melbourne Convention and Exhibition Centre, 14-16 May 2015
- Invited speaker, 2017 Practice Matters: Women in Practice Lecture Series, Newcastle University School of Architecture & Built Environment

== Career ==
After graduating in 2004, Green worked for Melbourne architecture firms Hassell, BKK Architects, Peter Mills, Nic Boschler and at landscape architecture practice Taylor Cullity Lethlean, where she was on the project team of the multi-award-winning Craigieburn Bypass project.

Since setting up her own practice in 2009, KGA architecture has completed a variety of projects, winning awards and gaining critical attention from other architecture. In 2014, her project La Plage du Pacifique was included in MORPHOS – Sustainable Empires, an exhibition held at Venice's Palazzo Albrizzi during the 2014 Venice Architecture Biennale: Fundamentals, directed by Rem Koolhaas.

In 2015, La Plage du Pacifique was pictured on the cover of a book, Practical Poetics in Architecture, by the Royal Melbourne Institute of Technology's Innovation Professor of Architecture, Leon Van Schaik.

== Notable works ==
- La Plage du Pacifique, Vanuatu.
- Spring Street Grocer, Melbourne, Australia.
- Three Springs Residence and Art Gallery, Dandenong Ranges, Victoria.
- Three Springs Art-Storage Bunker, Dandenong Ranges, Victoria.

== Awards ==
Year	Organising Body	Award Category	Project Name	Project Location
2013	Australian Institute of Architects	Commercial Architecture Award: Commendation	Spring Street Grocer	Melbourne
2013	Architecture Media	Eat Drink Design Award – Best Retail Design: Winner	Spring Street Grocer	Melbourne
2015	Australian Tapestry Workshop	Tapestry Design Prize for Architects (TDPA): Joint First Prize (with John Wardle Architects)	Long Term Parking	South Melbourne
2023	Australian Institute of Architects – Victorian Chapter	Interior Architecture Regional Prize: Winner	Three Springs Residence and Art Gallery	Dandenong Ranges, Victoria
2023	Australian Institute of Architects – Victorian Chapter	COLORBOND® Award for Steel Architecture Regional Award: Winner	Three Springs Residence and Art Gallery	Dandenong Ranges, Victoria
2023	Australian Institute of Architects – National	National Award for Interior Architecture: Shortlisted	Three Springs Residence and Art Gallery	Dandenong Ranges, Victoria
2023	World Architecture Festival 2023	Inside World Festival of Interiors: Shortlisted	Three Springs Residence and Art Gallery	Dandenong Ranges, Victoria
2023	Australian Institute of Architects – Victorian Chapter	Regional Prize – Small Project Architecture: Winner	Three Springs Art-Storage Bunker	Dandenong Ranges, Victoria
2023	World Architecture Festival 2023	Shortlisted	Three Springs Residence and Art Gallery	Dandenong Ranges, Victoria
