= Cassandra Fahey =

Australian architect

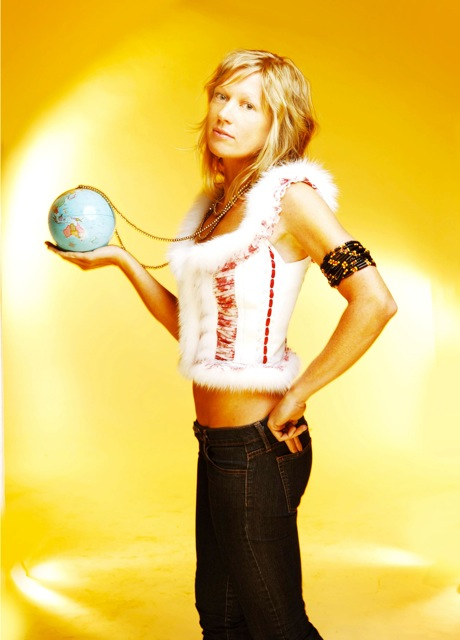
Cassandra Fahey

Cassandra Fahey (born c. 1972) is an Australian architect and interior designer residing in Melbourne. She is Director of the architecture firm "Cassandra Complex". She emerged in the public spotlight in 2000 because of the controversial 'Newman House', located in St Kilda, designed for media and football identity Sam Newman. She is also known for her works on "The Smith Great Aussie Home" and the BHP Billiton Healesville Sanctuary "Platypusary". Her work has received a number of awards as well as being featured in many local and international publications.

== Career ==
Cassandra completed the Bachelor of Architecture at Royal Melbourne Institute of Technology (RMIT) in 1998. During her studies she traveled internationally to produce a documentary on Architects practicing at the turn of the millennium. Among these were Sir Norman Foster, Peter Eisenman, and Jean Nouvel. Whilst in New York she met Richard Serra and was influenced by his sculpture in its original setting in a converted New York City garage. The effect of this can be seen later in the design of her own house, "Chameleon".

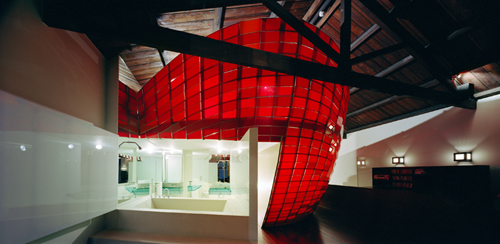
Interior of Chameleon, 2001.

Back in Melbourne, in her earlier career she received guidance from Tom Kovac and Edmond Corrigan and soon registered her own practice which she named the Cassandra Complex. In 2005 Fahey was engaged in a Masters in Contemporary Art at the Victorian College of the Arts in Melbourne.

Fahey developed a unique approach to architecture using different styles in each of her projects rather than developing a common theme. Her influences within this "no one way" approach have been "so-called nature", Emily Kame Kngwarreye and the "whole bang lot".

== Notable works ==
=== Sam Newman House ===
Fahey was given a completely open brief for the Sam Newman House—named White Noise after Robert Venturis Term 'Billboard Façade'—in St. Kilda West, Melbourne. It features Cassandra's 9 m by 8 m façade design comprising patterned glass and contains a Pamela Anderson mural, with a garage door opening at her mouth. Post-modernism co-habits seamlessly with minimalism.

It was completed in 2001 and its mural received the Best New Residential Building in the RAIA Victorian Architecture Awards. The design of the house's exterior was controversial however, encountering objections and incorrect planning applications. It became known as the house that Melburnians love to hate.

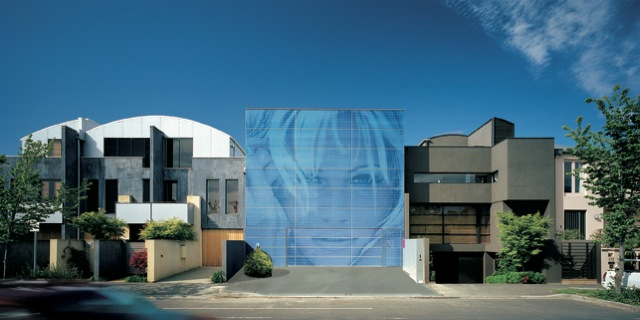
"White Noise", Newman House

=== BHP Billiton Platypusary ===
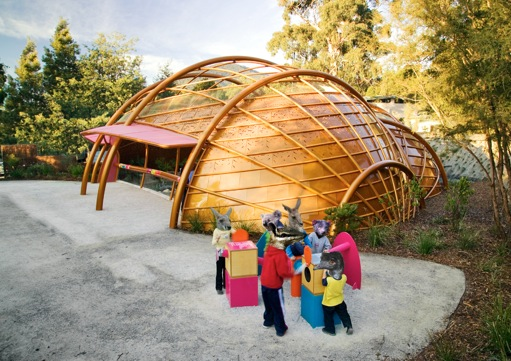
BHP Billiton Platypussary at Healesville Sanctuary.

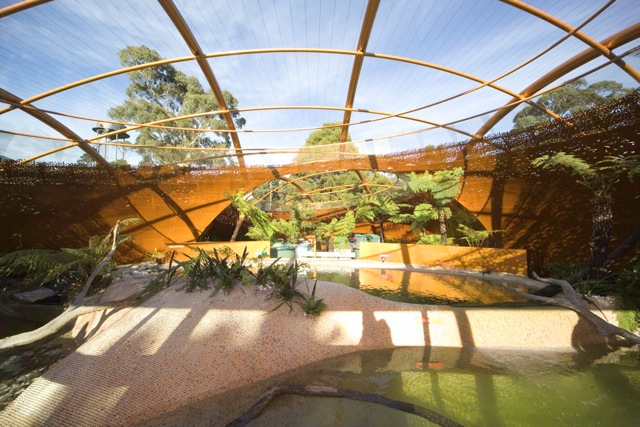
BHP Billiton Platypussary at Healesville Sanctuary.

Platypusary at Healsville sanctuary (also known as BHP Billiton Platypusary) was opened to the public on 12 May 2005. Its façade comprises gold panels with inscribed leaf shapes and encloses a ponds of water running like a native creek. The passing of sun over these leaves casts complex shadows and reflections onto the marble ground of the platypusary.

The movement of the water through the pools provides different refractions cast upon the gold panels, reiterating the constant connection and reflection. Awelye represents ceremony in aboriginal culture of Australia.

=== Smith Great Aussie Home ===
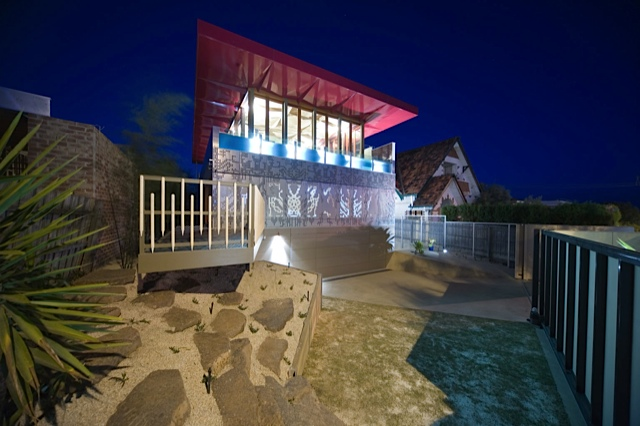
Smith Great Aussie Home – Black Rock

The Smith Great Aussie Home was designed for the self-made businessman Darren Smith. The $1.6 million "trophy home" is located at Black Rock, Melbourne, Victoria.

=== New Gold Mountain Bar ===
Designed by Fahey in 2003, New Gold Mountain is a bar located in Melbourne's CBD. Fahey's concept surrounds an old tailors studio on the outskirts of the city's Chinatown district with a space replicating the unique theme of an opium den. Distorted images of opium smokers form repeated patterns, wallpapering the walls and soft furnishings. Upstairs tantric red wallpaper and sectioned caverns create a strong mood for conversation and company. There are glistening beads, pink opium moments and multi coloured skirts hanging from the ceiling.

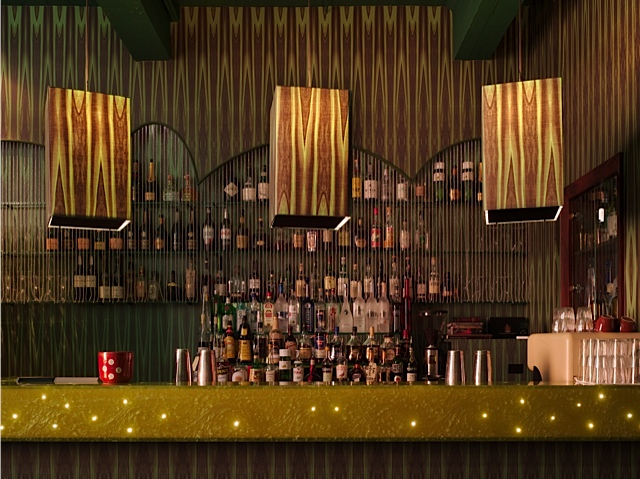
New Gold Mountain, Melbourne, Australia in 2003

=== Other notable works ===
Husk Boutique, Melbourne, CBD
Crowning Glory, Monash Museum of Art
Chameleon warehouse conversion, North Melbourne
Josh Abrahams House, Brighton
A bathroom for Jonathan Mills
Oral & Maxillofacial Surgery, Russell Street, Melbourne
Breamlea House
Menorah House, Hawthorn (unbuilt)

== Awards ==
- 2007 Bulletin Smart 100 – Best Australian Designer 2007
- 2007 Marion Mahony Interior Architecture Award – New Gold Mountain, Melbourne
- 2007 Residential Architecture – Houses Award – The Smith Great Aussie Home, Blackrock
- 2007 Interior Commendation – National Award – The Smith Great Aussie Home, Blackrock
- 2006 Institutional Architecture Award – BHP Billiton Platypussary, Victoria
- 2006 Commercial Architecture Award – HUSK Collins Street, Melbourne
- 2006 Dulux Color Awards – Chameleon (Warehouse conversion), North Melbourne
- 2004 Residential Architecture Award – Chameleon, North Melbourne
- 2004 The Interior Award – National Award – Chameleon, North Melbourne
- 2004 IDA Interior Design Awards – Chameleon, Refurbished Residential Interior
- 2003 Residential Architecture Award – Sam Newman House, St. Kilda
