= Eileen Good =

Australian architect and educator

- Born: Eileen Mary Florence Good; 1893
- Died: 1986 (aged 92–93)
- Occupation: Architect

Eileen Mary Florence Good (1893–1986) was an Australian architect and educator. She was Australia's first female architectural academic and the University of Melbourne’s first female graduate of architecture.

== Biography ==
Eileen Good began her career in architecture in 1912 when she was articled to the Melbourne architecture firm Purchas and Teague after leaving school. Good became the third woman to enrol in the University of Melbourne’s Diploma of Architecture, and in 1920 she completed her studies as the course’s first female graduate. In 1920 she was employed by architect F. Louis Klingender. In the same year she became the first female member of the Royal Victorian Institute of Architects.

In 1924 Good was employed by the University of Melbourne, making her the university’s architecture department’s first full-time staff member, and the first female Australian architectural academic. She was original appointed to the position of teacher, "demonstrator", and developer of the University's architectural library. These roles were later expanded to include teaching in the engineering facility. Eileen Good was appointed to the position of lecturer in 1946 and she continued to work at the University of Melbourne until her retirement in 1962.

== Awards and acknowledgements ==
In 2004 the Australian Capital Territory government acknowledged Eileen Good's life and work by naming a street in the Canberra suburb of Greenway, Eileen Good Street, after her.
