= Winsome Hall Andrew =

Australian architect

- Born: Winsome Alice Hall; 1905; Woollahra, New South Wales
- Died: 1997 (aged 91–92)
- Education: University of Sydney
- Occupation: Architect

Winsome Alice Hall Andrew (née Hall; 1905–1997) was an Australian architect.

== Background and career ==
Andrew was born in Woollahra, New South Wales in 1905. She was the fifth child born of ten to Arthur Hall and Susy Foy. Being raised in a middle-class family, Andrew and her siblings had a tough upbringing due to their mother coming from a wealthy family and their father working for the New South Wales public service as a surveyor on a clerical wage. Arthur Hall had a strict eye for perfection and only expected the highest of standards from his sons and daughters. Winsome attended Sydney Girls High School where she was an outstanding student both academically and athletically. This ensured her a scholarship to study architecture at the University of Sydney from 1922 to graduate in 1928, where she was the sole woman in her year and the only woman graduate to proceed to find employment.

== Partial list of works ==
The following buildings designed either in part or in full by Andrew:

Buildings designed either in part or in full by Winsome Hall Andrew
| Building name | Image | Location | Years built | Heritage register(s) | Notes |
|---|---|---|---|---|---|
| St. Ignatius Church | | Taralga, New South Wales | 1933 | | Blueprints drafted by Andrew under the name of Clement Glancey |
| Stockleigh Hall | | Regent's Park Estate, Camden Borough, London | 1934 | | Acted as a senior assistant in the office of Robert Atkinson |
| Police Section House residential block | | Scotland Yard, London | 1936 | | Acted as job captain at Stanley Livrock’s office |
| Manly Surf Life Saving Pavilion | | Manly, New South Wales | 1939 | | Partnered with Eric W. Andrew; demolished in 1980 |
| Embassy of the United States | | Canberra, Australian Capital Territory | 1939 | | Drafted by Andrew under Malcolm Mior and Heather Sutherland |
| Proposed student hostel and lecture room | | Canberra, Australian Capital Territory | 1939 | | Drafted by Andrew under Malcolm Mior and Heather Sutherland, never built |
| Anzac House | | Sydney, New South Wales | 1948 | | Project architect for Eric W. Andrew competition entry, never built |
| Alterations to Edgworth School | | Vaucluse, New South Wales | 1948 | | Andrew added a glass room, a flat and verandah |
| Ryde housing scheme | | Ryde, New South Wales | Late 1950s | | Designed by Andrew in conjunction with Spencer John Raymond |
| Australian Institute of Builders Headquarters | | Canberra, Australian Capital Territory | 1956 | | Partnered with Eric W. Andrew |

== Awards ==
- 1934 RIBA competitions Medal, Stockleigh Hall at Regent Park
- 1936 RIBA competitions Medal, Police Section House residential block
- 1939 Sulman Award (winner), Manly Surf Pavilion
- 1948 Anzac House Competition (second place), Anzac House
