= Douglas Snelling =

Australian architect and designer (1916–1985)

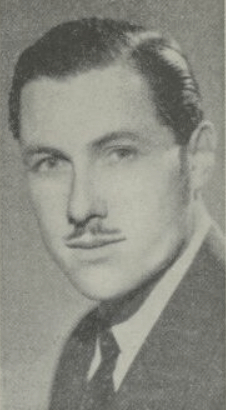
Douglas Snelling c.1948

Douglas Burrage Snelling (1916–1985) was an Australian architect and designer.

== Early life ==
He was born on 24 February 1916, the only child of a bootmaker, Albert Edward Snelling, and his wife Ethel May, née Burrage, in Gravesend, Kent, England. He arrived in Wellington, New Zealand, with his parents in 1926.

As a teenager, he began his own graphic arts and shop window design business in Wanganui. In 1937, he travelled to Hollywood, where he freelanced making sketches, and began to emulate Errol Flynn's style.

He returned to New Zealand, in 1938, and became a writer, broadcaster and publicist of new movies and stars, until 1940.

He moved to Sydney in 1940 and worked as a publicist and in a munitions factory during the beginning of World War II.

== Product designer (1945—1948) ==
In 1945, he married New Zealand heiress Nancy Bear née Springhall. With her money, he opened a business designing shop windows and furniture. His chairs featured parachute webbing and functional modernist designs, and according to the Powerhouse Museum, were "Australia's first popular, mass produced range of furniture sold widely through the major department stores from the late 1940s to the mid 1950s." The now iconic chairs, branded with other designs as the "Snelling Line", went on sale, in 1946, from the department store Anthony Hordens. Snelling became a partner in a company, Functional Products Pty. Ltd, that made furniture in a factory at St Peters, from 1947 to 1955. For Australia at the time, the chair designs were revolutionary. In reality, they were near copies, made from Australian hardwood, that were adapted from the '600 series' wartime-production designs that Danish-American designer, Jens Risom (1916–2016) had made for his business partner, Hans Knoll, in 1941. Snelling also did work for a consumer electronics manufacturer, Kriesler, including on the design of the bakelite case of their iconic 'Sealed Midget' (Model 11-4) radio, also known as the 'Beehive', made from 1946 to 1948.

Both the furniture range and radio were radical departures from staid and conventional pre-war designs; both sold in large numbers in Australia, during the consumption boom after the end of wartime austerity measures. Examples of his furniture are included in the collections of the National Gallery of Victoria and the Museum of Applied Arts and Sciences. There remains a thriving market for his webbing chairs, which are also on occasion replicated by craft furniture makers, and the 'Beehive' radio remains of interest to collectors of bakelite radios.

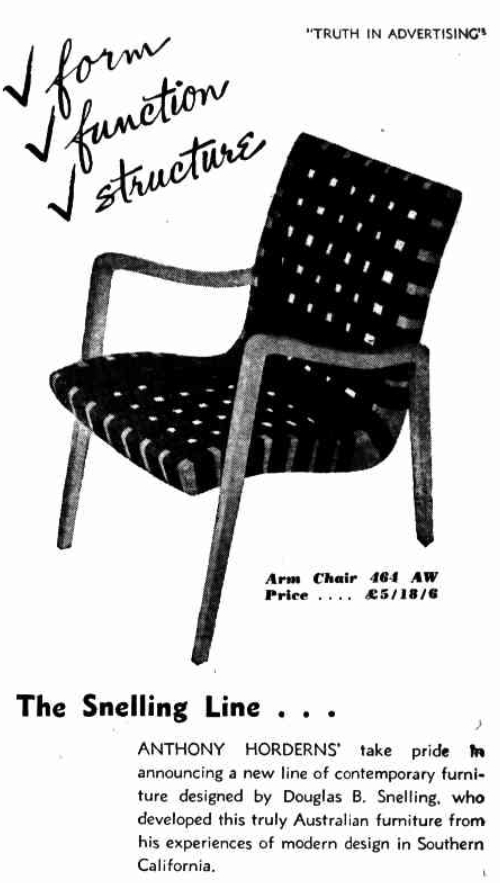
An Anthony Horderns advertisement for 'Snelling Line' furniture (1946)

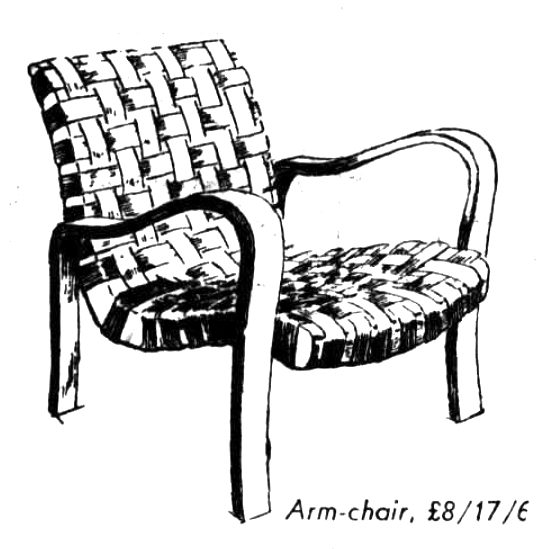
'Snelling Line' armchair (Farmer and Company advertisement, 1950)

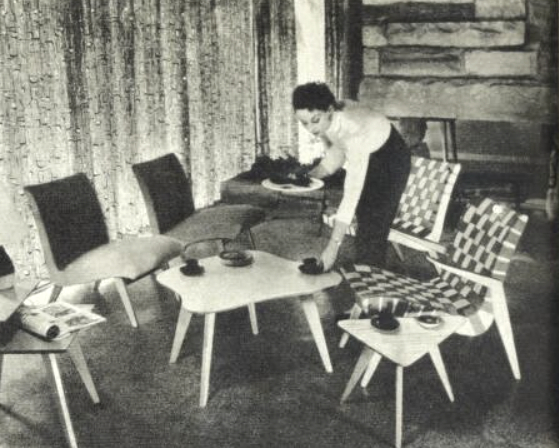
'Snelling Line' furniture (Functional Products advertisement, 1954)

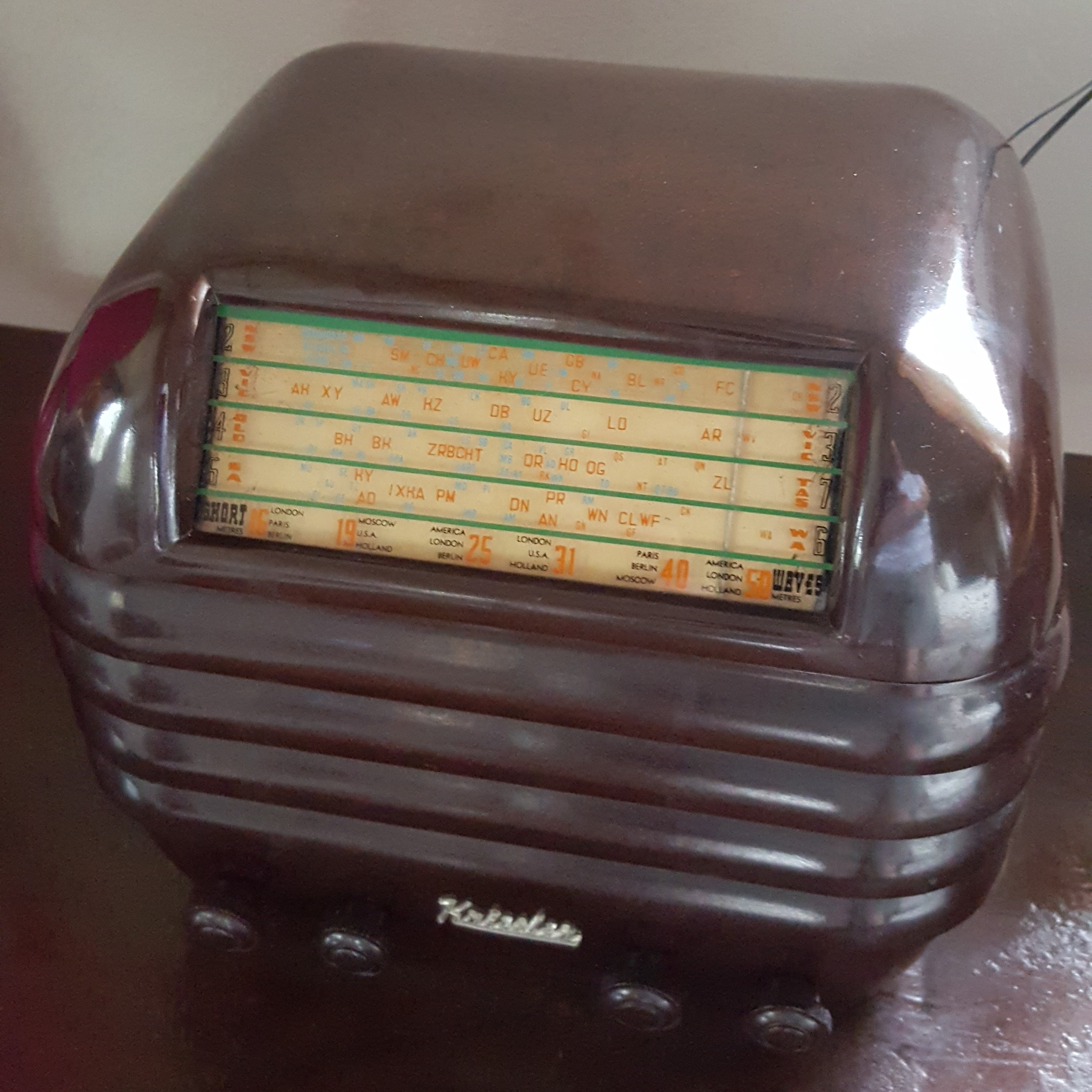
Kriesler radio receiver (Model 11-4), colloquially known as a 'Beehive'

== Architect (1948—1975) ==
Snelling and his wife travelled to America, in 1947. His earlier work in shop interior design won him a job with the practice of Beverly Hills architects Douglas Honnold and John Lautner. While in America, he was inspired by Frank Lloyd Wright's work. From 1933 to 1939, his employer John Lautner had worked and studied under Wright, at the studios in Wisconsin and Arizona. Snelling would also be influenced by other California-based American architects who were associated with Wright's design tradition, notably, Gordon Drake, Harwell Hamilton Harris, and Richard Neutra.

When they returned to Australia in 1948, Snelling met architect, Harry Seidler, and began designing houses. However, his very first competed building was the factory building in which his furniture was made, at St Peters. Otherwise, he seems to have begun his practice, Douglass B. Snelling & Associates, in 1948, drawing upon his previous experience and redesigning shop interiors and displays, including the Children's Department of the Sydney Snow department store and two other city shops. His first significant house design, in 1949, was the modernist house that Snelling designed as his own home but sold before moving in, Perpetua, in Northbridge; many years later and after becoming run down, the house was redesigned by Alexander Tzannes, and it won that architect the Wilkinson Award and Robin Boyd Award for 1997. Snelling became a registered architect in 1952. He designed modernist houses, apartment buildings, and office buildings.

Snelling emerged as an architect for the wealthy and socially-prominent in Sydney. One of his designs, the Kelly house at Bellevue Hill, won the House of the Year Award, from the Melbourne-based Architecture and Arts magazine, for houses constructed during 1955. His notable 1950s designs were for extremely large houses—the Kelly house had 60 squares or 557 square metres of floor area—that included staff quarters, built in fashionable Sydney suburbs. This was in marked contrast to the functional, European-influenced small house designs being produced around the same time, by Harry Seidler.

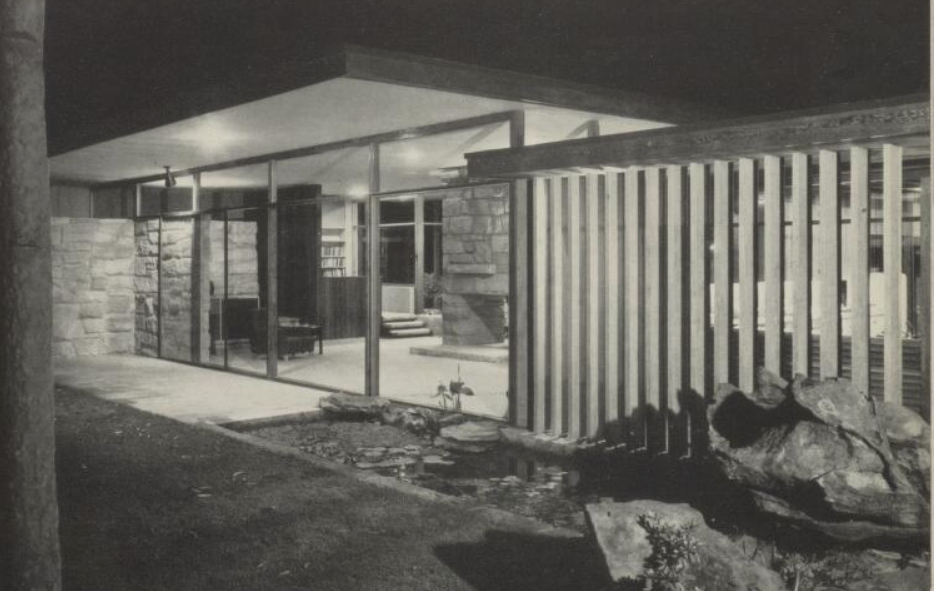
'Four-courters house', St Ives, NSW (1954)

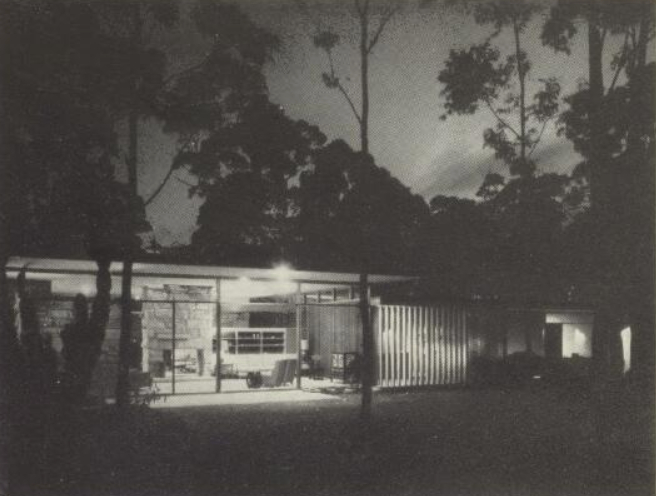
'Four-courters house', St Ives, NSW (1954)

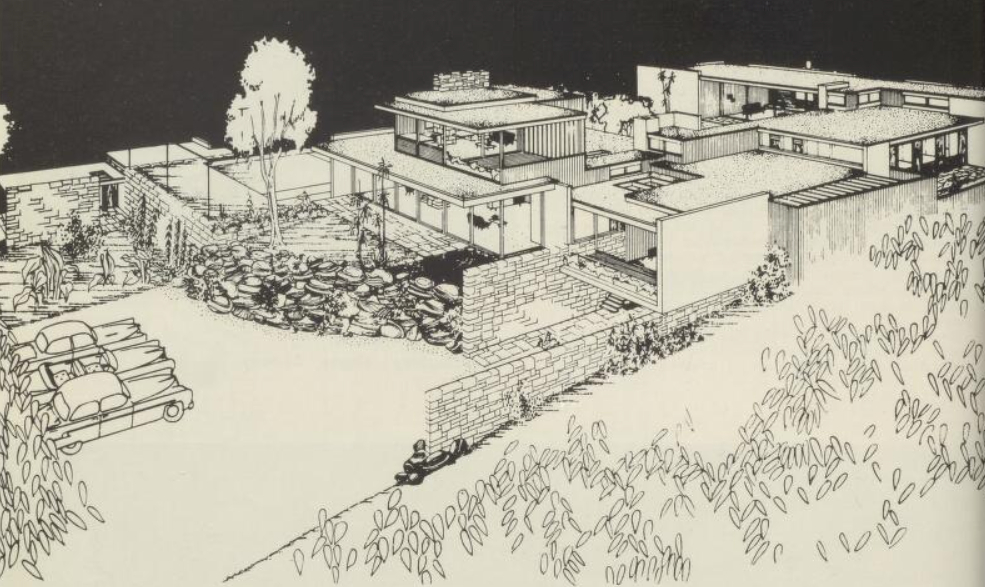
'Kelly house' (the first one, completed in 1955), Bellevue Hill, NSW

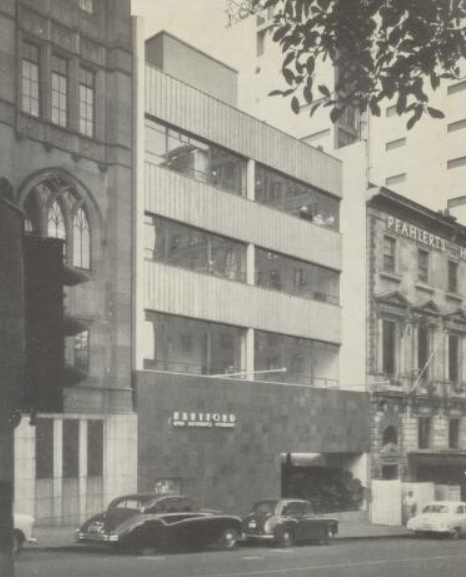
Hartford Insurance building (c.1954), simple in external appearance, but it was a renovation with some difficult technical challenges for Snelling.

He and his wife divorced in 1959, and the next year he married Patricia Anne Youdale, née Gale (a Sydney socialite and daughter of a wealthy Sydney property developer and grazier), with whom he raised three sons and her daughter by a previous marriage.

From the mid-1950s to the mid-1970s, other Australian architects and designers often favored Scandinavian modernism, British "new brutalism", or the Australian regional modernism of the Sydney School, also known as the 'nuts and berries style'. The style of Snelling's earlier house designs was probably closest to, or a forerunner of, the Sydney School in approach. This phase of his work was heavily influenced by Wright, and culminated in the first Kelly House at Bellevue Hill, built in 1955.

The second phase of his architecture was Scandinavian-influenced, with functional designs featuring pale brick. These included two notable early 1960s apartment blocks, Bibaringa—set in a 0.75 acre garden—on New South Head Road, at Double Bay, and a block of bachelor flats, on Roslyn Gardens, Elizabeth Bay. Both had rock gardens and ponds well-stocked with koi carp, at their entrances, something of a Snelling trademark feature.

Later, he preferred California-Polynesian tropical paradise themed designs; these were also known as 'tiki style' and can be considered a part of the wider post-war societal fascination with Polynesian-inspired 'tiki culture' themes. This style was used in two of his designs that were built in Sydney, at Clareville in 1965 and Vaucluse in 1967. The house at Vaucluse—the second 'Kelly house', called Tahiti—had an 'infinity pool', the first such swimming pool in Australia and probably only the second in the world.

Snelling's work became the forerunner of the pseudo-thatched roof designs of the 'indigenous modern' movement. Although derided or overlooked by many of his younger contemporaries, both before and after Snelling's death, the 'indigenous modern' style became a preferred style for luxury resorts as well as residences in Asia-Pacific, from the 1970s until the 1990s.

In the mid-1960s Snelling and his wife travelled to Cambodia, which started a long interest in that country that led him to a friendship with Prince Sihanouk, an appointment as an honorary consul-general of Cambodia (1970–75), and a hobby of collecting and trading Khmer antiquities. He wrote on the subject of Kymer sculpture and on the temples of Angkor Wat.

It seemed as if his and Patricia's was a glamorous, near ideal lifestyle, but that was not the reality. Snelling's stepdaughter recalled that, from around the time of their first son's birth, in 1963, Patricia had become progressively more unhappy and ill, that the pair generally started drinking, at 5 p.m. each day, and that, due to Snelling's controlling behaviour, her mother seemed to have no life of her own. She recalled that Snelling sought to control who was in Patricia's circle of friends and prevailed upon her to be on the socially-prominent Black and White Committee, to maintain their social standing and presumably also Snelling's connection to wealthy potential clients.

A member since 1953, he became a fellow of the Royal Australian Institute of Architects, in 1967.

In the early 1970s, he built a pair of houses in Nouméa. Among his final designs were waterfront property schemes for Fiji and Vanuatu, featuring modernist thatched hut-like buildings. These were never built, and the end of these commercial developments in the Pacific resulted in Snelling closing his offices, after 1972.

He is conspicuously absent in some key historical articles on Australian modernism, and is now better known for his chairs than his buildings, but his work is said to have influenced younger Australian architects, such as Peter Stutchbury and Richard Leplastrier. Some of his later architectural designs, dating from 1965 to 1972, are held in the collection of the State Library of New South Wales. In 2021, ten of his buildings were included in the Australian Institute of Architects' list of significant buildings in New South Wales.

== Later life and death ==
Although only in his fifties, he was finding it harder to find interesting commissions, by the early 1970s, while many of his contemporaries, such as Harry Seidler, still had flourishing and productive careers. The Sydney City Council had removed the 150-foot height limit in 1958, and two of Snelling's low-rise office buildings in Sydney were subsequently demolished for redevelopment.

Snelling continued to drink heavily, something that complicated his already cantankerous, querulous, and quarrelsome nature, and brought about violent and irrational mood swings. There were unseemly public outbursts, such as his pompously toned letter of April 1974, critical of the awarding of a prize to Jørn Utzon, the original architect of the Sydney Opera House, for what Snelling derided as "his sculpture on Bennelong Point". His architectural career and his relationships with his fellow architects had reached their end. In April 1975, Phnom Penh, capital of the Kymer Republic fell to the Kymer Rouge, ending Snelling's socially-prestigious role as its honorary consul-general.

After Patricia's death in 1976, he moved with his teenage sons to Honolulu, where he married Swedish artist Marianne Sparre in the early 1980s. In 1985, he was concerned enough about his failing health to suddenly book a flight back to Sydney, where he died several days later of a brain aneurism.

== Snelling and looted antiquities ==
In a June 2022 episode of the ABC Radio National current affairs series Background Briefing, it was reported that, during his time in Asia, Snelling had acquired many pieces of rare Khmer art for his private collection via the black market, knowing them to have been looted.

Snelling exhibited his collection of Kymer artifacts at the Australian Museum, in 1974. At the time, the collection was said to be worth $A280,000. The exhibition was opened by Chhut Chhoeur, the Ambassador of the Khmer Republic, which fell to the Kymer Rouge in 1975. He had obtained about twenty artifacts in 1965. Apart from a few small pieces he said were given to him by members of the Cambodian Royal Family, he stated, in an excerpt from a personal letter he wrote during this time, that the rest were purchased "outside the borders of Cambodia", presumably in Thailand.

In the same personal letter, Snelling bragged about how cheaply he had acquired the Khmer antiquities; he revealed that he knew those antiquities were from Angkor Wat; he derided the people he purchased the items from as "ignorant peasants"; and he described in detail how he had shipped various items home to Sydney but had kept others with him so that he could successfully smuggle them out of Thailand. The ABC report also cited evidence, discovered in a 1970s episode of the ABC-TV current affairs series Four Corners, when Snelling was interviewed about design at his Sydney home, in which many key Khmer items in his collection are clearly visible. Most but not all of the collection was sold off before Snelling left Australia, and Background Briefing was able to trace several of these looted pieces, which are now held by major US institutions, including the Norton Simon Museum and the Los Angeles County Museum of Art.

Snelling acquired his collection during the days of the Kymer Republic; its scale was a foretaste of the later, more-widespread looting of Cambodian antiquities, during the period of the Kymer Rouge government (1975–1979) and the subsequent two decades of their insurgency, when antiquities were smuggled out and fenced through Western art dealers, including Douglas Latchford.
