= Australian Institute of Architects Gold Medal =

Award

The Australian Institute of Architects Gold Medal is the highest individual award of the Australian Institute of Architects, awarded annually since 1960. The award was created to recognise distinguished service by Australian architects who have:

- designed or executed buildings of high merit;
- produced work of great distinction resulting in the advancement of architecture; or
- endowed the profession of architecture in a distinguished manner.

== Recipients ==
- 1960 Leslie Wilkinson OBE (1882—1973), New South Wales
- 1961 Louis Laybourne Smith CMG (1880—1965), South Australia
- 1962 Joseph Charles Fowell (1891—1970), New South Wales
- 1963 Sir Arthur George Stephenson (1890—1967), Victoria
- 1964 Cobden Parkes (1892—1978), New South Wales
- 1965 Sir Walter Paul Osborn McCutcheon (1899–1983), Victoria
- 1966 William (Bill) Rae Laurie (1904—1970), New South Wales
- 1967 William Purves Race Godfrey, Victoria
- 1968 Sir Roy Grounds (1905—1981), Victoria
- 1969 Robin Boyd CBE (1919—1971), Victoria
- 1970 Jack Hobbs McConnell (1913—2005), South Australia
- 1971 Frederick Bruce Lucas (1898—1873), Queensland
- 1972 Edward (Ted) Harbert Farmer CBE (1909—2001), New South Wales
- 1973 Jørn Utzon AC (1918—2008), Denmark
- 1974 Raymond Berg AM (1913—1989), Victoria
- 1975 Sydney Ancher (1904—1979), New South Wales
- 1976 Harry Seidler AC OBE (1923—2006), New South Wales
- 1977 Ronald Andrew Gilling (1917—2005), New South Wales
- 1978 Mervyn Henry Parry (1913—2006), Western Australia
- 1979 Bryce Mortlock AM (1921—2004), New South Wales
- 1980 John Andrews AO (1933—2022), New South Wales
- 1981 Colin Madigan AO (1921—2011), New South Wales
- 1982 Sir John Overall CBE (1913—2001), ACT
- 1983 Gilbert Nicol (1925—2010) & Ross Chisholm (1931—1998), [Cameron Chisholm Nicol] Western Australia
- 1984 Philip Cox AO (1939–), New South Wales
- 1985 Peter Johnson AC (1923—2003), New South Wales
- 1986 Richard Butterworth (1924–2000), Victoria
- 1987 Daryl Jackson AO (1937—2026), Victoria
- 1988 Romaldo Giurgola AO (1920—2016), ACT
- 1989 Robin Gibson AO (1930—2014), Queensland
- 1990 Peter McIntyre AO (1928—), Victoria
- 1991 Donald Bailey AM (1927—2025), Western Australia
- 1992 Glenn Murcutt AO (1936—), New South Wales
- 1993 Ken Woolley AO (1933—2015), New South Wales
- 1994 Neville Quarry AM (1933–2004), New South Wales
- 1995 No Award
- 1996 John Denton, William Corker & Barry Marshall, Denton Corker Marshall, Victoria
- 1997 Roy McCowan Simpson AO (1914—1997), Victoria
- 1998 Gabriel Poole (1934—2020), Queensland
- 1999 Richard Leplastrier AO (1939—), New South Wales
- 2000 John Morphett AM OBE (1932—2016), South Australia
- 2001 Keith Cottier AM (1938—), New South Wales
- 2002 Brit Andresen (1945—), Queensland
- 2003 Peter Corrigan AM (1941—2016) & Maggie Edmond AM (1946—) (added in 2023), [Edmond Corrigan], Victoria
- 2004 Gregory Burgess (1945—), Victoria
- 2005 James Birrell (1928—2019), Queensland
- 2006 Kerry Hill AO (1943—2018), Western Australia
- 2007 Enrico Taglietti AO (1926—2019), ACT
- 2008 Richard Johnson AO MBE (1946—), New South Wales
- 2009 Ken Maher AO (1948—), New South Wales
- 2010 Kerry Clare & Lindsay Clare, Queensland
- 2011 Graeme Gunn AM (1933—2024), Victoria
- 2012 Lawrence Nield (1941—), New South Wales
- 2013 Peter Wilson (1950—), Victoria/Germany
- 2014 Phil Harris & Adrian Welke, [Troppo Architects], Northern Territory
- 2015 Peter Stutchbury (1954—), New South Wales
- 2016 ARM Architecture (Ashton Raggatt McDougall), Victoria
- 2017 Peter Elliott AM (1950—), Victoria
- 2018 Alexander Tzannes AM (1950—), New South Wales
- 2019 Hank Koning & Julie Eizenberg, [Koning Eizenberg Architecture], California, USA
- 2020 John Wardle (1956—), Victoria
- 2021 Donald Robert (Don) Watson (1945—), Victoria
- 2022 Sean Godsell (1960—), Victoria
- 2023 Kerstin Thompson (1965—), Victoria
- 2023 Maggie Edmond AM (see 2003 above), Victoria
- 2024 Philip Thalis, New South Wales
- 2025 Timothy Hill, Queensland
- 2026 Neil Durbach, Camilla Block & David Jaggers, [Durbach Block Jaggers], New South Wales
- 2027 Susan Dugdale, Northern Territory

== Distribution of Gold Medals ==
Gold Medals by Australian state or territory 1960—2027, (total 68 awards)
1. New South Wales (38.2%)
2. Victoria (27.9%)
3. Queensland (10.3%)
4. Tasmania (0.00%)
5. Western Australia (7.40%)
6. South Australia (5.10%)
7. Australian Capital Territory (4.40%)
8. Northern Territory (2.20%)
9. International (4.40%)

== See also ==
- Australian Institute of Architects Awards and Prizes
