= Richard Johnson (architect) =

Australian architect (born 1946)

Richard Anthony Johnson AO, MBE
- Born: 11 May 1946 (age 80); Sydney, New South Wales
- Education: University of New South Wales, University College London
- Occupation: Architect
- Awards: RAIA Gold Medal; 2008
- Practice: Johnson Pilton Walker
- Buildings: Governor Phillip Tower, Sydney; National Portrait Gallery, Canberra
- Projects: Museum of Sydney
- Design: National Gallery of Victoria – Redevelopment Masterplan

Richard Anthony Johnson AO, MBE (born 11 May 1946) is an Australian architect best known as the creator of some of the Australian most important and iconic cultural buildings and spaces of the twentieth century.

== Academic career ==
Johnson graduated in 1969 with first class honours in Architecture from the University of New South Wales and a Master of Philosophy in Town Planning from the University College London in 1977. He has held several academic positions including Adjunct Professor of Architecture, at the University of NSW between 1999 and 2008; and a professor of practice/architectural studies, at the University of NSW since 2008.

Professional associations include appointment as a Life Fellow of the Royal Australian Institute of Architects in 2011; a Fellow of the Royal Australian Institute of Architects in 2005; an Associate of the Design Institute of Australia; an Associate of the Japan Institute of Architects; and a Registered Architect in the State of New South Wales.

== Professional experience ==
- 1969–1985 Principal Architect, Department of Housing and Construction
- 1985–2000 Director, Denton Corker Marshall Pty Ltd

In 2001 the Sydney-based Directors of Denton Corker Marshall (DCM), Richard Johnson, Adrian Pilton and Jeff Walker de-merged the Sydney office from the group and renamed the office Johnson Pilton Walker Pty Ltd — a multi-design disciplinary firm currently working on a wide range of projects in Australia, China and New Zealand. Kiong Lee, Paul van Ratingen and Graeme Dix joined the practice as Directors.

- 2000–present, Director, Johnson Pilton Walker Pty Ltd

== Projects ==
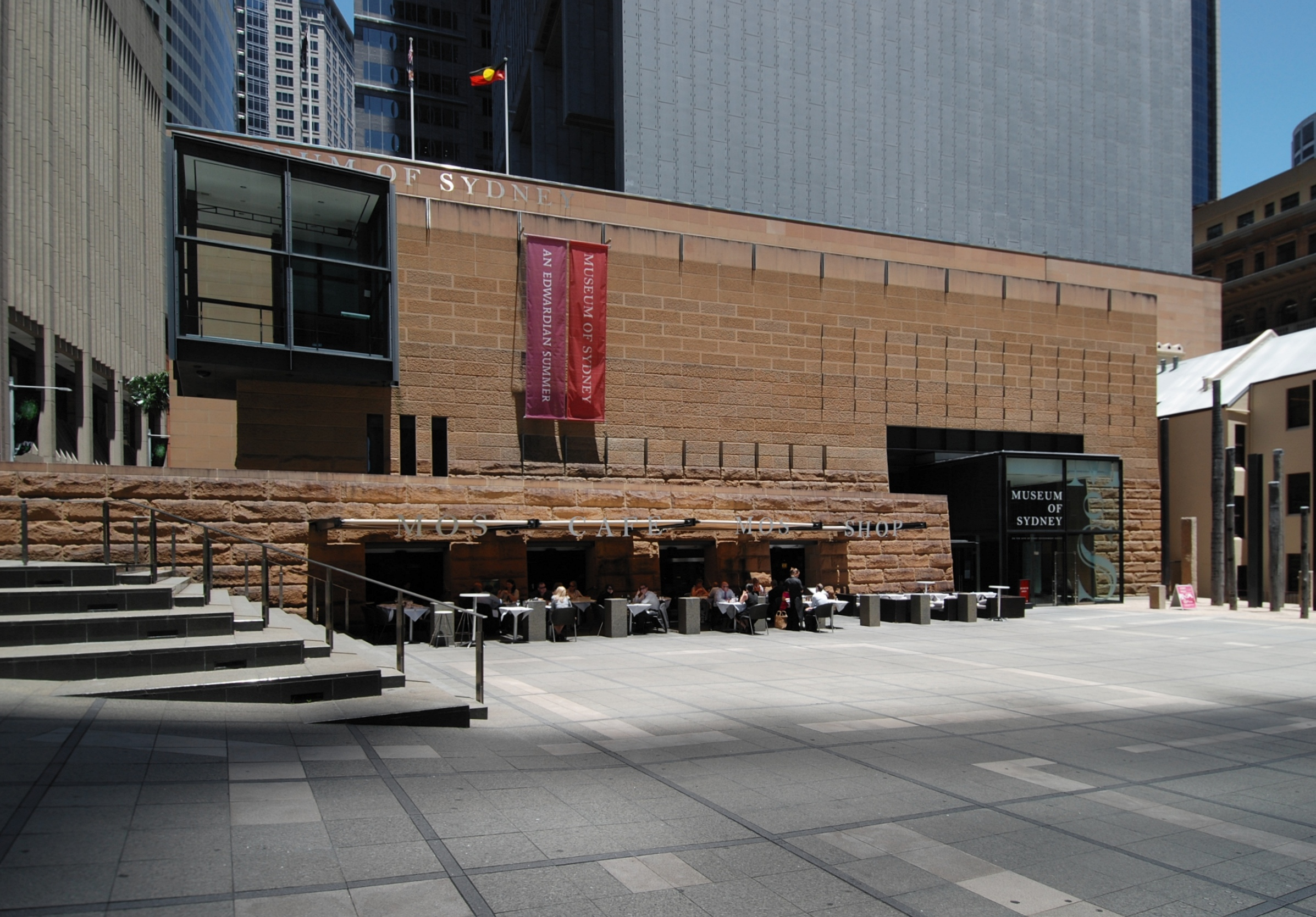
Museum of Sydney, 1995

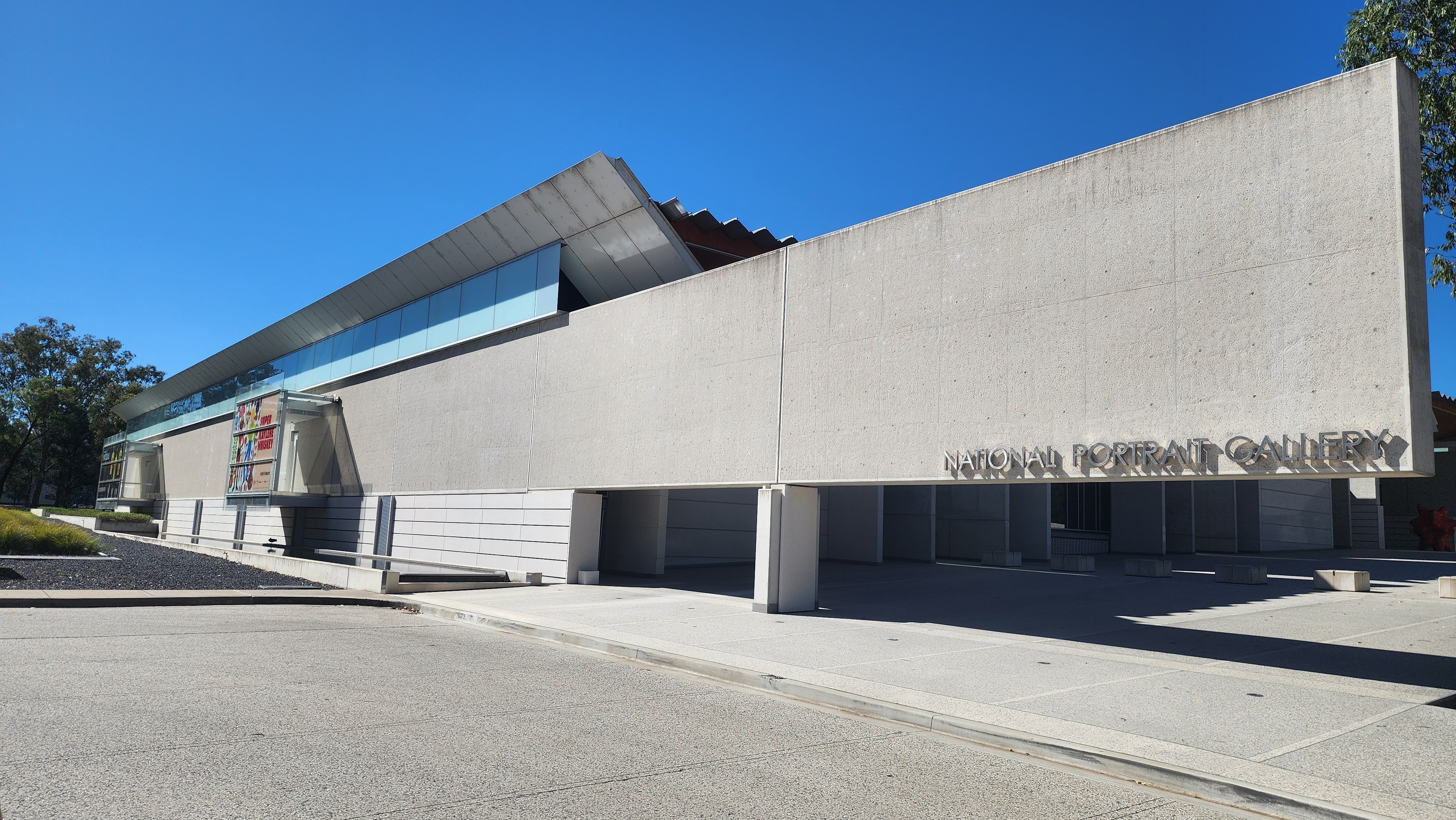
National Portrait Gallery, Canberra

Some of Johnson's major projects have included:.

- Australian Pavilion Expo '74 in Spokane (USA) (as assistant to James Maccormick)
- Australian Pavilion Expo '75 in Okinawa (Japan)
- Australian Pavilion Expo '85 in Tsukuba (Japan)
- Australia Post Pavilion and Exhibits at Expo 88 (Brisbane)
- Queensland News Pavilion and Exhibits – Expo 88 (Brisbane)
- Spanish Pavilion and Exhibits – Expo 88 (Brisbane)
- Australian Embassy, Beijing
- Australian Embassy, Tokyo, masterlan
- Museum of Sydney, 1995
- Art Gallery of NSW, New Asian Gallery, 2004
- Art Gallery of NSW masterplan, 2007
- Art Gallery of NSW forecourt and ramp, 2011
- Sydney Opera House masterplan and refurbishments (with Jørn Utzon)
- First Government House Place, Sydney
- Australian Museum – New Zoology Building
- Westpac Headquarters, Sydney
- Australian National Maritime Museum – Masterplan
- National Portrait Gallery, Canberra, 2009
- Tasmanian Museum and Art Gallery in Hobart – Masterplan
- National Gallery of Victoria – Redevelopment Masterplan and Feasibility Study

== Honours ==
=== Australian civil honours ===
At age 30 Johnson was appointed Member of the Order of the British Empire (MBE) on 12 June 1976 for Public Service in the field of architecture, with a citation of "For service with Sub–Treasury at Australia House in London."

In the 2014 Australia Day Honours list on 26 January 2014, Johnson was appointed an Officer of the Order of Australia (AO) "for distinguished service to architecture, particularly the design of iconic Australian public buildings, to the visual arts and the museum and galleries sector, and to professional associations."

=== RAIA Gold Medal ===
Richard Johnson was awarded the RAIA Gold Medal by the Royal Australian Institute of Architects on 13 March 2008. The RAIA National President Alec Tzannes said the medal recognised Johnson's "executed work of exceptional merit, and his outstanding contribution to the development of the profession in Australia".

=== Other honours ===
In 2012 was appointed Life Governor of the Art Gallery of New South Wales.
