= Robin Boyd Award =

Highest Australian architecture award for new houses

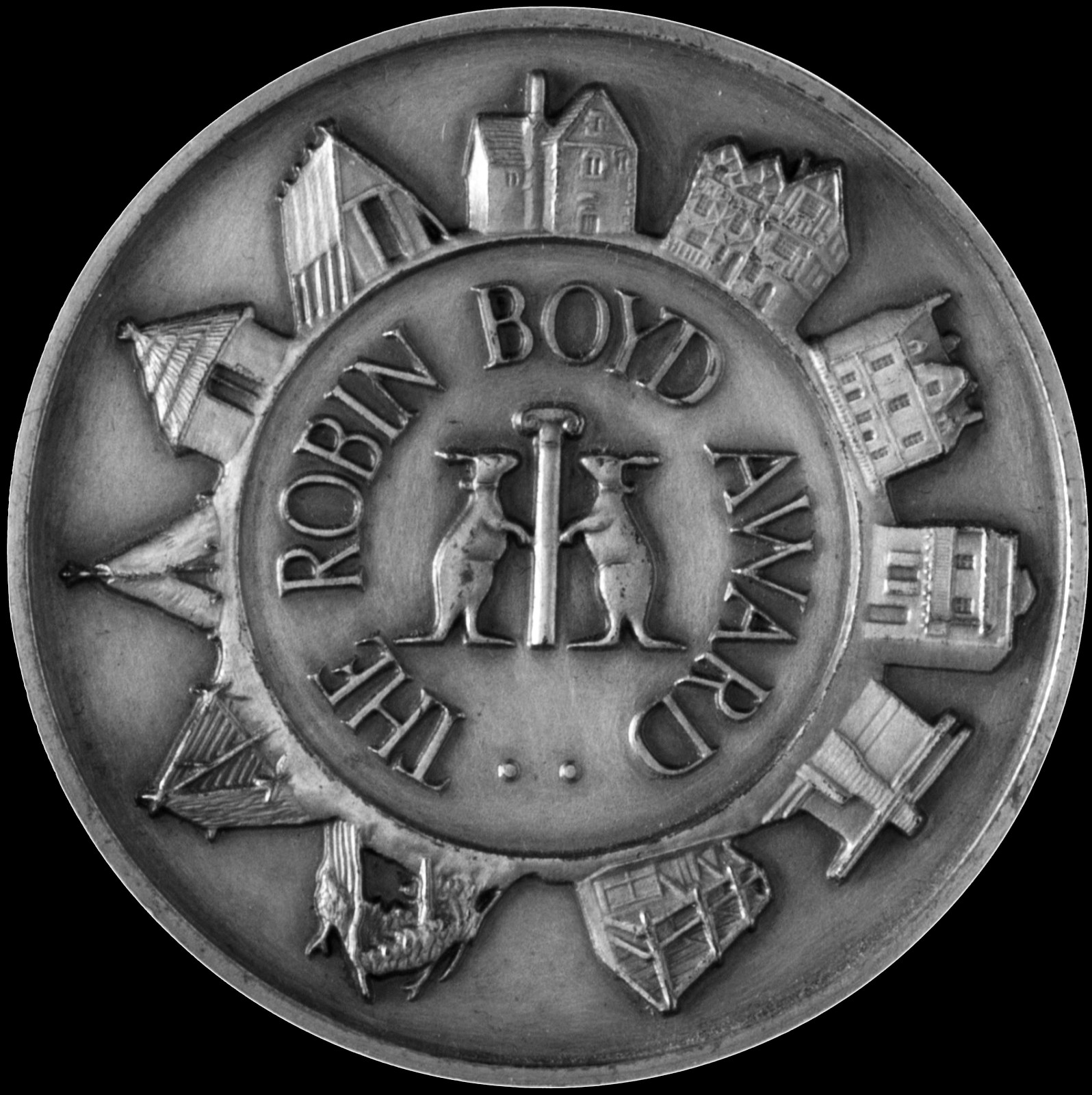
- Robin Boyd Medal
- Awarded for: Highest Australian award for Residential Architecture, New Houses
- Country: Australia
- Presented by: Australian Institute of Architects
- First award: 1981; 45 years ago
- Currently held by: Officer Woods Architects for Eric Street, 2026
- Website: www.architecture.com.au/awards

The Robin Boyd Award for Residential Architecture, Houses (New) is an Australian national architecture prize presented annually by the Australian Institute of Architects since 1981.

== Background ==
The award is for achievement in residential architecture, and specifically new houses. Alongside the named award, secondary awards are given including a 'National Award' and 'National Commendation' to highly regarded entries. Projects in this category must be residential in nature, generally falling within BCA Class 1a and must be new buildings. Projects with up to two self-contained dwellings may be entered in this category.

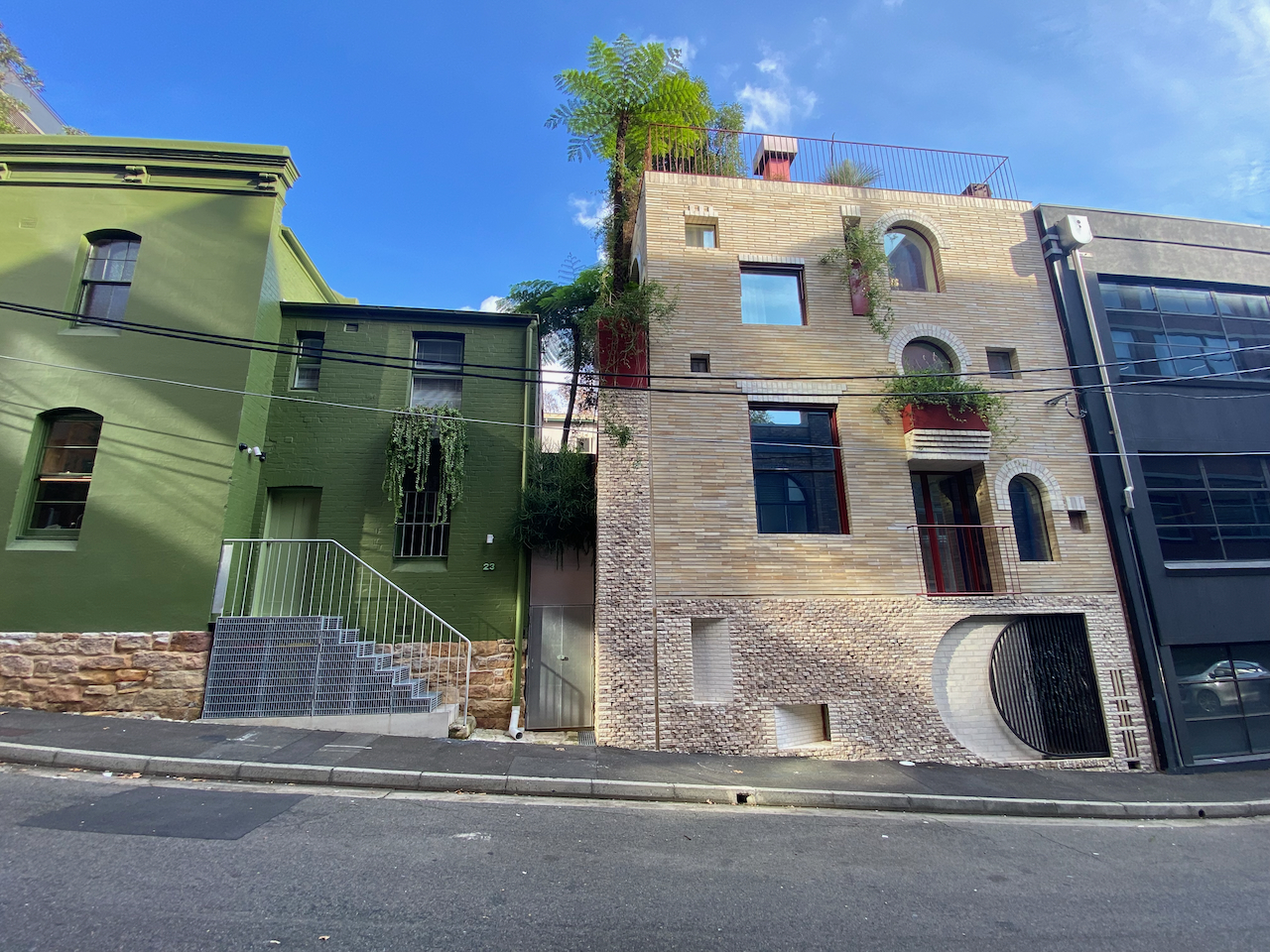
2023 Robin Boyd Award, 19 Waterloo Street, Surry Hills by SJB Architects

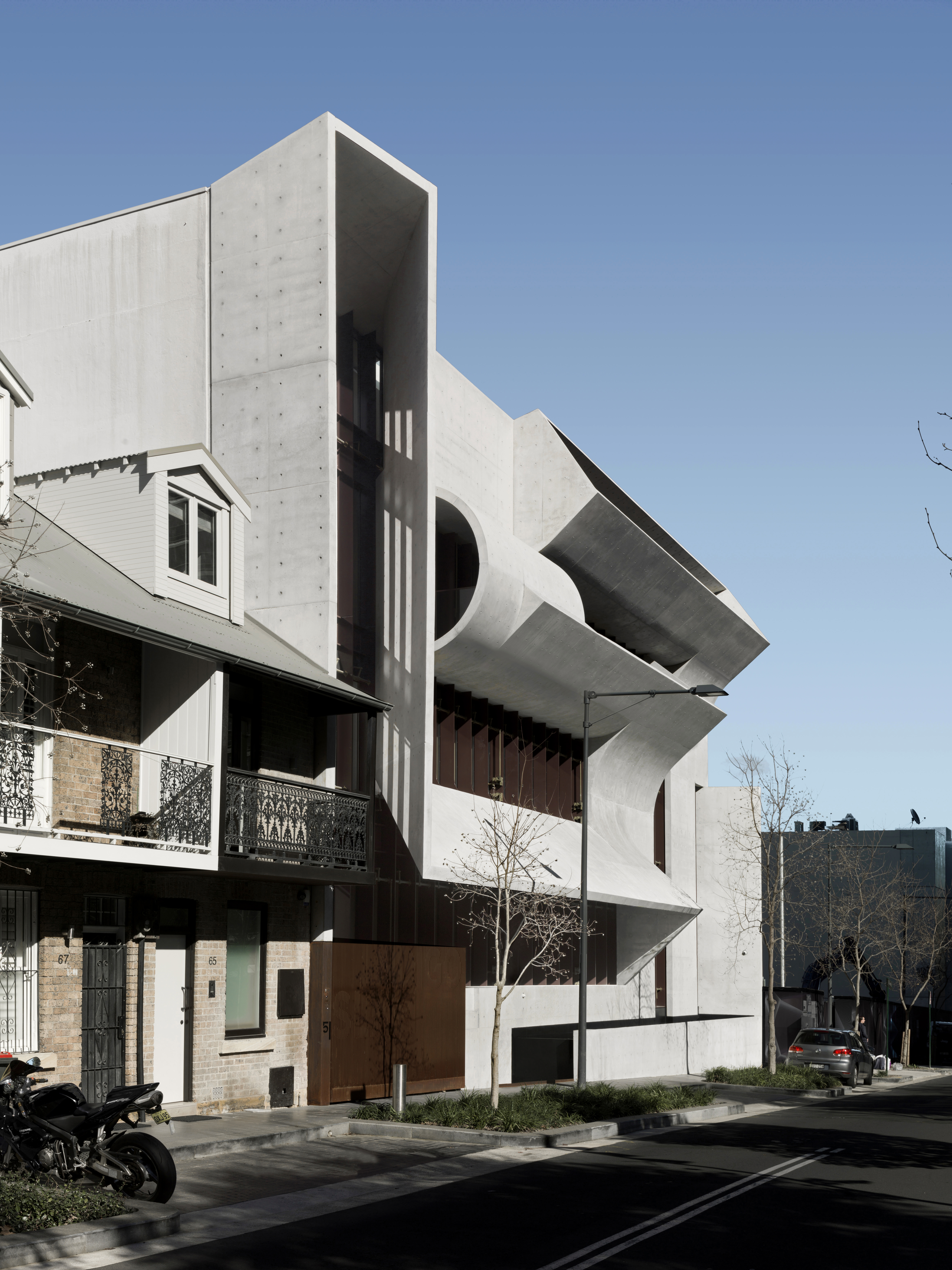
2016 Robin Boyd Award, 'Indigo Slam' by Smart Design Studio

=== Naming of the award ===
The award is presented in memory of the Australian architect Robin Boyd CBE (1919—1971), and is awarded to residential architecture that sets benchmarks for meeting client's needs, responding to the site and providing shelter that is at the leading edge of house design.

== Multiple winners ==
Sydney based architect Peter Stutchbury has been awarded the Robin Boyd Award on four occasions; 2003, 2005, 2020 and 2021.

The office of Durbach Block Jaggers based in Kings Cross, Sydney has won the award three times; in 1998 and 2004 (as Durbach Block) and 2017.

Two time winners include Glenn Murcutt, Lindsay Clare, John Wardle, Timothy Hill, Sean Godsell, Alexander Tzannes, Kerstin Thompson, Troppo Architects and Denton Corker Marshall.

== List of recipients ==
Robin Boyd Awards by year
Year	Winner	Project	Location	State	Other RAIA/AIA Awards
1981	Glenn Murcutt	Two Houses (Nicholas and Carruthers Houses)	Mount Irvine	NSW	Wilkinson Award, 1982; Blacket Prize, 1983 (NSW)
1982	No Award				
1983	McIntyre Partnership	Sea House	Caraar Creek Lane, Beleura Hill, Mornington	Victoria	
1984	Louise St John Kennedy	Downes–Stoney Residence	East Perth	WA	
1985	Glenn Murcutt	Magney House	Bingie Bingie Point, New South Wales	NSW	National Award for Enduring Architecture, 2011; New South Wales Enduring Architecture Award, 2011; Wilkinson Award, 1985
1986	Geoffrey Pie Architects/Planners	Pie Residence	Peregian Beach	Queensland	Robin Gibson Award for Enduring Architecture, 2012 (QLD)
1987	Ken Woolley (Ancher Mortlock Woolley)	Palm Beach House	21 Florida Road, Palm Beach	NSW	Wilkinson Award, 1987
1988	Alexander Tzannes	Henwood House	159 Windsor Street, Paddington	NSW	Wilkinson Award, 1988
1989	Don Watson	Campbell House/Graceville House	35 Molonga Terrace, Graceville	Queensland	
1990	Alex Popov Architects	Griffin House	8a Rockley Street, Castlecrag	NSW	Wilkinson Award, 1990
1991	Gabriel Poole (Joint Winner)	Tent House	Eumundi	Queensland	
1991	Dale Jones–Evans (Joint Winner)	Gallery House	23 Morang Road, Hawthorn	Victoria	
1992	Lindsay Clare Architects	Clare House	Buderim	Queensland	
1993	Gordon & Valich (Joint Winner)	Palm Beach House	7 Northview Road, Palm Beach	NSW	Wilkinson Award, 1993
1993	Hamish Lyon and Astrid Jenkin with Charles Salter (Joint Winner)	Lyon/Jenkin House	Carlton	Victoria	
1993	Troppo Architects (Joint Winner)	Commonwealth Defence Housing Authority, Larrakeyah Housing Precinct 2	Larrakeyah, Darwin	Northern Territory	Tracy Memorial Award, 1993 (NT)
1994	Bud Brannigan	Brannigan Residence	St Lucia	Queensland	
1995	Clare Design (Joint Winner)	Hammond Residence	Cooran	Queensland	
1995	Craig A Rossetti (Joint Winner)	106–112 Cremorne Street (Six Terraces)	Richmond	Victoria	
1996	Ken Latona (Joint Winner)	Alterations to a cottage (Additions to a front verandah)	29 Spicer Street, Woollahra	NSW	
1996	John Mainwaring & Associates (Joint Winner)	Chapman House	Noosa Heads	Queensland	
1997	Alexander Tzannes Associates	Snelling House Perpetua	9 Coorabin Road, Northbridge	NSW	Wilkinson Award, 1997
1998	Durbach Block Architects	Droga Apartment	Foster Street, Surry Hills	NSW	Wilkinson Award, 1998
1999	Denton Corker Marshall (Joint Winner)	Sheep Farm House	Kyneton	Victoria	
1999	Graham Jahn Associates (Joint Winner)	Grant House	1 Esther Street, Surry Hills	NSW	
2000	Denton Corker Marshall	Emery Residence	Cape Schanck	Victoria	
2001	Donovan Hill	D House	Harcourt Street, New Farm	Queensland	House of the Year Award, 2001
2002	Bligh Voller Nield & Troppo Architects	Lavarack Barracks Redevelopment Stage 2	Townsville	Queensland	
2003	Stutchbury and Pape (Joint Winner)	Bay House	Watsons Bay	NSW	NSW Chapter Award for Architecture – Single Housing, 2003
2003	Kerry Hill Architects (Joint Winner)	Ogilvie House	68 Seaview Terrace, Sunshine Beach	Queensland	
2004	Durbach Block Architects	House Spry	Point Piper	NSW	NSW Chapter Award for Architecture – Single Housing, 2004
2005	Stutchbury and Pape	Springwater	Seaforth	NSW	NSW Chapter Award for Architecture – Single Housing, 2005
2006	Sean Godsell Architects	St Andrews Beach House	St Andrews Beach	Victoria	Victoria Chapter, Residential Architecture Award – New Houses, 2006
2007	Paul Morgan Architects	Cape Schanck House	Bass Vista Boulevard, Cape Schanck	Victoria	Victoria Chapter, Residential Architecture Award – New Houses, 2007
2008	McBride Charles Ryan	Klein Bottle House	166 Avon Road, Rye	Victoria	Harold Desbrowe-Annear Award for Residential Architecture, 2008
2009	Chenchow Little Architects	Freshwater House	Freshwater	NSW	NSW Chapter, Residential Architecture Award – New Houses, 2009
2010	HBV Architects (James Jones)	House at Trial Bay	3101 Channel Highway, Kettering	Tasmania	Tasmania Chapter, Esmond Dorney Award (Residential Architecture), 2010
2011	Neeson Murcutt Architects	Castlecrag House	325 Edinburgh Road, Castlecrag	NSW	Residential Architecture Award – New Houses, 2011 (NSW)
2012	John Wardle Architects	Shearer's Quarters	North Bruny Island	Tasmania	Tasmania Chapter, Colorbond Award for Steel Architecture, 2012; Tasmania Chapter, Esmond Dorney Award (Residential Architecture), 2012
2013	John Wardle Architects	Fairhaven Beach House	Fairhaven Beach, Fairhaven	Victoria	Victoria Chapter, Residential Architecture Award – New Houses, 2013 (1 of 3 awarded)
2014	Kerstin Thompson Architects	House at Hanging Rock	Hanging Rock	Victoria	Harold Desbrowe-Annear Award for Residential Architecture, 2014
2015	Jesse Bennett Architect	Planchonella House	Cairns	Queenslamd	Queensland Chapter, Robin Dods Award for Residential Architecture, 2015; 2015 Houses Awards: Australian House of the Year
2016	Smart Design Studio	Indigo Slam	63 O'Connor Street, Chippendale	NSW	Wilkinson Award, 2016; Emil Sodersten Award for Interior Architecture (National), 2017; NSW Architecture Award for Interior Architecture, 2017; World Architecture Festival (INSIDE) Awards, Residential (International), 2016
2017	Durbach Block Jaggers	Tamarama House	23 Kenneth Street, Tamarama	NSW	Wilkinson Award, 2017
2018	Sean Godsell Architects	House on the Coast	Mornington Peninsula	Victoria	Victoria Chapter, Residential Architecture Award – New Houses, 2018 (1 of 3 awarded)
2019	Partners Hill (Timothy Hill)	Daylesford Longhouse	178 Mannings Road, Elevated Plains, Daylesford	Victoria	Victoria Chapter, Residential Architecture Award – New Houses, 2019 (1 of 5 awarded)
2020	Peter Stutchbury Architecture (Joint Winner)	Basin Beach House	Basin Beach, Mona Vale	NSW	NSW Chapter, Residential Architecture Award – New Houses, 2020 (1 of 5 awarded)
2020	Kerstin Thompson Architects (Joint Winner)	East Street	350 East Street, East Albury	NSW	NSW Chapter, Residential Architecture Award – New Houses, 2021 (1 of 5 awarded)
2021	Peter Stutchbury Architecture	Night Sky	Blackheath	NSW	NSW Chapter, Residential Architecture Award – New Houses, 2021 (1 of 5 awarded)
2022	No Award				
2023	SJB (Adam Haddow)	19 Waterloo Street	19 Waterloo Street, Surry Hills	NSW	Wilkinson Award, 2023 (NSW); Commendation, New House (under 200m^{2}), Houses Awards; Commendation, Residential Design, AIDA
2024	Edition Office	Naples Street House	17 Naples Street, Box Hill South, Victoria	Victoria	Harold Desbrowe-Annear Award, Residential Architecture – Houses (New), 2024 (Victoria)
2025	Studio Bright	Hedge and Arbour House	Ivanhoe, Victoria	Victoria	Harold Desbrowe-Annear Award, Residential Architecture – Houses (New), 2025 (Victoria)
2026	Officer Woods Architects	10 Eric Street	Cottesloe	West Australia	Marshall Clifton Award, Residential Architecture – Houses (New), 2026 (WA); Residential Architecture Award – Multiple Housing, 20216

== 2022 Award ==
In 2022 the following projects were shortlisted for the award:

- Mays Point House, Mays Point, Tasmania — Tanner Architects
- LiveWorkShare House, Samford Village, Queensland — Bligh Graham Architects
- Curl Curl House, Curl Curl, New South Wales — TRIAS (2022 National Award)
- Stable House, Forest Lodge, New South Wales — Sibling Architecture
- Corner House, Flinders, Victoria — Archier (2022 National Commendation)
- Jimmy's House, Goonderup, North Perth, Western Australia — MJA Studio with Studio Roam and IOTA (2022 National Award)

For only the second time, and the first time in forty years, no named award was given by the jury; Tony Giannone (Chair), Caroline Pidcock, Adrian Iredale, Poppy Taylor and Tim Ross.

== 2023 Award ==
The following projects were shortlisted for the 2023 Robin Boyd Award by the AIA:

- 19 Waterloo Street, Surry Hills, Sydney, New South Wales – SJB (2023 Robin Boyd Award)
- Blok Stafford Heights, Stafford Heights, Brisbane, Queensland – Blok Modular with Vokes and Peters
- Celilo Springs, Mount Lawley, Perth, Western Australia – Western Architecture Studio
- Merricks Farmhouse, Mornington Peninsula, Victoria – Michael Lumby with Nielsen Jenkins (2023 National Award)
- Mossy Point House, South Coast, New South Wales – Edition Office (2023 National Commendation)
- Spring Creek Road Farm House, Bannockburn, Victoria – Architect Brew Koch (2023 National Award)
- Triptych, Rural Tasmania – Room 11 Architects

The 2023 jury members were Shannon Battisson (Chair), Shaneen Fantin, William Smart, Stephanie Kitingan and Scott Burchell.

The Robin Boyd Award was presented to Adam Haddow and Stewart Cowan from SJB for 19 Waterloo Street, at the National Awards held in Canberra on 31 October 2023. National Awards were also presented to Merricks Farmhouse by Michael Lumby with Nielsen Jenkins and Spring Creek Road Farm House by Architect Brew Koch. Mossy Point House by Edition office was presented a National Commendation.

"19 Waterloo Street is a spectacular example of a new approach to urban infill. Constructed on the 30 square metres left between a new mixed-use building (a studio apartment and commercial tenancy) and an existing factory, the home shows how hard architecture can work, even on a small footprint. From the moment it comes into view, the home announces itself as something different. Full of colour, the facade disguises the program within, allowing an element of privacy balanced by a sense of generosity to the public street. All the required elements of home are present, with each opening off the central stair. Entry, workspace, kitchen, living and bedroom all have their own character and charm. Each is also light and radiates an overwhelming impression of space and connection to greenery that is not easily achieved within such a hard, industrial fabric. The culmination of the upwards journey is a rooftop garden that provides that final, much-loved element of the Australian home. No function was jettisoned in the small footprint, and the space is successful as a home for two, or as a space to welcome gatherings."

— 2023 National Awards Jury Citation extract

== 2024 Award ==
The following projects were shortlisted for the 2024 Robin Boyd Award by the AIA:

- 27 Rule Street, North Fremantle, Western Australian — Officer Woods
- Burnt Earth Beach House, Anglesea, Victoria — Wardle (2024 National Award)
- Courtyard House, Albert Park, Melbourne, Victoria — Clare Cousins Architects
- James Street, Launceston, Tasmania — Taylor and Hinds Architects
- Kidman Lane, Paddington, Sydney, New South Wales — Plus Minus Design
- Maitland Bay House, Killcare Heights, New South Wales — Studio Bright (2024 National Commendation)
- Naples Street House, Box Hill South, Melbourne, Victoria — Edition Office (2024 Robin Boyd Award)
- Six Ways House, North Fitzroy, Melbourne, Victoria — Kennedy Nolan (2024 National Award)
- Three Gardens House, Adelaide Hills, South Australia — Parabolica

The Award was presented to Edition Office at the National Awards held in Adelaide on 7 November 2024. National Awards were also presented to Burnt Earth Beach House by Wardle and Six Ways House by Kennedy Nolan. Maitland Bay House by Studio Bright was presented a National Commendation.

"Naples Street House represents a brave departure from suburban conventions, offering a considered rethinking of a family home. A deliberately understated facade prioritises the interior through animation of the inhabitants’ daily lives, creating a quiet address to the under-pedestrianised streetscape that finds belonging through form and scale. The low-peaked brick-slip roof references the brick bungalows of the neighbourhood’s past while rejecting contemporary adaptations of the style. The central courtyard becomes the orienting focus of the home. The symmetrical plan, coupled with the varied section, introduces unexpected interplays of light and space. Public programmed rooms converse with one another through the careful placement of apertures, while bedrooms are discreetly tucked away to the landscaped side of the house."

— 2024 National Awards Jury Citation extract

== 2025 Award ==
The following projects were shortlisted for the 2025 Robin Boyd Award by the AIA:

- Ochre House, Canberra, ACT — MYMYMY Architecture
- Lagoon House, Curl Curl, New South Wales — Peter Stutchbury Architecture (2025 National Award)
- Morning Bay House, Morning Bay, Pittwater, New South Wales — Casey Brown Architecture
- New Castle, Merewether, Newcastle, New South Wales — Anthony St John Parsons (2025 National Award)
- Mapleton House, Blackall Range, Sunshine Coast, Queensland — Atelier Chen Hung (2025 National Award)
- Nebraska, Bruny Island, Tasmania — Lara Maeseele
- Hedge and Arbour House, Ivanhoe, Melbourne, Victoria — Studio Bright (2025 Robin Boyd Award)
- Henville Street House, Fremantle, Western Australia — Philip Stejskal Architecture (2025 National Commendation)

== 2026 Award ==
The following projects were shortlisted on 22 July 2026 for the 2026 Robin Boyd Award by the AIA:

- Birdwood, Brisbane, Queensland — Peter Besley (Robin Dods Award 2026)
- Cottesloe House, Cottlesloe, Western Australia — Vokes and Peters with Sam Carter
- Cowrie Hole, Newcastle East, New South Wales — Curious Practice (Wilkinson Award 2026)
- EA House, Southern Highlands, New South Wales — Bokey Grant
- Eric Street, Cottlesloe, Western Australia— Officer Woods Architects (Marshall Clifton Award 2026)
- Eton, North Perth, Western Australia — Vittino Ashe Architects
- House in a Garden, Melbourne, Victoria — Edition Office (Harold Desbrowe-Annear Award 2026)

The Award was presented to Eric Street by Officer Woods Architects at the National Awards held in Brisbane on 29 October 2026. A National Award was also presented to EA House by Bokey Grant. Birdwood by Peter Besley and Eton by Vittino Ashe Architects were presented with National Commendations.

"Eric Street provides a great model for future housing, with a modest but assured architectural approach balanced with skilful planning that allows for dual occupancy for extended family or to sublet as a secondary residence."

— 2026 National Awards Jury Citation extract

== Distribution and location of Awards ==
To 2026 a total of 52 Robin Boyd Awards had been given in the 44 years of the award, with no award given in only two years (1982 and 2022). On seven occasions joint winners have been awarded; 1991, 1993 (three winners), 1995, 1996, 1999, 2003 and 2020.

A total of 80% of the Awards have been given to freestanding houses (42 of 52), and almost half of those to beach houses or holiday houses (19 total). Houses located in remote areas accounts for 35% of the awards, while just 18% of winning projects would be considered inner urban. A total of 18 suburban projects have won the award, around 35% of all Award winners.

Around 48% of awards have been won by projects in metropolitan urban areas, and 52% in non–metropolitan locations. Ten awards have been won in regional Victoria compared with only four awards in regional New South Wales – two of those by Glenn Murcutt — and seven awards in regional Queensland.

To 2026 more than two-thirds of all awards have been won by houses located in New South Wales or Victoria, and 91% of all awards won on the mainland eastern seaboard states of New South Wales (41%), Victoria (29%) and Queensland (21%). No architects or projects from South Australia or ACT have been awarded since the award began in 1981.

The most common site locations for awards have been Sydney beachside or harbourside suburbs (10 awards or 20%), Queensland coastal areas (7 awards) or on the Mornington Peninsula, Victoria (6 awards).

Awards by Australian state or territory, 1981—2026, by location of building (total 52 awards)
1. New South Wales (40.4%)
2. Victoria (28.8%)
3. Queensland (21.2%)
4. Tasmania (3.80%)
5. Western Australia (3.80%)
6. Northern Territory (1.90%)
7. South Australia (0.00%)
8. Australian Capital Territory (0.00%)

== Publications ==
In April 2025 a 408 page compendium of all 50 projects awarded since 1981 was published by Thames & Hudson, titled Australian House: The Robin Boyd Award for Residential Architecture Since 1981.

- Australian Institute of Architects, Australian House: The Robin Boyd Award for Residential Architecture Since 1981, Thames & Hudson, ISBN 9781760764562 (2025)

== See also ==
- Australian Institute of Architects
- Australian Institute of Architects Awards and Prizes
- Robin Boyd
- Victorian Architecture Medal
- Wilkinson Award
