= Louise St John Kennedy =

Australian architect from Perth, Western Australia

Louise St John Kennedy (born 1950) is an Australian architect based in Perth, Western Australia who has practised across Australia and America. She has a degree in psychology from the University of Western Australia (1970) and a Bachelor of Architecture from the University of Melbourne (1978). She continues to practice in Claremont, Western Australia, now as a building designer, interior designer and landscape designer.

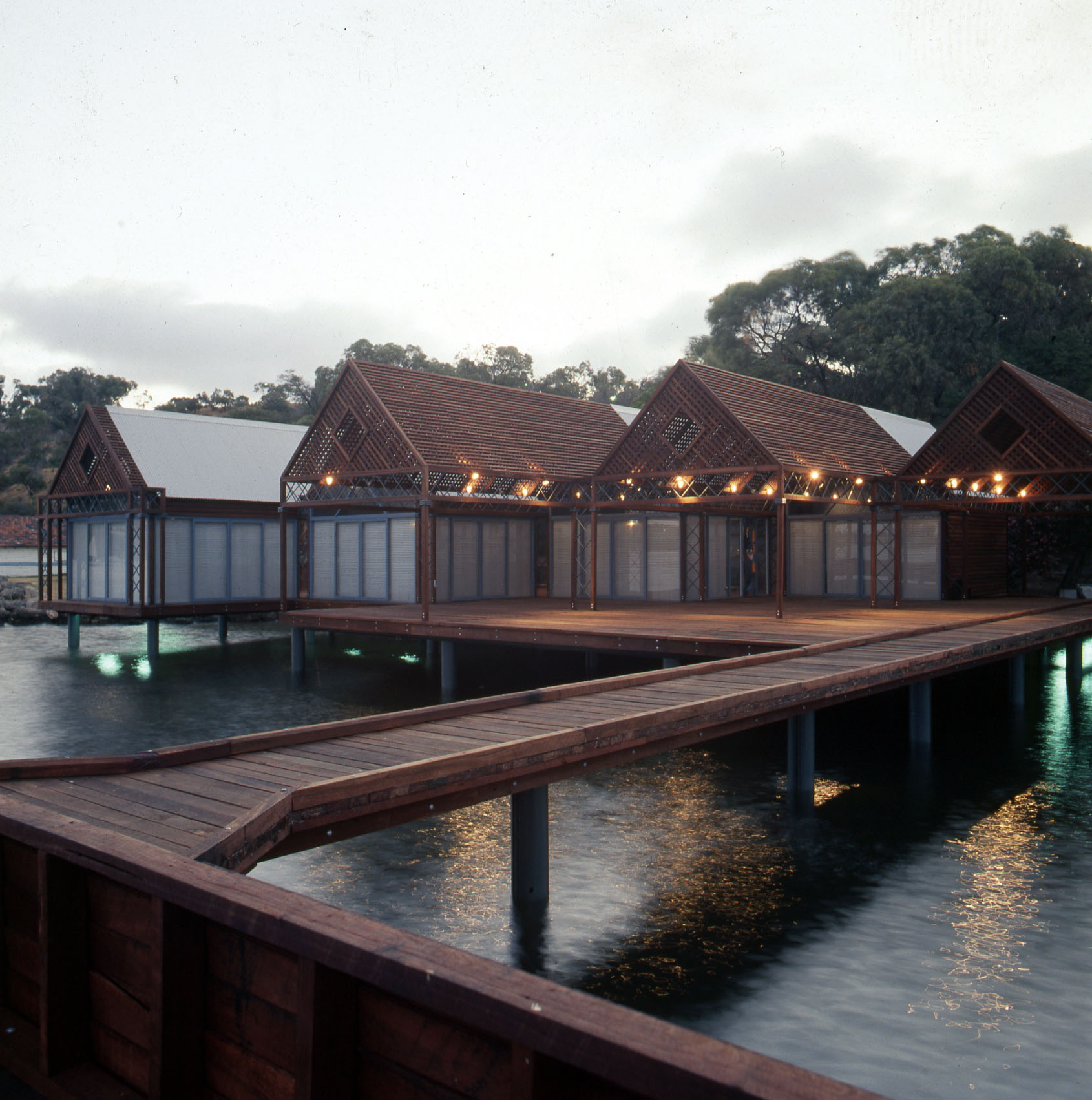
Mosman Bay Tearooms, 1987

== Student years and early practice ==
As a student at the University of Melbourne she worked for a period for Graeme Gunn, and after graduating worked for a period with John Taylor Architect and Builder in South Yarra. Whilst a student she completed a two home renovations for herself, but her first commissioned project came from The Age cartoonist John Spooner to refit his office in Malvern.

After moving back to Perth to work with Robert Cann, St John Kennedy commenced practice in 1981 with the construction of her own house in Rupert Street, Subiaco. Upon completion this house was awarded a commendation in the WA Royal Australian Institute of Architects (RAIA) awards, the first female to receive this honour. It was followed shortly after by the Limestone Residence, Hynes Road, Dalkeith and the Mount Street Gallery Workshops and Residence, Fremantle. Both projects received RAIA awards.

== Career ==
After receiving the Robin Boyd Award from the Australian Institute of Architects in 1984, St John Kennedy completed a large body of work, mainly residential, hospitality and retail, across Western Australia. She has been the architect for Giorgio Armani retail projects throughout Australia.

Her academic involvement includes lecturing on women in architecture at UWA School of Architecture, the first course on women in architecture in Australia. She jointly founded Women in Architecture in Western Australia. She reviewed the civil and criminal justice system in WA for the Law Reform Commission and was a founder internationally of the investigation of architectural psychology in law and courts. St John Kennedy also founded Hay River wines in Mount Barker, one of the first vineyards in south west Western Australia.

== Awards and achievements ==
In 1984, St John Kennedy won the Robin Boyd Award for residential architecture for the Downes-Stoney residence in East Perth. She was the first female recipient of the award and the first Western Australian recipient of the award. She has won numerous other awards, including the Bunnings Timber award 1988, the Fremantle Award 1983, and her work has been widely published.

Louise St John Kennedy was a founding member of the Australian Architecture Association. She was the first woman appointed to both the Architects Board of Western Australia, and the Chapter Council of the RAIA WA. She was appointed to the Architect's Board of Western Australia Accreditation Committee to review Schools of Architecture at Universities in Western Australia. She was an examiner for the Architect's Board of Western Australia. She was a founding board member of the Perth Institute of Contemporary Art, and served on the board at LandCorp, as well as initiating their Design and Sustainability department.

== Notable projects ==
- Downes-Stoney residence, East Perth
- Mosman Bay Tea Rooms, Mosman Park
- Eric and Rinske Carr Gallery Residence and Workshops, Mouat Street, Fremantle
- The Dempster House, Mosman Park
- Eastwood House, Mandurah
- Pines Business Centre, Cottesloe
- Chester Road Housing Development, Claremont
- San Lorenzo Restaurant, Claremont

== Gallery ==
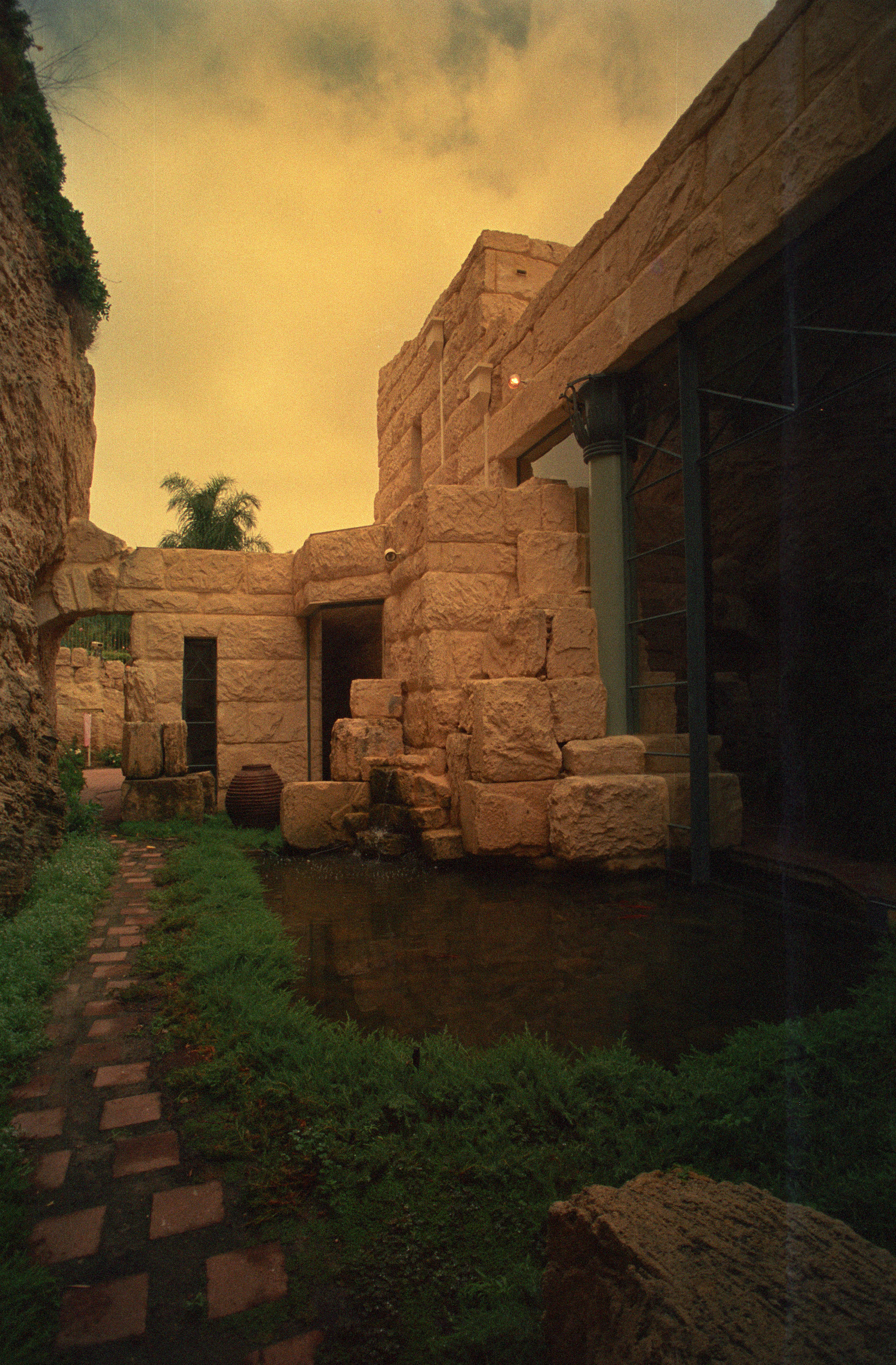
Dempster Residence, 1985

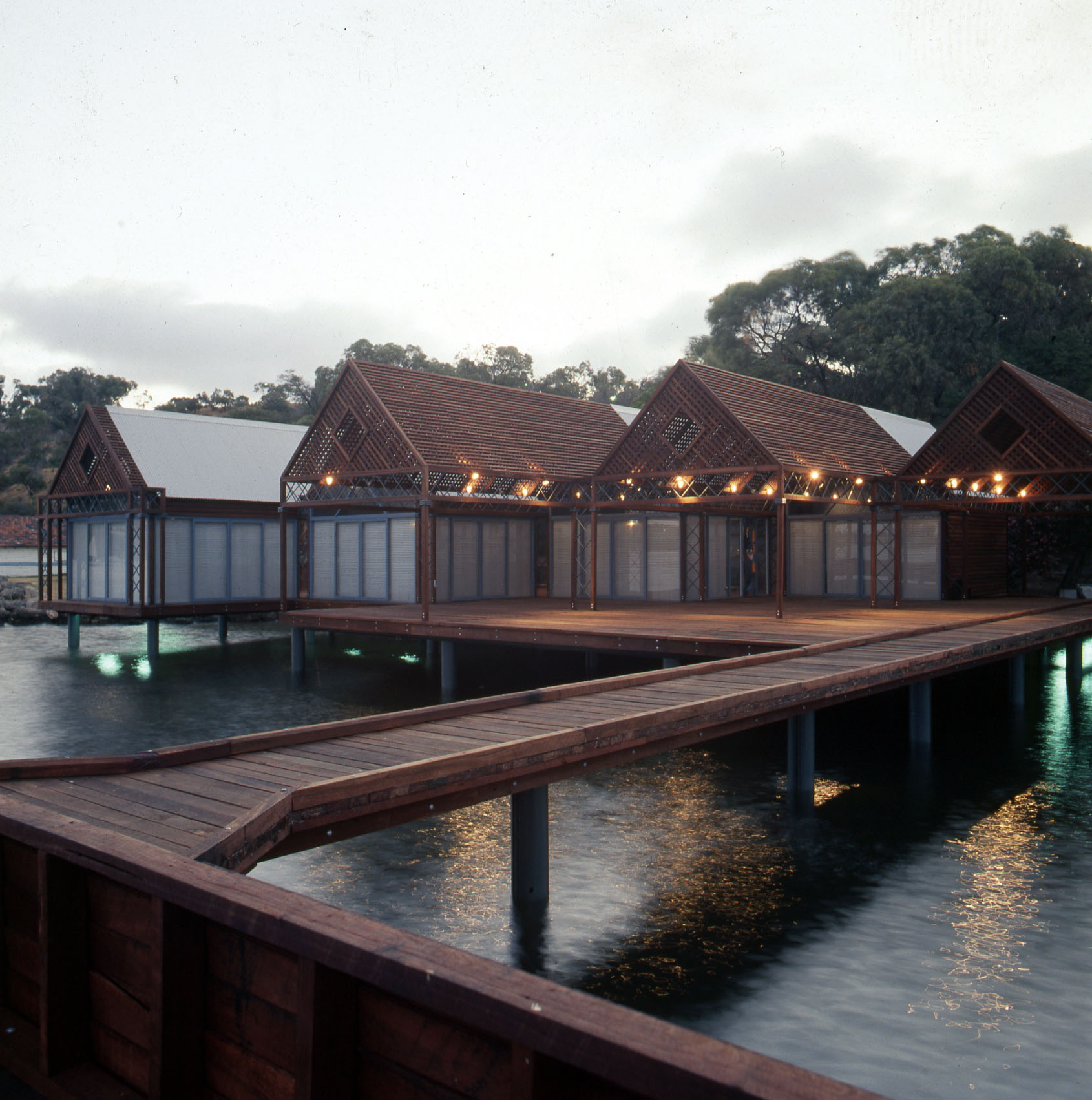
Mosman Bay Tearooms, 1986

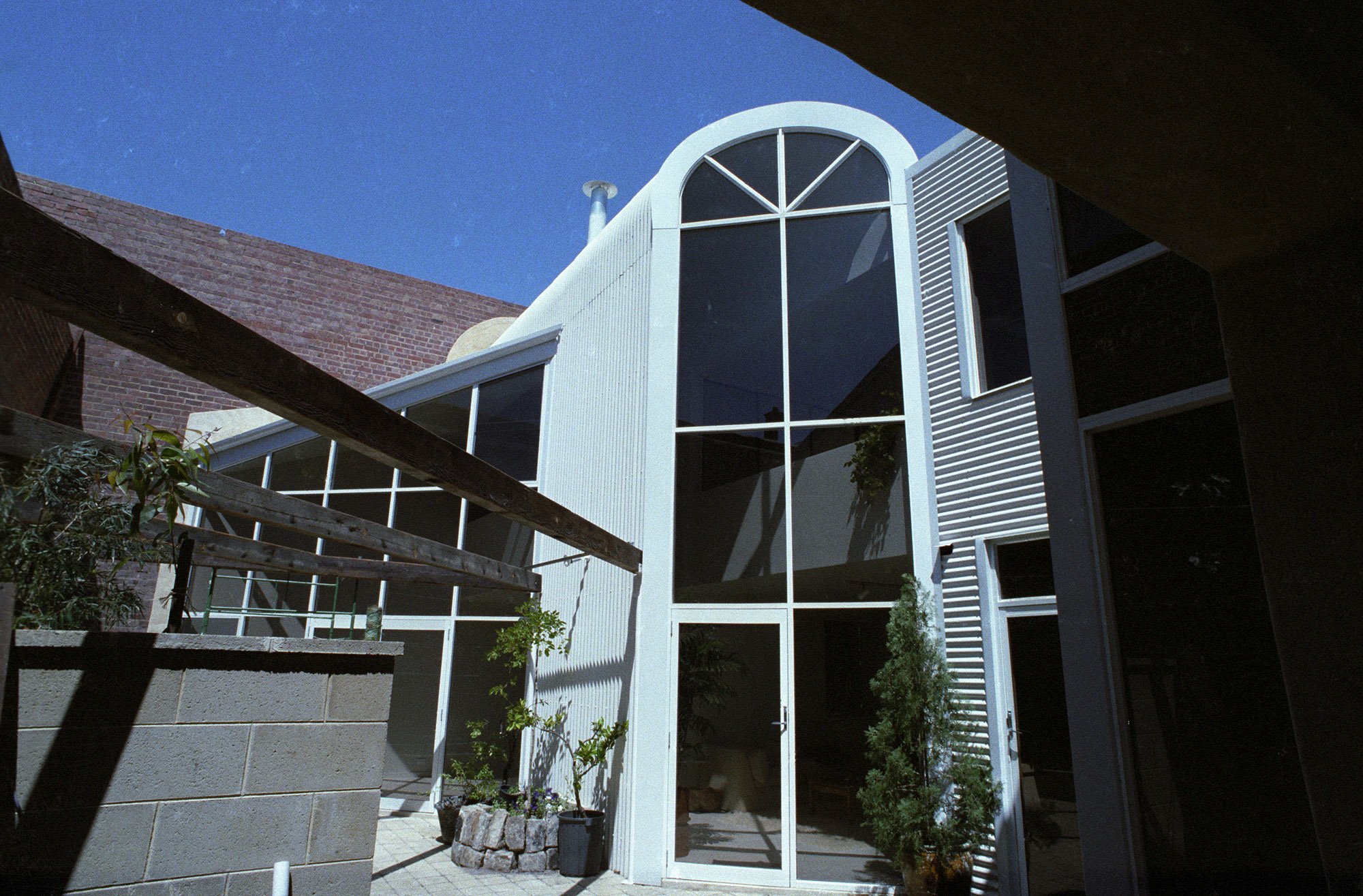
Carr Gallery and Workshops residence, 1982

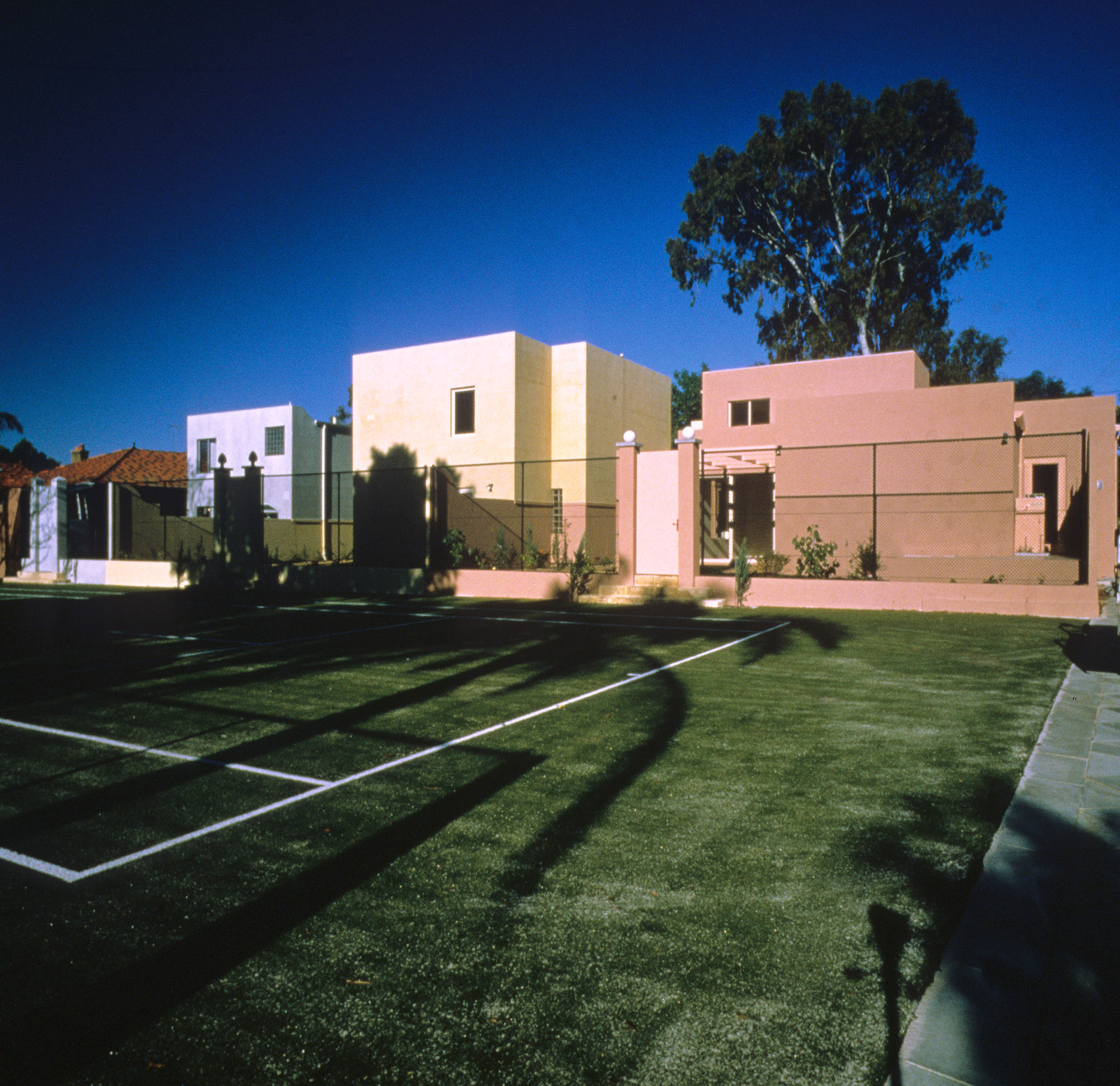
Chester Road Residences, 1987

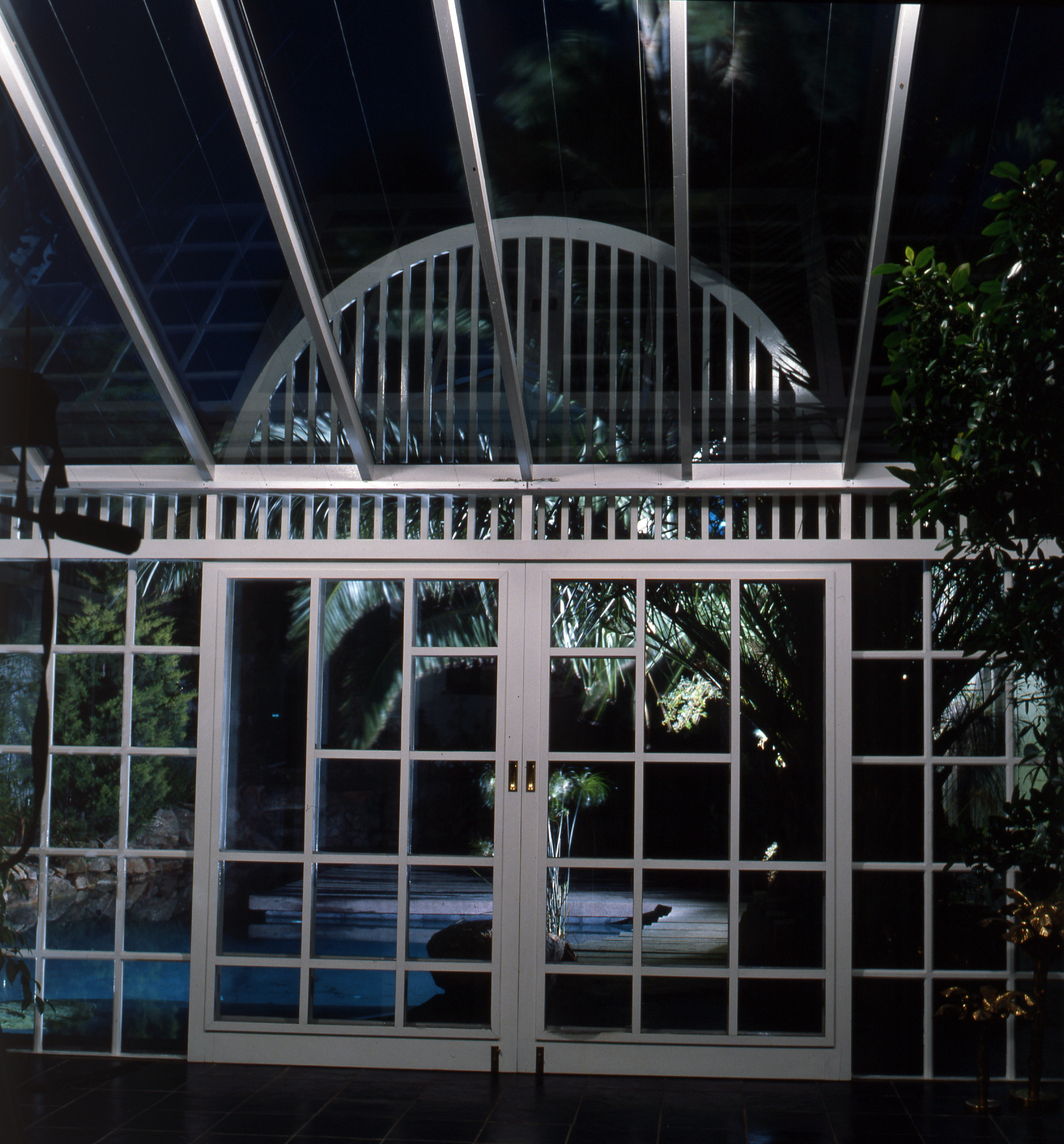
Downe-Stoney House, East Perth, 1983
