= 2026 in architecture =

This article covers 2026 in architecture.

== Buildings and structures ==
=== Australia ===
- Powerhouse Parramatta, expected to open on 7 November 2026 in Sydney
- Appleby Blue Almshouse, Southwark, London

=== Spain ===
- Holy Redeemer Church and Community Centre of Las Chumberas, Santa Cruz de Tenerife

=== United Arab Emirates ===
- Guggenheim Abu Dhabi, designed by the late architect Frank Gehry, is set to open its doors in December.

=== United States ===
- 520 Fifth Avenue, New York City
- Lucas Museum of Narrative Art in Los Angeles, California opened on 22 September.

== Awards ==
- Australian Institute of Architects Gold Medal – Neil Durbach, Camilla Block and David Jaggers (Durbach Block Jaggers)
- Pritzker Architecture Prize – Smiljan Radić Clarke
- Stirling Prize – Mary Duggan Architects with RUFF Architects for Lion Green Road, Coulsdon, Croydon

== Deaths ==
- 15 January – Francesco Gurrieri, 87, Italian architect
- 16 January – Murad Hasratyan, 90, Armenian architectural historian
- 18 January – Liu Thai Ker, 87, Singaporean architect and urban planner
- 21 February – Daryl Jackson, 89, Australian architect
- 22 May – Israel Goodovitch, 92, Israeli architect
- 14 June – Lorcan O'Herlihy, 66, Irish architect
- 26 June – Bill Valentine, 88, American architect (HOK)
- 7 September – Carl Abbott, 90, American architect (Sarasota School of Architecture)

== See also ==
- Timeline of architecture
