= Infinity pool =

Pool designed to seemingly have no edges

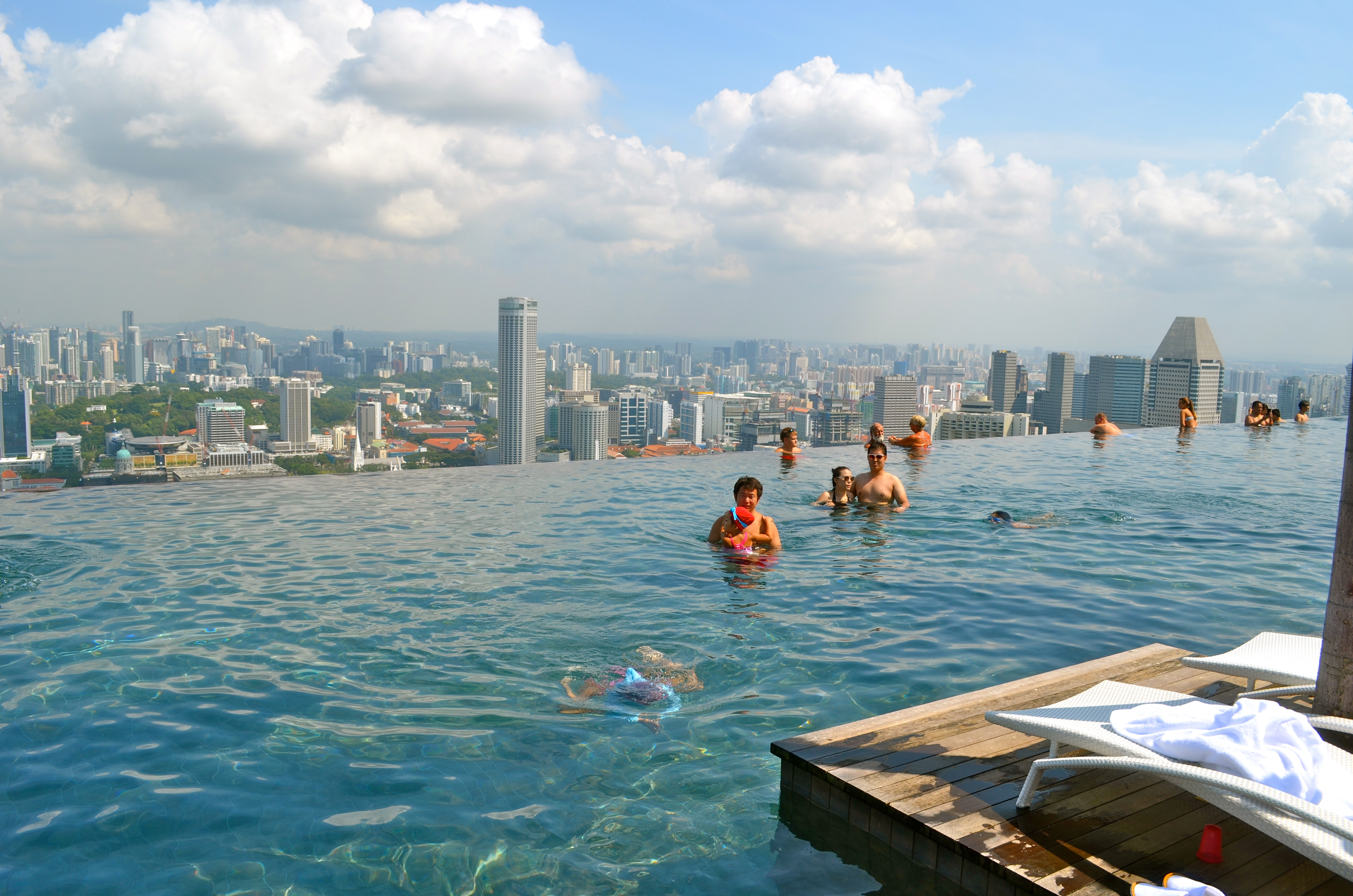
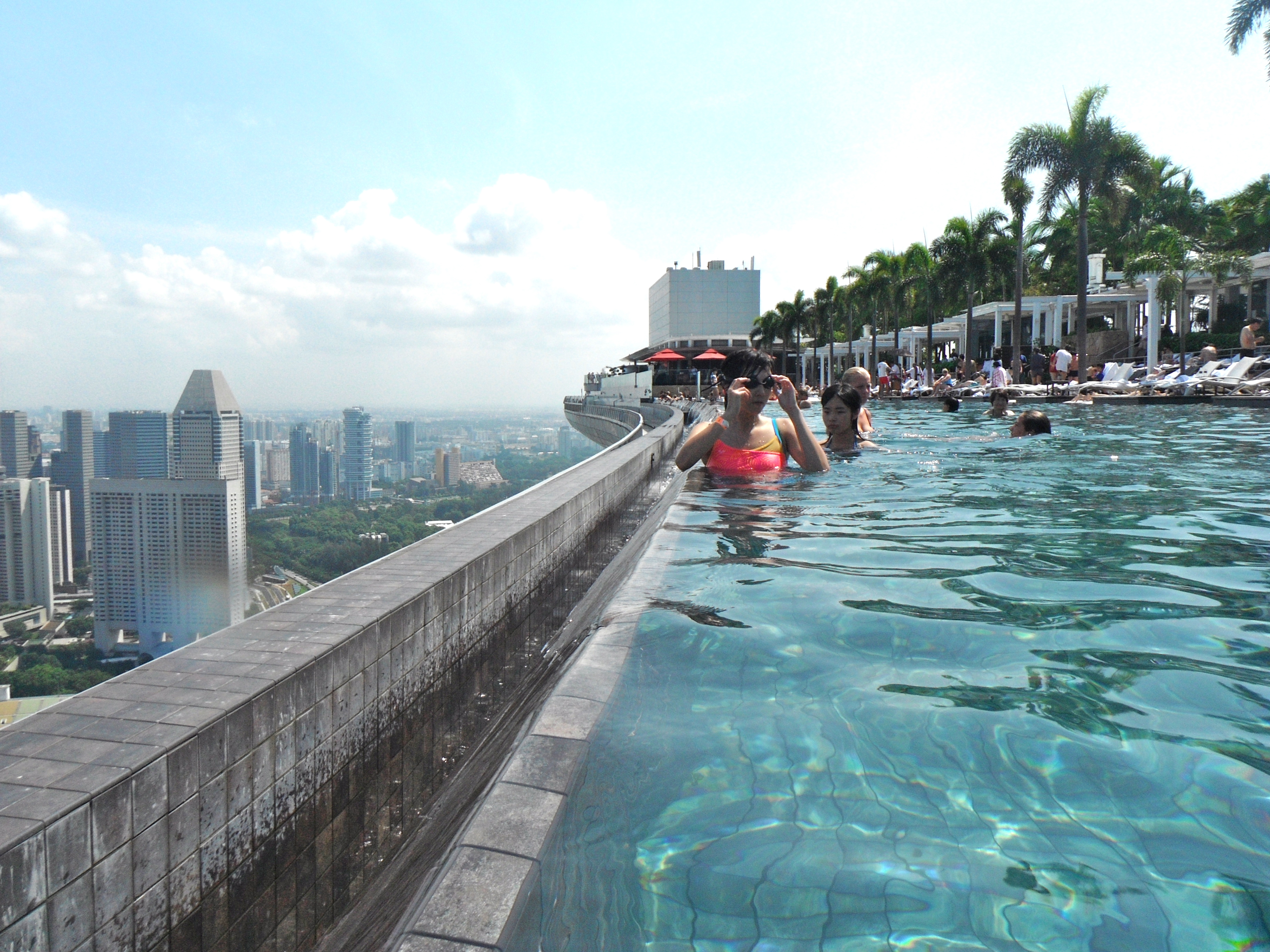
The Marina Bay Sands SkyPark infinity pool in Singapore, viewed from the poolside (top) - demonstrating the 'edgeless' effect - and near the pool's forward edge, showing the structure of the edge used to catch water flowing out of the pool.

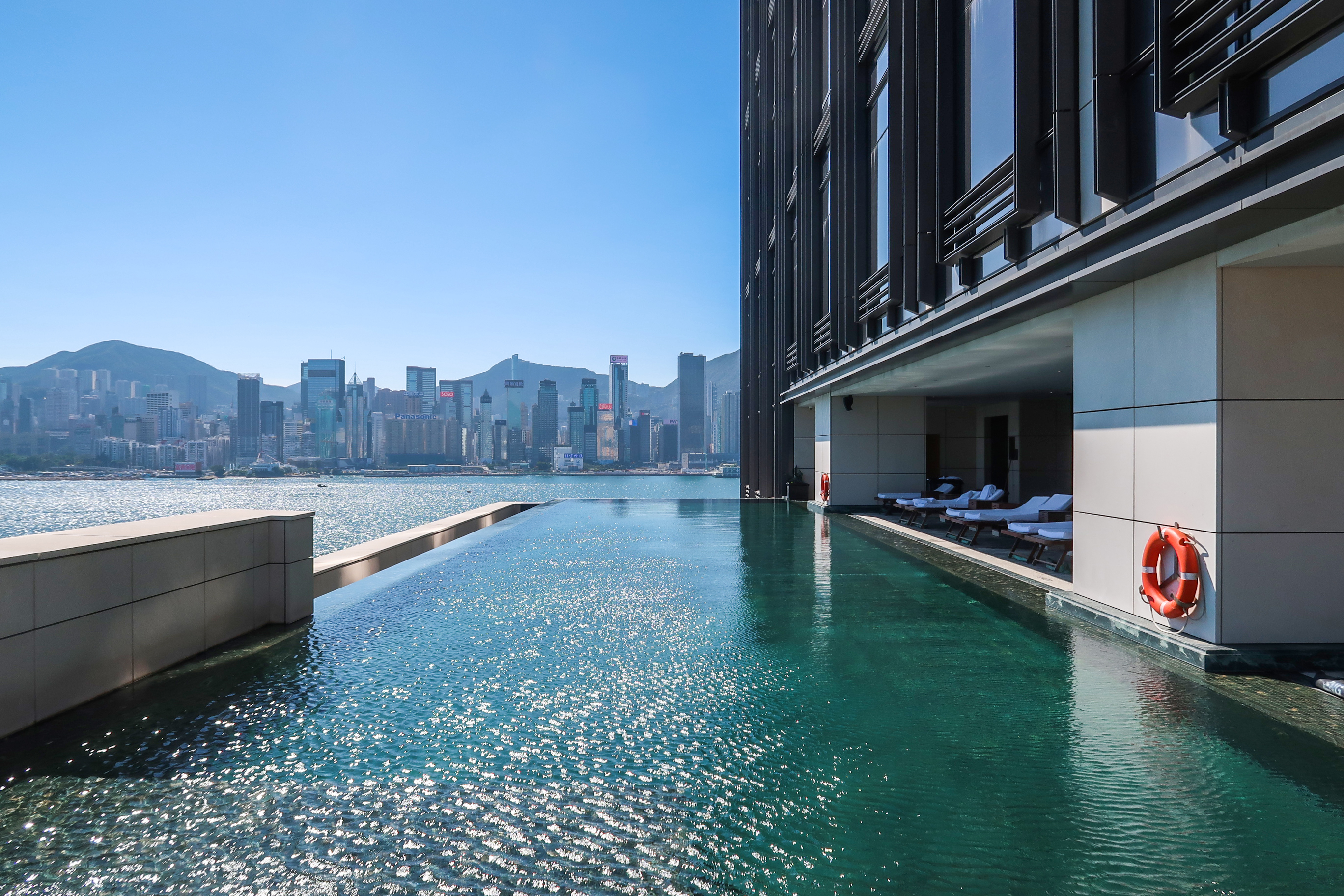
The infinity pool with panoramic views of Victoria Harbour at the Rosewood Hong Kong

An infinity pool (Note: Also called a negative edge pool, vanishing edge pool, infinity edge pool, zero edge pool, overflow pool or spillover pool.) is a reflecting pool or swimming pool where the water flows over one or more edges, producing a visual effect of water with no boundary. Such pools are often designed so that the edge appears to merge with a larger body of water such as the ocean, or with the sky, and may overlook locations such as natural landscapes and cityscapes. They are often seen at hotels, resorts, estates, and in other luxurious places.

== History ==
It has been claimed that the infinity pool concept originated in France, and that one of the first vanishing-edge designs was the Stag Fountain at the Palace of Versailles, built in the late 17th century. In the US, architect John Lautner has been credited as one of the first to come up with an infinity pool design in the early 1960s. He included infinity pools in various residential projects, and also created the vanishing-edge pool in the 1971 James Bond movie Diamonds Are Forever. It was introduced to Australia by the architect Douglas Snelling.

== Structure ==
Infinity pools are expensive and require extensive structural, mechanical, and architectural detailing. Since they are often built in precarious locations, sound structural engineering is paramount. The high cost of these pools often arises from the elaborate foundation systems that anchor them to hillsides.

The "infinite" edge of the pool terminates at a weir that is 1/16 to 1/4 inch (2 to 6 mm) lower than the required pool water level. A trough or catch basin is constructed below the weir. The water spills into the catch basin, from where it is pumped back into the pool.

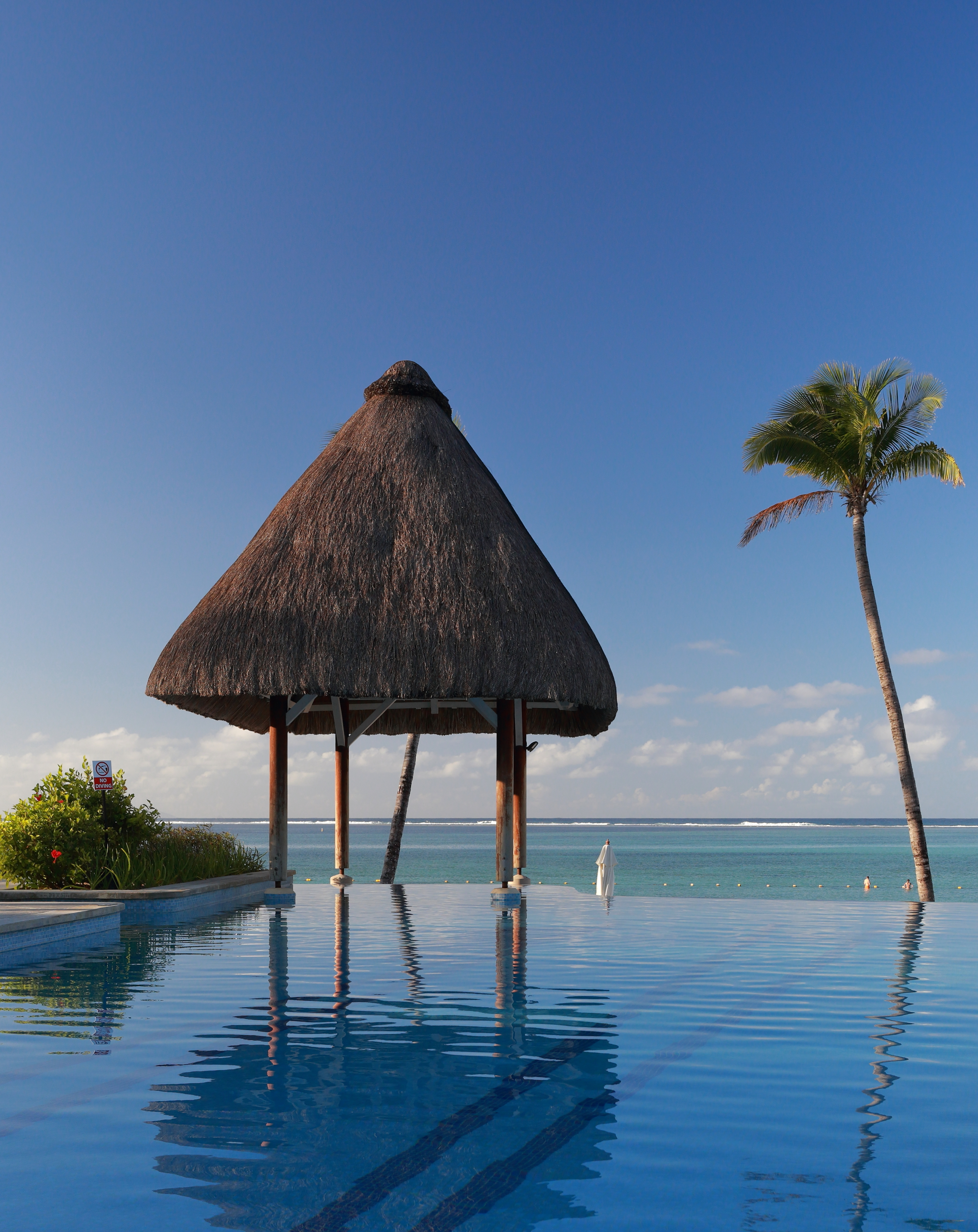
Infinity pool in a resort in Mauritius

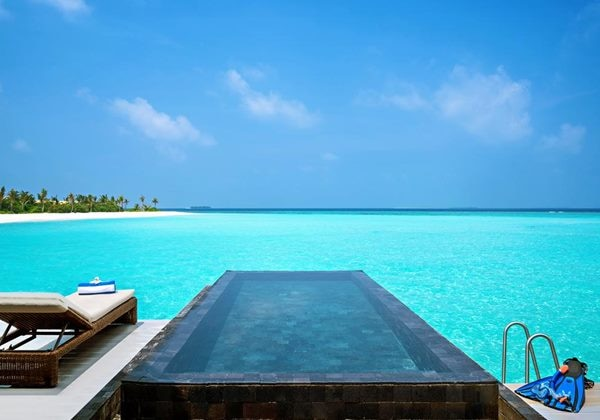
A private infinity pool in a resort in Maldives

== See also ==
- Spa
