= Brit Andresen =

Norwegian-born Australian architect

- Born: 1945 (age 80–81); Trondheim, Norway
- Occupation: Architect
- Children: Anna O'Gorman, Emily O'Gorman
- Awards: RAIA Gold Medal (2002)
- Practice: Andresen O'Gorman Architects
- Buildings: Burrell Museum (1972), Rosebery House (1998), Moreton Bay Houses (2001)

Brit Andresen (born 1945) is a Norwegian-born Australian architect and was the first female recipient of the RAIA Gold Medal, awarded in 2002, for her sustained contribution to architecture through teaching, scholarship and practice.

== Biography ==
Andresen was born in Norway and moved back and forth to Australia where her father, an engineer, was working on hydroelectric projects between 1951 and 1963. She studied architecture at Trondheim in Norway, graduating in 1969. In 1971 she moved to Cambridge, where she began teaching architecture part-time at Cambridge University and established her own practice.

In 1972 Andresen in collaboration with Gasson Meunier Architects, won the design competition for the Burrell Museum, Glasgow. Due to a shortfall in funding, the project was not completed until several years later. The original team, Andresen, Meunier and Gasson had dispersed and the building was completed by Barry Gasson Architects and opened in 1983.

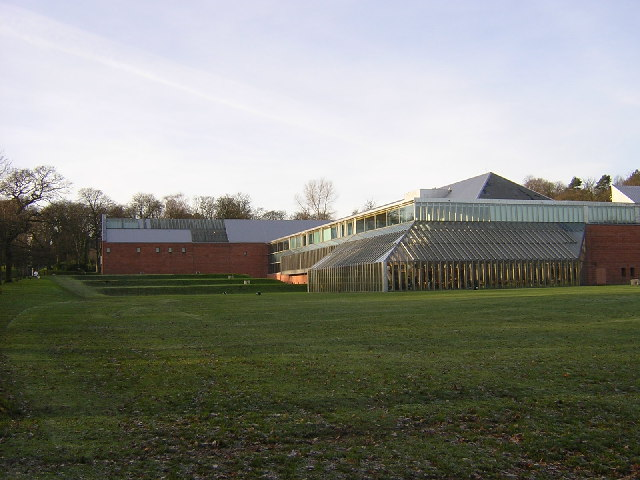
Burrell Collection, Pollok Park, Glasgow - geograph.org.uk - 92250

In 1977 Andresen returned to Australia taking up a temporary teaching position at the University of Queensland, becoming the first female to be appointed in the Department of Architecture. There she met teaching colleague Peter O'Gorman, with whom she married in 1980 and established her current practice Andresen O'Gorman Architects. The predominantly residential practice privileges expressed Australian hardwood timber and the poetics of timber construction. Their work explores the interaction between inside and outside and between people and their environments. Her practices and collaborations in Cambridge and Brisbane have resulted in many built works, which have been published and exhibited both in Australia and internationally, including in the Phaidon Atlas of Contemporary World Architecture.

In addition to the Universities of Cambridge and Queensland, Andresen has held teaching positions at the Architectural Association in London, the School of Architecture and Urban Planning UCLA, Bristol University School of Architecture and a guest lecturing position at The Royal University of Malta.

Between 1993 and 1995 Andreson served as Membership Secretary for the Society of Architectural Historians, Australia & New Zealand.

Andresen has exhibited her scholarship of critical analysis and architectural history widely in conference presentations, journals and books, including her internationally known work on the landscape and site strategies used by Alvar Aalto.

Andersen retired in November 2010 after 33 years contribution to the university and was appointed Emeritus Professor in the School of Architecture. She is also a tutor of the Glenn Murcutt International Masterclass in Sydney.

Most recently, in February 2011, Andresen in collaboration with Sir Peter Cook and Gavin Robotham of Crab Studio, has won the design competition for the new Soheil Abedian School of Architecture at Bond University, Queensland.

== Notable projects ==
- 1972: Burrell Museum (Scotland)
- 1994: Ocean View Farmhouse (Queensland)
- 1998: Mooloomba House (Queensland)
- 1998: Rosebery House (Queensland)
- 2001: Fernberg Pavilion (Queensland)
- 2001: Moreton Bay Houses (Queensland)

== Awards ==
- 1970: Dutch-Norwegian Research Scholarship
- 1990: Teaching Excellence Award, The University of Queensland
- 2002: Fellow Royal Australian Institute of Architects
- 2002: RAIA Gold Medal
