= John Wardle (architect) =

John Wardle is a Melbourne-based architect. He graduated from the Royal Melbourne Institute of Technology with a degree in Architecture.

== Biography ==
John Wardle established his architectural practice John Wardle Architects (JWA) in Melbourne in 1986 and has led the growth of the practice from working on small domestic dwellings to university buildings, museums and large commercial offices. In 2023 the practice was renamed and rebranded as Wardle.

In 2001 he completed a Master of Architecture at RMIT University, and he was adjunct professor at the School of Art, Architecture and Design, University of South Australia (now UniSA Creative, and he is not listed as staff).

Wardle has formed strong links with both artists and public art galleries and, as a practicing architect and board member of both the Anne & Gordon Samstag Museum of Art and the Ian Potter Museum of Art, has contributed to important public art programs.

== Projects ==
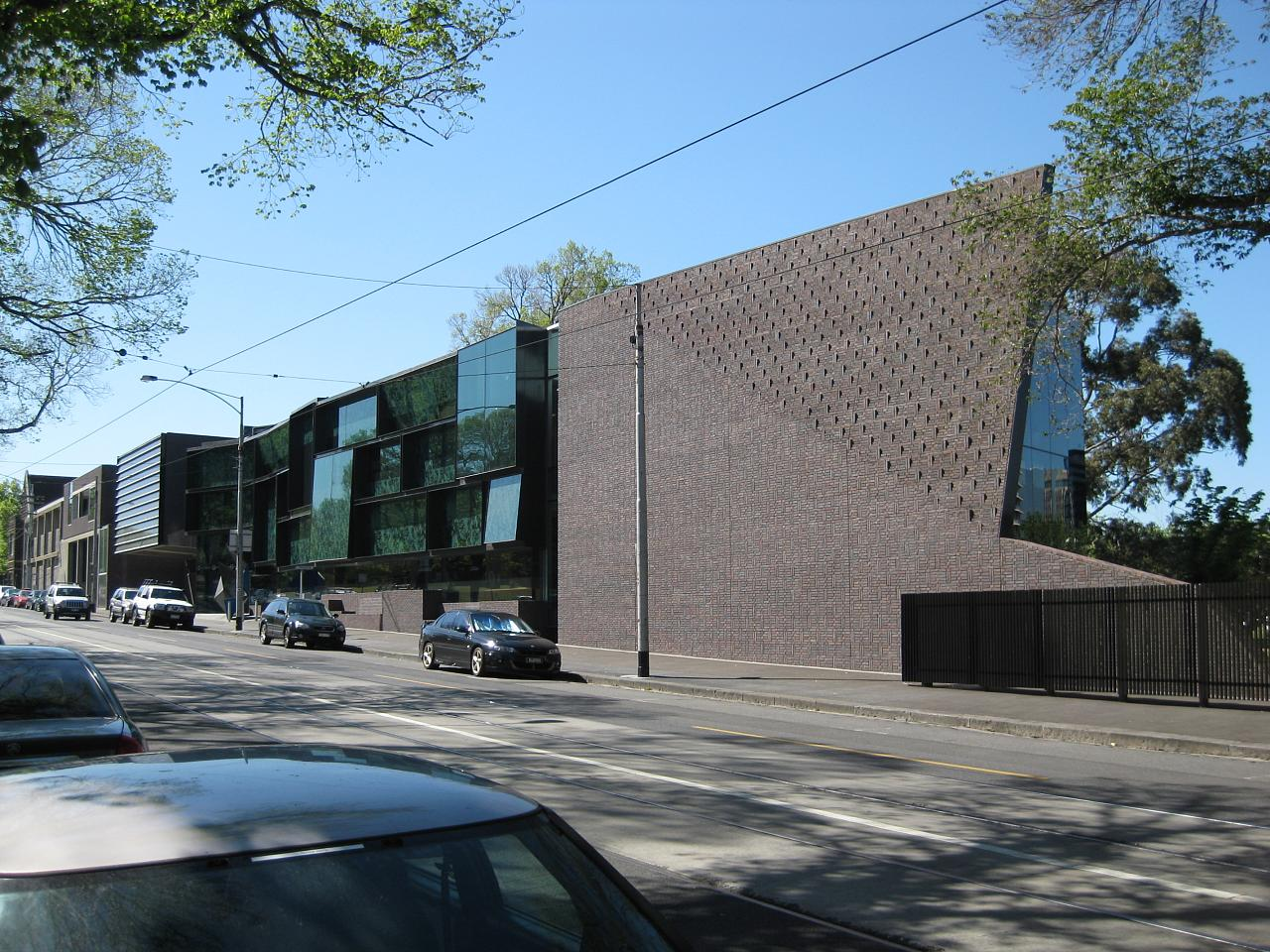
Nigel Peck Centre for Learning and Leadership, Melbourne

Award winning projects by John Wardle Architects include:

- 1997 25 William St. Office, Richmond, Melbourne
- 1999 RMIT Printing Facility, Brunswick Campus, Melbourne
- 2000 Kew Residence, Melbourne
- 2002 RMIT Biosciences Building, Bundoora Campus, Melbourne
- 2006 Uni SA Kaurna Building, Adelaide
- 2008 Nigel Peck Centre for Learning and Leadership, Melbourne
- 2008 Hawke Building, Adelaide
- 2008 Queensland Brain Institute
- 2009 Jane Foss Russell Building, University of Sydney
- 2011 Victoria University Learning Commons and Exercise Sports Science Project
- 2012 Shearer's Quarters, Bruny Island, Tasmania
- 2013 Fairhaven Beach House

== 2018 & 2020: Somewhere Other ==
The 2020 Adelaide//International exhibition at the Samstag Museum centred around an installation called Somewhere Other by John Wardle Architects, in collaboration with Natasha Johns-Messenger. It had also been Australia's entry in the 2018 Venice Architecture Biennale.

Due to run from 28 February to 12 June, the exhibition was cut short by the closure of the Samstag in March 2020 owing to the COVID-19 pandemic in Australia.

== Awards ==
In 2002 and 2006, JWA was awarded the Australian Institute of Architects Sir Zelman Cowen Award for Public Architecture for the most outstanding work of public architecture in Australia. The practice has also been awarded the Harold Desbrowe-Annear Residential Award on three occasions, the Victorian Architecture Medal for a second time in 2008 and the Esmond Dorney Award for Residential Architecture in 2012. In 2012 the Shearers Quarters received the Robin Boyd Award for Residential Architecture. In 2015, John Wardle Architects was the joint award winner of the Inaugural Tapestry Design Prize for Architects for Perspectives on a Flat Surface, along with Kristin Green and Michelle Hamer for their work Long Term Parking. In 2016 JWA was jointly awarded the Melbourne Prize for the Tanderrum Bridge in collaboration with NADAAA. John Wardle was awarded the 2020 Australian Institute of Architects Gold Medal.
