= Peter Stutchbury =

Australian architect (born 1954)

Peter Stutchbury (born 1954, Sydney) is an Australian architect. His architectural expression has been described as "lyrical technologist". In 2015 Stutchbury was awarded the Australian Institute of Architects Gold Medal.

Peter Stutchbury graduated as an architect in 1978 at the University of Newcastle. Stutchbury lived and worked in regional Australia, Africa, Asia and Papua New Guinea, and also visited Europe and America. One of his early buildings was a church in Port Moresby, Papua New Guinea, completed in 1983. He established a joint practice with Phoebe Pape in 1991.

In 2020, Stutchbury co-founded Dimensions X, an adaptable prefabricated home design.

== Projects ==
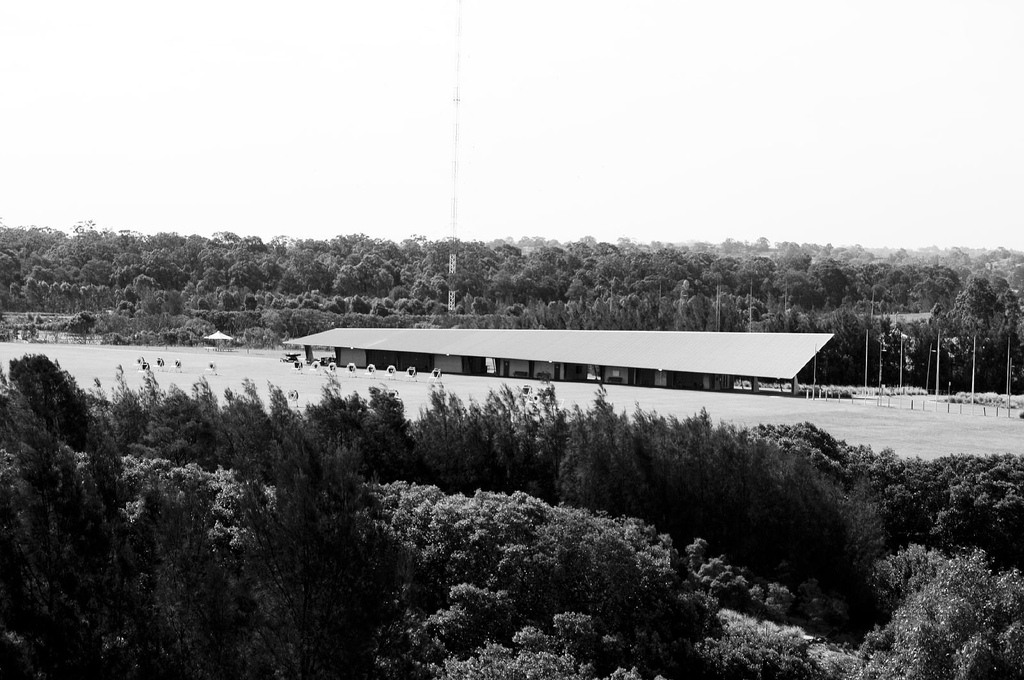
Sydney International Archery Park

- Israel House, Paradise Beach, NSW, 1986–92
- Design Faculty, University of Newcastle, 1994 (with EJE architects)
- Sydney International Archery Park, Homebush Bay, 1998
- Clareville House, NSW, 1999
- Life Sciences Research Link, University of Newcastle, 2001 (with Suters architects)
- Bay House, Watson Bay, NSW: Robin Boyd Award, 2003
- Springwater, Harbord, NSW: Robin Boyd Award, 2005
- Deepwater woolshed, Wagga Wagga, NSW 2005
- Cliff Face House
- Land House
- Cabbage Tree House, 2017
- Joynton Avenue Creative Precinct, Rosebery, NSW: NSW Architecture Medallion, 2018
- Basin Beach House, Mona Vale, NSW: Robin Boyd Award, 2019
- Night Sky, Blackheath, NSW: Robin Boyd Award, 2021
