= Gabriel Poole =

Australian architect (1934–2020)

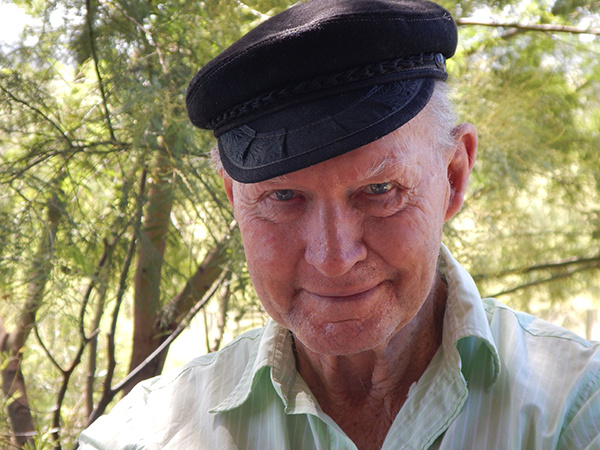
- Gabriel in 2020
- Born: 1934
- Died: 2020 (aged 85–86)
- Education: Central Technical College (Now the Queensland University of Technology) and University of Queensland
- Occupation: Architect
- Known for: Australian architect

Gabriel Poole (1934–2020) was an internationally recognised Australian architect, known for lightweight designs that are site and climate responsive. His ‘Tent House’ in Eumundi won the Royal Australian Institute of Architects (RAIA) Queensland Innovation Award, the Robin Dods Award and the RAIA National Robin Boyd Award in 1991. In 1998 Poole was awarded the nation's highest architectural award, the RAIA Gold Medal, for his lifetime contribution to Australian architecture. He was also an advocate of housing affordability, creating low-cost, pre-fabricated designs.

== Early life and entry into architecture ==
Poole was born in Ipswich in 1934 and was educated at Toowoomba Preparatory School and The Southport School, where he befriended fellow Queensland architectural figure, Geoffrey Pie. Poole was a Queensland Junior Boxing Champion. After leaving school in Grade 10, he worked as a jackaroo in Central Queensland from 1951 to 1955.

Initially keen to study medicine, Poole was persuaded by friends Robin Gibson and John Dalton to pursue architecture, and so in 1957 Poole commenced work as a draftsman with Gibson in Brisbane. During this time, he started architectural studies at the Central Technical College (now the Queensland University of Technology) and completed the design of his first house in Sherwood. He left Brisbane in 1963 to travel to London where he worked for H.T Cadbury Brown, and Powell & Moya.

== Professional career ==
On his return to Brisbane in 1965, Poole continued his studies at the Central Technical College and the University of Queensland, graduating in 1966 with a Diploma in Architecture. He briefly collaborated with Gibson again, and then Conrad Gargett, one of Queensland's oldest architectural firms, before establishing his own practice.

In 1968 he moved his practice to the Sunshine Coast and started designing what was to become his signature style of lightweight and climate-responsive houses. During this time Poole won RAIA awards for Dobie House in Buderim (1972), Schubert House (1972) and Munro House (1975), both in Mooloolaba.

In 1978 he founded Atelier-Two-Design in Noosa in partnership with fellow architect John Mainwaring, which was responsible for the development of 'The Hastings’ prefabricated complex in 1984 in Noosa's Hastings Street; as of 2020, the project still stands.

It was during this period that Poole also developed the ‘Quadropod’ design, a modular steel structure consisting of any number of towers, each of four steel pods anchored into the ground and braced together.

After leaving Atelier-Two-Design in 1985, Poole worked first by himself and then in partnership with his second wife, the interior designer and artist Elizabeth Frith. Together, they began the Gabriel & Elizabeth Poole Design Company. Their Eumundi ‘Tent House’ won the RAIA Queensland Innovation Award, the Robin Dods Award and the RAIA National Robin Boyd award in 1990. The ‘Tent House’ was said to "dramatically redefine what a house could be and caught the public’s imagination in appealing to a sense of freedom through the use of lightweight construction and by reducing dependence on the fixed enclosure." The Finnish architect Elissa Aalto described it as being "like a butterfly in the forest."

The Pooles continued to design houses, including in Sydney for a brief period in the early-mid 1990s, and across all the areas of the Sunshine Coast, including the acclaimed Lake Weyba House in 1996. About his design aesthetic, Poole said: "I am involved in the romance of design—practical and functional but with the potential for an emotional connection. A good building system can help you into a lovely environment and create a space where the soul can play."

In the 1980s, Poole worked on the development of affordable, architect-designed kit homes, producing flat pack prefabrication systems, and self-funding an exhibition project home, the Capricorn 151. Some Capricorn features, such as a lockable central breezeway, were said to be inspired by his years as a jackaroo.

Poole was a mentor to multiple Queensland architects, including RAIA Gold medalists Lindsay and Kerry Clare, Dan Sparks, and Tim Bennetton. Alongside Benetton, the Gabriel & Elizabeth Poole Design Company won the 2018 RAIA Robin Dods Award for Residential Architecture for their Stradbroke House.

== Later years ==
Up until his death, Poole continued working on concepts to facilitate tri-generation living, specifically lower-cost modular-designed homes that catered to aged care. This was due to his belief that Australian architects needed to move towards simple, uplifting spaces which can "accommodate the different generations of a family within a house, providing them with their own privacy and dignity."
