= Kerry and Lindsay Clare =

Australian architects

- Education: Queensland University of Technology
- Occupation: Architect
- Awards: RAIA Gold Medal (2010)
- Practice: Clare Design

Kerry Clare and Lindsay Clare are a wife and husband duo who are Australian architects, founders of Clare Design and joint recipients of the Australian Institute of Architects Gold Medal.

== Professional career ==
Kerry Clare and Lindsay Clare practiced in Queensland from 1979–1998 and New South Wales 1998–present. They have received 40 state and national awards from the Australian Institute of Architects for housing, public, recycling, civic, and commercial projects. Major awards include the national Robin Boyd Award in 1992 and 1995, national RAIA Commercial Award 1995, national Belle/BHP Steel Futures Award 1993 and national RAIA Environment Citation 1996. They also won the Queensland AIA Chapter Robin Dods Award for Residential Architecture, Houses (New) six times between 1982 and 1997.

In 2010, they were joint recipients of the Royal Australian Institute of Architects Gold Medal. The jury citation notes that "Lindsay and Kerry Clare have made an enormous contribution to the advancement of architecture and particularly sustainable architecture, with a strong held belief that good design and sustainable design are intrinsically linked".

They have been members of state, national and international architectural juries, lectured internationally in Graz, Helsinki, Vancouver, Los Angeles, Seattle, Calgary, New York, Bogota, Taiwan, Panama, Barranquilla, Auckland, Sri Lanka, Mexico City, Beijing, and Shanghai and have led winning design teams for a large number of competitions, both nationally and internationally.

Following the inclusion of the McWilliam residence in the Venice Biennale 1991 their Cotton Tree social housing project was selected worldwide for inclusion in the 'Ten Shades of Green' exhibition in New York; an exhibition demonstrating architectural excellence and environmental sensitivity organised by the Architectural League of New York.

The Clares were appointed as Design Directors to the NSW Government Architect from 1998 to 2000 and as Adjunct Professors to the Faculty of Architecture, University of Sydney from 1998 to 2005. They were founding Design Directors of Architectus Sydney (2000 to early 2010). They are now based in Sydney and the Gold Coast. They were appointed Honorary Senior Fellows of the University of the Sunshine Coast in 2004. The Clares were Design Directors for Architectus for notable projects including the Queensland Gallery of Modern Art (National RAIA Award for Public Architecture 2007), the University of the Sunshine Coast Chancellery (AIA State Public Architecture Award and the Harry S Marks Environment Award in 2008), the University of New South Wales student housing (2009), and the Brisbane Wesley House Commercial Building (2009).

Kerry and Lindsay are currently appointed as Professors of the School of Architecture and Built Environment at the University of Newcastle, NSW and as Visiting Professors at the Abedian School of Architecture, Bond University, QLD. Clare Design (with Hayball as Architect of Record) recently completed the Library at The Dock in Melbourne's Docklands for the City of Melbourne, Lend Lease and Places Victoria. The library is the first six star Green Star public building in Australia.

== Notable projects ==
- White Residence, Fig Tree Pocket (QLD)
- Goetz House, Buderim (QLD)
- Kirami, Buderim (QLD)
- Thrupp + Summers, Nambour (QLD)
- McWilliam Residence, Mooloolaba (QLD)
- Rainbow Shores housing, Rainbow Shores (QLD)
- Clare Residence, Buderim (QLD)
- Hammond House, Cooran (QLD)
- Cotton Tree Pilot Housing Project, Cotton Tree (QLD)
- University of Sunshine Coast Recreation Club, Sippy Downs (QLD)
- Refurbishment of Circular Quay wharves (NSW)
- No. 1 Fire Station, Sydney (NSW)
- Queensland Gallery of Modern Art (Architectus), Brisbane (QLD)
- University of Sunshine Coast Chancellery (Architectus), Sippy Downs (QLD)
- University of NSW Student Housing (Architectus), Kensington (NSW)
- Wesley House (Architectus + Fulton Trotter Architects), Brisbane (QLD)
- Library at The Dock, Melbourne (Clare Design with Hayball), Melbourne (VIC)

== Bibliography ==
- Midant, Jean Paul (ed): 1996, "Clare, Lindsay et Kerry", Dictionnaire de l’Architecture du xxe siecle, Hazan, Institut Francais D’Architecture, France, pp 202 –203
- Pearman, Hugh: 1998, "Living" and "Sport", Contemporary World Architecture, Phaidon Press Limited, London, pp 221, 229, 424
- Smith, Robert: 1999, Allgemeines Kunsterlexikon, Germany
- Beck, H & Cooper, J: 2000, ‘Practice Profile: Clare Design’, Architectural Design Vol 70 No 2 * * Space Architecture, John Wiley and Sons Ltd, London, UK, pp 102–108
- Hyatt, P: 2000, ‘Lindsay and Kerry Clare - The Identity of Place’, Local Heroes, Architecture of Australia's Sunshine Coast, Craftsmen House, Sydney, August, pp 6, 18-52, 168-219
- Stungo, N: 2001, The House Book, Phaidon, London, UK, p 78
- Buchanan, P: 2005, Ten Shades of Green: Architecture and the Natural World, Architectural League of New York
- Gossel, P (ed): 2007, ‘Clare, Kerry and Lindsay’ Modern Architecture A-Z, Taschen, Cologne, pp 206–207
- Rihan, X 2008: 100x400 Collections of Famous International Architects, HK RIHAN, Int’l Culture Spread Ltd, Hong Kong. vol. 1, pp 36–43
- Wallace, M & Stutchbury, S: 2008, Place Makers - Contemporary Queensland Architects, Queensland Art Gallery, Australia, pp 118–131
- Beck, H + Cooper, J: 2010, Architectus - Between Order and Opportunity, ORO Editions, California, USA, pp 1–271
- Beck, H + Cooper, J: 2015, Clare Design Works 1980 - 2015, ORO Editions, California, USA pp 1–271
- Goad, P: 2015, Library at The Dock, Architecture Australia, Jan/Feb, pp 92–99
- Goad, P (ed), Willis, J (ed): 2012, The Encyclopaedia of Australian Architecture, Cambridge University Press, New York, USA, pp 41–42, 148-149, 157, 248, 382, 429, 484, 548, 555, 578, 589, 609, 668, 717, 755
- Xu, Y: 2010, 'Creating the Pleasure of Occupation: The Perspective and Practice of the Clares', World Architecture-Contemporary Architecture in Australia, World Architecture Magazine Publication, Tsinghua University, Beijing, China, pp 16, 25-35, 42-47, 138
