= Alexander Tzannes =

Australian architect

Alexander Tzannes AM
- Born: 27 December 1950 (age 75); Sydney, Australia
- Education: University of Sydney
- Occupation: Architect
- Practice: Tzannes Associates

Alexander 'Alec' Tzannes AM (born 27 December 1950) is an Australian architect and academic. He has taught at a number of Australian universities, including at the University of New South Wales as Dean of the university's Faculty of Built Environment from 2008 to 2016. He is also the founding director of Tzannes, a Sydney based architecture and design practice.

== Education ==
Growing up in the suburb of Centennial Park he attended the nearby Sydney Boys High School.

He is a graduate of the University of Sydney, where he completed a Bachelor of Science and a Bachelor of Architecture (winning the University Medal) in 1974, and has a Master of Science (Architecture and Urban Design) from Columbia University (1978).

== Career ==
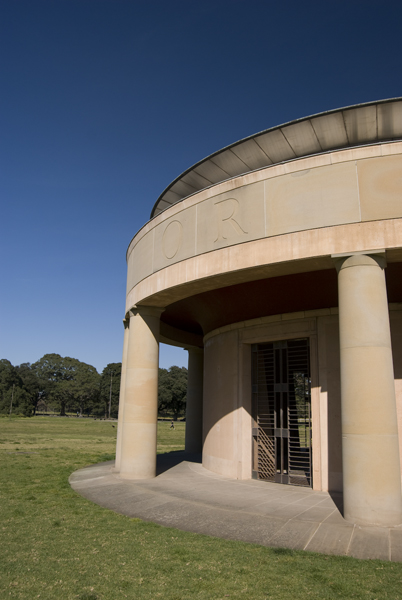
Federation Pavilion, Centennial Park, Sydney

Alexander Tzannes has taught at a number of Australian universities. He was Professor of Design Practice in Built Environment at the University of New South Wales in Sydney, serving as Dean of the university's Faculty of Built Environment from 2008 to 2016, where he is currently Emeritus Professor. He was also a Visiting Professorial Fellow at the Queensland University of Technology in 2003.

Described as "a quintessential Sydney architect in his artful responsiveness to its sense of place" he is also influenced by his commitment to sustainable design and Greek heritage in his design practice. He has designed award-winning houses, apartments and residential complexes, school and educational spaces, commercial office buildings and cultural facilities.

He founded Alexander Tzannes Architects in 1982, which became Lewin Tzannes from 1987-1992 and Tzannes Associates in 1992, trading as Tzannes from 2014 onwards.

Under his direction Tzannes has grown into a leading Australian architecture and design practice, that has won over 200 national, international and state awards. The firm is recognised for their evidence-based creative work across the built environment, including sustainable architecture, master planning, urban design, interiors, and product design.

== Key Projects ==
- Early in his career Alec Tzannes won the design competition for the Federation Pavilion in Sydney's Centennial Park, which was erected in 1988, during the Australian Bicentenary. The site was previously used to mark the Federation of Australia during the official ceremony on 1 January 1901.
- In 1988, one of his early residential designs, Henwood House in inner-city Sydney, won both the prestigious Robin Boyd Award for outstanding Domestic Architecture at the RAIA National Awards and the Wilkinson Award for Residential Architecture in the NSW Awards. In 1989 his Kinsella House and in 1997 his Snelling House also won both awards.
- Some of his other AIA award-winning residential designs include Parsley Bay House (2009 NSW AIA Single Residential Award) and Bilgola Residence (2010 Wilkinson Award for Residential Housing).
- The Point Piper mansion Wingadal, which Tzannes designed for leading Australian businessman John Symond in 2006, is considered to be Australia's most expensive house with a sale price of AU$200 million listed in 2025.
- Notable education projects have included the Junior School and Jo Karaolis Sports Centre redevelopment at St Catherine's School in Waverley (2011). Tzannes' designs for Our Lady of Mercy College Parramatta and the Junior School campus for Cranbook School in Rose Bay both won Public Architecture Awards at the 2014 AIA NSW Awards.
- The 2007 Central Park Masterplan by Tzannes in association with Cox Richardson, led to the redevelopment of the brownfield site of the Kent Brewery (then owned by CUB) in Chippendale into the Central Park precinct.
- In 2016, Tzannes was commissioned by the City of Sydney to design a new range of public domain furniture. The resulting suite of outdoor street furniture and fixtures won multiple design awards including the Good Design Award and the Red Dot Product Design Awards.
- International House Sydney (IHS) completed in 2017 is the first mass-timber construction office building in Australia. Located in the Barangaroo precinct. IHS and the adjoining Daramu House (completed in 2019), also designed by Tzannes, have won a number of Australian and international awards for architecture and sustainability including the 2018 World Architecture Festival award for Best Use of Certified Timber in Commercial Architecture.
- Dangrove, a large-scale art storage facility in the inner-city suburb of Alexandria, was designed by Tzannes to function as an exhibition, screening, and performance space holding the collection of contemporary Chinese art belonging to Judith Neilsen. It has won numerous design awards including the 2019 International Architecture Award for Museum & Cultural Buildings.
- In 2018 a detailed Tzannes report established the urban framework, objectives and design principles for the design of the Martin Place Metro Station, Sydney's first integrated station development. The completion of this award-winning precinct in 2025 "has transformed Sydney’s historic financial heart into a cohesive, vibrant urban experience."
- Tzanne's design for 39 Martin Place, a 28-storey commercial tower above the Martin Place Metro station, was awarded the Sir Arthur G. Stephenson Award For Commercial Architecture at the 2025 NSW Awards of the Australian Institute of Architects.
- Tzannes' design for the adaptive reuse of the historic Kent Brewery in Sydney's Central Park precinct as the Brewery Yards, undertaken by Tzannes, won the 2025 International Architecture Award for Restoration/Renovation.

== Recognition ==
- Alexander Tzannes was the National President of the Australian Institute of Architects from 2007-2008.
- He was made a member of the Order of Australia in 2014 for 'significant service to architecture, as a practitioner and educator, and through professional organisations'.
- In 2017 UNSW honoured Alec Tzannes’ achievements with an honorary Doctor of the University honoris causa.
- In 2018 he was awarded the Australian Institute of Architects Gold Medal.
- In 2019 the Hellenic Union of Eptanisians honoured Tzannes for his academic and architectural work. A stamp was issued in recognition of this honour by the Hellenic Post.
