= Australian Institute of Architects Awards and Prizes =

Annual Australian architecture awards program

The Australian Institute of Architects coordinates and promotes annual awards, prizes and honours at both a national level and at a State and Territory level. Awards generally recognise buildings and projects, whilst prizes recognise individual and group achievement in advocacy, innovation, social, community, education and environmental fields. Honours recognise individual achievements in all areas of architecture.

== National Architecture Awards ==
The National Architecture Awards are held in late October or early November each year and have been presented annually since 1981. Shortlisted entrants are drawn from relevant State and Territory awards programs held earlier in the year (usually in June or July).

National Awards (as of 2025)

- Sir Zelman Cowen Award for Public Architecture (started 1981, named 1981)
- Robin Boyd Award for Residential Architecture, Houses (New) (started 1981, named 1981)
- Lachlan Macquarie Award for Heritage (started 1983)
- National President's Award (started 1985)
- Harry Seidler Award for Commercial Architecture (started 1988, named 2007)
- Emil Sodersten Award for Interior Architecture (started 1988, named 2007)
- Walter Burley Griffin Award for Urban Design (named 1990, preceded by Civic Design Award 1988)
- Jørn Utzon Award for International Architecture (started 1991, named 2007)
- Colorbond Award for Steel Architecture (started 1998)
- David Oppenheim Award for Sustainable Architecture (started 1999 as ESD & EED award, changed to 'Sustainable' in 2002, named 2013)
- National Award for Enduring Architecture (started 2003 as the 25 Year Award, renamed in 2007 and 2011)
- Nicholas Murcutt Award for Small Project Architecture (started 2007, named 2013)
- Frederick Romberg Award for Residential Architecture, Multiple Housing (started 2007, named 2007)
- Eleanor Cullis-Hill Award for Residential Architecture, Houses (Alterations and Additions) (started 2015, named 2015)
- Daryl Jackson Award for Educational Architecture (started 2015, named 2015)
- Australian Award for International Architecture (started 2025)

Discontinued National Awards

- President's Award for Recycled Buildings (started 1985, ended 2000)
- Special Jury Award (started 1991, ended 2002)
- National Education Prize
- Environment Citation (started 1993, ended 1998, replaced by ESD & EED in 1999)
- Access Citation (started 1994, ended 1999)

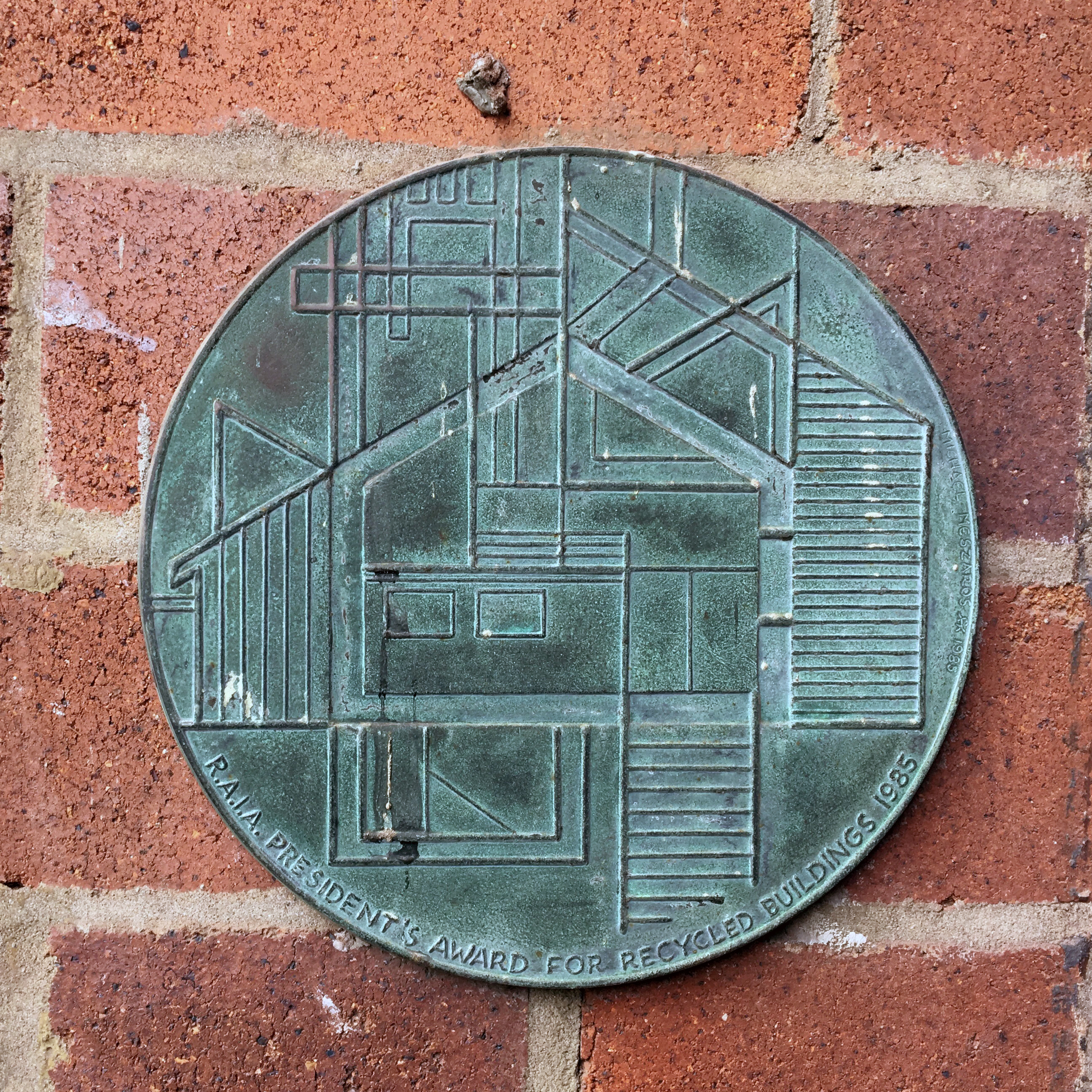
RAIA President's Award for Recycled Buildings 1985, Wharf Theatre, Walsh Bay, Sydney]. Award designed by Michael Meszaros.

== National Prizes ==
National Prizes have been awarded annually since 2010, usually in early May and often as part of the Australian Architecture Conference or Annual General Meeting. Each prize has a separate jury who assess a shortlist in each category. The inaugural 'Australian Achievement in Architecture Awards' were held on 18 March 2010 at the Gallery of Modern Art in Brisbane, presented separately to the National Awards. In 2017 the program was renamed as 'National Prizes'. National Prizes recognise achievement across a range of categories that support and promote advocacy, innovation and education, and do not relate to particular buildings which are judged at the National Awards later in the same year.

=== AIA Gold Medal ===
The AIA Gold Medal is the highest individual honour awarded by the Australian Institute of Architects and has been presented annually since 1960. The honour recognises "distinguished service by architects who have designed or executed buildings of high merit, producing work of great distinction that has advanced architecture or endowed the profession in a distinguished manner". Since 1970 the recipient of the Gold Medal has delivered the AS Hook Memorial Address. The address provides the winner a forum to discuss their work, insights and principles and to reflect on the state of the profession at the time.

The most recent recipient of the Gold Medal is architects Neil Durbach, Camilla Block and David Jaggers of Durbach Block Jaggers, awarded the Gold Medal on 13 May 2026 at the Annual General Meeting of the Australian Institute of Architects. Susan Dugdale from the Northern Territory was announced as the 2027 Gold Medal recipient at the National Architecture Conference in Brisbane on 31 October 2026, bringing the annual annoucement forward by six months.

=== Paula Whitman Leadership in Gender Equity Prize ===
This award honours architect, academic and gender equity advocate Paula Whitman (1960–2006). The Leadership in Gender Equity Prize recognises leadership and outstanding contributions of an AIA member towards the advancement of gender equity in practice, education and governance.

- 2017 Catherine Baudet
- 2018 Melonie Bayl–Smith
- 2019 Helen Lochhead AO
- 2020 Parlour: Gender, Equity, Architecture
- 2021 Suzanne Hunt
- 2022 Fiona Gardiner
- 2023 Emma Williamson
- 2024 Monica Edwards
- 2025 Nicole Kalms
- 2026 Dr Simona Castricum

=== National Emerging Architect Prize ===
The National Emerging Architect Prize "recognises an individual emerging architect or emerging architectural collaboration’s contribution to practice, education, design and community". Emerging architects are considered up to 15 years after graduation or up to 10 years after registration. Since 2016 the National Emerging Architect Prize has been presented at the end of year National Awards.

- 2011 Dr Marcus White (Victoria)
- 2012 Kelly Rattigan (Western Australia)
- 2013 Clare Cousins (Victoria)
- 2014 Andrew Burns (New South Wales)
- 2015 Nic Brunsdon (Western Australia)
- 2016 Amy Muir (Victoria)
- 2017 Anthony Balsamo (South Australia)
- 2018 Christina Cho (Queensland)
- 2018 Monique Woodward (Victoria)
  (Two separate awards presented in 2018)
- 2019 Rodney Eggleston (Victoria)
- 2020 Sarah Lebner (ACT)
- 2021 Dino Vyrnios (South Australia)
- 2022 Daniel Moore (Victoria)
- 2023 Ben Peake (New South Wales)
- 2024 Jennifer McMaster (New South Wales)
- 2025 Dr Kali Marnane (Queensland)
- 2026 Michael Sneyd (Western Australia)

=== National President's Prize ===
The National President's Prize recognises unique individual and group contribution to the advancement of architecture in Australia other than through the design of architecture, practice or architectural education. Contributions may be made over a lifetime or could be a response to a single activity or event. The AIA prizes guideline describe that such contributions could include: "support of the architectural profession; effective advocacy; architectural debate and discourse; community engagement, or any other contribution deemed notable".

- 2011 Janet Holmes à Court AC — Australian commissioner for the Venice Architecture Biennale
- 2012 Lucy Turnbull AO (New South Wales) — advocacy for design, architecture, planning and cities
- 2013 Louise Cox AO (New South Wales) — professional service, policy and advocacy
- 2014 Ross Langdon, posthumous (Tasmania)— humanitarian aid work
- 2015 Sue Harris and Ian Close (Victoria) — architecture media (Architecture Australia magazine)
- 2016 Peter Maddison (Victoria) — design and architecture media, professional development and service
- 2017 Michael Keniger (Queensland) — practitioner, public champion and educator
- 2018 Rob Adams AM (Victoria) — urban design, advocacy and public service, City of Melbourne
- 2019 Tim Ross (New South Wales) — design and architecture media, activism and advocacy
- 2020 Clover Moore AO (New South Wales) — advocacy of high quality architecture, progressive policies and ambitious action on climate change
- 2021 Andrew Mackenzie (Victoria) — architectural writer, curator, editor, publisher, advisor, architecture competition and procurement specialist
- 2022 Khai Liew (South Australia) — furniture design and design consultancy
- 2023 Catherine Townsend, Bruce Townsend, Dominic Pelle and Nathan Judd (ACT) — Contemporary Australian Architects Speaker Series run in Canberra since 1987
- 2024 Naomi Milgrom AC (Victoria) — philanthropy, advocacy and MPavilion program
- 2025 Government Architects Network of Australia (GANA) — Scott Balmforth, Abbie Galvin, Jill Garner, Leah Lang, Kirsteen Mackay, Emma Williamson
- 2026 International engagement via International Union of Architects (UIA) and Commonwealth Association of Architects (CAA) — Richard Kirk, Allen Kong, Justin Hill and Vince Pirrello

In 2025 it was announced that the President's Award was to be changed from awarding an individual or organisation selected by the President for their outstanding contribution to architecture and the built environment, to a new system of categorised awards in three separate areas: Client of the Year, Consultant of the Year, Builder (or Subcontractor) of the Year. Although initially announced, as of October 2026 this approach has not been implemented or announced any further by the AIA.

=== Neville Quarry Architectural Education Prize ===
The Neville Quarry Architectural Education Prize recognises achievement in architectural education in architectural teaching, academic scholarship and research, leadership and community engagement in the higher education sector and other forums. The Prize recognises architect, educator and academic Neville Quarry AM (1933–2004), a long time Professor of Architecture and Faculty Dean at University of Technology, Sydney. Winners receive a prize of $2000, certificate and a medallion.

- 2010 Professor Gordon Holden, Griffith University
- 2011 Associate Professor Anna Rubbo, University of Sydney (Global Studio)
- 2012 Professor Shane Murray, Monash University
- 2013 Professor Peter Corrigan AM, RMIT
- 2014 Professor Miles Lewis AM FAHA , University of Melbourne
- 2015 Professor Paul Memmott AO, University of Queensland
- 2016 Professor Michael Ostwald, University of Newcastle
- 2019 Professor Vivian Mitsogianni, RMIT
- 2021 Associate Professor Conrad Hamann, RMIT
- 2021 Professor John Macarthur, University of Queensland
- 2023 Associate Dean Dr Michael Mossman, University of Sydney
- 2024 Professor Simon Anderson, University of Western Australia
- 2025 No Award
- 2026 Associate Professor Christine Phillips, RMIT

=== Leadership in Sustainability Prize ===
This prize first presented in 2011 recognises individuals, organisations or groups that demonstrate leadership contributing to advances in the environmental sustainability of architecture and the environment.

- 2011 Healthabitat (Paul Pholeros AM, Dr Paul Torzillo AM, Stephan Rainow)
- 2012 Rob Adams AM and the City Design Division (City of Melbourne)
- 2013 Daniel Grollo, Grocon
- 2014 John Macdonald, DesignInc
- 2015 Professor Allan Rodger
- 2016 Jeremy McLeod, Breathe Architecture
- 2019 Cooperative Research Centre for Low Carbon Living (NSW)
- 2021 Caroline Pidcock and Tone Wheeler
- 2022 Dr Kenneth Yeang
- 2023 Dr Iris Se Young Hwang
- 2024 Abbie Galvin and Paulo Macchia, NSW Government Architect
- 2025 David Baggs
- 2026 Dr Elizabeth Brogden

=== Student Prize for the Advancement of Architecture ===
A prize for outstanding contribution by an individual architecture student (SONA member) towards the advancement of architecture in areas of leadership, publication, community or education. This prize has a cash amount of $2,000.

- 2010 Alysia Bennett
- 2011 Daniel Brookes
- 2012 Dr Samuel Jeyaseelan
- 2013 John Byleveld
- 2014 HY William Chan
- 2015 Barnaby Hartford-Davis
- 2016 Peter Nguyen
- 2017 Timothy Randall
- 2018 Troy Borg
- 2019 Bobbie Bayley and Owen Kelly
- 2019 Julius Egan
- 2020 Chantelle Fry
- 2021 Alvin Zhu
- 2022 Thomas Huntingford (joint winner)
- 2022 Isabella Reynolds (joint winner)
- 2023 Blake Hillebrand
- 2024 Hudson Smith
- 2025 Nicole Mesquita-Mendes
- 2026 Amanda Eessa & Mary Anne Yosef

== State and Territory architecture awards and prizes ==
Each of the State and Territory chapters present annual awards and prizes, as listed:

=== Australian Capital Territory (ACT) ===
The ACT Architecture Awards are run annually by the ACT Chapter of the AIA.

==== Awards ====
- Canberra Medallion (highest award, started 1956)
- Sir Roy Grounds Award for Enduring Architecture (started 1995)
- Sir John Overall Award for Urban Design
- Enrico Taglietti Award for Educational Architecture
- JS Murdoch Award for Heritage
- Romaldo Giurgola Award for Public Architecture
- John Andrews Award for Commercial Architecture
- Gene Willsford Award for Residential Architecture, Houses (Alterations and Additions)
- Malcolm Moir and Heather Sutherland Award for Residential Architecture, Houses (New) (named 2009)
- Sydney Ancher Award for Residential Architecture, Multiple Housing (started 2007)
- W Hayward Morris Award for Interior Architecture
- Derek Wrigley Award for Sustainable Architecture
- Cynthia Breheny Award for Small Project Architecture
- Colorbond Award for Steel Architecture
- CS Daley Medal for Residential Architecture^{†} (last award Burrundulla Garden Housing, 1989)

==== Prizes ====
- ACT President's Medal
- Clem Cummings Medal (named 2007) recognises contributions from non-architects and architects to architecture and the public interest
- EMAGN Project Award
- Emerging Architect Prize
- Robert Foster Award for Light in Architecture
- Pamille Berg Awarf for Art in Architecture
- ACT Architecture Professional Practitioner Award
- Missing Middle Prize
- Connection to Country Narrative Prize
- Social Impact Prize
- John Redmond Prize
- Student Medallion
- DJAS Architecture Graduate Prize

† No longer awarded

=== New South Wales ===
The NSW Architecture Awards are run annually by the NSW Chapter of the AIA.

==== Awards ====
- NSW Architecture Medallion (highest award, started 2018)
- Sir John Sulman Medal for Public Architecture (started 1934)
- Wilkinson Award for Residential Architecture, Houses (New) (started 1961)
- Blacket Prize for Regional Architecture (started 1964 as Blacket Award, renamed 1984)
- Lloyd Rees Award for Urban Design (started 1964 as Civic Design Award, named 1979)
- Francis Greenway Award for Heritage (Creative Adaptation/Conservation/Restoration) (started 1975)
- Sir Arthur George Stephenson Award for Commercial Architecture (started 1979)
- Milo Dunphy Award for Sustainable Architecture (started 1996)
- Robert Woodward Award for Small Project Architecture (started 1997)
- New South Wales Enduring Architecture Award (started 2003)
- John Verge Award for Interior Architecture (started 2007)
- Colorbond Award for Steel Architecture (started 2007)
- Aaron Bolot Award for Residential Architecture, Multiple Housing (started 2009)
- Hugh and Eva Buhrich Award for Residential Architecture, Houses (Alterations and Additions) (started 2014)
- William E Kemp Award for Educational Architecture (started 2015)
- EmAGN Project Award

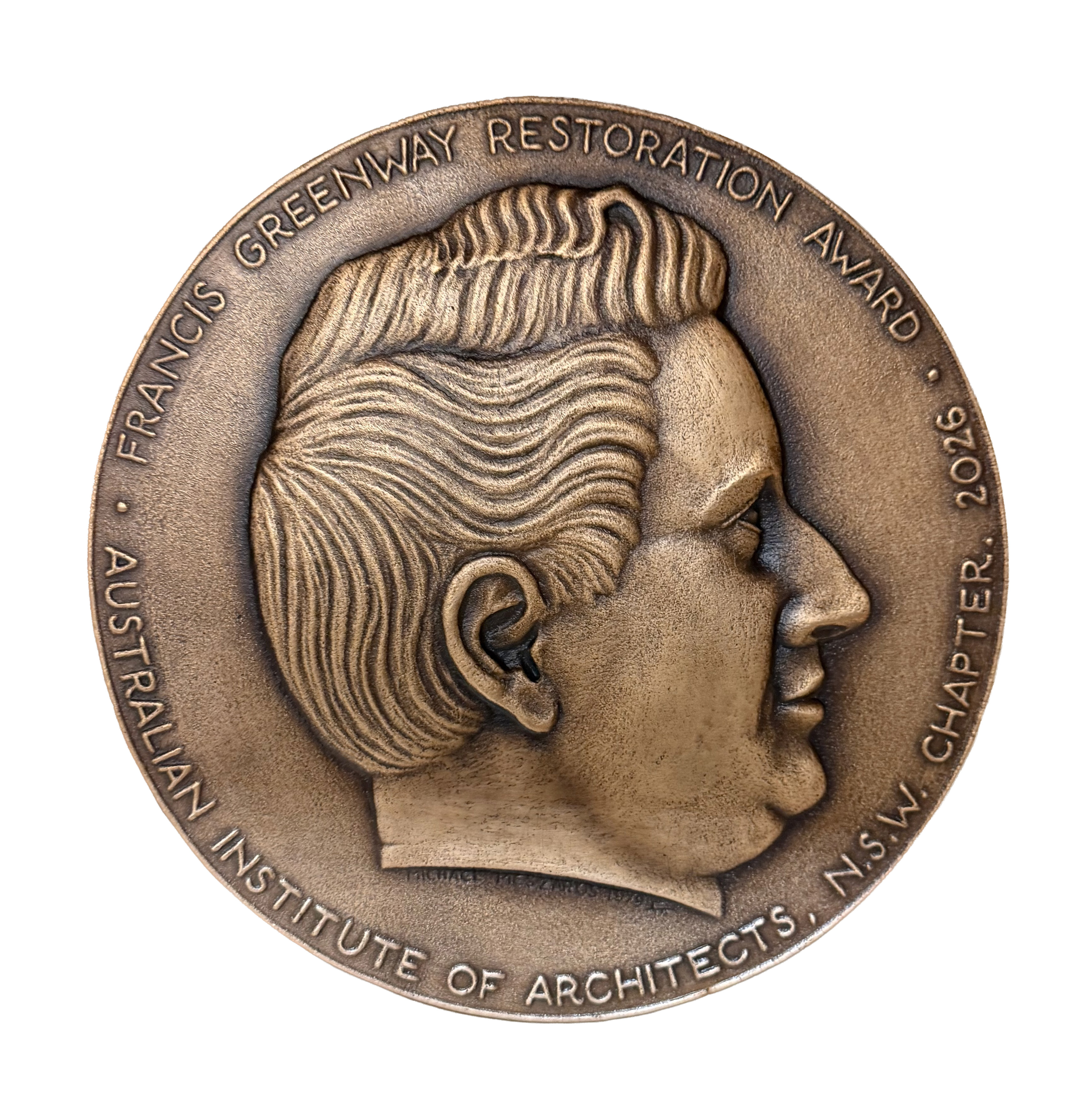
Francis Greenway Restoration Award 2026 for The Lands by Capella, Hassell in collaboration with Purcell Architecture

==== Prizes ====
- NSW President's Prize (started 1984)
- Adrian Ashton Prize (Architectural Culture and Literature, started 1986)
- Premier's Prize (started 1997)
- Marion Mahony Griffin Prize (acknowledges a female in the field of architecture for a distinctive body of work, started 1998)
- Emerging Architect Prize (started 2011)
- Lord Mayor's Prize (started 2013)
- David Lindner Prize (Public Domain and Urban Renewal Research for graduates and emerging architects, started 2013)
- Christopher Procter Prize (Urban Design and City Making Research, started 2019)
- Best in Practice Prize (started 2019)
- Reconciliation Prize (started 2019)

=== Northern Territory ===
The Northern Territory Architecture Awards are run annually by the Northern Territory Chapter of the AIA.

==== Awards ====
- Tracy Memorial Award (highest award, since 1976)
- Peter Dermoudy Award for Commercial Architecture
- Reverend John Flynn Award for Public Architecture
- George Goyder Award for Urban Design (last awarded 2017)
- Peter Fletcher Award for Residential Architecture, Houses (Alterations and Additions)
- Burnett Award for Residential Architecture, Houses (New)
- Ken Frey Award for Residential Architecture, Multiple
- George Chaloupka Award Award for Interior Architecture (last awarded 2017)
- JG Knight Award for Heritage Architecture
- NT Chapter Award for Educational Architecture
- Thorny Devil (Moloch Horridus) Award for Sustainable Architecture (last awarded 2019)
- Yali—McNamara Award for Small Project Architecture (started 2013, last awarded 2019)
- Colorbond Award for Steel Architecture
- Northern Territory Enduring Architecture Award (started 2013)
- Indigenous Community Architecture Award (last awarded 2019)
- EmAGN Project Award
- People's Choice Award

==== Prizes ====
- President's Prize
- President's Award for Recycled Buildings
- Student Prize
- Emerging Architect Prize (last awarded 2018)

Due to the small number of entrants each year, not all categories are awarded in any given year.

=== Queensland ===
The Queensland Architecture Awards are run annually by the Queensland Chapter of the AIA.

- Queensland Medallion (highest award, started 2020)
- Robin Gibson Award for Enduring Architecture (started 2003)
- FDG Stanley Award for Public Architecture
- Jennifer Taylor Award for Educational Architecture
- Robin Dods Award for Residential Architecture, Houses (New)
- Elina Mottram Award for Residential Architecture, Houses (Alterations and Additions)
- Job & Froud Award for Residential Architecture, Multiple Housing
- Beatrice Hutton Award for Commercial Architecture
- Hayes & Scott Award for Small Project Architecture
- GHM Addison Award for Interior Architecture
- Don Roderick Award for Heritage
- Harry Marks Award for Sustainable Architecture
- Karl Langer Award for Urban Design
- Regional Project of the Year

==== Prizes ====
- QIA Medallion (academic award started 1948)
- Emerging Architect Prize
- Art and Architecture Prize
- EmAGN Project Award
- Queensland People's Choice Award
- Social Impact Prize
- People's Choice
- Robin Dods Triennial Medal^{†}

† No longer awarded

=== South Australia ===
The South Australian Architecture Awards are run annually by the South Australia Chapter of the AIA. As of 2026 these awards include:

- South Australia Architecture Medal (highest award, started 2021)
- Jack Cheesman Award for Enduring Architecture (started 2005)
- Jack McConnell Award for Public Architecture
- Gavin Walkley Award for Urban Design (Note: See info about Gavin Walkley here:)
- Keith Neighbour Award for Commercial Architecture
- Robert Dickson Award for Interior Architecture
- Dr John Mayfield Award for Educational Architecture
- Award for Residential Architecture, Multiple Housing
- John S Chappel Award for Residential Architecture, Houses (New)
- John Schenk Award for Residential Architecture, Houses (Alterations and additions)
- Derrick Kendrick Award for Sustainable Architecture
- Award for Small Project Architecture
- David Saunders Award for Heritage Architecture (Note: David Arthur Lewis Saunders)
- Colorbond Award for Steel Architecture

==== Prizes ====
- City of Adelaide Prize for Design Excellence
- City of Adelaide Prize for Design Excellence People's Choice
- EmAGN Project Award
- Creative Collaboration Prize

=== Tasmania ===
The Tasmania Architecture Awards are run annually by the Tasmania Chapter of the AIA.

- Tasmanian Architecture Medal
- Tasmania Award for Enduring Architecture (started 2010)
- Colin Philip Award for Commercial Architecture
- Sydney Blythe Award for Educational Architecture
- Barry McNeill Award for Sustainable Architecture
- Roy Sharrington Smith Award for Heritage
- Alexander North Award for Interior Architecture
- Peter Willmott Award for Small Project Architecture
- Alan C Walker Award for Public Architecture (started 2013)
- Esmond Dorney Award for Residential Architecture, Houses (New) (started 2017)
- Dirk Bolt Award for Urban Design (started 2019)
- Ray Heffernan Award for Residential Architecture, Multiple Housing (started 2022)
- Edith Emery Award for Residential Architecture, Houses (Alterations and additions)
- Colorbond Award for Steel Architecture
- EmAGN Project Award

==== Triennial Prizes ====
- James Blackburn Triennial Prize (residential categories)
- John Lee Archer Triennial Prize (public, commercial, educational architecture, and urban design categories)
- Henry Hunter Triennial Prize (heritage, interior architecture, and small project categories)

==== Prizes ====
- Sydney Wallace Thomas Blythe Student Prize
- Emerging Architect Prize
- Barry McNeill Graduate Prize

=== Victoria ===
The Victorian Architecture Awards are run annually by the Victoria Chapter of the AIA.

==== Awards ====
- Victorian Architecture Medal (highest award, started 1929)
- William Wardell Award for Public Architecture (named 1996)
- Public Architecture Award (Alterations and Additions)
- Harold Desbrowe-Annear Award for Residential Architecture, Houses (New) (started 1996)
- Sir Osborn McCutcheon Award for Commercial Architecture (started 1997)
- Dimity Reed Melbourne Prize (started 1997, named 2023)
- Joseph Reed Award for Urban Design (started 1997)
- Regional Prize (started 2001)
- Maggie Edmond Enduring Architecture Award (started 2003, named 2023)
- John George Knight Award for Heritage Architecture (started 2005)
- Marion Mahony Award for Interior Architecture (started 2006)
- Best Overend Award for Residential Architecture, Multiple Housing (started 2007)
- Henry Bastow Award for Educational Architecture (started 2015)
- John and Phyllis Murphy Award for Residential Architecture, Houses (Alterations and Additions)
- Kevin Borland Award for Small Project Architecture
- Allan and Beth Coldicutt Award for Sustainable Architecture
- Colorbond Award for Steel Architecture

==== Prizes ====
- President's Prize (started 2000)
- Bates Smart Award for Architecture in the Media (National, State and Advocacy Prizes)
- Emerging Architect Prize
- EmAGN Project Award
- Victorian Student Ideas Prize
- Victorian Graduate Prize
- Robert Caulfield Graduate Research Scholarship
- Sinclair—Nelson Drawing Scholarship

=== Western Australia ===
The West Australian Architecture Awards are run annually by the West Australia Chapter of the AIA.

- George Temple-Poole Award (highest award)
- Jeffrey Howlett Award for Public Architecture
- John Septimus Roe Award for Urban Design
- Hillson Beasley Award for Educational Architecture
- Richard Roach Jewell Award for Enduring Architecture (started 2015)
- Marshall Clifton Award for Residential Architecture, Houses (New)
- Peter Overman Award for Residential Architecture, Houses (Alterations and Additions)
- Harold Krantz Award for Residential Architecture, Multiple Housing
- Ross Chisholm and Gil Nicol Award for Commercial Architecture
- Julius Elischer Award for Interior Architecture
- Heritage Architecture Award
- Iwan Iwanoff Award for Small Project Architecture
- Wallace Greenham Award for Sustainable Architecture
- Colorbond Award for Steel Architecture

==== Prizes ====
- Brian Kidd Enabling Architecture Prize
- Mondoluce Lighting Award
- EmAGN Project Award
- Emerging Architect Prize
- Bronze Medal/Architecture Medal^{†}

† No longer awarded

== Regional architecture awards and prizes ==
Separately judged awards occur in regional New South Wales and Queensland.

=== NSW Regional Architecture Awards ===
The New South Wales Regional Architecture Awards were established in 2025 with the merging of the NSW Country Division Awards and the Newcastle Architecture Awards, and provide a pathway to state and national awards. The awards are assessed by three subregional juries of three members each; North Division, Central Division and South Division. The first combined awards presentation was held in Coffs Harbour on 13 February 2026.

The following award categories are considered for projects located outside Greater Sydney:

- Regional Medallion (highest award)
- President’s Prize for Services to Regional Architecture
- Commercial Architecture
- Educational Architecture
- Heritage
- Interior Architecture
- People's Choice Awards (North, Central, South Divisions)
- Public Architecture
- Residential Architecture – Houses (Alterations & Additions)
- Residential Architecture – Houses (New)
- Residential Architecture – Multiple Housing
- Small Project Architecture
- Sustainable Architecture
- Timber Award
- Urban Design

==== Division Awards ====
- James Barnet Award (North Division)
- David Boyle Award (Central Division)
- Florence Mary Taylor Award (South Division)

=== Newcastle Architecture Awards ===
The Newcastle Architecture Awards covered the NSW Central Coast, Hunter Valley and Newcastle areas and occurred each November. They were administered by the AIA NSW Chapter Regional Committee. In 2025 the awards were replaced by New South Wales Regional Architecture Awards.

- Newcastle Architecture Medal (highest award)
- Commercial Architecture Award
- Interior Architecture Award
- Award for Residential Architecture, Alterations and Additions
- Award for Residential Architecture, Houses (New)
- Award for Residential Architecture, Multiple Housing
- Small Project Architecture Award
- Award for Sustainable Architecture
- Colorbond Award for Steel Architecture

=== New South Wales Country Division Awards ===
The NSW Country Division Awards were held each November and were administered by the AIA NSW Chapter Regional Committee. In 2025 the awards were replaced by New South Wales Regional Architecture Awards.

- James Barnet Award (highest award)
- Regional Division Medal
- Award for Public Architecture
- Award for Urban Design
- Vision Award
- Timber Award
- Commercial Architecture Award
- Award for Residential Architecture, Alterations and Additions
- Award for Residential Architecture, Houses (New)
- Award for Residential Architecture, Houses (Affordable housing under $400,000)
- Award for Residential Architecture, Multiple Housing
- Award for Interior Architecture
- Small Project Architecture Award
- Award for Sustainable Architecture
- Colorbond Award for Steel Architecture
- NSW President's Regional Prize

=== Greater Brisbane Regional Awards ===
Greater Brisbane Regional Architecture Awards are awarded in April/May of each year.

- John Dalton Award for Building of the Year
- Regional Project of the Year
- Greater Brisbane House of the Year
- Greater Brisbane People's Choice Award
- Residential Architecture, Houses (New)
- Residential Architecture, Houses (Alterations and additions)
- Residential Architecture, Multiple Housing
- Public Architecture
- Interior Architecture
- Educational Architecture
- Lord Mayor's 'Brisbane Buildings That Breathe' Architecture Prize

Commendations also awarded in Commercial Architecture, Heritage Architecture, Sustainable Architecture, Small Architecture and Urban Design.

=== Central Queensland ===
Central Queensland Regional Architecture Awards are awarded in May of each year.

- JW Wilson Award for Building of the Year
- Regional Project of the Year
- House of the Year
- Award for Public Architecture
- Residential Architecture, Houses (New)
- Award for Commercial Architecture
- Small Project Architecture Award
- People's Choice Award

=== Far North Queensland Regional Awards ===
- Eddie Oribin Award for Building of the Year
- Regional Project of the Year
- People's Choice Award
- Residential Architecture (Multiple Housing)
- Educational Architecture
- Public Architecture

=== North Queensland Regional Awards ===
- Walter and Oliver Tunbridge Award for Building of the Year
- Regional Project of the Year Award
- People's Choice Award
- Residential Architecture (Multiple Housing)
- Educational Architecture
- Public Architecture

=== Darling Downs and West Moreton Regional Awards ===
- William Hodgen Award for Building of the Year
- Regional Project of the Year
- House of the Year
- People's Choice Award
- Public Architecture
- Educational Architecture
- Heritage
- Residential Architecture — Houses (New)

=== Sunshine Coast Regional Awards ===
- Gabriel Poole Award for Building of the Year
- Regional Project of the Year
- House of the Year
- People’s Choice Award
- Regional Commendations

=== Gold Coast/Northern Rivers Region ===
- Philip Follent Building of the Year
- Regional Project of the Year
- People's Choice Award
- Residential Architecture (Multiple Housing)
- Educational Architecture
- Public Architecture

== International Chapter awards and prizes ==
Separate International Chapter awards commenced in 2012 with three categories. The Jørn Utzon Award for International Architecture is awarded at the National Architecture Awards.

- International Chapter Architecture Medallion (started 2022, not awarded 2023 or 2024)
- International Chapter Award for Commercial Architecture
- Hugh O’Neill Award for Heritage
- Louise Cox Award for Public Architecture (named in 2024)
- International Chapter Award for Educational Architecture
- International Chapter Award for Interior Architecture
- International Chapter Award for Urban Design
- International Chapter Award for Residential Architecture, Multiple Housing
- International Chapter Award for Residential Architecture, Houses (New)
- International Chapter Award for Residential Architecture, Houses (Alterations and Additions)
- International Chapter Award for Small Project Architecture
- International Chapter Award for Heritage
- William J. Mitchell Prize (started 2012 and awarded biennially since 2016)
- People's Choice Award
- Emerging Architect Prize

=== William J Mitchell International Chapter Prize ===
The William J. Mitchell Prize recognises significant contribution by an Australian to architecture internationally. The prize was established to acknowledge those who have made a significant contribution to the international arena of architecture, and may or may not be an architect. The prize was named for architect Bill Mitchell for his core values of diversity and collaboration. From the awards handbook "recipients of this prize are to have an Australian connection, either by being an Australian or having an Australian education, and has made a significant contribution to the international advancement of architecture through practice, education, discourse, photography, etc". The prize is nominated and judged by International Chapter Council, and has been awarded biennially since 2016.

- 2012 John Andrews AO
- 2013 John Gollings AM
- 2014 Haig Beck & Jackie Cooper
- 2015 Louise Cox AO
- 2016 Brian Burr
- 2018 Dr Liu Thai Ker
- 2020 Antonia Syme AM
- 2022 Felicity D. Scott
- 2024 Mark Burry AO
- 2026 Robert Nation

== Other awards and prizes ==
Since 2001 the Australian Institute of Architects has been a co–convenor of the Australian Urban Design Awards with the Planning Institute of Australia and Australian Institute of Landscape Architects.

== See also ==
- Sir Zelman Cowen Award for Public Architecture
- Australian Institute of Architects
- Australian Institute of Architects Gold Medal
- Robin Boyd Award
- Victorian Architecture Awards
- Victorian Architecture Medal
- Wilkinson Award
- Sir John Sulman Medal
