= Barry Bergdoll =

American art historian

Academic background
- Education: Columbia University (BA, PhD); University of Cambridge

Academic work
- Discipline: Architectural history
- Institutions: Columbia University

Barry Bergdoll is Meyer Schapiro Professor of art history in the Department of Art History and Archaeology at Columbia University and from 2007 to 2019 a curator in the Department of Architecture and Design at the Museum of Modern Art, New York, where from 2007 to 2013 he served as Philip Johnson Chief Curator of Architecture and Design. He serves, since 2018, as President of the Board of the Center for Architecture in New York City and a member of the Pritzker Architecture Prize jury since 2019.

== Education ==
Bergdoll graduated from Columbia University in 1977 and studied at King's College, Cambridge, on a Kellett Fellowship (1977–79) before returning to Columbia to complete his Ph.D. in 1986.

== Academic career ==
Bergdoll's chief interest is architectural history, particularly that of France and Germany since 1750. He studies architecture from an art historical approach, however, tying it to history, sociology, and culture. He has studied cultural representation in architecture, the evolution of architecture as a profession, and the intersections between artistic genres such as architecture and film. He has also worked on the problems of museological exhibitions of architecture. Prior to joining MoMA, Bergdoll was the chair of the Department of Art History at Columbia. In 1993, he received a grant from the Graham Foundation for study on the impact of the fall of Communism on architectural teachings in Eastern Europe.

== Curation ==
As a curator, Bergdoll has participated in several major architectural exhibitions, including "Mies in Berlin", shown in New York, Barcelona, and Berlin (2001–03); "Le Panthéon: Symbole des Révolutions" shown in Montreal and Paris in 1989, and "Les Vaudoyers: une dynastie d'architectes" at the Musée d'Orsay in Paris in 1992. On January 1, 2007, Bergdoll succeeded Terence Riley as Chief Curator for Architecture and Design at MoMA. Among the exhibitions he has curated at MoMA since joining in January 2007 are "Lost Vanguard" (2007); "Home Delivery: Fabricating the Modern Dwelling," (2008) which included five full scale prefabricated or digitally fabricated houses on the vacant lot next to the museum; "Bauhaus" (2009) with Leah Dickerman; "Rising Currents: Projects for New York's Waterfront" (2010); and "Foreclosed: Rehousing the American Dream" (2012) with Reinhold Martin. The exhibition "Labrouste: La Structure Mise en Lumiere" co-curated with Corine Belier of the Cite de l'Architecture et du Patrimoine and Marc LeCoeur of the Bibliothèque Nationale was shown in Paris (2012–13) and presented at the Museum of Modern Art in Spring 2013, followed by "Le Corbusier: An Atlas of Modern Landscapes," organized with Jean-Louis Cohen. In 2012 Bergdoll was instrumental in bringing the Frank Lloyd Wright Foundation archives to MoMA and Columbia; in 2014 he organized a first exhibition based on that archive: "Frank Lloyd Wright and the City," followed by a major exhibition in 2017, "Frank Lloyd Wright at 150: Unpacking the Archive."

== Recent works ==
- Bauhaus 1919–1933: Workshops for Modernity (2009-2010)
- Mies in Berlin (2001)
- European Architecture 1750–1890 (2000)
- Léon Vaudoyer: Historicism in the Age of Industry (1994)
- Karl Friedrich Schinkel: An Architecture for Prussia (1994)
