= Adelaide University Union redevelopment =

University building in Adelaide, Australia

Coordinates: 34.9185°S 138.6036°E

The Adelaide University Union redevelopment (1967–1975), also known as the Union Building Group, is one of the most significant buildings in the University of Adelaide complex. It incorporates the existing buildings known as Union Buildings, Lady Symon Building, the George Murray Building, the Cloisters, and the Western Annexe, and created the new Union House.

== Background ==
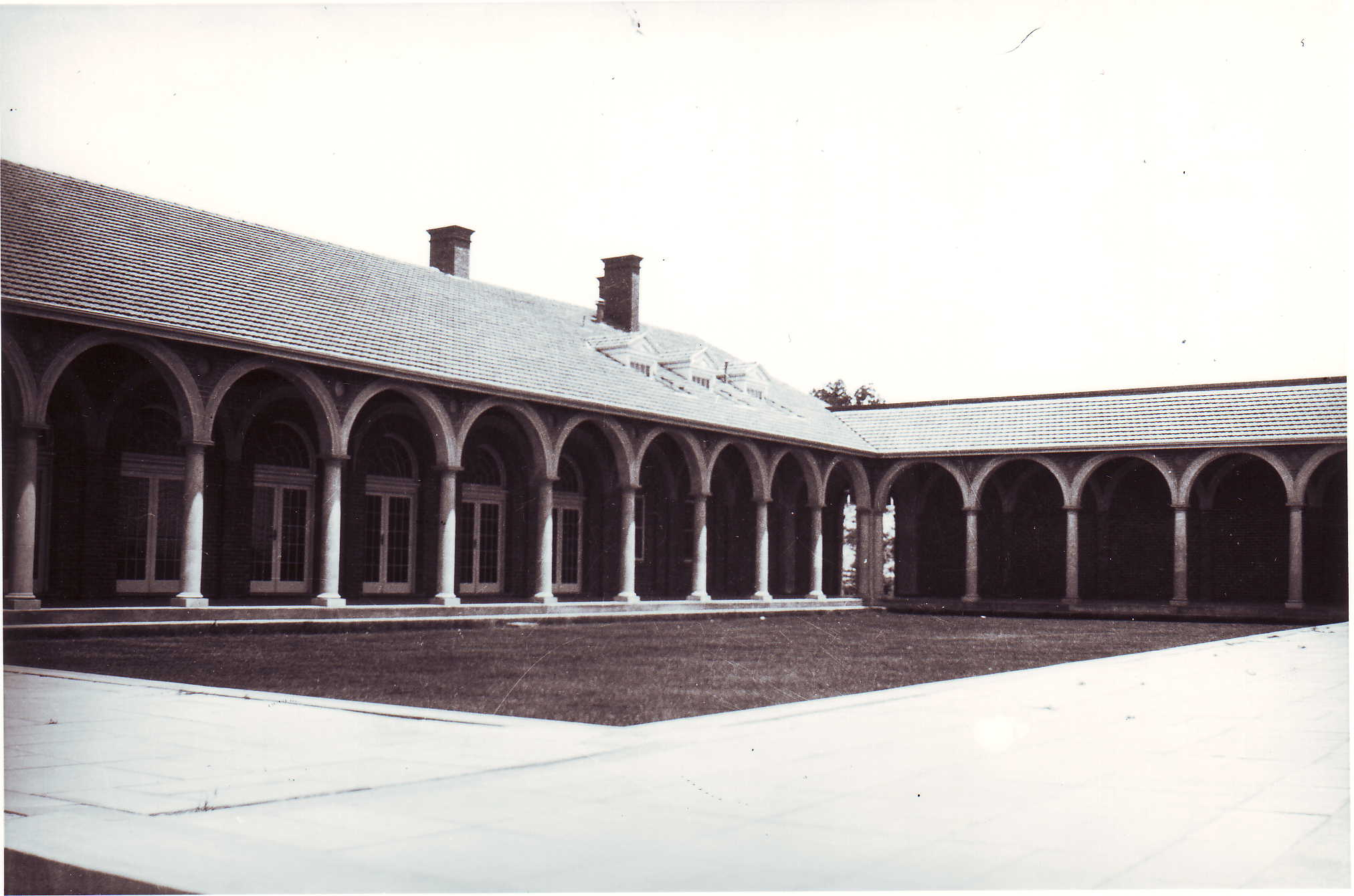
Union Building before redevelopment, 1930

The architectural practice Dickson & Platten were commissioned by both the Adelaide University Union and University of Adelaide to redesign the site that included existing buildings. The Union council presented the problem that the existing university accommodation needed to be redesigned within the confines of the existing built-up site, and the facilities were to be kept in operation during redevelopment. The design concept was to be low-rise to allow for easy movement on foot, provide important and attractive circulation spaces encouraging intercommunication.

The complex includes the Union Buildings include the Lady Symon Building (named after the wife of Sir Josiah Symon), the George Murray Building (named after George John Robert Murray, vice-chancellor and later chancellor of the university), the Cloisters, Union House and the Western Annexe. This meant including a diversity of functions, including a bookshop, shops, refectories, a cinema, theatre, gallery, and offices, while encompassing a large five-level red brick and concrete building with exposed brickwork and timber detailing.

The earlier Georgian-style buildings, including the Cloisters, the Lady Symon Building and the George Murray building, were designed by the architects Woods, Bagot, Jory and Laybourne-Smith (who also designed several other university buildings) in 1929 and 1937.

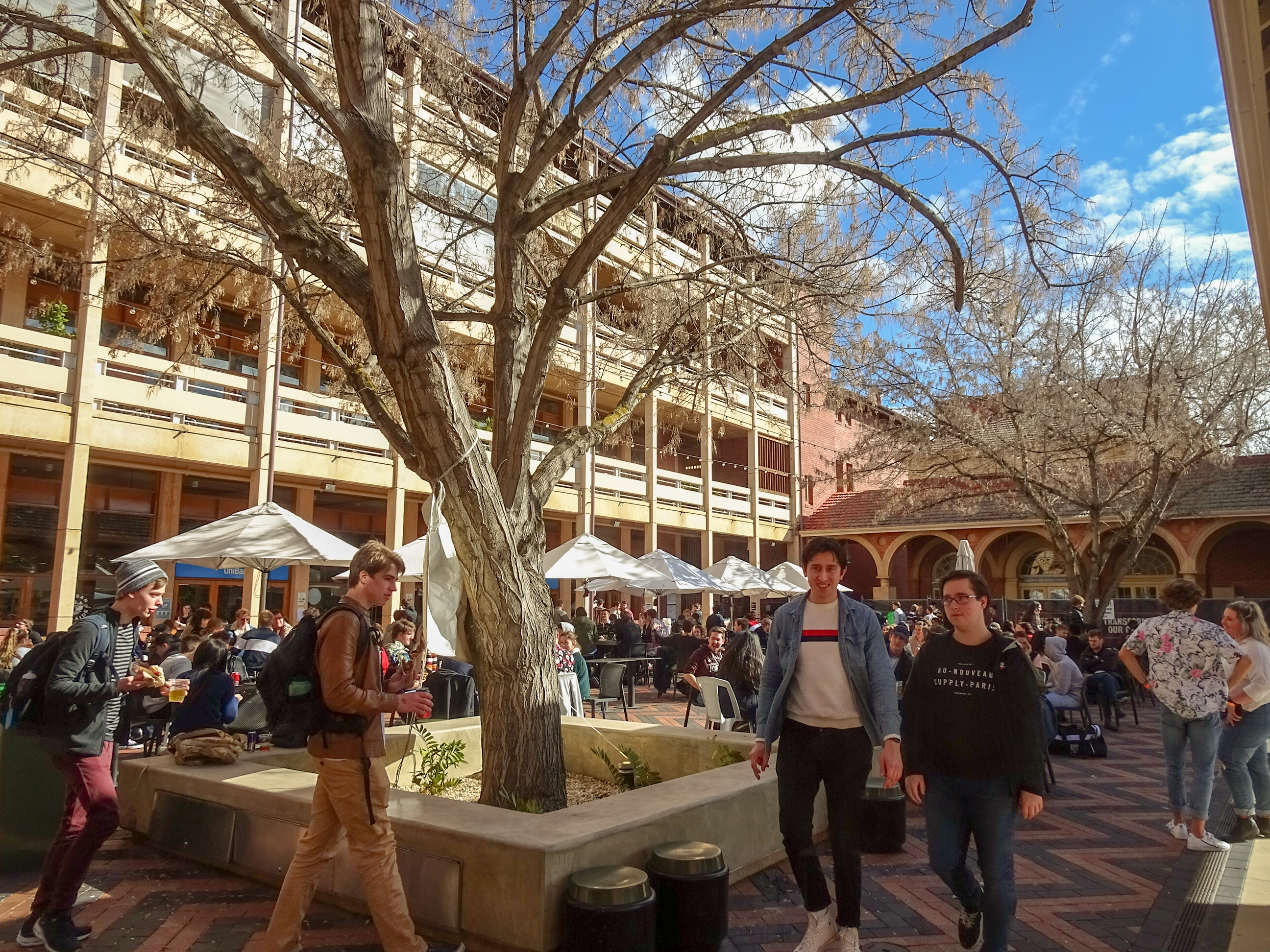
Student Union Building courtyard

== The building ==
The redevelopment was completed in stages from 1967 to 1975. Robert Dickson led the project, during which the practice name changed to Robert Dickson & Associates from 1973.

It has several entrances, balconies and terraces connecting it to the multiple levels of the university site, while many aspects of the design and materiality match those of the historic university context, including works by architects Walter Bagot and Louis Laybourne-Smith.

== Awards ==
The redevelopment received an Award of Merit from the RAIA in 1974 and a Civic Trust Award in 1975. (Note: Not to be confused with the British Civic Trust Awards: "The Adelaide-based Australian Civic Trust, formerly known as the Civic Trust of South Australia, was established in the wake of the Australian Institute of Architect's 1969 conference...") In 2005 the Union House project was awarded the Jack Cheesman Award for Enduring Architecture by the South Australian Chapter of the Australian Institute of Architects.

== Heritage listing ==
The Union Building Group was state heritage-listed on 25 July 2002 on the South Australian Heritage Register.

== See also ==
- University of Adelaide#Buildings
