= Jack Cheesman Award for Enduring Architecture =

Annual award for culturally significant buildings in South Australia

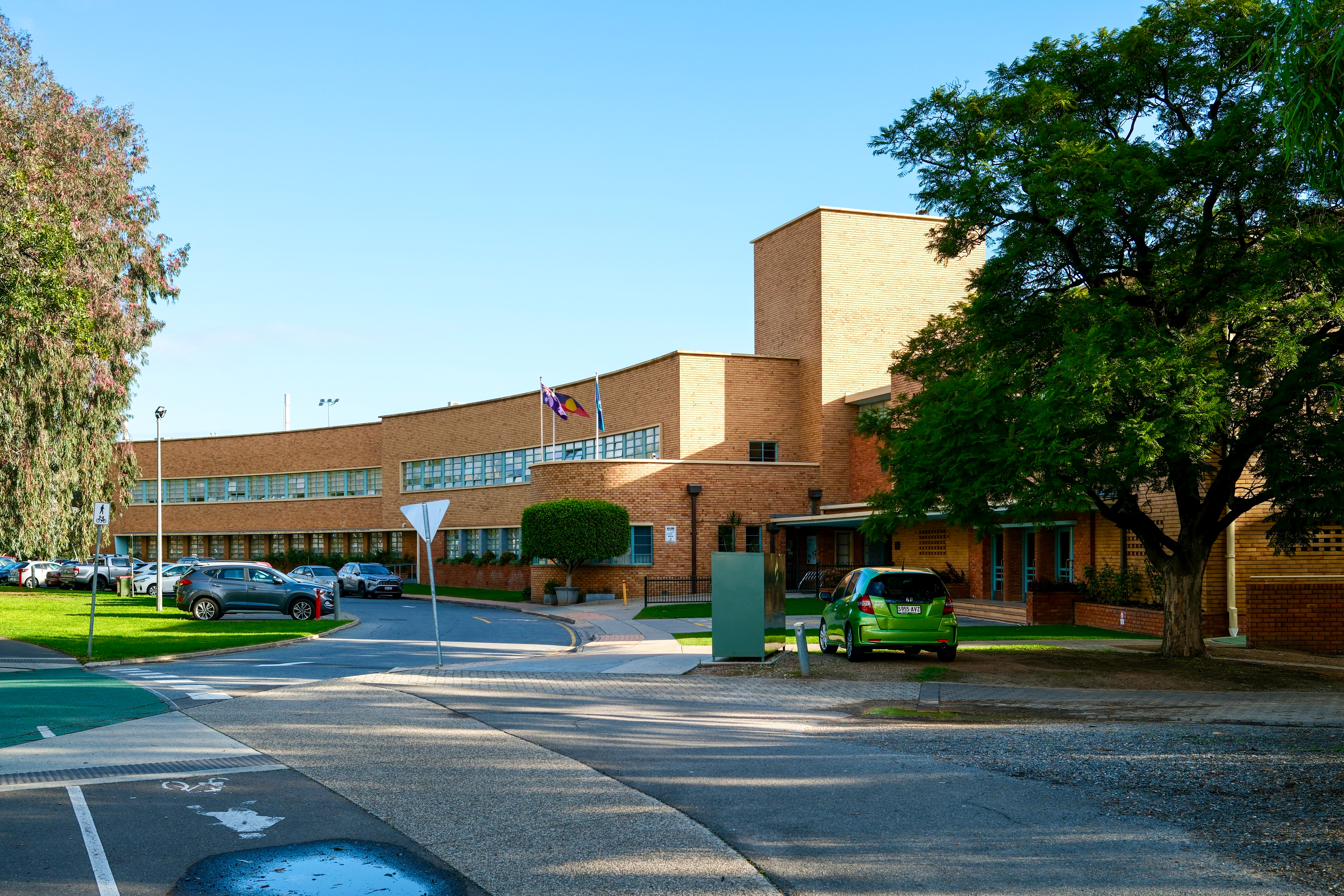
- Adelaide High School, 2026 Award
- Awarded for: Significant South Australian architecture more than 25 years old
- Country: Australia
- Presented by: Australian Institute of Architects (South Australia Chapter)
- First award: 2005; 21 years ago
- Currently held by: Adelaide High School, 2026
- Website: https://www.architecture.com.au/awards/2024-awards/2024-sa-architecture-awards-winners

The Jack Cheesman Award for Enduring Architecture, formerly known as the 25 Year Award is an architecture prize presented annually by the South Australia Chapter of the Australian Institute of Architects (AIA).

== History ==
The inaugural award was given in 2005 and was known as the 25 Year Award until at least 2011. The average age of the 16 projects recognised to 2024 is 36.6 years from completion of construction to year of award. The award was issued every second year from 2005 until 2013, and has been awarded annually since 2014 (see table below).

== Description ==
The award recognises significant, long lasting and innovative architecture with usually more than 25 years passed since the completion of construction. The Enduring Architecture Award recognises achievement for the design of buildings of outstanding merit, which have remained important as high quality works of architecture when considered in contemporary cultural, social, economic and environmental contexts in South Australia. Nominations for the award can be made by AIA members, non–members and non–architects, but must provide adequate material and information supporting the nomination for consideration of the jury.

== National Awards ==
Recipients of the state–based award are eligible for consideration for the National Award for Enduring Architecture presented later in the same year, as part of the Australian National Architecture Awards. As of 2025 no South Australian projects had received the National Award.

== By year ==
=== 2007 award ===
When awarding the second award to Newell Platten for Dr Kent's Paddock in 2007, the jury citation read; "The 25 Year Award is not given lightly and it has been two years since it was last awarded — but the Jury's views were unanimous. Dr Kent’s Paddock, more that any other project of its time embodies the virtues of this award — a project of considerable influence for its time and place, and one that has stood the test of time. All the more potent is that it was carried out by the most venerable of South Australia’s institutions, the South Australian Housing Trust, its role now incorporated within Housing SA".

=== 2022 award ===
The Jury for the 2022 award was composed of Honours Committee members Anthony Coupe, David Hassell, Rob Cheesman, Lolita Mohyla, Tony Giannone, Elaine Davies and Lu Balsamo. The award was given to Robin Boyd's Walkley House built in North Adelaide in 1956.

=== 2023 award ===
The Jury for the 2023 award was Anthony Coupe, Chris Morley, Elaine Davies, Lolita Mohyla, Lu Balsamo and Rob Cheesman. The award was given to the Adelaide Festival Centre by Hassell, opened in 1973. The jury citation described the project saying "The Adelaide Festival Centre is not only instantly recognisable, it also represents an important period in South Australian history and is integral to our identity as the Festival State. Buildings that achieve all these things at once are rare, and for the Festival Centre to have done so for 50 years is truly worthy of celebration."

=== 2024 award ===
The jury for the 2024 award was Anthony Coupe (Mulloway) and Lolita Mohyla (Mohyla Architects) and retired architects Rob Cheesman (Cheesman), Elaine Davies (DaSH), Lu Balsamo (Hassell) and Adrian Evans (JPE). The jury citation described the awarded project, the Science Technology and Art Centre at St Peters College (SPCS) by Geof Nairn stating "the project realises the SPCS ethos to ‘cherish history while embracing the ever-evolving landscape of education’. The new building is clearly of its time, with saw tooth roofs and glazed facades providing ample natural light. The siting, roof pitch and rendered walls defer to adjacent sandstone buildings."

== Award recipients ==
Jack Cheesman Award for Enduring Architecture (reverse order)
| Year | Architect | Project | Location | Year built | Years since | Other AIA/RAIA awards |
|---|---|---|---|---|---|---|
| 2026 | Edward B. Fitzgerald and John R. Brogan | Adelaide High School | West Terrace, Adelaide | 1951 | 75 years | |
| 2025 | No Award | | | | | |
| 2024 | Geof Nairn Architects | St Peter’s Collegiate School (SPCS) Science, Technology and Art Centre | 12 Pembroke Street, St Peters, Adelaide | 1999 | 25 years | |
| 2023 | Hassell & Partners | Adelaide Festival Centre | King William Road, Adelaide | 1973 | 50 years | |
| 2022 | Robin Boyd | Walkley House | 26-27 Palmer Place, North Adelaide | 1956 | 66 years | |
| 2021 | SA Public Buildings Department (Architect Adrian Evans) & SACON (Architect Denis Harrison) | Juvenile Court (now Youth Court of South Australia) | 75 Wright Street, Adelaide | 1975 | 46 years | RAIA Award of Merit 1976 |
| 2020 | Cheesman Doley Brabham & Neighbour | Nunyara Chapel | 8 Culley Avenue, Belair | 1963 | 57 years | RAIA Award of Merit, 1966 |
| 2019 | Hassell & Partners | Colonel Light Centre | 25 Pirie Street, Adelaide | 1978 | 41 years | |
| 2018 | Max Pritchard | Pritchard House | | 1990 | 28 years | Commendation — Residential, 1991 |
| 2017 | SACON (Architect Carlo Gnezda) | Adelaide Velodrome | State Sports Park, Main North Road, Gepps Cross | 1993 | 24 years | National Commendation for Public Architecture, 1993 (National Awards) |
| 2016 | SA Public Buildings Department (Architect Kevin Hocking) | South Australian Forensic Science Centre | 21 Divett Place, Adelaide | 1978 | 38 years | |
| 2015 | Geof Nairn Architects | Centennial Park Chapel Complex (Heysen and Florey Chapels) | 760 Goodwood Road, Pasadena | 1986 | 29 years | |
| 2014 | Guy Maron Architect | Bicentennial Conservatory | Plane Tree Drive, Adelaide Botanic Gardens | 1988 | 26 years | Sir Zelman Cowen Award for Public Architecture, 1991 (National) |
| 2013 | Rod Roach | Roach House Belair | 21 Fourth Road, Belair, South Australia | 1971 | 42 years | Derrick Kendrick Award for Sustainable Architecture, 2013 |
| 2012 | No Award† | | | | | |
| 2011 | Guy Maron Architect | Regency Park College of TAFE | 137 Days Road, Regency Park | 1980? | 31 years | |
| 2010 | No Award† | | | | | |
| 2009 | Rod Roach with Woodhead | Adelaide Fire Station | 81–129 Wakefield Street, Adelaide | 1985 | 24 years | |
| 2008 | No Award† | | | | | |
| 2007 | Newell Platten, Chief Design Architect, South Australian Housing Trust | Dr Kent's Paddock and Open Space | 3—57 Capper Street & 28—48 Rundle Street, Kent Town | 1979 | 28 years | |
| 2006 | No Award† | | | | | |
| 2005 | Robert Dickson | Adelaide University Union, Union House | Victoria Drive, University of Adelaide, Adelaide | 1975 | 30 years | RAIA Award of Merit, 1974; Civic Trust Award, 1975 |

† Award was presented biennially from 2005—2013

== Gallery ==
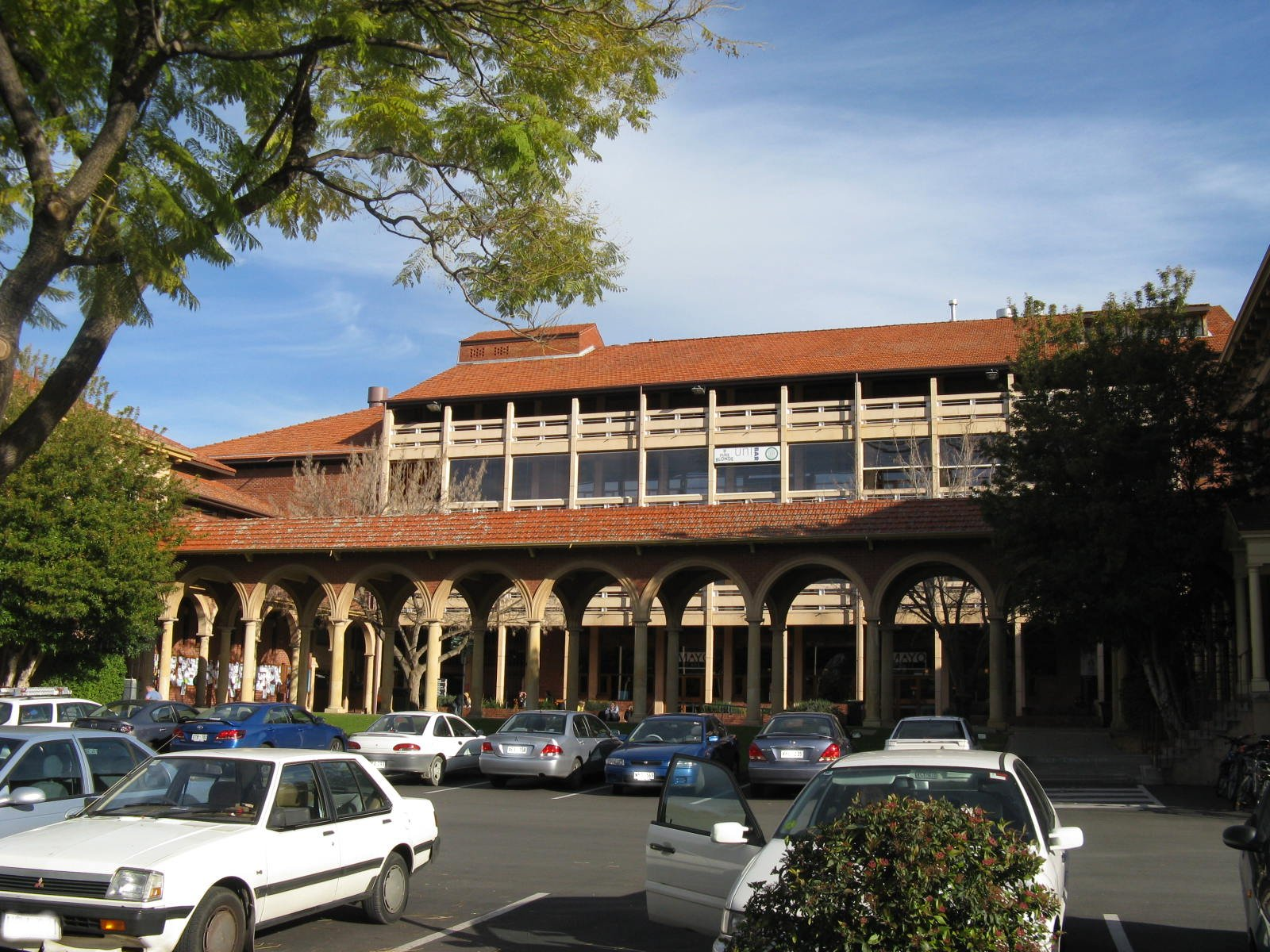
2005 Award, Adelaide University Union building, opened 1975

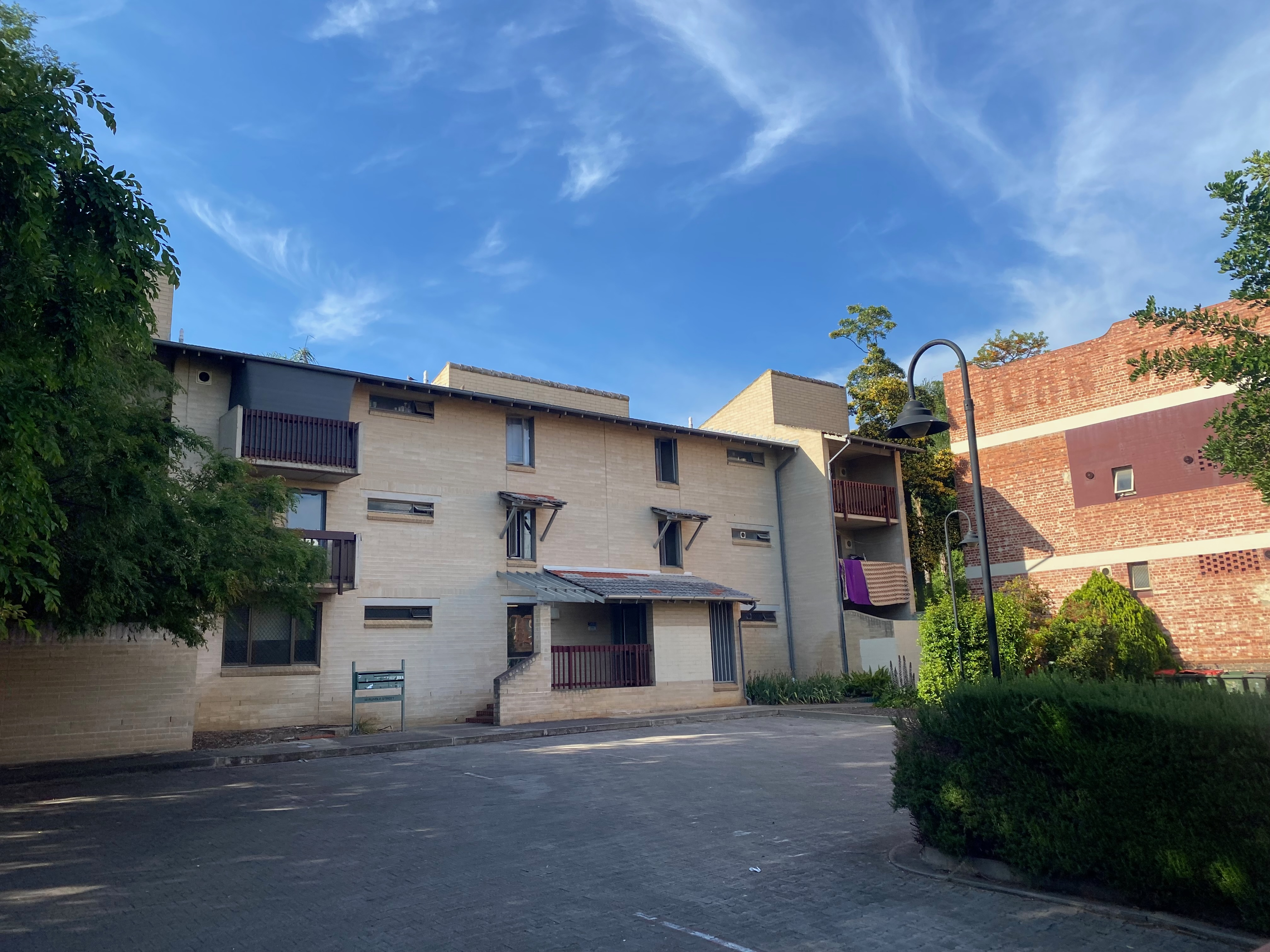
2007 Award, Dr Kent's Paddock, Kent Town, built 1979

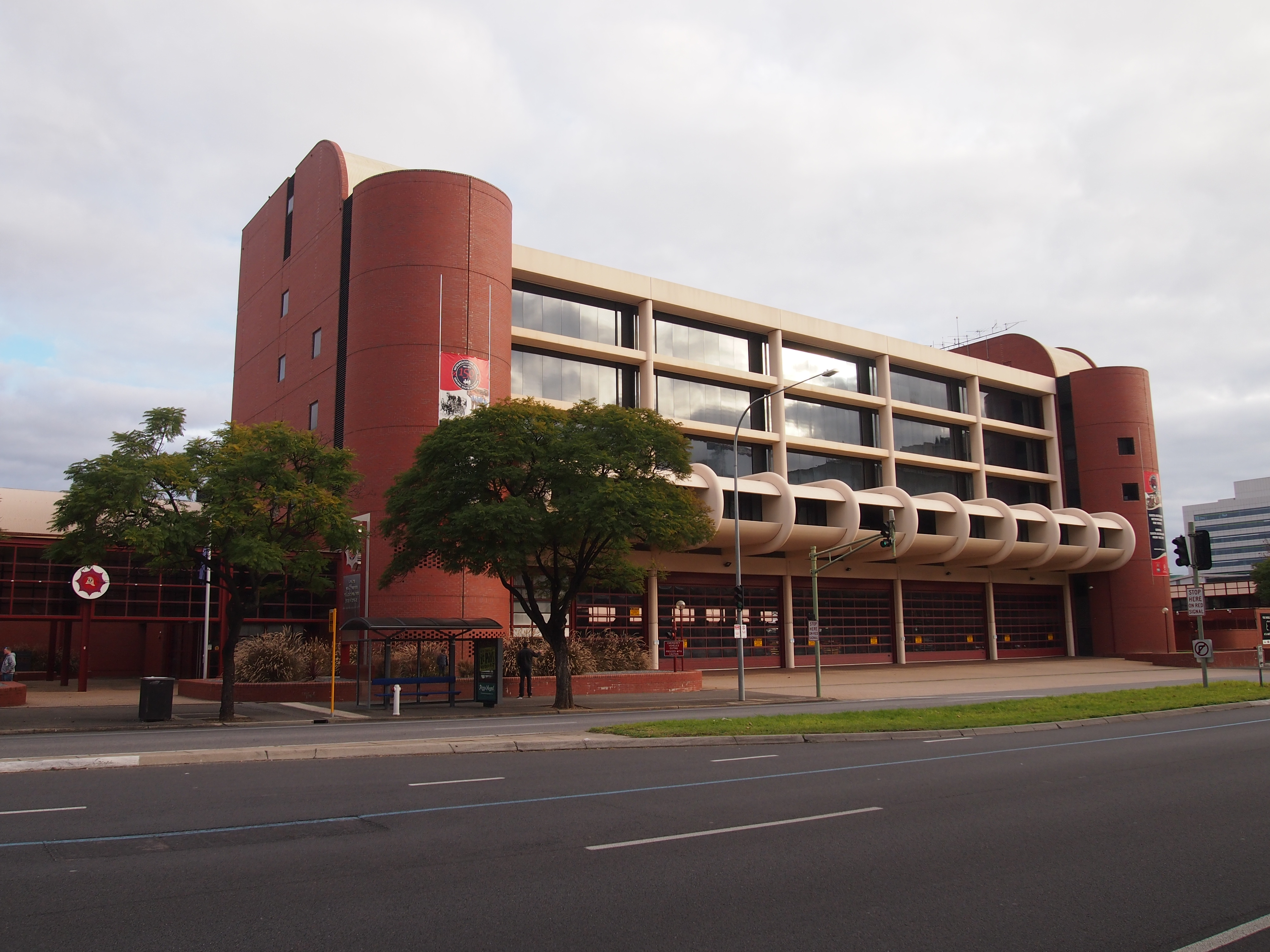
2009 Award, Adelaide Fire Station, Wakefield Street, Adelaide, built 1985

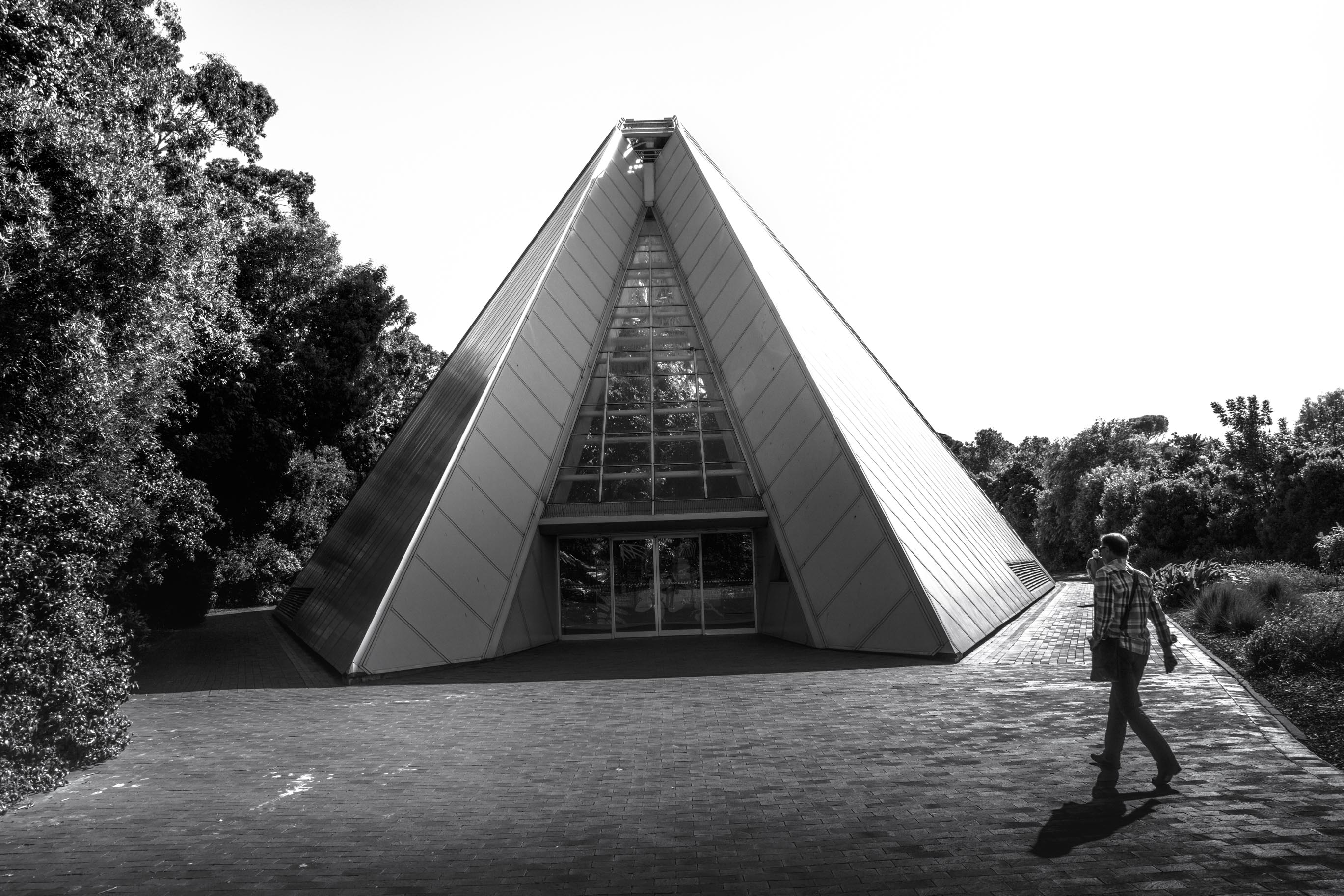
2014 Award, Bicentennial Conservatory, Adelaide Botanic Garden, built 1988

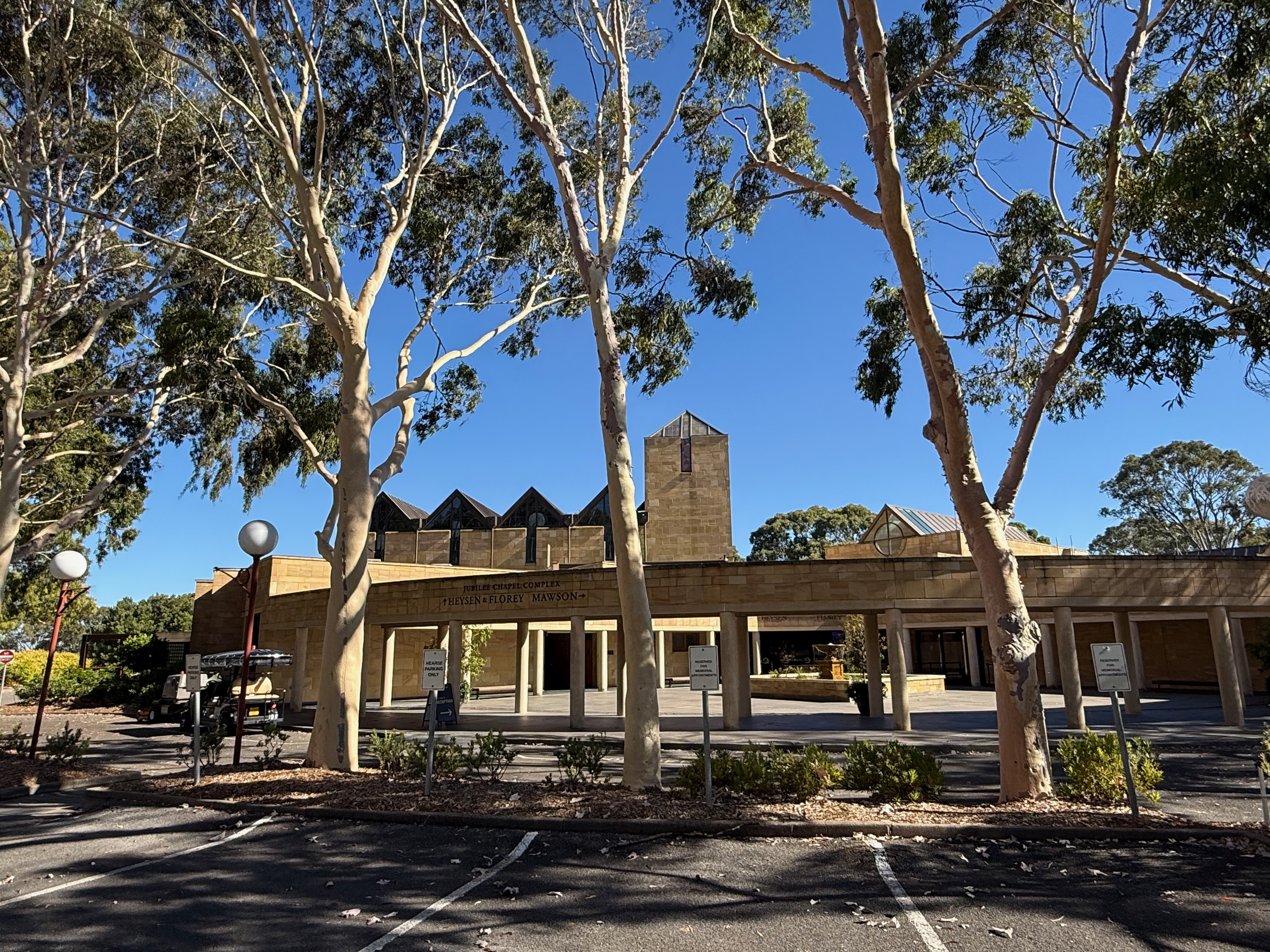
2015 Award, Centennial Park Chapel Complex (Heysen and Florey Chapels), built 1986

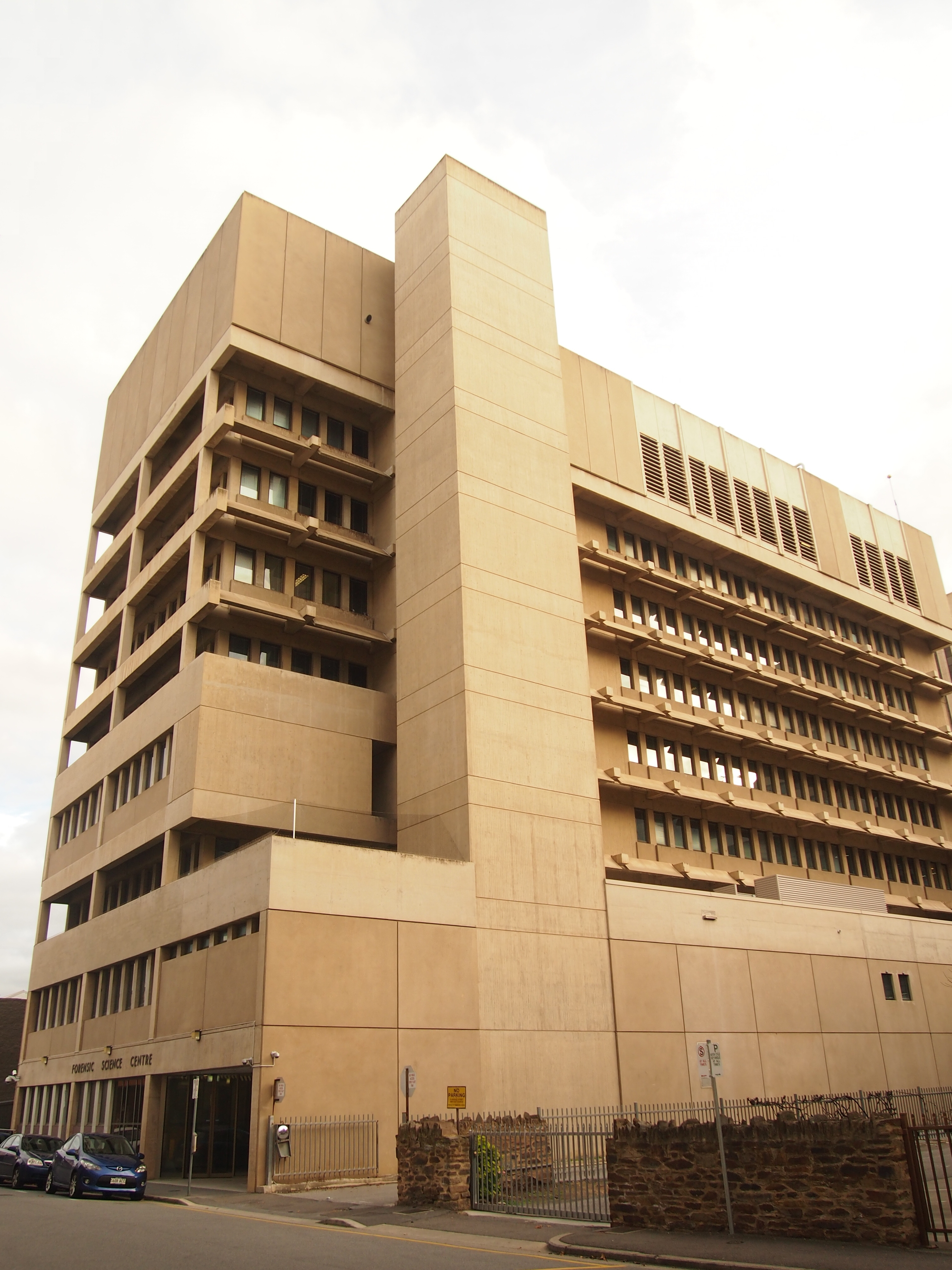
2016 Award, South Australian Forensic Science Centre, Adelaide, built 1978

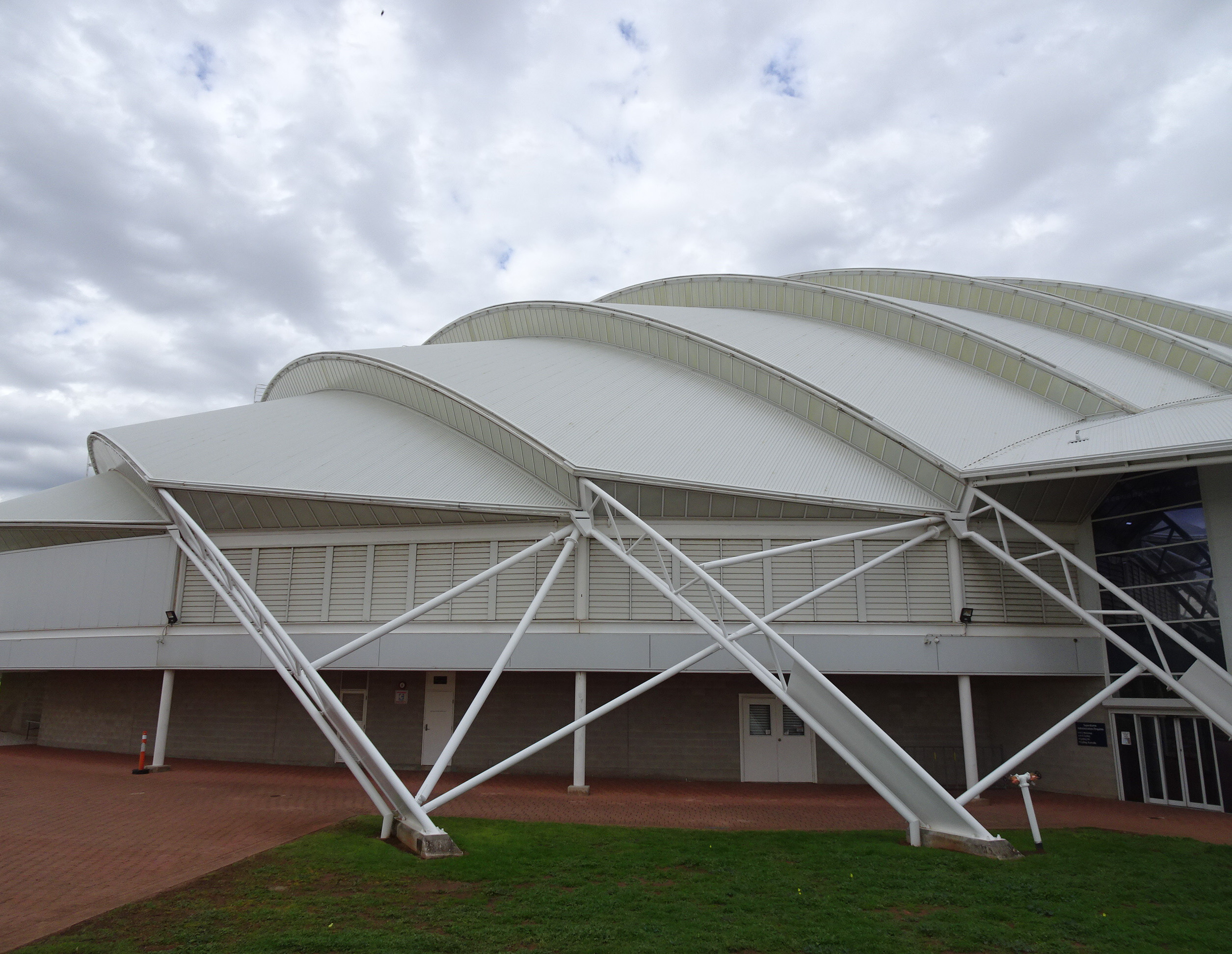
2017 Award, Adelaide Velodrome, Gepps Cross, built 1993

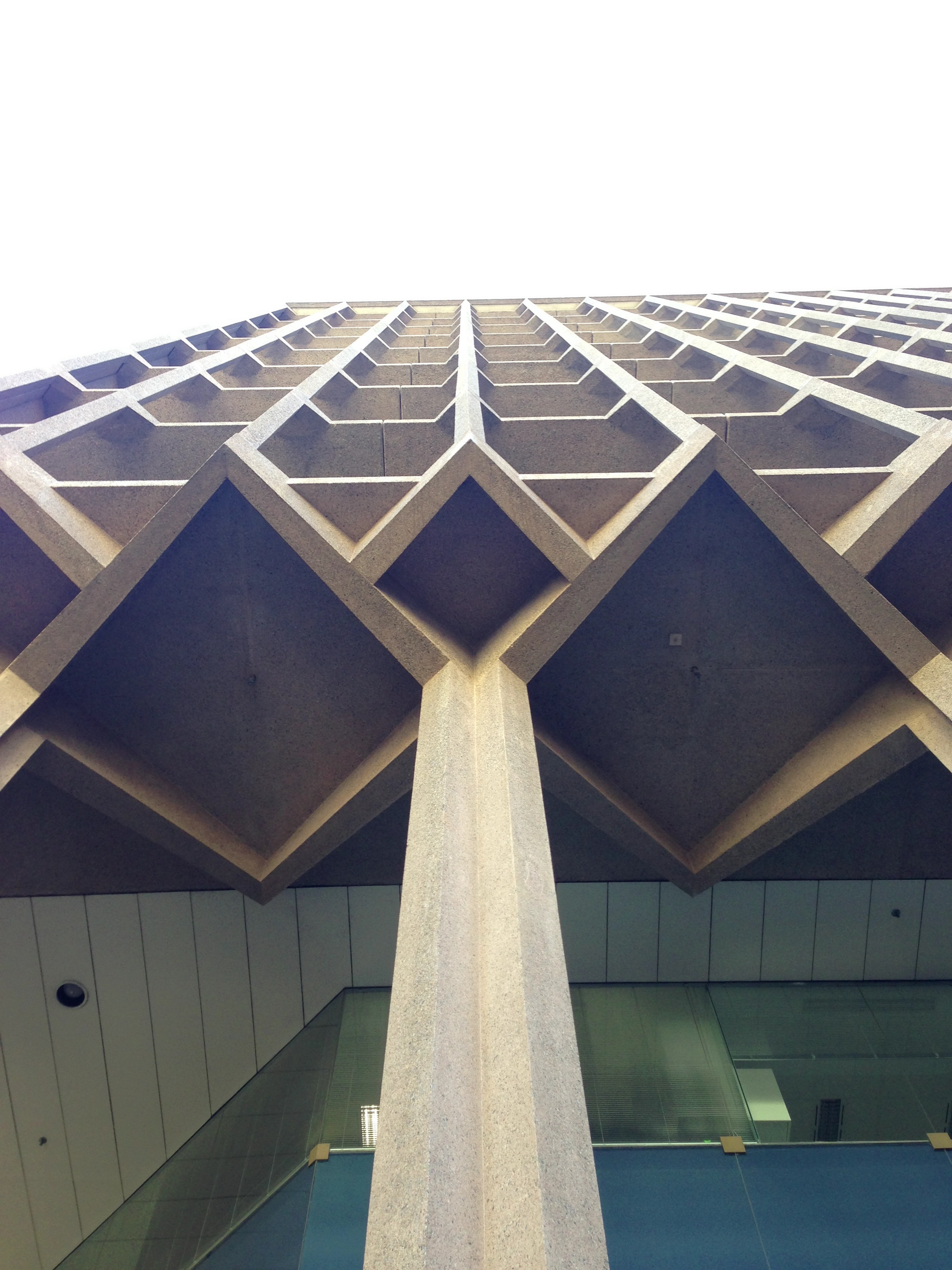
2019 Award, Colonel Light Centre (City of Adelaide offices), Pirie Street, built 1978

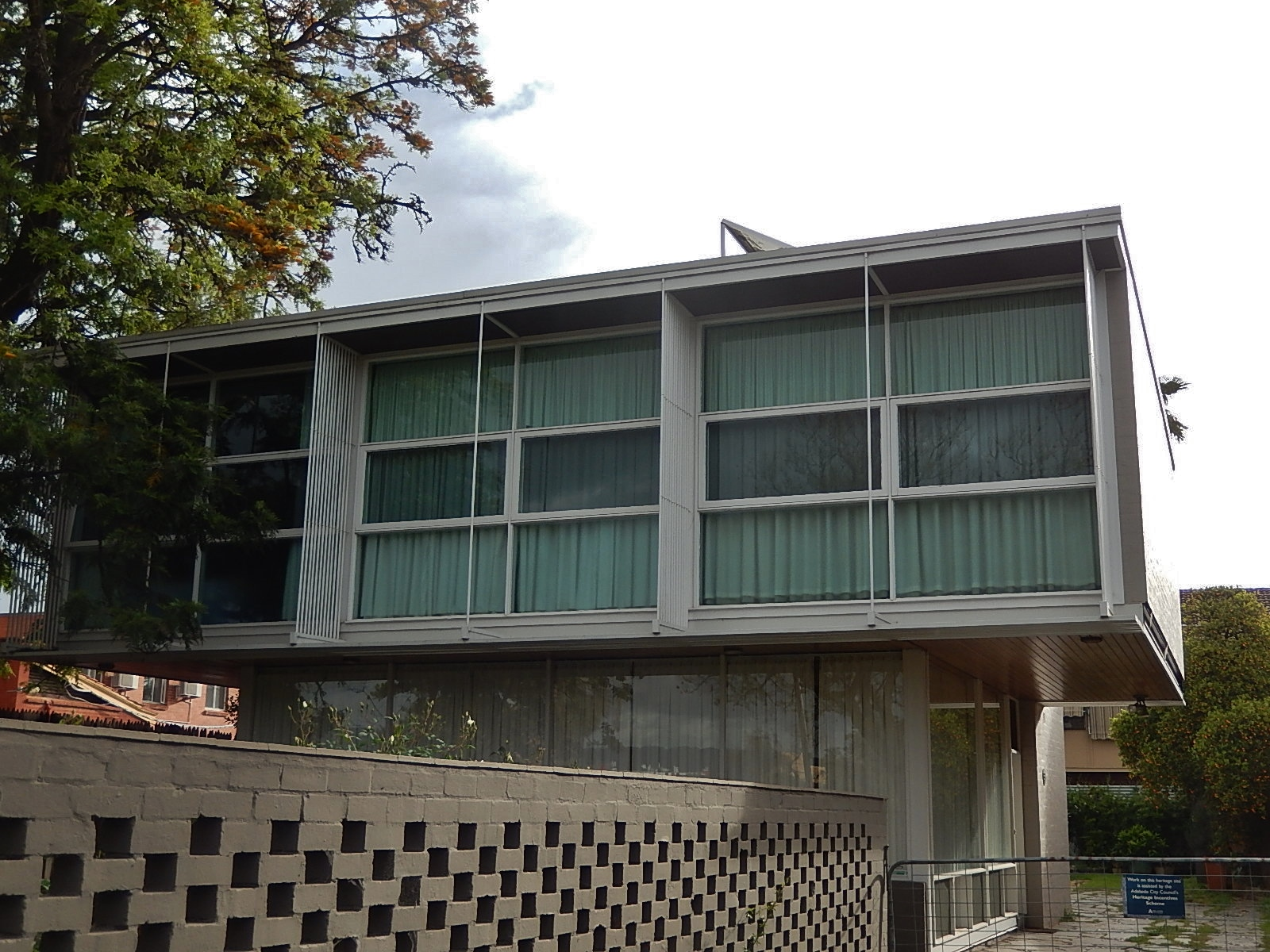
2022 Award, Walkley House, North Adelaide, built 1956

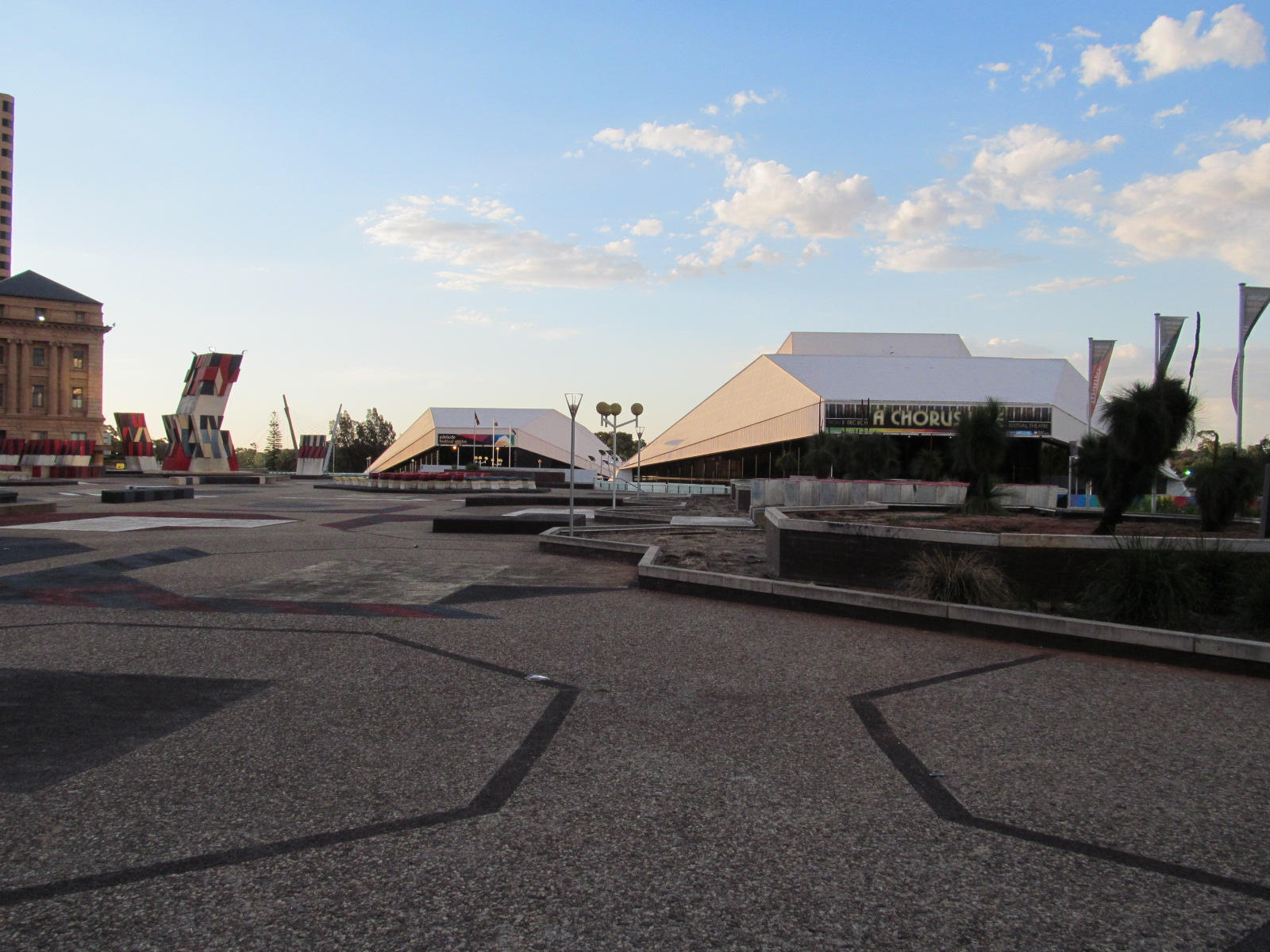
2023 Award, Adelaide Festival Centre, opened 1973

== See also ==
- Australian Institute of Architects
- Australian Institute of Architects Awards and Prizes
- National Award for Enduring Architecture
- Sir Roy Grounds Award for Enduring Architecture
