= Robert Dickson (architect) =

Australian architect (1926–2014)

- Born: Robert Harold Dickson; 8 April 1926; Adelaide, Australia
- Died: 8 April 2014 (aged 88)
- Occupation: Architect
- Awards: RAIA (SA Chapter) Award of Merit x 8, 25 Year Award 2005
- Buildings: Dickson House, Rostrevor; The Arkaba Projects; Linked Town Houses; Adelaide University Union Redevelopment

Robert Harold Dickson (8 April 1926 — 8 April 2014) was a South Australian architect. His many works contributed greatly to various aspects of South Australian architecture, ranging from conservation shelters to school buildings and residential projects. His most notable works are former premier, Don Dunstan's residence, the first townhouses in Adelaide and the University of Adelaide's Union House. He was described by Don Dunstan as the "premier architect".

Whilst he spent the majority of his life practising in South Australia, he did work for a Milan–based Italian firm, Mangiarotti and Morasutti, for less than a year. He was also employed at Fry, Drew, Drake and Lasdun in London for a short time directly afterwards. Firms bearing his name in Adelaide were Dickson and Platten (1958–1973), Robert Dickson and Associates (1973–1990) and Robert Dickson Architects (1990–2014).

He also wrote articles on architecture for local newspapers and was a tutor at the University of Adelaide Faculty of Architecture and Planning. He published an autobiography entitled Addicted to Architecture.

== Early life ==
Robert Harold Dickson, born on 8 April 1926, grew up in North Adelaide, a place he describes as a "compelling urban paradise". He attended Christ Church School from age 4 to 11 and Adelaide High for secondary education, where he met his wife, Lilian. After graduating from high school in 1943, he enlisted to become a pilot at 17 years old. Throughout his life, he was obsessed with the theory of flight and joining the Royal Australian Air Force (RAAF) was a realisation of that boyhood passion. When his programme was abandoned and flight training ceased in May 1945, he was co-opted into the Royal Air Force to work in Air Transport Command. (He did not fly again until 48 years later when an opportunity to pilot a restored Tiger Moth at Noarlunga arose.) Shortly thereafter, he applied to be discharged (as was allowed for RAAF aircrew who wanted to take up tertiary training) and was flown back to Adelaide when the application was accepted. Although he had applied, he had no idea what educational path he wanted to go down. It was his father's suggestion of architectural training that was pivotal.

== Architecture training and career ==
He started the architectural course in 1946. His architectural course was based on the Beaux Arts model, a system he disagreed with and tried to rebel against in his student assignments. He began designing his first house in 1949 when still a student, and the project became a major part of his studies. He took a year off to construct it in 1951. By the time it was habitable, he and Lilian were married. That house was still their home 57 years later.

As a student, Dickson successfully applied for part-time work in the office Claridge, Hassell and McConnell where he was mentored by another student, Brian Claridge, and Ron Gunn, the associate. He and Claridge became close friends. After a few years, the firm split into Claridge and Gunn, and Hassell and McConnell, with Dickson going with the latter because of the projects he had been working on at the time. He continued at that office after he graduated, whilst participating in part-time post-graduate studies in City Planning and Illuminating Engineering.

By 1954, Dickson was getting more and more dissatisfied with the direction contemporary architecture was taking, feeling that the post-war architecture was becoming stagnant and cliché. This was what prompted him to start looking at work being done in Europe, more specifically, Italy. A firm in Milan, Mangiarotti and Morassutti, granted him an interview. Robert and Lilian Dickson both went to Milan, stopping first in England to visit relatives and making their way from there. The two returned to Adelaide in 1957, and their son was born within weeks of their return. Dickson started his own practice, as well as taught part-time and wrote for the paper, before entering a partnership with Newell Platten that lasted from 1958 to 1973.

=== Architectural philosophy ===
Dickson shared a practical design philosophy which flat-out rejected the idea of architectural "style". It was based on principles that design should respond to the surrounding environment, respect human values, aspire to direct solutions to problems and integrate the parts in the simplest possible form. His work displays a sensitive relationship to site, intuitive use of materials and care about design and craftsmanship.

Dickson's work revolves around sustainable design and environmental concerns, which filters into his architecture, from construction methods and materiality to the extensive involvement with the local community.

== Selected works ==
- The Arkaba Projects (1950)
- Dickson House, Rostrevor, Adelaide (1957–67)
- Linked Town Houses, North Adelaide (1966)
- Mylor Youth Camp, Mylor (1969)
- Adelaide University Union Redevelopment (1967–75)
- Architect's Office, North Adelaide (1970)
- Hackney Neighbourhood Renewal, Hackney (1971)
- Cluster houses for West Lakes, West Lakes (1972)
- West Lakes Primary School, West Lakes (1972)
- Whyalla Sports Complex, Whyalla (1974)
- Proposed town centre for Monarto (lead draftsman), Monarto (1975)
- Regency Park Golf Club Clubhouse, Regency Park (1978)
- Water Treatment Plant, Morgan (1981)
- Old Gum Tree Conservation Shelter, Holdfast Bay (1984)
- Extensions for Art gallery of South Australia, Adelaide (1990)
- Office building for Associated Securities Limited, Adelaide
- Salisbury Civic Centre, Salisbury (1975)
- Munno Para Civic Centre, Munno Para
- Premier Don Dunstan residence
- East Torrens Civic Centre, East Torrens
- Meadows Civic Centre, Meadows

== Firms and partnerships ==
- Claridge, Hassell and McConnell (1948–1955)
- Mangiarotti and Morasutti (1955–1956)
- Fry, Drew, Drake and Lasdun (1956)
- Robert Dickson (1957)
- Dickson and Platten (1958–1973)
- Robert Dickson and Associates (1973–1990)
- Robert Dickson Architects (1990–2014)

== Awards ==
=== Australian Institute of Architects Awards ===
- RAIA (SA Chapter) Award of Merit for Arkaba Hotel
- RAIA (SA Chapter) Award of Merit for Linked Town Houses, North Adelaide
- RAIA (SA Chapter) Award of Merit for Kathleen Lurnley Postgraduate College
- RAIA (SA Chapter) Award of Merit for House at Millswood
- RAIA (SA Chapter) Citation for Adelaide University Union Bookshop
- RAIA (SA Chapter) Citation for Office Building for Associated Securities Ltd
- RAIA (SA Chapter) Award of Merit for Union House, University of Adelaide
- RAIA (SA Chapter) Award of Merit for Salisbury Civic Centre
- RAIA (SA Chapter) Award of Merit for Hope Valley Water Treatment Plant Buildings
- RAIA (SA Chapter) Award of Merit 1996, Adelaide City Council Commendation, and Adelaide Prize Commendation for Art Gallery of South Australia Additions (in association with Peddle Thorp, Sydney office)
- RAIA Sir Zelman Cowen Award for Public Architecture Commendation (National awards) 1996, for Art Gallery of South Australia Additions (in association with Peddle Thorp, Sydney office)
- RAIA (SA Chapter) inaugural 25 Year Award 2005, for University of Adelaide Union Redevelopment

=== Civic Trust of South Australia Awards ===
Dickson has won the following awards from the Civic Trust of South Australia (now Australian Civic Trust)

- Civic Trust of SA 1977 Award for Salisbury Civic Centre
- Civic Trust of SA 1978 Award for Hope Valley Water Treatment Plant
- Civic Trust of SA 1978 Award for Housing Estate, West Lakes
- Civic Trust of SA 1982 Award for Union House, University of Adelaide
- Civic Trust of SA 1982 Award for Housing, Margaret Street, North Adelaide
- Civic Trust of SA 1986 Commendation for Housing, Hackney
- Civic Trust of SA 1988 Commendation for Morgan SA Water Treatment Plant
- Civic Trust of SA 1988 Award for Conservation Shelter, Old Gum Tree
- Civic Trust of SA 1989 Commendation for Memorial Clock Tower
- Civic Trust of SA 1997 Award for Art Gallery of South Australia

== State heritage listings ==
Four buildings designed by Dickson have been listed on the South Australian Heritage Register:

- Union House, an addition to the Union Building Group, The University of Adelaide, Adelaide.
- Kathleen Lumley College, North Adelaide.
- Dickson House, Rostrevor.
- Dickson Beach House, Normanville.
