= Dickson House, Rostrevor, Adelaide =

Residence of architect Robert Dickson

Dickson House
- Interactive map of the Dickson House area

General information
- Location: Rostrevor, South Australia, 1 Wandilla Drive
- Coordinates: 34°53′43″S 138°41′28″E
- Construction started: 1949
- Completed: 1951
- Client: Robert Dickson

Design and construction
- Architect: Robert Dickson

The Dickson House (1950) is the residence of architect Robert Dickson and his partner Lilian, located at Wandilla Drive in Rostrevor, South Australia. The house design commenced in 1949, three years into his architectural studies and in 1951 he took a year off to build it. Situated on a sloping side opposite the Morialta Conservation Park, the site characteristics, topography, orientation, views, and approach dictate the planning arrangement, while responding to local materials and a limited budget.

In 2009 the house was listed as a state heritage place on the South Australian Heritage Register, a gratifying achievement for Dickson as a simple contemporary, student-designed house built in 1950 is not commonly associated with heritage listing. Its significance is reported as follows:

Dickson House at Rostrevor has unique and significant associations with the life and work of Robert Dickson, and demonstrates a high degree of creative, aesthetic and technical accomplishment as well as being an influential representative of modern organic design and construction. In particular, the way in which the place relates to its site, its outstanding quality and integrity, and the fact that it has been internationally recognised as one of Australia's most architecturally-notable mid-20th-century houses provide it with outstanding significance in the context of South Australia's architectural development. (HB Assessment Report 11/2008)
