= Reinhold Martin =

American architect

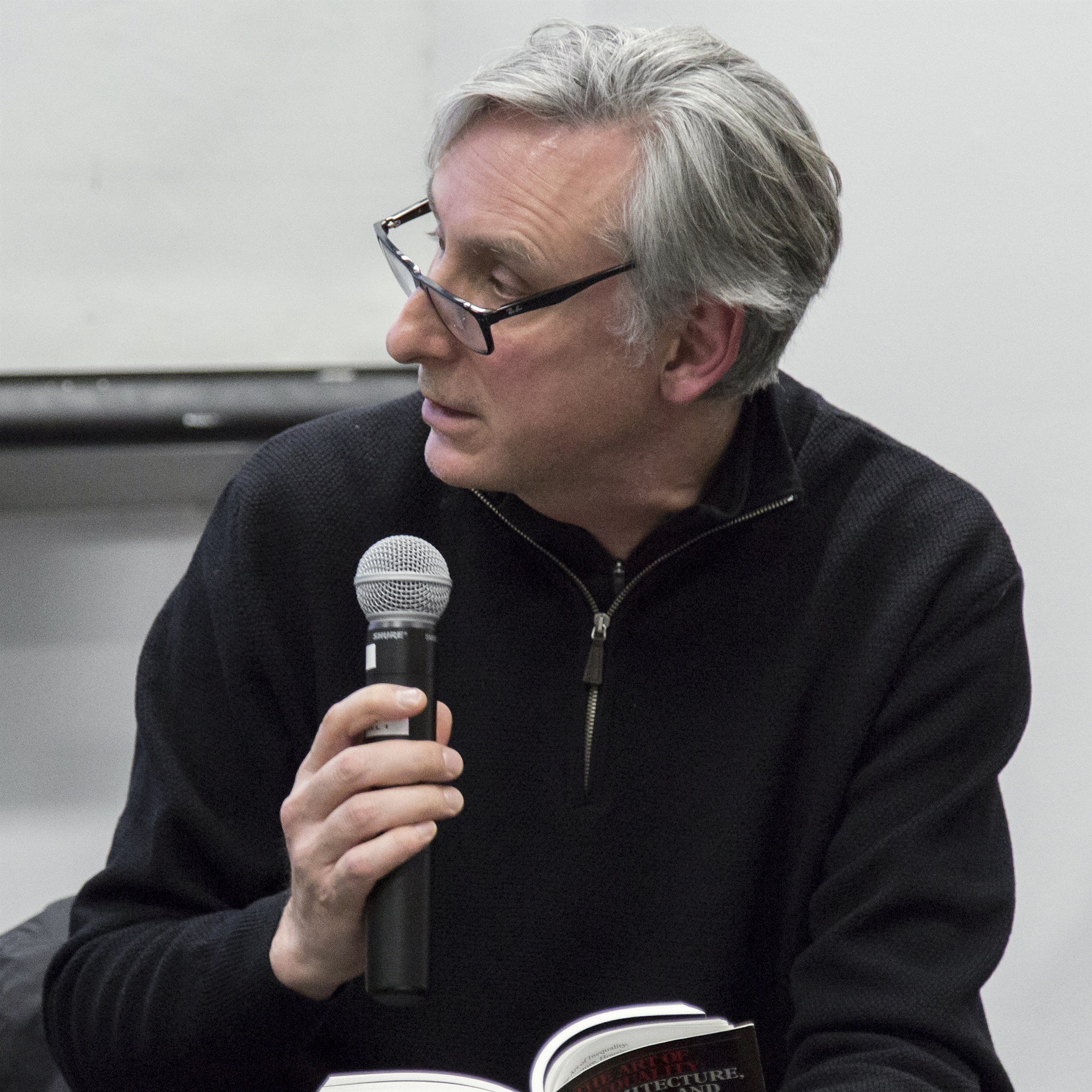
- Martin at "The Art of inequality" event at Columbia GSAPP (2016)
- Born: 1964 (age 61–62)
- Education: Princeton University
- Writing career
- Notable works: Utopia's Ghost (2010); The Urban Apparatus: Mediapolitics and the City (2017)

Reinhold Martin (born 1964) is an American architectural historian and professor. He currently serves as Professor of Architecture in the Graduate School of Architecture, Planning, and Preservation at Columbia University, where he directed the Temple Hoyne Buell Center for the Study of American Architecture. He is also a member of the Institute for Comparative Literature and Society and the Committee on Global Thought at Columbia. Until 2008, Martin was a partner in the architectural firm Martin/Baxi Architects with Kadambari Baxi.

== Education ==
He has a Bachelor of Architecture from Rensselaer Polytechnic Institute and a Graduate Diploma from the Architectural Association. In 1999 Martin received his Ph.D from the Princeton University School of Architecture. His dissertation was entitled Architecture and Organization, USA c. 1956.

== Publications ==
- The Urban Apparatus: Mediapolitics and the City. Minneapolis: University of Minnesota Press, 2016. ISBN 1517901197
- Mediators: Aesthetics, Politics, and the City. Minneapolis: University of Minnesota Press, 2014. ISBN 081669687X
- Utopia's Ghost: Architecture and Postmodernism, Again. Minneapolis, Minn.: University of Minnesota Press, 2010. ISBN 0816669635
- The Organizational Complex: Architecture, Media, and Corporate Space. Cambridge, Mass.: MIT Press, 2003. ISBN 0262633264
- (with Kadambari Baxi) Multi-National City: Architectural Itineraries. Barcelona: Actar, 2007. ISBN 8496540626
- (with Kadambari Baxi) Entropia. London: Black Dog Pub, 2000 ISBN 1901033325
- (with Kadambari Baxi) Propositions. London: Black Dog Pub, 1993. ISBN 0952177307
- (with Jacob Moore and Susanne Schindler) The Art of Inequality: Architecture, Housing, and Real Estate : A Provisional Report. New York: Temple Hoyne Buell Center for the Study of American Architecture, Columbia University, 2015. ISBN 1941332226
- (edited, with Barry Bergdoll) Foreclosed: Rehousing the American Dream. New York, N.Y: Museum of Modern Art, 2012. ISBN 0870708279

In 2000 Martin founded the journal Grey Room together with Branden Joseph and Felicity Scott.
