= The Arkaba Projects =

Construction project in Adelaide, South Australia (1957–1967)

The Arkaba Projects (1957–1967) are a range of works undertaken in the Australian state of South Australia during the ongoing association between architect Robert Dickson and entrepreneur Istvan (Steve) Zsolt, consisting of restaurants, flats, motels, and hotels. Typically in odd or difficult circumstances, the projects often commenced with little preparation and required urgent design and construction responses. The architectural opportunities he presented were challenging, although this meant an increased responsibility in design expression and also made for unique design freedom. The Arkaba restaurant and hotel complex in Fullarton, South Australia were the practice’s first large scale commercial project and known for its intimate planning and straight forward use of natural materials.

== Collection ==
- Roadhouse Restaurant
- Red Wine Grill Restaurant
- Arkaba Court Flats (later becoming Arkaba Court Motel)
- The Arkaba Hotel extension
- Seabreeze Hotel
- Arkaba Corner Hotel, Restaurant and Ballroom (1963), Fullarton, Adelaide

== See also ==
- Architecture in South Australia
