= Jonathan Crary =

American art critic

- Born: Jonathan Crary
- Education: Columbia University (BA, PhD); San Francisco Art Institute (BFA)
- Occupations: Writer, art critic
- Writing career
- Notable awards: Guggenheim Fellowship (1991)

Jonathan Crary is an American art critic and essayist. He is the Meyer Schapiro Professor of Modern Art and Theory at Columbia University. His first notable works were Techniques of the Observer: On Vision and Modernity in the 19th Century (1990), and Suspensions of Perception: Attention, Spectacle, and Modern Culture (2000). He has published critical essays for more than 30 exhibition catalogues. A dominant analytical theme in his work is the history of vision, observation and perception.

== Education ==
Crary attended high school at the Putney School in Vermont. He graduated from Columbia College, where he was an art history major. In 1987, he received his Ph.D. from Columbia University. Crary also earned a B.F.A. from the San Francisco Art Institute, where he studied film and photography.

== Teaching ==
He first taught in the Visual Arts Department at the University of California, San Diego. In 1989, he began teaching at Columbia University full-time. He received a Guggenheim Fellowship in 1991.

== Writing ==
Crary's 24/7: Late Capitalism and the End of Sleep explores the nonstop pace of the modern world and its effects on human psychology and physiology, with an emphasis on sleep patterns.

His Suspensions of Perception focuses on the period from about 1880 to 1905, in which Crary describes the emergence of subjective vision. He also discusses how attention became a "new object within the modernization of subjectivity". The book examines how the perceptions of various cultures were reconstructed. This new development of vision created controversy because it implied that seeing depended upon one's subjective thoughts. Therefore, this new way of seeing was thought of as unclear, unreliable, and always questioned by a large population of people. Suspensions of Perception was published in 2000 and won the 2001 Lionel Trilling Book Award.

Crary's Techniques of the Observer is a study of the origins of modern visual culture. It was published in 1990 and translated into 12 languages.

Crary has written on art and culture for publications including Art in America, Artforum, October, Assemblage, Cahiers du Cinéma, Film Comment, Grey Room, Domus, and The Village Voice. He has also written critical essays for more than 30 exhibition catalogs. Crary contributed to the 7th edition of the anthology Film Theory and Criticism anthology.

In 1986, Crary was one of the founders of Zone Books, a press known for publications in history, art theory, politics, anthropology, and philosophy. He co-edited the 1992 volume Incorporations (Zone Books). Crary remains a co-editor at Zone Books.

== Bibliography ==
- Crary, Jonathan (2022). Scorched earth: beyond the digital age to a post-capitalist world. Verso. ISBN 978-1-78478-444-7.
- Crary, Jonathan (2013). 24/7: late capitalism and the ends of sleep. Verso. ISBN 978-1-78168-093-3.
- Crary, Jonathan (1999). Suspensions of perception: attention, spectacle, and modern culture. October Books. MIT Press. ISBN 978-0-585-27082-1.
- Crary, Jonathan; Kwinter, Sanford, eds. (1992). Incorporations. New York: Zone. ISBN 978-0-942299-29-8.
- Crary, Jonathan (1990). Techniques of the observer: on vision and modernity in the nineteenth century. MIT Press. ISBN 978-0-262-03169-1.
- Sternfeld, Joel; Crary, Jonathan (2010). iDubai. Göttingen: Steidl. ISBN 978-3-86521-916-9.
