= Felicity D. Scott =

Australian architect and academic (born 1965)

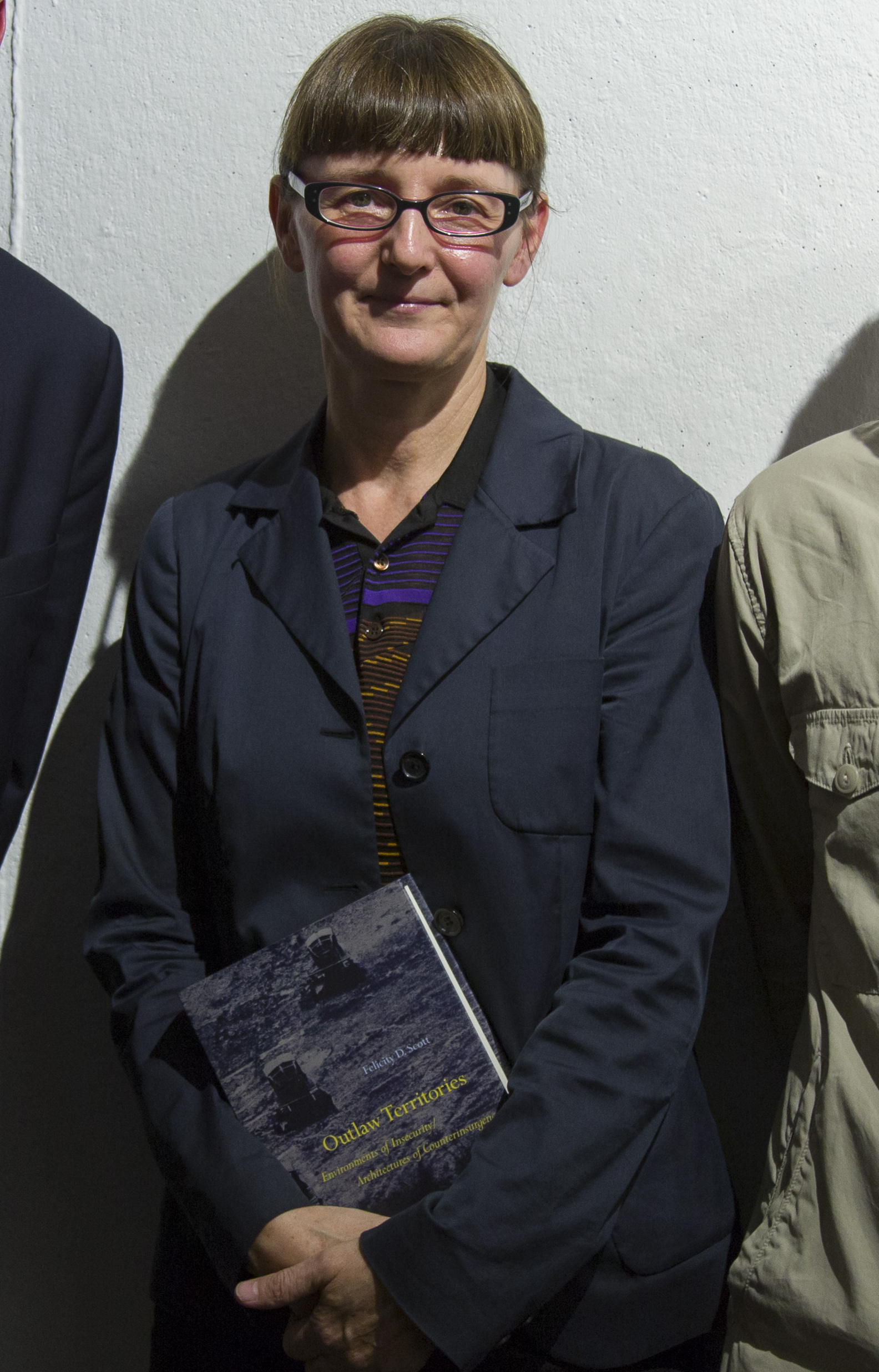
- Scott in 2016
- Born: 1965 (age 60–61)
- Education: Royal Melbourne Institute of Technology, University of Melbourne, Harvard Graduate School of Design, Princeton University School of Architecture
- Occupations: Academic, architect, architecture professor, professor, writer
- Employer: Columbia University Graduate School of Architecture
- Awards: Berlin Prize (American Academy in Berlin, 2013); William J. Mitchell Prize (2022)

Felicity D. Scott is an architect, writer, and academic. She is a professor of architecture at Columbia University in New York City.

== Early life and education ==
Following her undergraduate studies at the University of Melbourne, Scott received a master’s degree in architecture and urban design from Harvard University in 1994, and a PhD from Princeton University in 2001.

== Career ==
Scott is a professor at the Columbia Graduate School of Architecture, Planning and Preservation, where she is the director of the PhD program in Architecture (History and Theory), and co-director of the program in Critical, Curatorial and Conceptual Practices in Architecture (CCCP).

She is a founding co-editor of Grey Room, a quarterly academic journal published by MIT Press.

== Awards ==
Scott has received the German Transatlantic Berlin Prize from the American Academy in Berlin (2013), Graham Foundation for Advanced Studies in the Fine Arts Grants (2011, 2017), a New York State Council on the Arts Independent Project Award (2010), a Clark Fellowship (2008), and an Arts Writers Grant from Creative Capital / Warhol Foundation (2007). In 2022, Scott was honoured by the Australian Institute of Architects with the William J Mitchell International Chapter Prize, which recognises significant international contributions to architecture by an Australian.

== Publications ==
- Scott, Felicity D. (2007). Architecture or Techno-Utopia: Politics After Modernism. Cambridge, Massachusetts: MIT Press. ISBN 978-0-262-19562-1.
- Scott, Felicity Dale Elliston; Lord, Chip; Michels, Doug; Schreier, Curtis (2008). Allegorial Time Warp. New York City: Actar D. ISBN 978-84-96954-24-3.
- Scott, Felicity D. (2016). Outlaw Territories. New York: MIT Press. ISBN 978-1-935408-73-4.
- Scott, Felicity Dale Elliston (2016). Disorientation. Berlin: Sternberg Press. ISBN 978-3-95679-187-1.
