= Helen Lochhead =

Australian architect

Helen Marian Lochhead AO is an Australian architect and urbanist. Her career has focused on the inception, planning, design, and delivery of complex urban projects ranging from city improvements programs to major urban regeneration projects. She has held numerous roles in government, industry, and universities, including Dean, Faculty of Built Environment and Pro Vice-Chancellor, Precincts at UNSW Sydney, national president of the Australian Institute of Architects, and Deputy Government Architect in NSW.

== Early life and education ==
Helen Marian Lochhead graduated from the University of Sydney with a Bachelor of Science(Architecture) and Bachelor of Architecture. She went on to complete a Master of Science (Architecture and Urban Design), from Columbia Graduate School of Architecture, Planning and Preservation.

== Career ==
Lochhead is a registered architect, landscape architect, and planner. She has worked in senior management in both private and public sectors in Australia and the United States. Her career has primarily focused on urban design, public works, and complex large-scale urban regeneration projects. She has been a champion of women in architecture and construction, and established Engaging Women in Built Environment in 2016 to profile and connect women from research and industry.

Lochhead was a 2013–14 Lincoln/Loeb Fellow at the Graduate School of Design at Harvard University and the Lincoln Institute of Land Policy. During her fellowship she studied design, policy, and governance strategies that can deliver more sustainable climate-resilient coastal cities.

Lochhead was director of Helen Lochhead Urban Projects (1996–2006), where she prepared masterplans and development control plans, including Rozelle Hospital and Gladesville Hospital master plans, Rouse Hill Town Centre, Mascot Station Precinct, public domain projects, and multi-unit housing projects.

From 2004 to 2007 she was executive director, sustainability at Sydney Olympic Park Authority. Lochhead became deputy government architect in the NSW Government Architect's Office in 2007.

In 2011 Lochhead was appointed an adjunct professor at the University of Sydney School of Architecture, Design and Planning until 2016.

In 2012–2013 Lochhead was executive director, place development, at the Sydney Harbour Foreshore Authority.

Lochhead was appointed the first female dean of the Faculty of Built Environment UNSW in Sydney in 2015 and Pro Vice-Chancellor, Precincts in 2020.

In 2022 she was made an emeritus professor of architecture and urbanism at UNSW Sydney.

== Other roles ==
Lochhead was a nationally elected councillor of the Australian Institute of Architects since 2013 and was the national president from 2019 to 2021. During her term she also served as chair of the board, the 2020 Venice Architecture Biennale (Australian Pavilion) and the Climate Action and Sustainability Taskforce and on the Architecture Foundation board.

She has served on various panels and boards, including the NSW Independent Planning Commission, the Australian Heritage Council, and the National Capital Authority.

In September 2024 she was appointed to serve as member of the Sydney Harbour Federation Trust.

== Recognition and awards ==
- 2024: Officer of the Order of Australia
- 2022: Emeritus Professor in Architecture and Urbanism, UNSW Sydney
- 2020: Royal Institute of British Architects Presidential Medal
- 2020: American Institute of Architects Presidents Medal,
- 2020: Royal Architectural Institute of Canada President's Medal
- 2019: Paula Whitman Leadership in Gender Equity Prize, Australian Institute of Architects (named after architect Paula Whitman)
- 2019:100 Women of Influence, The Australian Financial Review
- 2019: Life Fellow, Australian Institute of Architects
- 2019: RAIA NSW Lloyd Rees Award for Urban Design for Harold Park Precinct, Sydney
- 2019: City of Sydney Lord Mayor's Prize for urban design excellence for Harold Park Precinct, Sydney
- 2016: Fellow, Australian Institute of Company Directors
- 2015: Bogliasco Fellowship, Bogliasco Foundation, Italy
- 2015: AIA Presidents Prize for contribution to the design of the built environment of Sydney, design education and the profession
- 2013/4: Loeb Fellowship, Harvard University Graduate School of Design
- 2013: Lincoln Fellowship, Lincoln Institute of Land Policy, Cambridge
- 2013: Australian Institute of Architects Marion Mahony Griffin Prize (for a distinctive body of work & contribution of a female architect to the profession)
- 2011: AILA National Award for leadership in adaptation to climate change and promotion of sustainable Australian settlements (with OEH)
- 2010: AV Jennings Winston Churchill Fellowship
- 2009: National Association of Women in Construction Vision Award for leadership in the construction industry
- 1996: Landcom Design competition winner
- 1995: Australian Postgraduate Award
- 1993: RAIA Merit Award for Urban Design
- 1991: Byera Hadley Travelling Scholarship, NSW Architects Registration Board
- 1986: William Kinne Fellows Travelling Scholarship, Columbia University, New York
- 1985: Fulbright Fellowship
- 1985: University of Sydney Hezlet Bequest Travelling Scholarship
- 1985: Stephenson Turner Scholarship & Medal
- 1984: NSW Board of Architects Medallion
- 1982: Marten Bequest Travelling Scholarship
