= Grey Room =

- Discipline: Art History and Architecture
- Language: English
- Edited by: Karen Beckman, Branden W. Joseph, Reinhold Martin, Tom McDonough, Felicity D. Scott, Zeynep Çelik Alexander, Lucia Allais, Eric de Bruyn, Gabriella Coleman, Noam M. Elcott, Byron Hamann, John Harwood, and Matthew C. Hunter

Publication details
- History: 2000-present
- Publisher: MIT Press (United States)
- Frequency: Quarterly

Standard abbreviations
- ISO 4: Grey Room

Indexing
- ISSN: 1526-3819 (print); 1536-0105 (web)
- JSTOR: 15263819
- OCLC no.: 47027776

Links
- Journal homepage; Online access

Grey Room is a peer-reviewed academic journal published quarterly, in print and online, by the MIT Press. Founded in 2000, it includes work in the fields of architecture, art, media, and politics. To date it has featured contributions by such prominent historians and theorists as Yve-Alain Bois, Judith Butler, Georges Canguilhem, Jonathan Crary, Hubert Damisch, T. J. Demos, Friedrich Kittler, Chantal Mouffe, Antonio Negri, Jennifer Roberts, Bernhard Siegert, Paolo Virno, Paul Virilio, and Samuel Weber.

Beginning with issue #51, the composition of the editorial board changed. Founding editors Branden W. Joseph, Reinhold Martin, and Felicity D. Scott, and editors Karen Beckman and Tom McDonough, resigned from the editorial board after issue #50 and assumed roles on the advisory board of the journal. Zeynep Çelik Alexander, Lucia Allais, Eric de Bruyn, Gabriella Coleman (since resigned from the editorial board), Noam M. Elcott, John Harwood, Byron Hamann, and Matthew C. Hunter have served as editors since.
