= Linked Town Houses =

Linked town houses is a residential project located at Mackinnon Parade, North Adelaide by architect Robert Dickson, commissioned by June Jacobsen in 1963. Jacobson and her husband, along with another couple, each wanted to build on half the small plot of land that was considered vacant. Through a lengthy process involving the local council, subdivision was approved in May, 1964 that granted two units to be erected at the same time. They were the first town houses to be built in Adelaide. Construction of the houses utilised red brick walling, exposed internally and externally, with concrete floors, exposed timber framework and bound straw sheet ceilings. The pair of houses won the RAIA (SA Chapter) Award of Merit in 1967.
