= Branden W. Joseph =

American art historian

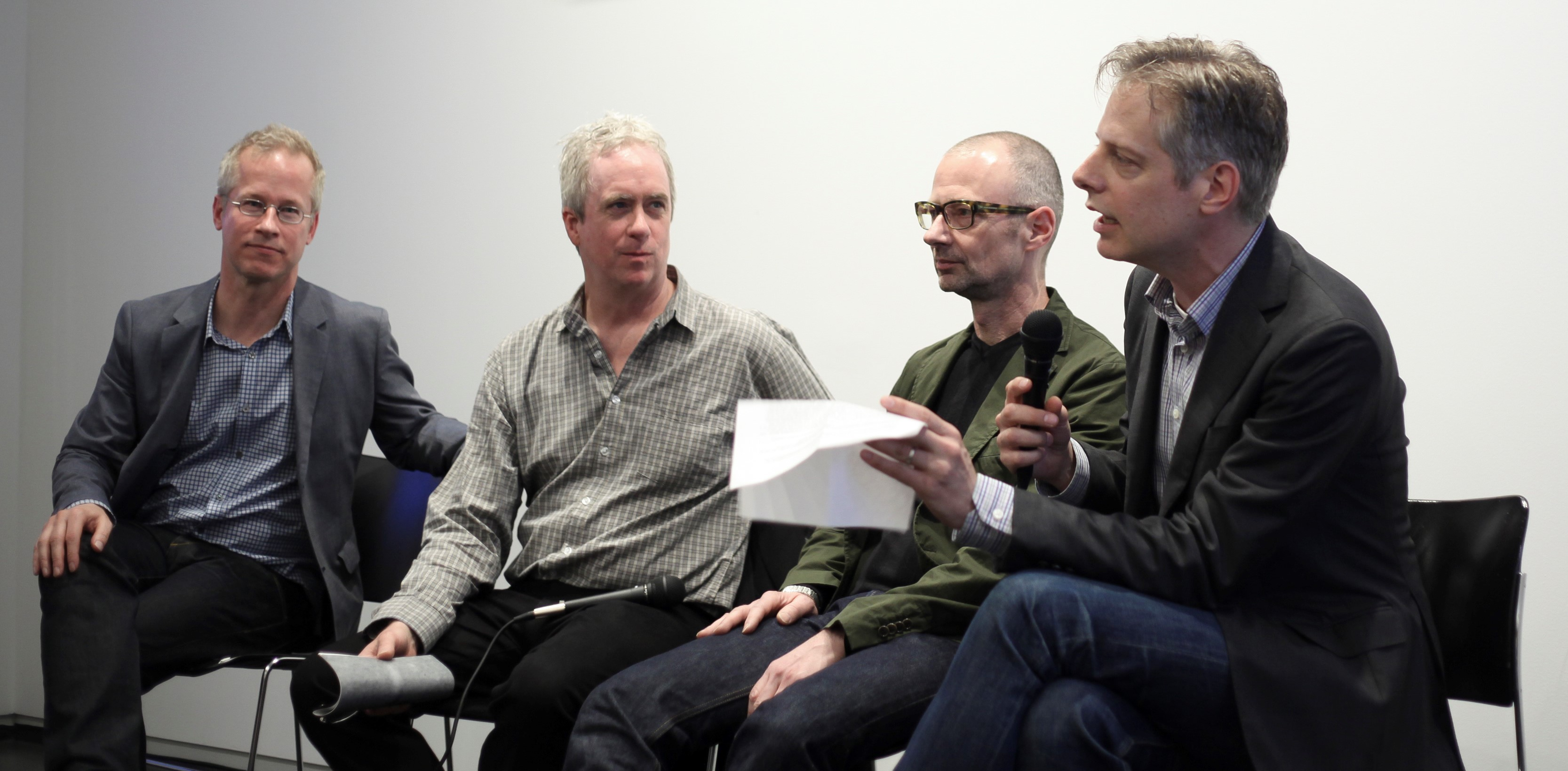
Branden W. Joseph (far right) at the opening of Tony Oursler's exhibition UFOs and Effigies

Branden Wayne Joseph is the Frank Gallipoli Professor of Modern and Contemporary Art in the department of Art History and Archaeology at Columbia University. Prior to coming to Columbia in the fall of 2006, Joseph taught at the University of California, Irvine. He is the author of Random Order: Robert Rauschenberg and the Neo-Avant-Garde, contributing author to Anthony McCall: The Solid Light Films and Related Works and an editor of the journal Grey Room, a multi-disciplinary journal of architecture, art, media and politics. He has published books about Robert Rauschenberg, Andy Warhol, John Cage, Diane Arbus, Buckminster Fuller, Robert Morris, Pat O'Neill, and Anthony McCall. He has a Ph.D. from Harvard University.

== Awards ==
- Coca-Cola Berlin Prize from The American Academy of Berlin
- Paul Mellon Visiting Senior Fellow, Center for Advanced Study in the Visual Arts, 2019.

== Publications ==
- Joseph, Branden Wayne. Anthony McCall: the solid light films and related works, with texts by Branden W. Joseph and Jonathan Walley; edited by Christopher Eamon. Evanston, IL : Northwestern University Press San Francisco, CA: New Art Trust, 2005. 172 p.: ill. (some col.); 29 cm. ISBN 0-8101-2318-5
- Joseph, Branden Wayne. Random order: Robert Rauschenberg and the neo-avant-garde, Branden W. Joseph. Cambridge, Massachusetts: MIT Press, c2003. xiii, 418 p.: ill.; 24 cm. ISBN 0-262-10099-1
- Robert Rauschenberg, edited by Branden W. Joseph; essays by Leo Steinberg ... [et al.]. Cambridge, Massachusetts: MIT Press, c2002. 163 p. : ill.; 24 cm. ISBN 0-262-10096-7
