= Heather Sutherland =

Australian architect

Heather Sutherland (1903–1953) was an Australian architect working pre- and post-World War II in Canberra, the nation's capital. Together with her husband Malcolm Moir she formed the architecture practice, Moir & Sutherland. Their work is considered significant as it represents some of the earliest Canberran examples of 'truly modern design'.

== Biography ==
Heather McDonald Sutherland was born in Sydney on 25 May 1903. After her mother died in 1919, Sutherland's father remarried and from this marriage she had two half-siblings, including the opera singer Joan Sutherland. Sutherland completed high school in Sydney and then enrolled in the University of Sydney's architecture degree, completing her studies in 1926. Post-graduation she worked in the office of Clement Glancey, before marrying Moir in 1936. They eventually formed a partnership, producing works together from the 1930s to the 1950s until Sutherland's death in a car accident in 1953.

== Influence ==
Moir & Sutherland were "prolific" designers during Canberra's inter- and post-war years. Their influential and "radical" functionalist architecture existed in stark contrast to the Spanish Mission, and Georgian and Tudor revival styles that had dominated Canberra's nascent inner suburbs. In recognition of the practice's impact on Canberra architecture, the city's branch of the Australian Institute of Architects named its residential award after the couple.

== List of Works ==
- 3 Wilmot Crescent Forrest, Australian Capital Territory
- 43 Melbourne Avenue Forrest, Australian Capital Territory
- 66 Arthur Circle Forrest, Australian Capital Territory

== See also ==
- Women in architecture
