= Paula Whitman =

Australian architect, academic and writer

Paula Whitman (1960 – 23 October 2006) was an Australian architect, academic, writer, and Australian Institute of Architects chapter president—the first woman to hold the position since its inception in 1888—who made a significant contribution to Australian architectural education, and as an advocate for Australian women in architecture. The Australian Institute of Architects’ Paula Whitman Leadership in Gender Equity Prize is named in her honour.

== Biography ==
Australian by birth, Whitman began studying architecture as an undergraduate at the (then) Queensland Institute of Technology (now, Queensland University of Technology (QUT)). She graduated in 1983; winning the Board of Architects of Queensland Prize, the QIT Medal and the Royal Australian Institute of Architects’ QIA Medallion. Following a decade in architectural practice, Whitman returned to study a Masters in Architecture, and was appointed a lecturer at QUT in 1993. She remained there throughout her academic career.

Whitman was also a member of the Australian Institute of Architects until her death in 2006.

== Professional career ==
Whitman contributed to popular media publications, academic journals, industry reports, and conferences; and also sat on numerous architectural juries.

Whitman was also a member of the National Association of Women in Construction, and awarded the 2004 Year of the Built Environment Award in recognition of her significant efforts to improve the place of women in architecture.

Her landmark comprehensive study, Going Places: The Career Progression of Women in the Architectural Profession - Findings of a National Study Examining the Careers of Women in the Architectural Profession in Australia, connected the lack of workplace policies and flexible working arrangements as a key obstacle for women contributing to Australian architectural practice as early as 2005. The study grew out of Whitman's realisation in 2002 that though nearly half of al architecture students and graduates in Australia were women, only 16% of registered architects across the country were female. Whitman's report and recommendations were key to the emergence of another significant Australian gender research project – Equity and Diversity in the Australian Architecture Profession: Women, Work and Leadership – as it became clear that those strategies had failed to be taken up by industry nearly 10 years later.

Adept at working across academic research and architectural practice, she was also known for her care and support of graduate students, and women architects in the profession more generally.

In 2016, ten years after her death, she was recognised posthumously with the Australian Institute of Architects Paula Whitman Leadership in Gender Equity Prize—a prize established to acknowledge “exceptional leadership and outstanding contribution to the advancement of gender equity in architectural practice, education and governance”.

== Selected publications ==
- Going Places: The Career Progression of Women in Architecture. Queensland University of Technology. 2005.
- “Minimal Means.” Architecture Australia, Vol 94, No 2, 2005: 78–81.
- “Going Places: How Do Women Fare in Architecture? Going Places, Paula Whitman’s Survey on Women’s Career Progression in the Profession, Frames the Issues and Outlines a Series of Recommendations. Architecture Australia Asked a Range of Women--of Different Ages, Locations and Practice Backgrounds--to Respond to the Findings, Contemplate the Issues and Suggest Ways Forward.” Architecture Australia. No 1, 2006: 47.
- (editor, with Louise Wallis and Susan Savage), Collaboration & Coalition : Creating Architectural Knowledge in Contemporary Practice. Canberra : Royal Australian Institute of Architects, 2004

== Personal life ==
On 23 October 2006, Whitman succumbed to a long battle with cancer. She is survived by her partner, architect John Deicke, and two children, William and Charlie.
