= Australian Civic Trust =

Australian urban design organisation

The Australian Civic Trust (ACT), formerly known as the Civic Trust of South Australia, is or was an Australian organisation promoting excellence in urban design. It was responsible for organising the Civic Trust Awards, last awarded in 2019. (Note: Not to be confused with the British Civic Trust Awards.)

== History ==
=== Background ===
A 1967 symposium of the South Australian branch of the RAIA was known as the "Outrage Symposium" followed Australian architect Don Gazzard's speech and publication entitled Australian Outrage (1966). Gazzard had adopted the term used by British architectural critic Ian Nairn's critique of urban design entitled Outrage, and followed Australian architect Robin Boyd's criticism of Australian design in his book The Australian Ugliness (1960). At the Outrage Symposium, a steering committee was set up to establish a new body focused on urban design in South Australia. This committee first met on 6 October 1967, and decided to found a scheme based on the UK Civic Trust Awards.

=== Civic Trust history ===
The Civic Trust of South Australia Inc. was established in 1969, and became incorporated in 1992 or 1993. It published under the name Civic Trust Inc. from 2005 to April 2007, with a name change to Australian Civic Trust Inc. by the December 2007.

In 2014, the Civic Trust called for the establishment of a social history museum on the site of the former Royal Adelaide Hospital site (now Lot Fourteen).

== Description ==
The Australian Civic Trust (ACT) supports civic issues relating to urban design, including heritage issues and management of water resources. It sees social, environmental, and urban issues as all parts of a whole. It engages with the public to discuss such issues, and also collaborates with other groups, including government, in areas of great concern to the community.

== People ==
Gordon Young was chairman of the Civic Trust of South Australia during the 1970s or 1980s. Michael Lennon, later chair of the State Planning Commission, spent two stints as chair.

Darian Hiles, who was chair in 2014, was chair of the association and convenor of the awards in 2019. Hiles maintains registration of the trust as a South Australian Incorporated Association (registration A3514).

== Awards ==
The Australian Civic Trust organises Civic Trust Awards to recognise projects that demonstrate "innovation and public value", as well as "brickbats". Members of the public submit nominations for both categories.

In the 1990s, the awards were known as Civic Trust Awards. At some point before 2015, after the name change to Australian Civic Trust, they changed to various named awards.

Special awards given in the late 2010s include:

- Colonel William Light Award for Excellence in Urban Design (after William Light, who planned the city of Adelaide)
- Stuart Hart Award for City and Regional Planning
- Australian Civic Trust Award for Raising the Profile of the Arts and Tourism
- Hugh Stretton Award for Innovation in Residential Development (after historian Hugh Stretton)
- Australian Civic Trust Award for Political Reform
- Ian Macdonald Award for Best in the Urban Category
- Bob Such Award for Design for Social Benefit (after SA politician Bob Such)

In 2019, there was also a Heritage Award, and the Silo Art Award category proved very popular.

As of 2024, the last "Awards & Brickbats" were presented on 13 November 2019.

=== Some award-winners ===
==== 1993 ====
- Swanbury Penglase Architects: Civic Trust Award, for the CSIRO Building in Kintore Avenue, Adelaide
- Swanbury Penglase Architects: Civic Trust Award, for ANZ Bank building in Gawler

==== 1994 ====
- Shannon Architects: Award of Merit – Recycling, for Noarlunga Community Arts Centre

==== 1996 ====
- Shannon Architects: Award of Merit – Buildings in their settings, for Australian Arid Lands Botanic Garden

==== 2015 ====
- Swanbury Penglase Architects: Australian Civic Trust Colonel William Light Award for Excellence in Design, for Conservation of Elder Park Rotunda

==== 2018 ====
- Swanbury Penglase Architects: Australian Civic Trust Colonel William Light Award for Excellence in Design, for work on the Queen Adelaide Room at Adelaide Town Hall

==== 2019 ====
- Smyth Chapel at West Terrace Cemetery: Bob Such Award for Design for Social Benefit
