= Redesign My Brain =

Australian television series

- DVD cover of the first season
- Genre: Documentary
- Starring: Todd Sampson
- Narrated by: Todd Sampson
- Composer: Michael Allen
- Country of origin: Australia
- Original language: English
- No. of seasons: 2
- No. of episodes: 6

Production
- Executive producer: Paul Scott
- Producers: Tim Clark; Isabel Perez
- Cinematography: Toby Ralph
- Editor: Philippa Rowlands
- Running time: 57-58 minutes
- Production companies: Screen Australia; Mindful Media

Original release
- Network: ABC Australia
- Release: October 10, 2013 – June 11, 2015

Redesign My Brain is an Australian TV series presented by and starring Todd Sampson. It follows Sampson in his quest to expand the boundaries of his brain. It is currently aired on ABC Australia. Six episodes have been produced so far. It won the AACTA Award for Best Documentary Television Program and the ATOM Awards for Best Factual Television Series and Best Documentary – Science, Technology & the Environment.

== Episode list ==
=== Season 1 (2013) ===
No. overall	No. in season	Title	Original release date
1	1	"Make Me Smarter"	October 10, 2013
A pioneer in the neuroplasticity revolution, Michael Merzenich, mentors Todd, showing him how to radically improve his cognition by turbo charging his thinking speed, attention, peripheral vision, and memory. He learns to juggle and memorize cards. After a month of training one hour per day, he can juggle three clubs, his reaction time has reduced from 0.9 seconds to 0.5 seconds with an accuracy increase from 62% to 98%, and his attentional blink test accuracy increased from 64% to 95%. Merzenich says Todd's brain is "responding about as fast as it humanly possible to respond". He goes on to represents Australia at the 2013 London World Memory Championship, where he succeeds in memorizing a complete deck of cards. At the end of the episode, he reports feeling great, and sleeping better.
2	2	"Make Me Creative"	October 17, 2013
Todd tests his creativity, then trains for one hour per day to be more creative, innovative and to think more laterally, before attempting a creative art challenge at the end of the month. He visits creativity researcher James C. Kaufman at California State University, San Bernardino and takes several divergent thinking tests including the alternate uses test, and a Torrance drawing test. His goal is to change his mindset, and improve everyday problem solving by overcoming functional fixedness. Kaufman instructs him to try a new food every day, find new routes in his daily errands, and use his non-dominant hand. Next, he learns about the Remote Associates Test, insight, and optical illusions such as the Ames room. Back in Australia, he meets creativity and innovation expert David Cropley, who teaches him to view objects in terms of functional descriptions as a method for innovation (a screwdriver "applies torque", and so do other objects). Next, he meets artist Janet Echelman in preparation for his art challenge. Back in Australia, Centre for the Mind at the University of Sydney Allan Snyder exposes him to transcranial direct-current stimulation to temporarily inhibit a certain area of his brain to stimulate lateral thinking. At the RMIT Design Hub in Melbourne, he learns about the Six Thinking Hats method. At the end of the episode, Todd finds that his creativity score increased from 45% to 75%. For his final art challenge, Todd and a collaborator install a large canvas art piece in hangar, mirroring its roof.
3	3	"Mind Over Matter"	October 24, 2013
Todd, who can't swim, faces his greatest fear - being chained, handcuffed and blindfolded underwater with only his radically improved brain to help him escape. In preparation, he gets tested at the Australian Institute of Sport, and meets with clearance divers, escape artist Alexanderia the Great in Boston, and freediver Ant Williams in Melbourne. In San Francisco, he meets with Tan Le, co-founder of wearable neuroheadset maker Emotiv, and learns to control objects with the headset by focusing his thoughts. In the meantime, he visualizes throwing darts with his non-dominant hand, and nearly doubles his accuracy by the end of the episode. His results on the Stroop test and emotional intelligence tests increase, as well as his ability to hold his breath, from 30 seconds to over 2 minutes during his final escape. The season concludes with Prof. Merzenich highlighting the revolutionary potential of brain plasticity as a corrective tool for ADHD, obsessive–compulsive disorder, autism, and other mental disorders.

=== Season 2 (2015) ===
No. overall	No. in season	Title	Original release date
4	1	"Help Me Adapt"	May 22, 2015
Todd uses the latest science to train his brain to become more adaptable. To prove that it's possible, he risks his life rock climbing blindfolded up a 120m rock face in Utah's Moab Desert.
5	2	"Sharpen My Senses"	June 4, 2015
Todd pushes his senses to the limits to unleash his brain's full potential.
6	3	"Make Me Brave"	June 11, 2015
To prove that brain training can overcome fear, Todd uses all his previous brain training to face his fears and achieve the ultimate challenge - a skywalk between two buildings 21 floors high.

== Awards ==
Award	Category	Recipients	Result	Ref.
3rd AACTA Awards	Best Documentary Television Program	Redesign My Brain	Won	
3rd AACTA Awards	Best Editing in a Documentary	Philippa Rowlands	Nominated	
ATOM Awards	Best Factual Television Series	Redesign My Brain	Won	
ATOM Awards	Best Documentary – Science, Technology & the Environment	Redesign My Brain	Won	

== International broadcast ==
- India — Discovery Channel India has broadcast the show in India.
- Spain - La 2 is currently (may 2020) airing the series.
