= The Hosteller =

- Type: Privately held company
- Industry: Hospitality
- Founded: 2015
- Headquarters: Mumbai, India
- Website: thehosteller.com

The Hosteller is an Indian hostel chain that operates a chain of backpacker hostels, having its headquarters in Mumbai, India. It was founded in 2015, in Mumbai, with its first hostel opening in Jaipur, Rajasthan.

It provides dormitory stays and private room accommodation for guests. As of 2026, the company operates 72 properties across more than 50 destinations in India.

== History ==
The Hosteller was founded in 2015 by Pranav Dangi. The concept originated during his student exchange programme in Europe in 2013, in the course of which he stayed in backpacker hostels across a number of countries and identified the absence of organised backpacker hostels in the country.

It officially began operations in early 2015, with its first hostel opening in Jaipur, Rajasthan and grew to having 3 such hostels in less than a year. During the early launch of the company, It focused on backpacker hostel accommodation for travellers specially in the northern part of India along with providing communal areas and activities for guests.

In 2020, the COVID-19 pandemic disrupted the company's operations and travel demand, resulting in financial losses. Following the reopening of its properties in August 2020, the company reported occupancy rates exceeding 80% at several of its hostels during the subsequent recovery period. During the pandemic, the company introduced workation and co-living offerings to accommodate longer stays and changes in travel patterns. The company eventually expanded beyond northern India into southern and western regions, including major cities and tourist destinations, as well as smaller destinations, with over 55 hostels.

In November 2021, The Hosteller raised US$1 million in a pre-Series A funding round led by multiple angel investors, including FAO Ventures, Alpha Assets, etc., with participation from other investors.

The company eventually expanded beyond northern India into southern and western regions, including major cities and tourist destinations, as well as smaller destinations, with over 55 hostels.

In November 2024, the company raised ₹48 crore in a Series A round. The round comprised equity funding and ₹16 crore in venture debt.

In April 2026, The Hosteller raised ₹150 crore in a Series B funding round led by, with participation from ITI Growth Opportunities Fund, Merisis Wealth Trust and family offices. It was described by The Economic Times as the largest institutional funding round raised by a backpacker hostel company in India. By the same year, The Hosteller had expanded to 75 properties across 50 destinations.

== Operations ==
The Hosteller operates accommodation primarily in the backpacker and budget-hospitality segment. Its properties offer shared dormitories and private rooms, together with communal areas and facilities intended for social interaction. The company also operates food and beverage services under the Myngl brand and offers activities and experiences at selected properties.

The Hosteller follows an asset-light model and does not own the properties in which its hostels operate, using revenue-sharing arrangements with property owners, while also operating through fixed-rental agreements.
