= Emotive =

Emotive may refer to:

- Emotive (sociology), a sociological term
- eMOTIVe, a 2004 rock album by A Perfect Circle
- Emotiv, a company which develops mind-computer interfaces
