= Short break =

A short break a common term for a short vacation or holiday. Other terms for a short break are short holiday, short holiday break, short break holiday, and bargain break. A definition of short break has not been universally agreed upon. Beginning in the 1940s, short holidays were referred to as getaways mainly for leisure that last no more than three nights. The scholar David E. Edgar wrote in 2003 that sources have generally set short breaks as having this time frame. He said that lately, sources have used the standard of a short break ranging from one to either four or five nights.

The phrase "short break" is well-established in the language of the tourism sector. Mass media and the trade press routinely publish articles about the short break. According to the scholar Steven Pike in 2021, short breaks gained prominence recently in Australasia, Europe, North America, and the United Kingdom as a key pattern in vacationing.
