= MPavilion =

Coordinates: 37°49′18.6″S 144°58′13.7″E

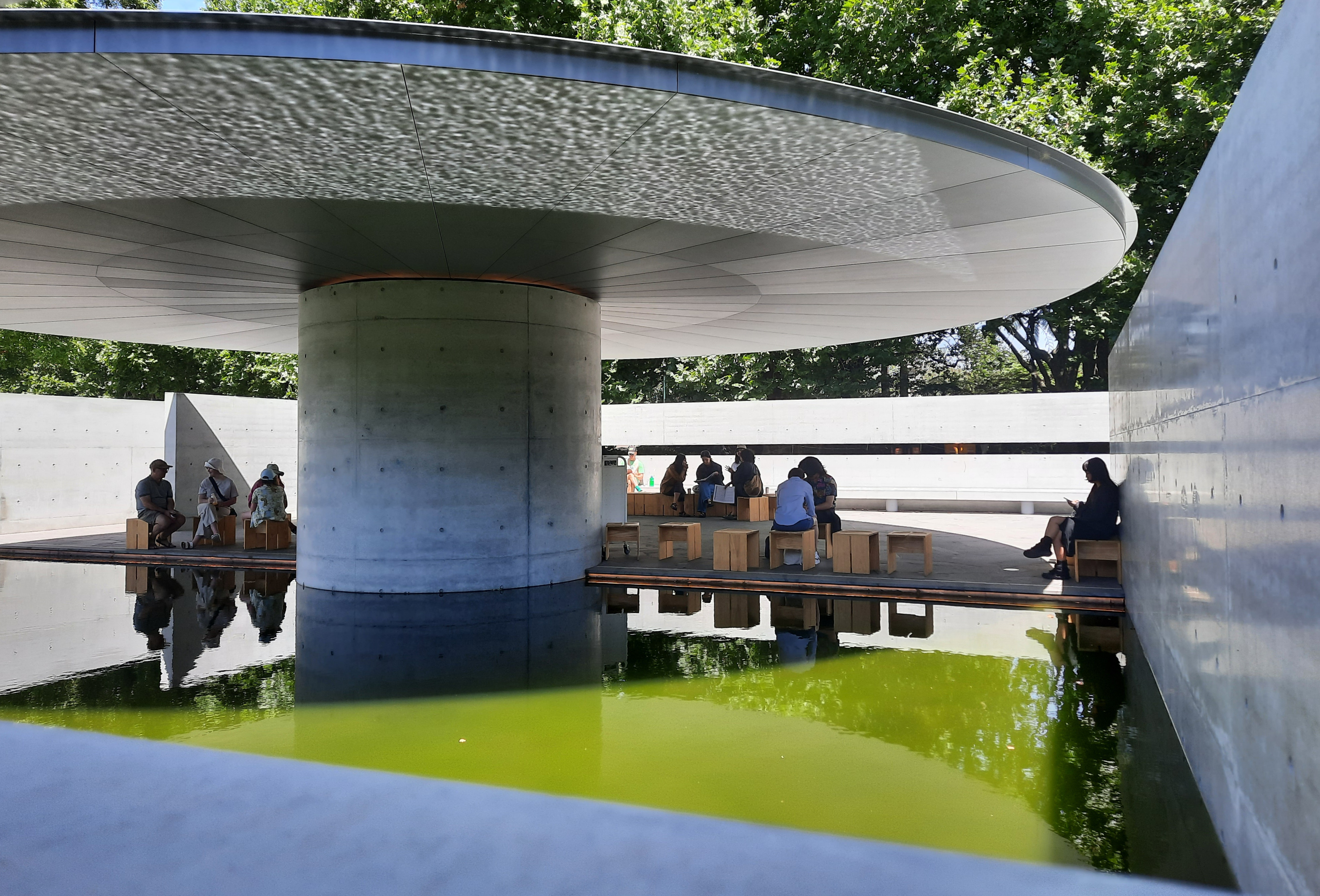
- Interactive map of the MPavilion area

General information
- Location: Queen Victoria Gardens, St Kilda Road, Melbourne
- Year built: 2014—2023
- Opened: 7 October 2014
- Owner: Naomi Milgrom Foundation

Technical details
- Size: 350m^{2}
- Floor count: 1

Design and construction
- Architect: Tadao Ando 2023

Website
- mpavilion.org

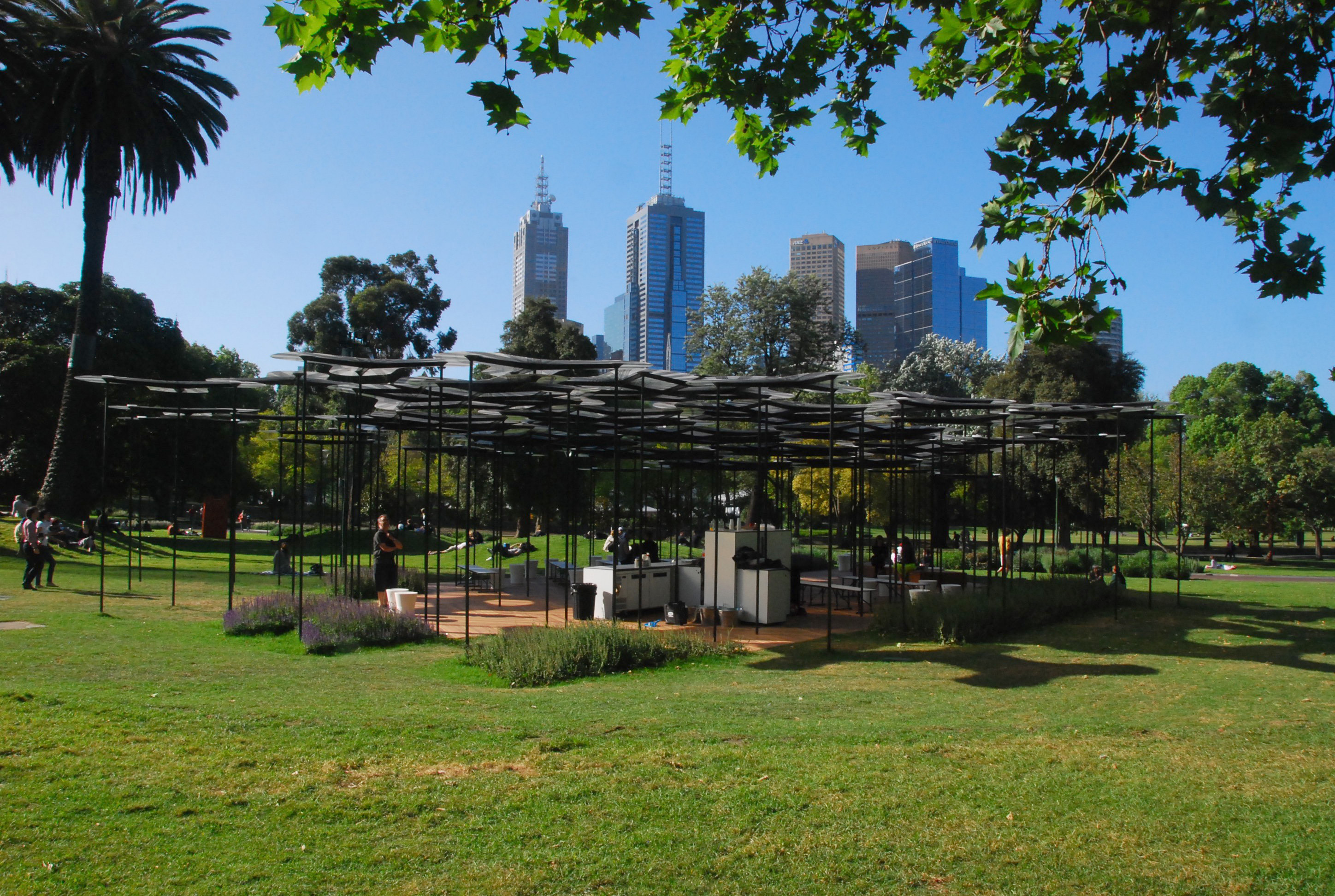
The 2015 MPavilion by Amanda Levete

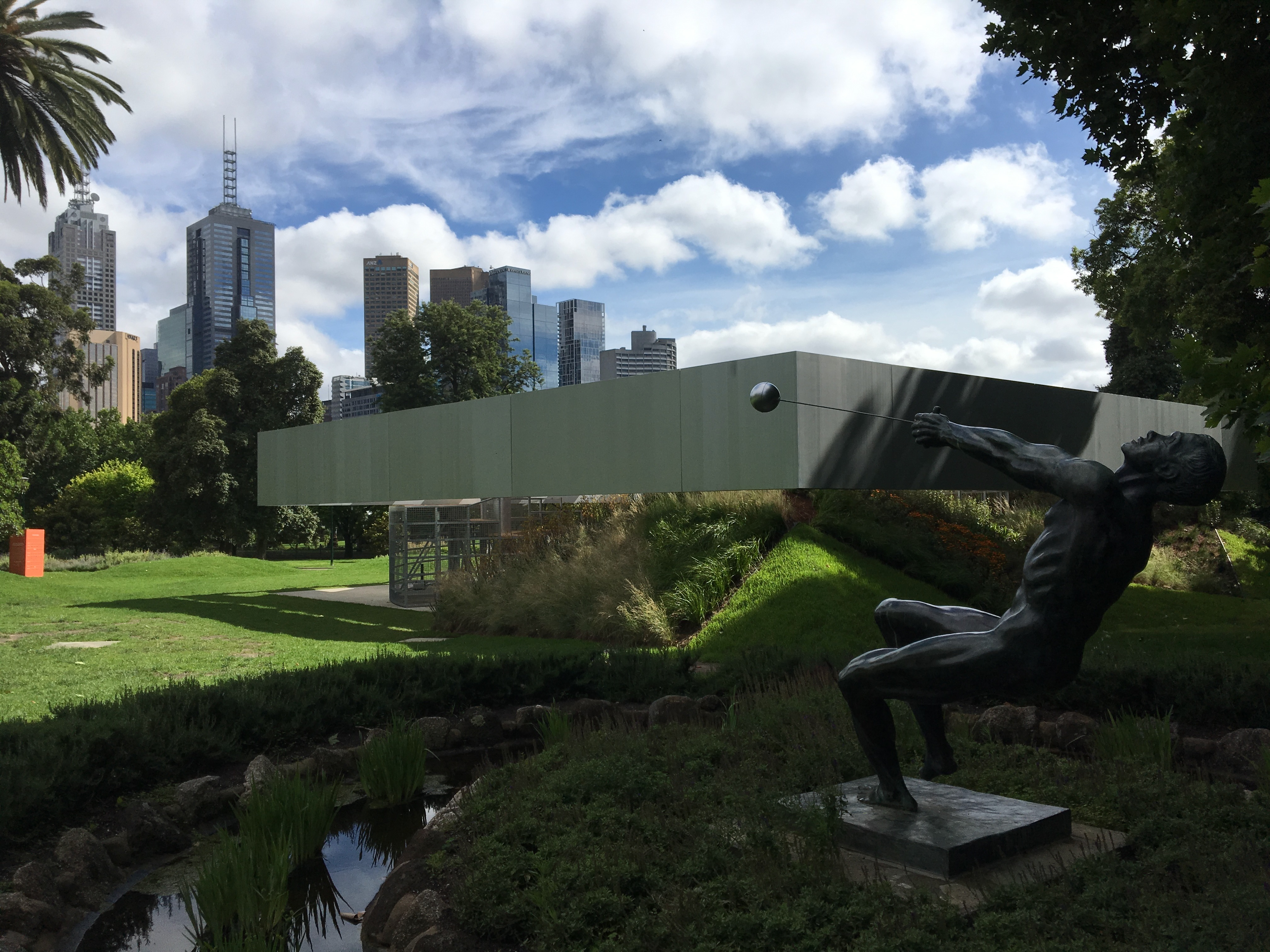
The 2017 MPavilion by Rem Koolhaas and David Gianotten

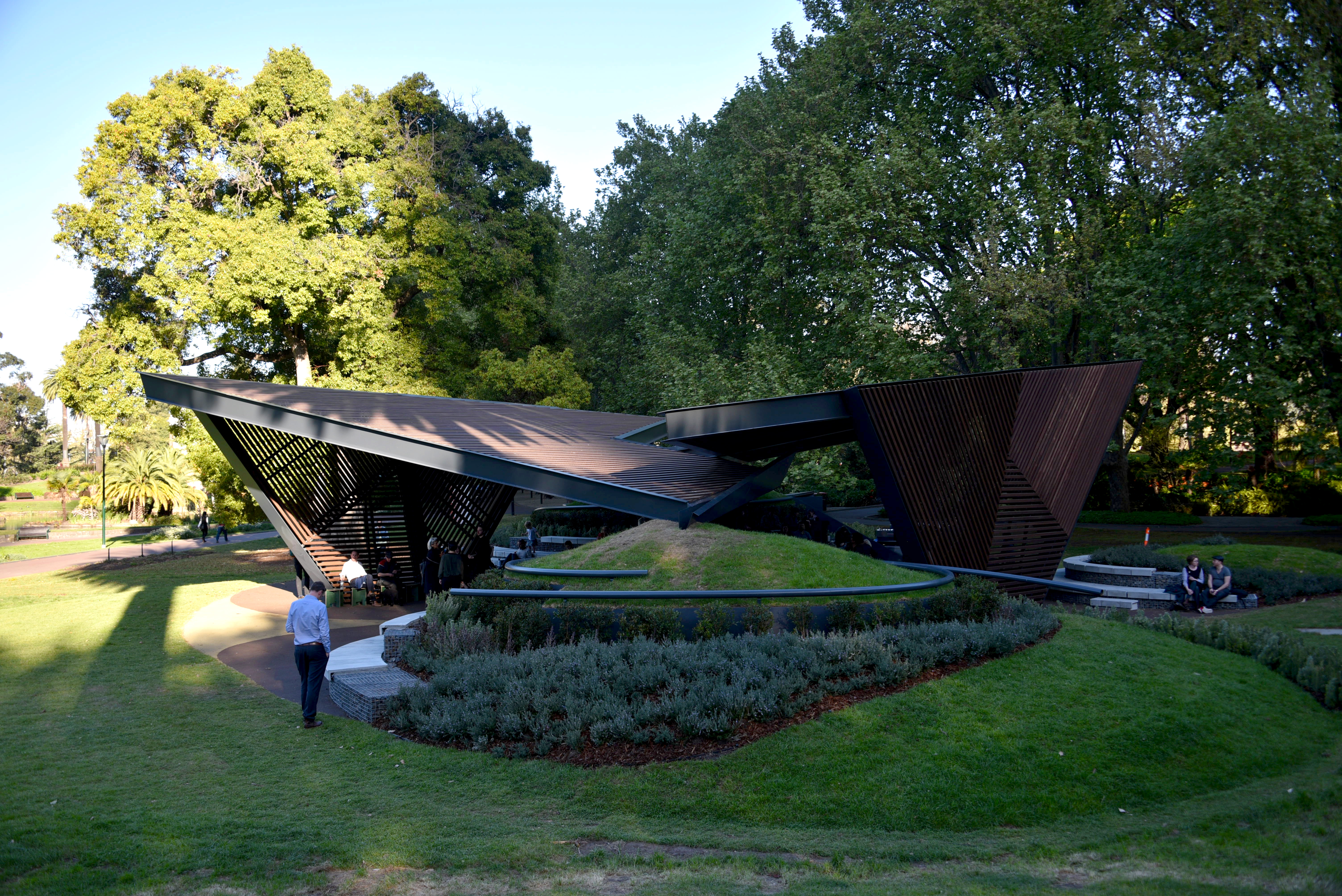
The 2018 MPavilion by Carme Pinós

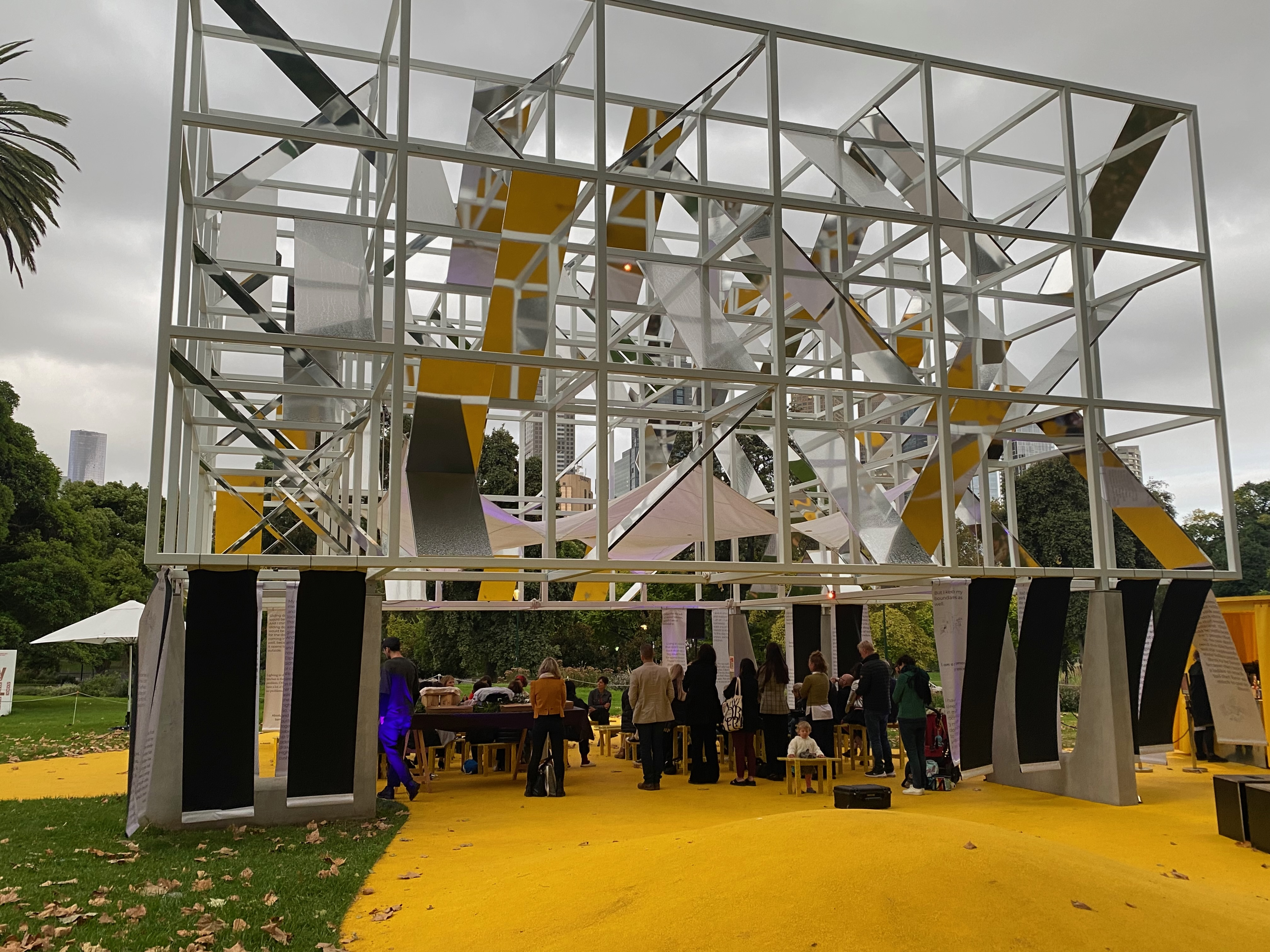
The 2021 MPavilion by MAP Studio

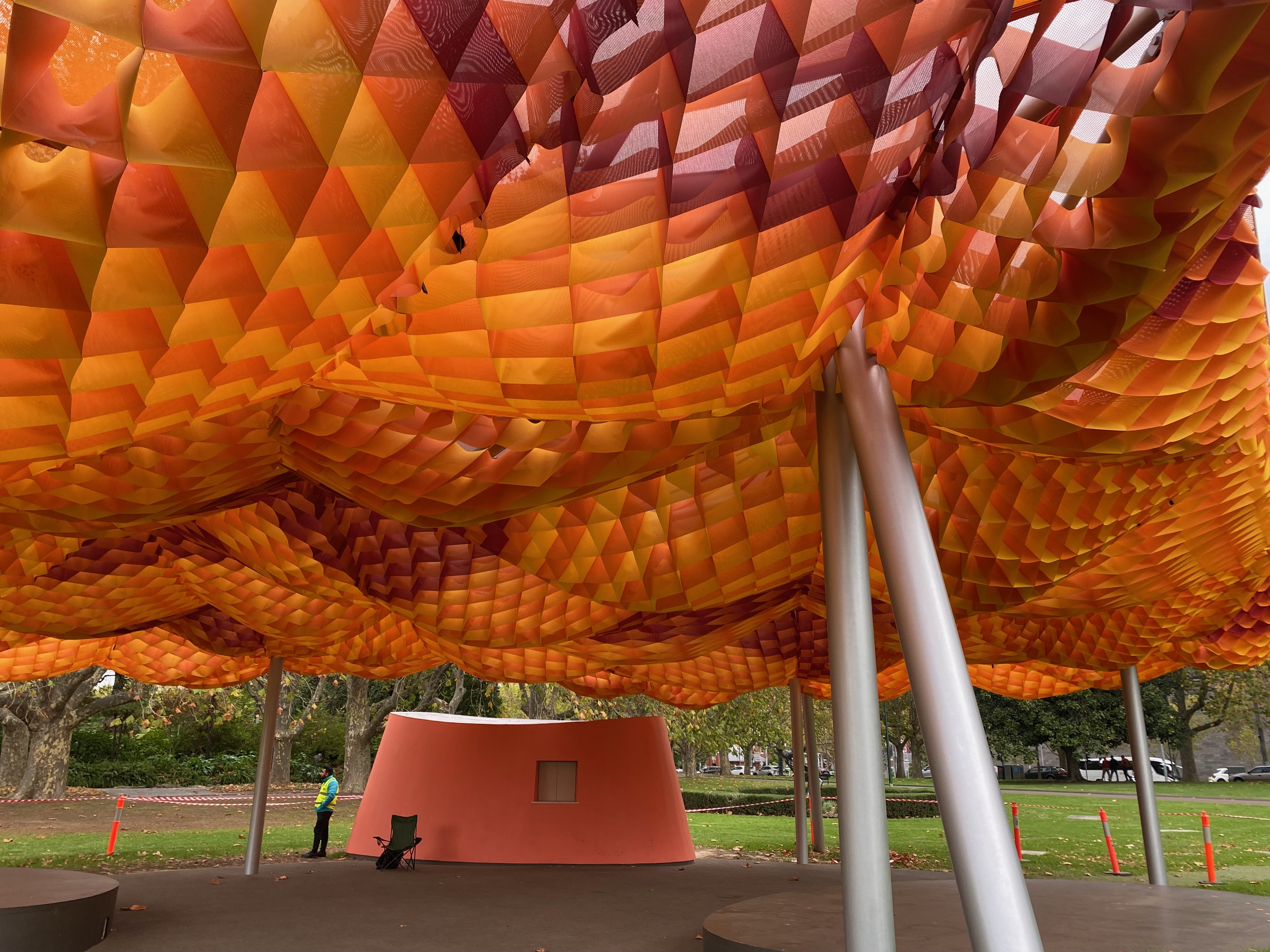
The 2022 MPavilion by all(zone), Rachaporn Choochuey

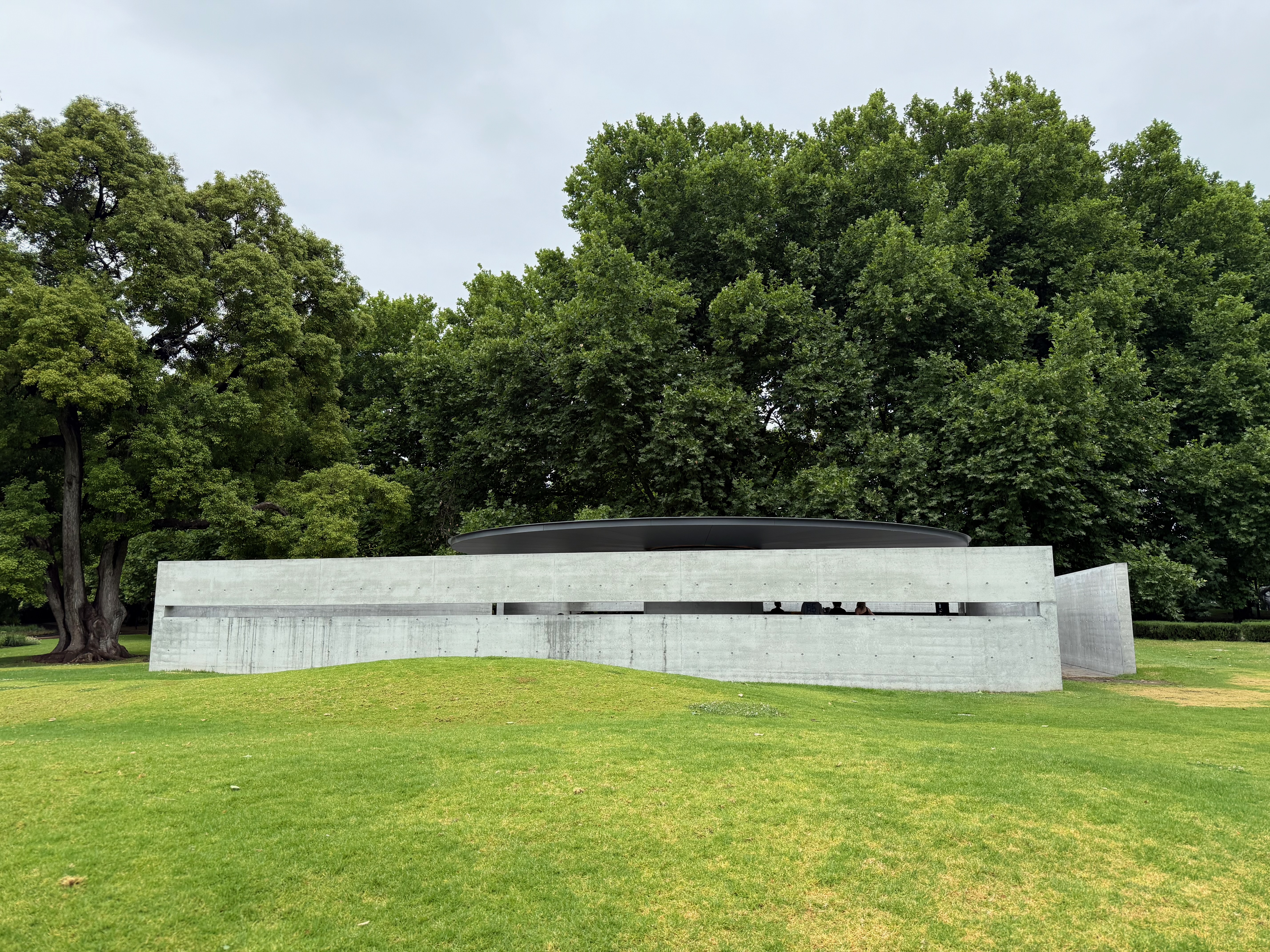
The 2023 MPavilion by Tadao Ando

MPavilion was a series of temporary pavilions installed in Queen Victoria Gardens, Melbourne, on nine occasions by nine different architects between 2014 and 2023. The final project by Tadao Ando opened in 2023 has remained in the gardens. The project, construction and associated events were sponsored by Melbourne based philanthropist Naomi Milgrom.

== Background ==
Initially the project was planned for four years, but later it was extended by another two, until 2019, and then another three years to 2023. No pavilion was constructed in 2020 due to the COVID-19 pandemic. The pavilions were used for various art events and talks, after which each pavilion was gifted to the city, institution or university and relocated to a new permanent location.

== Pavilions ==
The first pavilion was designed by Sean Godsell, and was later relocated to the Hellenic Museum. The second pavilion was designed by UK-based architect Amanda Levete in 2015, and later relocated to Docklands. The third pavilion was a bamboo structure designed by Bijoy Jain of Studio Mumbai, later relocated to the Melbourne Zoo. In 2017, the pavilion was designed by Rem Koolhaas and David Gianotten, and is OMA's first completed design in Australia. It has been relocated to the Clayton campus of Monash University. The 2018 pavilion was designed by Spanish architect Carme Pinós. The architect of the 2019 pavilion was Glenn Murcutt

== List of pavilion architects by year ==
Year	Architect	Country	Relocation	Dates and notes
2014	Sean Godsell Architects	Australia	Hellenic Museum, 280 William Street, Melbourne	7 October 2014—1 February 2015: Small Project Architecture Award, Victorian Chapter AIA, 2015
2015	Amanda Levete (A_LA)	London, United Kingdom	770 Collins Street, Docklands	6 October 2015—7 February 2016
2016	Bijoy Jain (Studio Mumbai)	Mumbai, India	Melbourne Zoo, Parkville	5 October 2016–18 February 2017; Bamboo structure
2017	Rem Koolhaas and David Gianotten	Netherlands	Monash University, Clayton Campus, 26 Ancora Imparo Way, Clayton	3 October 2017—4 February 2018; OMA's first completed design in Australia
2018	Carme Pinós, Estudio Carme Pinós	Spain	Monash University, Peninsula Campus	9 October 2018–17 February 2019
2019	Glenn Murcutt	Sydney, Australia	University Square, University of Melbourne, 190-192 Pelham Street, Carlton	14 November 2019—22 March 2020
2020	No event			No pavilion built or events in 2020 due to COVID-19 pandemic.
2021	MAP Studio (Francesco Magnani and Traudy Pelzel)	Venice, Italy	In storage	2 December 2021–24 April 2022
2022	all(zone) / Rachaporn Choochuey	Bangkok, Thailand	RMIT University, Brunswick Campus, 25 Dawson Street, Brunswick	17 November 2022—6 April 2023
2023	Tadao Ando	Japan	Permanent from November 2023 until 2030, Queen Victoria Gardens	Event seasons: 16 November 2023–28 March 2024, 21 November 2024–22 March 2025

== Recognition and awards ==
Naomi Milgrom was presented with the 2015 President's Prize from the Victorian Chapter of the Australian Institute of Architects for the two MPavilion projects built and talk programs.

“MPavilion is a brave and audacious project, involving the commissioning of architects of excellence and the support of a dense program of free public events. The MPavilion program is helping to position Melbourne as a key design centre in the Asia-Pacific Region and is the most publicly visited design exhibition in Australia. The two commissions to date by Sean Godsell and Amanda Levete have both been proactive and sensual projects, a credit to Naomi’s awareness of excellence in contemporary design and her renowned ability to get things done. I congratulate Naomi on her commitment to excellence in architecture, her public philanthropy and her personal facilitation of this outstanding public program”. — AIA President's citation

In 2015 Sean Godsell's pavilion was awarded a Small Project Architecture Award at the Victorian Chapter Australian Institute of Architects awards.

In May 2024 Naomi Milgrom was presented with the 2024 National President's Prize of Australian Institute of Architects for her philanthropy, advocacy and the MPavilion Program.

== See also ==
- Serpentine Galleries#Pavilions
