= Todd Sampson =

Australian television personality (b. 1970)

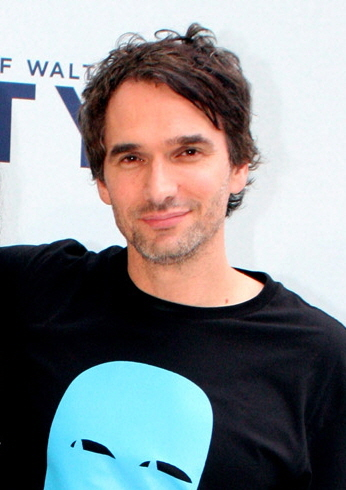
- Born: 1970 (age 55–56); Sydney, Nova Scotia, Canada
- Education: B.A. (Queen's University); M.B.A. (Cape Town University)
- Occupations: TV Presenter; Documentarian; Advertising executive
- Television: Gruen; Redesign My Brain; Todd Sampson's Body Hack; Life on the Line
- Movement: Earth Hour
- Board member of: Fairfax Media
- Spouse: Neomie Sampson
- Children: 2
- Awards: CEO of the Year; Rose d'Or; AACTA for Best Documentary of the Year
- Website: toddsampson.com.au

Todd Sampson is a Canadian-born Australian award-winning documentary-maker and television presenter. Prior to his public career, Sampson worked as an advertising executive and from 2015 to 2025 sat on the Qantas board. He is best known for being a regular panellist on marketing discussion program Gruen, and has also been a guest host on The Project. His choice of T-shirts have sparked discussions following his appearances on Gruen. Sampson has also created and presented several science documentary series.

== Early life and education ==
Sampson was born in Sydney, Nova Scotia, Canada. He left Cape Breton Island at age 16, completing his schooling at the Pearson United World College of the Pacific, to which he won a CA$30,000 scholarship. He then studied economics and biology at Queen's University in Ontario, working as a college counsellor to supplement his income. He applied for another international scholarship and went on to complete an M.B.A. at the University of Cape Town. He credits a guest lecturer–a creative director from advertising agency Ogilvie & Mather–during his MBA for inspiring him to pursue a career in advertising.

== Business career ==
Sampson started in advertising at the Cape Town agency The White House. In the mid-1990s, he worked as a strategist at Australian company The Campaign Palace. He joined Leo Burnett Sydney in 2002 and was later appointed CEO of Leo Burnett Australia. In August 2015, Sampson stepped back to the role of non-executive chairman. In December 2016, he resigned as chair of Leo Burnett and is no longer a part of the advertising industry.

He is the co-creator of the Earth Hour initiative, one of the largest environmental movements in history, reaching more than 1.4 billion people in more than 5,500 cities.

In 2014, Sampson was appointed to the board of directors of Fairfax Media, a 2.5-billion-dollar multi-platform media company in Australasia.

Effective February 2015, Sampson joined the Qantas board of directors as a non-executive director. His 9-year tenure on the board has recently been called into question with sentiments on Qantas being at an all-time low.

On 31 March 2025 it was revealed that Sampson had resigned from the Qantas board.

== Television career ==
Sampson is a regular panellist on the ABC television media review program Gruen. He sometimes appeared as a panellist and guest host on Network Ten's The Project.

In October 2013, he was the subject of a science documentary series, Redesign My Brain. The documentary won the 2014 AACTA Award for Best Documentary Television Program.

Sampson has also written and hosted an adventure science series for Discovery International and Network 10 called Todd Sampson's Body Hack. Body Hack was nominated for two Logie Awards – Best Factual Series and Most Outstanding Documentary Series. Sampson also acted a small part as Provost in the Oscar-nominated feature film Lion. In early 2017, Sampson hosted an ABC Science documentary called Life on the Line.

In 2021, the two-part documentary series Mirror, Mirror, created and written by Sampson, screened on Network Ten. The documentary explored the crisis of body image dissatisfaction in society and the manipulative trillion-dollar industry that profits from it. A second season explores how the internet is changing society and what people can do about it.

In 2025, Sampson starred in a TV series titled Todd Sampson's Why? on the ABC. The show explores different ways of thinking and questions why people think the way they do.

== Personal life ==
Sampson has lived in Bondi since arriving in Australia and renovated a house in Vaucluse in 2020. He is married to Neomie Sampson, who he first met at a work function in the 1990s, before a chance encounter in the early 2000s. The couple has two daughters, Coco and Jet. Sampson is an adventurer, having completed an unguided ascent to the top of Mount Everest.

== Awards ==
The Australian Financial Review and News Limited ranked him as one of the most influential executives in Australia. He has won a CEO of the Year Award twice and has featured on the cover of BRW magazine. He was ranked as one of the most influential men under 45 by Men's Style and was nominated for GQ's Man of the Year Award.

An art piece by Michelle St Anne called I Love Todd Sampson – Voices of the Vulnerable was performed at Walsh Bay in February and March 2013.
