= Todd Sampson's Body Hack =

Australian documentary TV series

- Genre: Documentary
- Written by: Jeff Siberry; Todd Sampson
- Directed by: Jeff Siberry
- Presented by: Todd Sampson
- Composer: Brett Aplin
- Country of origin: Australia
- Original language: English
- No. of seasons: 4
- No. of episodes: 17

Production
- Executive producers: Todd Sampson; Chris Hilton; Alan Erson; David Alrich
- Producers: Aline Jacques; Denise Anderson; Chris Thorburn
- Running time: 60 minutes

Original release
- Network: Network Ten
- Release: 4 October 2016 – 29 September 2020

Todd Sampson's Body Hack (also known as Body Hack) is an Australian documentary television series which first premiered on 4 October 2016 on Network Ten.

The series was renewed for a second season in November 2016 which was set to air in 2017, however the series aired in 2018 and was titled Todd Sampson's Body Hack 2.0.

A third season was officially renewed by Network 10 in November 2018 and premiered on 25 June 2019 at 8:40 pm.

Season four commenced on Tuesday, 15 September 2020.

== Broadcast ==
The series first premiered on Tuesday, 4 October 2016 at 9:00pm. The second season premiered on Thursday, 31 May 2018 at 8:45pm. The third season premiered on Tuesday, 25 June 2019 at 8:40pm. The fourth season premiered on Tuesday, September 15, 2020 at 7:30pm.

== Synopsis ==
Filmed around the world over a period of six months, Todd embarks on a journey to investigate some of the world's most extraordinary people. He deconstructs and decodes how they people live, what they do differently, and how this impacts the human body.

== Series overview ==
Season	Timeslot	No. of episodes	Original airdate		DVD Release
Season	Timeslot	No. of episodes	Series premiere	Series finale	Region 4
1	Tuesday 9:00 pm	6	4 October 2016	8 November 2016	7 December 2016
2	Thursday 8:45 pm	6	31 May 2018	12 July 2018	4 July 2018
3	Tuesday 8:40 pm	4	25 June 2019	16 July 2019	—N/a
4	Tuesday 7:30 pm Tuesday 8:40 pm	3	15 September 2020	29 September 2020	—N/a

== Episodes ==
=== Season 1 (2016) ===
No.	Title	Original release date	Australian viewers
1	"MMA Fighter"	4 October 2016	641,000
2	"Hunter Gatherer"	11 October 2016	543,000
3	"French Foreign Legion"	18 October 2016	660,000
4	"Himalayan Sherpa"	25 October 2016	582,000
5	"Bollywood Stuntman"	1 November 2016	392,000
6	"Walking on the Ocean Floor"	8 November 2016	526,000

=== Season 2 (2018) ===
No.	Title	Original release date	Australian viewers
1	"Sadhus of India"	31 May 2018	612,000
2	"Iraqi Special Forces"	7 June 2018	498,000
3	"Amazonian Matsés"	21 June 2018	491,000
4	"Wudang Mountain Kung Fu School"	28 June 2018	491,000
5	"Kazakhs of Mongolia"	5 July 2018	400,000
6	"American Firefighters"	12 July 2018	185,000

=== Season 3 (2019) ===
No.	Title	Original release date	Australian viewers
1	"The Gaza Strip"	25 June 2019	283,000
In the first episode, Todd travels to The Gaza Strip. He arrives during the March of Return protests where to date, over 28,000 people have been injured and 280 killed in the weekly protests.
2	"Ethiopian Women's Rituals"	2 July 2019	304,000
Todd explores the rituals of Ethiopia. From the bloody ritual of male stick fighting, to the extraordinary whipping of women, this episode challenges our concepts of sacrifice, tradition and love.
3	"Mexico's Lucha Libre Wrestlers"	9 July 2019	278,000
Mexico's Lucha Libre wrestlers are some of the toughest people on the planet. Training with Luchadore, Cassandro, Todd learns the hard way how we can all deal better with adversity, fear and injury.
4	"The Nenet People of Siberia"	16 July 2019	279,000
In Siberia, Todd goes in search of the Nenet people, nomads that have guarded the century-old tradition of herding hundreds of reindeer across the frozen wilderness.

=== Season 4 (2020) ===
No.	Title	Original release date	Australian viewers
1	"Demolition Derby"	15 September 2020	346,000
Todd explores the world of extreme drivers, why they risk their lives for their passion, and how they use their minds and bodies to cope with the adrenaline, extreme stress and debilitating fear.
2	"Japanese Martial Arts"	22 September 2020	306,000
Todd will train with the masters of five distinct disciplines of martial arts, exploring how their teachings encourage not only physical and mental health, but also spiritual growth.
3	"Voodoo"	29 September 2020	255,000
Travelling to its cultural home of Benin, Todd undergoes his own initiation into voodoo, hoping to delve past the stigma and truly understand this unique and powerful religion.
