= Sean Godsell =

Australian architect

- Born: 9 September 1960 (age 65); Melbourne, Victoria, Australia
- Education: University of Melbourne, RMIT
- Occupation: Architect
- Years active: 1984—
- Parent: David Godsell
- Awards: Robin Boyd Award, 2007; Australian Institute of Architects Gold Medal, 2022
- Practice: Sean Godsell Architects
- Buildings: Kew House, 1996–1997; St Andrews Beach House, 2006; RMIT Design Hub, 2012; MPavilion, 2014
- Website: seangodsell.com

Sean Godsell (born 9 September 1960) is an Australian architect.

== Biography ==
Godsell was born in Melbourne, Australia, the son of David Godsell, also an architect. In his early years he lived in Beaumaris and attended Kostka Hall a preparatory school to Xavier College where he completed his secondary education. He later studied at the University of Melbourne, graduating in 1984. He also undertook postgraduate study at RMIT. From 1986 to 1988 he worked in the London office of Sir Denys Lasdun, returning to Australia in 1989.

In 1980 and 1981, Godsell played for St Kilda in the Victorian Football League. He made two VFL appearance and kicked two goals.

His work has been published in the world's leading Architectural journals including Architectural Review (UK) Architectural Record (USA) Domus (Italy) A+U (Japan) Casabella (Italy) GA Houses (Japan) Detail (Germany) Le Moniteur (France) and Architect (Portugal).

In July 2002 the influential English design magazine Wallpaper listed him as one of ten people destined to 'change the way we live'. He was the only Australian and the only architect in the group.

In July 2003 he received a Citation from the President of the American Institute of Architects for his work for the homeless. His Future Shack prototype was exhibited from May to October 2004 at the Smithsonian Institution's Cooper Hewitt Design Museum in New York. In the same year the Italian publisher Electa published the monograph Sean Godsell: Works and Projects. Time Magazine named him in the 'Who's Who -The New Contemporaries' section of their 2005 Style and Design supplement. He was the only Australian and the only Architect in the group of seven eminent designers.

Godsell has lectured in the US, UK, China, Japan, India, France, Italy and New Zealand as well as across Australia. He was a keynote speaker at the Alvar Aalto symposium in Finland in July 2006.

In July 2013 he was visiting professor at Iuav University of Venice and delivered the UNESCO chair open lecture in Mantova, Italy.

== Selected projects ==
- Kew House, 1996–1997
- St Andrews Beach House, 2006
- RMIT Design Hub, 2012
- MPavilion, 2014

== Awards ==
He has received numerous local and international awards. In 2006 he received the Victorian Premier's Design Award and the RAIA Robin Boyd Award and in 2007 he received the Cappochin residential architecture award in Italy and a Chicago Athenaeum award in the USA – all for St Andrews Beach House on the Mornington Peninsula.

In 2008 he was recipient of his second AIA Record Houses Award for Excellence in the US for Glenburn House. In 2008 architectural historian Kenneth Frampton nominated him for the inaugural BSI Swiss Architecture Award for architects under the age of 50 and his work was exhibited as part of the Milan Triennale and Venice Biennale in the same year.

In 2010 the prototype of the RMIT Design Hub façade was exhibited in Gallery MA in Tokyo before being transported in 2011 to its permanent home at the Victoria and Albert Museum in London. In 2012 he was shortlisted to design the new Australian Pavilion in Venice. In 2013 he received the RAIA Victorian Architecture Medal and William Wardell Awards for the RMIT Design Hub and the Harold Desbrowe Annear award for the Edward St House.

In 2022 Australian Institute of Architects awarded its highest honour, the Gold Medal, to 'master craftsman' Sean Godsell. At the National Prizes announcement the jury commended Godsell's body of work describing it as demonstrating 'an extraordinary commitment to excellence in design, detail and resolution'.
