= St Andrews Beach =

- Town
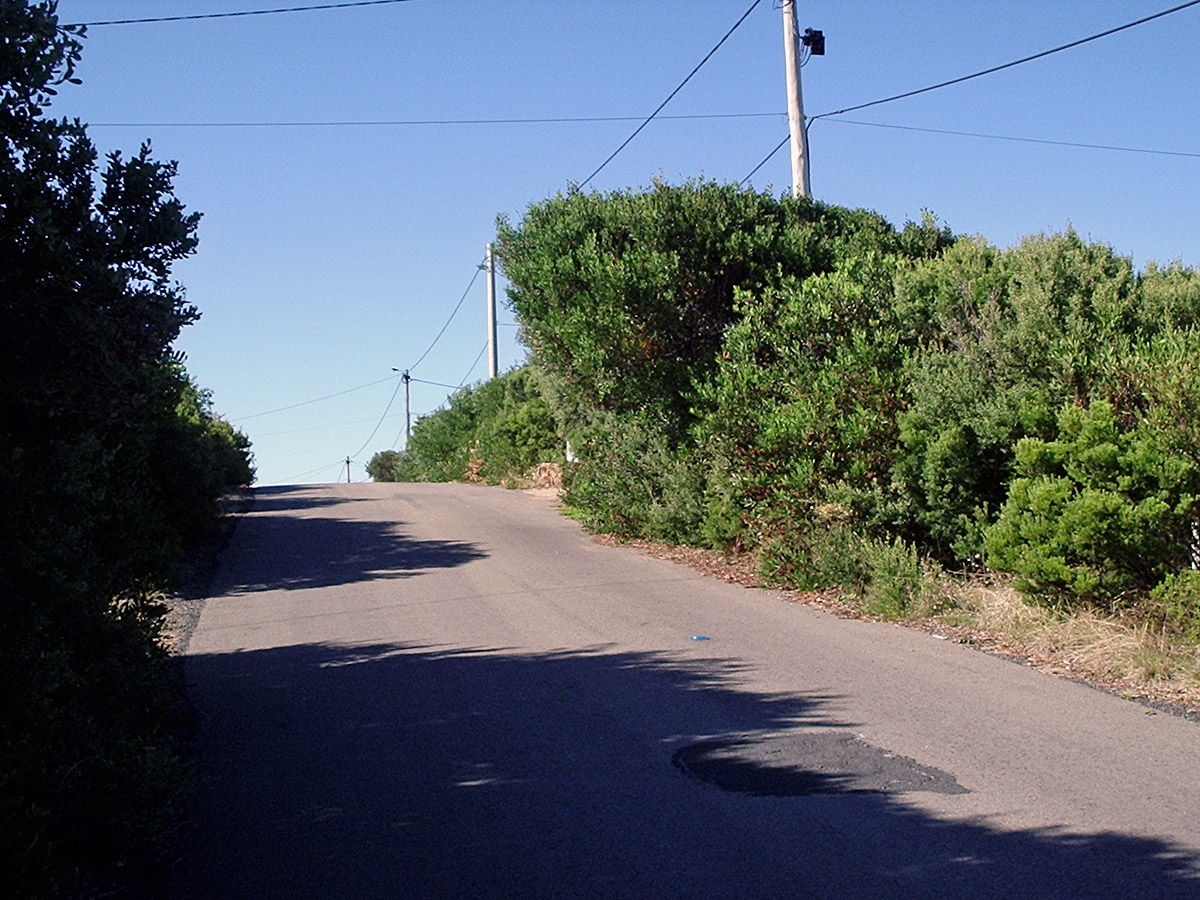
- Constantine Avenue, 2013

- Interactive map of St Andrews Beach
- Coordinates: 38.419°S 144.830°E
- Country: Australia
- State: Victoria
- LGA: Shire of Mornington Peninsula
- Location: 87 km (54 mi) from Melbourne; 5 km (3.1 mi) from Rye
- Established: 1960s

Government
  - State electorate: Nepean
  - Federal division: Flinders

Population
  - Total: 974 (2021 census)
- Postcode: 3941

St Andrews Beach is a town in the southern extremity of the Mornington Peninsula in Melbourne, Victoria, Australia, 68 km (42 mi) south of Melbourne's Central Business District, located within the Shire of Mornington Peninsula local government area. St Andrews Beach recorded a population of 974 at the 2021 census.

St Andrews Beach is located on the Bass Strait side of the Mornington Peninsula, south of Rye. It is part of a 35-kilometre (22 mi) stretch of beach that runs from Cape Schank to Portsea. It is a popular surf location with many good breaks that attract surfers all year round.

The area was first subdivided in 1959, with the development being originally marketed as "Capri Beach". In 1962, a golf course (since closed) was constructed and the subdivision was re-marketed as St. Andrews by the Sea. Originally, small holiday homes were built but, later in the 20th century, as the location became increasingly sought after, more substantial homes began to be constructed. At that time the name St Andrews Beach was adopted by the Council as its official name. Along with much of the Mornington Peninsula, land prices increased dramatically in 2020 and 2021.

St Andrews Beach is in the local government area of the Shire of Mornington Peninsula. At the 2001 census, St Andrews Beach had a population of 664, at the 2007 Census the population was 769, at the 2011 Census the population was 1,138, and at the 2016 Census, the population was 889.

St Andrews Beach features a unique topography known as The Cups Country, which creates an ideal environment for golf courses. Golfers have a choice of several nearby courses, including the St Andrews Beach Club on Sandy Road, Moonah Links off Truemans Road, and The Dunes on Browns Road.

== See also ==
- Shire of Flinders – St Andrews Beach was previously within this former local government area.
- St Andrews Beach House
