= Kew House =

Award winning house in Australia

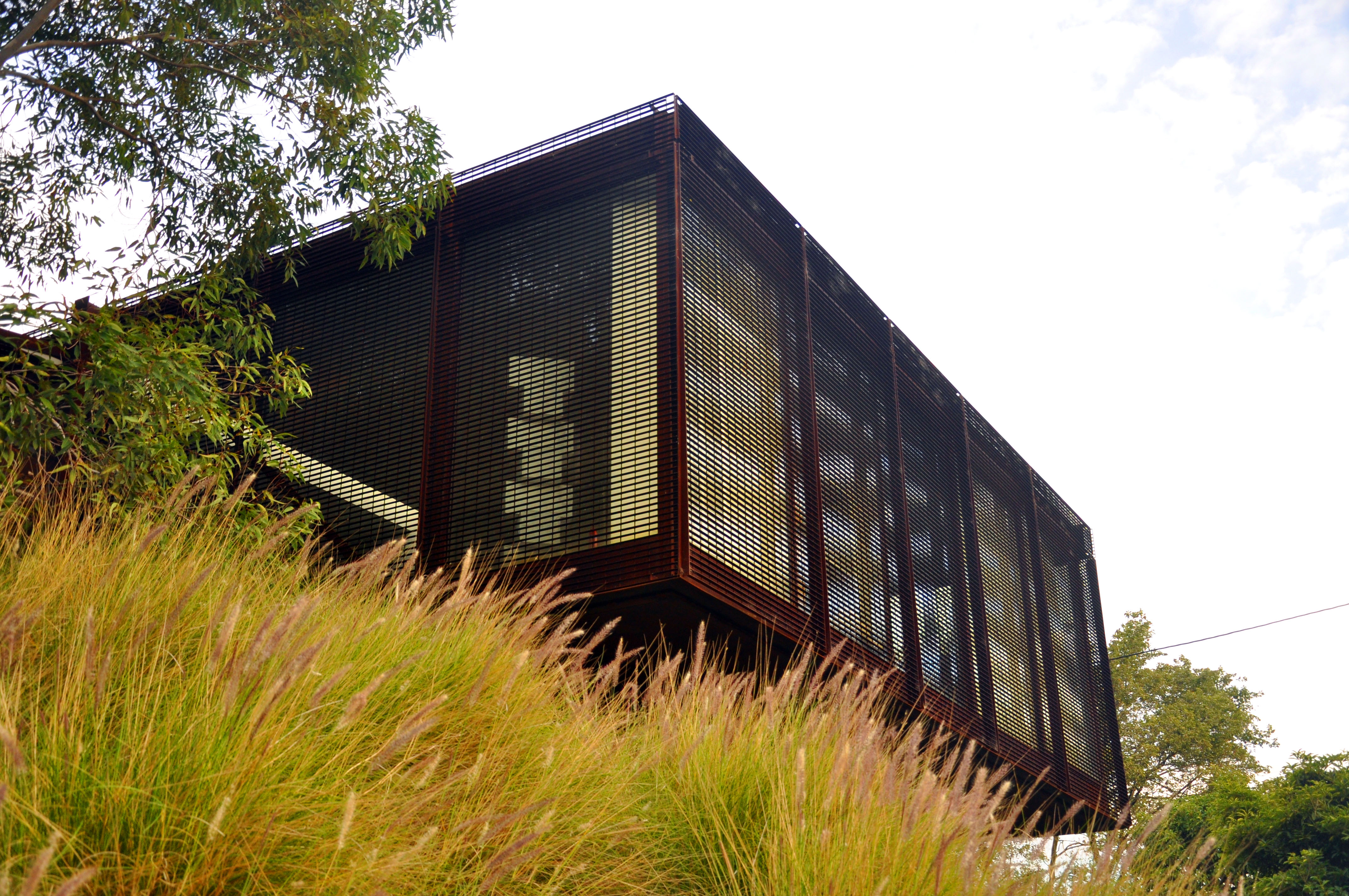

General information
- Type: House
- Location: Kew, Victoria, Australia
- Coordinates: 37°48′33″S 145°00′52″E
- Construction started: 1996–1997

Design and construction
- Architect: Sean Godsell

Kew House is an architecturally notable house designed by Australian architect Sean Godsell as his own family home, built in 1996–1997 and located at 8 Hodgson Street in Kew, Victoria, Australia.

It is a minimalist composition, an 18m by 9m glass box, encased on two sides by rusted metal screens, that cantilevers 5.5m over a steep slope at the front of the block. It is a significant award-winning early project by Godsell, who became an acclaimed local architect, and was published internationally.

== Biography ==
Sean Godsell was born in Melbourne in 1960, the son of David Godsell who was a prominent local architect, who completed a number of notable homes in the bayside area of Melbourne in the 1960s in the idiom of Frank Lloyd Wright. Graduating in the 1980s, and establishing his own practice in 1994, Godsell has always insisted on the traditions of Modernism, unlike his peers who trained when Postmodernism held sway.

== Design approach ==
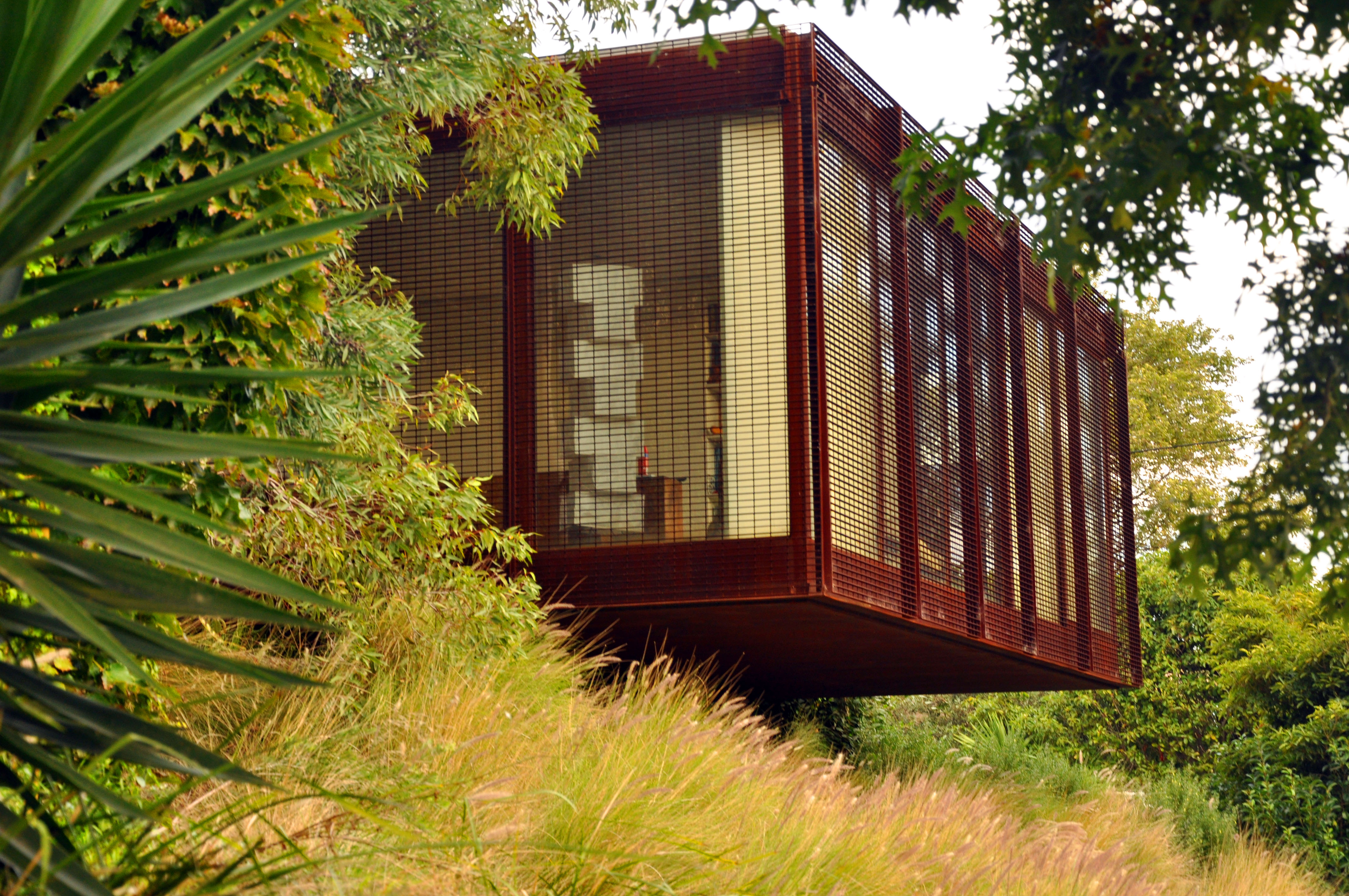
Cantilever

According to the International Architecture Year Book published in 2000, the Kew House "speculates on the emergence of an Australian vernacular born not simply from our colonial history but also from our acceptance of our regional reality as part of Asia.", that is, an architecture which is a hybrid of east and west. For instance, the open plan divided by sliding panels is eastern, while the long kitchen table, 'the altar of the Australian family' is western. In addition, Godsell states that "Although apparently 'modern' in its language, the house is primordial in its intent - rust, oiled second hand boards, recycled decking and a lack of 'precious' detail combine, with rudimentary services to form a house which is elemental rather than processed." The cantilever, which he describes as the 'heroic nature of the structure', is a reference to the post-war optimism of houses in suburbs such as Kew, North Balwyn and Beaumaris. For instance in the nearby Studley modern precinct, there are a number of houses cantilevered or propped over sloping sites, usually with carparks underneath, such as the 1961 Guss House at 18 Yarra Street.

=== Plan ===
Plan

The Japanese-influenced floor plan has no corridors; the continuous flow of space is divided only by the kitchen/bathroom and a long central wall housing a fireplace and cupboards, and sliding screens between the row of bedrooms and study on the south side. In the 1999 ABC documentary series In the Mid of the Architect, Godsell said regarding the plan : “It’s a symbolic gesture as well as a pragmatic one, but it forces a socialization that we need to deal with as a society in Australia. It forces tolerance within the house." His wife noted that "probably the most affronting thing to most people would be the lack of perceived privacy, but I don’t find it at all confrontational. I find it a very comforting, nurturing home."

=== Interior ===
The furniture and artworks were carefully chosen, designed and arranged. The east end of the house, next to the kitchen bench, is dominated by a 7m-long built-in table that was designed as the hub of life and daily activities in the home. The artworks are not hung on walls, but freestanding, or propped against the internal wall or the backs of the sofas. Godsell designed the solid, timber backed sofas (a tribute to Donald Judd), which are flanked by an Akari standing light by Noguchi and a sculpture by Pilar Rojas.

=== Sustainable design techniques ===
The external screens on the north and west sides shade the windows from direct summer sun, while sections can be lifted to allow sunlight to warm the living spaces on colder days. Cool air can be circulated through the house through a passive system that takes the prevailing south westerly wind over the front grass embankment under the house where it flows through the floor vents to the east end of the building. A fine water mist spray, placed at the top end of the embankment, can cool down the air further.

=== Addition ===
Between 2009 and 2013, a freestanding 24sqm studio was added. It is designed in dialog with but also in opposition to the original house; as stated on Godsell's website, they are 'connected by their common materiality of oxidised steel and recycled hardwood flooring, but are physically separate', and is ' deliberately solid and dark in comparison to the light filled and screened earlier house', and 'vertical, where the existing house is horizontal.' The addition won the 2014 National Award for Small Projects from the Australian Institute of Architects.

== Awards ==
- 1998 : Award of Merit – Residential New RAIA (Victorian Chapter)
- 2014 : Small Project - AIA National Architecture Award

== Gallery ==
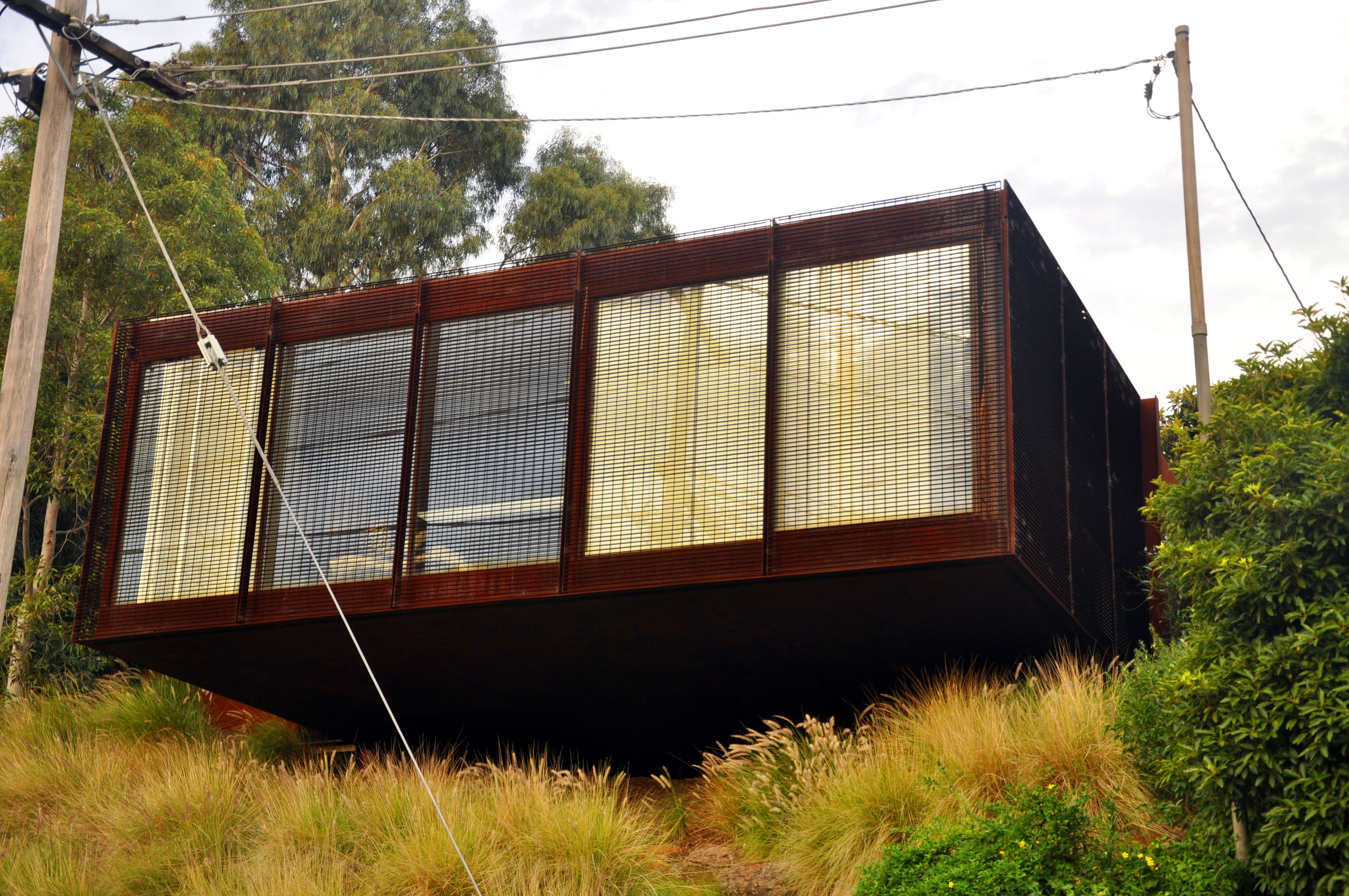
Front view

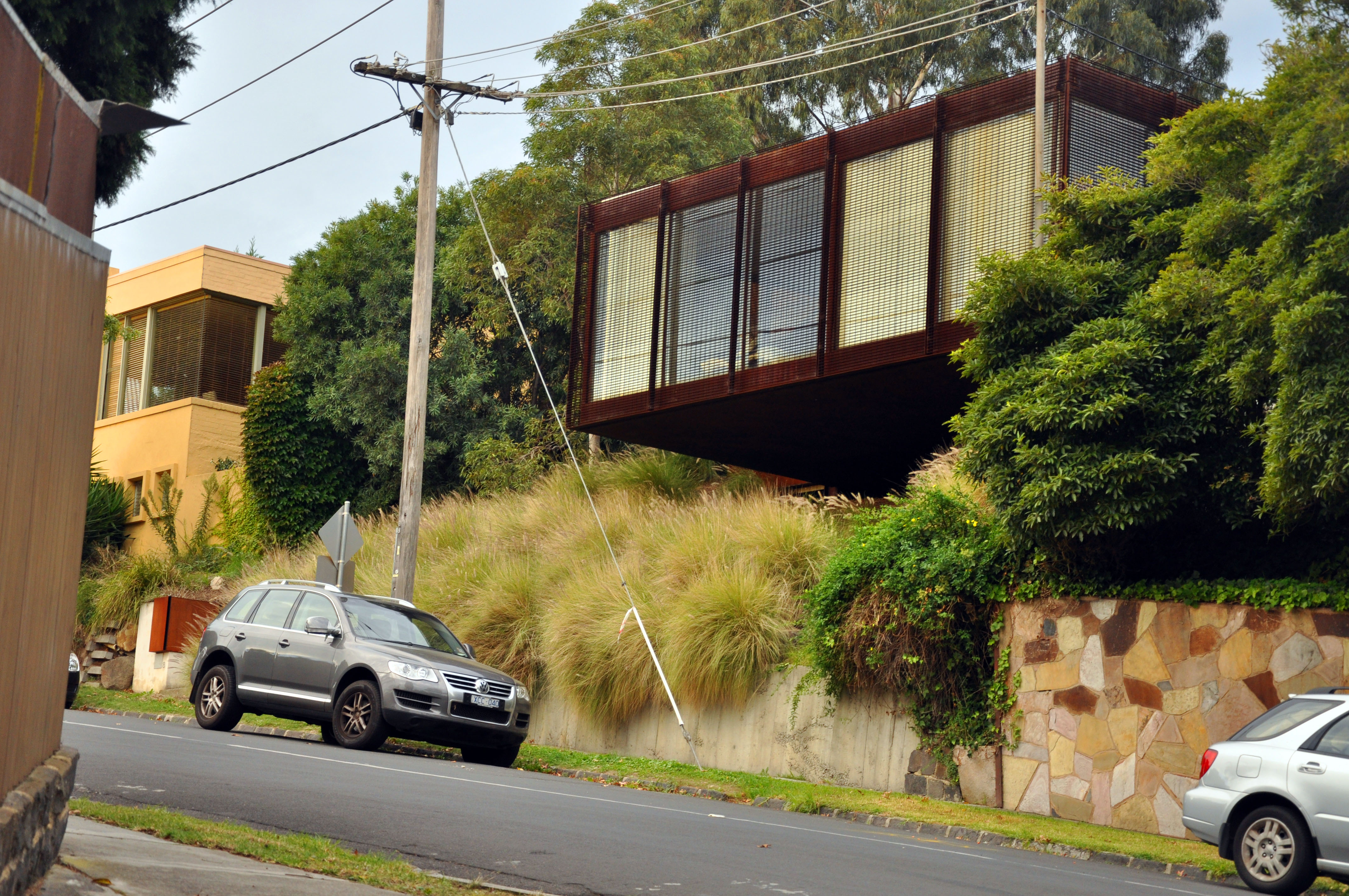
Street view

North elevation of Kew house

Structure cross section
