= Peddle Thorp =

- Company type: Privately-owned
- Industry: Architecture
- Founded: 1980s in Melbourne, Victoria, Australia
- Headquarters: Level 1, 525 Flinders Street, Melbourne, Victoria, Australia
- Area served: Australia
- Key people: Chris Doufas; Rob Page; Martin Hall
- Services: Architectural design; Interior design; Planning consultancy
- Website: www.pta.com.au

Peddle Thorp is an Australian-based architecture, interior design, and urban planning firm, with an office located in Melbourne, Victoria.

== Major architectural works ==
Peddle Thorp has designed some of Australia's landmark buildings including the following major architectural projects:

Completed	Project name	Location	Award	Notes
1988	National Tennis Centre at Flinders Park (now Rod Laver Arena)	Flinders Park, Melbourne, Victoria		
1997	Melbourne Sports and Aquatic Centre	Albert Park, Melbourne, Victoria		
2000	Hilton Melbourne Airport (now Parkroyal)	Melbourne Airport, Victoria	Excellence in Construction Award (2001)	
	Melbourne Aquarium and Antarctic Exhibition	Melbourne Aquarium, Victoria	Australian Property Council, Category Winner (2001)	
	Royal Hobart Hospital	Hobart, Tasmania	Australian Institute of Architects Awards, Urban Design Award, Winner (2008)	
	Kardinia Park	South Geelong, Victoria		
2010	ANZ Bank Headquarters	Docklands, Melbourne, Victoria	World Architecture Festival Interiors and Fit Out, Overall Winner (2011)	
2012	RMIT Design Hub	RMIT University, Melbourne City campus, Victoria	Victorian Architecture Medal (2013); William Wardell Award for Public Architecture (2013); International Prize for Sustainable Architecture (2013)	

The firm produced highly innovative design features such as the roof opening at the tennis centre at Melbourne Park, which was one of the first in the world to use this approach; to allow for play in all kinds of weather.

== See also ==
- Architecture of Australia
