= St Andrews Beach House =

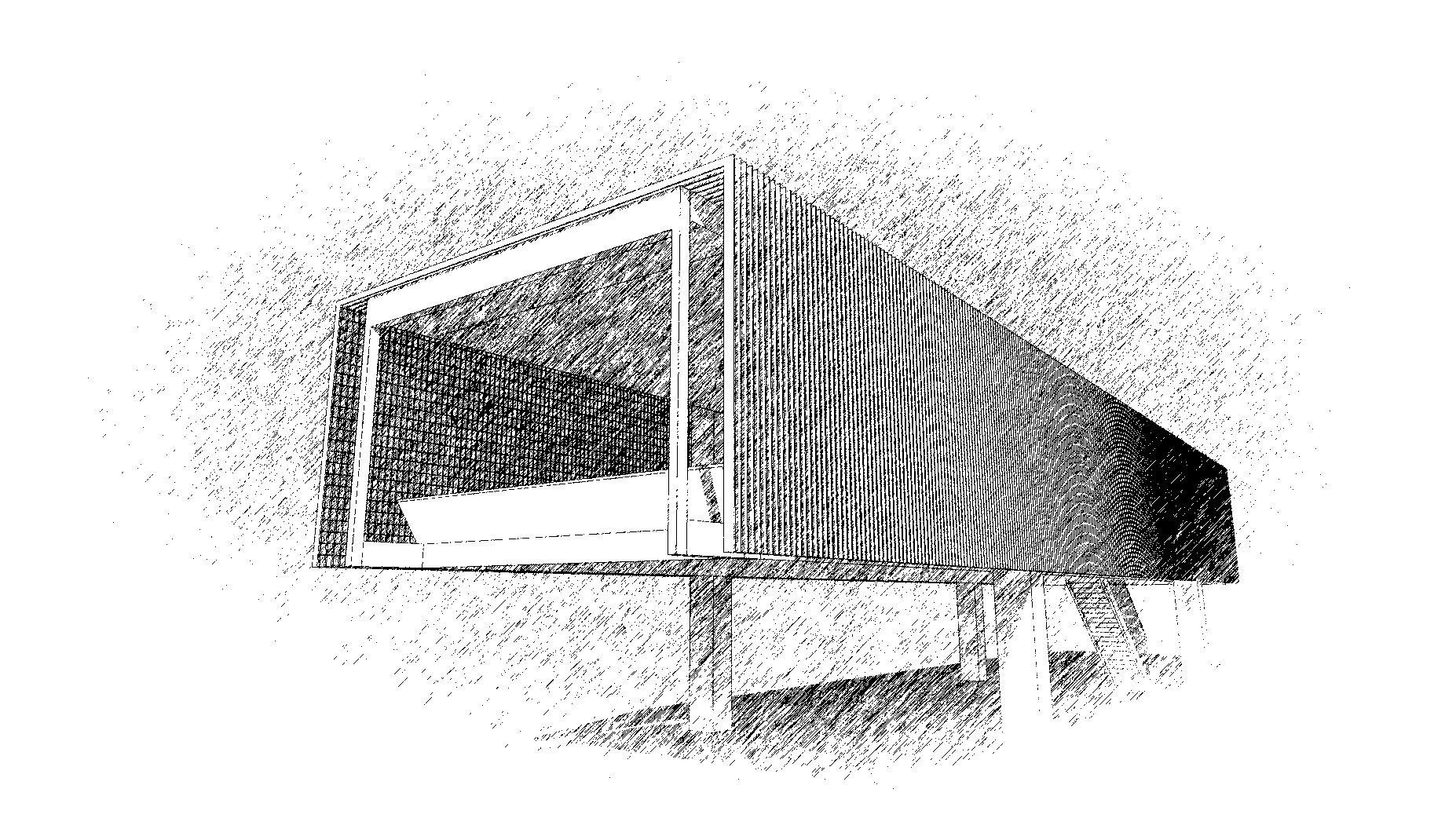
- Perspective view

General information
- Status: Completed
- Type: Residential
- Architectural style: Contemporary
- Location: St Andrews Beach, Mornington Peninsula, Victoria, Australia
- Coordinates: 38°25′25″S 144°50′3″E

Design and construction
- Architect(s): Sean Godsell
- Architecture firm: Sean Godsell Architects
- Structural engineer: Felicetti Pty Ltd
- Other designers: Sam Cox Landscaping
- Main contractor: R. D. McGowan Building
- Awards and prizes: Robin Boyd Award, 2006

The St Andrews Beach House is a residential building located in St Andrews Beach on the Mornington Peninsula in Victoria, Australia. Designed by Australian architect Sean Godsell in the Australian contemporary style, the house was awarded the Robin Boyd Award in 2006.

== Description ==
St Andrews Beach House is a three-bedroom, two-story structure that is elevated to engage with the views over the ocean. The form and colour are designed to harmonise with the surrounding landscape. The structure is designed to withstand punishing summer sun as well as the gale-force winter winds whipping across the beach front elevation.

The plan consists of two distinct elements: a communal kitchen/meals/living space and a bedroom block. This defines the separated public and private spaces in the house. Each element is bridged via a promenade deck, that takes the form of two half-length passageways on opposite sides and at opposite ends of the plan. The crossover for the route takes occupants through the heart of the principal living room which, is situated towards the west end. In order to move from element to element and from room to room one has to go outside and then inside thereby being exposed to the heat of summer and the extremes of winter.

Other parts of the home - the sunroom, breezeway and sleep-out - are re-organised into a veranda. The open plan also creates an ambiguous relationship of the interior and exterior of the house.

== Awards ==
- International Architecture Award - The Chicago Athenaeum, USA
- Detail Award - Detail Magazine, Germany
- Premier's Design Award for the Built Environment - Victoria, Australia
- South-east Development Award
- Finalist Wallpaper International Design Awards, UK
- The RAIA Robin Boyd Award for Residential Buildings
- Honourable Mention - Residential, Public and Private Architecture in the Barbara Capochin International Biennial Architecture Competition
