= Vacation =

Leisure travel away from home or work

People on vacation at a hotel in Weston, Florida

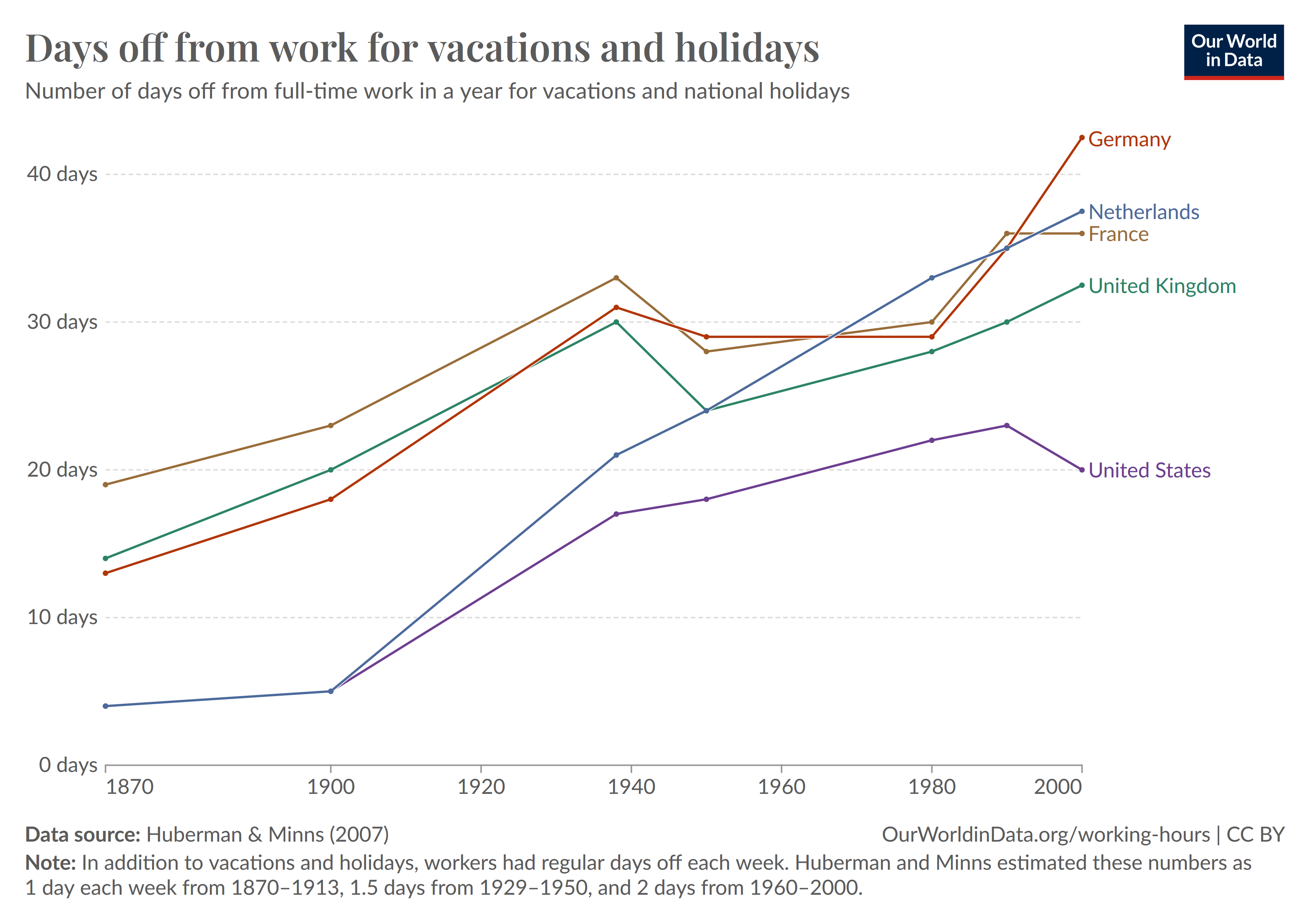
Average number of vacation days over time in various countries

A vacation (American English) or holiday (British English) is either a leave of absence from a regular job or school or an instance of leisure travel away from home. People often take a vacation during specific holiday observances or for specific festivals or celebrations. Vacations are often spent with friends or family. Vacations may include a specific trip or journey, usually for the purpose of recreation or tourism.

A person may take a longer break from work, such as a sabbatical, gap year, Holiday entitlement or career break.

The concept of taking a vacation is a recent invention, and has developed through the last two centuries. Historically, travel for recreation was a luxury that only wealthy people could afford (see Grand Tour). In the Puritan culture of early America, taking a break from work for reasons other than weekly observance of the Sabbath was frowned upon. However, the modern concept of vacation was led by a later religious movement encouraging spiritual retreat and recreation. The notion of breaking from work periodically took root among the middle and working class.

As industrialisation progressed and labor movements gained influence, the right to vacation time became more widespread. By the late 19th and early 20th centuries, paid vacations were introduced in some industries, particularly in Europe, where labor laws gradually mandated holiday entitlement for workers.

The rise of mass tourism, facilitated by advancements in transportation such as railways and later commercial aviation, made travel more accessible to a broader population. Today, vacations or holidays are recognised as an important aspect of work-life balance, with many countries legally ensuring employees receive paid time off to rest, travel, and spend time with loved ones.

== Etymology ==
In the United Kingdom, vacation once specifically referred to the long summer break taken by the law courts and then later the term was applied to universities.

== Regional meaning ==
Vacation, in English-speaking North America, describes recreational travel, such as a short pleasure trip or a journey abroad. People in Commonwealth countries use the term holiday to describe absence from work as well as to describe a vacation or journey. Vacation can mean either staying home or going somewhere.

Canadians often use vacation and holiday interchangeably referring to a trip away from home or time off work. In Australia, New Zealand and the UK, holiday can refer to a vacation or a public holiday.

In the 1800s, New York City industrialists such as the Vanderbilts, Rockefellers, Carnegies, and Huntingtons built their own "great camps" in the Adirondack Mountains of upstate New York where they could spend time with their families in private luxury, declaring that they would "vacate" their city homes for their lakeside summer retreats; thus the term "vacation" replaced the British "holiday" in common parlance in the United States, with influence from guidebook author William Henry Harrison Murray.

In Hungarian, the word vakáció can mean both a recreational trip, an officially granted absence from work (generally in warmer months), and the summer (longest) school break. For absence from work, the word szabadság (freedom/liberty) can be used, possibly as betegszabadság (sickness freedom/sickness liberty) when the reason of absence is medical in nature.

== Family vacation ==
Family vacation refers to recreation taken together by the family. Family vacation can be ritual—for example, annually around the same time—or it can be a one-time event. It can involve travel to a far-flung spot or, for families on a tight budget, a stay-at-home "staycation". Some examples of favorite family vacations might include family cruises, trips to popular theme parks, ski vacations, beach vacations, food vacations or similar types of family trips.

== Vacation research ==
Research on the effects of vacations on health, well-being and work performance started in the 1990s. The first meta-analysis on the effects of vacations was published in 2009. A 2013 literature review on the health and wellness benefits of travel experiences revealed beneficial effects of vacationing. More recent studies report on the positive effects of vacations as both a passive recovery process due to removal from job stress and as the active pursuit of relaxing, pleasurable and physical activities.

=== Anticipation effects ===
Anticipation effects of vacations refer to the changes that may occur in the time leading up to a vacation. Anticipation effects can be positive and negative. They can manifest in stress from workload or homeload (house work such as cleaning) leading up to a vacation. Research shows that health and well-being levels decrease from the second last week before vacation to the last week before vacation. This is explained by a higher workload leading up to vacation. Increasing homeload before vacation also explains a decrease in health and well-being prior to vacation, but only for women.

Moreover, research on Christmas holidays found that positive well-being effects such as enthusiasm rose in the weeks leading up to Christmas, whereas negative well-being effects such as nervousness decreased in the same time period. These effects can be explained by the pleasant expectations, called "Vorfreude" in German, that arise in the time leading up to the Christmas holidays.

=== Vacation effects ===
In a series of studies from 2010, 2012 and 2013, a team of researchers from the Radboud University Nijmegen analyzed the effects of vacations on subjective wellbeing in approximately 250 employees. The researchers examined employees before, during and after their vacation. Via telephone interviews during vacation, the researchers found that self-reported health and wellbeing improved during vacation. However, within the first week of returning to work, employee's wellbeing lapsed to pre-vacation levels, irrespective of the duration or type of vacation. The research team also found that subjective vacation experiences, such as relaxation and control over one's activities boost vacation effects.

=== Creativity ===
According to a scientific study from 2014, vacations have an effect on an individual's creativity. Researchers examined creativity by way of an idea-generation task (Guilford's Alternate Uses) in 46 Dutch employees before and after a three-week summer vacation. Participants had to generate creative uses for common daily things such as a brick or piece of paper. The results showed that ideas were just as original after the vacation as they were before. However, employees did produce a wider range of ideas after a vacation as opposed to before, showing greater mental flexibility as a result from taking a vacation. Specifically, it seems that after a vacation employees consider a greater range of aspects of thoughts and avoid routine solutions as opposed to before going on vacation.

=== Romantic relationships ===
In a study from 2012, researchers found that a vacation may act as a relationship booster by offering the opportunity to increase interactions with a partner and by enhancing spouse support. This finding highlights the importance of high quality contact between partners during a vacation. Specifically, vacationers who conversed extensively and positively with one another felt more relaxed, derived more pleasure from vacation experiences and felt more detached from their work during their holiday trip. Another study found that satisfaction with vacations can explain couples' relationship commitment and suggests that vacation may serve as a means for strengthening relationships. Another team of researchers found that shared experiences during vacations, such as effective communication, showing affection, or experiencing new things together, were positively associated with couples' day-to-day functioning at home.

=== Vacation mechanisms: why vacations are beneficial ===
Leisure is an important ingredient for overall well-being. It provides people with freetime and possibilities to engage in non-obligatory activities. This helps people to recover from job stress. In 2007, researchers developed four measures for assessing how people recuperate and unwind from work during leisure time. This study showed that four recovery experiences help to lower stress and aid recovery from strain: psychological detachment from work, relaxation, mastery, and control. Meaning and affiliation were later added, leading to the DRAMMA-model: detachment, Relaxation, Autonomy, Mastery, Meaning and Affiliation.

- Detachment refers to mental distancing from work-related tasks. Shifting focus and thinking about something other than work can be achieved by reading a book or engaging in physical activities, for example.
- Relaxation refers to low levels of physical and mental activation coupled with a positive mood. Relaxation activities calm the body and mind: for example progressive muscle relaxation, a massage, or taking a warm bath.
- Autonomy refers to a sense of being in control of your surroundings. This concerns, for example, being able to reserve certain periods of the day for enjoyable activities of your own choice.
- Mastery can be achieved by activities that challenge you and provide opportunities to improve skills and knowledge, giving a sense of accomplishment. This can involve learning new skills like playing an instrument or sports. improving existing skills, or gaining new knowledge.
- Meaning refers to leisure activities that give people a sense of making a difference in the world and contributing to a greater cause. Examples are volunteering, cultural activities or making art.
- Affiliation refers to the sense of belongingness and the sense of feeling connected to others. Activities that can lead to affiliation are for example going to parties with friends, playing games or cooking and eating together.

Each of these mechanisms serve as a mediating link between any form of leisure activities and subjective well-being. Autonomy, Mastery and Affiliation are similar to the core mechanisms in self-determination theory.

=== Methodology ===
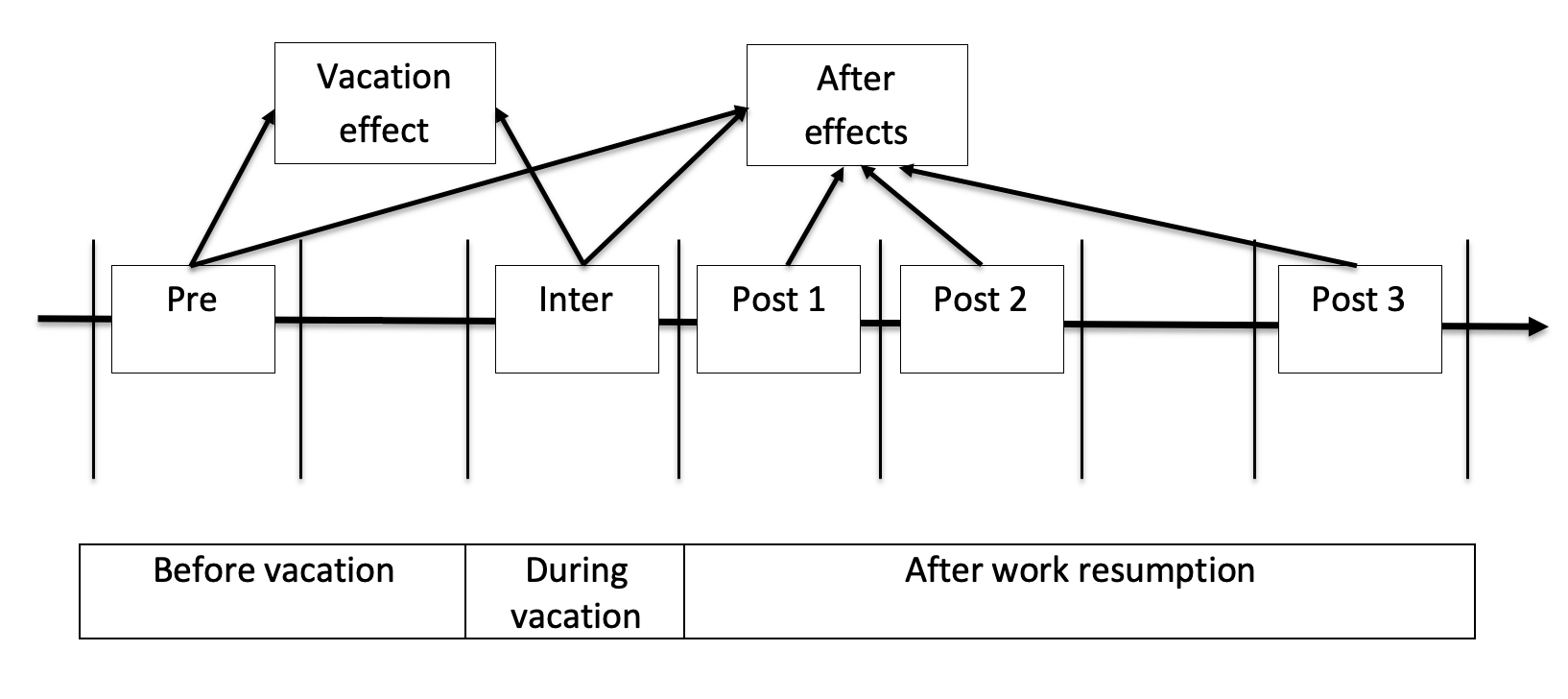
Vacation research design

Conducting research on vacations is challenging because vacationing concerns a process that stretches across longer time periods and people are often traveling and therefore hard to reach for research purposes. Randomized controlled trials in which people would be assigned to certain travel types are costly to realize and most people would probably not like to be assigned to a specific type of holiday. Accordingly, researchers have described a few important features of vacation research that help to generate reliable and valid results.

- Measures before, during and after vacation: Repeated measures in the same persons are required to study vacationing as a process that unfolds its effects over time.
- On vacation measurements: It is important to not only use pre- and post-vacation measurements but to also obtain information during vacation. This is because post-vacation measurements are biased by work resumption and fade-out may already have begun. On vacation measures could be done via live phone calls/interviews or time-stamped assessments via smartphone apps.
- Pre-vacation measurements: Research has shown that health and well-being slightly decrease shortly before vacation compared to two weeks before vacation. Therefore, vacation effects are defined as the difference between on-vacation measurements compared to pre-vacation measurements conducted at least two weeks prior to the holiday.
- Fade-out measurements: It is also useful to compare several post-vacation measurements with pre-vacation measurements to determine whether and how fast vacation effects diminish.

== Vacation policy ==
In nearly all countries worldwide, there are minimum requirements as to the annual leave that must be afforded to an employee (see also List of minimum annual leave by country).

Even in the United States, where no federal requirements as to minimum annual leave exist, many large corporations have vacation policies, some allowing employees to take weeks off and some even allowing unlimited vacation. Unlimited vacation arrangements may nonetheless come with implicit expectations, for instance, it may be implied that an employee should not take more than about the average number of vacation days taken by others. They normally also have the consequence that employees who leave the company receive no monetary compensation for leave days not taken.

According to the U.S. Travel Association, Americans collectively did not use 662 million vacation days in 2016. More than half of all working people in the United States forfeited paid time off at the end of the year. Two-thirds of people still do work while they are on vacation.

=== Unlimited paid vacation policies ===
To go on a vacation in the first place, workers make use of paid time off granted by their employers. Recently, unlimited paid time off policies (UPTO) are rising in popularity. In a study from 2022, researchers propose two competing processes and boundary conditions when it comes to unlimited paid time off. These processes can at the same time "unlock the best" and "unleash the beast". On the one hand, unlimited time paid time off can increase employees' feeling of control, accountability, and work engagement. On the other hand, unlimited paid time off may set detrimental social processes in motion which could also lead to self-endangering work behaviors, long working hours, and exhaustion. Workers may feel discouraged from taking time off, because they lack social norms on leave taking, feel insecure about taking leave or feel guilty towards their team when taking time off during busy periods at work. Absence of formal rules may lead to newly emerging informal rules which are not communicated and can increase social conflicts. The researchers also argue that leave changes from an individual trading good into a collective good under unlimited leave policies.

== Impact of digital communications ==
Recent developments in communication technology—such as internet, mobile, instant messaging, presence tracking—have begun to change the nature of vacation. Vacation today now could mean absence from the workplace rather than temporary cessation of work. For a minority subset of workers in North America and the United Kingdom, it is now the norm to carry on working or remain on call while on vacation rather than abandon work altogether. Some people do remote work while on vacation. Antithetically, workers may take time out of the office to go on vacation, but remain plugged-in to work-related communications networks. While remaining plugged-in over vacation may generate short-term business benefits, the long-term psychological impacts of these developments are only beginning to be understood.

=== Workcations ===
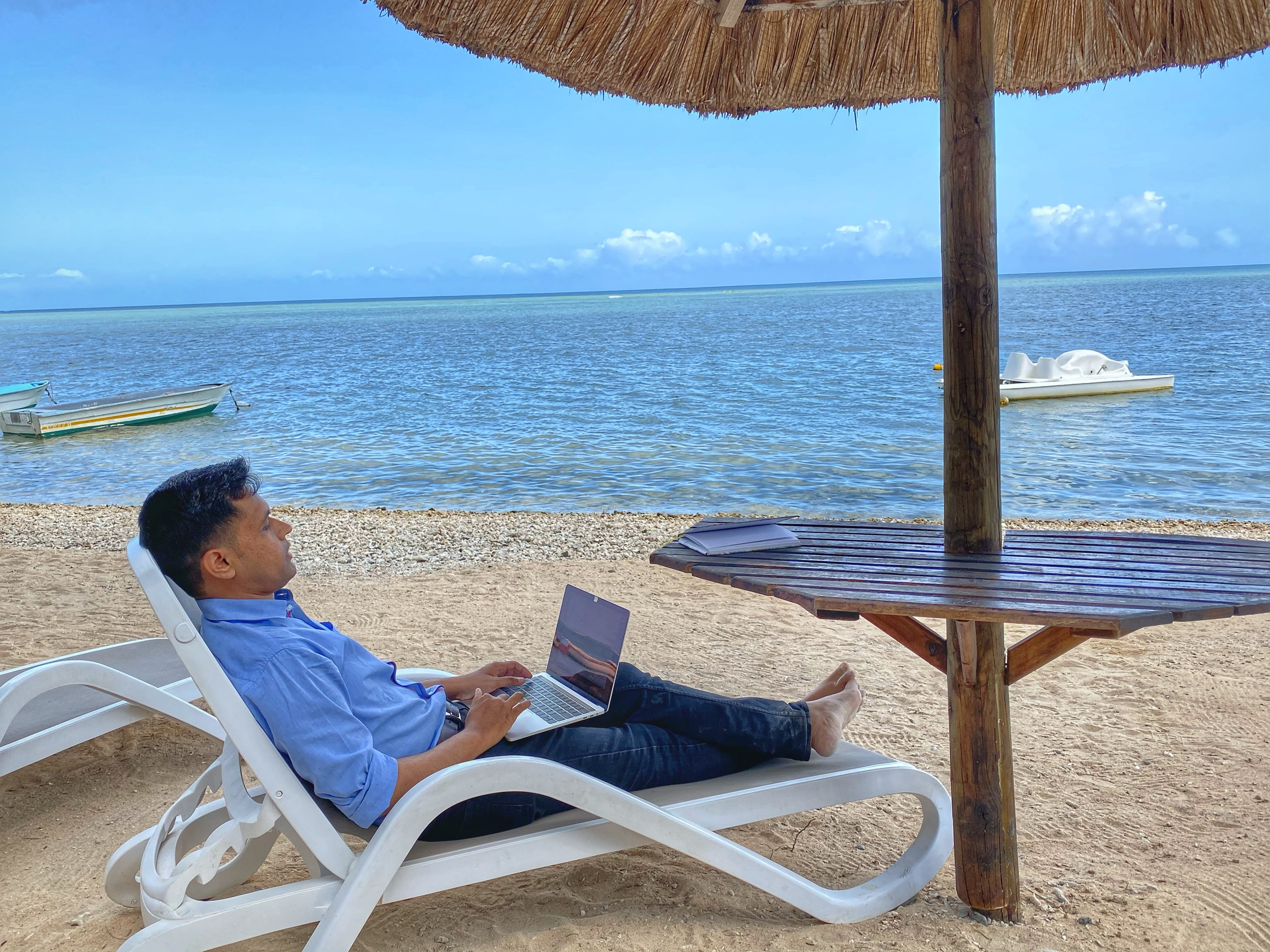
A man using a laptop at the beach

During the Covid-19 pandemic, working life became more flexible and working from various locations became more common. "Workcations" that combine aspects of work and travel can offer periods of detachment and relaxation in the same way vacations do, although those periods are shorter than during a traditional vacation.

A study published in 2020 regarding digital nomads explains how the borders between work and leisure disappear. Digital nomads can travel and work because they are not bound by normal work structures such as offices and 9-to-5 life. Working beyond regular hours is sometimes termed the infinite workday.

== In popular culture ==
Family vacation and vacation in general has become a common theme in many books and films. Writers often draw on common occurrences that take place during a vacation such as disasters and bonding.

== See also ==
- Active vacation
- Adventure travel
- Annual leave
- Bank holiday
- Family reunion
- Mancation
- Paid time off
- Spring break
- Summer vacation
