= RMIT Design Hub =

Design Hub
- RMIT Building 100
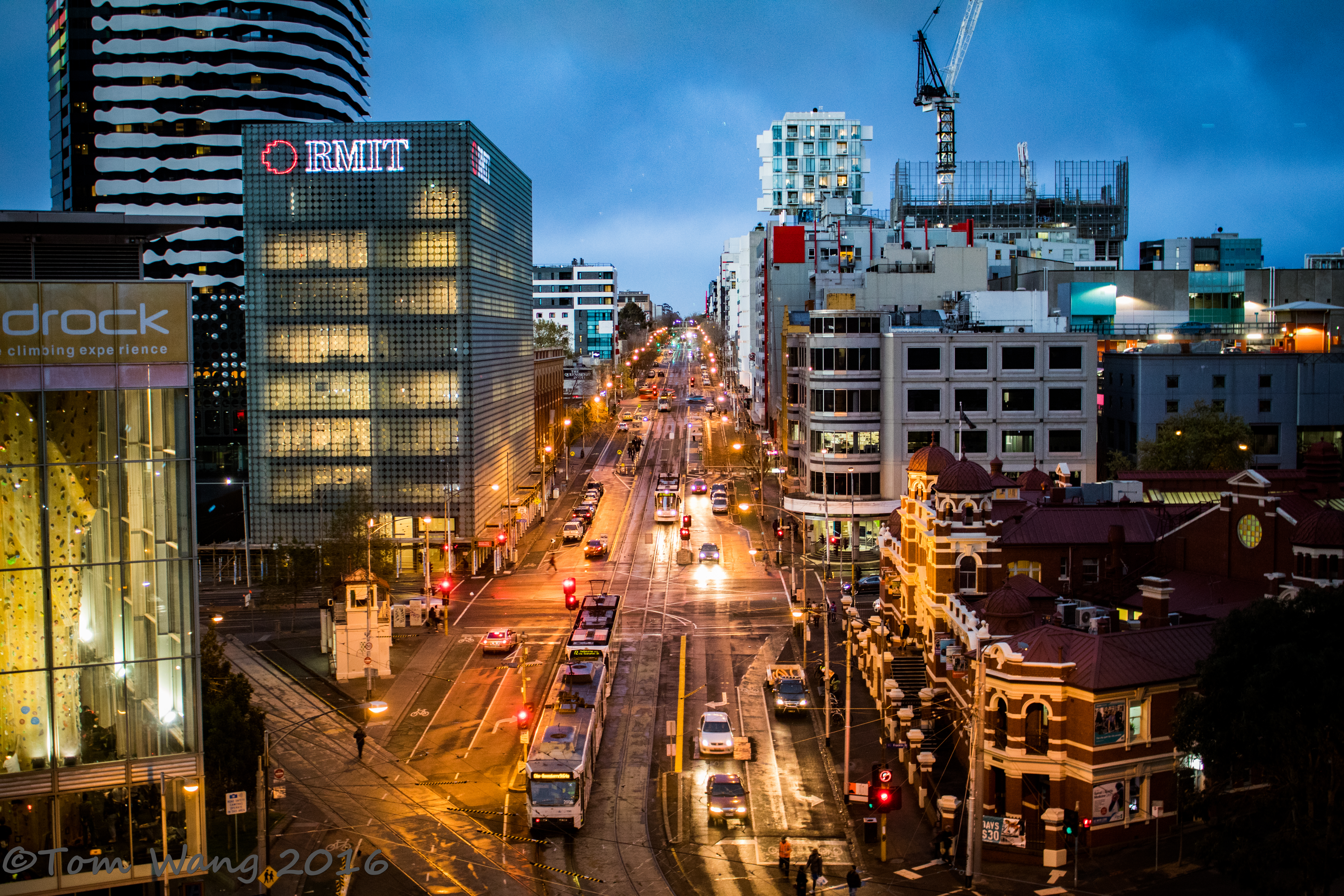
- RMIT Design Hub building (left)

General information
- Type: Educational / Institutional
- Location: Corner Swanston and Victoria Streets, Melbourne, Victoria, Australia
- Coordinates: 37.806470°S 144.962722°E
- Completed: 2012
- Client: RMIT University

Technical details
- Floor area: 13,000 sqm

Design and construction
- Architect: Sean Godsell Architects
- Architecture firm: Peddle Thorp

The RMIT Design Hub is a research, archive, exhibition, and studio space of the Royal Melbourne Institute of Technology in Melbourne, Australia located on the historic Carlton & United Breweries site.

Completed in May 2012, the Design Hub was designed by Sean Godsell Architects in association with Peddle Thorp Architects. The building is featured in the science fiction film Predestination.

== Description ==
The Design Hub has the capability of collecting passive solar energy throughout most of the day, as the surface is covered in operable disks, and has the potential to incorporate solar panels in the near future with its façade system. To achieve harvesting energy at an optimum level, ganged disks are fitted with an actuator that allows the disks to be exposed to the sun as much as possible. With the current material of sandblasted glass, the disks operate as a 'second skin' controlling solar gain and access. An internal computer controls this facade by adjusting each cell with rotational motors, according to Melbourne's daily weather.

Additional self-sustaining features include the underground water tank, which stores grey water for reuse including flushing toilets, mechanical cooling requirements, and irrigation.

The Design Hub consists of two buildings with a central forecourt in between. One building is for research and archives and the other is for exhibitions and working spaces. However, the buildings are connected at the basement level to allow delivery, movement, and storage of items. The planning of both buildings is organized in a linear manner around closed service rooms and cores. The spaces are fairly large and open due to the choice of materials.

The circulation of the building is surrounded by long corridors which can also be transformed into gallery spaces where works can be hung on the walls. High ceilings, narrow corridors, and control of light within the space give a very dramatic atmosphere in the interior. Part of the open plan design is the arrangement of furniture which can be moved around depending on the usage of space. Another key feature of the building is the flexibility of spaces. The Research groups will be able to locate their work outside of the warehouse rooms.

== Key influences and design approach ==
The Design Hub engages with contrasting eras, with the classic history of Shrine of Remembrance in Saint Kilda Road which marks the other end of Melbourne's public axis as well as its neighboring buildings.

The vantage point from the roof of the Design Hub provides a clear view of Swanston Street, North of Latrobe Street as well as the Shrine which gives all the more reason for its occupants to go to the roof. Minimalism is the main design factor for the exterior façade, which consists of circular cells achieving a dynamic design. Inspiration for the lucid discs with its steel cylindrical structure came from the beer business that once ran on the CUB Brewery site.

The intent for the Design Hub facade, however, is to encourage further use and research into solar energy. It is because of this that each solar panel can be replaced with innovative panels as the technology continues to develop. Research groups can now use this building to experiment and develop the technology, using its northern facade, dedicated to this research.

The interior of the Design Hub is designed to encourage the various research groups to 'cross pollinate' ideas with each other, regardless of the relevance between each other's fields of practice. This, therefore, provides a learning environment that should create innovation in design for years to come. Influences that addressed the choice in materials of the interior, include RMIT being an industrial college, which is reflected in the use of galvanized steel industrial walkway grating as a cladding material on the walls, creating an industrial atmosphere.

== Environmentally sustainable design ==
The Design Hub is a Greenstar Certified Project, achieving a 5-star Greenstar – Education Design v.1 rating from the Green Building Council of Australia.

The Design Hub has a number of ESD features and incorporates strategies of water, waste and recycling management that contribute to its Greenstar rating. The outer skin of the Hub incorporates automated sunshading. The shade cells have been designed so that they can be easily replaced with solar cells as research into solar energy results in improved technology and the infrastructure for that evolution has been built into the façade and building management systems. This meets RMIT's request for future proofing the ESD performance of the building while at the same time enabling the university's solar research department to continue aspects of its research in situ - the entire building façade, in other words, has the capacity to be upgraded as solar technology evolves and may one day generate enough electricity to run the whole building.

Perimeter air intakes incorporated into the double-glazed inner skin provide fresh air to the working environment which lowers energy consumption and provides a more desirable thermal comfort alternative to a wholly conditioned work environment. Lighting is sensor controlled by the BMS to reduce the need for artificial lighting when not required.

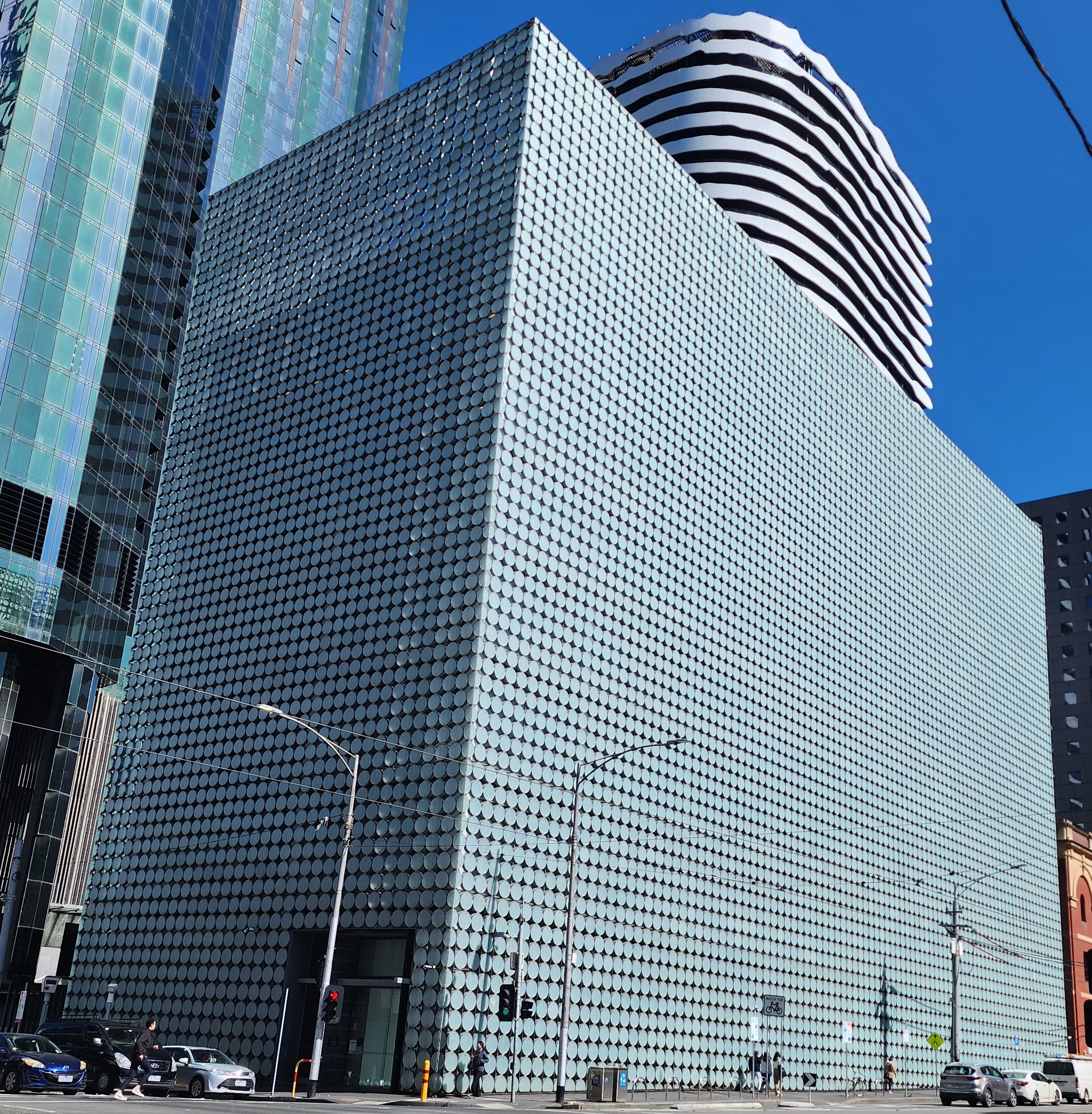

== Criticism ==
Alan Davies, writing for The Urbanist, noted that many of the claims made for the building were unsubstantiated, particularly in relation to the capacity of the façade 'cells' to track the sun, as only a limited number can rotate, and these only on one axis. Davies considered that portraying the 'capacity' to fit the cells with PV collectors as a virtue to be a 'stretch', and questioned the effectiveness of the façade either in terms of its role in façade shading, or any possible future role in generating power for the building.

Criticisms have been levelled at the insular character of the building, which was considered antithetical to the role of a design education and research organization to invite public access and to make an appropriate response to activation of its urban setting.

The Herald Sun noted problems with the façade in late 2014, with glass disks falling from the building necessitating protection of the footpath area below the building, while the causes of the façade failure were investigated.

== Awards ==
- 2013 The Victorian Architecture Medal - Australian Institute of Architects Victorian Chapter
- 2013 National Architecture Award for Public Architecture - Australian Institute of Architects National Awards
- 2013 The William Wardell Award for Public Architecture - Australian Institute of Architects Victorian Chapter
- 2013 COLORBOND® Award for Steel Architecture
- 2013 International Architecture Award, the Chicago Athenaeum and The European Centre for Architecture Art Design and Urban Studies
- Honorable Mention International Prize for Sustainable Architecture, International Awards, University of Ferrara Italy

== Bibliography ==
- Buxton, P 2013, 'Rapid Response Unit', RIBA Journal, August 2013 120:08, p 46 - 48
- Crafti, S 2013, 'RMIT's Design Archives haven for the creative', The Age, 28 August, p. 33
- Clarke, D 2013, 'Sean Godsell Architects', Houses, Issue 93, p11 - 20
- Cleary, A (Managing Ed) 2013, Architect Victoria, Victorian Architecture Awards 2013, pp. 20–21, 54–55, 66–67, 100–101
- Farrelly, E 2013, 'When a Square Building Flips Out', Architectural Record, Volume 201, No.5, pp. 104–109
- Fortmeyer, R 2013, 'Buildings Show off New Moves', Architectural Record, Volume 201, No.5, pp. 110–111
- Engberg, J 2013, 'RMIT DESIGN HUB', Architecture Australia, Volume 102, No.2, pp. 18–28
- Do, E (Ed) 2013, 'RMIT Design Hub', Archiworld, No.215, p. 60-71
- 2013, 'Tough Subtlety', El Croquis, N.165
- Rollo, J 2013, 'Happening discs', The Spectator Australia, Vol 321, No.9627, p.x
- Hockin, R 2013, 'Creative Hub', Mercedez Benz magazine, No.1.2013, pp. 54–57
- Johnson, A 2013, 'RMIT Building 100: A City Archive', RMIT Design Archives Journal, Volume 2, Issue number 2, pp. 4–9
- Edquist, H 2013, 'The Active Archive', RMIT Design Archives Journal, Volume 2, Issue number 2, pp. 10–15
- Perkins, M 2012, 'Hub has designs on RMIT's creative types', The Saturday Age, 22 September, p. 5
- Dal Co, F 2012, 'RMIT Design Hub - Melbourne, Australia', Casabella, No.815 - 816, pp. 116–151
- Cornell, A 2012, 'Gardner's ReMIT', The Australian Financial Review Magazine, August 2012, pp. 26–34
- Perkins, M, 2011, 'Smart sequins distinguish uni design hub', The Age, 12 October, p. 3.
- Gregory, R 2010, Skill – RMIT Design Hub', The Architectural Review, 1357, pp. 76–79
- Cunningham, M 2009, 'A Hub of Activity', City, 16 July, p. 12.
