= Guilford's Alternate Uses =

Test of creativity

The Alternate Uses Task (AUT) was designed by J.P. Guilford in 1967. It is used to measure divergent thinking.

== Design ==
The intent of the AUT is to have the test taker think creatively. It is generally used with a time-constraint, and consists of someone thinking of one object to start. Then within that time-constraint, that person thinks of as many objects as they can that are comparable to the original object chosen.

The AUT measures a certain level of divergent thinking; exploring multiple answers using creativity It doesn't compare to a traditional test that looks for a specific solution.

As a result, from the AUT it is measured in four ways:

- Fluency: the number of other uses you can think of, from the original object
- Originality: how different the other uses are, showing creativity
- Flexibility: the assortment of ideas that you come up with showing such a vast range
- Elaboration: "level of detail and development of the idea"

For example, the phrase "plank of wood" could be provided and the examinee would then proceed to write down words such as porch, bridge, swing, etc.

There are two approaches used in scoring participants and their output; traditional and subjective.

A traditional approach is measured based on the output of "fluency, originality, and flexibility. The output of the scores is then rated based on creativity.

On the other hand, the definitional approach involves rating things entirely differently. In the definitional approach the ratings on whether or not it is useful in comparison to traditional that rates on creative.
