= Tan Le =

Vietnamese-born Australian telecommunications entrepreneur

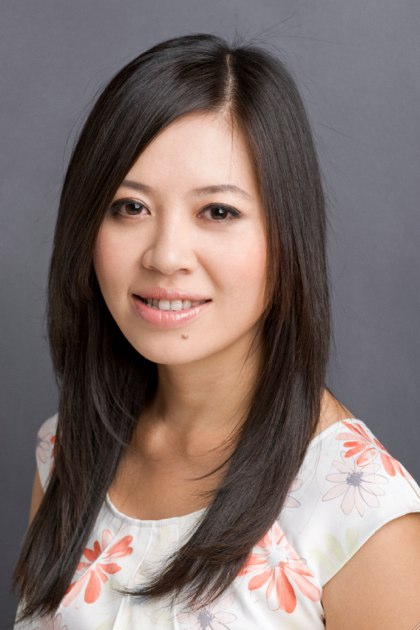

Tan Le (Vietnamese: Lê Thị Thái Tần) is a Vietnamese-born Australian telecommunications entrepreneur and a co-founder of Emotiv. She was named the 1998 Young Australian of the Year.

== Career ==
As president of the Vietnamese Community of Footscray Association, she made a number of contributions to charities and newspapers throughout Melbourne.

Le is a co-founder of software company Emotiv which specialises in electroencephalography (EEG) headsets. Le has spoken of her desire to ensure the company's products are affordable enough for the consumer. She believes that by democratising the technology, there is a greater chance of innovation from individuals, research groups and companies.

In February 2020, Le published her first book, The NeuroGeneration: The new era of brain enhancement revolutionising the way we think, work and heal.

== Recognition ==
In 1998, Le was named Young Australian of the Year and one of Australia's 30 Most Successful Women Under 30.

Le's story was featured in the 'Hope' section of the Eternity Exhibition of the National Museum of Australia.

Preceded by Nova Peris-Kneebone	Young Australian of the Year; 1998	Succeeded by Bryan Gaensler
