= Allan Snyder =

Australian scientist

Allan Whitenack Snyder
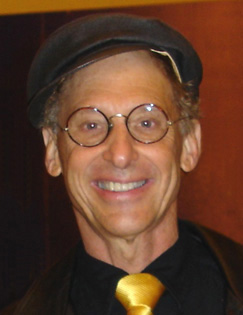
- Born: 1942 (age 83–84); Philadelphia, Pennsylvania, U.S.
- Education: University of London (DSc), University College London (PhD), Harvard (MS), Massachusetts Institute of Technology (SM), Pennsylvania State University (BS), Central High School Philadelphia (BA)
- Awards: 1996 Harrie Massey Medal of the British Institutes of Physics, 1997 International Australia Prize, 2001 Marconi Prize, 2001 Clifford Paterson Prize, Royal Society
- Scientific career
- Fields: Mind Sciences, Visual Neurobiology, Communications and Optical Physics
- Workplaces: Director, Centre for the Mind, University of Sydney

Allan Whitenack Snyder (born 1942) is the director of the Centre for the Mind at the University of Sydney, Australia where he also holds the 150th Anniversary Chair of Science and the Mind. He is a co-founder of Emotiv Systems and winner of the International Australia Prize in 1997 and the Marconi Prize in 2001 for his contributions to optical physics. Snyder is also the Creator and Chairman of the What Makes a Champion? forum, an official Olympic cultural event first held at the Sydney 2000 Olympic Games. He is also the Chair of Research on the MindChamps World Research, Advisory and Education Team, with a focus on neuroscience.

Snyder's research career began in optical physics. More recently, he has worked on mind sciences. He has appeared on television demonstrating how transcranial magnetic stimulation to the left temporal lobe can induce savant-like skills.

== Savant hypothesis ==
Snyder is interested in understanding savants. In savants, according to Snyder, the top layer of mental processing—conceptual thinking, making logical deductions—is somehow deactivated. His working hypothesis is that once this layer is inactivated, there is a capacity for recalling the minute detail or for performing lightning-quick calculations. He believes it may be possible someday to create technologies that will allow any non-autistic person to access these abilities.

== Awards ==
He won the Harrie Massey Medal and Prize in 1996.

In December 2001 he received the Marconi Prize in New York City.

He was elected a Fellow of the Royal Society of London in 1990 and is the recipient of their 2001 Clifford Paterson Prize.

Previously, he was a Guggenheim Fellow at Yale University’s School of Medicine and a Royal Society Research Fellow at the Physiology Laboratories of Cambridge University. He is a graduate of Harvard University, Massachusetts Institute of Technology and University College London.

== Education ==
Snyder has a DSc from the University of London, a PhD from University College (1969), London, an MS from Harvard University (1967), an SM from Massachusetts Institute of Technology (1965) and a BS in Electrical Engineering from Pennsylvania State University (1963), University Park.

== Centre for the Mind ==
The Centre for the Mind is the brainchild of Allan Snyder, and was launched at the Museum of Sydney on 4 August 1997; Oliver Sacks delivered the Foundation Lecture on "Creativity and the Mind" at the public opening on 5 August 1997, at the Australian Academy of Science.

The inaugural Centre for the Mind board members were:

- Allan Snyder
- Gavin Brown
- Peter Karmel
- Lachlan Murdoch
- Baz Luhrmann

Distinguished Medal recipients:

- Daniel Dennett
- Horace Barlow
- Vilayanur Ramachandran
- Richard Branson

=== Mission ===
"We explore what it is to be uniquely human. We do this by investing in challenging research, by orchestrating spectacular intellectual events, and by acting as a global nexus for great minds. Our mind laboratories focus on scientific ways to enhance creativity and to instill the champion mindset."
