= New South Wales Enduring Architecture Award =

Annual award for culturally significant buildings in New South Wales, Australia

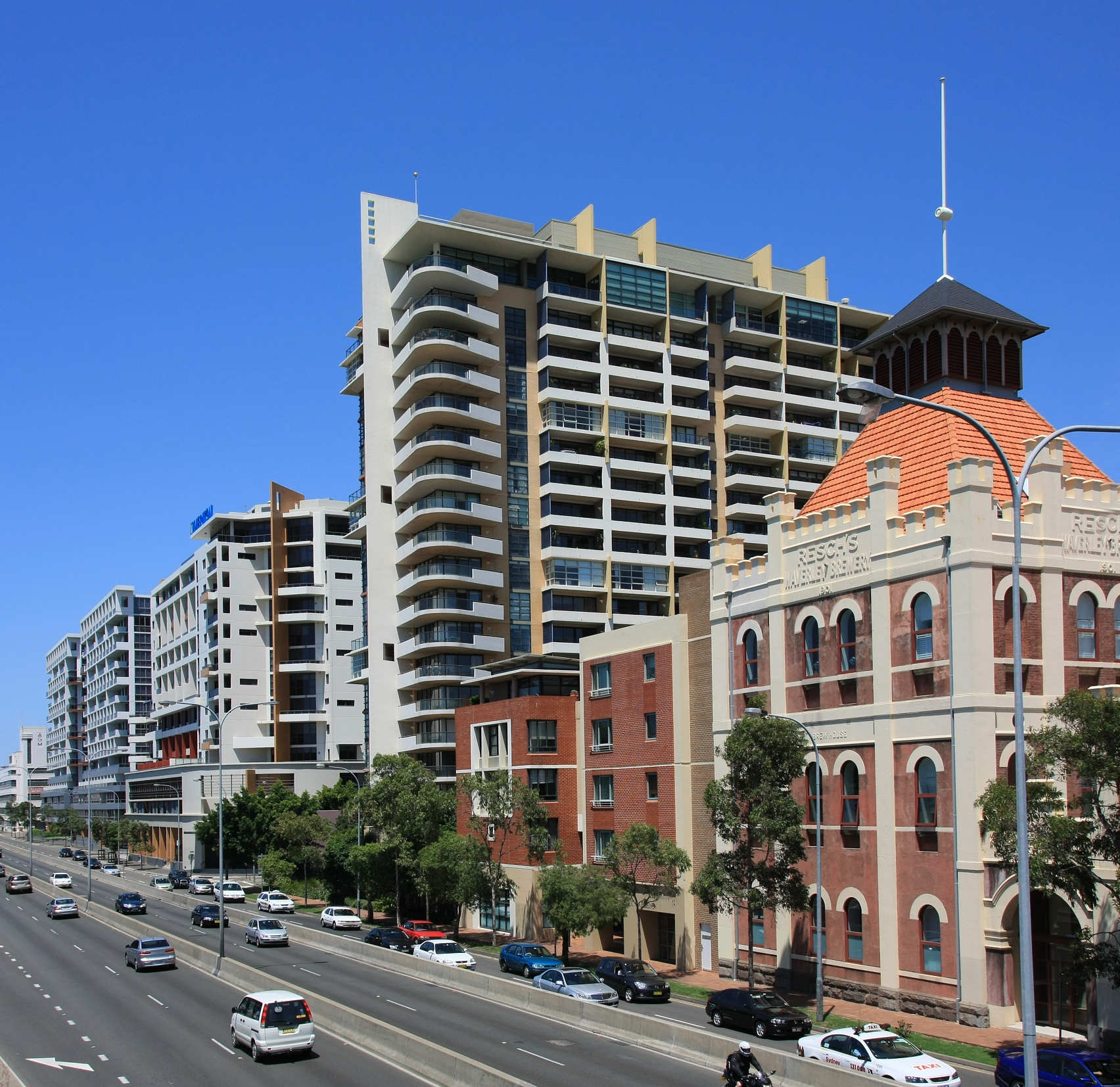
- 2025 Award winner, Moore Park Gardens precinct, built 2000
- Awarded for: Outstanding architecture over time (25 years or more)
- Country: Australia
- Presented by: Australian Institute of Architects (NSW Chapter)
- First award: 2003; 23 years ago
- Currently held by: AJC Architects for Clubbe Hall, 2026

The New South Wales Enduring Architecture Award is an architecture award presented annually by the New South Wales Chapter of the Australian Institute of Architects (AIA) since 2003. The award recognises existing buildings older than 25 years since construction. The average age of the 24 awarded projects to date is 45.3 years (between 2003—2026).

== Background ==
=== Purpose ===
The award recognises significant, long lasting and innovative architecture with usually more than 25 years passed since the completion of construction. The Enduring Architecture Award recognises achievement for the design of buildings of outstanding merit, which have remained important as high quality works of architecture when considered in contemporary cultural, social, economic and environmental contexts.

=== Nomination process ===
Nominations for the award can be made by AIA members, non–members and non–architects, but must provide adequate material and information supporting the nomination for consideration of the jury. The nomination process is open to AIA members and public via a web portal during the awards submission window (between November and February).

=== Political agenda of Award ===
The Enduring Architecture Award has gained an important role in highlighting conservation efforts for highly valued buildings at risk of significant changes or even demolition. Both the Sirius Building public housing project in The Rocks and the MLC Building in North Sydney had both been at risk of alteration or demolition at the hands of their owners. The AIA has used the awards to raise public awareness of the plight of culturally significant buildings under threat, assisting in both cases to preserve the building and enhance heritage listing status.

== National Awards ==
Recipients of a state–based award are eligible for consideration for the National Award for Enduring Architecture presented later in the same year, as part of the Australian National Architecture Awards. Between 2003 and 2025 nine of the 23 National Awards were located in New South Wales.

== Awards by year ==
=== 2024 Award ===
In February 2024 it was announced the three person jury would be formed of Caroline Pidcock (Jury Chair), Paulo Macchia (Government Architect NSW) and Leone Lorrimer (GHD). In the run up to the Awards presentation, three buildings were announced as under consideration for the 2024 Award including; St Mary's Cathedral, Sydney by Michael Fox Architects, NSW State Projects, William Wardell and Cyril Wardell; The Glass House, Castlecrag by Bill and Ruth Lucas and St Johns Village, Glebe by Hely, Bell & Horne (winner of the 1964 Sir John Sulman Medal).

At the NSW Architecture Awards held on 28 June 2024, The Glass House, Castlecrag was presented with the 2024 Award. The Award was accepted by Peter Lucas, son of Ruth and Bill Lucas, and builder of the recent restoration of the house completed in 2023 with Cracknell & Lonergan Architects.

=== 2025 Award ===
In January 2025 it was announced the three person jury would be formed of former NSW Premier, the Honorable Bob Carr (Jury Chair) with architects Helen Lochhead AO and Peter McGregor (McGregor Westlake Architecture).

At the 2025 NSW Architecture Awards, the inner city residential development known as Moore Park Gardens was presented with the award. The project was designed by AJC Architects and completed in 2000 on the former Tooths Brewery site between South Dowling Street and Bourke Streets, Redfern.

The jury citation described the project "...the site’s built form is both articulate and distinctive, with efficient planning and excellent apartment amenity that extends across towers, street edge blocks, maisonettes, and cross-overs. The robust and workmanlike material fabric shows few signs of age 25 years on, and the hundreds of residents that have maintained tenancy over this time demonstrate the ongoing success and relevance of the architecture, and the rich legacy it provides."

== Recipients of the Award ==
New South Wales Enduring Architecture Award (reverse order)
Year	Architect	Project	Location	Year Built	Years Since	Other AIA/RAIA Awards
2026	Allen, Jack and Cottier	Clubbe Hall, Frensham School	Waverley Parade and Range Road, Mittagong	1966	60 years	Blacket Prize, 1966 (NSW)
2025	Allen, Jack and Cottier	Moore Park Gardens	780 Bourke Street, Redfern	2000	25 years	President's Award, 1999 (NSW)
2024	Bill and Ruth Lucas	The Glass House	80 The Bulwark, Castlecrag	1957	66 years	Heritage Architecture Award (Conservation), 2024 (NSW); Built Heritage Award (Small Scale), 2024, National Trust NSW; Lachlan Macquarie Award for Heritage Architecture, 2024; Note: 2024 awards presented to Cracknell & Lonergan Architects for heritage work
2023	Hassell	Olympic Park Station	Sydney Olympic Park	1998	25 years	Sir Zelman Cowen Award for Public Architecture, 1998; Access Citation Award, 1998
2022	Ken Woolley	Woolley House (now Woolley Hesketh House)	34 Bullecourt Avenue, Mosman	1962	60 years	National Award for Enduring Architecture, 2022; Wilkinson Award, 1962
2021	Bates, Smart & McCutcheon	MLC Building	105–153 Miller Street, North Sydney	1957	64 years	
2020	Richard Leplastrier	Palm Garden House	Bilgola Beach	1976	44 years	National Award for Enduring Architecture, 2020
2019	Edward Raht	350 George Street	350 George Street, Sydney	1895	124 years	
2018	Tao Gofers, NSW Department of Housing with Alexander and Lloyd Architects	Sirius Building	38–70 Cumberland Street, The Rocks, Sydney	1980	38 years	
2017	Aaron M Bolot	17 Wylde Street Apartments	17 Wylde Street, Potts Point	1951	66 years	National Award for Enduring Architecture, 2017
2016	John James & Associates	Reader’s Digest Building	Waterloo Street, Surry Hills	1967	49 years	National Award for Enduring Architecture, 2016
2015	Hugh Buhrich	Buhrich House II	375 Edinburgh Road, Castlecrag	1972	43 years	
2014	Ian McKay and Philip Cox; Architects in Association	Tocal College (CB Alexander Campus)	815 Tocal Road, Paterson	1963	51 years	Blacket Prize, 1964; National Award for Enduring Architecture, 2014
2013	Peddle Thorp & Walker	AMP Building	33 Alfred Street, Sydney	1962	51 years	
2012	Harry Seidler	Australia Square	264 George Street, Sydney	1967	45 years	National Award for Enduring Architecture, 2012; Sir John Sulman Medal, 1967; RAIA Civic Design Award, for a work of outstanding environmental design, 1967
2011	Glenn Murcutt	Magney House	Bingie Point	1984	27 years	Robin Boyd Award, 1985; National Award for Enduring Architecture, 2011
2010	Harry Seidler	Glen Street Offices	2 Glen Street, Milsons Point	1973	37 years	RAIA Interior Design Award (Penthouse apartment), 1991; RAIA Award, 1991; Sir John Sulman Medal, 1981; RAIA Award, 1974
2009	Bruce Rickard	Curry House 2	Bayview, Sydney	1982	27 years	Merit Award, 1983
2008	Vivian Fraser in Association with NSW Government Architect (Ian Thomson)	Wharf Theatre	Walsh Bay	1985	23 years	National Award for Enduring Architecture, 2008; President's Award for Recycled Buildings, 1985 (National Awards)
2007	E.H. Farmer (NSW Government Architect) and Andrew Andersons (Design Architect)	First Extension to the Art Gallery of New South Wales (Captain Cook Wing)	Art Gallery of NSW	1972	35 years	Sir John Sulman Medal, 1975; City of Sydney Architectural Award, 1973
2006	Peter Hall (Hall Todd & Littlemore)	Concert Hall & Opera Theatre of the Sydney Opera House	Sydney	1973	33 years	National Award for Enduring Architecture, 2003
2005	J.W. Thomson (NSW Government Architect); David Turner (Project Architect); Allen Jack + Cottier (Documentation); Bruce Mackenzie (Landscape Architect)	Kuring-gai College of Advanced Education (now Lindfield Learning Village)	100 Eton Road, Lindfield	1972	35 years	RAIA Merit Award, 1972; Sir John Sulman Medal, 1978
2004	Glenn Murcutt	Kempsey Farmhouse	Kempsey	1974	30 years	Blacket Prize, 1977; National Award for Enduring Architecture, 2004
2003	Jørn Utzon	Sydney Opera House	Sydney	1973	30 years	National Award for Enduring Architecture, 2003; Utzon awarded the 1973 Australian Institute of Architects Gold Medal, the year of building opening; RAIA Merit Award, 1974; RAIA Civic Design Award, 1980; RAIA Commemorative Sir John Sulman Medal, Jørn Utzon, Sydney Opera House, 1992; NSW Architecture Medallion, 2023 (Renewal by Ashton Raggatt McDougall); Greenway Award for Heritage, 2023 (NSW); John Verge Award for Interior Architecture, 2023 (NSW); Emil Sodersten Award for Interior Architecture, 2023; Lachlan Macquarie Award for Heritage, 2023

== Gallery ==
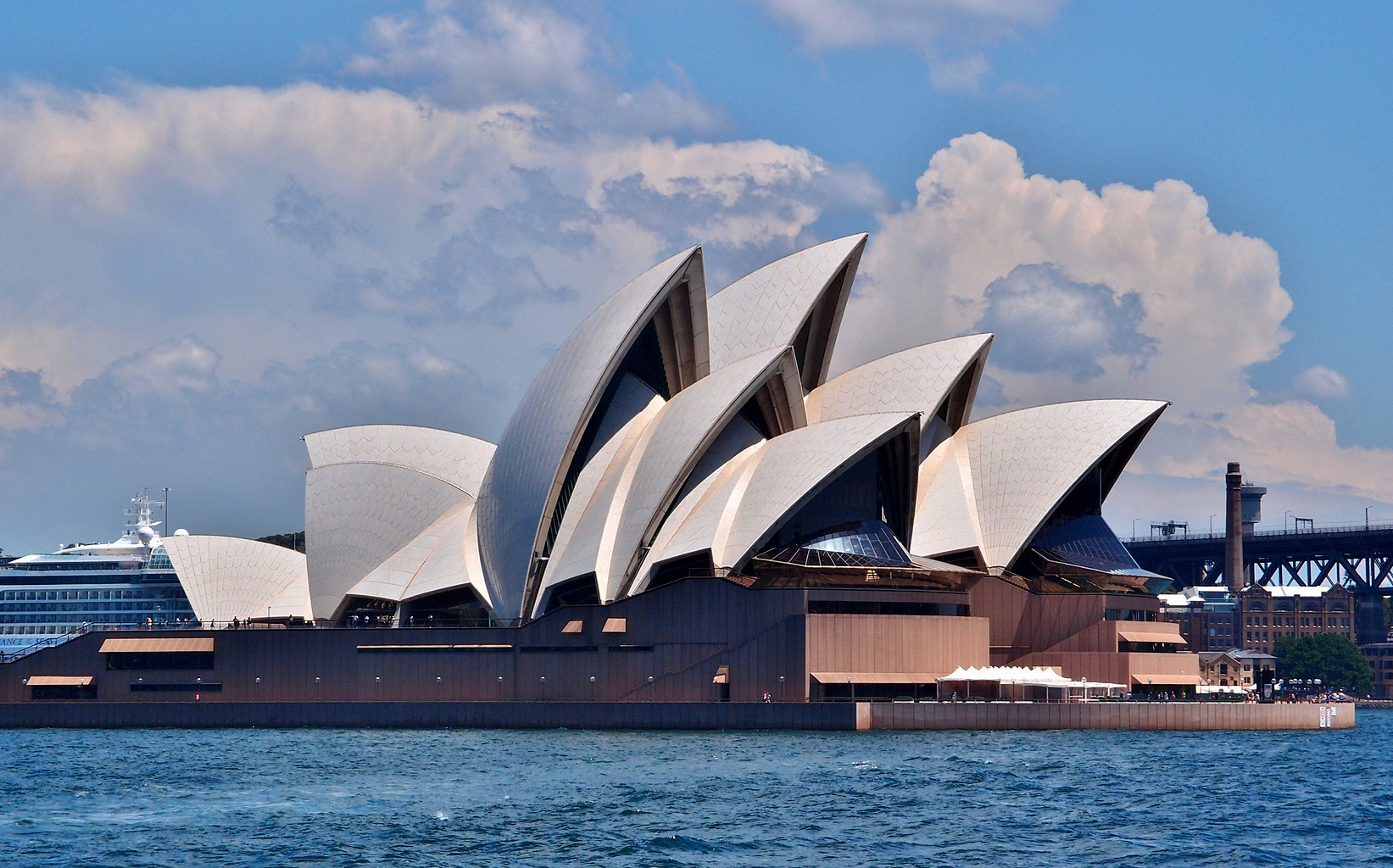
2003 Award, Sydney Opera House, opened 1973

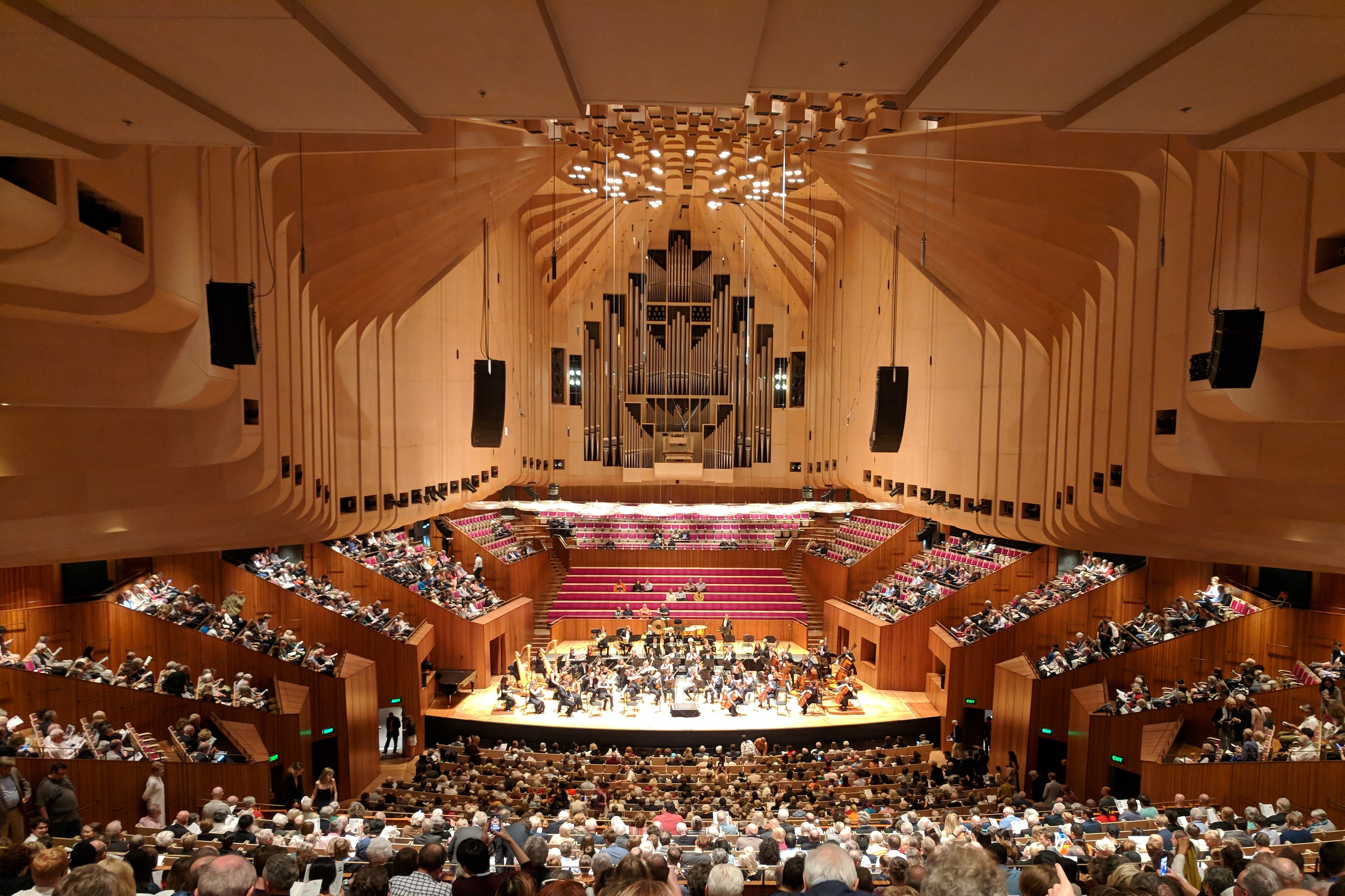
2006 Award, Sydney Opera House interiors, opened 1973

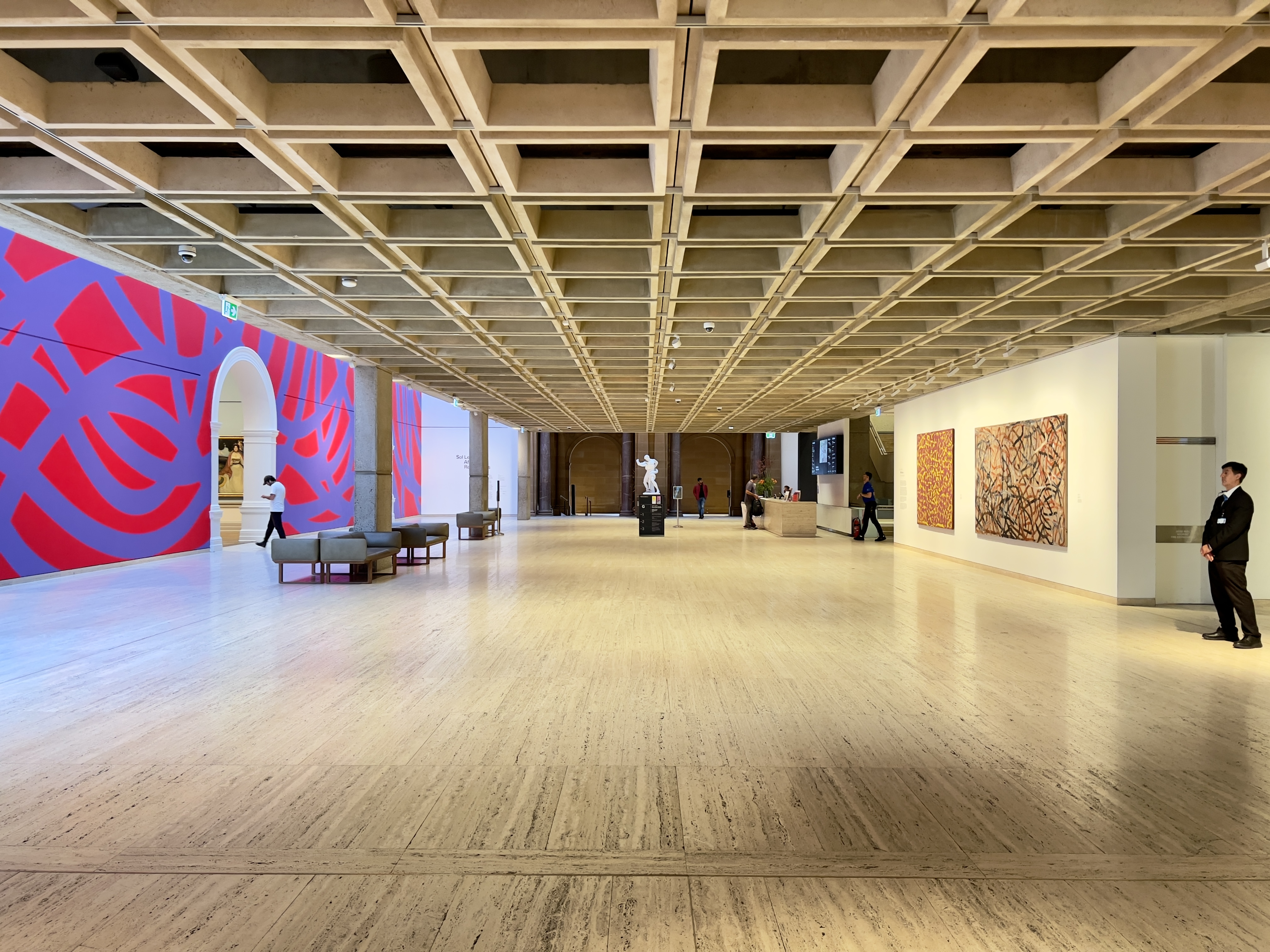
2007 Award, Art Gallery of NSW (Captain Cook Wing), opened 1972

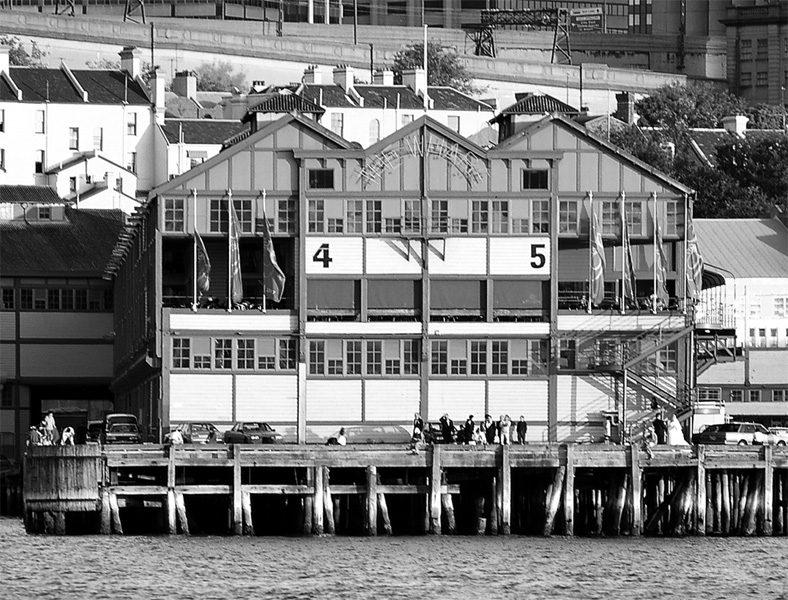
2008 Award, Wharf Theatre, opened 1985

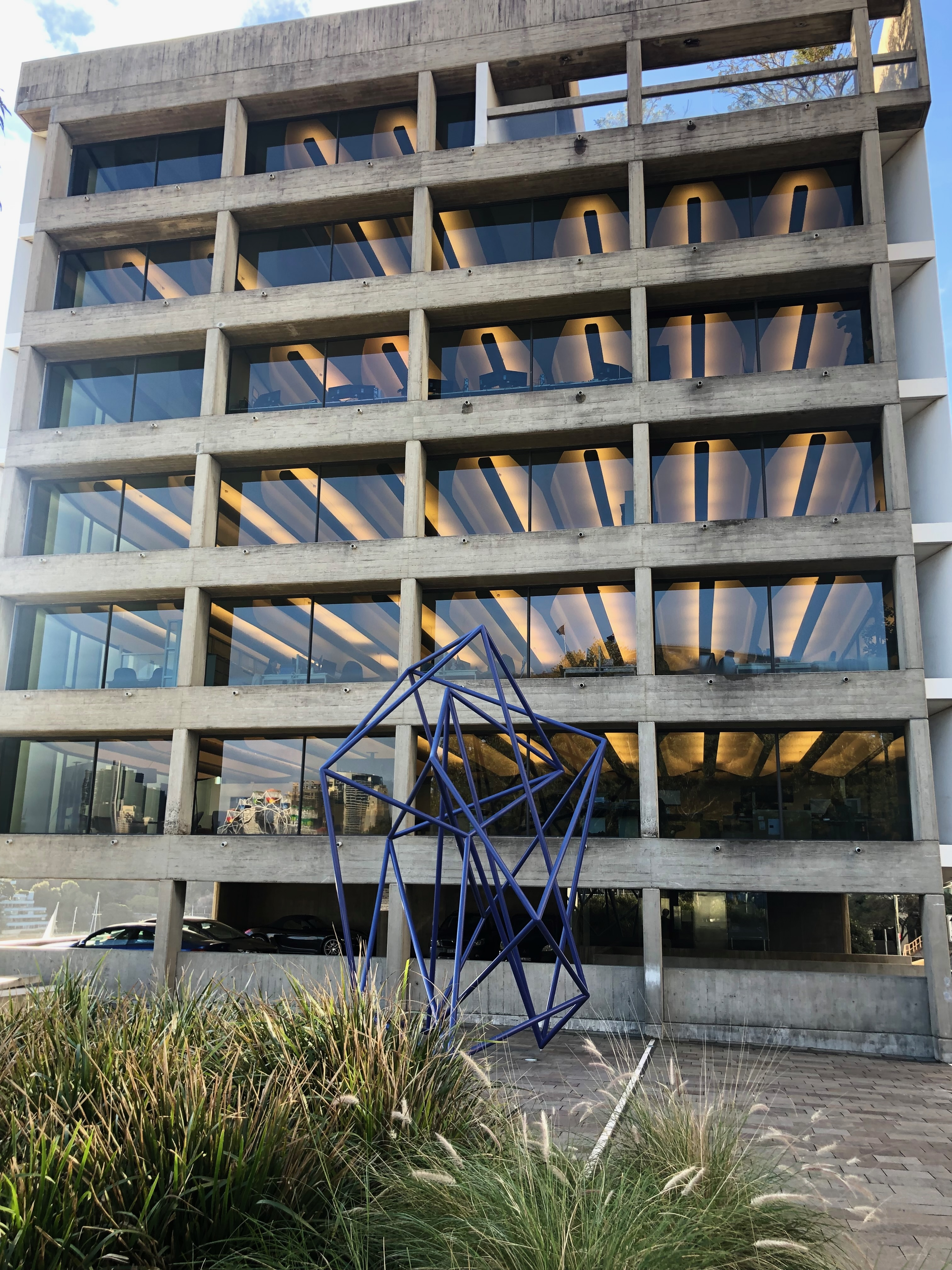
2010 Award, Seidler Offices, Milsons Point, built 1973

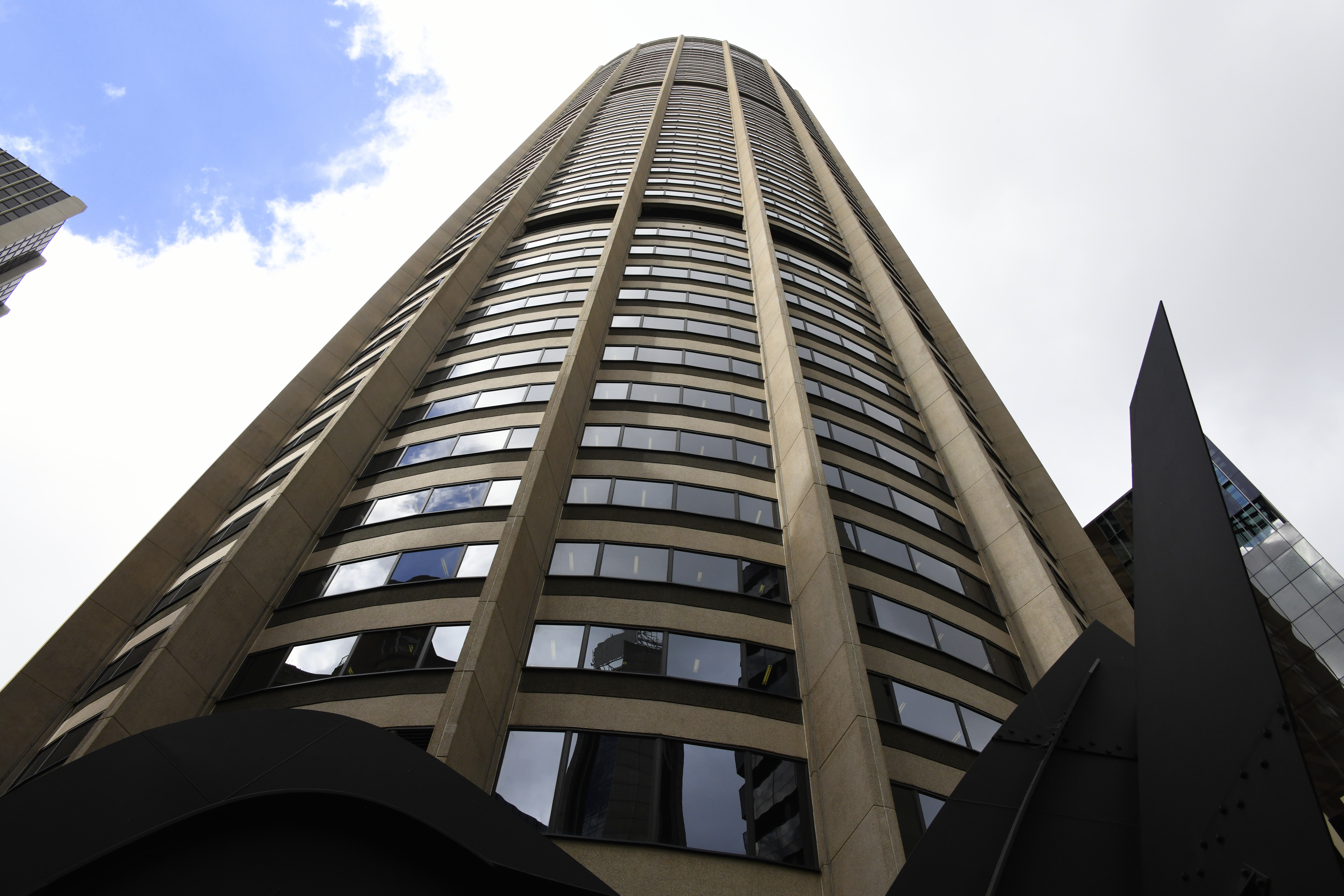
2012 Award, Australia Square, Sydney, built 1968

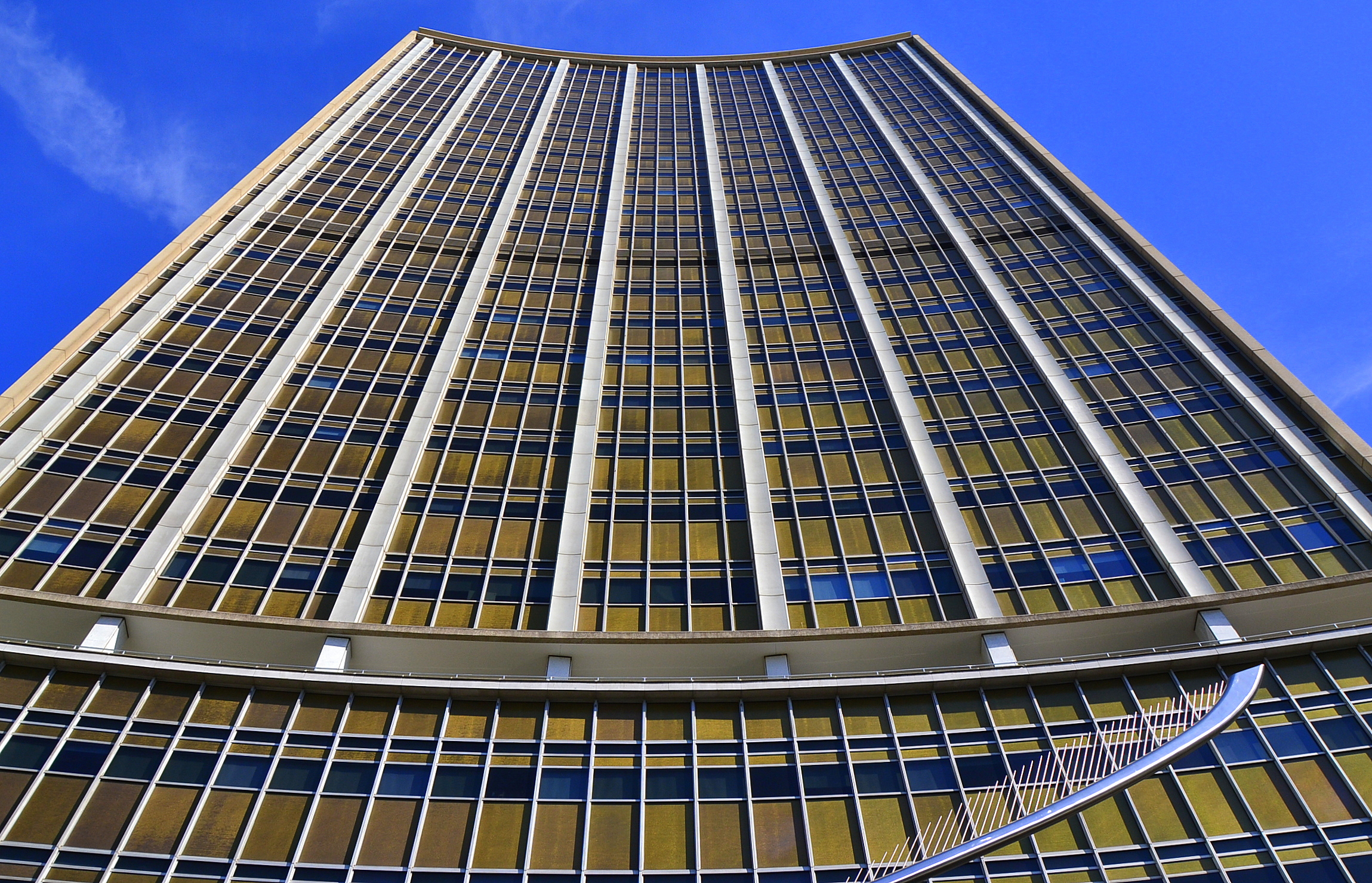
2013 Award, AMP Building, Circular Quay, built 1962

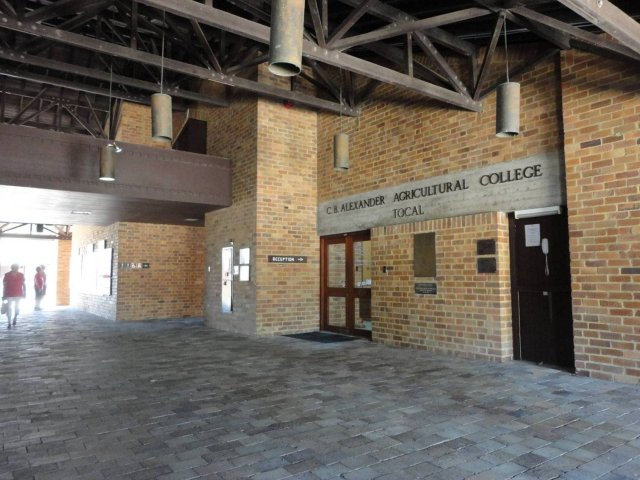
2014 Award, Tocal College, Hunter Valley, built 1963

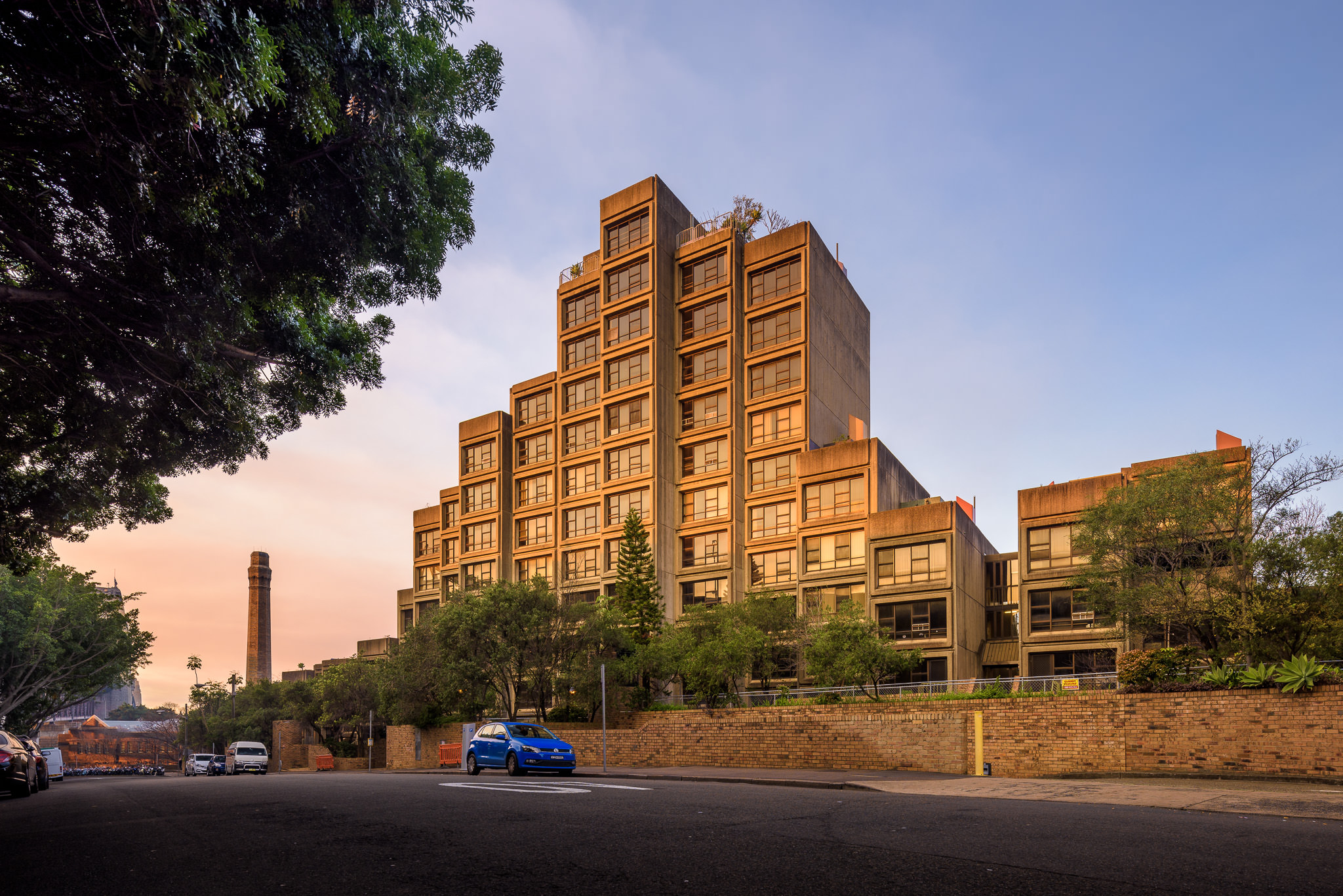
2018 Award, Sirius Public Housing, The Rocks, Sydney, built 1980

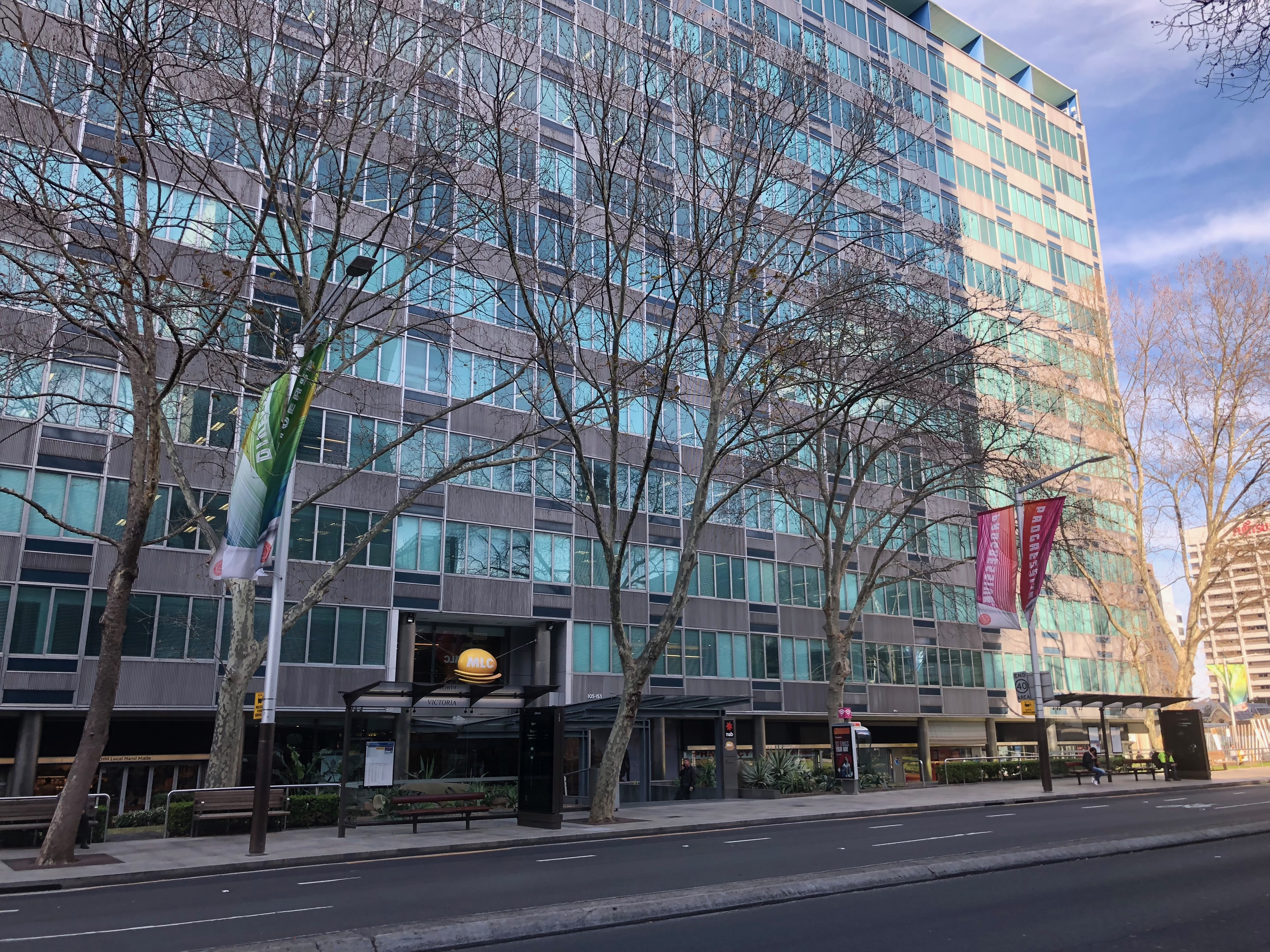
2021 Award, MLC Building, North Sydney, built 1957

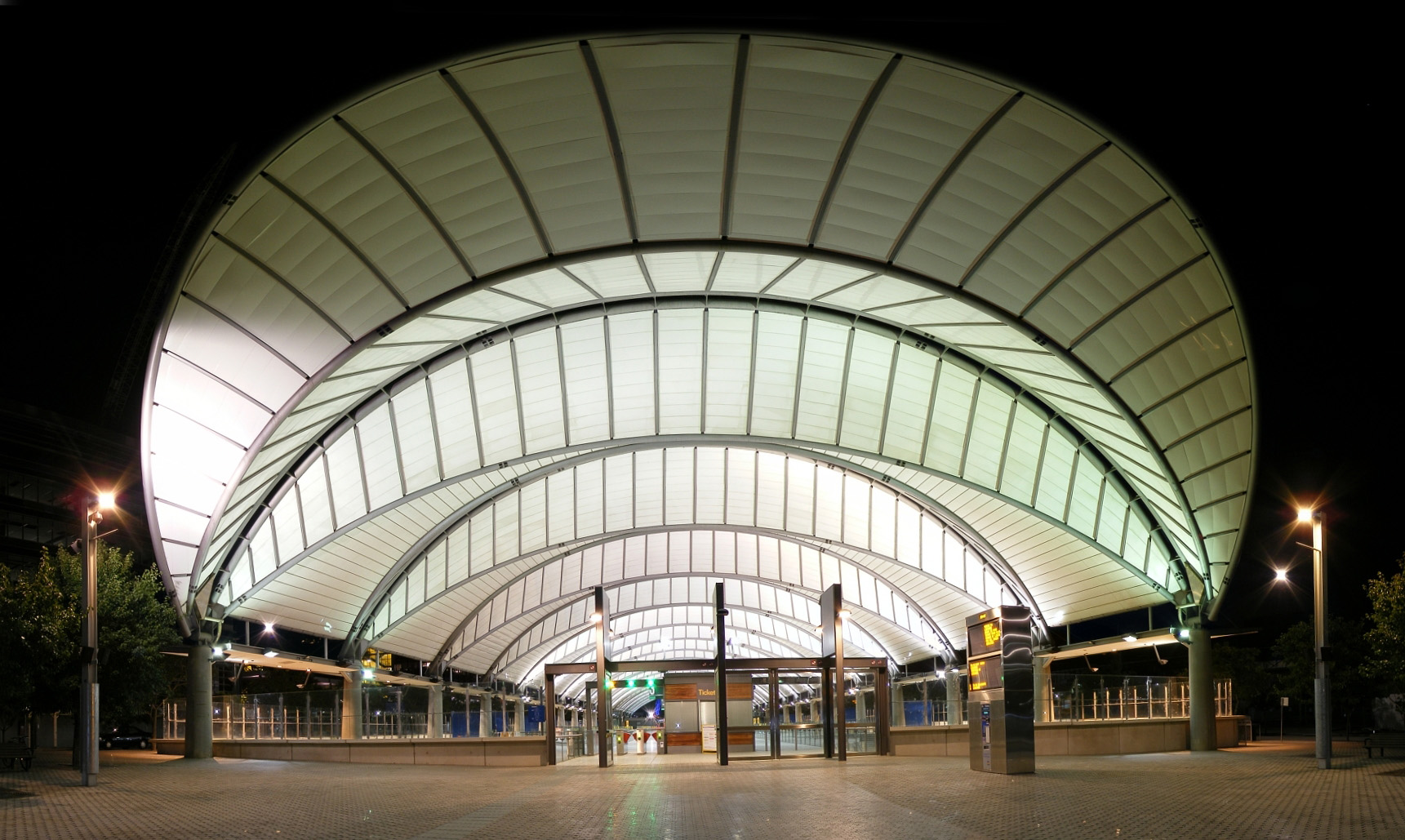
2023 Award, Sydney Olympic Park Station, opened 1998

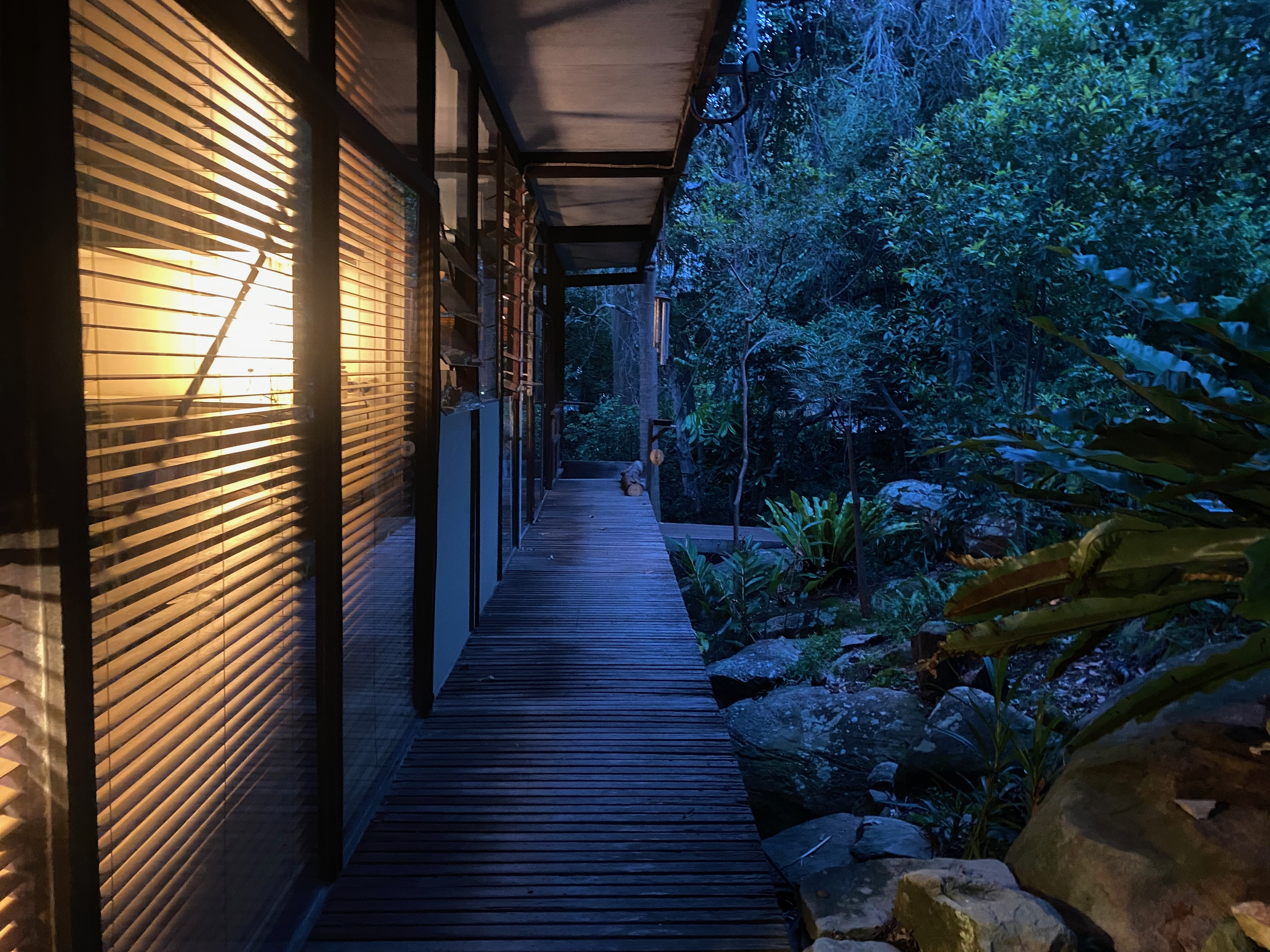
2024 Award, The Glass House, built 1957

== See also ==
- Australian Institute of Architects Awards and Prizes
- National Award for Enduring Architecture
- Maggie Edmond Enduring Architecture Award
- Sir Roy Grounds Award for Enduring Architecture
- Jack Cheesman Award for Enduring Architecture
- Australian Institute of Architects
