= Jack House, Wahroonga =

Jack House
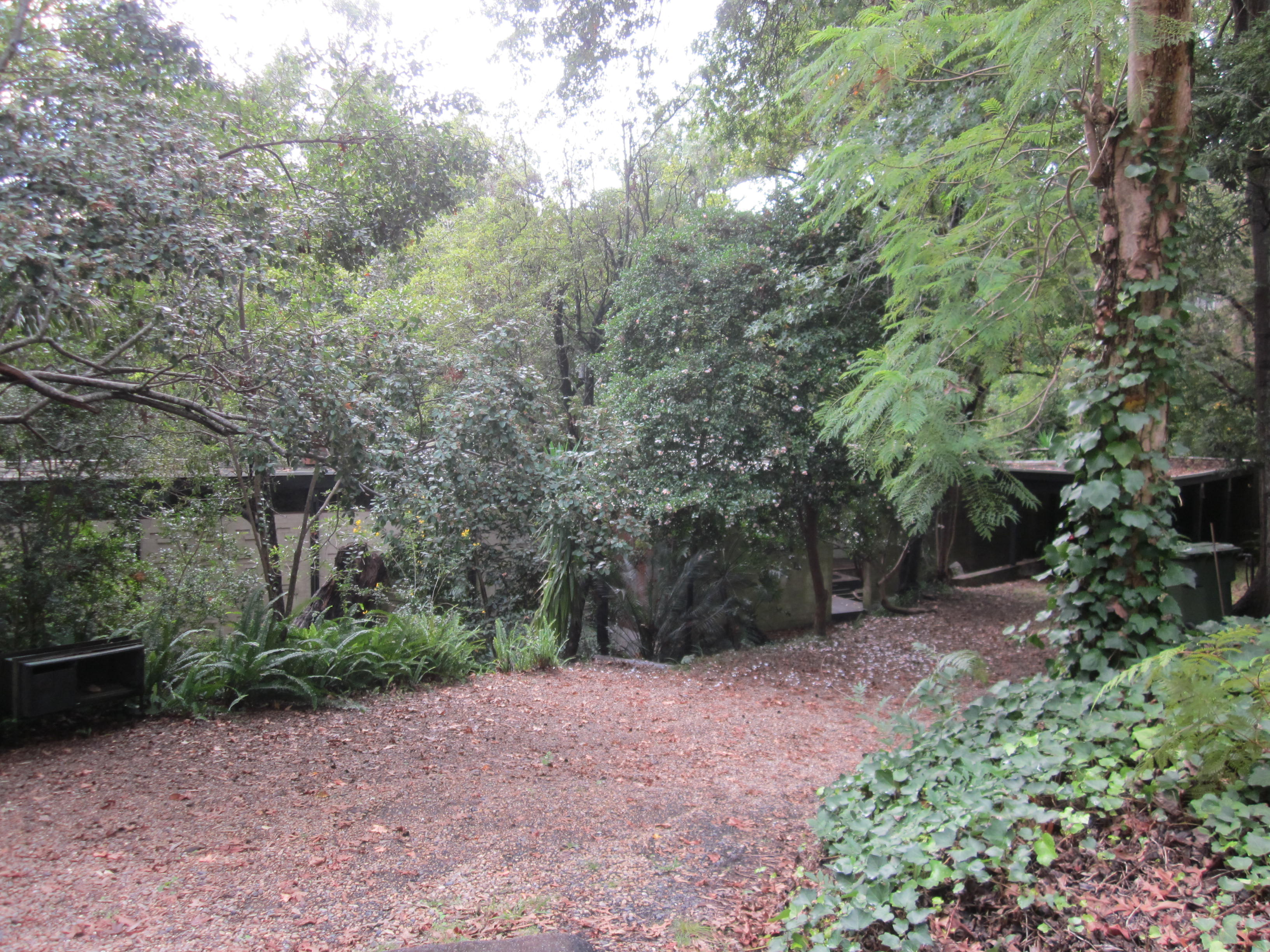
- Jack House, 62 Boundary Road, Wahroonga, New South Wales

- Location within Sydney Location within Australia
- 33°42′21″S 151°07′39″E
- Location: 62 Boundary Road, Wahroonga, Ku-ring-gai Council, New South Wales, Australia

History
- Built: 1956—1957

Site notes
- Architects: Russell Jack; Pamela Jack

New South Wales Heritage Register
- Official name: Jack House
- Type: State heritage (built)
- Designated: 24 June 2013
- Reference no.: 1910
- Type: House
- Category: Residential buildings (private)
- Builders: Donald W Taylor (Bob Ellis?)

The Jack House is a heritage-listed domestic dwelling at 62 Boundary Road, in the Sydney suburb of Wahroonga, New South Wales, Australia. It was designed by Russell Jack and Pamela Jack and built from 1956 to 1957 by Donald W. Taylor. It was added to the New South Wales State Heritage Register on 24 June 2013.

== History ==
=== Indigenous history ===
Material in rock shelters reveals that Aboriginal people inhabited the Sydney region at least from the last ice age over 20,000 years ago. "Kuringgai" was the language spoken on the North Shore. Although British colonisers originally chose the south side of the harbour for the settlement of the First Fleet in 1788, both the Darug people of the southern shores and the Ku-ring-gai people on the northern shores suffered catastrophic loss of life in the smallpox epidemic that soon swept through the indigenous population, with a death rate estimated to have been between 50 and 90 per cent. Over the following century there were numerous documentary recordings of the movements of surviving Kuringgai people within the Ku-ring-gai locality, both attending Aboriginal gatherings and collecting European rations such as blankets. There are also several oral history accounts of small clans travelling through the district in the late nineteenth century. Aboriginal people continue to live within the municipality.

=== Ku-ring-gai area history ===
One of first white settlers in the Kuringgai area was William Henry who farmed land next to the Lane Cove River from 1814. The early European colonisers consisted of itinerant workers, timber-getters, farmers and orchardists, self-sufficient people who often lived in isolated communities.

Major transport routes by land and water were in place by the mid-1800s. The construction of the railway in 1890 and the introduction of local government to the area quickly led to the transformation of this series of isolated farming communities into a line of sought-after suburbs. The interwar period (between 1918 and 1939) saw vast improvements in infrastructure and a period of urban consolidation. Almost all of Ku-ring-gai was designated for residential development as opposed to commercial and industrial developments, and very few blocks of flats were permitted before 1940.

The period between 1950 and 1980 was marked by a doubling in Ku-ring-gai's population from roughly 50,000 to 100,000 as part of the post-war expansion of Australian cities. The increase since 1980 to around 110,000 has been less rapid.

=== Jack House ===
62 Boundary Road, Wahroonga is part of what was previously a 810 hectares (2,000 acres) grant to John Terry Hughes in 1842. Hughes was shortly afterwards declared bankrupt. The land was purchased by the Mayor of Glen Innes, Valentine Sachs in the 1890s with the proceeds from his mining ventures.

When Russell and Pamela Jack purchased the site from a Mr Wayland in 1955 the land was the last undeveloped block on the street. Jack believed it remained unsold because of the steepness of the site and the creek running diagonally through it. The site's location on the north side of Boundary Road meant the council restrictions were not as strict as on the southern side. The northern side permitted the use of timber construction and materials other than tiles for the roof. The Jack House has a flat roof of bituminous membrane.

The Jacks originally intended to construct a steel framed house along the western boundary but abandoned the idea due to the high cost involved. This change of approach, with the Jacks opting instead for brick and timber construction, led to a design that harmonised as much as possible with the existing site, even to the extent of accommodating the small creek. As well as the final design being driven by the challenging site, the Jacks also had a commitment to produce economical but human buildings. The war loan house (low interest loans for returned servicemen and women), controlled in both budget and size, reflected a change in direction by many architects during the period. In designing the house for their own family, Russell and Pamela Jack, combined post and beam Japanese aesthetics with North American influences of Frank Lloyd Wright and Richard Neutra, incorporating the natural aspects of the site, utilising exposed construction, natural materials and a modular plan.

=== 1950s Sydney architecture ===
Residential construction in Sydney after WWII was limited to residences using brick and fibro single, double or triple fronted bungalows, with pitched roofs and usually facing the street, regardless of the orientation. Each house was equally spaced from its neighbours in accordance with local regulations. At the same time Australian architects who had returned from Europe began to embrace the ideas of the modern movement and adapt them to suit the unique Australian climate and environment.

The "Sydney School", a term introduced by Robin Boyd in 1967 (and later classified by Richard Apperly as the Late Twentieth Century Sydney Regional style of architecture), refers to the architecture of the 1950s and 1960s that was concerned with aesthetics and a rejection of technology. In expanding upon the term, Jennifer Taylor identified the style as first being discernable in three Sydney houses, by Peter Muller, Russell Jack and Bill and Ruth Lucas. Although working separately from each other, they shared a sympathy of materials, economy and simplicity, with an appreciation of nature. They each drew inspiration from the sandstone outcrops of Sydney, water views to the harbour, and the steep terrain. A need for climatic appropriateness and an Australian style was being addressed through modest residential designs, such as the Jack House, using post and beam construction that fully explored breaking down the barriers between inside and outside, and achieving a harmonious union with nature. Sites that had been previously considered unusable, such as the Jack House site, were the ideal sites to utilise the cost-effective solutions of post and beams construction, which could be carefully places to cause minimal disturbance to the site's rocks and trees. An important precedent to the natural siting was provided by Sydney Ancher's Maytone Avenue houses in Killara, NSW (1948–49) where the natural rock outcrops were retained.

According to Jennifer Taylor, 1957 was a significant year in domestic design in Sydney. Three important houses were put before the jury for the Sulman Medal. All three of the houses were designed by architects as their own residences; Sydney Ancher's house in Neutral Bay, Bill and Ruth Lucas' house in Castlecrag, and the Jack House in Wahroonga. They were all post and beam structures and all expressed an increased awareness of the potential use of outside space.

The Jack House was most notable for its treatment of the site. The Jacks positioned the house perched on the brink of the two principal levels on the site and it is regarded as signifying a change in domestic architecture in Sydney in this regard. Faced with a difficult site that was densely covered with native trees and outcrops of sandstone, Jack House showed what was achievable within a modest budget and without making a significant impact on the site (AIA). The design incorporated the challenges of the site without removing them, allowing the small existing creek to run beneath the structure, and perching the house out over the slope of the site so as to sit amongst the trees.

=== Russell and Pamela Jack ===
Russell Jack studied architecture and planning at Sydney Technical College after returning from active service in the Royal Australian Air Force. Jack worked for Rudder, Littlemore & Rudder during his studies, and graduating in 1950 was awarded the Byera Hadley Travelling Scholarship. He sailed to England in 1952 and met his future wife Pamela Purves Lyttle (1928–2006) on board. Lyttle had graduated in architecture from the University of Sydney in 1951 and worked for the Commonwealth Department of Works in Canberra prior to heading overseas.

In England, Jack worked for Tripe & Wakeham and Lyttle worked for Stillman & Eastwick-Field. Like many young Australian architects, they travelled around Europe looking at buildings. They married upon their return to Sydney in 1954, and Russell returned to work for Rudder, Littlemore & Rudder until 1956 when he left to set up practice with Denis John Wigram Allen (1926—2022), which lasted until 1976. Allen and Jack were joined by architecture student Keith Cottier in 1957. The firm became Allen Jack + Cottier in 1965.

Upon her return from England, Pamela Jack worked for Baldwinson and Booth until 1958, when she went into practice as Pamela Jack Architect. She later studied ceramics at East Sydney technical College and established herself as an accomplished ceramicist. Russell Jack left the practice of Allen Jack + Cottier in 1976, joining the staff of University of NSW as a lecturer, becoming visiting professor.

Major works by Russell Jack include the Carroll House, St Ives (1959), the Palmer House, Turramurra (1959), the Waterhouse House, St Ives (1962), the Tuckson House, Wahroonga (1961), the Jacobs House, Wahroonga (1963) (Wilkinson Award), the Forsaith House, Pymble (1971), the Griffin House, St Ives (1961), the Selby House, Warrawee (1961), all in NSW, and the Cater House, Canberra, ACT (1965) which won the Canberra Medallion in 1965.

Jack House was the winner of the 1957 Sulman Medal for domestic design. The Sir John Sulman Medal for Architectural Merit in NSW is an annual award presented by the NSW Royal Institute for Architects. Established in 1932 by Sir John Sulman, the original award conditions allowed for domestic and non-domestic entrants. In 1960 a separate category was developed for residential design with the creation of the NSW Chapter Wilkinson Award. The Jack House was featured in Architecture in Australia, July/September 1958 (pp. 76–78).

=== Comparative items ===
- Sydney Ancher — Maytone Avenue Houses, Killara, 1949
- Peter Muller — Audette House, Edinburgh Road, Castlecrag, 1953
- Bill and Ruth Lucas — The Glass House, 80 The Bulwark, Castlecrag, 1957
- Arthur Baldwinson — Simpson-Lee House, Roland Avenue, Wahroonga, 1959
- Robin Boyd — Lyons House, 733 Port Hacking Road, Dolans Bay, 1966

== Description ==
The Jack House is composed of glass and brick planes, yet is defined more by the skeleton of the post and beam framing which steps down over the sloping site. The house presents a blank wall to the street but it opens up with large planes of glass on to the elevated verandah on the opposite, the north side. The floor on the uphill side relates to the ground level while that on the down side is freely suspended. The pattern of the elements of the dark stained frame against the walls of the white bagged and painted brick towards the street, and against the glass on the private side, emphasizes the order of the module.

The house is a single storey flat-roofed dwelling with extensive use of glass and brick panes utilising post and beam construction. The timber frames are set according to a 10-foot module, with this order being reinforced in the partitioning of the rooms and through the use of the dark stained timber frame against the white painted brick front walls. The building occupies a steeply sloped site with frontage to Boundary Road, with the house oriented away from the street and faces northeast towards the bush. A carport, also with a flat roof, is located on the south-eastern corner of the building. The carport is accessed via a driveway from the street.

Entry to the house is through an arched opening in a bagged brick wall that screens the house from the street. The archway was considered reactionary at the time, with modernity typically demanding right angles. Jack defended his design choice, reasoning "a logical, natural opening in a brick wall is an arch". The bagged brick wall protects the house's public face from both the street and the neighbours. A timber bridge provides access to the entry space from the carport and the street.

The house has a simple L-shaped plan, which centres on a small creek which runs through the site and becomes a hinge to the two wings. The entry space is at the junction of the wings. To the left is the family space, containing the living room, dining room, kitchen and study. To the right is the bedroom and bathroom wing.

The house was designed to allow for expansion with the growing family, facilitated by the use of non-structural internal walls. Despite its economical size, the house was intended to feel as "psychologically expansive as possible", using a free-flowing plan and floor-to-ceiling glass allowing the rooms to open to the bush. The house is a series of continuous spaces, broken up into specific rooms but without the use of interconnecting doors. The roof and floor planes extend beyond the glass line to increase the sense of space and create unity with the landscape. The same materials were used inside and out for the same reason.

=== Condition ===
As at 9 July 2013, the house and interiors are in excellent condition. The garden is a bush setting which is largely intact. Jack House is highly intact including some interior finishes such as wall paper and it retains its original bush setting with its creek.

=== Modifications and dates ===
Initially there was no door on the study, allowing the entire living wing to be open. A door has since been added, enabling the space to be made private. The veranda between the main living area and the study has been closed in and two bedrooms added. An initially external wall of grey weathered timber now forms the interior wall of the main bedroom area. All alterations were made by the architects who lived in the house until recently.

In the kitchen a set of overhead cupboards similar to those existing on the south wallnhave been added to the northern wall by the original architect. Otherwise all materials and finishes remain.

In the laundry the original washing machine recess and its adjacent bench were reversed when a new machine was installed by the architect.

== Heritage listing ==
Built in 1957, Jack House is of State significance as an excellent and intact example of the work of mid-20th century Australian modernist architect Russell Jack. An early proponent of the modern movement in NSW, Jack is attributed with developing the principles of the modern movement into a locally adapted, site responsive architecture which became known as the Late Twentieth Century Sydney Regional style of architecture. Together with Pamela Jack he designed a house which responded to its environment with sensitivity, keeping the natural bush as garden and retaining the creek that runs through the site. The house interiors include cabinetry designed by Jack, selected wallpapers and other furnishings of importance to the overall significance of the house.

The house is highly regarded by the architectural profession and is considered to be an influential piece of mid-twentieth century Australian architecture. Its research value as a resource that demonstrates many features of Late Twentieth Century Sydney Regional style of architecture and design in theory and practice, and its capacity to illuminate the work of Russell Jack is proven through the ongoing use of the house as a teaching tool. It is also of State significance as an excellent representative example of the modern movement adapted specifically for the Australian environment in a domestic dwelling with intact interiors and garden setting. It is also a rare surviving and intact example of an award-winning mid twentieth century modern house.

Jack House was listed on the New South Wales State Heritage Register on 24 June 2013 having satisfied the following criteria.

The place is important in demonstrating the course, or pattern, of cultural or natural history in New South Wales.

Jack House is of State significance for its role in the history of Australian architecture and house design. The house demonstrates mid-twentieth century architectural practice in Australia and particularly in the Sydney region. One of the early examples of the Late Twentieth Century Sydney Regional style of architecture, Jack House demonstrates the early application of the modern movement in architecture integrated with an Australian setting. An exemplary piece of modernism, the house reflects an increasing respect for the natural landscape in residential design and is indicative of the evolution of Australian architectural design in the mid 20th century.

The place has a strong or special association with a person, or group of persons, of importance of cultural or natural history of New South Wales's history.

Jack House is of State significance as the family home designed by and for Australian architects Russell and Pamela Jack. A highly regarded Australian architect, Russell Jackwas a founding partner John Allan and Russell Jack which subsequently became the firm Allen, Jack and Cottier; the practice continues to be one of the most successful architectural firms in Australia. The partnership of John.Allen and Russell Jack was awarded the Sulman Medal for Jack House in 1957

The place is important in demonstrating aesthetic characteristics and/or a high degree of creative or technical achievement in New South Wales.

Jack House is of State significance as a seminal work of residential modernism. The house design exhibits the influences of the work of Frank Lloyd Wright and Japanese architecture. Russell Jack, somewhat disappointed by European modernism, was influenced by Frank Lloyd Wright's approach and the nature focussed architecture of pre-War Japan. The house is modest in scale with a strong connection between the bush setting and the house, an honest expression of materials expressed through exposed construction, natural materials and a modular plan utilising a primary structure and infill walls. In 1957 Jack House was awarded the Sulman Award for architectural merit in the domestic building category.

The place has a strong or special association with a particular community or cultural group in New South Wales for social, cultural or spiritual reasons.

Jack House is significant at a State level as it is held in high esteem by the wider community for its cultural values. In particular Jack House is held in very high esteem by the architectural profession as demonstrated by how widely it has been published and through its recognition by the Australian Institute of Architects who have classified Jack House as nationally significant for its humanist sensibility and respect for the natural conditions of the site. The house is regularly used as a teaching opportunity by the owner and others and opened to the public as an excellent example of modernism in Australia.

The place has potential to yield information that will contribute to an understanding of the cultural or natural history of New South Wales.

Jack House has State significance for its research value as a resource that demonstrates many features of Late Twentieth Century Sydney Regional style of architecture and design in theory and practice, and its capacity to illuminate the work of Russell Jack.

The place possesses uncommon, rare or endangered aspects of the cultural or natural history of New South Wales.

Jack House is a rare and substantially intact example of an award-winning mid century modern house.

The place is important in demonstrating the principal characteristics of a class of cultural or natural places/environments in New South Wales.

Jack House is an intact mid-twentieth century modernist residence designed by Australian architect Russell Jack. The house reflects key elements of his work, including a modest scale and integration with the surrounding landscape and is a contributor to the Sydney School of architecture.

== See also ==
- Allen Jack+Cottier
- Australian residential architectural styles
- Sir John Sulman Medal
