= Wilkinson Award =

Residential architecture award in New South Wales

Wilkinson Award for Residential Architecture, Houses (New)
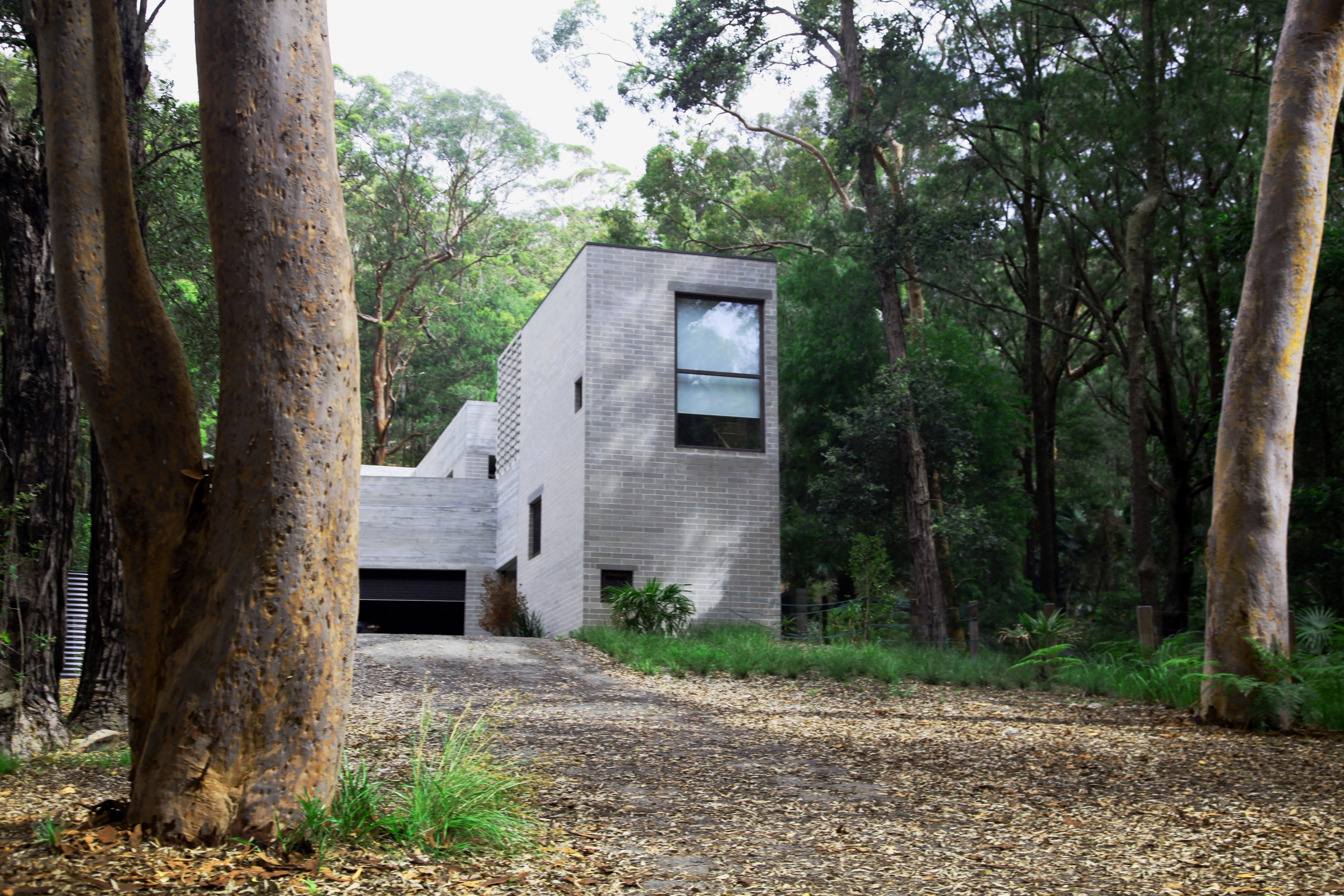
- 2021 Wilkinson Award, Pearl Beach House by Polly Harbison
- Awarded for: Residential Architecture, Houses (New) in New South Wales
- Country: Australia
- Presented by: Australian Institute of Architects (NSW Chapter)
- First award: 1961; 65 years ago
- Currently held by: Curious Practice, 2026
- Website: architecture.com.au

The Wilkinson Award for Residential Architecture, Houses (New) is an Australian architecture award presented by the New South Wales Chapter of the Australian Institute of Architects. First presented in 1961, the award recognises excellence in new residential buildings built in New South Wales, Australia, often for freestanding houses, but on occasion it has been awarded to multiresidential projects and alterations and additions. Since 2005 it has only been presented to new houses, with separate awards categories established for multiresidential and alteration and addition projects.

== Background ==
The medal is presented in memory of the Australian architect and academic Professor Leslie Wilkinson OBE, (12 October 1882 – 20 September 1973). Born in New Southgate, London, England he emigrated to Sydney in 1918 and became the first Dean of Architecture at the University of Sydney, School of Architecture.

== National Awards ==
Winners of the Named Award, Architecture Award and Commendations are eligible for consideration of the Robin Boyd Award presented later in the same year at the Australian national architecture awards, regarded as the highest award for new houses in Australia. Since 1981 a total of 10 Wilkinson Award winners have won the national Robin Boyd Award.

== Multiple winners ==
Glenn Murcutt has won the award on six occasions and Harry Seidler, Ken Woolley and Alexander Tzannes on four occasions each. Peter Stutchbury and Durbach Block Jaggers have both won the award three times.

== List of recipients ==
Wilkinson Award by year (reverse order)
Year	Architect	Project	Location	Context	Other AIA Awards
2026	Curious Practice	Cowrie Hole	Shortland Esplanade, Newcastle East	Coastal	
2025	Anthony St John Parsons	New Castle	Merewether, Newcastle	Coastal	Newcastle Medallion, 2025; Newcastle Residential Architecture – Houses (New), 2025; Newcastle Interior Architecture Award, 2025; Interior Architecture Award, 2025 (NSW); National Award, Interior Architecture, 2025; National Award, Residential Architecture – Houses (New), 2025
2024	Studio Bright	Maitland Bay House	The Scenic Road, Killcare Heights, Central Coast	Coastal	National Commendation for Residential Architecture – Houses (New), 2024
2023	SJB (Adam Haddow)	Waterloo Street	19 Waterloo Street, Surry Hills	Inner urban	Robin Boyd Award, 2023
2022	Sibling Architecture	Stable House	2 Wood Street, Forest Lodge	Inner urban	Shortlisted for Robin Boyd Award, 2022
2021	Polly Harbison Design	Pearl Beach House	Crystal Avenue, Pearl Beach	Coastal	National Award for Residential Architecture – Houses (New), 2021; Houses Awards 2021: New House over 200m^{2} — Shortlisted
2020	Chenchow Little	Glebe House	38 Ferry Road, Glebe	Inner urban	National Award for Residential Architecture – Houses (New), 2020; Houses Awards 2020: New House over 200m^{2} – Commendation
2019	Renato D'Ettorre Architects	GB House	1 Major Street, Coogeee, Gordons Bay	Coastal	National Award for Residential Architecture – Houses (New), 2019; Houses Awards 2019: Residential Architecture Houses, Commendation (New)
2018	Peter Stutchbury Architecture	Cabbage Tree House	Bayview	Coastal	National Award for Residential Architecture – Houses (New), 2018
2017	Durbach Block Jaggers Architects	Tamarama House	23 Kenneth Street, Tamarama	Coastal	Robin Boyd Award, 2017
2016	Smart Design Studio	Indigo Slam	63 Connor Street, Chippendale	Inner urban	Robin Boyd Award, 2016
2015	Peter Stutchbury Architecture	Light House	Dover Heights	Coastal	National Award, Residential Architecture – Houses (New), 2015
2014	Popov Bass Architects	Griffith House	Griffith	Regional	
2013	Drew Heath	Tír na nÓg	Mitchell Street, McMahons Point	Inner urban	National AIA Award, Residential Architecture – Houses, 2013; Houses Awards 2013: House Alteration and Addition under 200m^{2}
2012	Fergus Scott Architects with Peter Stutchbury Architecture	Cliff Face House	Palm Beach	Coastal	
2011	MCK Architects	DPR House	Darling Point	Inner urban	
2010	Alexander Tzannes (Tzannes Associates)	House	Bilgola	Coastal	
2009	Neeson Murcutt Architects	House	244 Whale Beach Road, Whale Beach	Coastal	
2008	James Stockwell Architect	House	Leura	Regional	
2007	Neeson Murcutt Architects	House	24 Preston Avenue, Five Dock	Suburban	
2006*	Luigi Rosselli (*Joint Award)	Mt Minderoo House	Mittagong	Regional	
2006*	Robin Edmiston & Associates with SYSTEMarchitects (*Joint Award)	Parish House	North Haven	Regional	
2005	Durbach Block Architects	Holman House	20 Hunter Street, Dover Heights	Coastal	Commendation for Residential Architecture, 2005 (National)
2004	Renzo Piano Building Workshop/Lendlease Design	Macquarie Apartments, (Aurora Place)	Macquarie Street, Sydney	Multiresidential	
2003*	Fergus Scott (*Joint Award)	Toumbaal Plains House	Yamba	Regional	
2003*	Stanisic Associates (*Joint Award)	Mondrian Apartments	2–4 Powell Street, Waterloo	Multiresidential	
2002	No Award				
2001	Craig Rosevear	Archer House	251 Whale Beach Road, Whale Beach	Coastal	Special Jury Award, RAIA National Awards, 2001
2000	Sam Marshall Architect	Marshall residence (warehouse conversion)	13 Sturt Street, Darlinghurst	Inner urban	Presidents Award for Recycled Buildings, 2000; RAIA Conservation Award, 2000
1999	Harry Seidler and Associates	Horizon Apartments	184 Forbes Street, Darlinghurst	Multiresidential	
1998	Durbach Block Architects	Droga Apartment	Foster Street, Surry Hills	Inner urban	Robin Boyd Award, 1998
1997	Alexander Tzannes	Snelling House — 'Perpetua'	9 Coorabin Road, Northbridge	Inner urban	Robin Boyd Award, 1997
1996	No Award				
1995	Glenn Murcutt	Simpson–Lee House II	Wynnes Lookout Road, Mount Wilson	Regional	
1994	Peter Stronach, Allen Jack and Cottier	Watsons Bay House	Watsons Bay	Coastal	
1993	Jim Koopman, Gordon & Valich	Palm Beach House	7 Northview Road, Palm Beach	Coastal	Robin Boyd Award, 1993
1992	Grose Bradley	Newman-Woodhill House	Coledale	Coastal	
1991	No Award				
1990	Alex Popov Architect	Griffin House	8a Rockley Street, Castlecrag	Suburban	Robin Boyd Award, 1990
1989	Lewin Tzannes	Holmes House	25 Ross Smith Parade, Great Mackerel Beach	Coastal	
1988	Alexander Tzannes	Henwood House	159 Windsor Street, Paddington	Inner urban	Robin Boyd Award 1988
1987*	Philip Cox (*Joint award)	Golden Grove Housing Estate (Public housing)	Forbes and Golden Grove Street, Golden Grove, Darlington	Multiresidential	
1987*	Ken Woolley (*Joint award)	Palm Beach House	21 Florida Road, Palm Beach	Coastal	Robin Boyd Award, 1987
1986	No Award				
1985	Glenn Murcutt	Magney House	Bingie Bingie Point	Coastal Regional	Robin Boyd Award, 1985; National Award for Enduring Architecture, 2011; New South Wales Enduring Architecture Award, 2011
1984	Glenn Murcutt	Ball–Eastaway Residence	Glenorie	Regional	
1983	Ken Woolley	Woolley Residence	8a Cooper Street, Paddington	Inner urban	
1982	Glenn Murcutt	Two Houses (Nicholas and Carruthers Houses)	Mount Irvine	Regional	Inaugural Robin Boyd Award, 1981; Blacket Prize, 1983
1981	No Award				
1980	No Award				
1979	Glenn Murcutt	Marie Short Farmhouse (Kempsey Farmhouse)	Kempsey	Regional	
1978	No Award				
1977	No Award				
1976	Glenn Murcutt	Laurie Short House	307 McCarrs Creek Road,Terrey Hills	Suburban	
1975—1970	No Award Laurie Short House and Douglas Murcutt House (both by Glenn Murcutt) awarded Merit Awards in 1975.				
1969	Philip Cox & Associates	Hawkins Residence	19 Norma Crescent, Cheltenham	Suburban	
1968	Ancher Mortlock Murray Woolley	The Penthouses	60 New Beach Road, Darling Point	Multiresidential	
1967	Harry & Penelope Seidler	Seidler Residence	13 Kalang Avenue, Killara	Suburban	
1966	Harry Seidler & Associates	Muller Residence	32 Beckton Place, Lilli Pilli	Suburban	
1965	Harry Seidler & Associates	Dusseldorp Ski Lodge (now Seidler Lodge)	8 Diggings Terrace, Thredbo	Regional	
1964	Peter Johnson	R.N. Johnson House	29 Greville Street, West Chatswood	Suburban	
1963	Allen Jack+Cottier (Russell Jack)	Jacobs Residence	36 Cleveland Street, Wahroonga	Suburban	
1962	Ken Woolley	Woolley Residence	34 Bullecourt Avenue, Mosman	Suburban	National Award for Enduring Architecture, 2022; New South Wales Enduring Architecture Award, 2022
1961	Donald Gazzard	Herbert Residence	12 Ellesmore Avenue, Hunters Hill	Suburban	

== See also ==
- Sir John Sulman Medal
- NSW Architecture Medallion
- National Award for Enduring Architecture
- New South Wales Enduring Architecture Award
- Robin Boyd Award
- Australian Institute of Architects
- Australian Institute of Architects Awards and Prizes
