= Lake Ainsworth Recreation Hall =

Venue in New South Wales, Australia

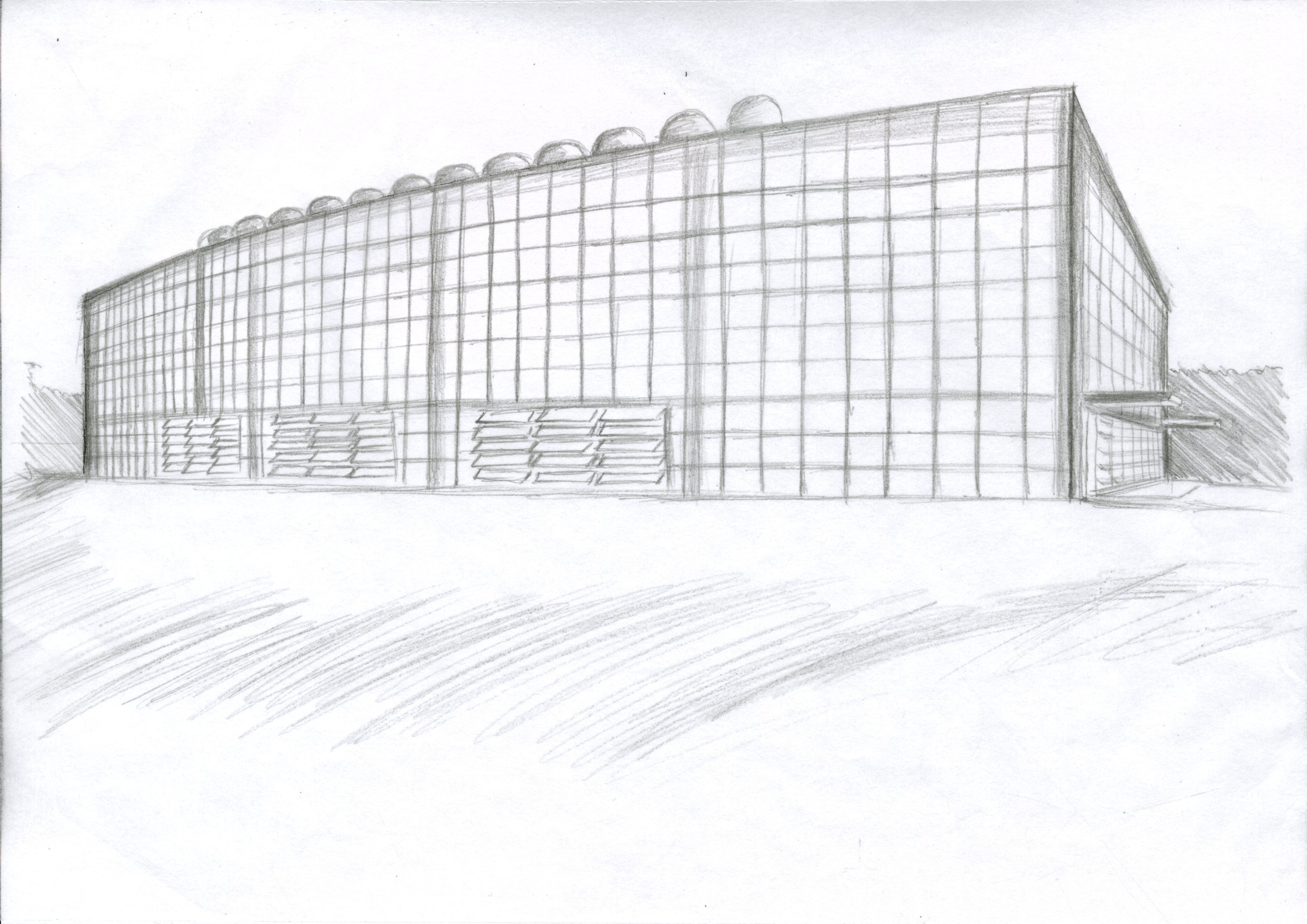
- Sketch of Lake Ainsworth Recreation Hall
- Interactive map of Lake Ainsworth Recreation Hall
- Location: Lennox Head, New South Wales
- Coordinates: 28°46′41″S 153°35′35″E
- Owner: New South Wales Department of the Arts, Sport and Recreation

Construction
- Opened: 2005
- Cost: A$2.5 million
- Architect: Allen Jack+Cottier

The Lake Ainsworth Recreation Hall is a multi-purpose recreation hall, used for basketball, netball, badminton and other sports, as well as meetings, films and theatrical performances that is located at Lennox Head, in Northern New South Wales, Australia. The building was designed in 2005 by architectural firm Allen Jack+Cottier, for which they received a Public Building Commendation, a Sustainabilty Commendation and the Blacket Prize in the 2007 NSW Architecture Awards.

== Material ==
Danpalon, a high tech polycarbon, was used for the walls and roofing panels, which allows for daylight infiltration. In addition, the solar transmission grade was to vary and suit the building's orientation. Less heat is transferred into the building and artificial lighting is not required at all during the day.

The floor system uses concrete slabs with sprung timber floor for basketball, netball, volleyball, and wall-climbing.
