= MLC Building, North Sydney =

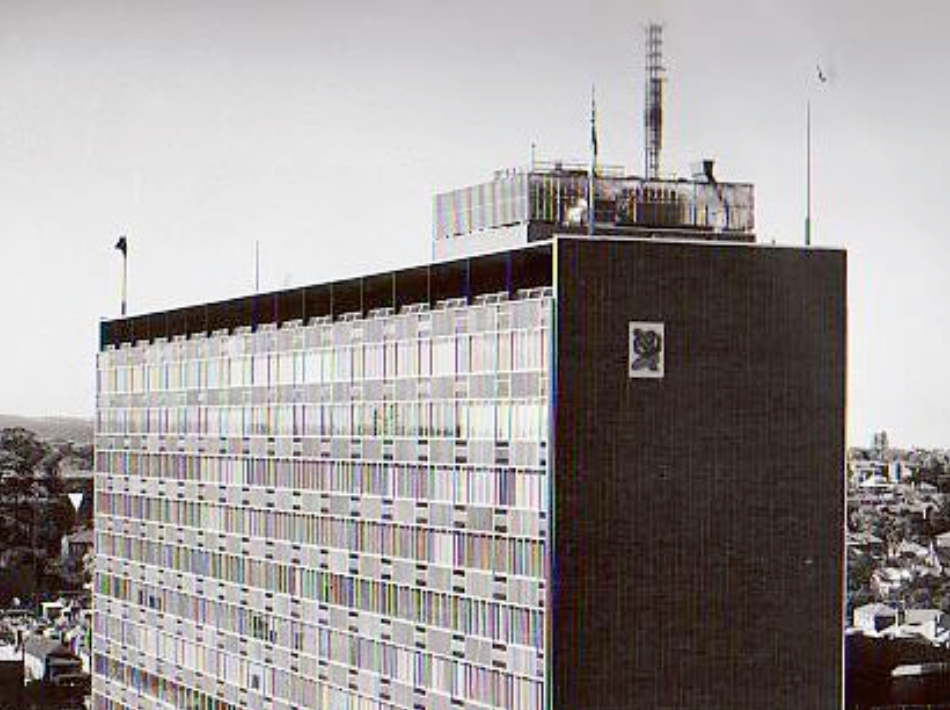
- Roof of the MLC Building, with the weather beacon on top and bas relief MLC symbol by Andor Mészáros
- Alternative names: Campus MLC

General information
- Type: Office building
- Architectural style: Post-war International
- Location: 105–153 Miller Street, North Sydney, New South Wales, Australia
- Coordinates: 33.8383253°S 151.2075512°E
- Construction started: June 1955
- Completed: 1957
- Opening: 22 August 1957
- Renovated: 2000–2002
- Owner: MLC Limited

Height
- Roof: 59 m (194 ft)

Technical details
- Floor count: 16

Design and construction
- Architect: Sir Walter Osborne McCutcheon
- Architecture firm: Bates, Smart & McCutcheon

Renovating team
- Architects: Bates Smart; Bligh Voller Nield

New South Wales Heritage Register
- Official name: MLC Building
- Type: State heritage (built)
- Designated: 22 December 2023
- Reference no.: SHR02069
- Type: Commercial offices
- Listing: NSW Government Gazette, No. 596 Heritage & Planning
- Builders: Concrete Constructions Pty Ltd

The MLC Building is a landmark modernist skyscraper in the central business district of North Sydney, on a block bounded by Miller, Denison and Mount streets. Planned in 1954 and completed in 1957, the complex was designed in the modernist Post-war International style by architects, Bates, Smart & McCutcheon. Its completion marked the appearance of the first high-rise office block in North Sydney and the first use of curtain wall design. Built to provide much-needed office space for the Mutual Life & Citizens Assurance Company Limited, the building continues to be primarily-occupied by its original tenants. It was added to the New South Wales State Heritage Register on 2 January 2024.

== History ==
By the early 1950s, the Mutual Life & Citizens Assurance Company Limited (MLC) had recognised that their existing 1938 headquarters on Martin Place was insufficient to their needs, at the same time as the company underwent a vast building programme, and in 1954 announced a new office for North Sydney. On the occasion of MLC's acquisition of a site in the North Sydney central business district for a new office complex, the General Manager of MLC, Milton Cromwell Alder, noted the future division of MLC offices in Sydney as a result: "the [current] position in the city [on Martin Place] is becoming intolerable because of traffic congestion, as well as the need to accommodate an expanding staff. The new building will become the head office, and will house most of the clerks. Most administrative and records work will be done there. The present building [on Martin Place] will be retained for executive headquarters and for dealing direct with the public."

MLC commissioned their preferred architects, Bates, Smart & McCutcheon, who had also designed their 1938 head office and with whom MLC would collaborate on the majority of their new office expansion programme, designing buildings in Brisbane (1955), Wollongong (1956), Shepparton (1959), Ballarat (1954), Geelong (1953), Adelaide (1957), Perth (1957), Newcastle (1957) North Sydney (1957), and Canberra (1959). The North Sydney MLC Building design, a 59 metre-high tower complex in the Post-war International style, was the result, with noted inspiration coming from Skidmore, Owings & Merrill's 1952 Lever House in New York and coming at the same time as the firm's design of ICI House in Melbourne.

It was noted on the approval of the design that the MLC Building, through its design and height, marked the change of North Sydney as a second centre of metropolitan Sydney, with the Mayor of North Sydney, William Henry Brothers, commenting that "The northern side of the harbour will eventually develop into the commercial centre of Sydney". The modernist design itself was significant, with its first use of curtain wall design, the first use of modular units in Australia and was the first high-rise building in Australia to have a public plaza. As a mark of its position as the tallest building in North Sydney, a weather beacon was installed on the roof by Standard Telephones and Cables. Construction work was stopped temporarily in February 1957 when an electrician fell to his death from the 14th floor. His fellow workers later presented his widow and children with a cheque for A£1,200.

Completed at a final cost of A£4.5 million the MLC Building was officially opened by Prime Minister Robert Menzies on 22 August 1957, who expressed that "The view [from the top floor] gives me such a new conception of Sydney that quite frankly I'm beginning to like the place".

In 2000, the facade was restored by Bates Smart (as it was known from 1995) following a conservation management plan prepared by Peter McKenzie alongside extensive interior renovations for a project termed "Campsus MLC" by Bligh Voller Nield (James Grose, project architect).

== Features ==
The building is a modernist, fourteen-storey (two below-ground) cubiform office block of 42,000 square metres (450,000 sq ft) of floorspace constructed on a rigid steel frame with hollow steel floors. Curtain walls of glass and anodized aluminium spandrels, with facing materials of terracotta, marble, granite and mosaic tiles. The MLC Building was Australia's largest office building on completion with over 42,000 square metres (450,000 sq ft) of office space.

== Heritage listing and conservation ==
The MLC Building is listed as an item on the North Sydney Local Environmental Plan 2013 as "The first high rise office block in North Sydney and the largest for a number of years after its construction. Seminal building on subsequent high-rise design in Sydney and utilised construction and structural techniques not previously used in Australia." It is also on the Australian Institute of Architects' register of Nationally Significant 20th-Century Architecture and the heritage register of the National Trust of Australia (NSW).

In June 2021, it was added to the New South Wales State Heritage Register; but, in July 2022, a court ordered that it be removed from the register. In May 2023 the Land and Environment Court rejected the development application. However, the NSW Government reinstated the building on the State Heritage Register on 22 December 2023.

In July 2021 the building was awarded the New South Wales Enduring Architecture Award by the Australian Institute of Architects, recognising its cultural and social importance to North Sydney and to the development of modern architecture in Australia, as a "a benchmark of innovative, practical high-rise design."

== See also ==
- List of tallest buildings in Sydney
- Architecture of Sydney
- MLC Building, Sydney
