= AJC Architects =

Australian architectural firm

AJC

Practice information
- Founders: John Allen (1952—1993); Russell Jack (1956—1976); Keith Cottier AM (1964—2008)
- Founded: 14 June 1952
- Location: Sydney, Australia

Significant works and honors
- Buildings: Jack House 1958, Cater House 1965, Clubbe Hall 1966, Rothbury Estate Winery 1970, Seymour Centre 1975, Penfolds Magill Estate Winery 1996
- Projects: Moore Park Gardens, 2000
- Awards: RAIA Sir John Sulman Medal (1957); RAIA Wilkinson Award (1963); Blacket Prize (1966, 1970, 1986, 2008); RAIA Canberra Medallion (1965); World Architecture Festival: Winner in Sport Category (2009); RAIA New South Wales Enduring Architecture Award (2025 & 2026) National Award for Enduring Architecture (2026); Keith Cottier: RAIA Gold Medal (2001)

Website
- https://architectsajc.com/

AJC Architects, formerly Allen Jack+Cottier and before that John Allen and Russell C. Jack, is an urban design, architecture, and interior design practice in Sydney, Australia. It was founded in 1952 by John Allen and Russell C. Jack, who were joined by Keith Cottier in 1964. As of January 2025, the practice is headed by director and CEO Michael Heenan.

== History ==
Denis (John) Allen began his own practice in 1952, and on 1 July 1956 formed a partnership with university friend Russell Jack, calling their firm John Allen and Russell C. Jack.

In July 1956 John Allen and Russell Jack formed an equal partnership. For the first few years their clientele was relatively small, limited to Allen focusing on some factory designs and Jack designing a few houses. Allen's pre-fabricated steel design for Wolfe Electric Tools Factory 1957, at Homebush was the basis for future industrial structures, notably Qantas, and Keith Cottier's Domaine Chandon California. In 1964 the firm was renamed Allen Jack+Cottier.

== Founding partners ==
=== John Allen ===
Denis John Wigram Allen (1926–2022) was born into an Sydney old legal family, Allens and his father had encouraged him to become a solicitor and was accepted into University of Sydney’s Law School in 1945. A year later Allen's interest in art and design prompted him to instead enrol in Architecture at Sydney Technical College. To gain practical experience during his six-year course Allen worked for Fowell & Mansfield until late 1948 and then for Rudder, Littlemore & Rudder. An economic downturn in 1951-1952 saw Allen redundant and lead to him to become a sole practitioner by July 1952.

Initially Allen limited his work to small-scale additions and alterations for friends and family. His first significant entirely new project was a house completed in Vancouver Street, Red Hill, Australian Capital Territory.

=== Russell Jack ===
Russell Callum Jack (1925—2025) was a contemporary of John Allen's at Sydney Technical College and with him at Rudder, Littlemore and Rudder whilst completing his studies. Jack aspired to be an architect from a young age and during his years in the Royal Australian Air Force he studied building construction and freehand drawing by correspondence.

Jack won many prizes after graduation, including the Byera Hadley Travelling Scholarship. In May 1952 Jack set off with fellow architects to London, where he worked for Tripe & Wakeham Architecture Firm for a few months. His work there included a harem for the Sheik of Kuwait. He also travelled in Europe. This experience developed and broadened Jack's understanding of townscapes and urban spaces. Upon his return to Australia he gained more professional experience at Rudder, Littlemore & Rudder for two years.

Jack's first major award was in 1958 with the RAIA Sir John Sulman Medal for his own house in Wahroonga, Sydney.

=== Keith Cottier ===
Keith Eric Cottier was born in 1938. He joined the firm in 1957, after Allen and Jack had recognised his architectural talent in his designs for Clubbe Hall. In 1964 the firm was renamed Allen Jack+Cottier.

In 2001 Cottier was awarded the Royal Australian Institute of Architects Gold Medal.

Cottier was appointed a Member of the Order of Australia in 2004 for service to architecture as a member of a range of planning, heritage protection and property management organisations, and as a practising architect. Cottier was awarded an honorary Doctor of Science in Architecture (honoris causa) at the Faculty of Architecture, Design and Planning graduation ceremony, University of Sydney 27 November 2009.

He was a trustee of Historic Houses Trust and a member of Sydney Opera House Eminent Architects Panel.

== The practice today ==
As of July 2025, Dua Green is CEO and director of AJC Architects. The studio is located in Chippendale.

== Notable projects ==
Notable projects completed by Allen Jack+Cottier include:

Project name	Image	Year	Location	Description	Notes
Jack House		1958	Wahroonga	Added to the New South Wales State Heritage Register; RAIA Sir John Sulman Medal (1958)	
Jacobs House		1963	36 Cleveland St, Wahroonga	RAIA Wilkinson Award (1963)	
Cater House		1965	145 Mugga Way, Red Hill	Added to the Australian Capital Territory Heritage Register; RAIA Canberra Medallion (1965)	
Clubbe Hall, Frensham School		1966	Mittagong	Blacket Prize for a Building of Outstanding Merit (1966); New South Wales Enduring Architecture Award (2026); National Award for Enduring Architecture (2026)	
Rothbury Estate Winery		1970	2213 Broke Rd, Pokolbin	Blacket Prize for a Building of Outstanding Merit (1970)	
Seymour Centre		1975	Cleveland St, University of Sydney	RAIA NSW Merit Award (1975)	
Apple Headquarters		1988	Frenchs Forest	RAIA NSW Merit Award (1988)	
Domaine Chandon California Winery		1990	Coldstream		
Wylie's Baths (restoration)		1994	Coogee	RAIA NSW Greenway Award for Restoration (1995)	
Penfolds Magill Estate Winery		1996	Adelaide	RAIA SA Merit Award, Recycling (1996); RAIA SA Merit Award, Commercial (1996); Master Builders Association (MBA), CSR Award, Excellence in Commercial/Industrial Buildings (1996); Australian Institute of Building Award – Outstanding Professional Excellence (1995); MBA, Ansett Award for Excellence in Heritage Work (1996)	
Moore Park Gardens		2000	Redfern	RAIA President's Award (1999); NSW Enduring Architecture Award (2025)	
Woollahra Council Chambers (restoration)		2001	Double Bay	National Trust Heritage Awards – Winner Adaptive Reuse, Corporate/Government (2001)	
Schaeffer Fine Arts Library		2002	University of Sydney	RAIA NSW Award for Interior Architecture (2002)	
Kogarah Town Square		2003	Kogarah	UDIA NSW Award for Excellence in Urban Development–Energy Efficiency (2003)	
Lake Ainsworth Sports & Recreation Hall		2006	Lennox Head	Public Building Commendation (2007) (NSW); Sustainable Architecture Commendation (2007) (NSW); Blacket Prize (2007)	
Rouse Hill Town Centre		2008	Rouse Hill	Lloyd Rees Award for Urban Design (2008); Walter Burley Griffin Award for Urban Design (2008)	
Berry Sports and Recreation Centre		2008	660 Coolangatta Rd, Berry	Blacket Prize (2008); Public Architecture Award (2008) (NSW)	
A1 @ SW1 South Bank		2009	Brisbane		

== See also ==
- Architecture of Australia
