= A1 @ SW1 South Bank =

A1
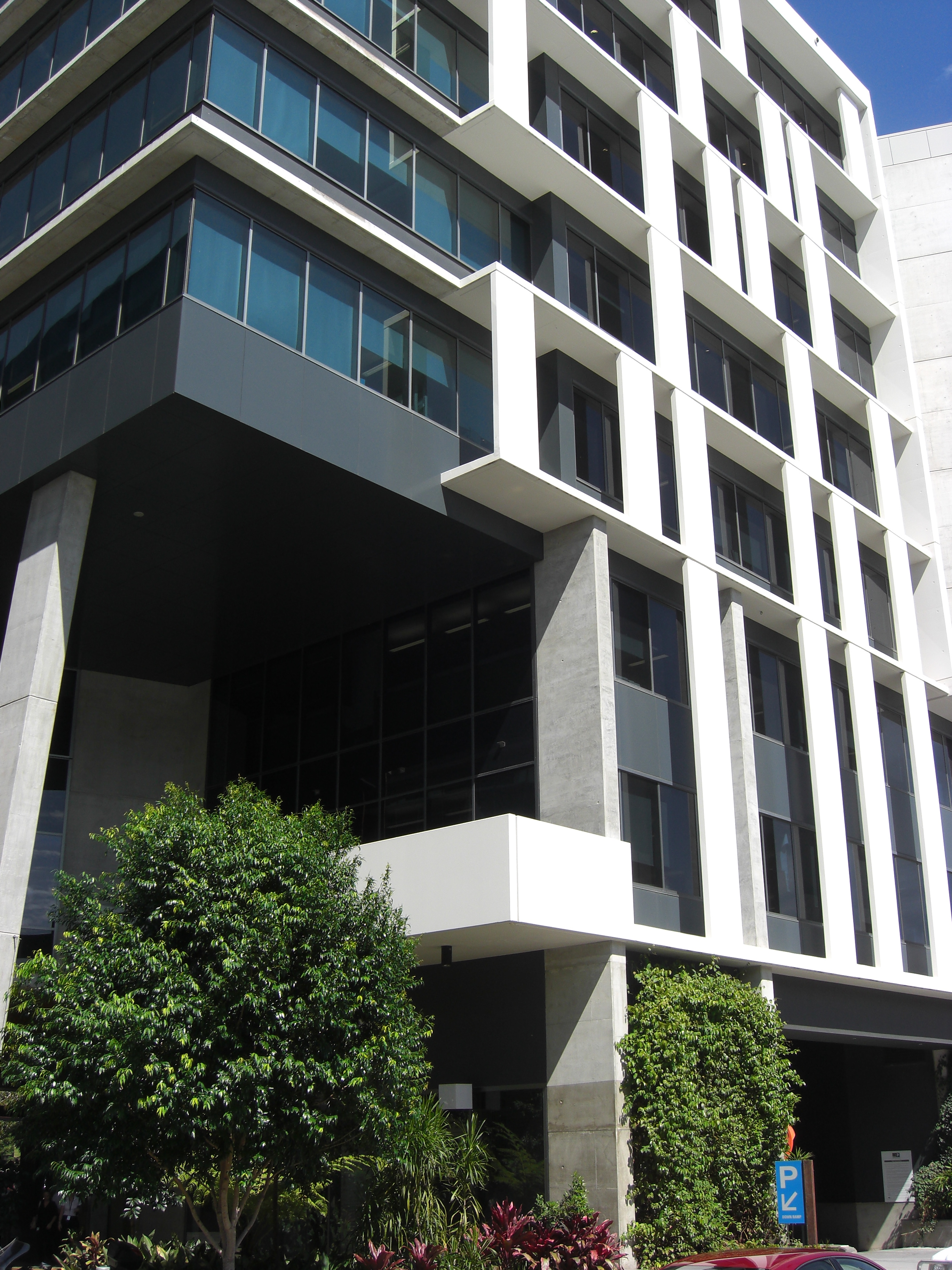
- A1 @ SW1 South Bank, Brisbane
- Interactive map of the A1 area

General information
- Location: SW1 site, South Bank, Brisbane, Australia
- Coordinates: 27.4757°S 153.0163°E
- Current tenants: Commercial/Retail/Residential
- Completed: 2009

Height
- Height: 180 metres (590 ft)

Technical details
- Floor count: 8
- Floor area: 9,900 square metres (107,000 sq ft)

Design and construction
- Architect: Allen Jack+Cottier (in association with Cox Rayner Architects)
- Developer: Austcorp

The A1 is an eight-storey building that is located at SW1 on the South Bank of the Brisbane River in Brisbane, Queensland, Australia. The building was designed by Allen Jack+Cottier architects, in association with Cox Rayner, and the building comprises ground floor housing retail and services and seven storeys above being used as commercial spaces. SW1 consist of six residential buildings and four commercial towers with retail nodes.

== Design ==
Landscape architects Gamble McKinnon Green designed the ground floor atmosphere to resemble the surroundings of a rainforest oasis. Fern trees have been planted along the pedestrian pathways and green vines climbs the wall of the A1. According to the architects, the ground plane is crucial as it has to attract people to walk through the space. A long pedestrian spine divides the buildings and allows the sun to penetrate at the urban square which is also along the thoroughfare. The pedestrian spine aims to connect the sense of open space in between the buildings and so that the surrounding buildings will not give a sense like the block is a block by itself but rather an open space block.

== Sustainability ==
Like other buildings located at the SW1, the A1 is given a 5stars rating for its energy efficiency under the Australian Building Greenhouse Rating (ABGR) scheme. The precast concrete sunblades and extended eaves reduce solar access that penetrates through the window. Rainwater collected from the roof will be recycled for toilet flushing and irrigation.

== Gallery ==
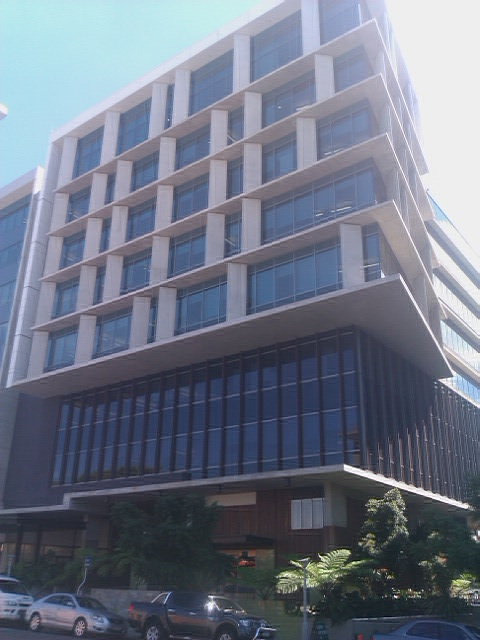
A1 @ SW1 South Bank, Brisbane

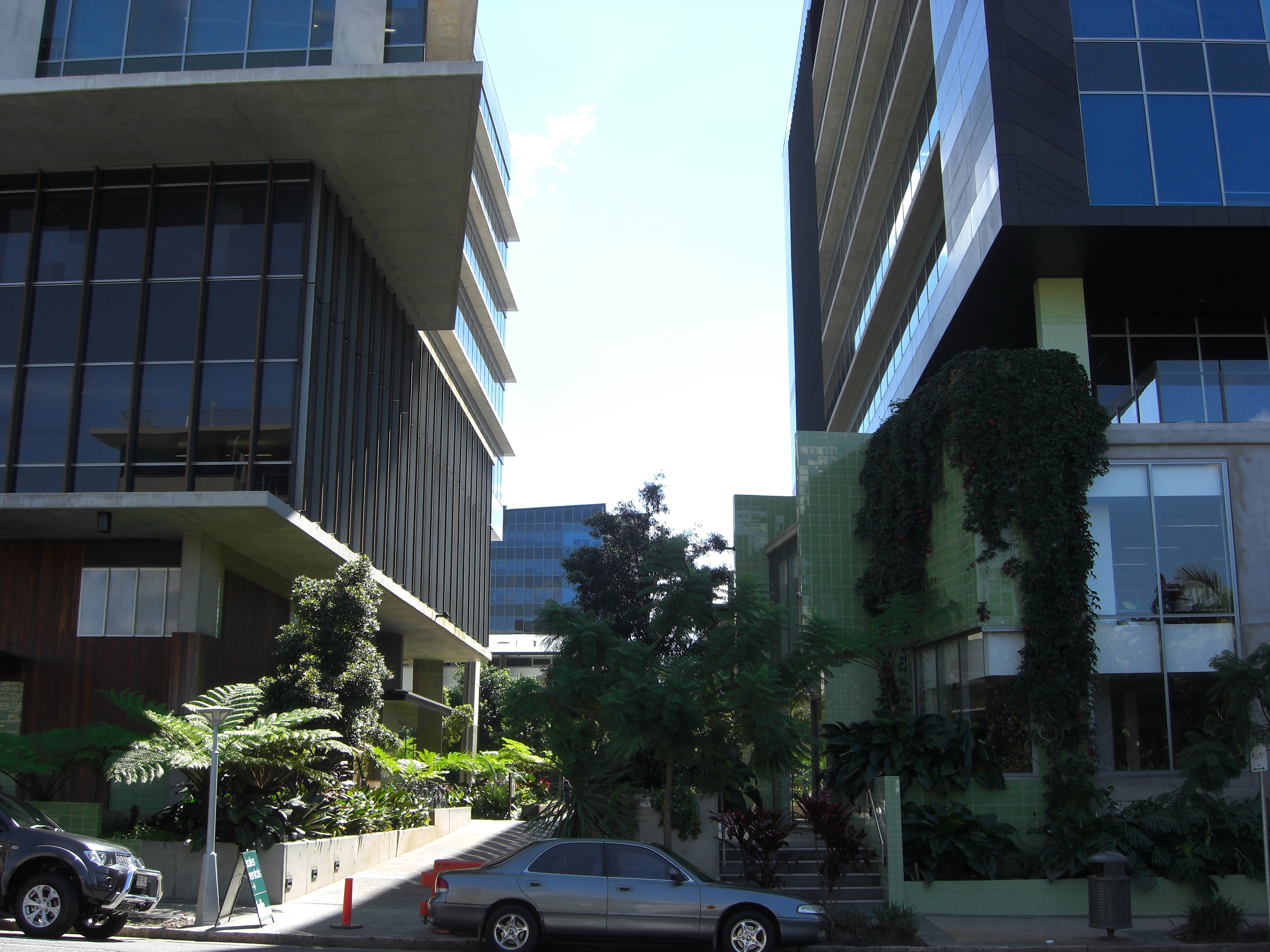
A1 @ SW1 South Bank, Brisbane

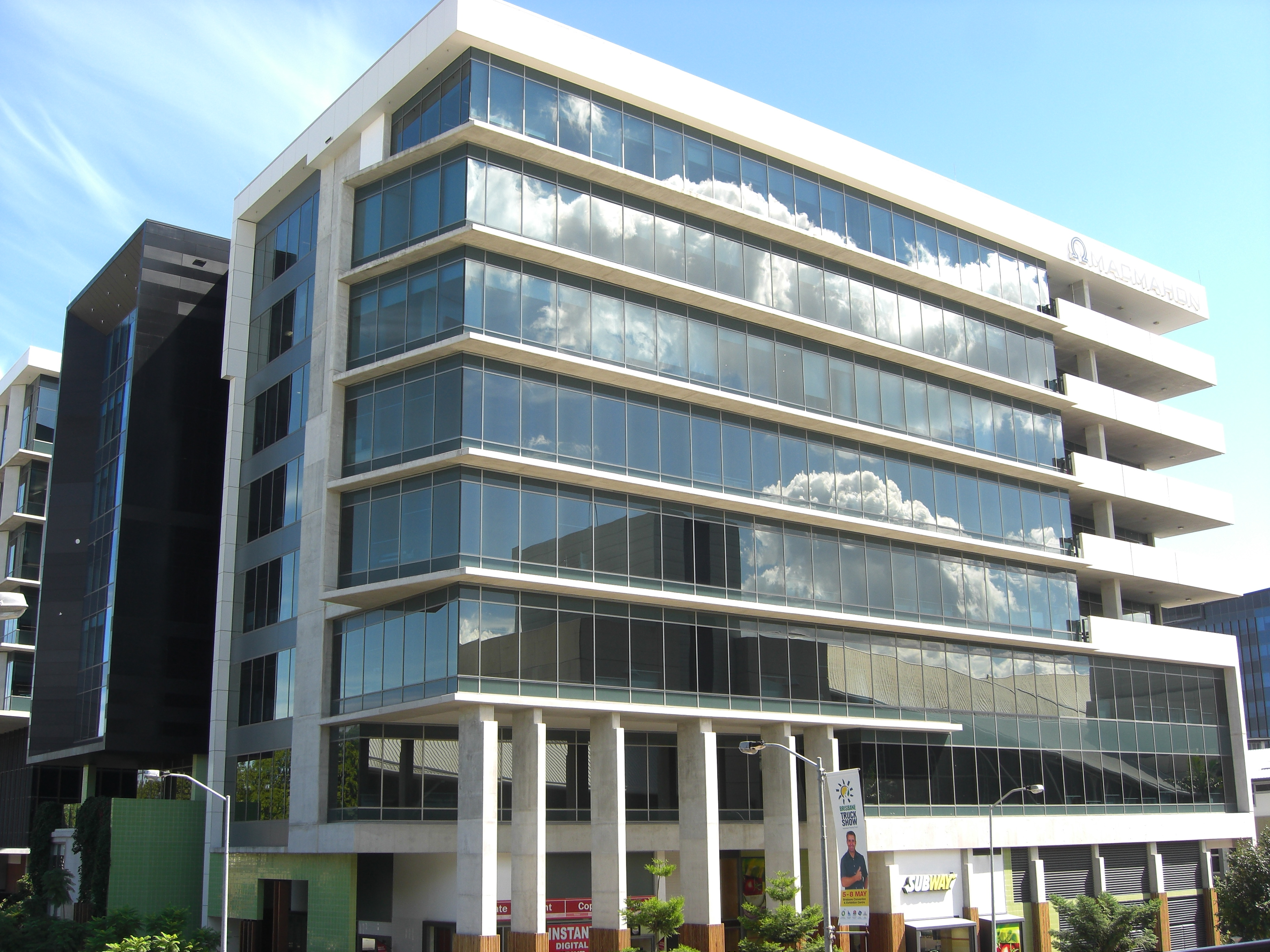
A1 @ SW1 South Bank, Brisbane

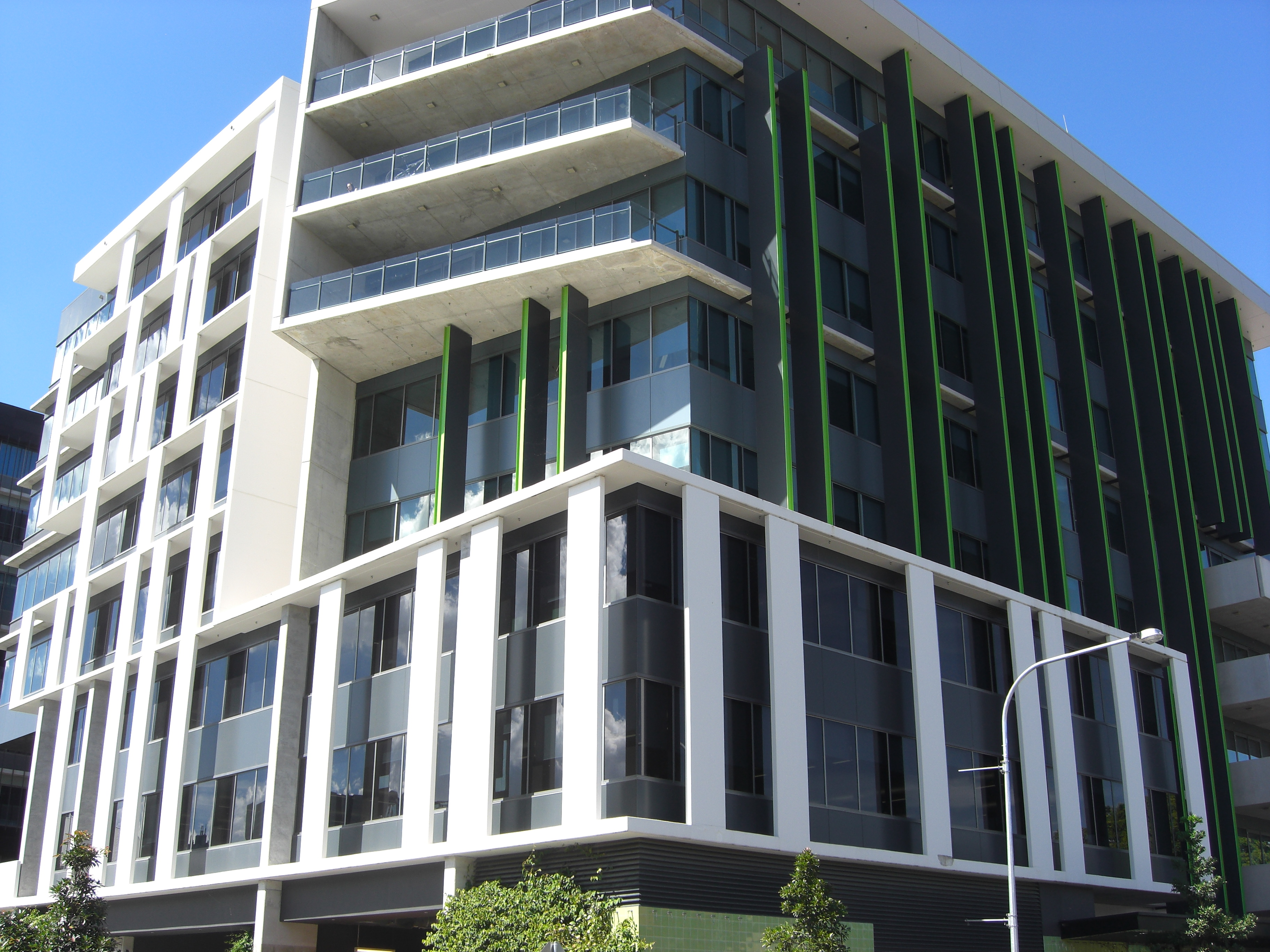
A1 @ SW1 South Bank, Brisbane

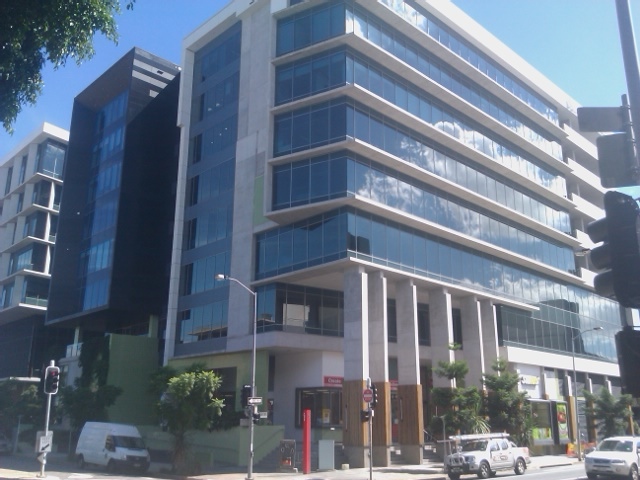
A1 @ SW1 South Bank, Brisbane
