= Richard Goodwin (artist) =

Richard Goodwin (born 1953) is an Australian artist, architect, and academic.

== Early life and education ==
Richard Goodwin was born in Sydney in 1953, and grew up in Beecroft. His grandfather was Edgar Oswald Stocker, a businessman and amateur filmmaker who worked with University of Sydney anthropologist A. P. Elkin documenting Aboriginal culture and life in Central Australia, and Goodwin recalls discovering piles of film canisters and Aboriginal artefacts in his grandfather's shed.

He attended Epping Boys High School, during which time he attended a career seminar by architect Harry Seidler, which inspired him to study architecture.

He began his bachelor's degree in architecture at the University of New South Wales (UNSW) in 1972. He took electives in fine art, and spent a year at the National Art School. He also attended sculpture classes at Meadowbank Art School under Alan Ingham.

In 2008 Goodwin was awarded a PhD in Fine Arts from COFA at UNSW.

== Career ==
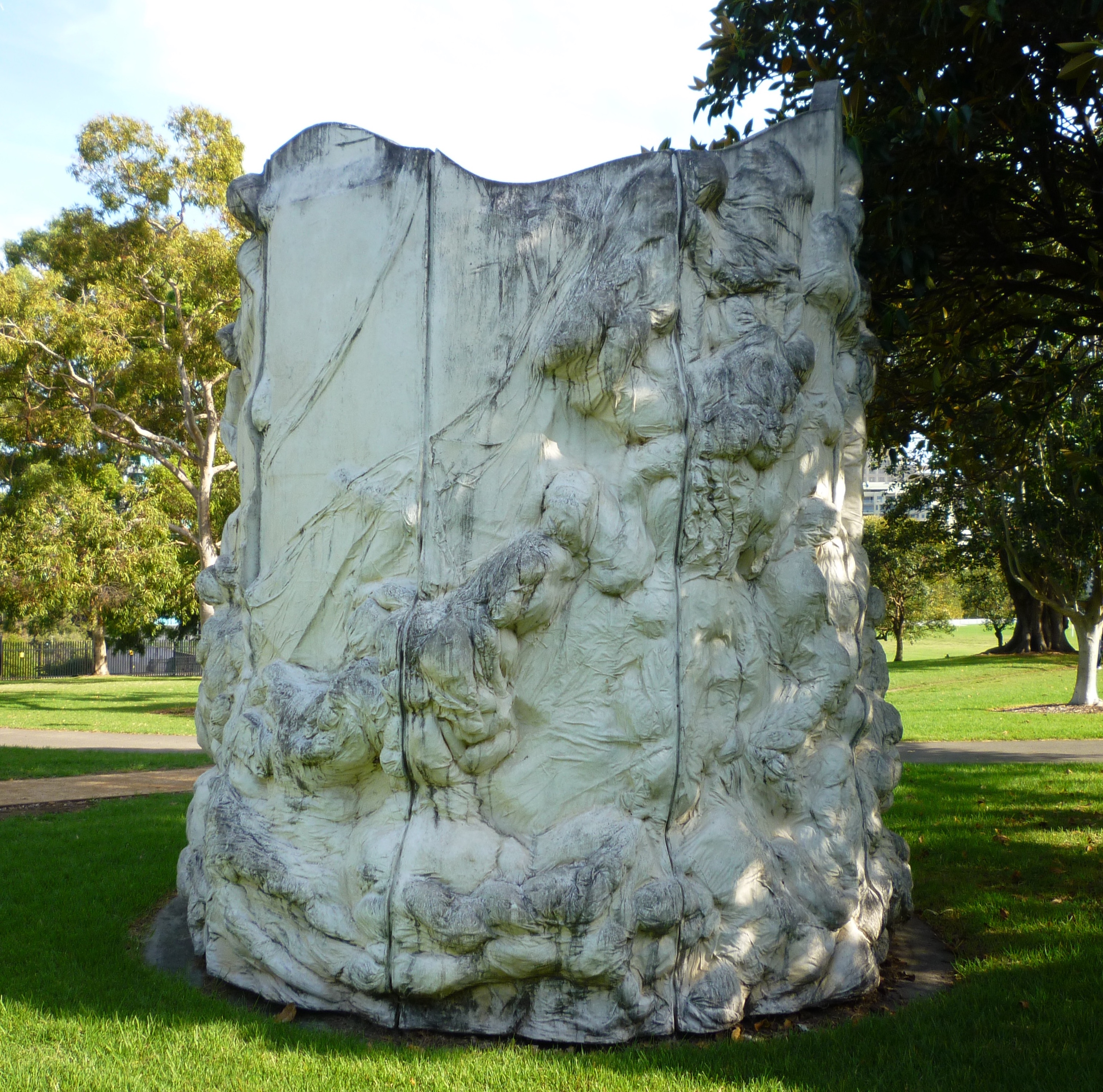
Mobius Sea by Goodwin (1986)

In 1996, Goodwin established the Porosity Studio at COFA. The studio enquires into the way patterns of inhabiting and moving through the cities weaves a level of political richness into the fabric of architecture. Since 2004 the studios have been supported by a number of cooperations, such as the British Council. They have been run as intensive workshops internationally in cities such as Glasgow, Cardiff, Milan, Beijing and Rotterdam.

The Australian Research Council's Discovery Grant was awarded to Goodwin in 2002. The research project argued for "Porosity" as a way of describing an urban experience which turns the building inside out and de-emphasises the obsession with facades. The outcome of the research opened up a new chapter in the way the fabric of the city is viewed by civic authorities. The ARC awarded Goodwin again in 2009 with a Linkage Grant to develop the research further through sensors and gaming engine technologies, in collaboration with Russell Lowe and the Emergency Information Coordination Unit (EICU) run under the NSW Department of Lands.

He was appointed professor of fine arts at COFA, UNSW, sometime after earning his PhD in 2008.

Goodwin is the director of Richard Goodwin Pty Ltd, a Sydney-based practice that has evolved from performance art to sculpture, installations, parasitic architecture, and freeway infrastructure. He regularly consults on major infrastructure projects such as bridges and freeway walls.

=== Practice ===
Goodwin's core agenda is creating what he calls "porosity". He argues, "Security seeks to close a city down. Porosity seeks to open it up. Somewhere between the two a solution must be found within our capitalist system. If we can't find the balance, they'll close the cities and cities will die". In practicing this agenda, he tests the functional and aesthetic boundaries of public space through both art and architecture. He has opened up new dimensions in the planning of urban spaces and the way architecture interacts with its physical and cultural context.

== Collections ==
Goodwin's artwork is held in major collections including the Art Gallery of NSW, Sydney, and regional galleries across Australia.

== Publications ==
Goodwin is the author of Porosity: the Architecture of Invagination and has published many articles on issues of public space, and chapters in collected works. Moreover, a number of articles and books have been published on his work.

== Recognition and awards ==
- National Sculpture Award (1985)
- Street Story Award for Glebe Island Arterial (2001)
- Sculpture by the Sea Prize (2003)
- Helen Lempriere Award (2004)
- Blacket Prize for Shellharbour Workers Club (2004)
- Commendation Urban Design award for RTA Prototype Toilets (2008)
- AIA Tasmania Chapter, Colorbond Award for Wing House (2009)
- Wynne Prize from the Art Gallery of NSW (2011)

== Personal life ==
His maternal uncle was sculptor Neil Stocker (1925-1969), who lived in England.
