= Blacket Prize =

Annual regional architecture award in New South Wales, Australia

- Awarded for: Architectural achievement in regional New South Wales
- Country: Australia
- Presented by: Australian Institute of Architects (NSW Chapter)
- First award: 1964; 62 years ago
- Currently held by: Dunn Hillam, 2025

The Blacket Prize for Regional Architecture is an award presented annually at the New South Wales Chapter of the Australian Institute of Architects awards for a building project considered to be the most exemplary of the year, located outside of the Sydney metropolitan area.

== Background ==
Originally named the Blacket Award when it was initiated in 1964, the name was adjusted in 1984 to become the Blacket Prize for Regional Architecture. Projects eligible for entry in the New South Wales Regional Architecture Awards are entered in to the Blacket Prize for consideration. The award is presented at the annual NSW Architecture Awards. Prior to the Blacket Award, the first regional project to be recognised was the Newcastle Incinerator, winning the 1938 Sir John Sulman Medal.

=== Naming ===
The award is named for English born architect Edmund Blacket (1817–1883) who rose to become the Colonial Architect of New South Wales (1849–1854) and later architect for University of Sydney. Whilst Colonial Architect he delivered many projects in regional NSW, including a lighthouse and numerous churches.

=== Multiple awards ===
The NSW Government Architect Office has won the Blacket Prize on seven occasions (1964, 1968, 1991, 1993, 1996, 2002 and 2015). The firm of Allen, Jack and Cottier has won the award on five occasions (1966, 1970, 1986, 2007, 2008) and Ancher Mortlock and Woolley were awarded the prize three times (1967, 1969, 1987).

The University of Newcastle as a client has been awarded the prize five times for campus projects: 1967 Union Building, 1969 Staff House, 1995 Design Faculty, 2003 Birabahn Aboriginal and Torres Strait Islander Centre and 2016 Watt Space Gallery.

== Recipients by year ==
Blacket Prize for Regional Architecture
Year	Architect	Project	Location	Type	Other AIA awards
1964	NSW Government Architect; EH (Ted) Farmer, Project Architect: Michael Dysart	Taree Technical College	Taree	Education	
1965	Ian McKay and Philip Cox; Architects in Association	Tocal College (C.B. Alexander Presbyterian Agricultural College)	815 Tocal Road, Paterson	Education	Sulman Medal, 1965; National Award for Enduring Architecture, 2014; New South Wales Enduring Architecture Award, 2014
1966	Allen, Jack and Cottier	Clubbe Hall, Frensham School	Waverley Parade and Range Road, Mittagong	Education	New South Wales Enduring Architecture Award, 2026; National Award for Enduring Architecture, 2026
1967	Ancher, Mortlock, Murray and Woolley	Union Building (Shortland Building)	Shortland Lane, Callaghan, University of Newcastle	Education	
1968	NSW Government Architect; EH (Ted) Farmer, Project Architect: David Turner (joint winner)	Albury Government Offices	516 Dean Street, Albury	Commercial	
1968	Edwards Madigan Torzillo & Partners (joint winner)	Warren Library	69 Dubbo Street, Warren	Cultural	
1969	Ancher, Mortlock, Murray and Woolley	Staff House, University of Newcastle	Shortland Lane, Callaghan, Newcastle	Education	
1970	Allen, Jack and Cottier	Rothbury Estate Winery	2213 Broke Road, Pokolbin	Commercial	
1977	Glenn Murcutt	Kempsey Farmhouse (Marie Short House)	Kempsey	Residential	Wilkinson Award, 1979; National Award for Enduring Architecture, 2004; New South Wales Enduring Architecture Award, 2004
1980	Brian Suters	Suters Residence	87 Wolfe Street, The Hill, Newcastle	Residential	
1983	Glenn Murcutt	Two Houses (Nicholas and Carruthers Houses)	Mount Irvine	Residential	Robin Boyd Award, 1981; Wilkinson Award, 1982
1986	Allen, Jack and Cottier	Claremont Residence	Bellingen	Residential	
1987	Ancher, Mortlock and Woolley	The Anchorage, Townhouse & Unit Development	Tweed Heads	Residential	
1988	Travis Partners	Shortland Electricity Administration Headquarters (now Ausgrid)	145 Newcastle Road, Wallsend	Commercial	
1991	NSW Government Architect; Lindsay Kelly, Project Architect: Olga Kosterin	Aboriginal Cultural Museum	Darling Street, Brewarrina	Cultural	
1992	Robert Pullar, Kendale Architect Design	Matcham House	Matcham	Residential	
1993	NSW Government Architect; Lindsay Kelly and Rebecca Hearty, Public Works Department in association with Campbell Luscombe Associates	Wyong Court House	6 Anzac Avenue, Wyong	Public	
1995	Stutchbury and Pape/EJE Architecture	Design Faculty Building	University of Newcastle, Newcastle	Education	
1996	NSW Government Architect; Lindsay Kelly, Public Works Department in association with Conrad & Gargett	Coffs Harbour Education Campus	Coffs Harbour	Education	
1997	Rod Seymour Architects	House for 5	Dudley	Residential	
1998	Alec Tzannes Associates	Kronenberg House	Killcare	Residential	
1999	Terry Dorrough	Dangar Island House	14 Riverview Avenue, Dangar Island	Residential	
2000	Mason Architects (Donald Mason)	Blue Mountains River Run	Megalong Valley	Commercial	
2001	Harry Seidler & Associates	Southern Highlands House	612 Richards Lane, Joadja	Residential	
2002	NSW Government Architect; Chris Johnson with Merrima Aboriginal Design Unit	Wilcannia Health Service	Wilcannia Hospital, Wilcannia	Health	
2003	Richard Leplastrier, Peter Stutchbury and Sue Harper	Birabahn Aboriginal and Torres Strait Islander Centre	University of Newcastle, Newcastle	Education	
2004	Caroline Pidcock Architects and Richard Goodwin Architects	Shellharbour Workers Club	Corner Wattle & Shellharbour Roads, Shellharbour	Commercial	
2005	Stutchbury and Pape	Deepwater Woolshed	Bulls Run Station, Old Narrandera Rd, Currawarna, Wagga Wagga	Agricultural	Commercial Architecture Award, 2005 (National, Joint Winner); Colorbond Steel Award, 2005 (National)
2006	Stutchbury and Pape	Bangalay	Upper Kangaroo Valley	Residential	Commendation, Robin Boyd Award, 2006; New Housing Architecture Award, 2006
2007	Allen, Jack and Cottier	Lake Ainsworth Recreation Hall	Pacific Parade, Lennox Head	Recreation	Public Building Commendation, 2007 (NSW); Sustainable Architecture Commendation, 2007 (NSW)
2008	Allen, Jack and Cottier	Berry Sports and Recreation Centre	660 Coolangatta Road, Berry	Recreation	Public Architecture Award, 2008 (NSW)
2009	James Stockwell Architect	Kalkite House	Kalkite Road, Kalkite, Snowy Mountains	Residential	Colorbond Award for Steel Architecture, 2009 (National)
2010	Tonkin Zulaikha Greer	Glasshouse: Arts, Conference and Entertainment Centre	30-42 Clarence & Hay Streets, Port Macquarie	Cultural	
2011	Austin McFarland Architects	St Joseph's Primary School Hall and Library	Church Crescent, Wingham	Education	
2012	Silvester Fuller	Dapto Anglican Church Auditorium	100 Moombara Street, Dapto	Religion	National Award for Public Architecture, 2012
2013	BVN Donovan Hill	Charles Sturt University National Life Sciences Hub	Charles Sturt University, Boorooma Street, North Wagga Wagga	Education	
2014	Fender Katsalidis / Mirams Architects	Garangula Gallery	1855 Back Jugiong Road, Jugiong	Cultural	National Interior Architecture Award, 2014; Interior Architecture Award, 2014 (NSW); Commercial Architecture Award, 2014 (NSW)
2015	NSW Government Architect	NSW Aboriginal Child and Family Centre (now Winanga-Li Aboriginal Child and Family Centre)	12 Hunter Street, Gunnedah	Health	
2016	Andrew Donaldson	University of Newcastle Watt Space Gallery	20 Auckland Street, Newcastle	Cultural	Public Architecture Award, 2016 (Newcastle)
2017	TKD Architects	Glasshouse at Goonoo Goonoo Station	13304 New England Highway, Timbumburi	Commercial	Sir Arthur G. Stephenson Award for Commercial Architecture, 2017 (NSW)
2018	SHAC	St Patrick's Primary School, Stage 1	65 New England Highway, Lochinvar	Education	Education Architecture Award, 2018 (NSW)
2019	Chrofi with McGregor Coxall	Maitland Riverlink	Maitland	Public	NSW Architecture Medallion, 2019; National Award for Public Architecture, 2019; Sulman Medal, 2019 (NSW)
2020	CKDS Architecture with Hill Thalis	Verve Residences	464—470 King Street, Newcastle	Residential	
2021	Crone with Urbis	Rocky Hill Memorial Museum	Memorial Road, Goulburn	Cultural	
2022	Cox Architecture	Eden Port Welcome Centre	Weecoon Street, Eden	Public	
2023	Brewster Hjorth Architects	Goulburn Performing Arts Centre	163 Auburn Street, Goulburn	Cultural	
2024	Sibling Architecture	South East Centre for Contemporary Art (SECCA)	Zingel Place, Bega	Cultural	Public Architecture Award, 2024 (NSW)
2025	Dunn Hillam	Ward Oval Pavilion	Maidens Avenue, Cobar	Recreation	Public Architecture Commendation, 2025 (NSW)
2026	Bokey Grant	EA House	Mittagong	Residential	Residential Architecture — Houses (New) Architecture Award, 2026

Note: the list of awards recipients from 1964 to 2015 is based on a review and timeline of the Blacket Prize published in the NSW Architecture Bulletin, 1 September 2015.

== See also ==
- Australian Institute of Architects Awards and Prizes
- Australian Institute of Architects
- Sir Zelman Cowen Award for Public Architecture
- NSW Architecture Medallion
