= NSW Architecture Medallion =

Highest architecture award in New South Wales, Australia

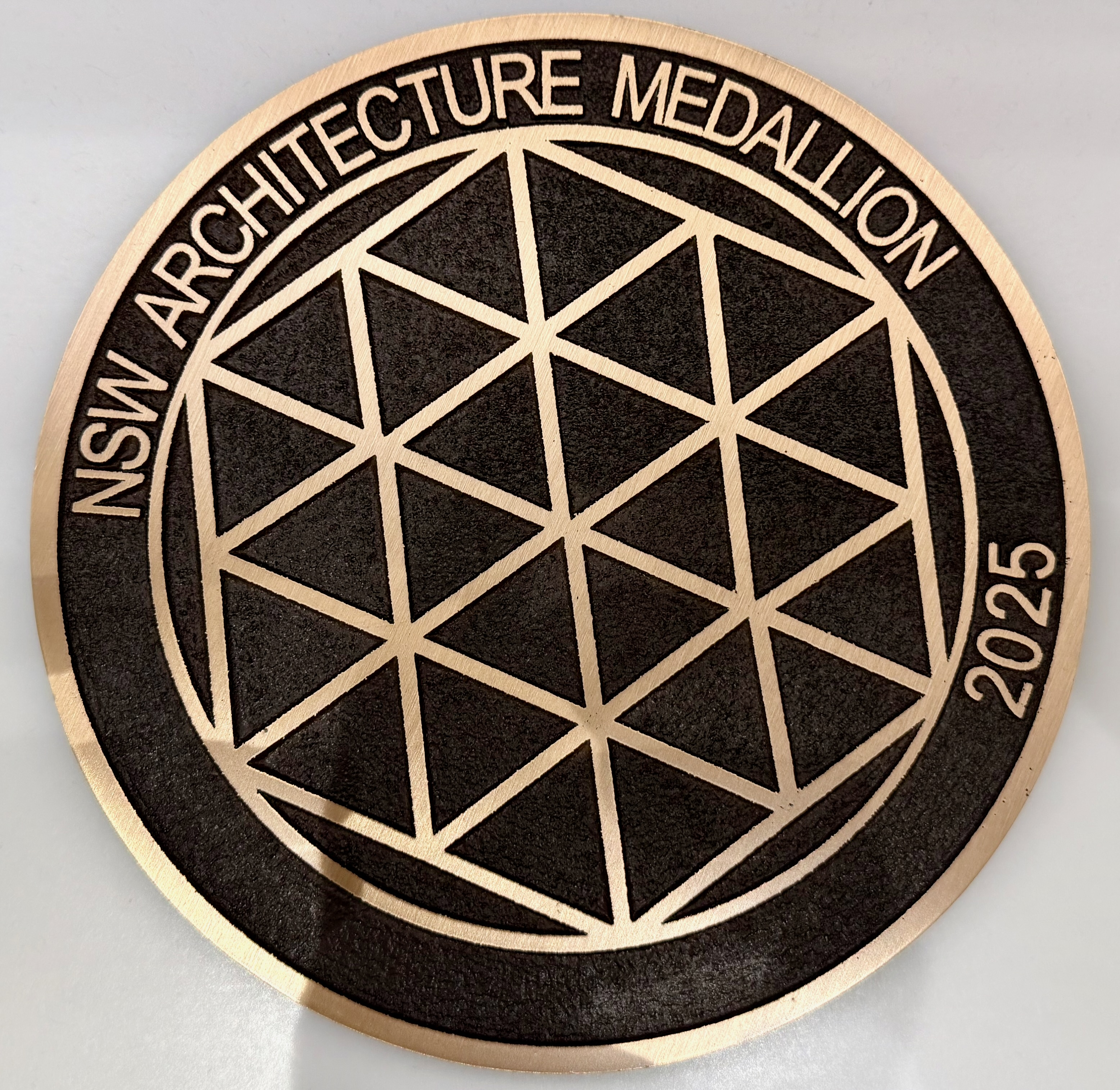
- Awarded for: Highest achievement in architecture, New South Wales
- Country: Australia
- Presented by: Australian Institute of Architects (NSW Chapter)
- First award: 2018; 8 years ago
- Currently held by: Woods Bagot in collaboration with John McAslan and Partners for Central Station, 2026
- Website: www.architecture.com.au/nsw-architecture-awards

The NSW Architecture Medallion is a state–based award presented annually by the New South Wales Chapter of the Australian Institute of Architects for a building project located in New South Wales considered to be the most exemplary of the year, realising innovation and excellence in the built environment. The award is selected by the Jury Chairs from the named awards winners at the annual NSW Chapter Awards. It is not be confused with the NSW Architects Medallion awarded by the NSW Architecture Registration Board since 1924 to an outstanding recent Masters of Architecture graduate from a New South Wales university.

== Background ==
The award was established in 2018, as part of a standardisation of state based Australian Institute of Architects awards. Prior to 2018 there was no award given in New South Wales for the overall most outstanding project for the year, with only named awards given for the best project in each category.

The NSW Architecture Medallion follows in the tradition of the Victorian Architecture Medal started in 1929, the Canberra Medallion started in 1956 and the Tracy Memorial Award started in 1976 in the Northern Territory. By 2021 all Australian states had a significant named award, medal or medallion that selects the most outstanding project from all categories and entries received in a particular year.

== Recipients by year ==
NSW Architecture Medallion Awards since 2018
Year	Architect	Project	Location	Type	Other AIA awards
2018	Peter Stutchbury Architecture in association with Design 5, architects for City of Sydney	Joynton Avenue Creative Precinct	Joynton Avenue, Rosebery	Cultural	Greenway Award for Heritage, 2019 (NSW); Public Architecture Award, 2019 (NSW)
2019	CHROFI with McGregor Coxall	The Riverlink, Maitland	396 High Street, Maitland	Cultural	National Award for Public Architecture, 2019; Sulman Medal, 2019 (NSW); Blacket Prize, 2019 (NSW)
2020	Durbach Block Jaggers and John Wardle Architects	Phoenix Central Park	37–49 O'Connor Street, Chippendale	Cultural	Harry Seidler Award for Commercial Architecture, 2020; Sir Arthur G. Stephenson Award for Commercial Architecture, 2020 (NSW); John Verge Award for Interior Architecture, 2020 (NSW)
2021	Cox Architecture with Neeson Murcutt and Neille	Australian Museum Project Discover	College Street, Sydney	Cultural	National Award for Public Architecture, 2021; Greenway Award for Heritage, 2021 (NSW); John Verge Award for Interior Architecture, 2021 (NSW)
2022	Tonkin Zulaikha Greer	Walsh Bay Arts Precinct	Hickson Road, Walsh Bay	Cultural	Award for Public Architecture, 2022 (NSW); Greenway Award for Heritage, 2022 (NSW)
2023	Ashton Raggatt McDougall (ARM)	Sydney Opera House Concert Hall Renewal	Bennelong Point, Sydney	Cultural	Lachlan Macquarie Award for Heritage Architecture, 2023; Emil Sodersten Award for Interior Architecture, 2023; John Verge Award for Interior Architecture, 2023 (NSW); Greenway Award for Heritage, 2023 (NSW)
2024	CHROFI and Bangawarra with National Parks and Wildlife Service	Burragula Lookout (North Head Viewing Platforms)	North Head Scenic Drive, North Head, Sydney	Cultural	Nicholas Murcutt Award for Small Project Architecture, 2024; Robert Woodward Award for Small Project Architecture, 2024 (NSW)
2025	Sydney Metro	Sydney Metro City: City Line Stations (Sydenham, Waterloo, Central, Gadigal, Martin Place, Barangaroo, Victoria Cross, Crows Nest)	Sydney CBD	Transport	Lloyd Rees Award for Urban Design, 2025 (NSW); Walter Burley Griffin Award for Urban Design, 2025
2026	Woods Bagot in collaboration with John McAslan and Partners	Central Station Redevelopment (2018—2024)	Eddy Avenue, Sydney, New South Wales	Transport	Sir John Sulman Medal, 2026 (NSW); National Award for Public Architecture, 2026

== Gallery ==
NSW Architecture Medallion awarded projects
2018 Award, Joynton Avenue Creative Precinct

2019 Award, The Riverlink, Maitland

2020 Award, Phoenix Central Park

2021 Award, Australian Museum Project Discover

2022 Award, Walsh Bay Arts Precinct

2023 Award, Sydney Opera House Concert Hall Renewal

2024 Award, Burragula Lookout, North Head

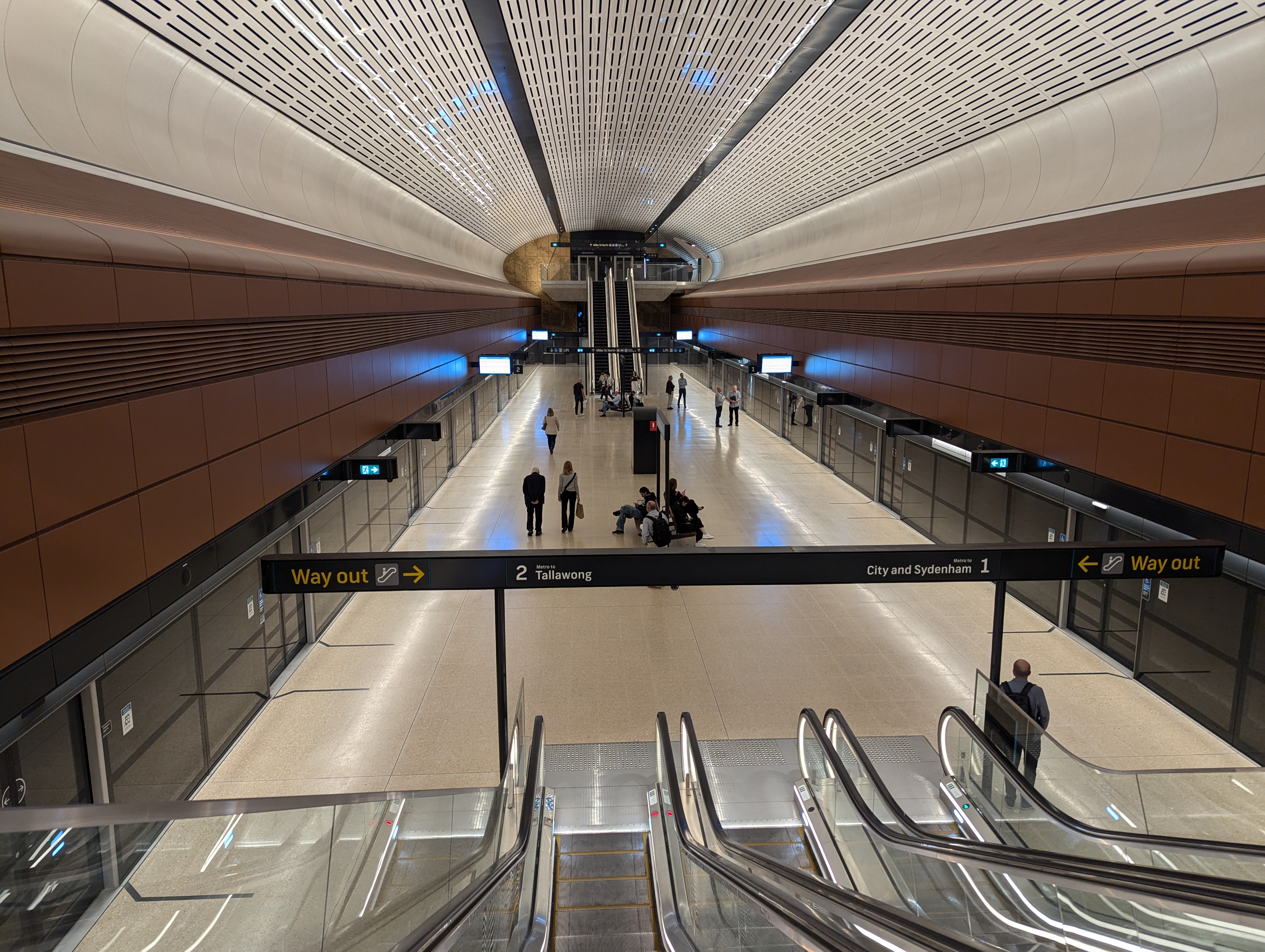
2025 Award, Sydney Metro, Crows Nest to Sydenham Stations

2026 Award, Central Station Redevelopment (2018—2024)

== See also ==
- Victorian Architecture Medal
- Canberra Medallion
