= Punchbowl Mosque =

Mosque in Sydney, Australia

- Location in greater metropolitan Sydney

Religion
- Affiliation: Islam
- Ecclesiastical or organizational status: Mosque
- Ownership: Australian Islamic Mission
- Status: Active

Location
- Location: Matthews Street, Punchbowl, Sydney, New South Wales
- Country: Australia
- Interactive map of Punchbowl Mosque
- Coordinates: 33.92718°S 151.05740°E

Architecture
- Architect: Angelo Candalepas
- Type: Mosque
- Groundbreaking: 2015
- Completed: 2019
- Construction cost: A$12 million
- Domes: 1 main dome; 102 mini domes

Design and construction
- Awards: Sir John Sulman Medal (2018)

Punchbowl Mosque is a mosque located in the Sydney suburb of Punchbowl, in the state of New South Wales, Australia designed by Greek-Australian architect Angelo Candalepas.

The building features a large central dome and 102 smaller concrete domes decorated with Islamic calligraphy depicting the 99 names of Allah. The mosque's use of exposed concrete has been likened to Brutalism, although some have pushed back against the distinction.

The project originally began in 1996 when the Muslim community purchased three neighbouring properties to replace a rented space. Gaining approval for the project took a total 17 years; the process was delayed significantly by objection from local government officials. Construction on the building was further delayed due to the discovery of a water table, continued objection from the Canterbury council, and difficulty gaining visas for calligraphers scheduled to decorate the building.

The building received the 2018 Sir John Sulman Medal.

== See also ==
- List of mosques in New South Wales
