= Sir John Sulman Medal =

Highest architecture award for public buildings in New South Wales

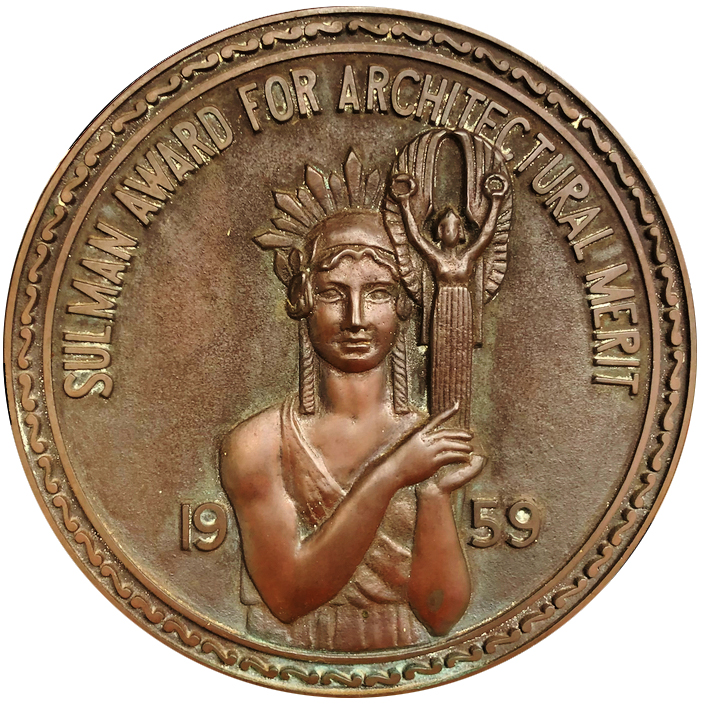
- 1959 Sulman Medal; Australian Academy of Science
- Awarded for: Public Architecture in New South Wales
- Country: Australia
- Presented by: Australian Institute of Architects (NSW Chapter)
- First award: 1934; 92 years ago
- Currently held by: Woods Bagot in collaboration with John McAslan and Partners, 2026
- Website: NSW Awards for Public Architecture

The Sir John Sulman Medal for Public Architecture is an architectural award presented by the New South Wales chapter of the Australian Institute of Architects since 1934. The medal is at times referred to as the Sulman Award and recognises excellence in public architecture in New South Wales.

Until 1961 the award also included projects in the Australian Capital Territory. The establishment of the ACT Chapter of the Institute of Architects in 1962 and a separate awards program including the Canberra Medallion changed the award to projects in New South Wales only. Before the advent of the NSW Chapter Wilkinson Award in 1961, the Sulman was also awarded to residential housing projects.

== Background ==
=== Sir John Sulman ===
The medal is presented in memory of the Australian architect Sir John Sulman (29 August 1849–18 August 1934). Sulman was born in Greenwich, England, and emigrated to Sydney in 1885. From 1921 to 1924 he was chairman of the Federal Capital Advisory Committee and influenced the development of Canberra. Late in his life, Sulman personally established a fund to be administered by the Institute of Architects, to support the annual awarding of the Sulman Medal for the design of a building demonstrating exceptional architectural merit. The first award was presented in June 1934 shortly before Sulman's death.

=== Medal and plaque design ===
The medal design was completed in 1934 by Rayner Hoff (1894—1937), sculptor and teacher, well known for his architectural scaled sculptures in Sydney's Anzac Memorial in Hyde Park. Along with a small presentation medal, a circular bronze plaque has the text 'Sulman Award for Architectural Merit' on its perimeter, the year awarded, and a female figure holding a smaller winged female figure. The central figure is a stylised classical female in draped garments wearing a radiated headdress, reminiscent of classical depictions of deities or personifications such as Justice, Athena, or Liberty, symbolising cultural enlightenment, reason, and civic virtue. Her left arm cradles a sculptural figure, and her right hand gestures toward it, indicating reverence or presentation. The object she holds is a trophy or miniature statue, depicting a smaller winged or robed figure standing with arms raised. This smaller figure resembles traditional representations of Victory (Nike) or a muse, which often symbolise achievement, excellence, and inspiration.

The reverse side of the medal is inscribed with the text 'Awarded for the design of a building of exceptional merit', with a wreath and ribbon design at the top of the medal and the designer's mark of Hoff at the bottom.

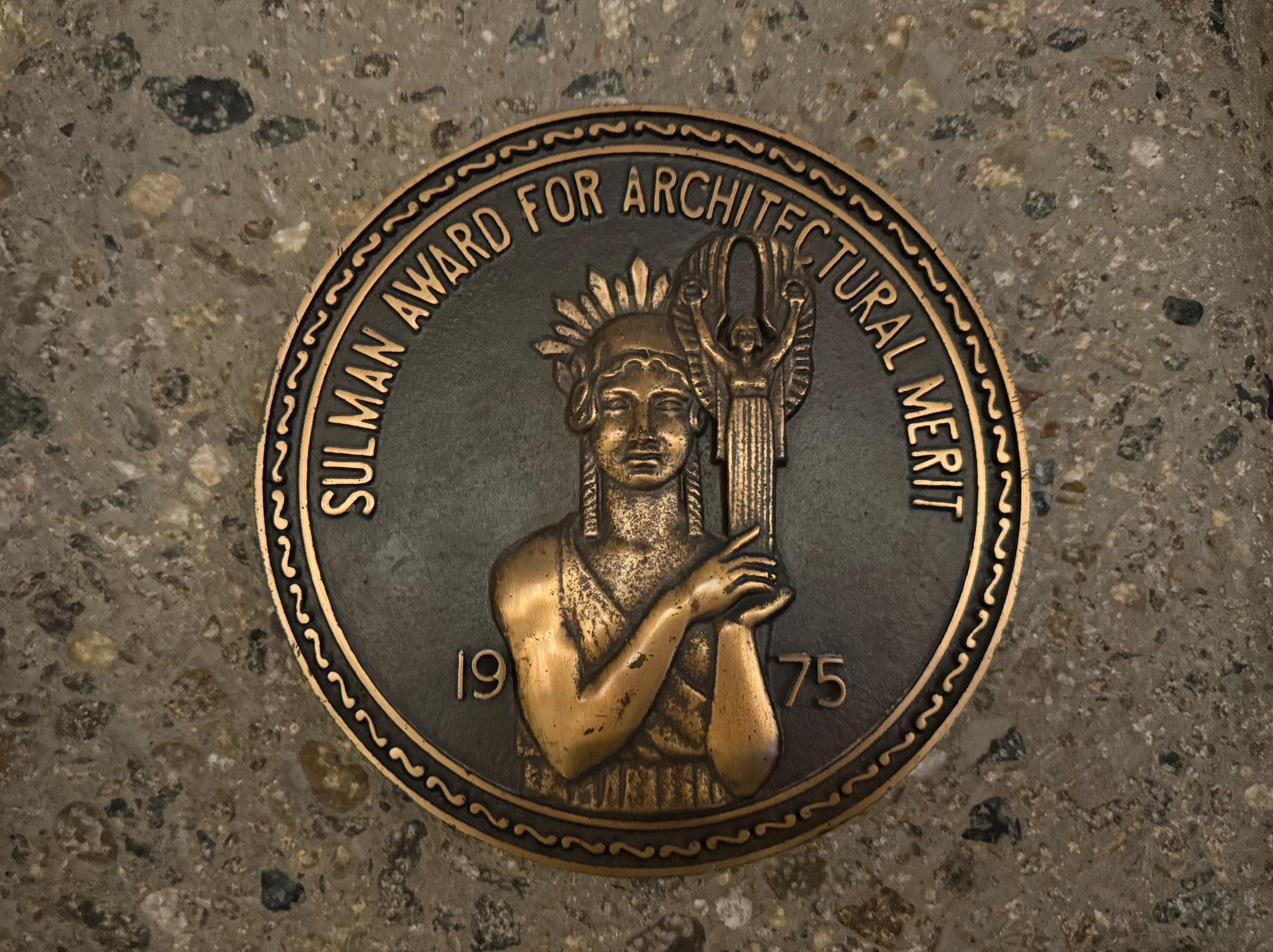
Sulman Medal 1975, at the Art Gallery of NSW, Captain Cook Wing

== History of the Award ==
=== Establishment ===
In September 1934, less than three weeks after Sulman's death, a description of the intentions of the award were reported in an article in The Sydney Morning Herald. "The late Sir John Sulman with a view to encouraging excellence of design in street architecture presented to the Institute of Architects a fund to provide a medal to be awarded for the design of a building of exceptional merit. The architect of the selected building will receive a medal and a diploma."

The conditions governing the first award were as follows: "(1) The building must front a street, road, square, or court to which the public has access; (2) the architect whose building is submitted must himself be its designer and must satisfy the jury in this regard; (3) any member of the I.A.N.S.W. shall be at liberty to nominate any building for consideration by the jury he is also at liberty to nominate a building of his own design; (4) the jury does not bind itself to confine itself to the buildings nominated should a nominated building have been designed by a member of the jury he shall retire during its consideration; (5) the jury shall comprise four architects, one painter, one art critic and the director of The National Art Gallery, to be elected annually by the council of the Institute."

"The Institute has decided to examine annually the buildings in one of six specified classes completed within the previous five years. The classes are:—(1) public (including recreational or sporting, theatres, transport, governmental); (2) ecclesiastical; (3) educational (including art galleries, museums etc.); (4) commercial; (5) domestic; (6) institutional. The council has decided to accept nominations for the 1934 medal for a domestic building."

John Sulman was enthusiastic about town planning, and it was intended that the Medal was for "a building of exceptional merit that contributed to the streetscape". This interest in the greater urban environment and the relationship of the building to the public domain parallels the earlier Royal Institute of British Architects Street Architecture Medal instigated in 1923, and the RVIA Street Architecture Medal in Melbourne that began in 1929, later to be known as the Victorian Architecture Medal.

=== 1938 Award ===
The 1938 Award to the City Architect F.A. Scorer for the Newcastle Incinerator was the first to be awarded for a regional project. Responding to the design of the building the jury report stated “The Jury is of the opinion that the City of Newcastle, and the State of New South Wales generally, is fortunate in having such an excellent contribution to its architecture. The design is felt to be extremely good in its massing, and well expresses the internal functions of the building. The honesty and simplicity of the design conduces largely to its success. The careful and skilful handling of the detail shows a high degree of refinement. The planning, except for one or two minor points, is of the same standard as the elevational treatment."

=== 1941 Award ===
In April 1941 the Council of the New South Wales Chapter of the Royal Australian Institute of Architects invited nominations of buildings for the 1940 Sir John Sulman Medal. The appointed jury was M.E. Herman, ARAIA (Architect), G.H.B. McDonnell, ARAIA (Architect and 1940 winner), John D. Moore, ARAIA (Architect and 1937 winner), Henry Pynor, ARAIA (Architect), Frank Medworth, RBA (Painter), R. Haughton James (Art Critic) and Will Ashton (Director, National Art Gallery). Nominated buildings needed to have been completed during the five years ending 31 December 1940. Categories for consideration included: 1. Public and Monumental — Government Buildings, Town Halls, Art Galleries, Railway Stations, Hospitals, etc. 2. Educational and Ecclesiastical — Schools, Churches, Convents, etc. 3. Commercial and Industrial — Office Buildings, Warehouses, Factories, etc. 4. Recreational— Theatres, Sporting Buildings, etc. 5. Domestic and Residential — Homes, Flat Buildings, etc.

=== 1950 Award ===
In the 1950 Year Book of the Royal Australian Institute of Architects, the Sir John Sulman Medal and Diploma was defined as being "awarded annually for a building of exceptional merit in one of the following classes: (1) Public and Monumental, (2) Educational and Ecclesiastical, (3) Commercial and Industrial, (4) Recreational, (5) Domestic and Residential. The building must have been erected in New South Wales within the previous five years and must be readily accessible and visible. The Jury comprises four Architects, one Painter, one Art Critic, and the Director of the National Art Gallery."

== List of Sulman Medal winners ==
Year	Architect	Project	Category	Location	Other awards and notes
1932	Peddle Thorp & Walker	Science House	Public	157–169 Gloucester Street and Essex Street, The Rocks	(Awarded June 1934)
1933	Budden & Mackey	Primary Producers' Bank	Commercial and Industrial	105 Pitt Street, Sydney	(demolished 1964)
1934	Professor Leslie Wilkinson	No.6 Wiston Gardens	Domestic	4–6 Wiston Gardens, Double Bay	
1935	Fowell & McConnel	St. Anne's Roman Catholic Shrine	Ecclesiastical	60 Blair Street, North Bondi	(Awarded June 1936)
1936	Budden & Mackey	Transport House also known as Railway House	Public	19—31 York Street, Sydney	RIBA Medal, 1939
1937	John D. Moore & V.L. Dowling	West Wing, Frensham School	Education	Mittagong	(Awarded May 1939)
1938	F.A. Scorer (Chief Architect, Greater Newcastle City Council)	Newcastle Municipal Incinerator	Commercial and Industrial	Parry Street and Ravenshaw Street, Newcastle	(Awarded November 1939, demolished 1989)
1939	Eric W. Andrew	Manly Surf Pavilion	Public	Manly Beach, South Steyne and Ashburner Street, Manly	(demolished 1980)
1940	Gerard Henry Bussell McDonell	McDonell House (architect's own)	Domestic	67 Elgin Street, Gordon	
1941	Stephenson & Turner	King George V Memorial Hospital for Mothers and Babies	Institutional	Missenden Road, Camperdown	
1942	Professor Leslie Wilkinson	St. Michael's Church Complex Additions	Ecclesiastical	Corner Gilliver Avenue & Vaucluse Road, Vaucluse	
1943	Fowell, McConnel & Mansfield in association with Brian O'Rorke (London)	Orient Line Building	Commercial and Industrial	2–6 Spring Street, Sydney	(Building significantly altered, although facade retained and then demolished 2006)
1944	No Award^{†}				
1945	Sydney Ancher	Ancher House (Poyntzfield)	Domestic	3 Maytone Avenue, Killara	
1946	Stephenson & Turner	Concord Repatriation General Hospital (Yaralla Military Hospital)	Institutional	Hospital Road, Concord	
1947	Stafford, Moor & Farrington	Wormald Brothers building	Commercial and Industrial	210–222 Young Street, Waterloo	(demolished)
1948	Albert A. Hanson	Albert A. Hanson House	Domestic	55 Illeroy Avenue, Killara	
1949	No Award^{†}				
1950	Spencer, Spencer & Bloomfield	Top Dog Men's Wear Production Centre (now Officeworks)	Commercial and Industrial	800 Pittwater Road (intersection with Warringah, Harbord Roads) Dee Why	(substantially altered)
1951	Harry Seidler	Rose Seidler House	Domestic	71 Clissold Road, Wahroonga historically referred to as North Turramurra	
1952	Peddle Thorp and Walker and E.H.G. Lundquist (Sweden)	Royal Swedish Legation	Public	5 Turrana Street, Yarralumla, Canberra	
1953	Professor Brian Lewis	University House	Institutional	Australian National University, Canberra	
1954	Stafford Moor & Farrington	Boots Pure Drug Company	Commercial and Institutional	376 Eastern Valley Way, Roseville	(Demolished)
1955	Canberra Branch Commonwealth Department of Works (Architect Ian Slater)	Canberra Olympic Pool	Public	36 Constitution Avenue, Canberra	
1956	Baldwinson, Booth & Peters	Hotel Belmont	Public	483 Pacific Highway and Hitchcock Avenue Belmont	(Significantly altered
1957	John Allen & Russell Jack	Jack House	Domestic	62 Boundary Road, Wahroonga	
1958	Architect's Branch Sydney City Council	Florence Bartley Library	Institutional (last award by category rotation)	Fitzroy Gardens, Potts Point	(Demolished 1995)
1959	Grounds, Romberg & Boyd	Australian Academy of Science (The Shine Dome)	Institution	15 Gordon Street, Acton, Canberra	Meritorious Architecture Award, ACT, 1959; Canberra Medallion, 1961; Sir Roy Grounds Award for Enduring Architecture, 2001
1960	Ancher Mortlock Murray & Woolley (Bryce Mortlock)	Badham House	Residential	95 Dolans Road South, Burraneer	
1961	Bunning & Madden	Liner House	Commercial	13–15 Bridge Street, Sydney	
1962	NSW Government Architect and Tom Mahony (Ted Farmer with Project Architect: Ken Woolley)	Fisher Library (Stage 1, Fisher North)	Education	University of Sydney	
1963	Ian McKay & Philip Cox	St Andrews Presbyterian Agricultural College Boys Home	Education	1050 Camden Valley Way, Leppington	(Closed 1980s, demolished 2015)
1964	NSW Government Architect (Ted Farmer and Project Architect: Peter Hall)	Goldstein Hall	Education	Fig Tree Lane, Kensington Campus, University of New South Wales	Journal of Architecture & Arts Award, 1964
1964	Hely Bell & Horne	St Johns Village (now Anglicare St Johns Village)	Residential	75 St Johns Road & Glebe Point Road, Glebe	
1965	Ian McKay & Philip Cox	C.B. Alexander Presbyterian Agricultural College (Tocal College)	Education	Tocal, Paterson	Blacket Award, 1965 (NSW); National Award for Enduring Architecture, 2014; New South Wales Enduring Architecture Award, 2014
1966	Edwards, Madigan, Torzillo & Partners	Warringah Shire Library (now Dee Why Library)	Public	725 Pittwater Road, Dee Why	
1967	Harry Seidler & Associates	Australia Square	Commercial	George Street, Sydney	Civic Design Award for a work of outstanding environmental design, 1967; National Award for Enduring Architecture, 2012; New South Wales Enduring Architecture Award, 2012
1968	No Award^{†}				
1969	NSW Government Architect (Ted Farmer)	Marsden Retarded Children's Centre	Institutional	Mons Road, Westmead, historically referred as Parramatta	(partially demolished)
1970	Edwards, Madigan, Torzillo & Briggs in conjunction with NSW Government Architect (Ted Farmer)	Student Residence 'A'	Education	Mitchell College of Advanced Education, Bathurst	
1971	No Award^{†}				
1972	No Award^{†}				
1973	No Award^{†}				
1974	No Award^{†}				
1975	NSW Government Architect (Ted Farmer with Project Architect: Andrew Andersons)	Extension to the Art Gallery of New South Wales, (Captain Cook Wing) 1972	Public	Art Gallery Road, Sydney	New South Wales Enduring Architecture Award, 2007; City of Sydney Architectural Award, 1973
1976	No Award^{†}				
1977	No Award^{†}				
1978	NSW Government Architect (Ian Thomson with Project Architect: David Turner)	Kuring-gai College of Advanced Education	Education	Eaton Road, Lindfield	New South Wales Enduring Architecture Award, 2005
1979	No Award^{†}				
1981	NSW Government Architect (Ian Thomson with Project Architect: Chris Johnson)	Hampden Park Primary School	Education	35 Hampden Road, Lakemba	
1981	Harry Seidler & Associates	Glen Street Offices	Commercial	2 Glen Street, Milsons Point	New South Wales Enduring Architecture Award, 2010; RAIA Interior Design Award (Penthouse apartment), 1991; RAIA Award, 1991; RAIA Award, 1974
1982	No Award^{†}				
1983	Harry Seidler & Associates	MLC Centre	Commercial	25 Martin Place, Sydney	Lloyd Rees Civic Design Award, 1981
1983	John Andrews International	American Express Tower (King George Tower) now 388 George	Commercial	388 George Street, Sydney	
1984	NSW Government Architect (Ian Thomson with Project Architect: Lindsay Kelly) and Noel Bell Ridley Smith & Partners	Parklea Prison	Institutional	Sunnyholt Road, Parklea	
1985	NSW Government Architect (Ian Thomson) in association with Vivian Fraser	Wharf Theatre Pier 4	Cultural	Pier 4/5, Millers Point	National Award for Enduring Architecture, 2008; New South Wales Enduring Architecture Award, 2008; President's Award for Recycled Buildings, 1985 (National)
1985	Glenn Murcutt	Zachary's Restaurant	Commercial	1-3 Yulong Avenue (corner McCarrs Creek Road), Terrey Hills	(Substantially modified)
1986	NSW Government Architect (Ian Thomson and Project Architect: Colin Still)	City Council Library & Regional Gallery	Public	149 Byng Street, Orange	
1987	Rice Daubney in association with Stephenson & Turner	Queen Victoria Building restoration	Commercial	George Street, Sydney	
1988	NSW Government Architect (Ian Thomson with Project Architect: Lionel Glendenning, Assistant Government Architect, Special Projects Branch)	Powerhouse Museum	Cultural	500 Harris Street, Ultimo	President's Award for outstanding contribution to the architectural profession, 1988 (NSW); ACROD (Australian Council for Rehabilitation of Disabled) Award for barrier-free circulation, 1988; (partially demolished 2026)
1989	NSW Government Architect (Lindsay Kelly with Project Architect: Andrew Andersons)	Art Gallery of New South Wales Stage 2 Extensions	Cultural	Art Gallery Road, Sydney	
1989	Cox Richardson Taylor and Partners	Sydney Exhibition Centre	Public	Darling Harbour, Sydney	(Demolished 2014)
1990	Bligh Robinson Architects	Lake Crackenback Village	Residential	1650 Alpine Way, Crackenback	RAIA Finalist National Award, 1990
1991	Harry Seidler & Associates	Grosvenor Place	Commercial	225 George Street, Sydney	
1992	Jørn Utzon	Sydney Opera House (Commemorative Award)	Cultural	Bennelong Point, Sydney	RAIA Merit Award, 1974; RAIA Civic Design Award, 1980; New South Wales Enduring Architecture Award, 2003; National Award for Enduring Architecture, 2003
1993	No Award^{†}				
1994	Denton Corker Marshall	Governor Phillip Tower	Commercial	1 Farrer Place, Sydney	
1995	No Award^{†}				
1996	No Award^{†}				
1997	Grose Bradley Architects	Architecture Design Studio	Education	University Drive, Callaghan, University of Newcastle	Commendation, Sir Zelman Cowen Award for Public Architecture, 1997
1998	Hassell	Olympic Park Station	Transport	Sydney Olympic Park	Sir Zelman Cowen Award for Public Architecture, 1998; Access Citation Award, 1998; New South Wales Enduring Architecture Award, 2023
1999	Glenn Murcutt, Wendy Lewin, Reg Lark	Arthur and Yvonne Boyd Education Centre	Cultural	170 Riversdale Road, Illaroo NSW	Sir Zelman Cowen Award for Public Architecture, 1999
2000	MGT Architects	The Scientia	Education	University of New South Wales, Kensington	Sir Zelman Cowen Award for Public Architecture, 2000; Lloyd Rees Award for Civic Design, 2000
2000	Bligh Voller Nield	Sydney Olympic Park Tennis Centre (Ken Rosewall Arena)	Recreation	Corner Olympic Boulevard &, Shirley Strickland Avenue, Sydney Olympic Park	BHP Colorbond Award, 2000 (NSW)
2001	Suters Architects with Stutchbury & Pape	Life Sciences Building	Education	University of Newcastle	
2002	Hassell in association with Peter Armstrong	National Institute of Dramatic Art	Education	215 Anzac Parade, Kensington	
2003	Bligh Voller Nield and Woods Bagot	University of Technology Sydney, City Campus, Building 10	Education	Jones Street, Ultimo, Sydney	
2004	Renzo Piano Building Workshop in association with Lend Lease Design	Aurora Place	Commercial	88 Phillip Street, Sydney	
2005	Francis-Jones Morehen Thorp	The Mint, Historic Houses Trust of NSW	Cultural	10 Macquarie Street, Sydney	
2006	Bligh Voller Nield	36/37 Squadron Headquarters, Royal Australian Air Force	Defence	RAAF Base Richmond	
2007	No Award^{†}				
2008	Kennedy Associates	Bowden Centre, Australian Botanic Garden Mount Annan	Public	362 Narellan Road, Mount Annan	Sustainable Architecture Award, 2008
2009	Candalepas Associates	All Saints Grammar School (now All Saints Grammar)	Education	13–17 Cecilia Street, Belmore	National Award for Public Architecture, 2009
2010	Hassell	Epping to Chatswood Rail Link, Intermediate Stations	Transport	Macquarie Park; North Ryde	Sir Zelman Cowen Award for Public Architecture, 2010
2011	Bligh Voller Nield	Brain and Mind Research Institute, Youth Mental Health Building	Health	94 Mallett Street, Camperdown	World Architecture Festival, World Health Building, 2010; International Health Design Award, High Commendation, 2011; RIBA International Award for Architectural Excellence, 2011; National Award for Public Architecture, 2011; Chicago Athenaeum International Architecture Award, 2012
2012	BVN Architecture	Mabel Fidler Building, Ravenswood School for Girls	Education	10 Henry Street, Gordon	National Award for Public Architecture, 2012; Chicago Athenaeum International Architecture Award, 2013
2013	Collins and Turner Architects	Waterloo Youth, Family and Community Centre (now Weave Youth & Community Services)	Public	1B Elizabeth Street, Waterloo	National Award for Public Architecture, 2013
2014	Neeson Murcutt Architects in association with City of Sydney	Prince Alfred Park + Pool Upgrade	Recreation	Prince Alfred Park, Surry Hills	Lloyd Rees Award for Urban Design, 2014; City of Sydney Lord Mayor's Prize, 2014; National Award for Public Architecture, 2014
2015	BVN	Westmead Millennium Institute	Health	176 Hawkesbury Road, Westmead, New South Wales	
2016	Neeson Murcutt Architects	Kempsey Crescent Head Surf Life Saving Club	Recreation	Reserve Road, Crescent Head	Public Architecture National Commendation, 2016
2017	Crone Architects	Orange Regional Museum	Cultural	151 Byng Street, Orange	NSW Premier's Prize, 2017
2018	Candalepas Associates	Punchbowl Mosque	Religion	25–27 Matthews Street, Punchbowl	National Award for Public Architecture, 2018
2019	CHROFI	Maitland Riverlink	Public	396 High Street, Maitland	National Award for Public Architecture, 2019; NSW Architecture Medallion, 2019
2020	Johnson Pilton Walker with NSW Government Architect	Anzac Memorial Centenary Extension	War Memorial	Hyde Park, Sydney	Sir Zelman Cowen Award for Public Architecture, 2020
2021	Hassell Studio	Sydney Theatre Company	Cultural	Pier 4/5, Walsh Bay located at 15 Hickson Road, Dawes Point, Sydney	
2022	Kerstin Thompson Architects	Bundanon Art Museum and Bridge	Cultural	Bundanon, 533 Bundanon Road, Illaroo, NSW	Sir Zelman Cowen Award for Public Architecture, 2022; National Award for Sustainable Architecture, 2022; Architecture Award for Sustainable Architecture, 2022 (NSW)
2023	SANAA with Architectus (Executive Architects)	North Building (formerly Sydney Modern now Naala Nura), Art Gallery of New South Wales	Cultural	Art Gallery Road, Sydney	National Award for Public Architecture, 2023
2024	Grimshaw and Andrew Burges Architects with McGregor Coxall	Parramatta Aquatic Centre	Recreation	7A Park Parade, Parramatta	National Award for Public Architecture, 2024; Walter Burley Griffin Award for Urban Design, 2024
2025	BVN Architecture	Yarrila Place	Public	27 Gordon Street, Coffs Harbour	Sir Zelman Cowen Award for Public Architecture, 2025
2026	Woods Bagot in collaboration with John McAslan and Partners	Central Station (redevelopment 2018—2024)	Transport	Eddy Avenue, Sydney	NSW Architecture Medallion, 2026; National Award for Public Architecture, 2026

^{†}Each instance of 'No Award' was the decision of an appointed jury.

== Gallery ==
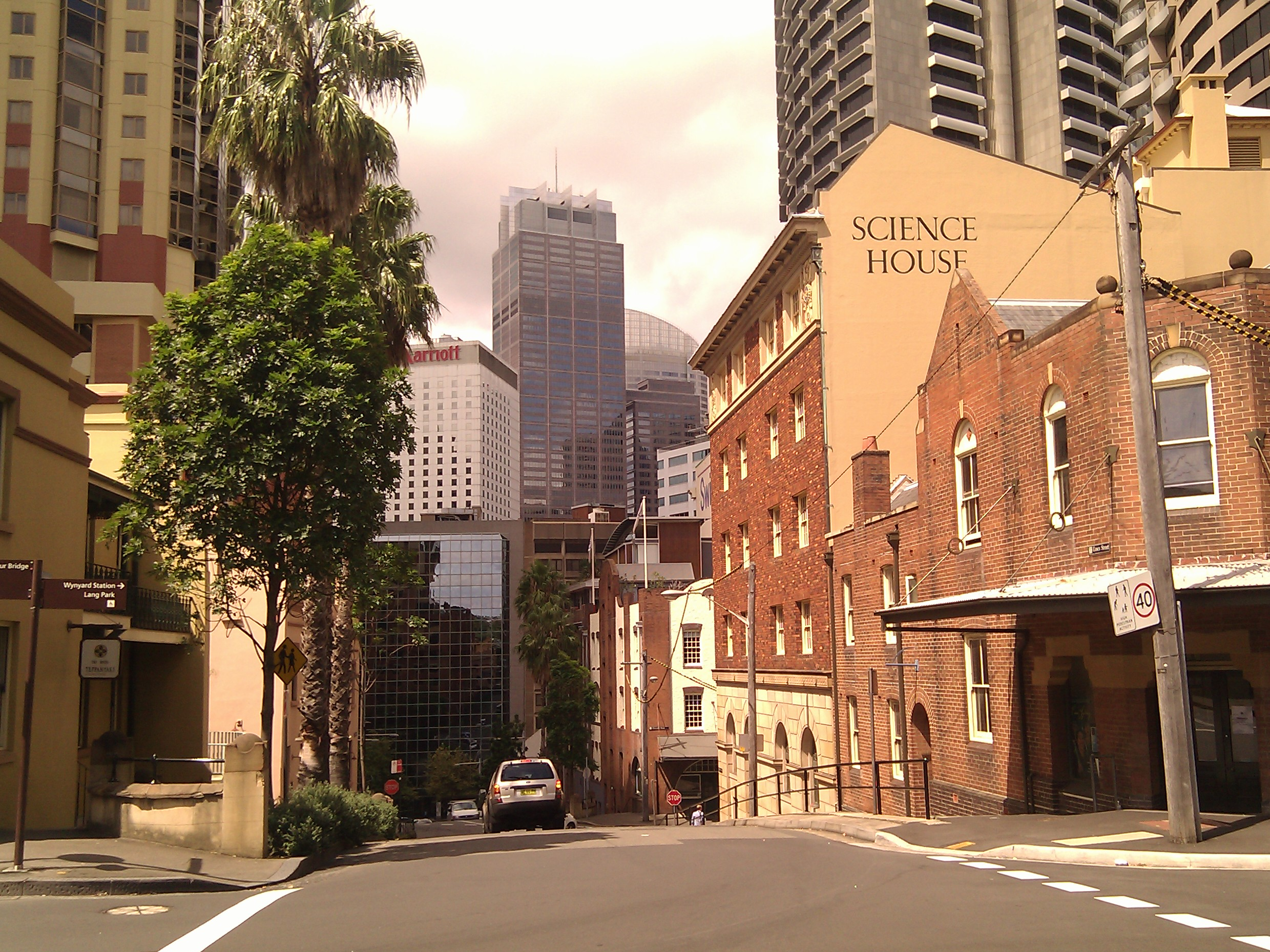
1932 Award, Science House

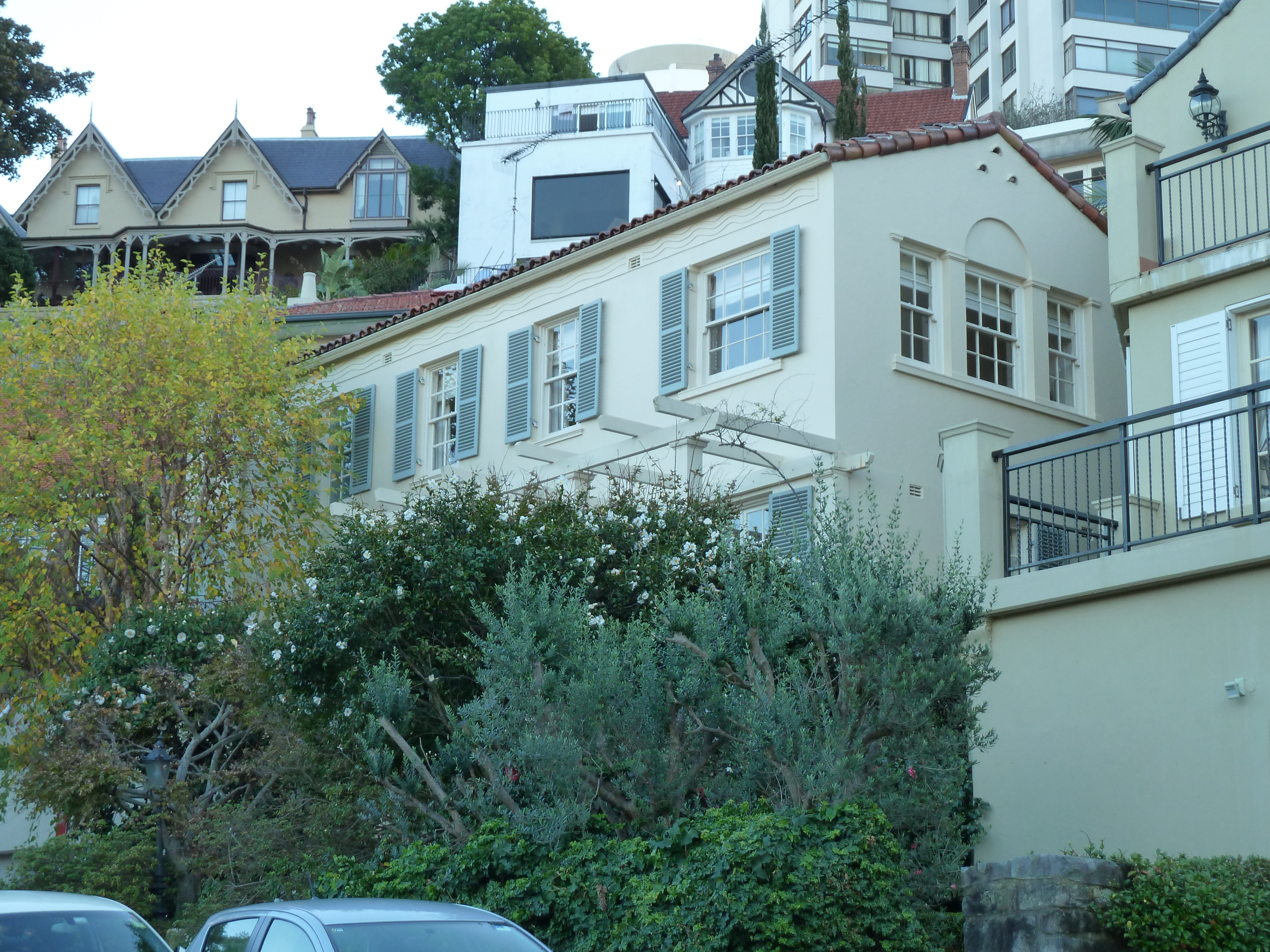
1934 Award, 6 Wiston Gardens, Double Bay

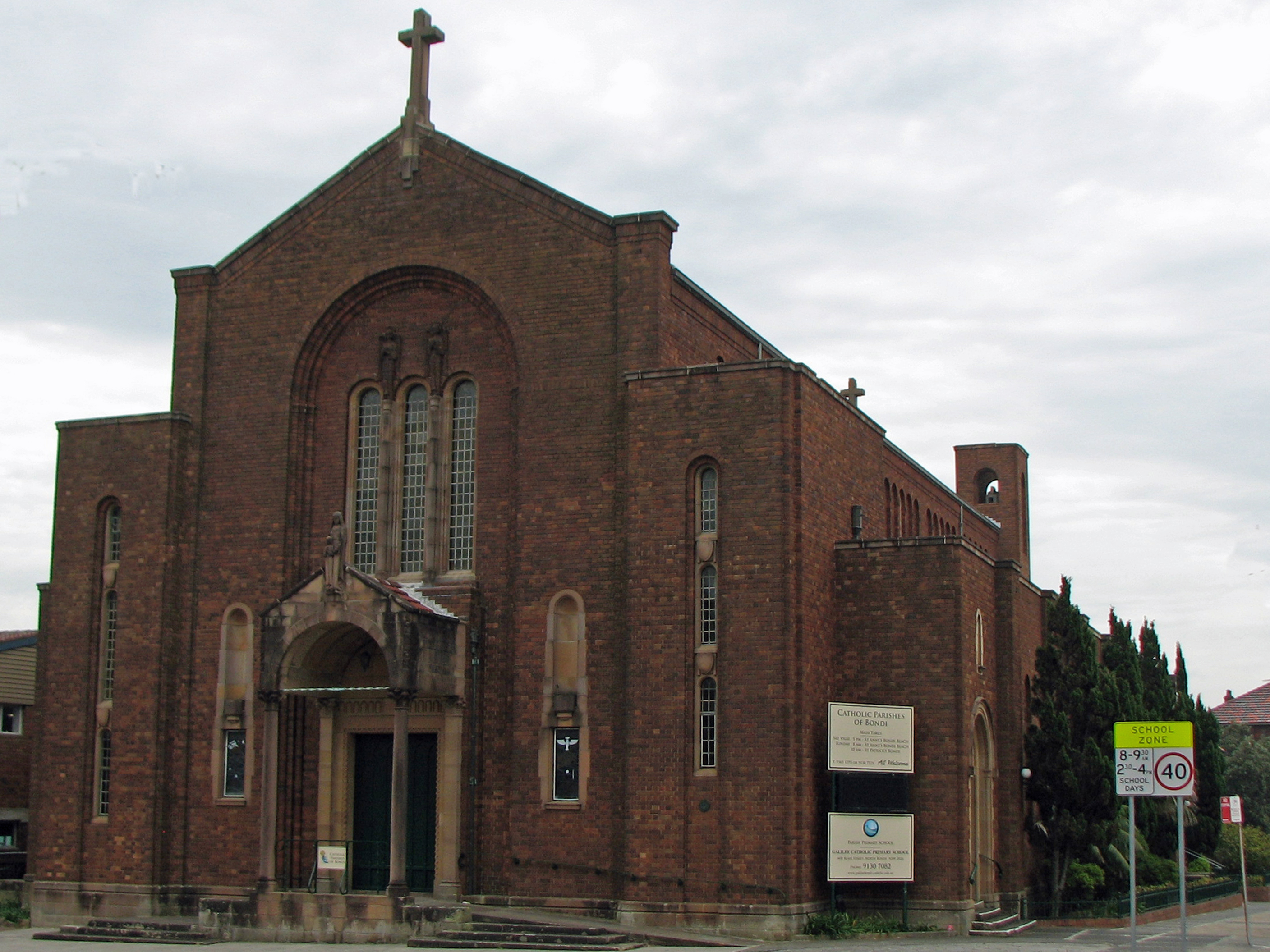
1935 Award, St Anne's Roman Catholic Shrine, North Bondi

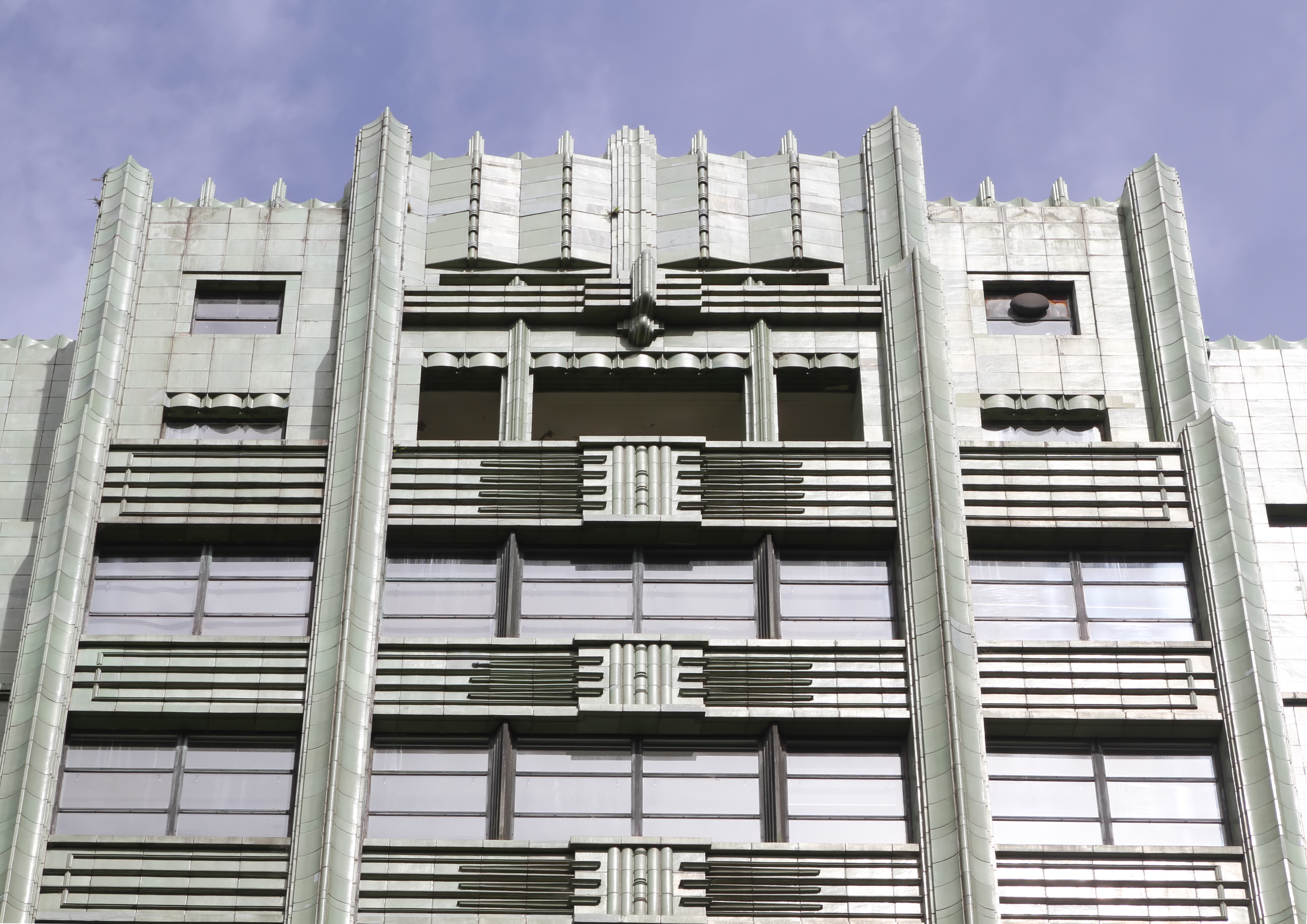
1936 Award, Railway House, York Street, Wynyard

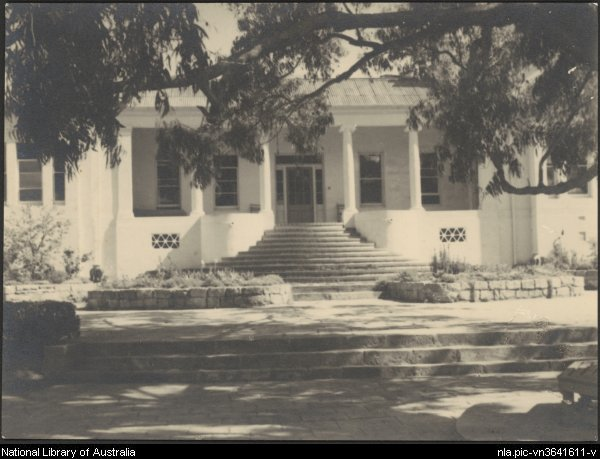
1937 Award, Frensham School West Wing, Mittagong

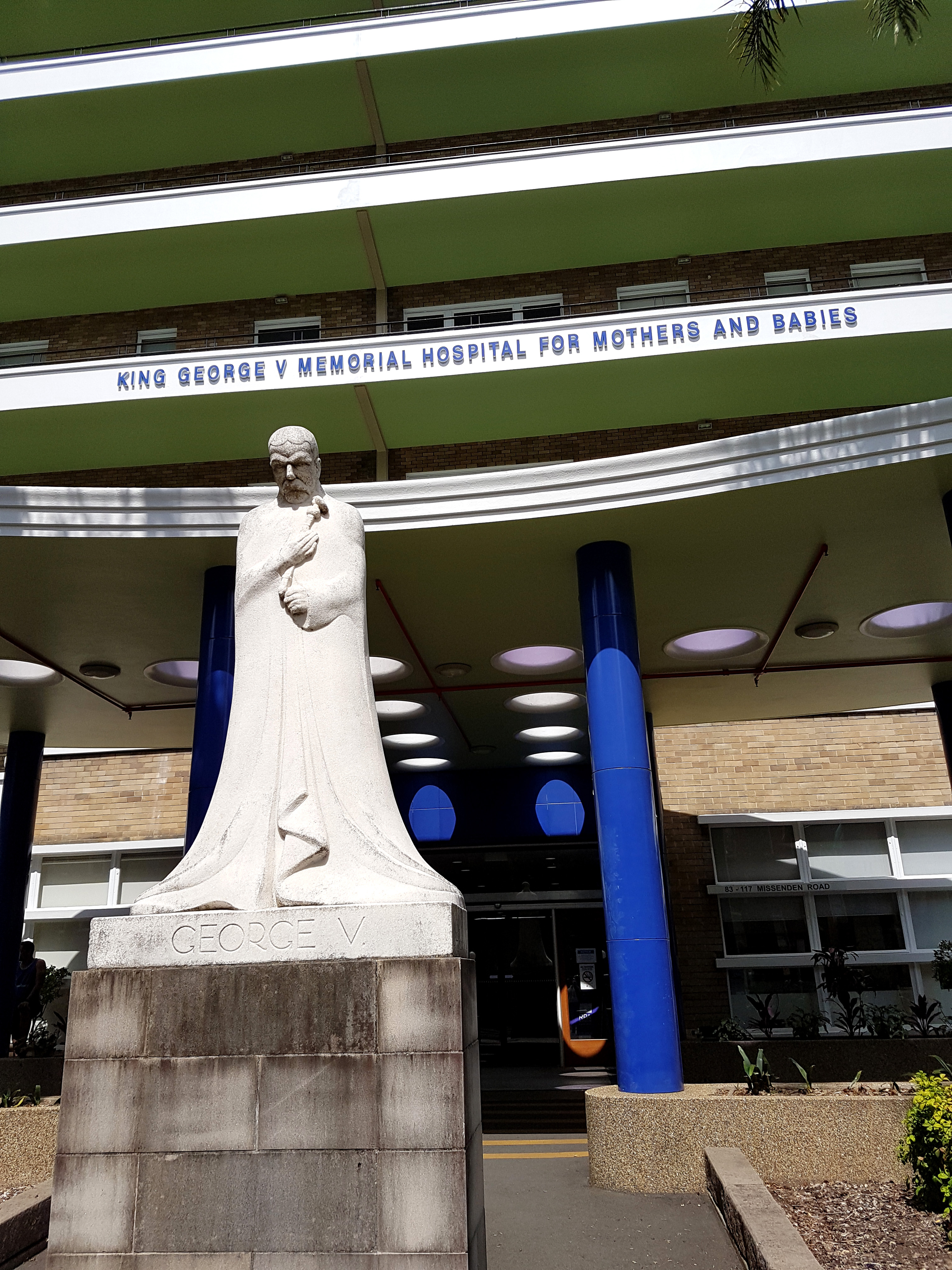
1941 Award, King George V Memorial Hospital for Mothers and Babies, Camperdown

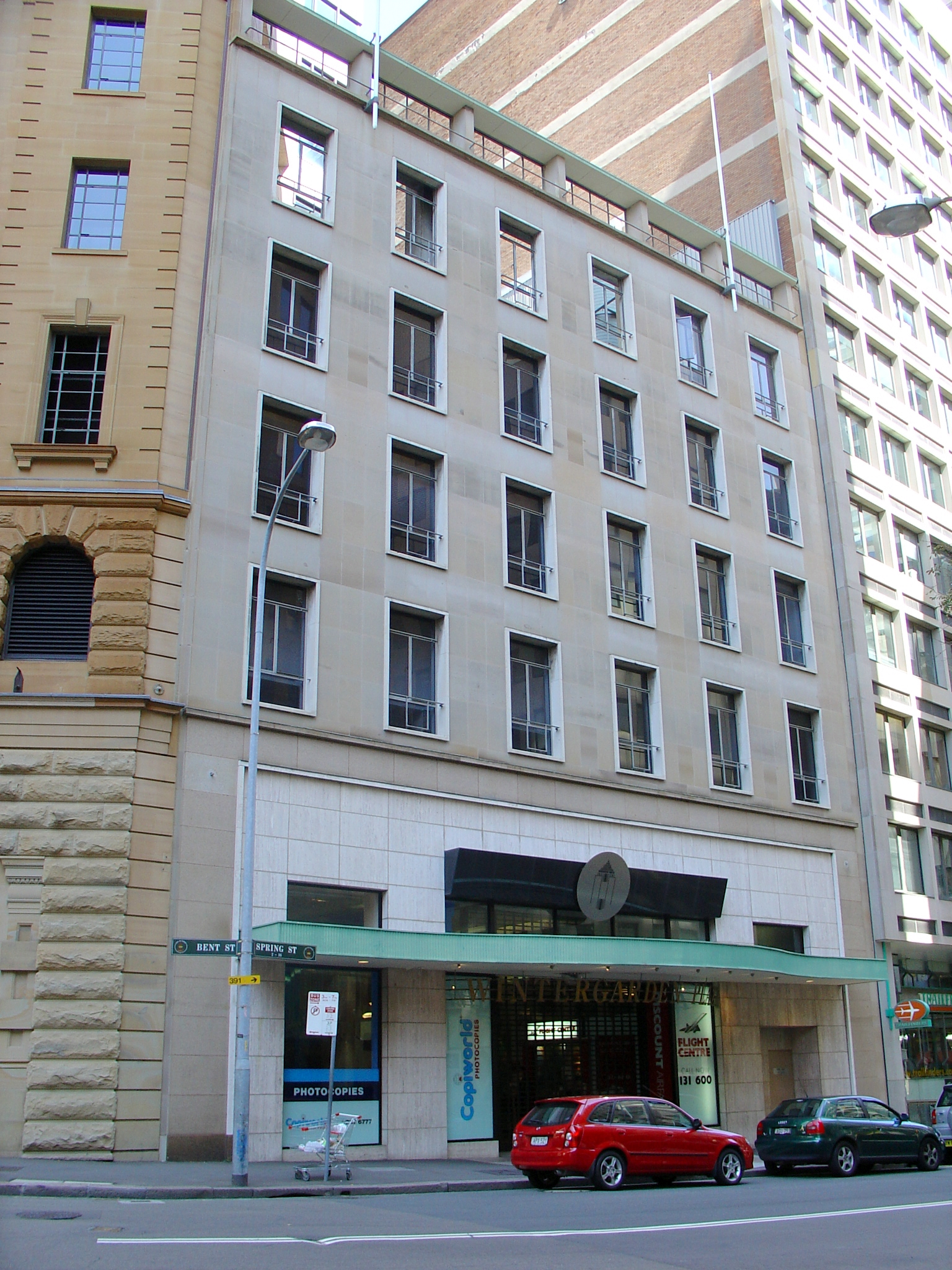
1943 Award, Orient Line Building, Sydney

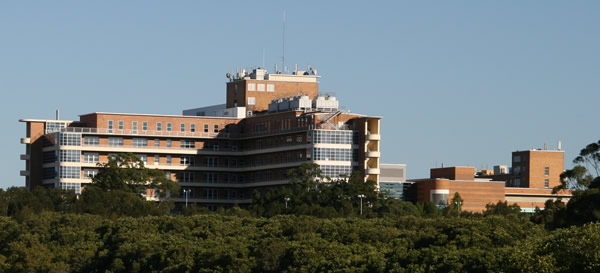
1946 Award, Concord Rehabilitation Hospital

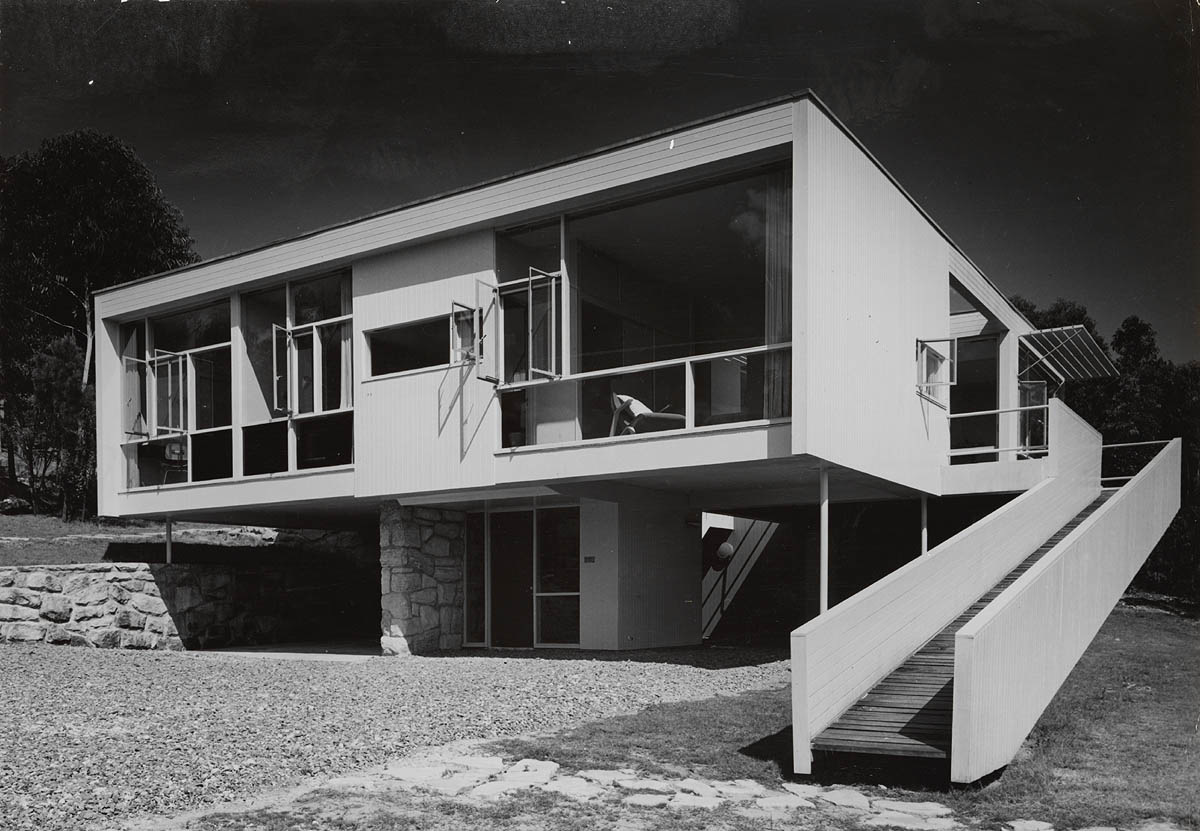
1951 Award, Rose Seidler House, Wahroonga

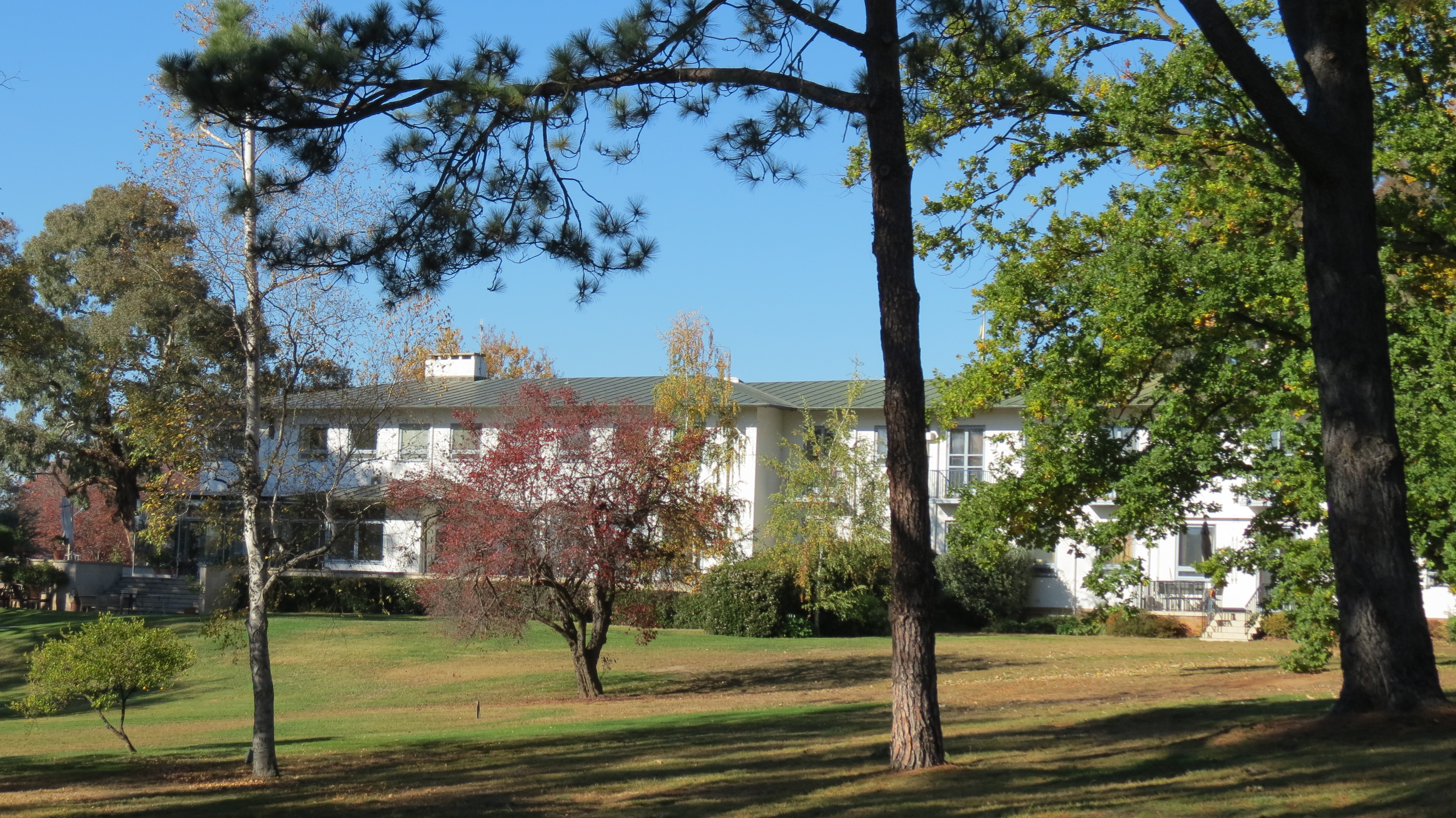
1952 Award, Royal Swedish Embassy Legation Building, Canberra

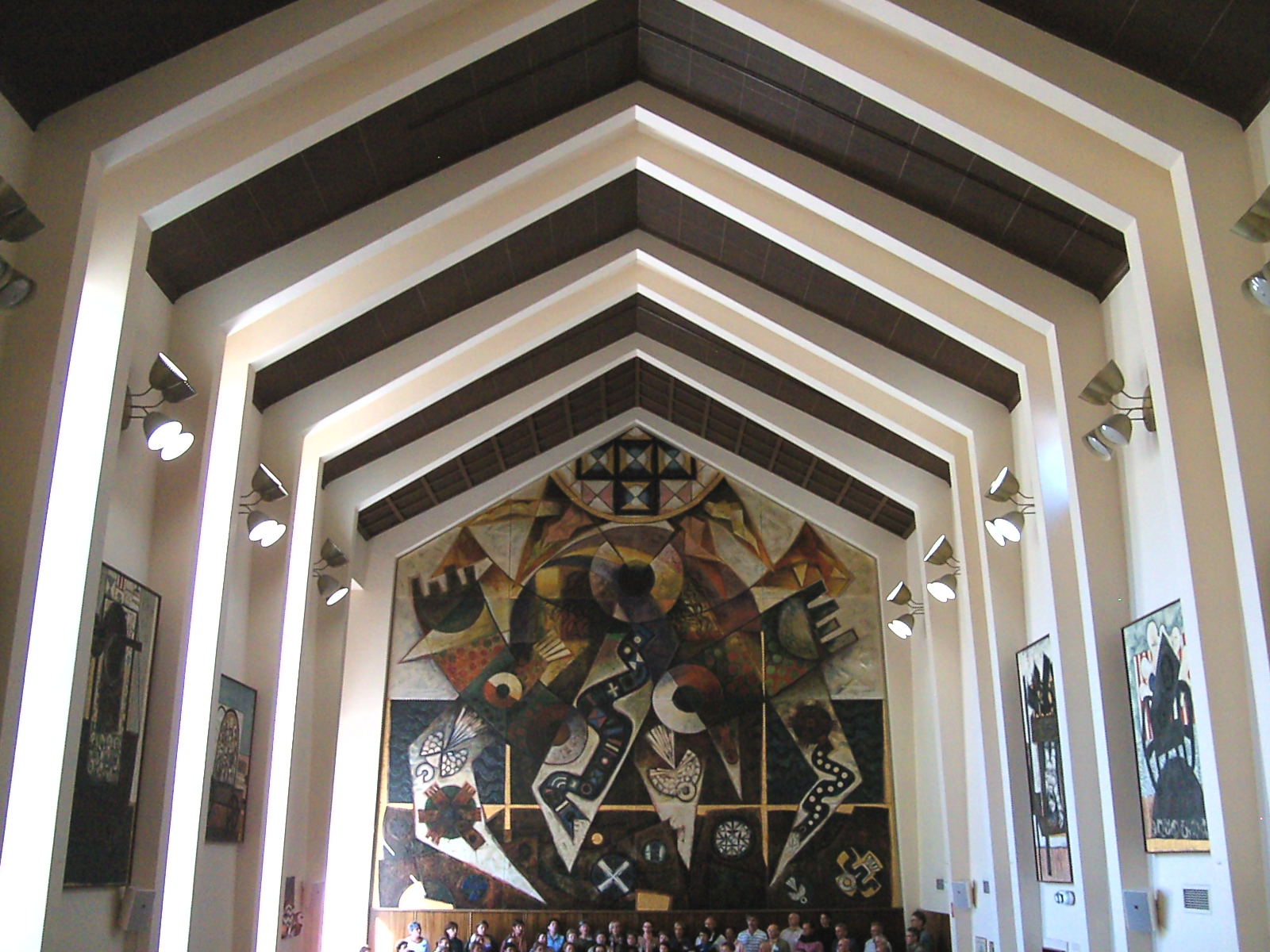
1953 Award, University House, ANU, Canberra

1955 Award, Canberra Olympic Pool

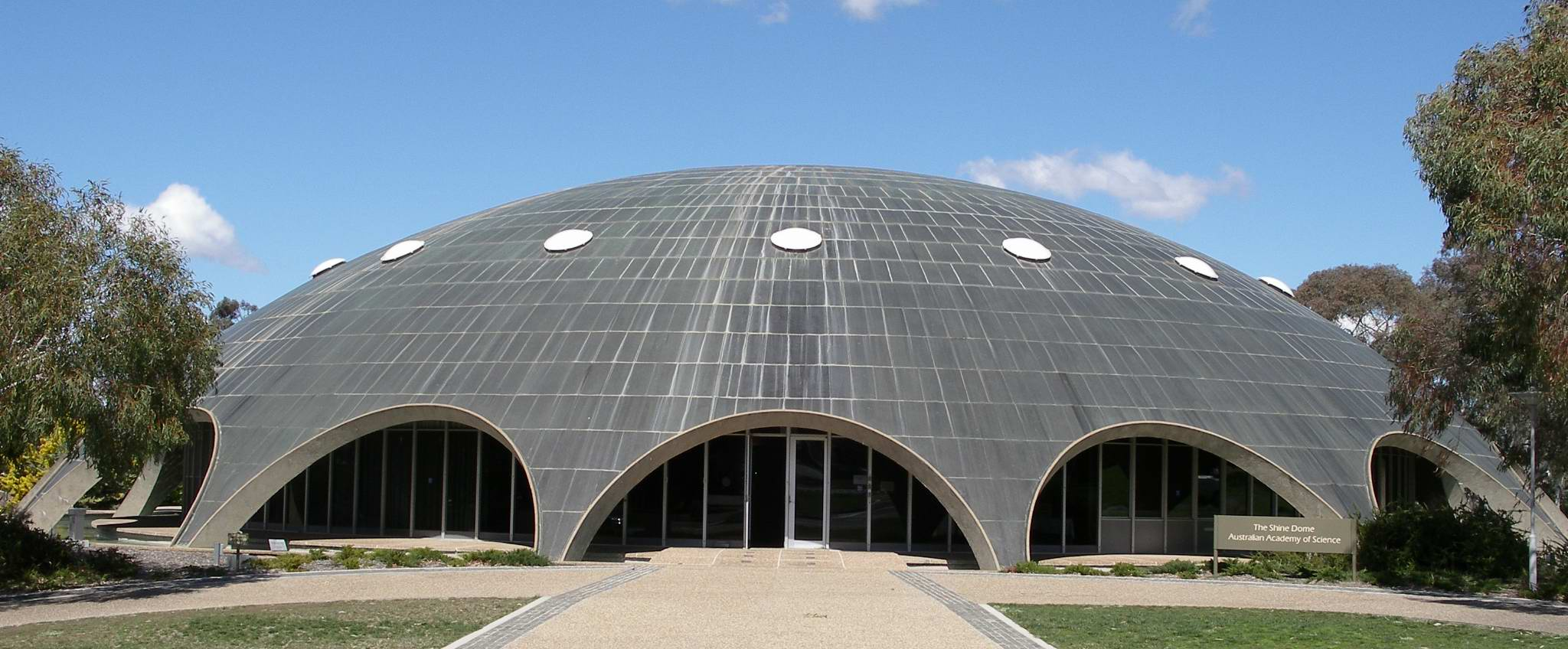
1959 Award, Australian Academy of Science, Canberra

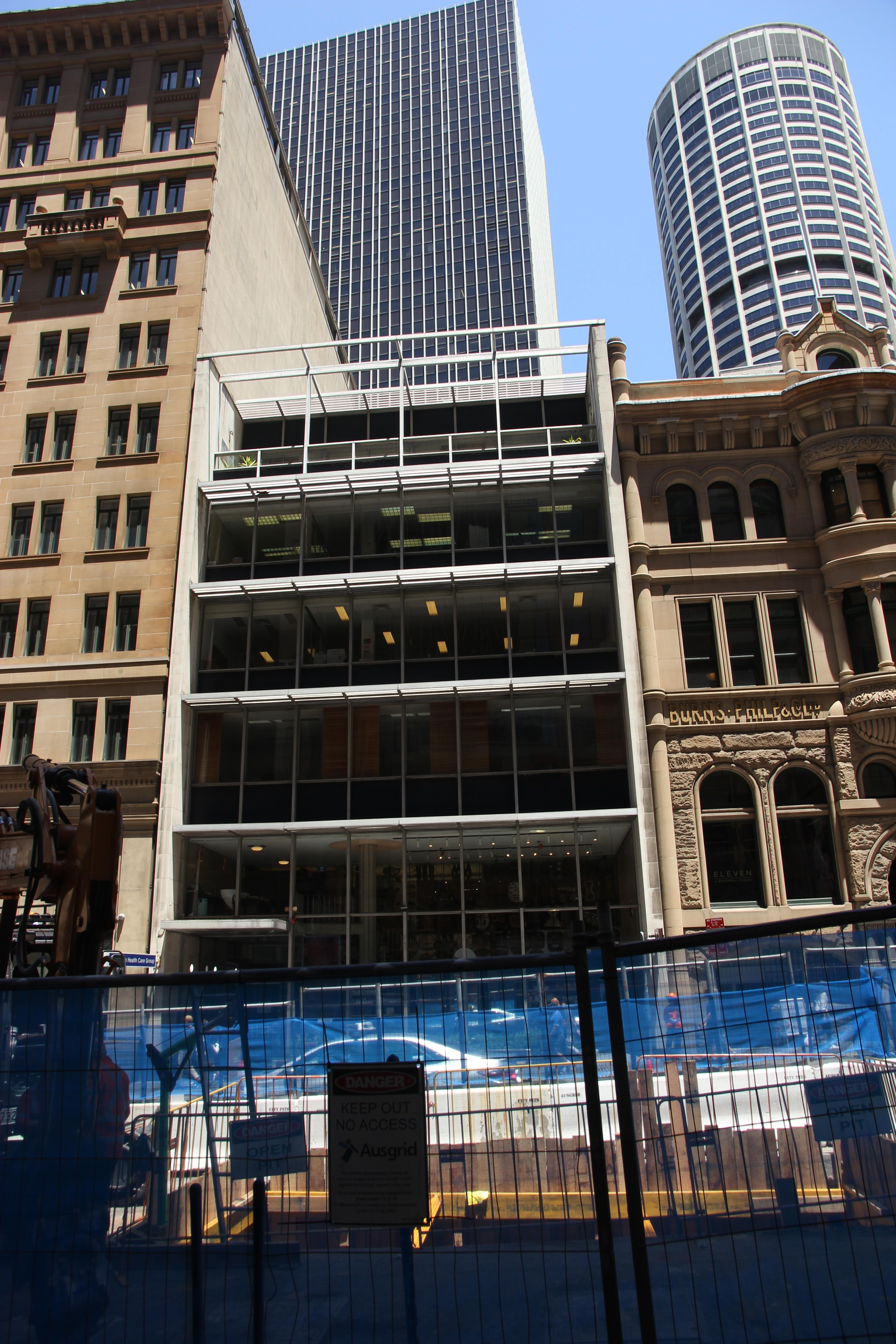
1961 Award, Liner House, Bridge Street

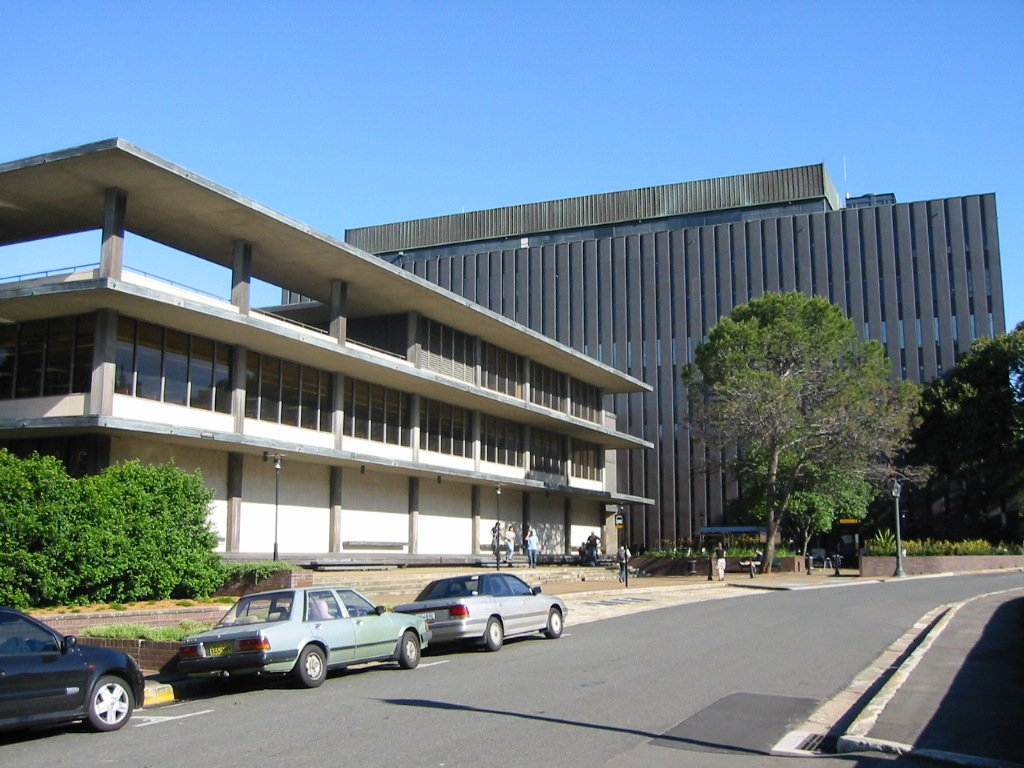
1962 Award, Fisher Library, University of Sydney

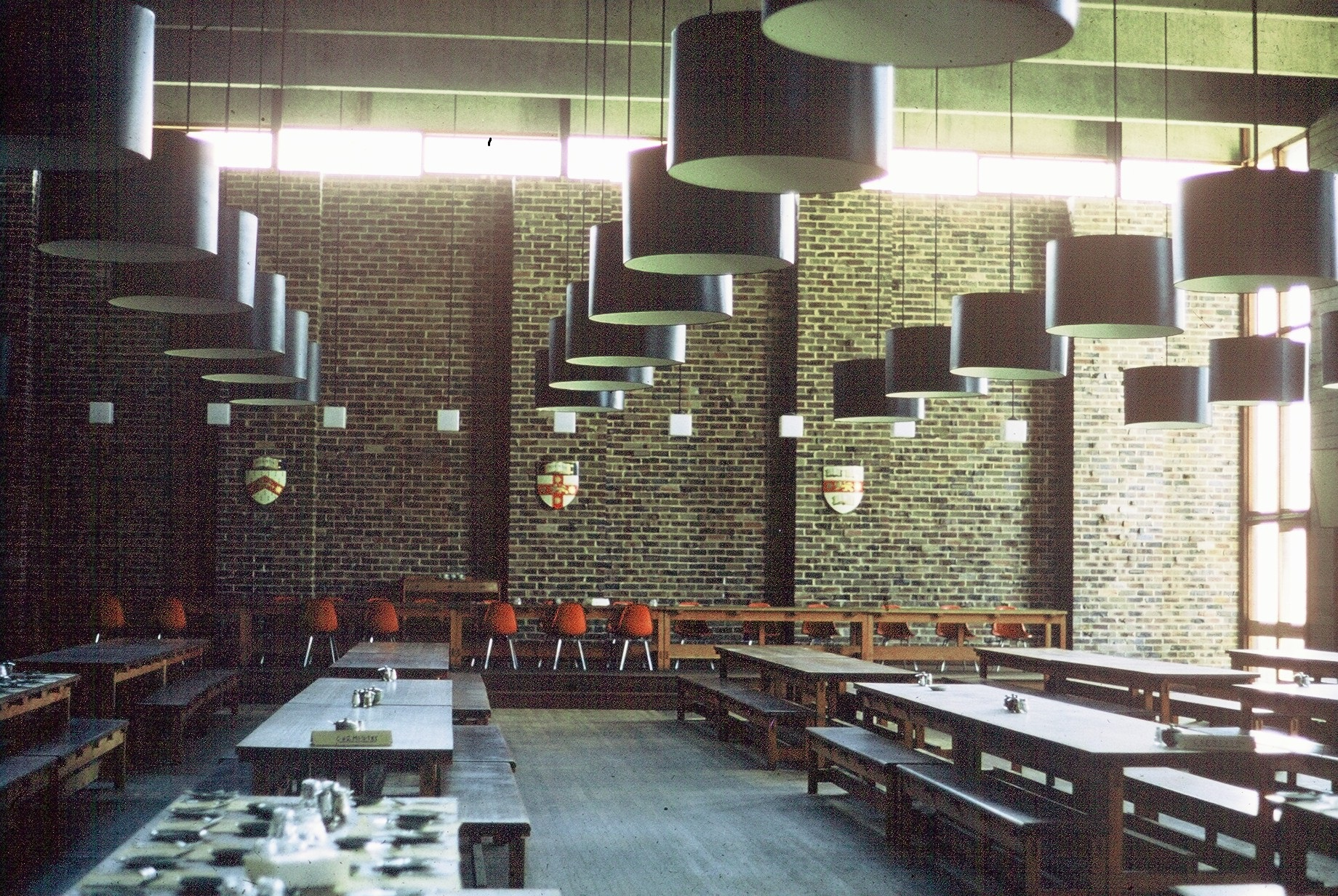
1964 Award, Goldstein Hall, University of NSW

1965 Award, C.B. Alexander Presbyterian Agricultural College (Tocal College)

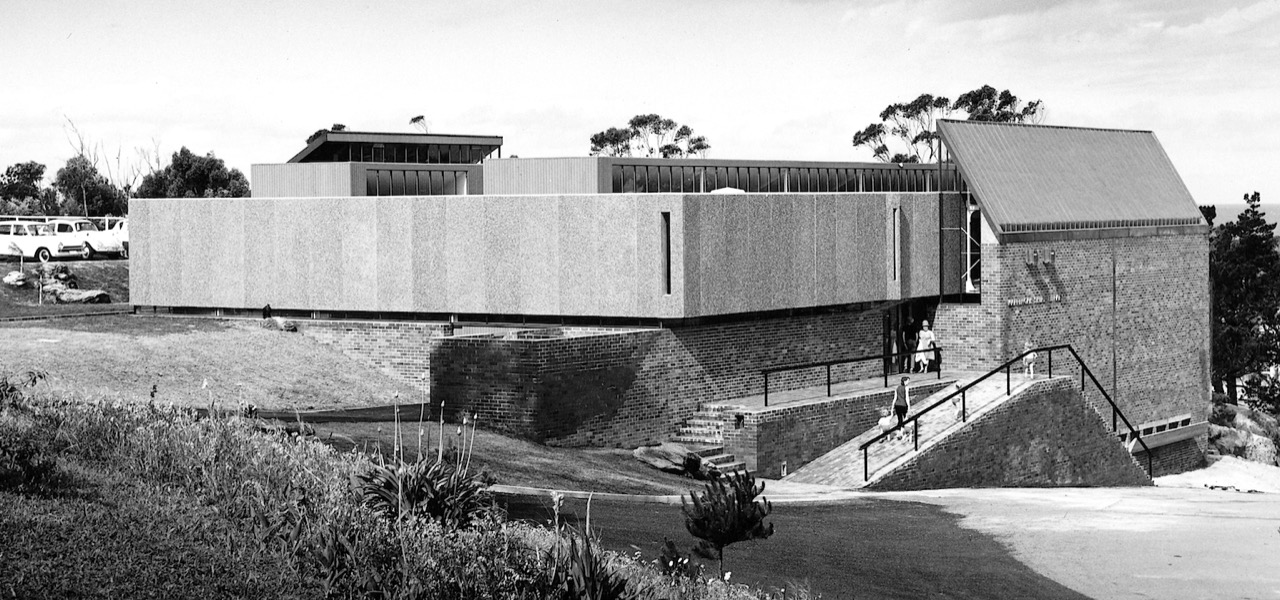
1966 Award, Warringah Shire Library

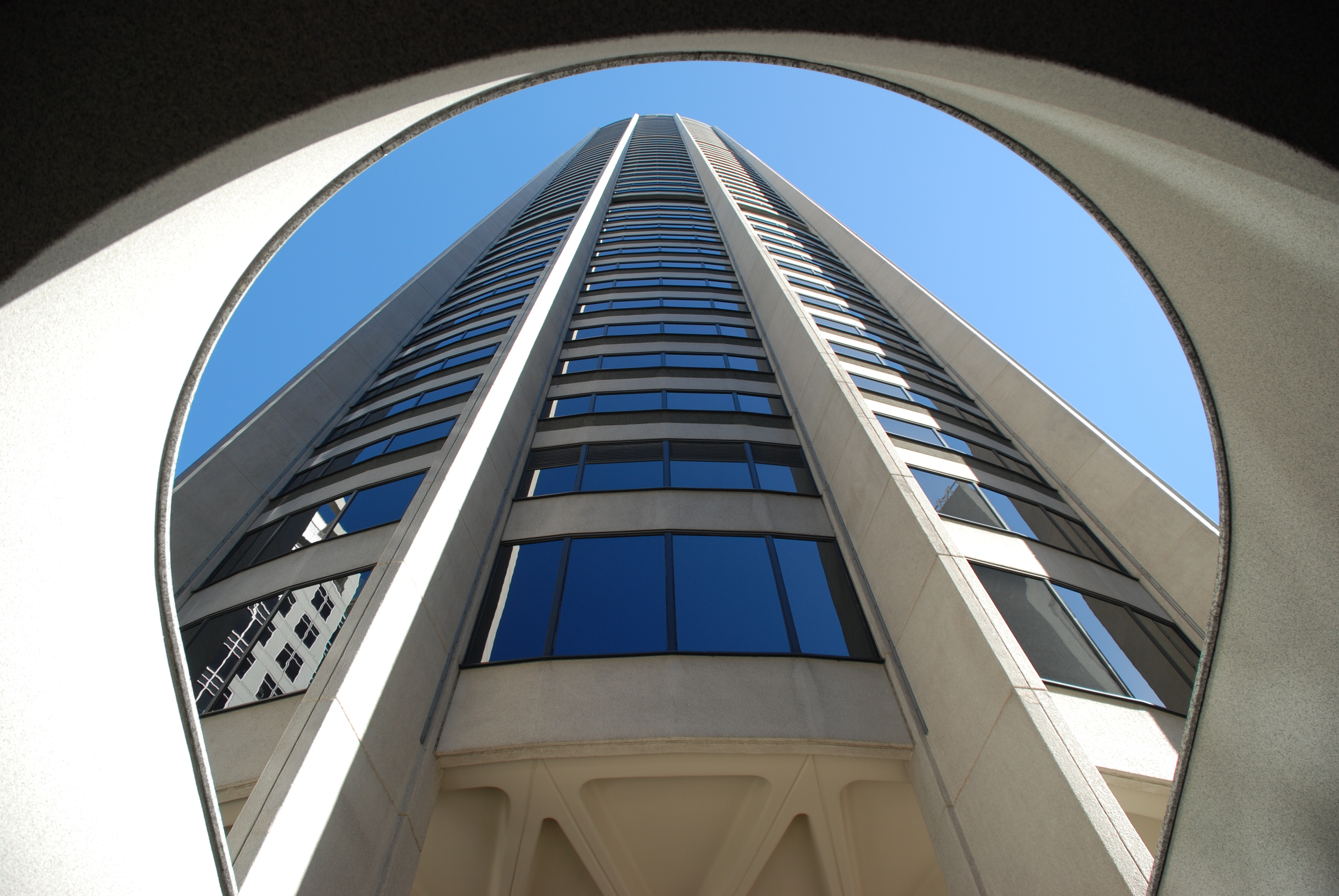
1967 Award, Australia Square

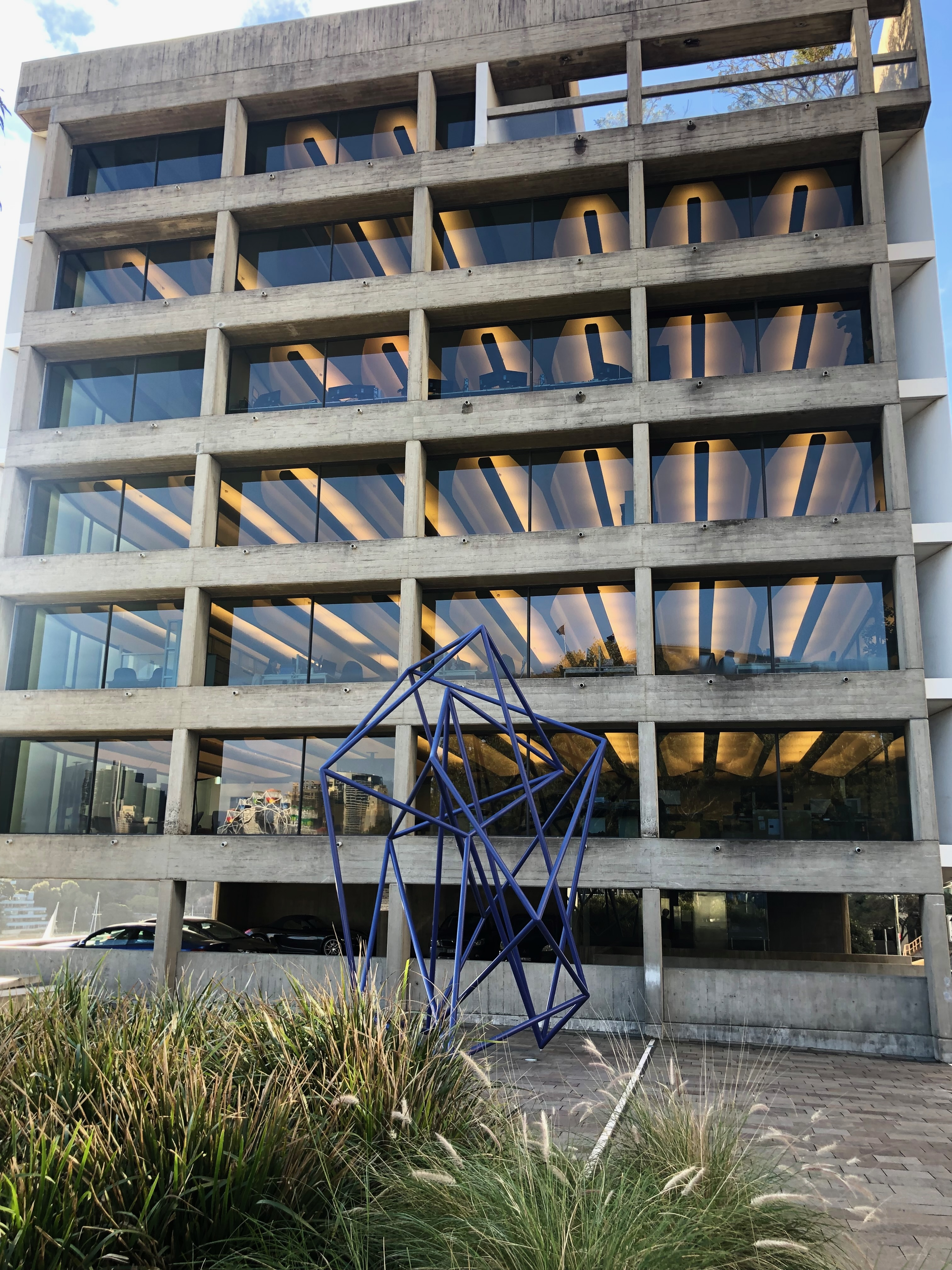
1981 Award, Glen Street Offices, Milsons Point

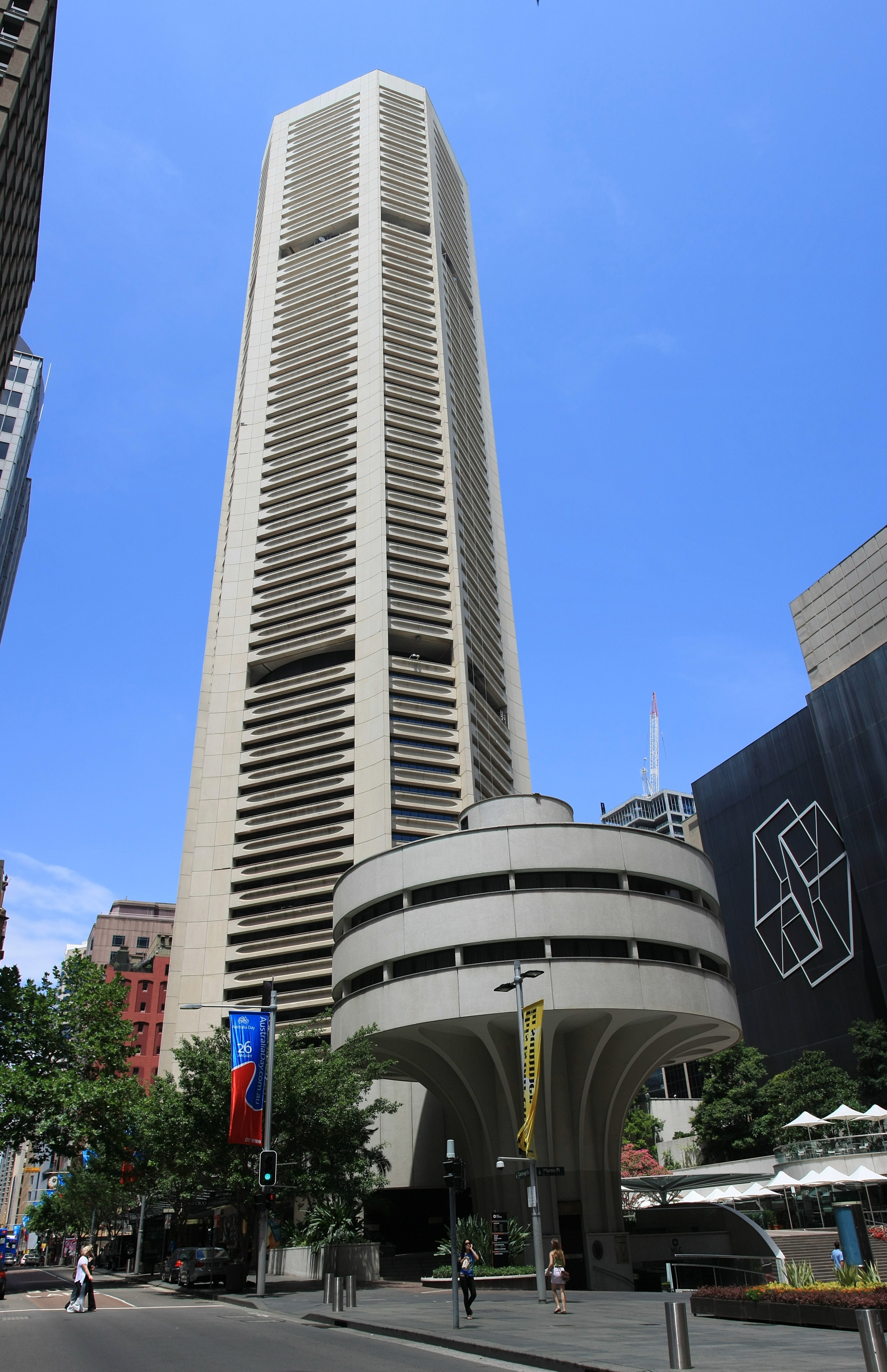
1983 Award, MLC Centre

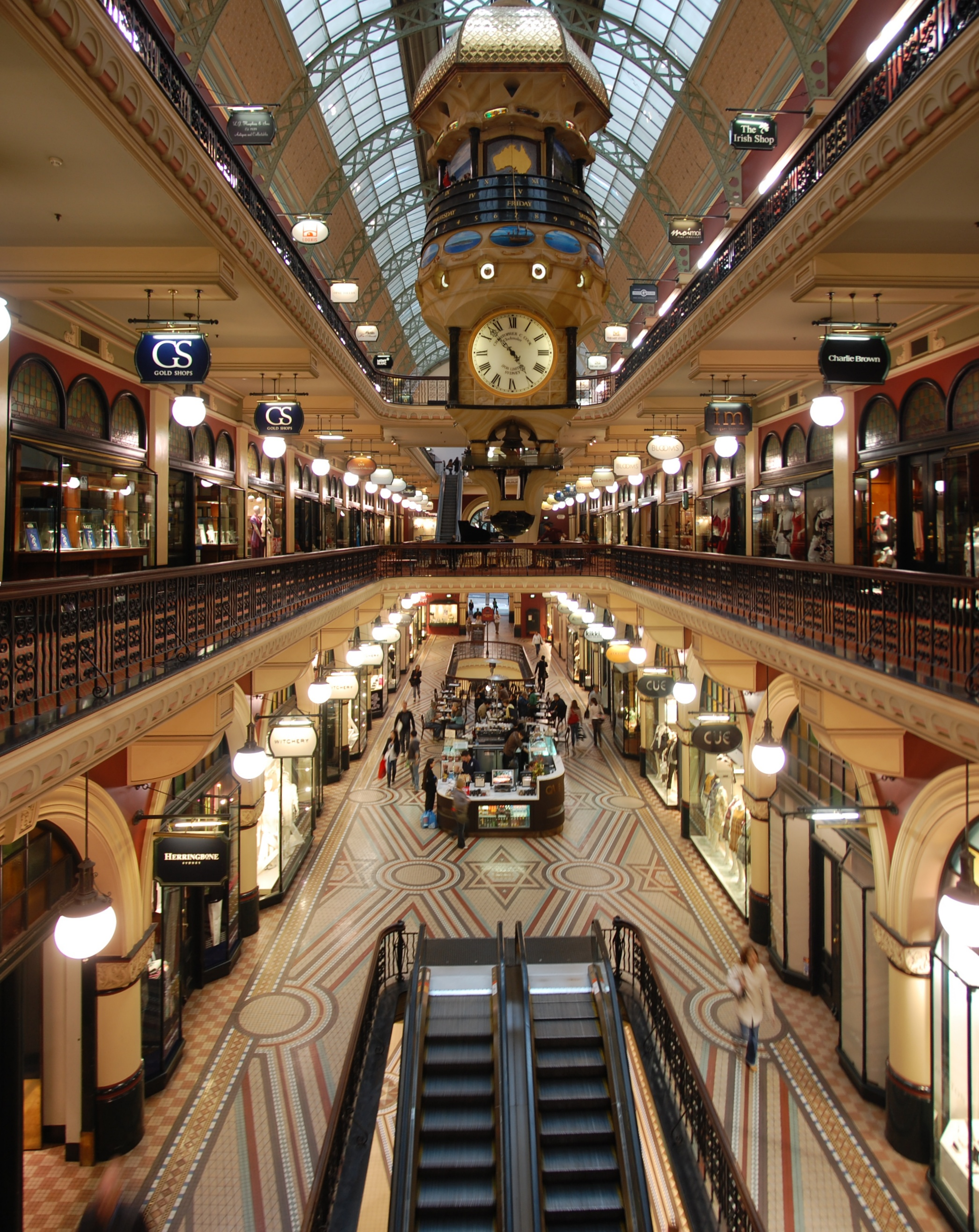
1987 Award, Queen Victoria Building restoration

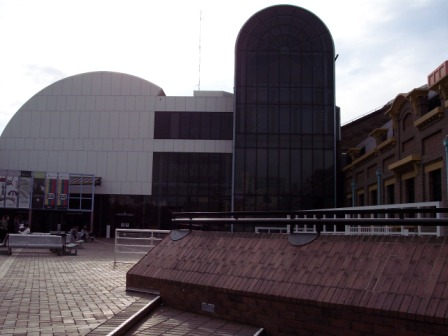
1989 Award, Powerhouse Museum, Ultimo

1989 Award, Art Gallery of NSW extension

1990 Award, Lake Crackenback Village

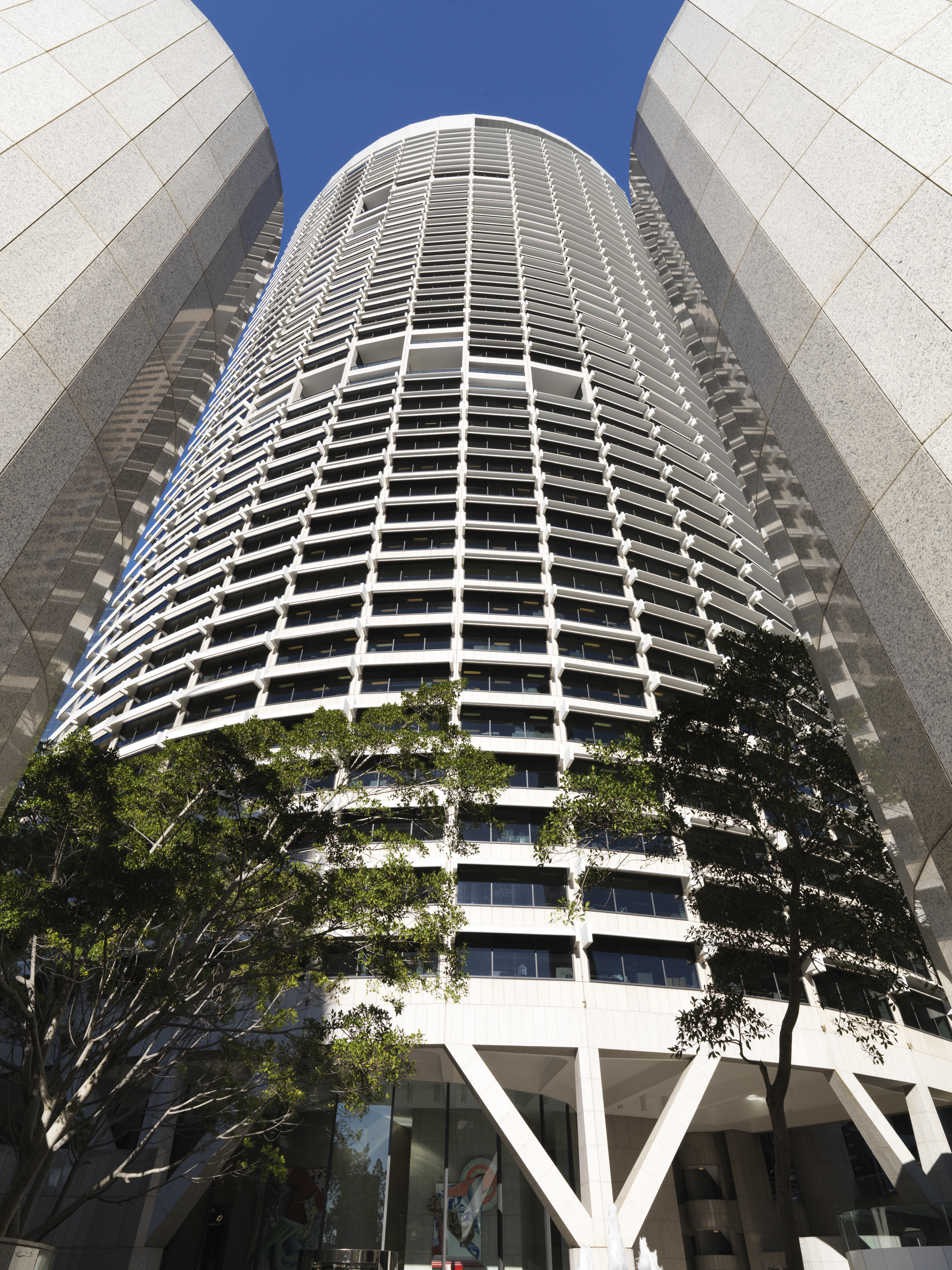
1991 Award, Grosvenor Place, George Street

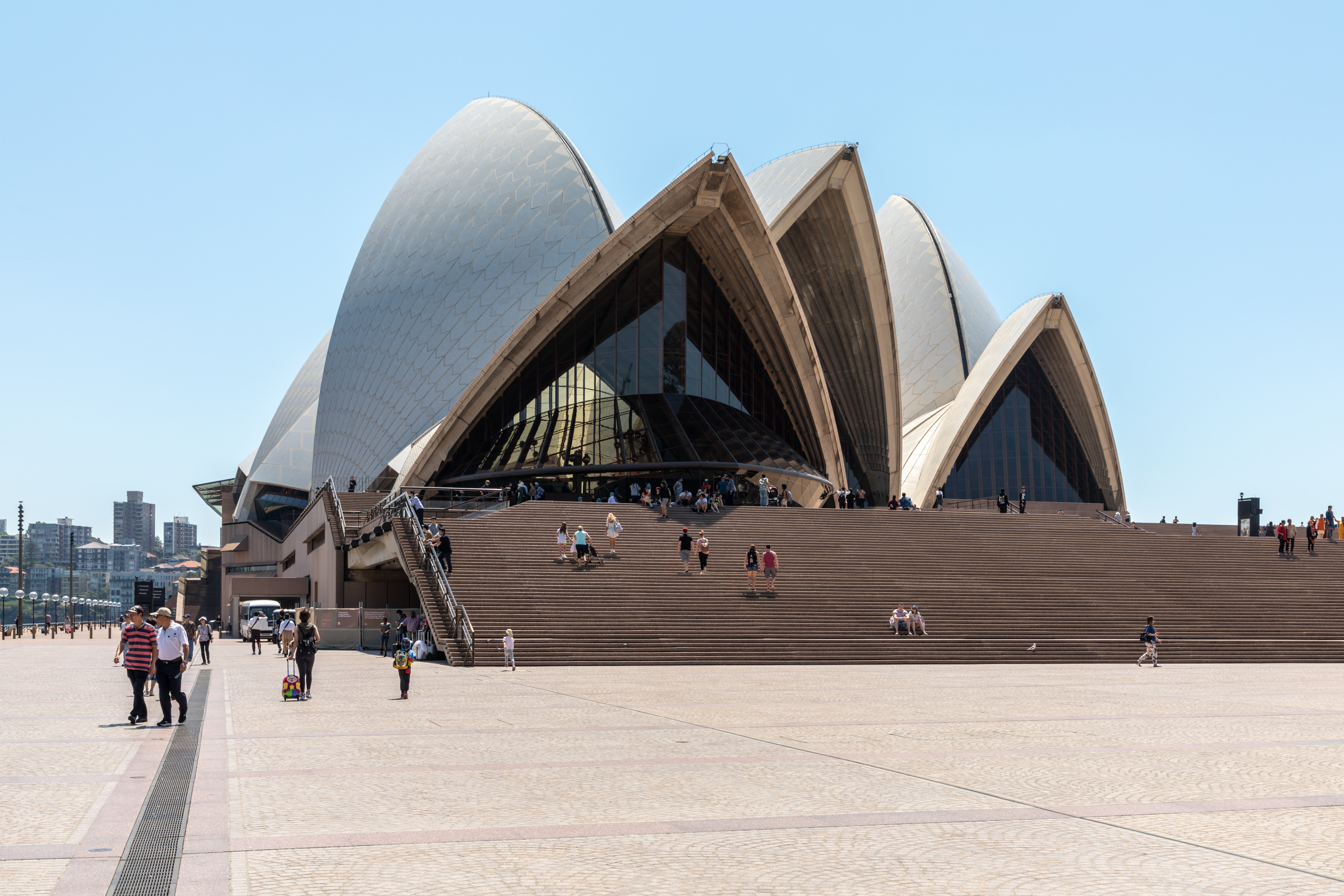
1992 Award, Sydney Opera House

1994 Award, Governor Phillip Tower

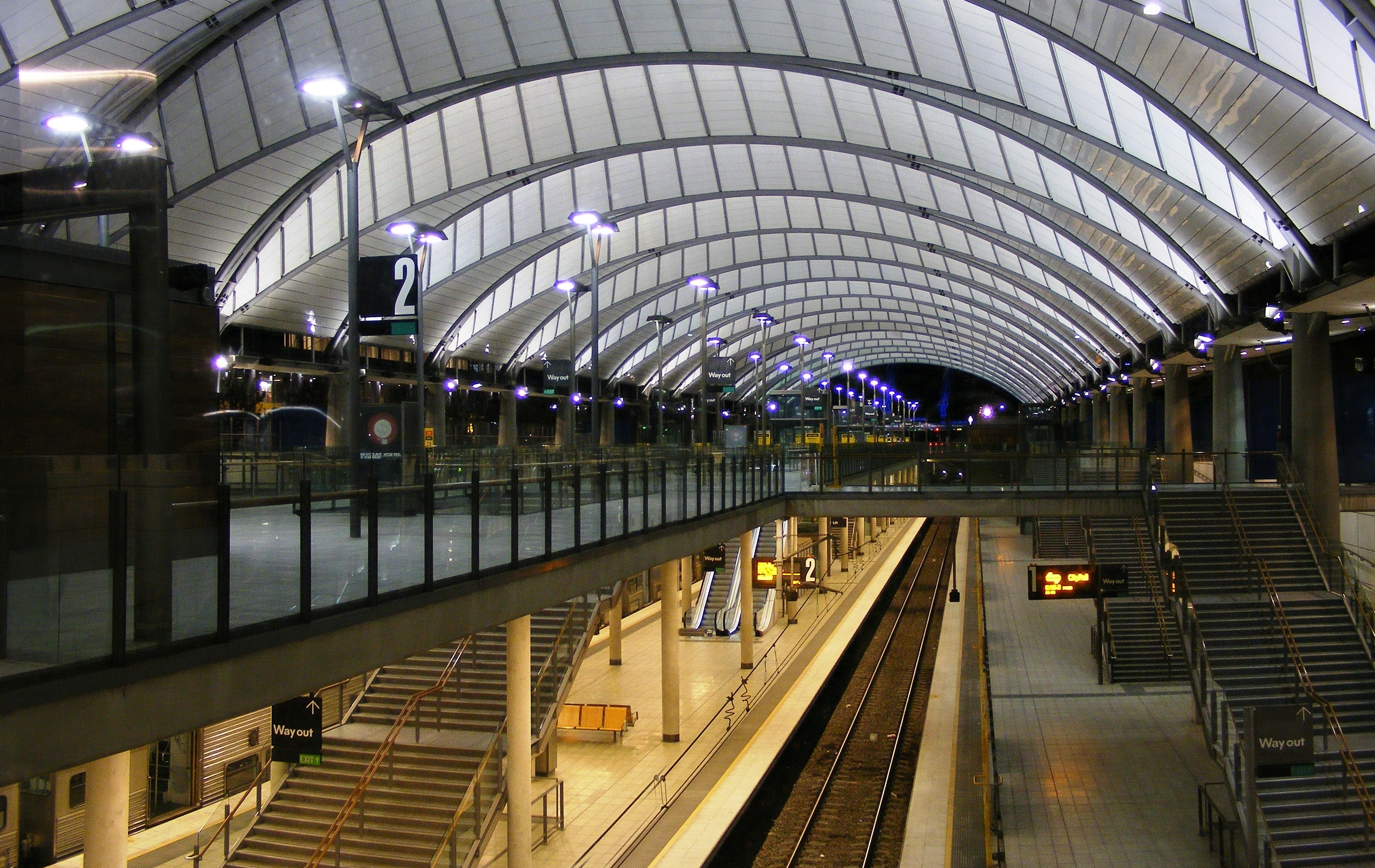
1998 Award, Sydney Olympic Park Station

1999 Award, Boyd Education Centre, Bundanon

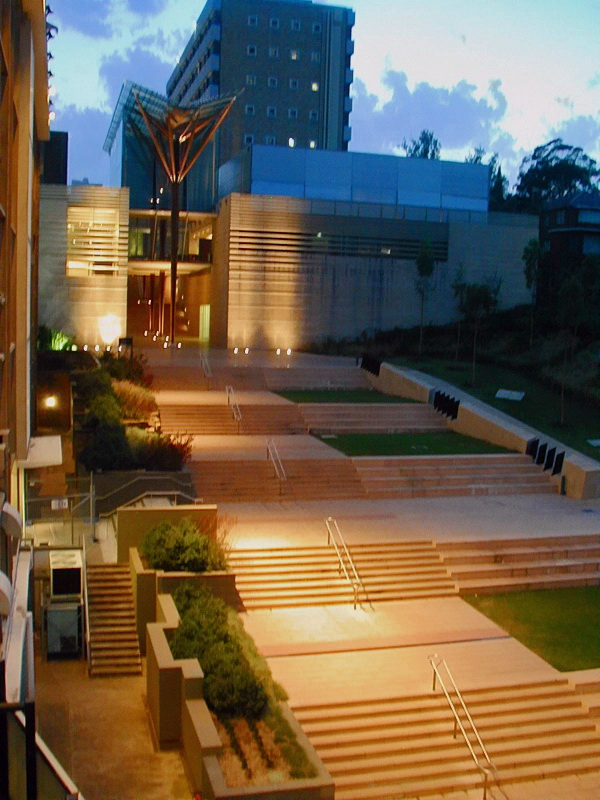
2000 Award, The Scientia, University of NSW

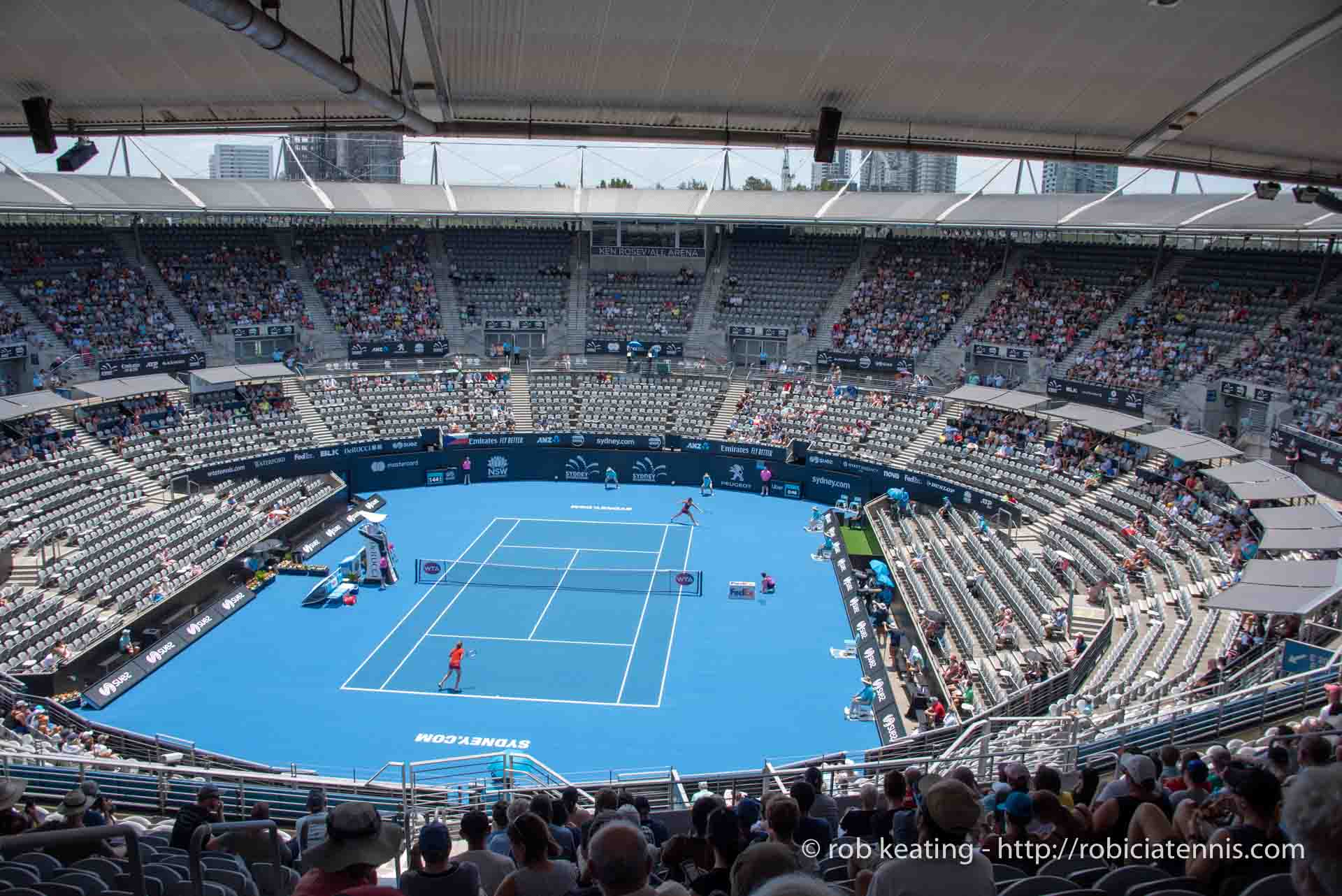
2000 Award, Sydney Olympic Park Tennis Centre

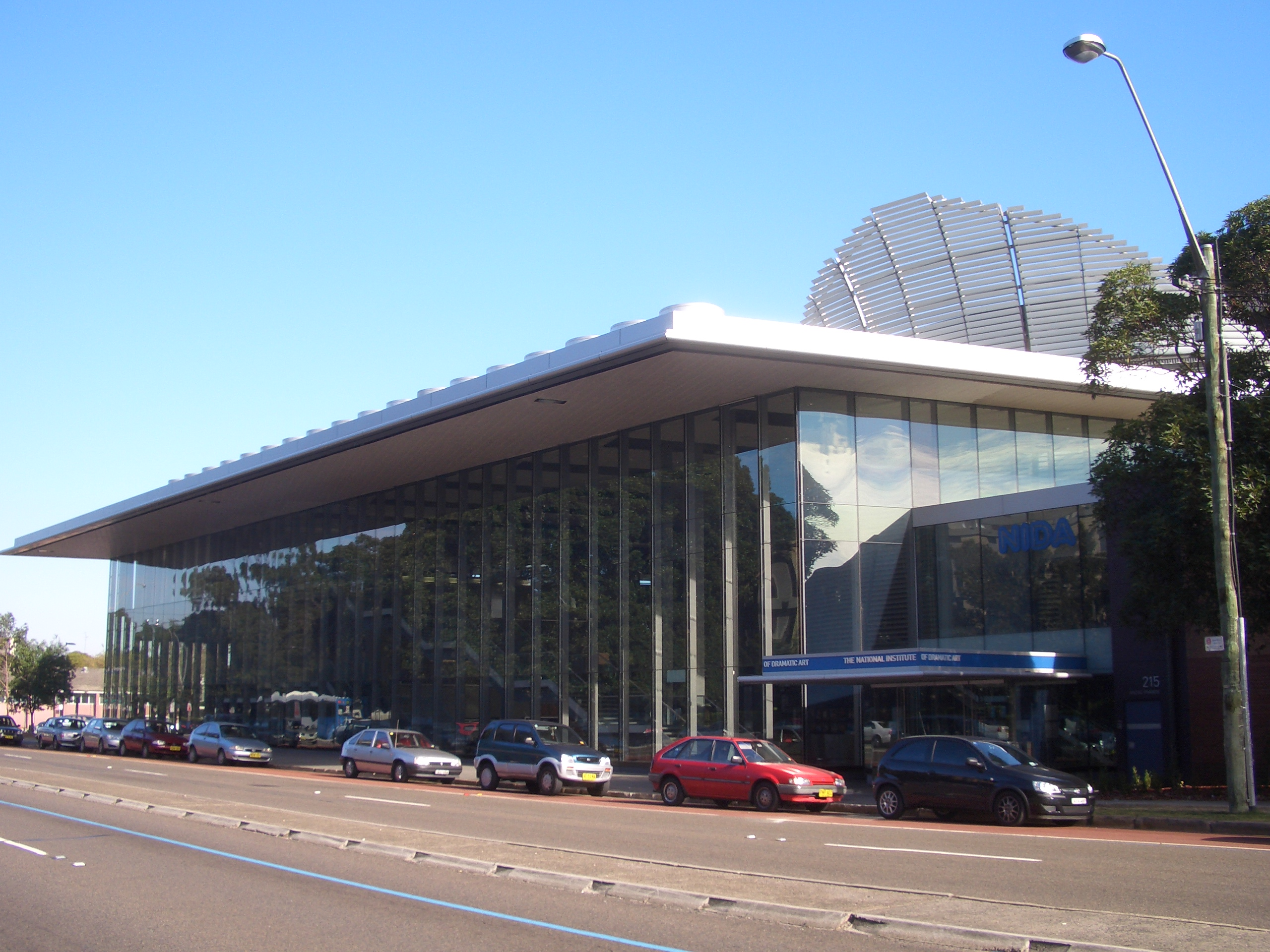
2002 Award, National Institute of Dramatic Art, Kensington

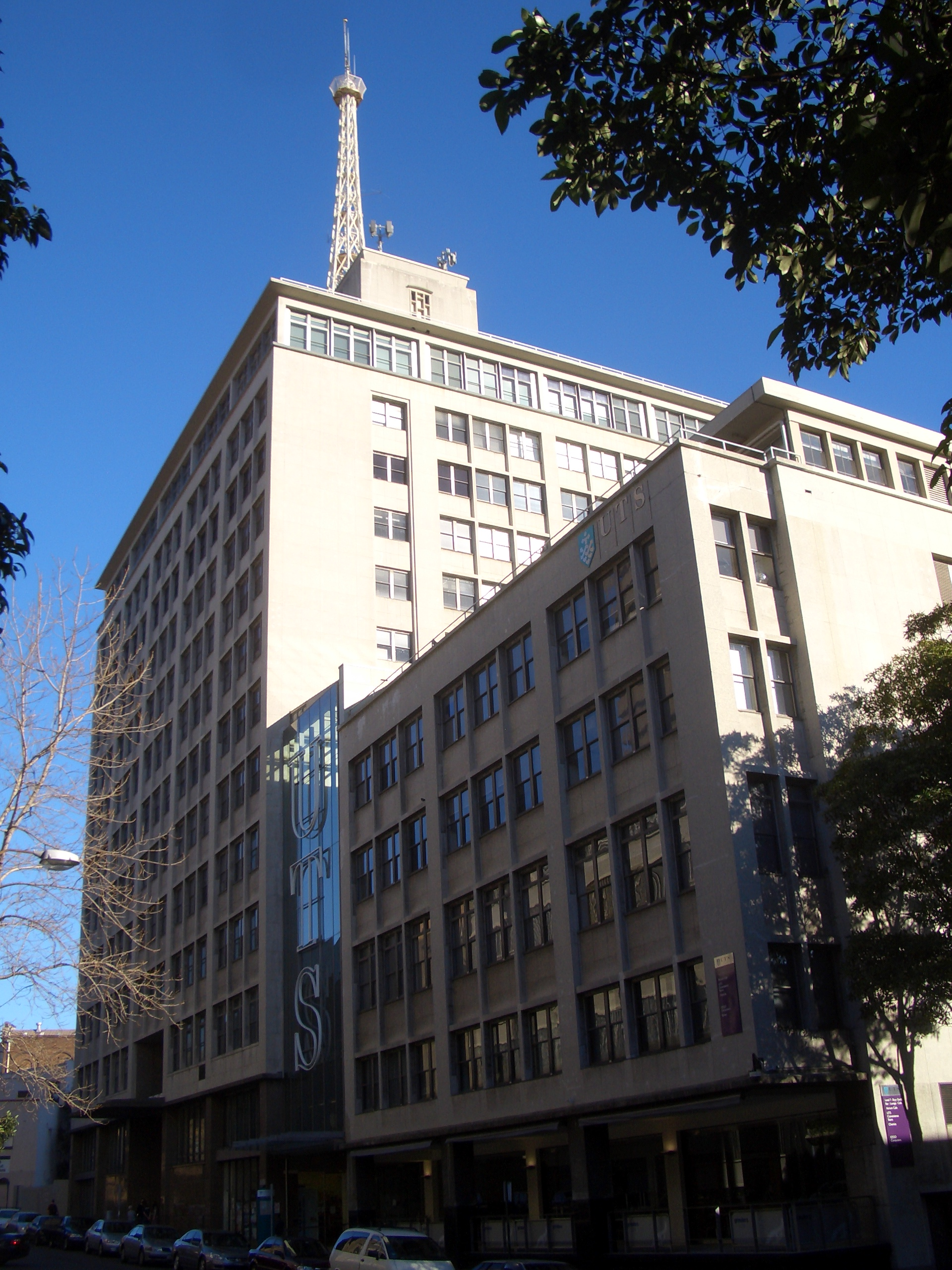
2003 Award, UTS City Campus, Building 10

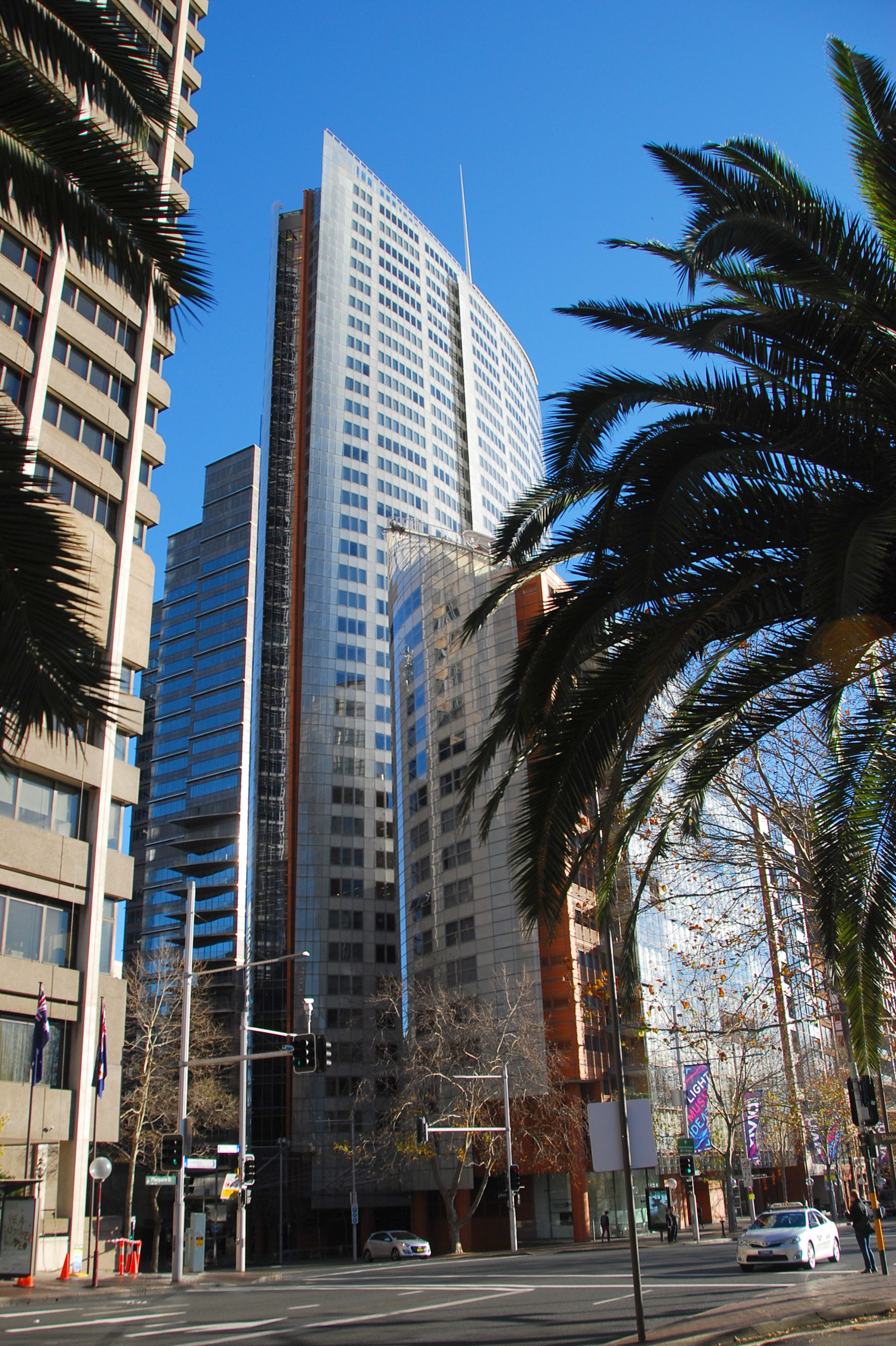
2004 Award, Aurora Place

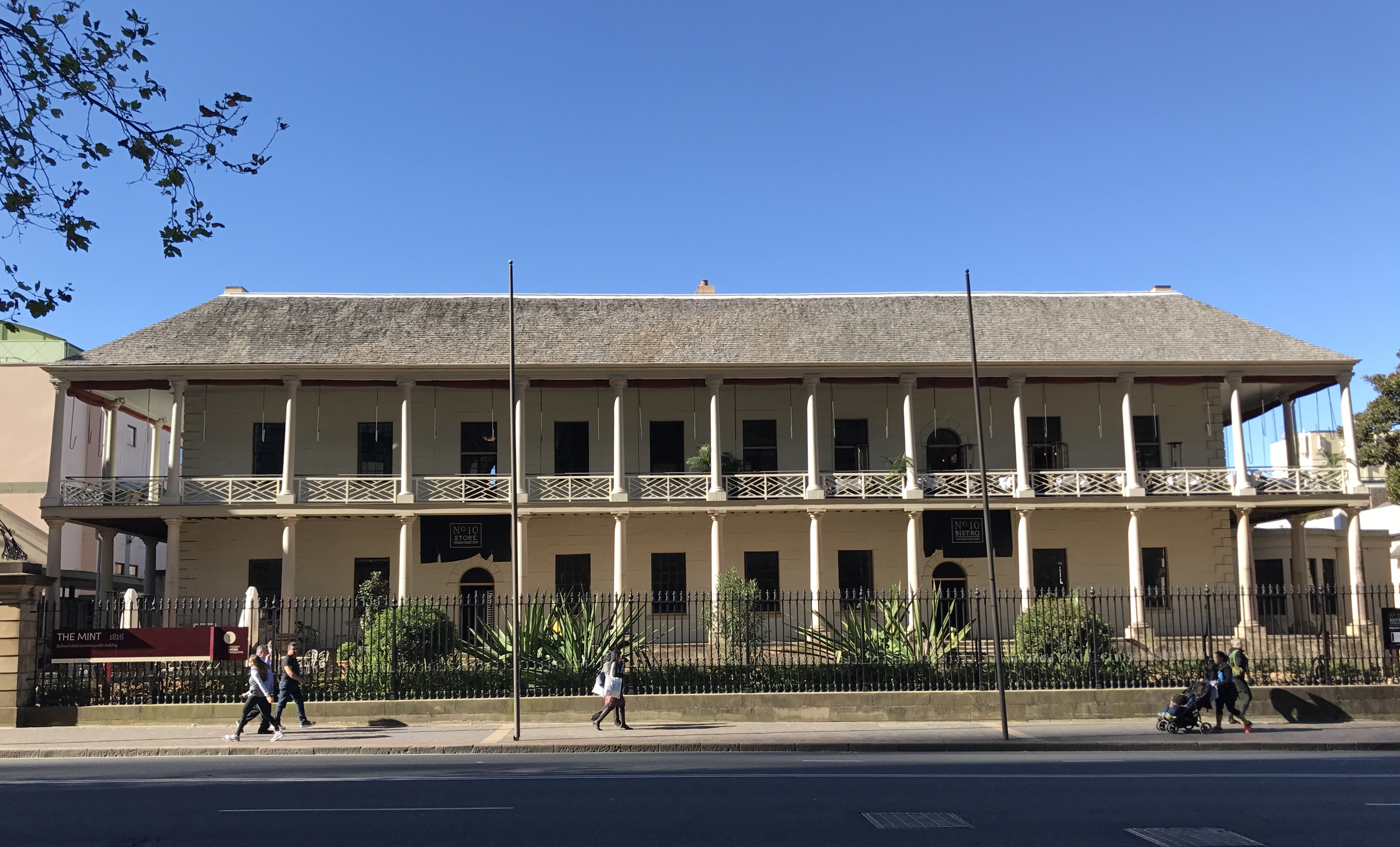
2005 Award, Sydney Mint, Macquarie Street

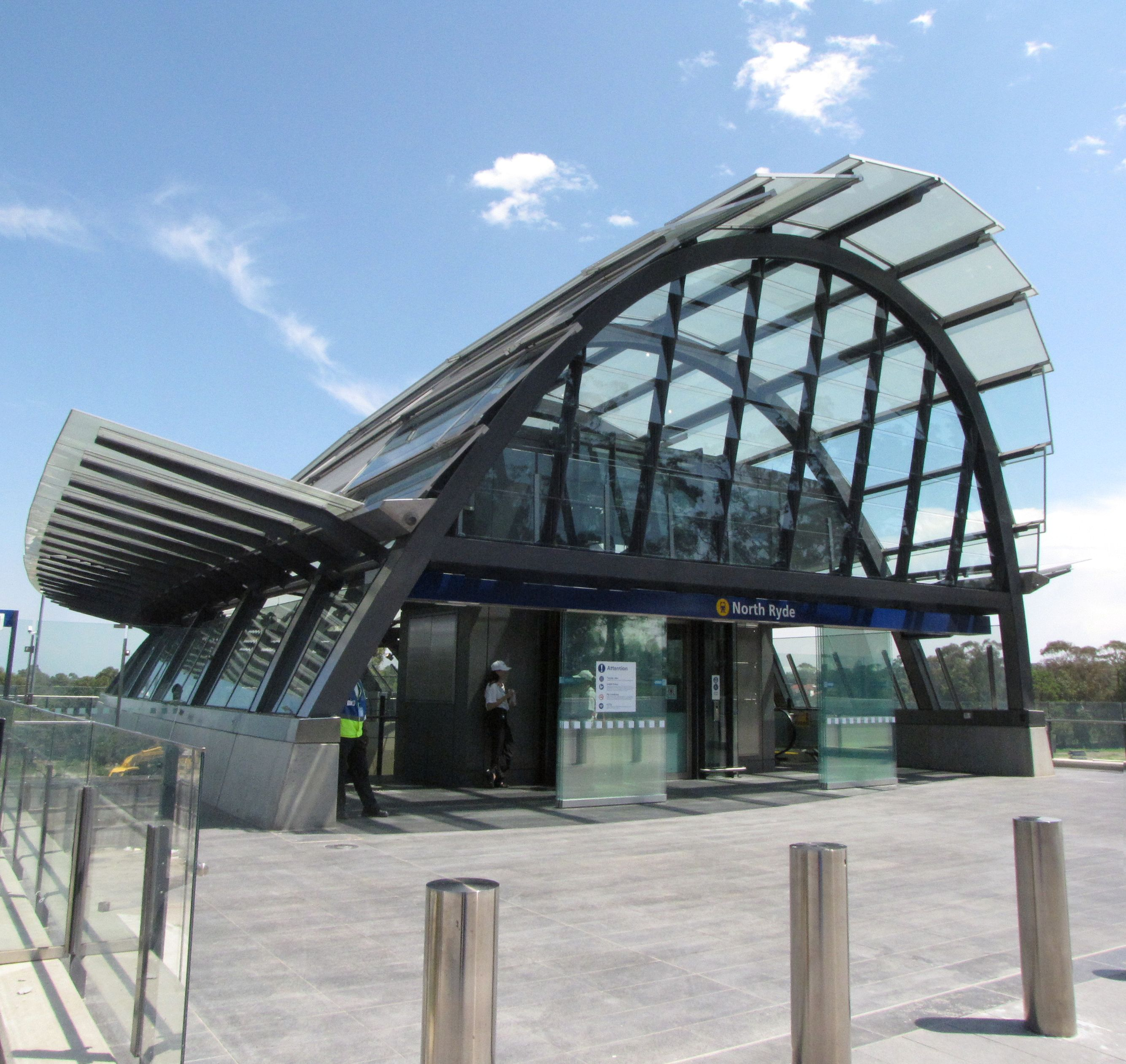
2010 Award, Epping to Chatswood Rail Link

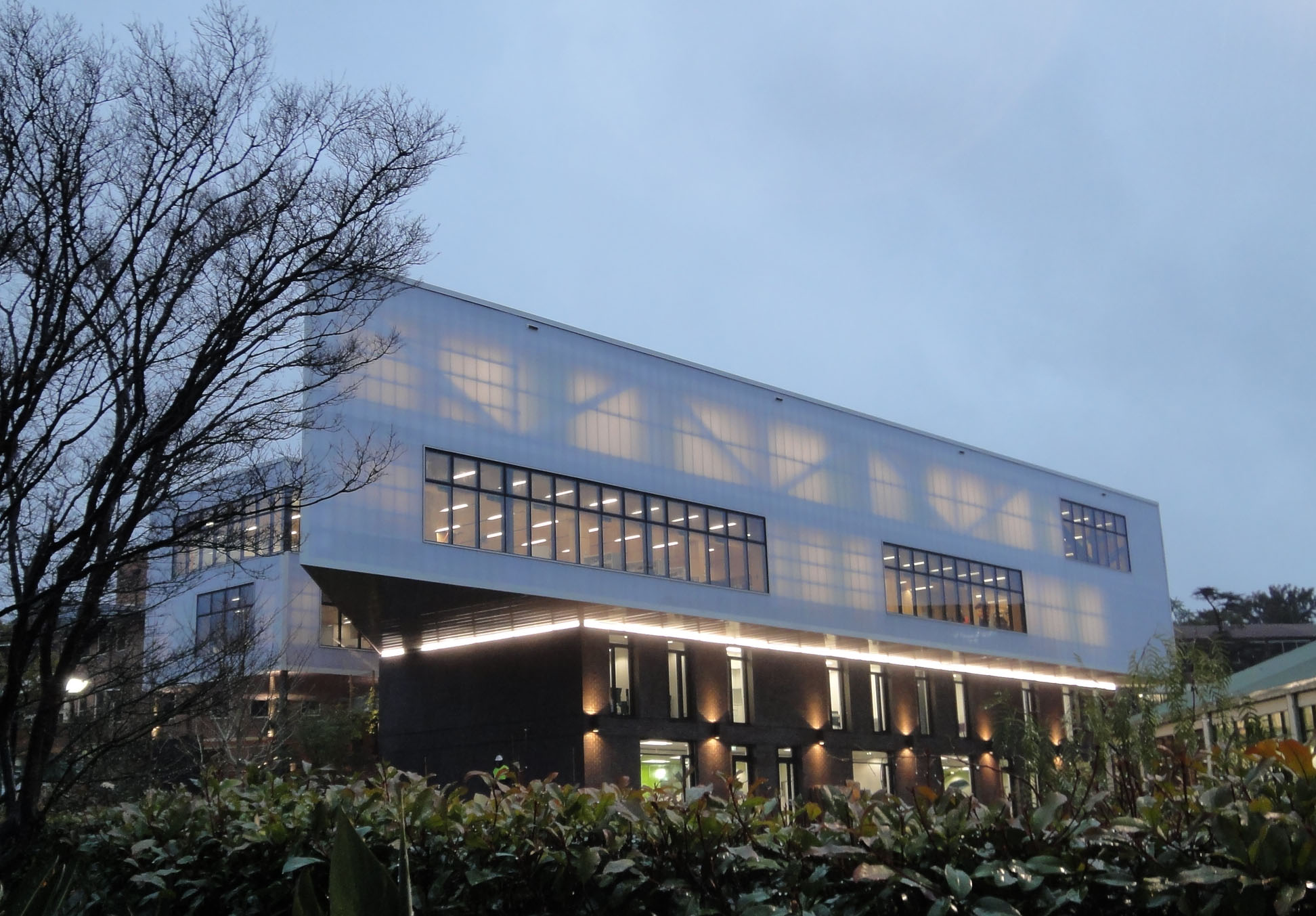
2012 Award, Mabel Fidler Building, Ravenswood School for Girls

2013 Award, Waterloo Community Centre

2017 Award, Orange Regional Museum

2019 Award, The Riverlink, Maitland

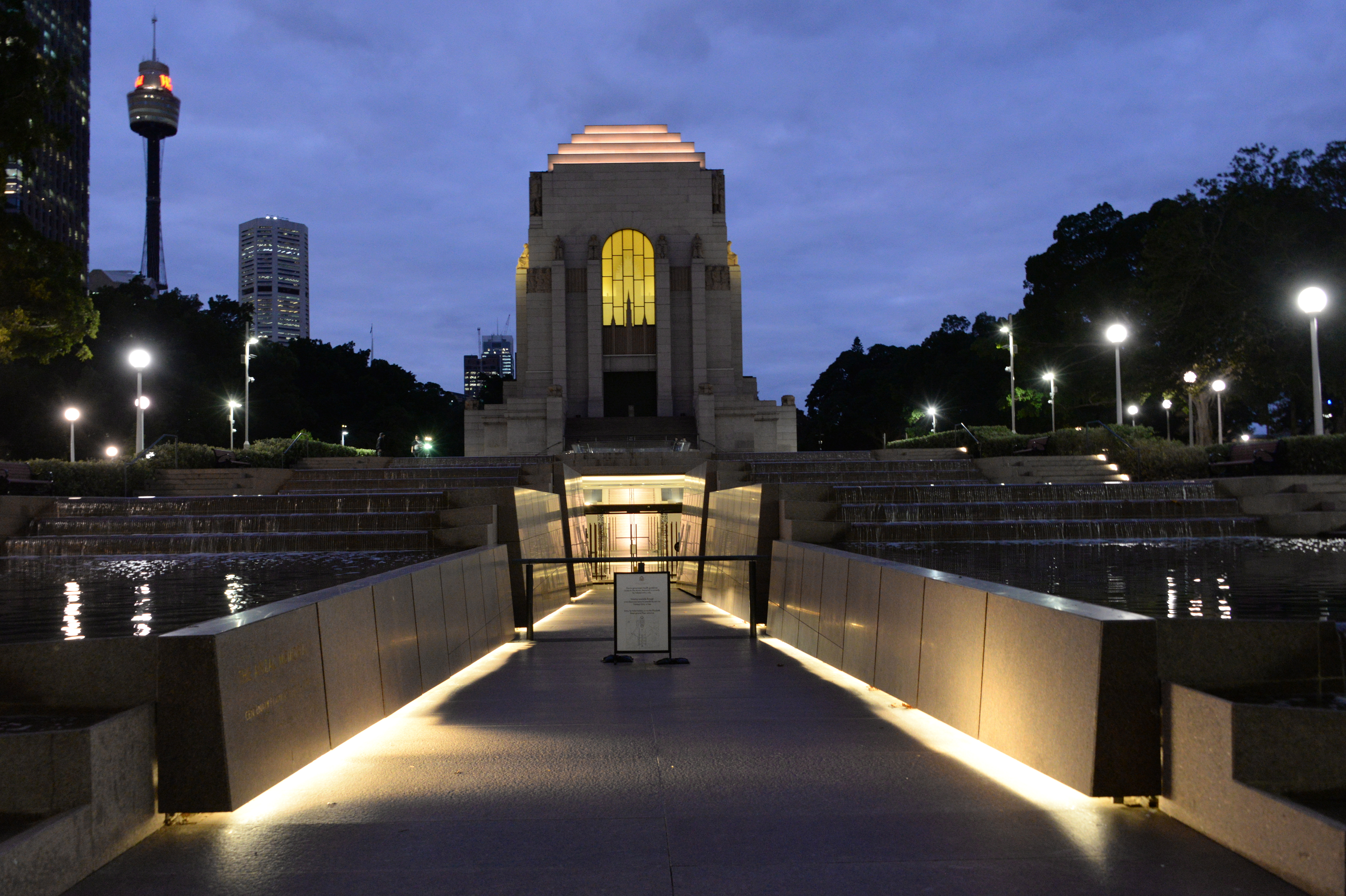
2020 Award, ANZAC Memorial, Hyde Park

2022 Award, Bundanon Art Museum and Bridge

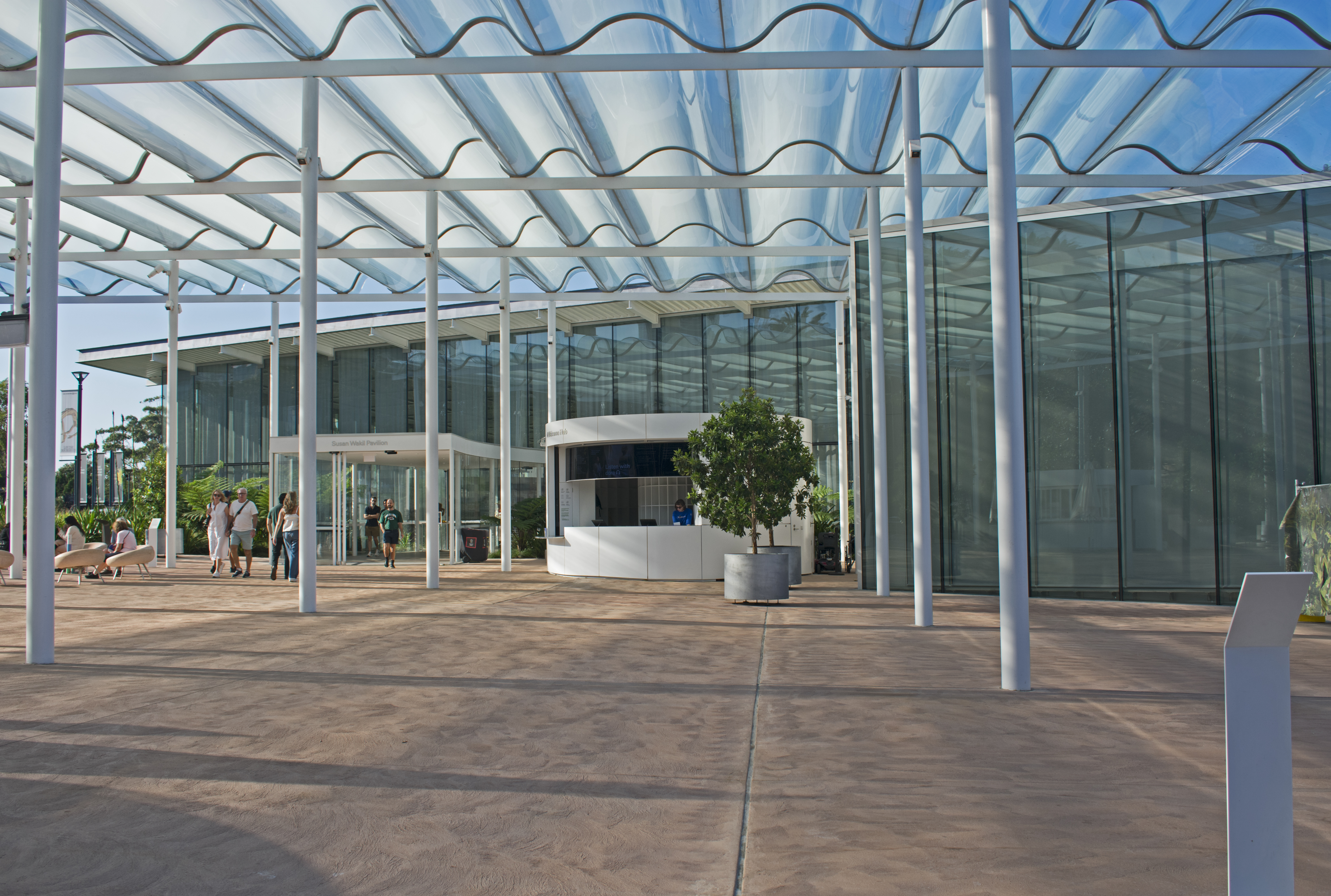
2023 Award, Sydney Modern, AGNSW

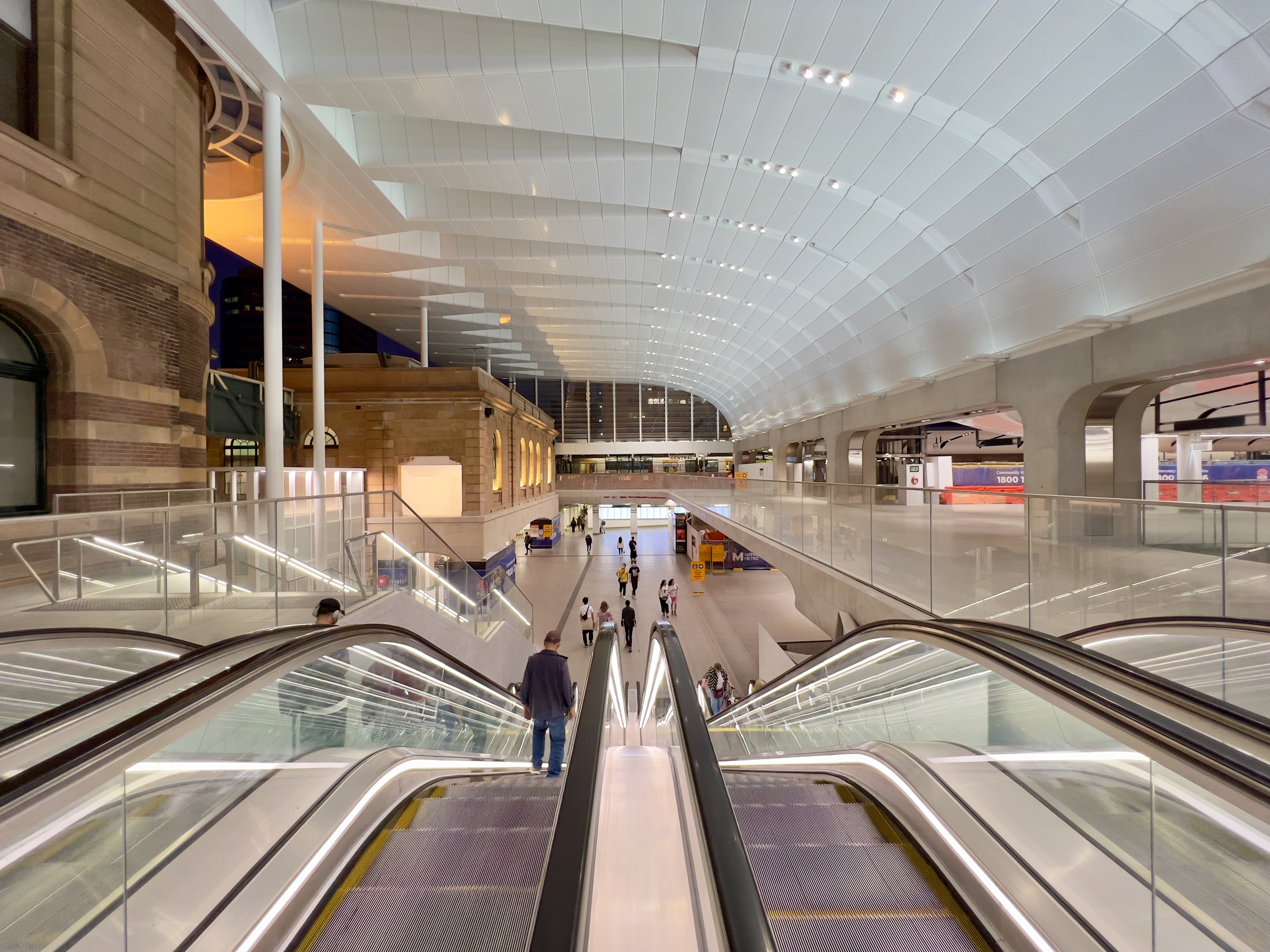
2026 Award, Central Station Redevelopment (2018—2024)

== See also ==
- Australian Institute of Architects Awards and Prizes
- Architecture of Australia
- Victorian Architecture Medal
- Wilkinson Award
- Buildings and structures awarded the Sir John Sulman Medal
- Recipients of the Royal Australian Institute of Architects’ Gold Medal
