= Candalepas Associates =

Australian architecture firm

Candalepas Associates is an architecture firm founded in 1999 by Angelo Candalepas in Sydney, Australia. It received numerous state and national awards by the Australian Institute of Architects. Candalepas' design has been influenced by the architecture of Alvar Aalto, Carlo Scarpa and Jørn Utzon.

== Selected projects ==
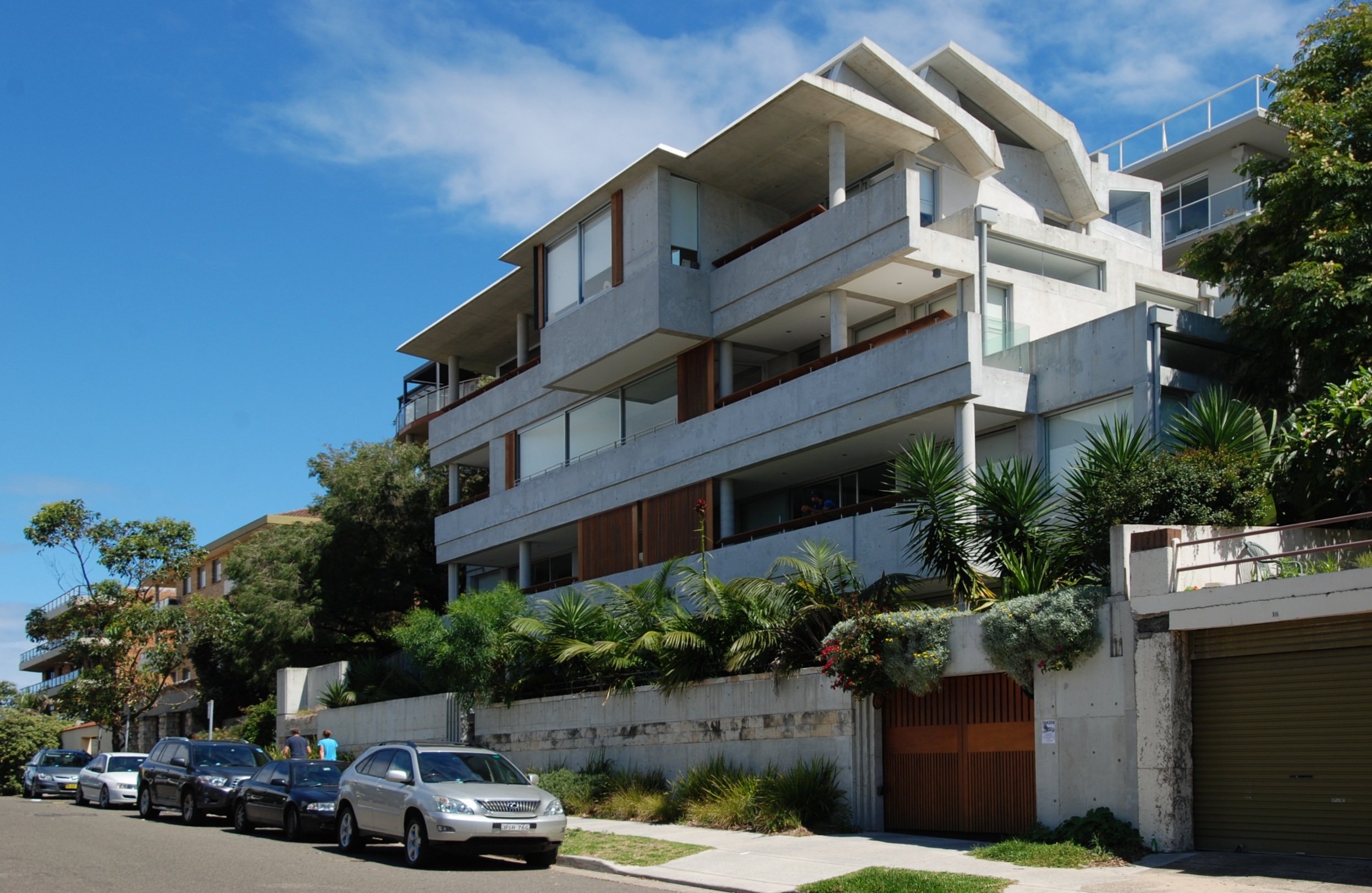
Francis Street Apartments, Bondi

- 2005 Pindari Apartments, Randwick, Sydney
- 2008 All Saints Grammar School, Belmore, Sydney, Winner of Sir John Sulman Medal, 2009
- 2010 Waterloo Street Apartments, Surry Hills, Sydney. AIA National Award
- 2011 Waterloo Street Apartments, Surry Hills, Sydney. AIA Frederick Romberg Award, 2011
- 2011 Francis Street Apartments, Bondi, Sydney. Architecture Award Multiple Housing
- 2013 Multiple Housing 29–35 Prince Street, Cronulla. AIA National Award
- 2013 Multiple Housing 29–35 Prince Street, Cronulla. AIA Aaron Bolot Award
- 2016 AHL Headquarters, 478 George Street, Sydney. Harry Seidler Award
- 2016 St Andrews House, Sydney. AIA National Award
- 2016 St Andrews House, Sydney. AIA Premier’s Prize
- 2017 President Avenue, Sutherland. AIA Aaron M Bolot Award
- 2018 Punchbowl Mosque, Punchbowl, Sydney. Winner of Sir John Sulman Medal, 2018
- 2019 North Rocks, Sydney. AIA Aaron Bolot Award
- 2022 Church of the Living God. AIA NSW Architecture Award^{[}
