= Kids the Light of our Lives =

Internet forum dedicated to hosting child sex abuse content

Kids the Light of our Lives [sic] was an Internet chat forum which was dedicated to the sexual exploitation of minors. The forum hosted images and live streaming videos of children and babies being subjected to sexual abuse. It was part of an international child sex ring of over 700 individuals, which was smashed through international cooperation. Acting from information from the Virtual Global Taskforce, the British police made one of the largest online CSAM hauls of all time.

== History ==
Timothy David Martyn Cox (born 1979), an alleged child sexual offender, ran the forum from his bedroom at his parents' farm in Buxhall, Suffolk, where he also worked at the family's micro brewery. Cox's online handle was "Son of God", G.O.D. being his pseudonym at another site closed down a year earlier, following which he launched a successor to meet the demand. Cox's computer hard disk was discovered with 75,960 illegal images stored on it, and evidence was found that Cox had distributed up to 11,491 images to other users on the site.

Cox was arrested in September 2006 on nine offences under Possession and Distribution of Indecent Images of Children. Cox was convicted on 18 June 2007 of running, and was given an indeterminate prison sentence at Ipswich Crown Court. He will not be eligible for release until authorities are satisfied that he presents no further risk to the public. Following his arrest, police continued to run the site for 10 days, posing as Cox in an attempt to discover the identities of other suspected child sexual offenders using the site, although they did not distribute illegal images.

In September 2006, Gordon Mackintosh, 33, from Welwyn Garden City, attempted to resurrect the forum following Cox's disappearance as host. Mackintosh was apparently behind the usernames "silentblackheart" and "lust4skoolgurls". The Child Exploitation and Online Protection Centre, working with Hertfordshire Police, once again infiltrated the forum, and arrested Mackintosh on January 9, 2007. Mackintosh pleaded guilty to 27 charges, and is awaiting sentence.

The police operation lasted some 10 months, and resulted in the arrest of 700 men, and the rescue of 31 children. Further arrests are expected as the operation is continuing in the United States. Another 24 suspects are from Canada. Det. Sgt. Kim Scanlan of the Toronto police child exploitation section said a total of 12 arrests were made in Ontario, and the rest were made in other provinces.
