= Jim Gamble =

British police officer

Jim Gamble QPM
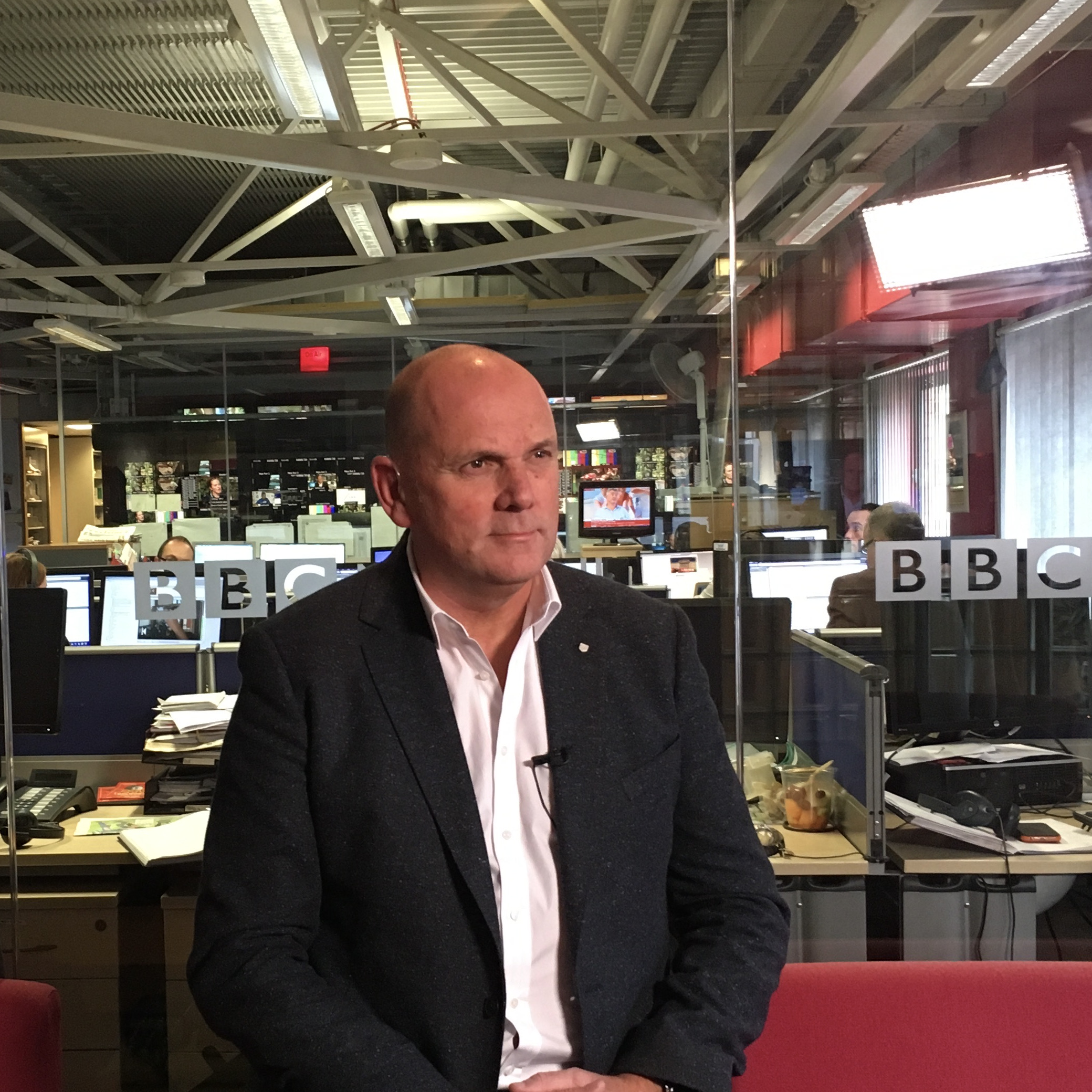
- Born: November 1959 (age 66); Bangor, Northern Ireland
- Occupation: CEO of INEQE Safeguarding Group

James Gamble, QPM (born November 1959), is a Northern Irish former police officer and a former head of the Belfast region for the now disbanded RUC Special Branch.

Gamble was the head of the Child Exploitation and Online Protection Command (CEOP) Centre in the United Kingdom until 2010, and is now CEO of the INEQE Safeguarding Group.

== Career ==
=== RUC Special Branch ===
Gamble's father was in the Royal Air Force. Before joining the Royal Ulster Constabulary (RUC) as a constable, Gamble served in the Royal Military Police. Early in his career he was appointed head of the RUC's anti-terrorist intelligence unit in Belfast, then Deputy Director General (with the rank of deputy chief constable) of the National Crime Squad, which in April 2006 merged into the Serious Organised Crime Agency (Soca). He was also the head of the Belfast Region of the RUC Special Branch.

==== Application to lead PSNI ====
In 2009, Sir Hugh Orde resigned as Police Service of Northern Ireland chief constable. Gamble applied for the position, which he stated was his primary goal, but was eventually unsuccessful with the position being filled by Matt Baggott, the former chief constable of Leicestershire who was the successful candidate.

Gamble stated that he believed his background as an RUC Special Branch officer may have been a factor in why he was not selected for the role and that his RUC background may have been "unhelpful and perhaps unhealthy for the service".

=== National Criminal Intelligence Service ===
Gamble led the National Criminal Intelligence Service (NCIS) fight against child sex abuse. He also presided over Operation Ore. He led the work to set up the National Crime Squad's specialist response cell – the Paedophile and Online Investigation Team (POLIT). He was awarded the Queen's Police Medal (QPM) in the 2008 New Year Honours.

Gamble was a co-author on the UK's first Domestic Homicide Review (Pemberton) and in 2010 was appointed by the then Home Secretary to lead the initial scoping review of the investigation into the disappearance of Madeleine McCann.

Gamble resigned as CEO of CEOP in October 2010. He then created the 'INEQE Safeguarding Group'.

Gamble has been called to give evidence at the Independent Inquiry into Child Sex Abuse (IICSA) on two occasions. The first related to child abuse on the internet, and the second to faith-based institutions.

== Labour Party membership ==
In 2015, Gamble joined the Labour Party in Northern Ireland. Gamble stated that he wanted Labour candidates to be allowed to stand in Northern Ireland, but that he would have no plans to run himself. Later that year, Gamble voted for Yvette Cooper during the Labour Party leadership election.

== See also ==
- Internet Watch Foundation
- Police Service of Northern Ireland
- ThinkUKnow
- Virtual Global Taskforce
