= Australian High Tech Crime Centre =

Australian-wide policing initiative

The Australian High Tech Crime Centre (AHTCC) are hosted by the Australian Federal Police (AFP) at their headquarters in Canberra. Under the auspices of the AFP, the AHTCC is party to the formal Joint Operating Arrangement established between the AFP, the Australian Security Intelligence Organisation and the Computer Network Vulnerability Team of the Australian Signals Directorate.

The AHTCC is an Australian-wide policing initiative to coordinate the efforts of Australian law enforcement in combating serious, complex and multi-jurisdictional Internet-based crimes, particularly those beyond the capability of individual police agencies in Australia. Other roles include protecting the information infrastructure of Australia, and providing information to other law enforcement to help combat online crime.

Technological advancements, and greater internet accessibility, has seen a growth in cyber criminality. The Australian Federal Police have established the Australian High Tech Crime Centre to prevent such crimes from occurring in the digital space. State and community police work in corporation with the AFP to combat cyber crime.

== Overview ==
Technology and its advancements, including greater and broader internet accessibility, have boosted cybercrime. The AFP established the AHTCC to cease and prevent online fraudulent behaviour. State and community police work incorporation with the AFP to combat digital crime.

AHTCC was established in July 2003, to investigate online fraudulent matters and is currently directed by Kevin Zuccato. The AHTCC, today, continues to fight against cybercrime. Commonwealth Laws outline the Cybercrime regulations in Australia.

Cybercrime is defined by the AFP as “crimes directed at computers or other information communications technologies (ICTs) (such as computer intrusions and denial of service attacks), and crimes where computers or ICTs are an integral part of an offence (such as online fraud)”.

Digital attacks are often conducted by cyber adversaries, who are individuals or groups of people that specialize in conducting cyberattacks, online crime and malicious activity. Their activities destroy online businesses and networks and can compromise public or private data.

Malicious cyber activity is a risk for organisations and governments, including but not limited to, businesses that hold public data. In 1991, the World-wide-web was developed and shared. This allowed crime to occur through the internet, as well as offline. Online interactions and user relationships have heightened the ability of cybercrime to manifest and spread.

AHTCC's main role is to ‘discover levels of online criminal activity’ and to undertake necessary measures to prevent or combat digital crime (Platypus, 2009, p. 7). AHTCC has partnered with large corporations, and work's alongside Australia's policing system to effectively manage web-based criminal schemes. The AFP conduct initiatives, like publishing reports that detail how the public should prevent cybercrime. These reports educate businesses on the possible threats of online transactions, customer communications, and other digital tools. The AHTCC's website has a section for victims of digital offences to report and request help from the federal police.

Notably, AHTCC has mitigated online criminality and effectively maintained a high level of mediation for cybercrime prevention. The AHTCC deals with different groups of cybercrime including but not limited to, hackers, viruses, scammers, identity thieves, and online terrorists. In 2008, the AFP launched the High Tech Crimes Operations (HTCO) to investigate Child sex crimes and digital acts of child exploitation. The exploitation of children online continues to be an issue globally.

The AFP has several organisations that deal with online criminality. The Australian Cyber Security Centre (ACSC), which is operated by the Australian Government, specialises in digital safety and security and works closely with the AHTCC to fight cybercrime. The ACSC allows the public and private to join forces to resolving cyber threats and possible attacks. The AFP also work with Defense Signals Directorate (DSD) and the Australian Security Intelligence Organization (ASIO) to effectively manage cyber-attacks that would harm Australia's business environment and public sphere.

== History ==
The AHTCC was established in 2003, as a response to the rapid rise in digital usage and technological capabilities. The growth in Internet potential provided new capacities for criminals to engage in online fraudulent activities. Cybercrime has been existent since 1978 when the internet was first established and dispersed. Security systems have realised the need for continuous data moderation, and the monitoring of user activity online and offline. With the rise of e-commerce transactions a ‘dark’ web/ ‘black market’ has emerged and targets users of internet.

In 2003, at the beginning of the AHTCC, the centre had a budget of $4 million per annum and was operated by 13 staff, currently, the AFP has 258 staff working in technology and innovation and 319 in the security sector, with a total of 6695 staff across the board.

The AHTCC and the AFP have adapted their work in line with the rise in web use. In 1991, the police were able to make video and audio records of interviews, as a new wave of digital records emerged. To this day, the AFP is extremely present online, focusing on detecting criminals before they know they have been detected (AFP, 2020). Cybercrime prevention is an expensive exercise for the AFP. As of 2013, there were an estimated 10 billion devices connected to the internet, and with this increasing digital usage, comes more targeted attacks and criminal possibilities. The security software company, Symantec Corporation, estimates that, in 2010, cybercrime cost US$388 billion in losses, globally. (Weber, 2014, p. 54).

The Cybercrime Act was introduced by the Australian Government in 2001, outlining online offences prohibited. Statistically, cybercrime is significantly impacting Australians. In 2015, 1 in 4 Australians reported being victims of Identity theft (Veda Report, 2015). In 2015, Australia had a significant data breach from overseas, an Australian Insurance company was the target of a cyberattack, in which criminals gained access to prohibited government systems and compromised the finances of notable businesses, damaging Australia's security systems. The AFP solved this. The AFP is working closely with Australians to avoid cybercrime. “Veda’s research from 2015 found that 95% of Australians were taking some kind of active precaution to protect their identity” (Veda Report, 2015).

== Australia's Approach ==
Australia follows the Commonwealth cybercrime regime, a legislative system that formed the CyberCrime Act 2011, an Act that considered computer crimes, traditional offline offences committed online, digital data misuse and other internet criminality. This Act has been amended, in 2012 it was changed to the Cybercrime Amendment Act, expanding its definition of cyber offences, as the online criminal possibilities broadened.

However, the current cybercrime policies in Australia, do not acknowledge ‘computer fraud’ as a criminal offence under the commonwealth law. ‘Given the borderless nature of cybercrime, it is an oversight to not have a national approach to computer related fraud’ (Weber, p. 68).

== Roles and Functions ==
Cybercrime takes numerous forms, including identity theft, digital scams, hacking, online fraud, and phishing. It is the role of the AHTCC in conjunction with the AFP and several other government corporations, to prevent and reduce criminal behaviour online.

The AFP is in a partnership with the Virtual Global Taskforce (VGT), which includes major countries and organisations, who join forces in combating cybercrime. Globally, they tackle international digital offences. Cybercrime is not just personal account hacking, but can involve breaching security of government cooperation's and networks, having a broader national impact.

The Australian Government established The Australian Cybercrime Online Reporting Network (ACORN) to allow victims of cybercrime to report the occurrences and likewise for organisations. In 2015, ACORN recorded 39, 491 cybercrime incidents, and similarly, "Australian Federal Police (AFP) Commander David McLean reported that, in one month alone, over 3,500 people had contacted police about perceived cyber-crime" (Broadhurst, 2017).

There is widespread dissemination of pornographic content on the internet. User anonymity is used to conduct this behaviour, as tracing the criminal behind the crime is difficult. Some estimates suggest that 20,000 images of child porn are posted online each week (Broadhurst, 2017). Importantly, the AHTCC is taking effect against child abuse material, which has continued to circulate on the internet. The Australian police are focusing closely on child predators, targeting criminals that are a threat to society, to keep the online community safe and free from malicious and dangerous offences. Users who access and choose to view illegal content online are considered in the eyes of the Australian Law, as guilty as those who publish the footage, and thus are not free from prosecution themselves. Educating the public on these offences is part of the Australian Government security initiatives.

Technologies are helping the AFP combat cybercrime. In April 2016, The Australian Prime Minister allocated resources and financial expenditure of A$230 million to fund cybercrime and security measures under the AHTCC operations. Funding is important for the safety of businesses and individuals.

== Notable Cases ==
The Australian Federal Police established the AHTCC to effectively control and manage cybercrime. The AFP has thus far, been successful in this field. According to the AFP, ‘over the past two years, more than 300 Australians have been arrested and charged in relation to the online sexual exploitation of children’ and concurrently, children posed as a risk to criminals were freed from danger and educated (AFP, 2020). A large part of cybercrime is Pedophilia. Organisations of International pedophiles use digital devices and platforms to exploit children, through strategies like webcams and online mechanisms like anonymity.

The AFP's budget is extensive, to cover a vast number of cybercrime cases and solutions. In 2014, An online Russian crime syndicate hacked Australian companies and accessed 500,000 Australian's financial details. The AHTCC arrested members of the gang, with seven criminals being in Victoria and thirteen in Spain. The AHTCC was responsible for combating this fraudulent activity effectively, avoiding the major crime from damaging the Australian economy and the broader national impact. The AHTCC is capable of managing domestic and international cybercrime and will work alongside large nations to develop plans of combat.

Recently, the AHTCC was highly successful in a case known as ‘Operation Carpo’, whereby a Western Australian man was prosecuted for withholding 56,000 credit card details, 53,000 usernames and passwords and 110,000 domain names. The success of this case, prevented several other organised cybercrime's in Australia (AFP).

== The Future ==
Australia is facing an increase in cyber criminality because of new technologies that can be defeated and maliciously targeted. The Australian Government continues to develop and improve its digital infrastructure and security, but loopholes are discovered by crime groups. In Australia, there is wealth and a high use of digital devices, which attracts criminality to our organisations and businesses. Further, there is a lack of information reported about cybercrime, which proposes difficulty for government bodies, like the AHTCC, to investigate and resolve the problem.

As technology continues to dominate the marketplace, the AHTCC will be vitally needed. The AFP will always require investigatory teams, such as the AHTCC to mitigate cyber criminality. The AFP declare that “Our ongoing commitment is to stay at least one step ahead of the criminals who are involved in any form of online crime” (AFP, 2020).

The Government, in 2016, introduced the Cyber Security Strategy, worth more than $230 million, to improve and maintain nation-wide digital security. One of the initiatives of this program was to increase the number of cyber security workers, and equip more professionals with the necessary tools and skills to uphold these qualifications. Institutions were set up to offer cybersecurity courses, and to ensure Australia remains at the front line with digital crime and technological advancements.

The director of AHTCC, Kevin Zuccato, works nationally with other countries to establish cyber-security on a global scale. The AHTCC is part of the Strategic Alliance Cyber Crime Working Group, which focuses on transnational cybercrime and building strong global relationships between countries and governments to combat world-wide cyber-attacks together.

The Australian Government has also implemented numerous measures and strategies to prevent cybercrime, including, but not limited to, risk reduction protocols, multi-stakeholder approaches to internet governing, internet neutrality, supporting human rights online, improve connectivity, technology innovation and digital-ready workforces.

All cyber defenders must work closely together to minimise cyber criminality. To do so, Australians and their businesses must report any security breached incidents to the Australian Federal Police, who will provide advice and assistance in preventing such crimes from occurring in the future. Further, the AFP requires the reporting of cybercrime offences as it provides needed information in order to seize all criminal behaviour online.

== See also ==
- Crime in Australia
- Law enforcement in Australia
- Australian Federal Police
- Australian Government
- Virtual Global Taskforce
- Australian Cyber Security Centre
- Australian Security Intelligence Organisation
