= VGT =

VGT may refer to:

- Flemish Sign Language (Vlaamse Gebarentaal), the language used by signers in Flanders
- North Las Vegas Airport (IATA code: VGT), an airport located three nautical miles (6 km) NW of the central business district of Las Vegas
- Variable-geometry turbocharger, a family of turbochargers usually designed with variable aspect ratios
- Video Gaming Technologies, an American supplier of gambling machines
- Virtual Global Taskforce, a group of law enforcement agencies from around the world working together to fight child pornography online
- Vision Gran Turismo, a series of concept cars created by automakers for the Gran Turismo video game series
