= Kennedy Nolan =

Australian architectural firm

Practice information
- Founders: Patrick Kennedy and Rachel Nolan
- Founded: 1999
- No. of employees: 23
- Location: Melbourne, Australia

Significant works and honors
- Buildings: James Street House, Merricks Beach House, Westgarth House
- Projects: Nightingale Leftfield
- Awards: Melbourne Prize 2023, Frederick Romberg Award 2021 and multiple Victoria Chapter AIA Awards in New Residential, Alterations and Additions and Multi Residential categories

Website
- https://www.kennedynolan.com.au/

Kennedy Nolan is a Melbourne-based architecture practice established in 1999 by Rachel Nolan and Patrick Kennedy (who both met while studying and living on campus at the University of Melbourne). Kennedy Nolan principally work on residential projects, but their folio expands to include educational, retail and hospitality projects. Despite the increasing scale of their work, they retain a domestic intimacy to their buildings.

== Design ==
The form of architectural detail is a preoccupation of Kennedy Nolan. An example of this approach is witnessed at the Laver House where an "oversized timber cruciform column" is overblown in scale to conceal the corridor behind. This playfulness with details salutes Ludwig Mies van der Rohe, an architectural hero of Kennedy Nolan, who stated "God is in the details." Not only details but architectural fundamentals such as stairs and walls undergo examination with Kennedy Nolan. Architectural historian Philip Goad stated that: "What sets Kennedy Nolan apart from other practices in Melbourne is their investigation into the art of the wall. While the work of Mies is a referent, it [for Kennedy Nolan] is only a ghost of one."

== Influences ==
Kennedy Nolan cite Brutalist architecture and the Arts and Crafts movement as being influential upon their work, as they admire the "cultural sensitivity of the arts and crafts with the social optimism and technical empowerment of modernism." Modernist projects such as The Barbican Estate by Chamberlin, Powell and Bon, Clyde Cameron College by Architects Group's Kevin Borland and Bernard Brown, and Marcel Breuer's Hooper House II and House Pack have been influential on the practice.

== Notable works ==
=== Leahy Swingler House, James Street ===
Kennedy Nolan's first project Leahy Swingler House was the renovation of a dilapidated Edwardian House in Melbourne's inner north. Kennedy Nolan's attention to the abstract form of architectural fundamentals is evident on the street elevation with an over-scaled chamfered chimney that accentuates the building's street presence. The commission was the catalyst for Rachel Nolan and Patrick Kennedy to begin their office. It received a Victorian chapter Australian Institute of Architects award for alterations and additions in 2001.

=== George Street ===
In 2004 Kennedy Nolan redeveloped an old factory site in Fitzroy into three-townhouses, each on approximately 85 square meters of land. The new three-story complex incorporates a single-story 1970s brick warehouse, which enabled the project to have zero setback from the adjacent property. Appearing as an abstract hybrid of house and factory, Patrick Kennedy states that this project "was our first chance to make the form in the public realm."

== Awards ==
- 2001 AIA, Victorian Architecture Award: Residential Alterations & Additions
- 2004 AIA Victorian Architecture Award: Multi-residential
- 2007 AIA Victorian Architecture Award: Residential Alterations & Additions
- 2013 AIA Victorian Architecture Award: Residential New
- 2014 AIA Victorian Architecture Award: Residential Alterations & Additions
- 2014 AIA Victorian Architecture Award: Residential Alterations & Additions
- 2014 Interior Design Excellence Awards (IDEA): Winner, Overall
- 2019 AIA Victorian Architecture Award: Residential New, Sandy Point House
- 2019 AIA Victorian Architecture Commendation: Residential New, Fitzroy Lane
- 2021 AIA Frederick Romberg Award for Residential Architecture, Multiple Housing: The Lothian
- 2023 AIA Melbourne Prize: Nightingale Village
