= Operation Auxin =

- Operation name: Operation Auxin
- Type: Child pornography crackdown

Participants
- Planned by: United States
- Executed by: Australia, Canada, Germany, Ireland, Italy, Switzerland, United Kingdom, United States

Mission
- Target: Associated users associated with website portal Landslide Productions.
- Objective: To round up and prosecute suspects named in a Tip by the United States FBI from Operation Avalanche

Results
- Arrests: ~200

Operation Auxin was an Australian Federal Police operation in September 2004, leading to the arrest of almost 200 people on charges of child pornography. The individuals charged were accused of purchasing child pornography over the Internet from Belarusian crime syndicates. The credit card payments connected to the illicit purchases had been processed by a company named Landslide.com in Fort Lauderdale, Florida. Among the accused were people holding positions of trust in the community, such as police officers (including one officer assigned to investigate child pornography), members of the military, teachers, and ministers of religion. Several of the suspects committed suicide. It was the follow-up to the U.S. FBI operation Operation Avalanche, and has been associated with Operation FALCON.

== US investigation ==
Between 1999 and 2001, after a tip, a US investigation was conducted into Landslide Productions Inc., a Texas-based online pornography portal operated by Thomas and Janice Reedy. The portal was found to have provided access to child pornography, and the Reedys were both convicted of trafficking child pornography in August 2001.

Following the investigation and conviction, "Operation Avalanche" was launched in the US to trace and prosecute child pornography users identified in the Landslide database. In addition, the website was run for a short time as part of a sting operation by the FBI to capture new suspects. The FBI also passed identities from the Landslide database to the police organisations of other countries, including 7,272 names to the UK.

== Legality ==
=== Legal challenges ===
The initial credit card evidence used in the investigation has since been widely debunked due to the fact that there was no established link between a credit card being used and actual pornography being downloaded. Additionally, multiple cases of credit card fraud involving organised crime syndicates have also raised the possibility that credit card numbers retrieved from Landslide.com may have been used by a third party and not their owners at all.

Similarly, Operation Ore in the United Kingdom has come under intense fire, both from those wrongfully convicted and from civil rights groups.

== Results ==
Nearly 200 people arrested in Australia

=== Country-specific results ===
- Australia 200 arrests (see Operation Auxin)
- Canada (see Operation Snowball)
- Ireland (see Operation Amethyst)
- Italy (see Operation Pecunia)
- Switzerland (see Operation Genesis aka Action Genesis)
- United Kingdom (see Operation Ore)
- United States (see Operation Avalanche)

== Participating countries ==
- Australia - Australian Federal Police (AFP)
- United Kingdom - National Crime Agency (NCA)
- United States - Federal Bureau of Investigation (FBI)
