= Robin Gibson Award for Enduring Architecture =

Annual award for significant buildings in Queensland, Australia

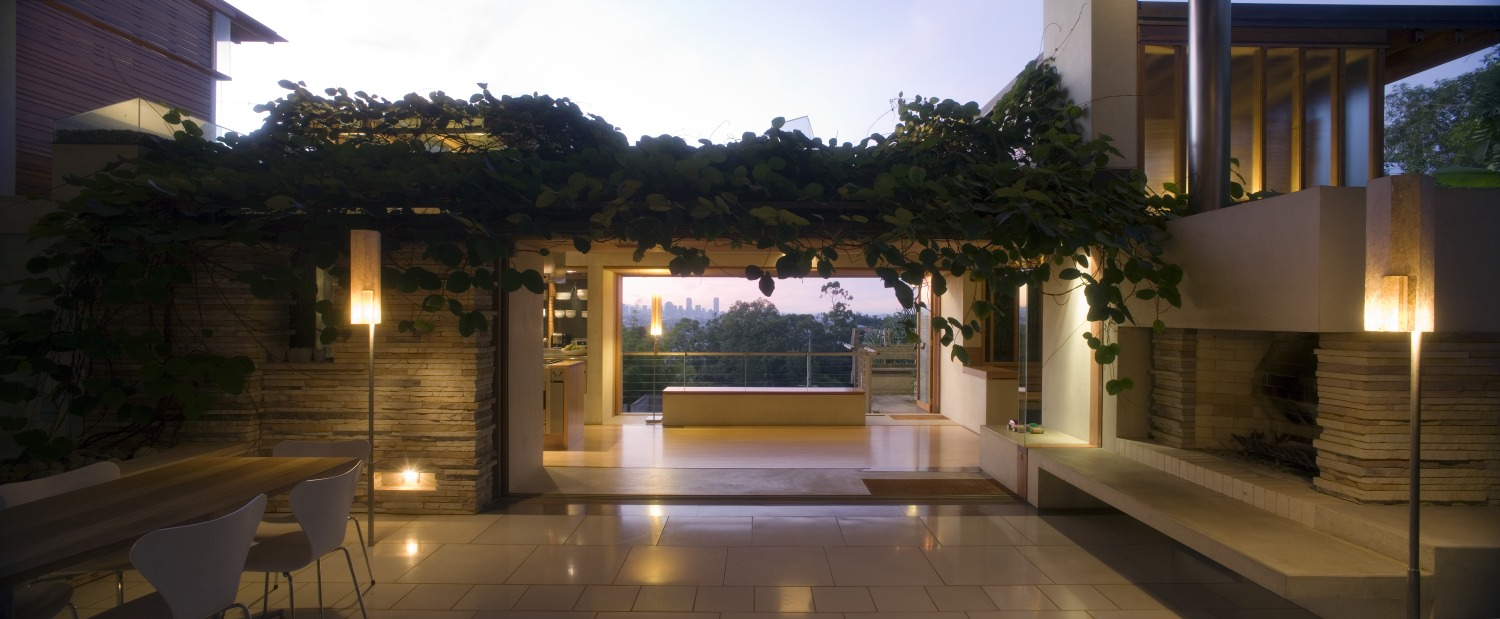
- C House, 2024 Award
- Awarded for: Outstanding Queensland architecture (25 years or older)
- Country: Australia
- Presented by: Australian Institute of Architects (Queensland Chapter)
- First award: 2003; 23 years ago
- Currently held by: Lawrence Nield and Partners Australia with John Mainwaring and Associates, 2026

The Robin Gibson Award for Enduring Architecture is an architecture prize presented annually by the Queensland Chapter of the Australian Institute of Architects (AIA) since the inaugural award in 2003. The award recognises significant, long lasting and innovative architecture with usually more than 25 years passed since the completion of construction.

== Background ==
The Enduring Architecture Award recognises achievement for the design of buildings of outstanding merit, which have remained important as high quality works of architecture when considered in contemporary cultural, social, economic and environmental contexts in the state of Queensland. Nominations for the award can be made by AIA members, non–members and non–architects, but must provide adequate material and information supporting the nomination for consideration of the jury. The award was initially known as the 25 Year Award from 2003 to 2010, later changed to the Queensland Award for Enduring Architecture from 2011 to 2013 in line with other states and the national awards. In 2014 it became a named award recognising Queensland architect, Robin Gibson AO, a two timer winner of the award.

The average age of the 26 projects recognised to from 2003 to 2026 is 37.2 years from completion of construction to year of award.

== National Award Winners ==
Recipients of the state–based award are eligible for consideration for the National Award for Enduring Architecture presented later in the same year, as part of the Australian National Architecture Awards.

As of 2024 two projects located in Queensland have won the national award. In 2018 the Townsville Courts of Law, Edmund Sheppard Building by Hall, Phillips and Wilson Architects won both the state and national award 43 years after the building was completed in 1975. In 2024 the C House by Donovan Hill was presented the national award.

== Multiple Award Winners ==
Projects by architects Geoffery Pie, Robin Gibson and James Birrell have all been presented the award on two occasions each.

== Awards by year ==
=== 2023 Award ===
The Robin Gibson Award for Enduring Architecture was awarded to the Sir Kingsford Smith Memorial by Noel Robinson Architects located at Brisbane Airport and completed in 1988. The 35-year-old building houses the plane that was flown by Sir Kingsford Smith and his crew across the Pacific from San Francisco to Brisbane's Eagle Farm in 1928. The jury declared the project “an exemplary piece of public architecture that protects an important part of Australian history”.

=== 2024 Award ===
The 2024 Award was presented to the C House by Donovan Hill, commissioned in 1992 and completed in 1998. The residential house is located in Coorparoo, Brisbane. In October 2024, the C House was awarded the National Award for Enduring Architecture, with the jury citation describing the design as "Internationally recognised as one of the most influential houses of the 20th century, the C House’s impact on architectural discourse and practice cannot be overstated. The C House embodies Donovan Hill’s pioneering exploration of the outdoor room typology, a concept that continues to be redeployed by architects throughout the country...".

== List of Award recipients ==
Robin Gibson Award for Enduring Architecture (reverse order)
Year	Architect	Project	Location	Year built	Years since	Other AIA Awards
2026	Lawrence Nield and Partners Australia with John Mainwaring and Associates	University of the Sunshine Coast Library (Paul Thomas Library)	90 Sippy Downs Drive, Sippy Downs, Sunshine Coast	1996	30 years	Sir Zelman Cowen Award for Public Architecture, 1997; BHP Colorbond Award, 1997; FDG Stanley Award for Public Buildings, 1997 (Qld); Regional Commendation, 1997 (Qld)
2025	Goodsir Baker Wilde	Bethany Home for the Aged	75 Ward Street, The Range, Rockhampton	1978	47 years	
2024	Donovan Hill	C House	Coorparoo, Brisbane	1992—1998	26 years	National Award for Enduring Architecture, 2024
2023	Noel Robinson Architects	Sir Charles Kingsford Smith Memorial	Nancy Bird Way and Airport Drive, Brisbane Airport	1988	35 years	
2022	Australian Construction Services in association with Peddle Thorp Architects	Harry Gibbs Commonwealth Law Courts	119 North Quay, Brisbane	1993	29 years	FDG Stanley Award
2021	Bligh Voller, Parrish O’Neill, Cox Rayner	Church Street Public Housing	Church Street, Fortitude Valley	1995	26 years	Robin Dods Award, 1997
2020	Douglas and Barnes	Holy Family Catholic Church	37 Ward Street, Indooroopilly	1963	57 years	
2019	John Railton Architects	Railton House and Office	63 Grenier Street, Spring Hill, Brisbane	1963	56 years	
2018	Hall, Phillips and Wilson Architects	Townsville Courts of Law Edmund Sheppard Building	31 Walker Street, Townsville	1975	43 years	National Award for Enduring Architecture, 2018
2017	Lund, Hutton, Newell, Black and Paulsen Architects (Architect John Muir Morton)	St Alban's Bush Brotherhood Church (now St Albans Anglican Church)	56 Jane Street, Cunnamulla	1963	54 years	
2016	Conrad Gargett	Good Shepherd Chapel	Bishopsbourne, 39 Eldernell Terrace, Hamilton	1963	53 years	
2015	Dr Karl Langer	Chapel of St Peters Lutheran College Chapel	215 Lambert Road, Indooroopilly	1968	47 years	
2014	Job and Froud Architects	Torbreck Apartments	182 Dornoch Terrace, Highgate Hill	1960	54 years	
2013	Eddie Oribin	Oribin House and Studio	16 Heavey Crescent, Whitfield, Cairns	1958	55 years	
2012	Geoffrey Pie Architects/Planners	Pie Residence	Peregian Beach, Queensland	1986	26 years	Robin Boyd Award, 1986
2011	Harry Seidler and Associates	Riverside Centre	123 Eagle Street, Brisbane	1986	25 years	Sir Zelman Cowen Award for Public Architecture, 1987; Robin Dods Triennial Medal, 1989 (Qld)
2010	Robin Gibson and Partners	QPAC (Queensland Performing Arts Centre)	Melbourne Street and Grey Street, Brisbane	1985	25 years	
2009	Lindsay Clare Mitchell (Kerry Clare, Lindsay Clare and Ian Mitchell)	White House	Fig Tree Pocket, Brisbane	1982	27 years	1982 Queensland House of the Year
2008	John Mainwaring Architects	Banfield Bungalows	18—20 Reid Road, Wongaling Beach	1983	25 years	Queensland Chapter Citation for Meritorious Architecture, 1983
2007	Conwell, Smith & Wilson, Geoffrey Pie	TAB Building	240 Sandgate Road, Albion, Brisbane	1976	31 years	
2006	James Birrell	James Cook University Library Building (now Eddie Koiki Mabo Library since 2008)	Building 18, 1 James Cook Drive, Douglas (Townsville Campus)	1968, 1976 & 1990	38 years	
2005	James Birrell	Agriculture & Entomology Building (Hartley Teakle Building)	University of Queensland, Mill Road, St Lucia	1969	36 years	RAIA Citation, 1970
2004	Robin Gibson and Partners	Queensland Art Gallery	Stanley Place, Brisbane	1982	22 years	Sir Zelman Cowen Award for Public Architecture, 1982
2003	Urs Berger	Golden Gate Resort	3422 Gold Coast Highway, Gold Coast	1977	26 years	

== Gallery of awarded projects ==
Robin Gibson Award for Enduring Architecture
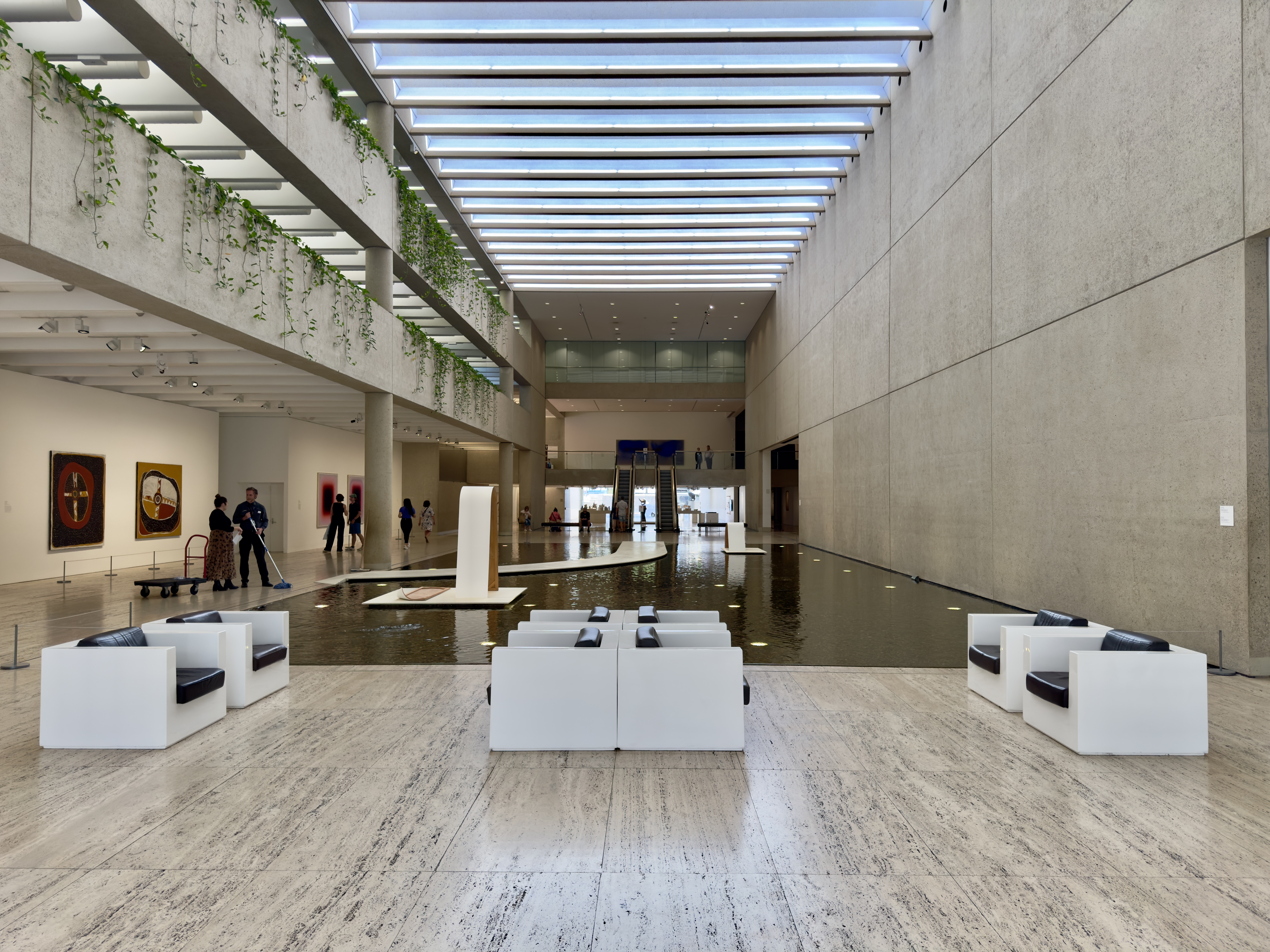
2004 Award, Queensland Art Gallery, Brisbane, Queensland

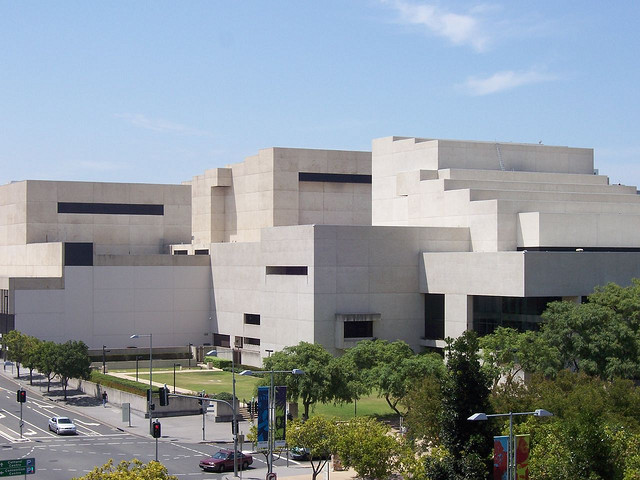
2010 Award, Queensland Performing Arts Centre, Brisbane, Queensland

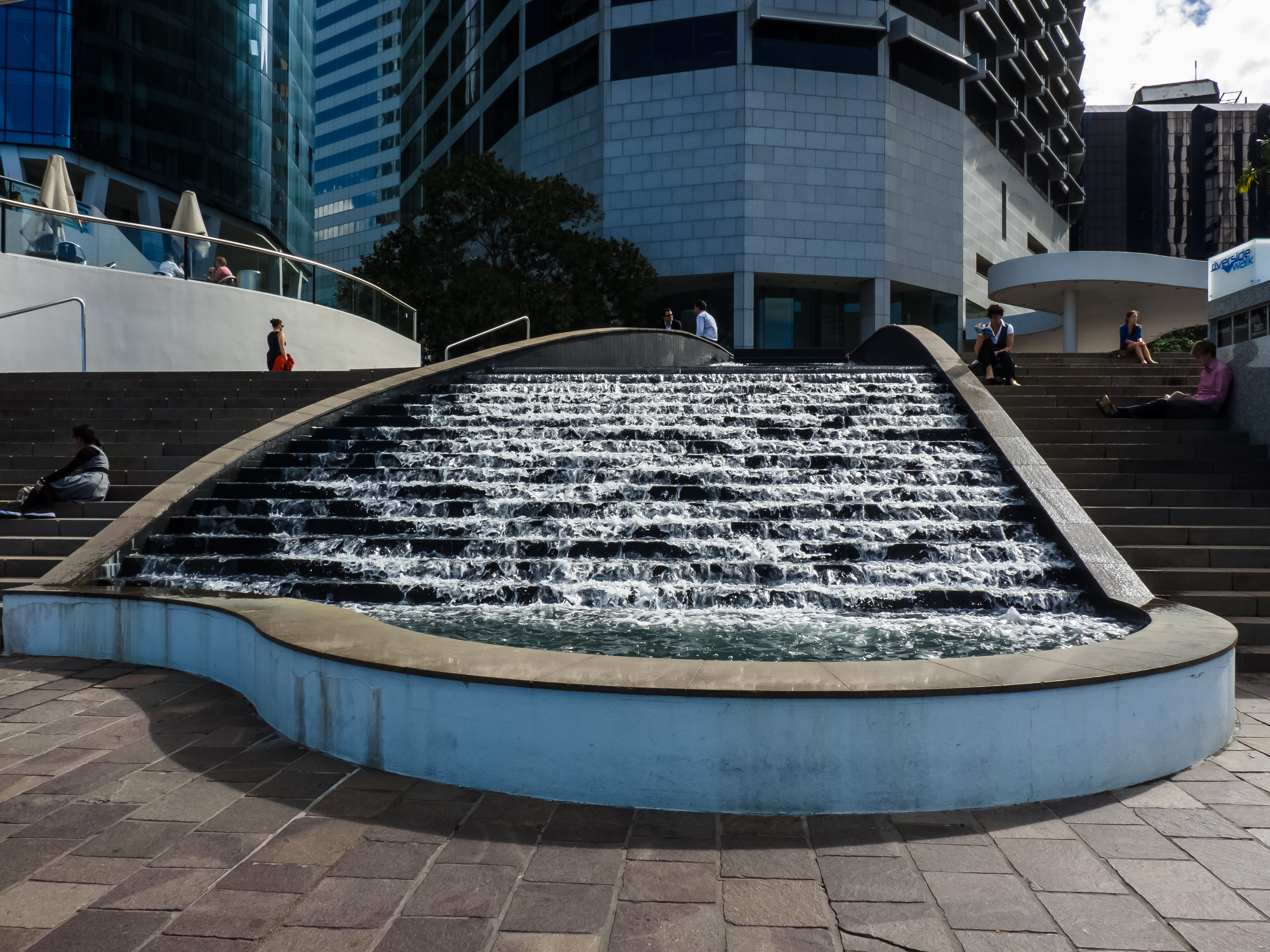
2011 Award, Riverside Centre, Brisbane, Queensland

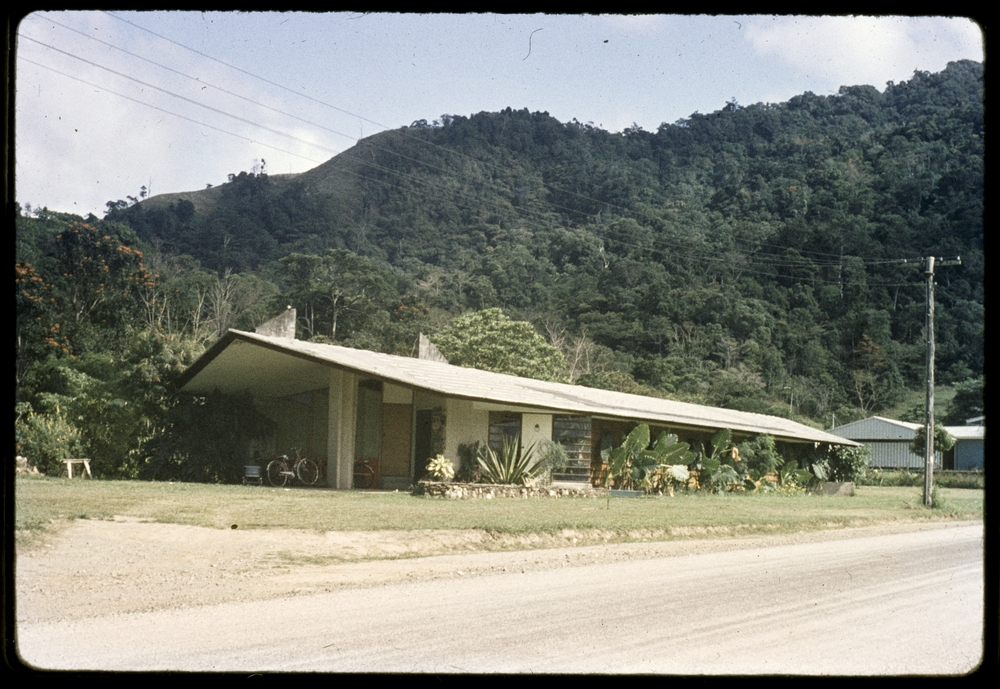
2013 Award, Oribin House, Cairns, Queensland

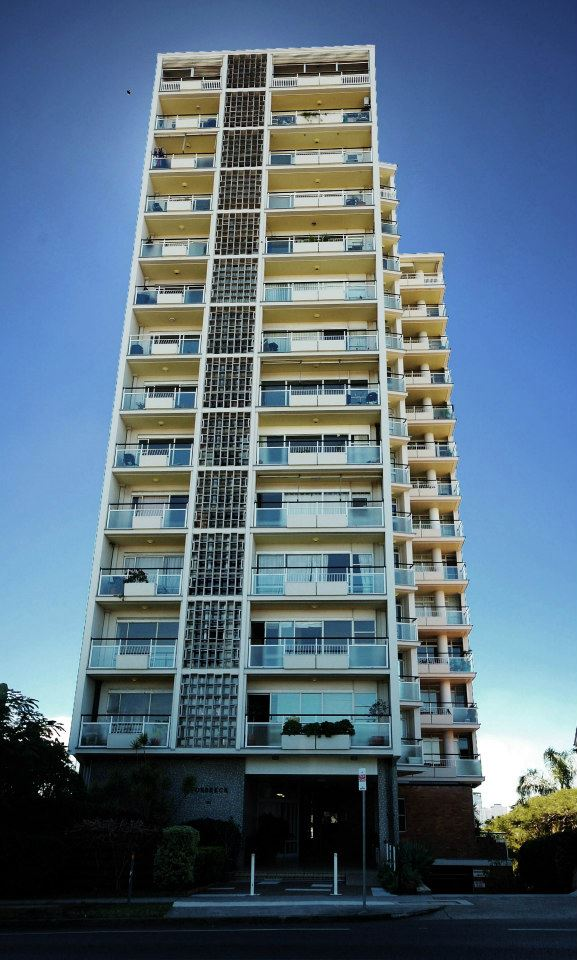
2014 Award, Torbreck Apartments, Brisbane, Queensland

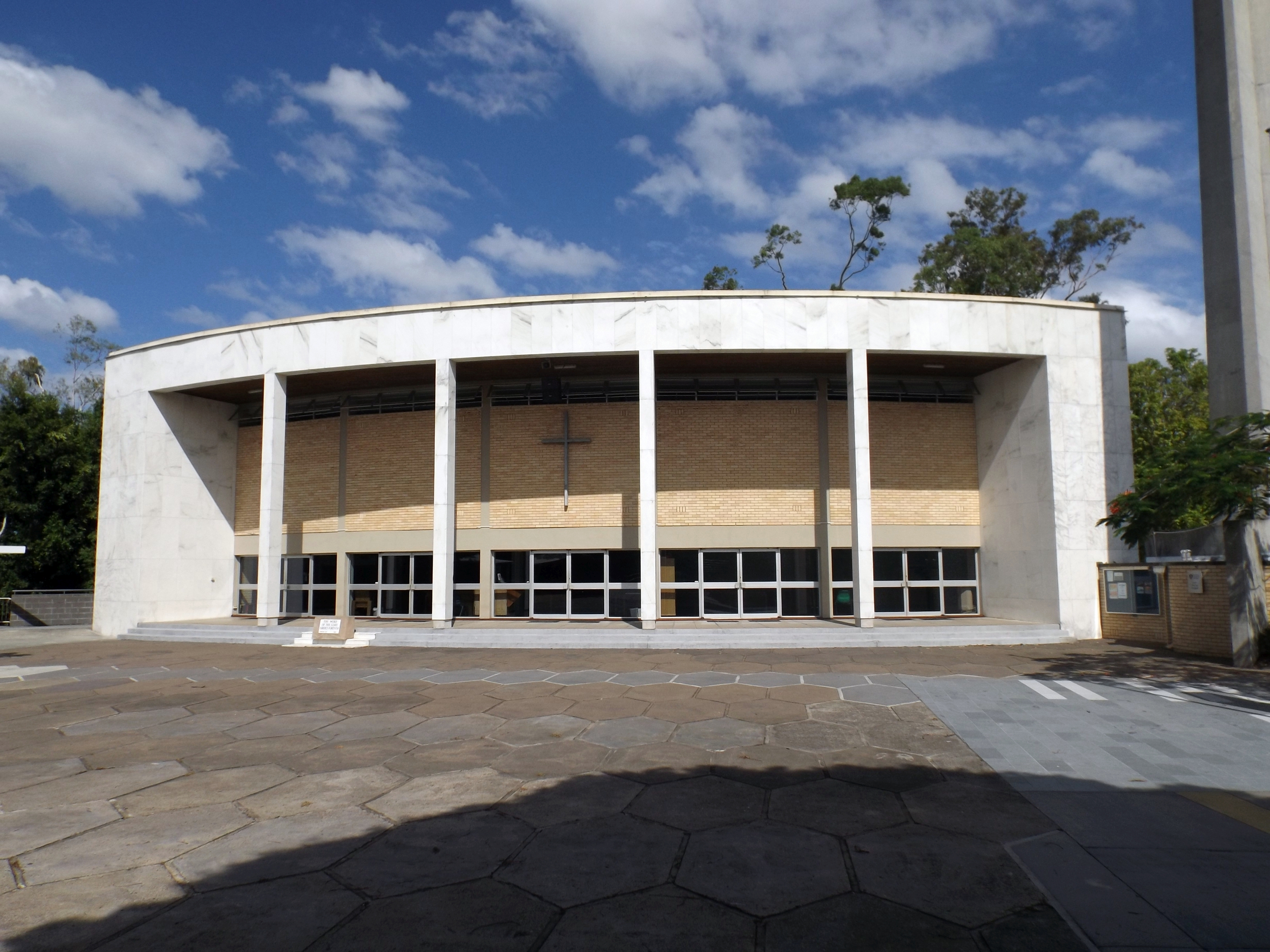
2015 Award, Chapel of St Peters Lutheran College Chapel, Brisbane, Queensland

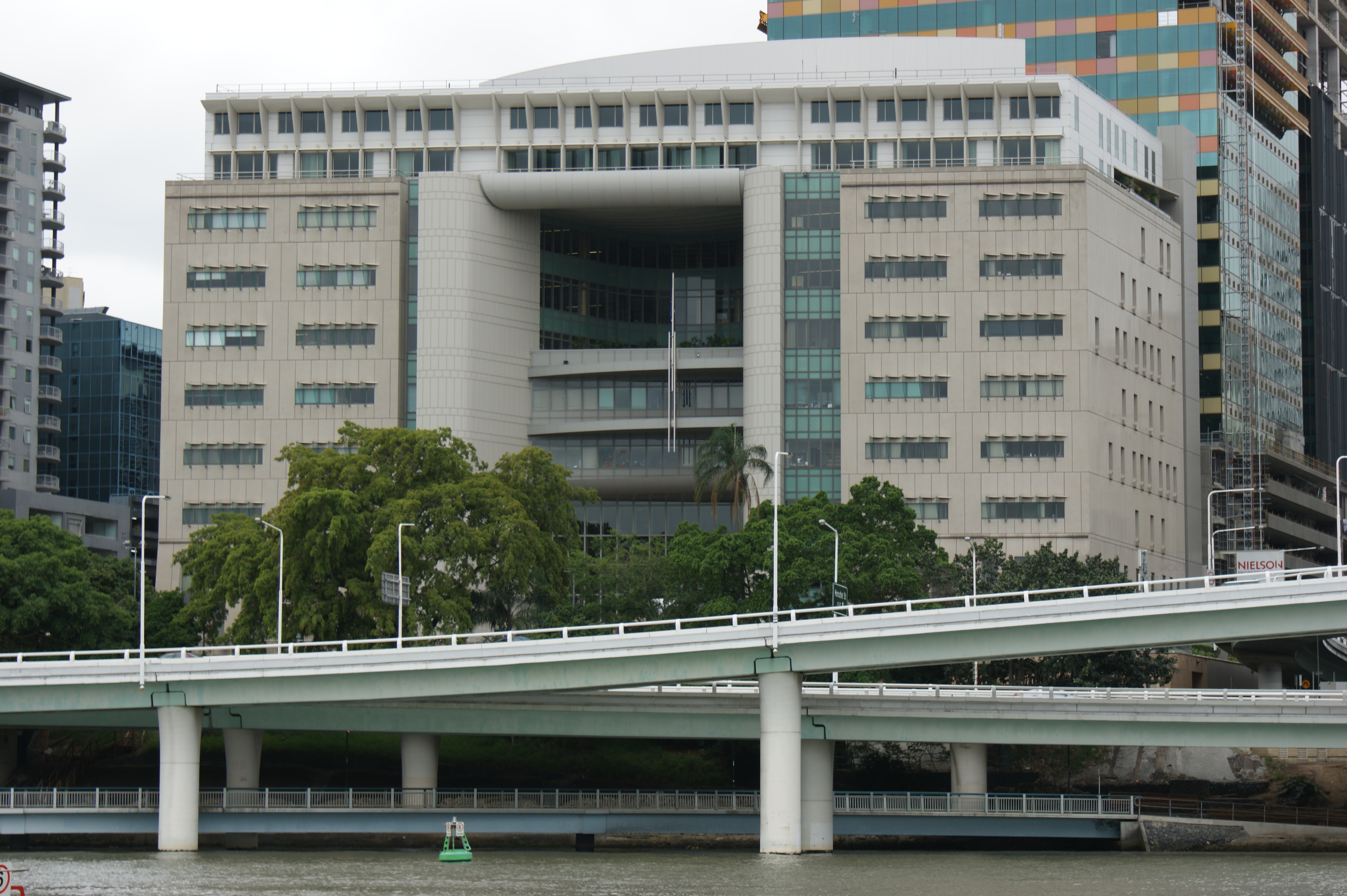
2022 Award, Harry Gibbs Commonwealth Law Courts, Brisbane, Queensland

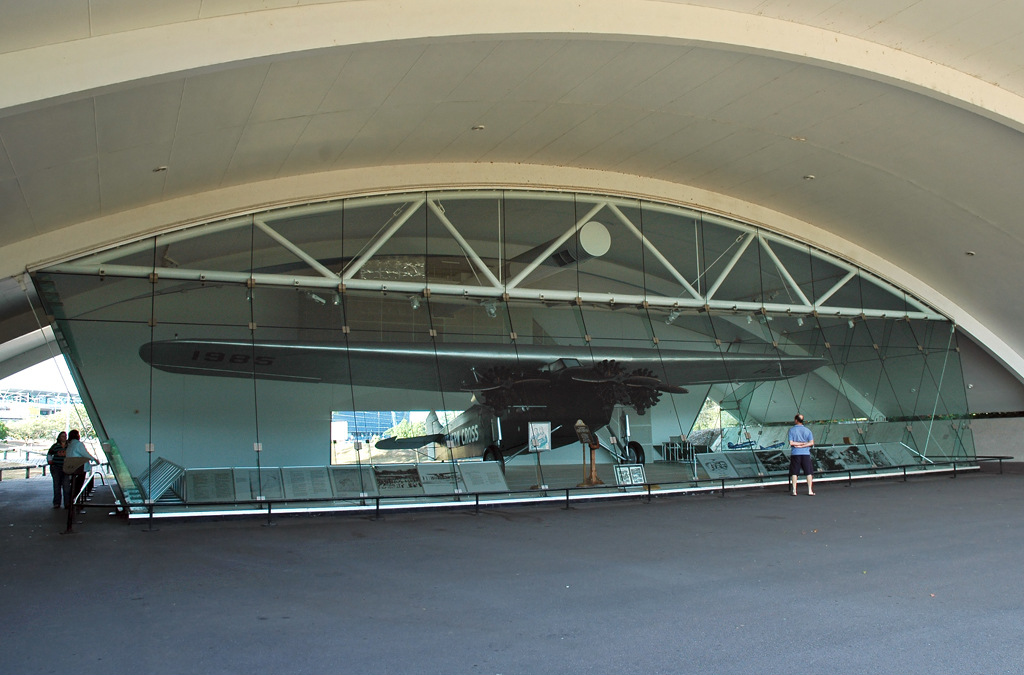
2023 Award, Kingsford Smith Memorial, Brisbane Airport, Queensland

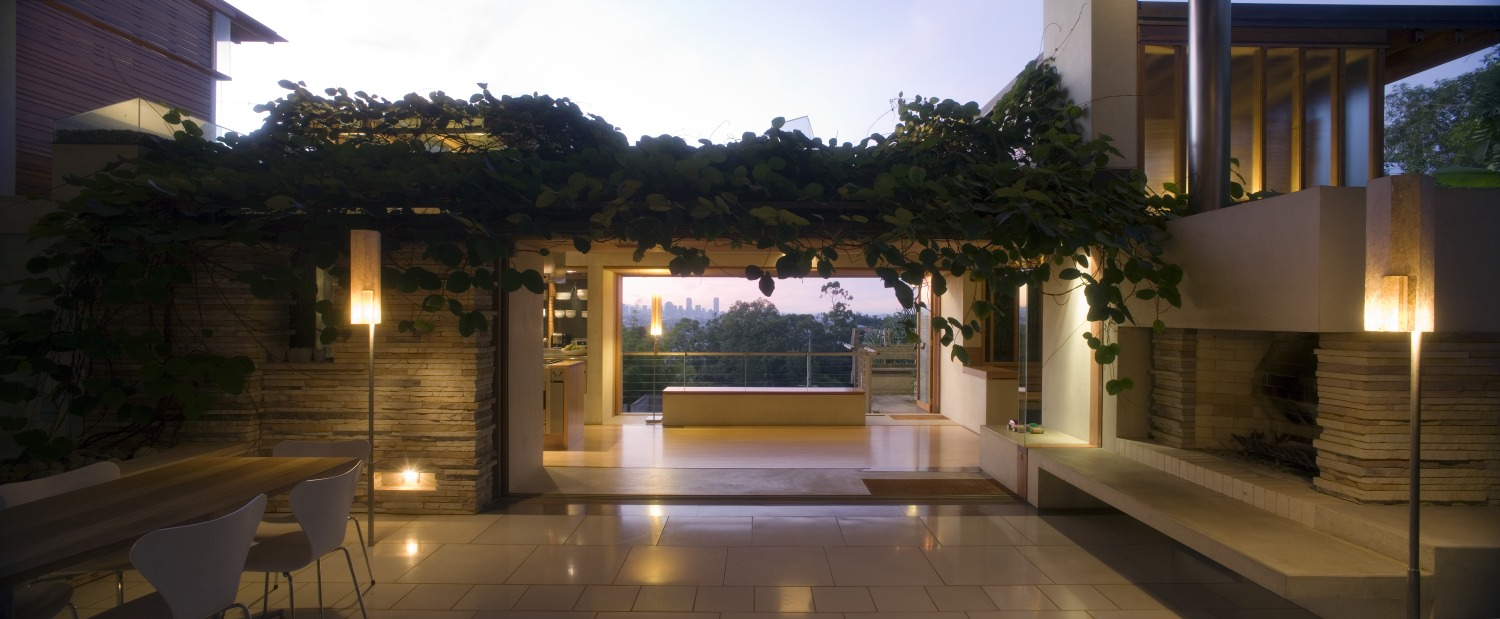
2024 Award, C House, Coorparoo, Queensland

== See also ==
- Australian Institute of Architects Awards and Prizes
- National Award for Enduring Architecture
- Sir Zelman Cowen Award for Public Architecture
- Jack Cheesman Award for Enduring Architecture
- Sir Roy Grounds Award for Enduring Architecture
- New South Wales Enduring Architecture Award
- Maggie Edmond Enduring Architecture Award
