= Donovan Hill =

Australian architecture firm

Practice information
- Founders: Brian Donovan, Timothy Hill
- Founded: 1992
- Dissolved: 2013
- Location: Brisbane, Queensland

Significant works and honors
- Buildings: C House; D House; Z House; Neville Bonner Building; Seaspray Resort
- Projects: State Library of Queensland, 2007
- Awards: Robin Boyd Award, 2001; Robin Dods Award for Residential Housing, 2001 & 2010; Frederick Romberg Award, 2007 & 2010; National Award for Enduring Architecture, 2024; Robin Gibson Award for Enduring Architecture, 2024

Donovan Hill was a Brisbane, Australia, based architecture firm that was founded by Brian Donovan, Timothy Hill in 1992. The firm worked extensively in Brisbane, growing from a workforce of four to 50 within their 17–year existence. Donovan Hill's designs emphasised environmental impact and life cycle. The majority of their commissions were commercial, institutional and civic buildings, and included design concepts relating to interior fit out, landscape and master planning.

In 2012 it was announced that Donovan Hill would merge with BVN Architecture in 2013 to form BVN Donovan Hill, later reverting to BVN in 2014.

== Background ==
Brian Donovan, an independent architect, and Timothy Hill, who was employed by the Brisbane-based firm Lambert Smith, became partners to form Donovan Hill in order to design the C-House in 1992. Donovan had previously worked for the Japanese architect Atsushi Kitagawara, whose emphasis on uniform geometry influenced many Donovan Hill designs.

The firm worked from the verandah of an old property in Kelvin Grove for a lengthy period before moving to Doggett Street, Fortitude Valley. Finally the firm established themselves in the former home of fashion label Eponymous on Bowen Street, Spring Hill.

The firm existed as a separate entity until 2012 when it merged with BVN Architecture, one of Australia's largest Architectural firms. BVN is commonly known for their work on sport facilities for the 2004 Athens Olympic Games, 2008 Beijing Olympic Games and the 2012 London Olympic Games, as well as their work in Australia on Civic, Institutional, office, residential, tourist and urban design projects. When this merger occurred, both Timothy Hill and former director Paul Jones left Donovan Hill, but key staff members such as Brian Donovan, Damien Eckersley and Michael Hogg remained. Donovan Hill were able to bring to BVN a new sense of material as well as a more eco-friendly approach to residential projects.

== Notable residential projects ==
=== C House ===
Built in 1998 for an undisclosed client in Coorparoo, Queensland, the eponymous 'C House' is widely regarded as a landmark project of the pre-merged Donovan Hill practice. Celebrated for its architectural innovation and craftsmanship, the house has received multiple awards, including the National Award for Enduring Architecture and the Robin Gibson Award for Enduring Architecture (Queensland). It is often cited as one of the great Australian houses of the 20th century, and remains a defining work in the firm’s legacy and a testament to their contribution to and innovation of Australian residential architecture.

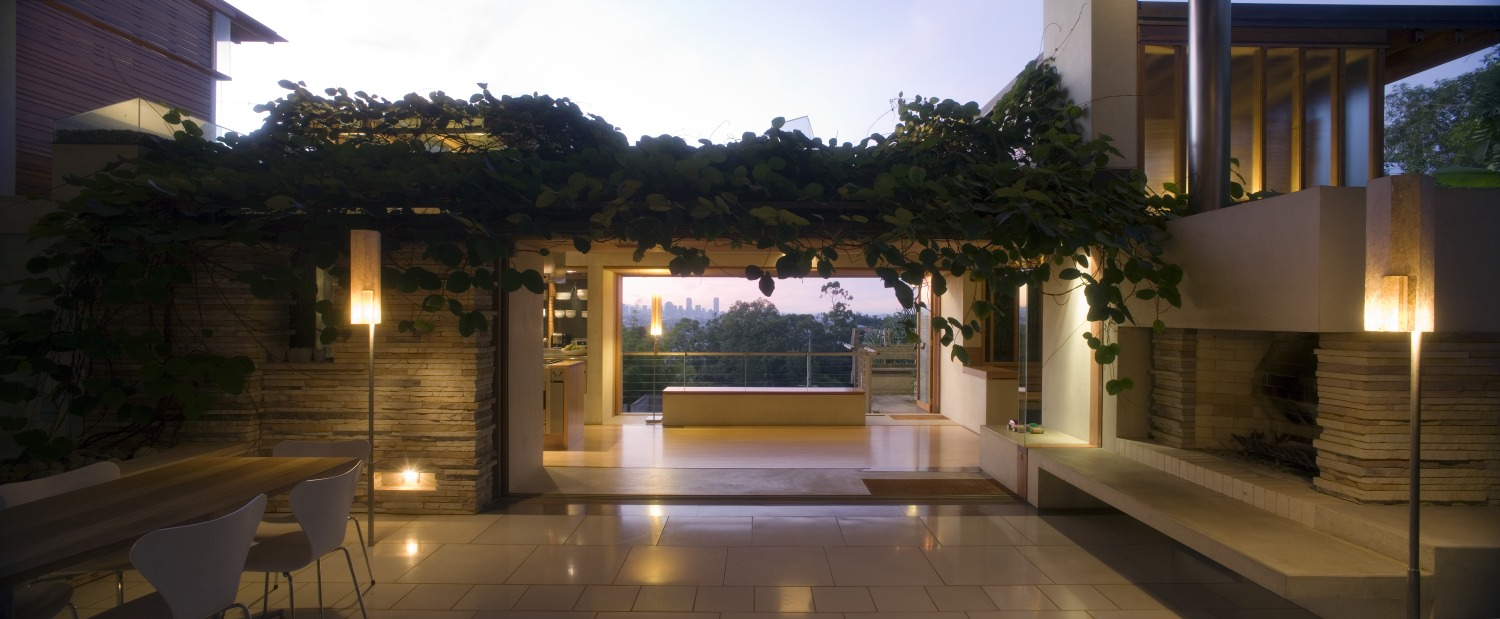
Interior Courtyard of the C House

In describing their conceptual approach to the C House, the architects note that "The site has been refashioned into a series of overlapping sub-suites (both indoor and outdoor), with their interconnection across the climbing topography resembling experiences typical of the terrain." This landscape metaphor informs the design, fostering an everyday experience of occupying the house "as if it were in a landscape." The division into sub-suites inspires a sprawling effect, creating intricate spaces that frame the site's most pleasing views. An undulating floor plan, reflecting the 'typical terrain' of the site, enhances the spatial dimensions and integrates circulation, blending the natural and built environments into a cohesive entity in alignment with Donovan Hill's vision.

A key aspect of C House's design is its approach to future adaptability. From the outset, the architects envisioned an flexible planning scheme to accommodate a variety of future occupants, including a single family, shared singles or couples, an extended family, or even a home office. Essential programmatic elements were arrayed to respond intuitively to the ambiguity of the building's future, allowing for enhancements and expansions to meet changing needs over time. This flexibility ensures the house's lifespan by preserving its usability and relevance without imposing constraints on how it should be occupied. Private rooms are thoughtfully organized around, under, and above a central “public” outdoor room, which serves as a spatial and social focal point. The undulating, terrain-inspired floor plan and sprawling layout further contribute to this flexibility, embedding C-House within Donovan Hill’s broader strategy of designing for indeterminate futures and solidifying its place within the Australian residential typology.

The C House is termed to be the product of Donovan Hill’s ‘redressing’ of international and local distinctions in architecture. They cite Australian domestic architecture as stemming from the wooden Japanese tea-house and pavilion floor plan in conjunction, forming the late modern international style (International Style (architecture)).

=== D House ===
The ‘D House’ built in New Farm, Queensland in 2000 for an unpublished client attempts to address the concept of the urban subdivision’s isolation through its design. It aims to show that individuality can still be obtained thought objective design solutions to re-parameterise the concept of urban living. To address this is a large ‘public’ room that faces and opens to a private, fence-less footpath and then to the streetscape via long window in conjunction with transitional common areas and open terraces.

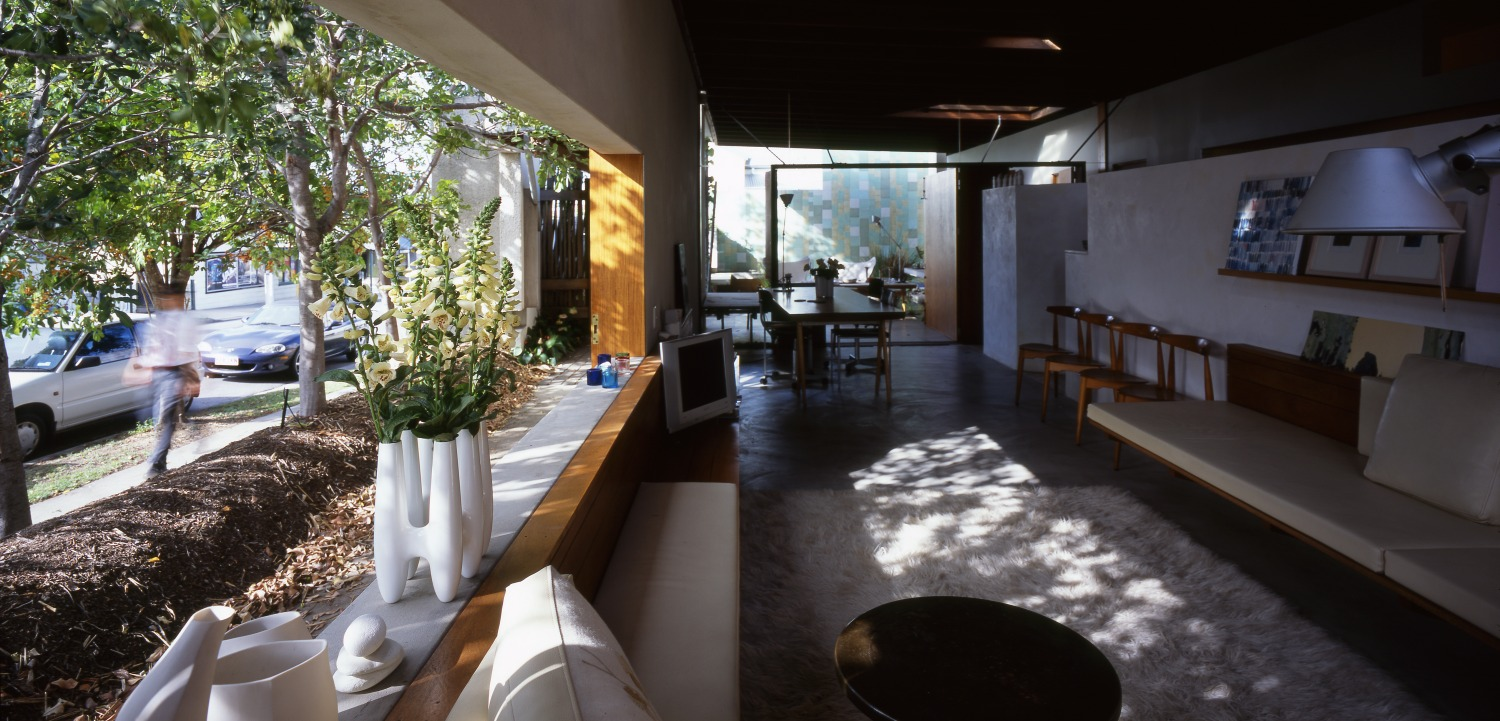
Interior of the D house

Concurrent with some other Donovan Hill Houses is the apparent illusion and subsequent realization of the capacity and program within the building. For example, some mistake the D House for a café due to the large opening from the ‘public’ room – in this way it directly responds to its vernacular (Vernacular architecture) and its design objectives. The design is more concerned with the streetscape and its position relative to add to the public life instead of focusing on picturesque qualities so that people may find it an enriching experience for the public domain.

=== HH House ===
The HH House is among the first substantial built works completed by Donovan Hill Architects. The first stage of renovation diverted pedestrian entry through the underbelly of the raised 'Queenslander' house. A subsequent stage of work remade the front stairs and reestablished a more conventional entry sequence via the original front door. The plan of the building is ordered around a new 17-meter-long room, formed by amalgamating several existing spaces within the original house to create a central volume running from the front to the rear. A flanking courtyard and tall parasol roof catch the north light and draw it into this south-facing room. The design of the building is influenced by Renaissance palazzos and traditional Islamic architecture, which can be seen in the monumental scale of the new pavilion and the spatial planning, which includes intimate seating nooks offering incidental views of the surrounding spaces through curiously placed openings and screened partitions.

=== Z House ===
The Z House is built on the north sloping site of Teneriffe Hill, and is ingrained into its wider context by offering wide views to Moreton Bay. The composition of the weathering materials, detailing of the building and the ventilation openings; exposed to a verdant landscape; is an attempt at depicting a metaphorical ruin. The ventilated openings have replaced windows, and an internal courtyard garden is inserted to enhance the blur of internal and external realms and articulate the illustration of a ruin.

The green courtyard becomes the focal point of the planning of the house with every room branching out from it. The houses internal layout consists of every main room existing on a different floor, all facing into the garden core. The plan results in corridors being negated, an intention to increase the circulation fluidity in order for the house to be read as a scaled down public space. Ultimately there is a cross–ventilation system established in this organisation that utilises breezes from Moreton Bay. In line with their previous works, there was a particular sensibility towards the houses environmental performance and they anchored in this consciousness through optimal building orientation. The house frames external attributes of typical homes and concentrates them into internal experiences with perceived changes through the opening and closing of spaces.

=== Other Notable Projects ===
- AM60
- F2 House
- Ortiga
- Neville Bonner Building (demolished 2017)
- Santos Place
- Seaspray Resort and Spa
- State Library of Queensland
- Tank Bar + Restaurant
- The Happy Haus
- Translational Research Institute in Brisbane (2013)

== Awards ==
=== C House ===
- 2024 National Award for Enduring Architecture
- 2024 Robin Gibson Award for Enduring Architecture

=== D House ===
- 2001 AR+D Awards (UK) for Emerging Architecture ‘High Commendation’
- 2001 Robin Boyd Award for New Residential Housing
- 2001 RAIA State Awards (Queensland) ‘Robin Dods Award for Residential Housing’
- 2001 RAIA State Awards (Queensland) ‘Residential Buildings, Inner Urban House’
- 2001 RAIA Regional Awards (Brisbane) ‘Commendation, Residential Buildings’
- 2001 RAIA Regional Awards (Brisbane) ‘Brisbane House of the Year’

=== Z House ===
- 2010 Robin Dods Award for Residential Architecture, Queensland
- 2011 New House Award (over 200m^{2}), Houses Awards

=== Other Awards ===
- Cornwall Apartments: Frederick Romberg Award, 2007|
- Seaspray Resort and Spa: Frederick Romberg Award, 2010
- Translational Research Institute: FDG Stanley Award for Public Architecture and GHM Addison Award for Interior Architecture, 2013
