= Operation Avalanche (child pornography investigation) =

1999 child pornography investigation

- Operation name: Operation Avalanche
- Type: Child pornography crackdown

Participants
- Planned by: United States
- Executed by: Australia, Canada, Germany, Ireland, Switzerland, United Kingdom, United States

Timeline
- Date begin: 1999
- Date end: ~2002

Results
- Suspects: 144
- Arrests: 100

Operation Avalanche was a major United States investigation of child pornography on the Internet launched in 1999 after the arrest and conviction of Thomas and Janice Reedy, who operated an Internet pornography business called Landslide Productions in Fort Worth, Texas. It was made public in early August 2001, at the end of Operation Avalanche, that 100 arrests were made out of 144 suspects. It was followed by Operation Ore in the United Kingdom, Operation Snowball in Canada, Operation Pecunia in Germany, Operation Amethyst in Ireland, and Operation Genesis in Switzerland.

Although US prosecutions were made on the basis of other evidence, later reconstruction of the Landslide site and review of the computer hard drives in the UK identified flaws in the police forensic procedures used and contradicted evidence on the website given at the Reedys' trial. Specifically, investigation of the Landslide data indicated many names listed were victims of credit card fraud and that there was no link on the Landslide front page to take the user to child pornography sites, as stated in sworn trial testimony.

== Landslide Productions, Inc. ==
Thomas Reedy was a self-taught computer programmer and entrepreneur living in the Fort Worth, Texas, area. He trained and worked as a nurse, but, understanding the financial possibilities of the Internet, he set up an adult pornography website that provided a comfortable income. He soon developed a better strategy to provide middleman services for the adult pornography industry. In 1997, he set up Landslide Productions, Inc., which he ran with his wife Janice, who handled bookkeeping for the company. Landslide quickly became an adult pornography empire stretching across three continents, with some 300,000 subscribers in 60 countries. Within two years, the company made $10 million and provided the owners with a luxurious lifestyle.

Landslide provided payment systems for adult webmasters from different countries. The systems were automated; webmasters could sign up to the system online, and users accessing the websites would go through the payment or login system before being granted access. The principal systems were AVS, for Adult Verification System, and Keyz, because it operated via the keyz.com domain name owned by Landslide.

The AVS system was meant to legally protect the companies from laws against disseminating pornography to minors, as the credit card was used to verify that the user attempting to access a particular website was of legal age to view the website's content. Users could sign up with their credit cards to access affiliated sites, which received 65% of the sign-up fee, while Landslide took the remainder and handled the transactions with the credit card companies.

In 1998, Thomas Reedy recognized systematic fraud in streams of different credit cards being signed up in batches from the same internet address to the same website. In the use of stolen card information, Landslide would have had to bear the loss if there had been a chargeback from the card issuer, often including a penalty fee; also, the credit card industry imposed a 1% maximum for chargebacks. To preserve his business, Reedy traced the source of the traffic, set up a new web service called Badcard.com to capture card numbers coming from the same internet address, and drew up lists of addresses and card numbers that appeared to be suspiciously used. However, his efforts failed to stop the fraudulent charges.

Landslide went out of business in August 1999, as the fraudulent charges passed the 1% ceiling, leading to Superior Credit withdrawing its merchant services on August 10. Without this merchant account, Landslide could not charge credit cards and could no longer fulfill the primary function of the business. Reportedly, the biggest source of fraud at that time was coming through websites run by US law enforcement as part of a sting operation.

== Landslide investigation ==
In April 1999, in Texas, the United States Postal Inspection Service received an internal complaint from postal inspector Robert Adams. Adams had received a tip from Ronnie Miller, an acquaintance in Saint Paul, Minnesota who provided information about a website advertising child pornography. The image in question was being sourced from a website in Indonesia, which presented the question as to whether the USPIS could legally investigate and prosecute it.

In early 1999, the United States Postal Inspection Service engaged the Dallas Police Department to further investigate whether the image from Indonesia could be prosecuted. As a part of a nationwide initiative funded by the Office of Justice Program's Office of Juvenile Justice and Delinquency Prevention (OJJDP), the United States Department of Justice announced a grant from the Internet Crimes Against Children Taskforce Program to the Dallas Police Department on January 10, 1998. The purpose of the ICAC was to investigate and prosecute Internet crimes against children.

The court transcriptions from the case against Landslide Productions revealed that the Dallas Police Department had formed a relationship with Microsoft Corporation after the software maker had encouraged its technical employees to volunteer their time to better the community in which they lived. After having confirmed that prosecution would be difficult because the image in question was indeed being sourced from Indonesia, the Dallas Police Department asked its local Microsoft volunteers to assist in investigating the image. Using Web Buddy, a computer program designed to display Internet traffic on geographic maps, the volunteers helped the Dallas police verify that internet traffic related to Ronnie Miller's complaint was passing through the routers of Ft. Worth-based Landslide Productions.

An adult classified section of the Landslide website allegedly included postings offering to trade Landslide-owned Keyz passwords, and illegal child pornography sites were found to be using the Keyz payment system. The U.S. Postal Inspection Service (USPIS) and Dallas police presented their findings to Terri Moore, an Assistant District Attorney in the Dallas/Fort Worth area, and received warrants to search the Landslide business offices and the Reedy home. In August 1999, 45 to 50 law enforcement officials from a number of agencies conducted a raid on the Landslide business offices in Fort Worth.

The raid of the Reedys' Fort Worth residence resulted in the confiscation of a home computer, on which computer expert Dane Heiskel uncovered business emails confirming his knowledge of customers using Reedy's payment system to access child pornography. Sexually explicit images of children were also found on this computer.

Police seized the assets and records of Landslide and arrested Thomas and Janice Reedy (see United States v. Reedy - 4:00-cr-00054). Prosecutors offered Thomas a 20-year prison term and Janice a five-year term if they would plead guilty, but the Reedys refused the plea deal, believing they could not be held legally responsible for the content of third-party websites. Reedy maintained that he had attempted to run a legitimate business by writing software to reduce fraud, reporting illegal sites to the Federal Bureau of Investigation (FBI), and cooperating with the ensuing investigations. According to Reedy, he was told by Special Agent Frank Super to leave the sites in his index for later investigation.

In January 2000, Thomas Reedy was convicted of trafficking in child pornography through testimony from witnesses, including Sharon Girling, a UK police officer at SOCA/NCS. Based on a prior police investigation in the UK, Girling identified victims in the pictures from a website that used the Landslide payment system. Thomas Reedy was sentenced to 1,335 years in prison, a sentence that was reduced to 180 years on appeal.

== Operation Avalanche ==
The Reedy case led to the creation of a nationwide network of 30 federally funded task forces to fight Internet crimes against children. In August 2001, Attorney General John Ashcroft and Chief Postal Inspector Kenneth Weaver announced the launch of Operation Avalanche, an operation to gather evidence against users of the Landslide gateway and payment system. The seized database records included 35,000 US subscribers, some of whom were targeted with invitations to purchase child pornography by mail. The Chicago Tribune reported that the government also continued to run the Reedys' Landslide website for a time as part of the sting. As a result of Operation Avalanche, 100 suspects were arrested following 144 searches in 37 states.

The FBI then passed identities from the database to the police organizations of other countries, including 7,272 names in the UK and 2,329 names in Canada. Initial results of the operation seemed positive, as the gateway site and payment system were closed down and thousands of possible users of child pornography websites were identified for later investigation.

== Controversies ==
Police conducting Operation Ore in the UK targeted all names for investigation due to the difference in laws between the US and the UK, which allowed for arrest on a charge of incitement to distribute child pornography based solely on the presence of a name in the database, regardless of whether the card was used—fraudulently or not—for child pornography or for other legal adult sites. Law in the UK allows conviction on the basis of incitement to distribute indecent images; as such, the mere presence on the database, regardless of the legality of the sites paid for, was sufficient to warrant prosecution. In all, 3,744 people were investigated, and arrested and 1,451 of those were convicted. However, a subsequent challenge by those targeted led to an independent reconstruction of the Landslide site and a closer inspection of the database and the payment transactions.

In 2005 and 2007, UK investigative journalist Duncan Campbell wrote a series of articles criticizing police forensic procedures and trial evidence. After obtaining copies of the Landslide hard drives, Campbell publicly identified evidence of massive credit card fraud, including thousands of charges where there was no access to any porn site at all. Campbell stated, "Independent computer expert Jim Bates of Computer Investigations said 'the scale of the fraud, especially hacking, just leapt off the screen'."

Campbell's articles also indicated that sworn statements provided by Dallas detective Steve Nelson and US postal inspector Michael Mead were false. They testified that entry to the Landslide site was through a front-page screen featuring a button saying "Click Here (for) Child Porn." However, the later investigation established that the button was never on the website's front page. Instead, it was on an advertising banner for another website buried deep in the Landslide offerings.

After Campbell's articles appeared, independent computer expert Jim Bates of "Computer Investigations" was charged and convicted of four counts of making false statements and one count of perjury regarding his qualifications and barred from appearing as an expert witness. He was later arrested for possession of indecent images during his Operation Ore investigation. However, the search of Bates' home was later ruled unlawful.

== Results ==
=== Country-specific results ===
- Australia 200 arrests (see Operation Auxin)
- Canada - Operation Snowball
- Ireland (see Operation Amethyst)
- Germany (see Operation Pecunia)
- Switzerland (see Operation Genesis aka Action Genesis)
- United Kingdom (see Operation Ore)
- United States (see Operation Avalanche)

== Participating law enforcement agencies ==
- Australia - Australian Federal Police (AFP)
- Canada
- Germany
- Italy
- Switzerland
- United Kingdom - National Crime Agency (NCA)
- United States - Federal Bureau of Investigation (FBI)

== See also ==
- Duncan Campbell
- Operation Falcon (child pornography investigation)
