= Operation Genesis =

2002–2004 police operation in Zurich, Switzerland

- Operation name: Operation Genesis
- Type: Child pornography crackdown

Participants
- Executed by: Australia, Canada, Germany, Ireland, Switzerland, United Kingdom, United States

Mission
- Target: Associated credit card holders used for memberships associated with website portal Landslide Productions
- Objective: To round up and prosecute suspects named in a Tip by the United States FBI from Operation Avalanche

Timeline
- Date begin: September 2002
- Date end: May 2004

Results
- Suspects: 13000+
- Indictments: 320
- Convictions: 124

The Genesis Operation was an operation carried out by the Swiss Federal Office of Police (Fedpol), the judiciary of the canton of Zurich, and the Cantonal Police of the other cantons of Switzerland between September 2002 and May 2004 against the possession of illegal child pornography in the form of digital images based on a United States tip to Interpol with information about the use of credit cards.

== US investigation ==
Between 1999 and 2001, after a tip, a US investigation was conducted into Landslide Productions Inc., a Texas-based online pornography portal operated by Thomas and Janice Reedy. The portal was found to have provided access to child pornography, and the Reedys were both convicted of trafficking child pornography in August 2001.

Following the investigation and conviction, "Operation Avalanche" was launched in the US to trace and prosecute child pornography users identified in the Landslide database. In addition, the website was run for a short time as part of a sting operation by the FBI to capture new suspects. The FBI also passed identities from the Landslide database to the police organisations of other countries, including 7,272 names to the UK.

== Legality ==
Consumer advocates were concerned about the federal authorities' evaluation of credit card data because they had concerns about data protection.

== Results ==
In 2002, over 1,300 suspicious people from all walks of life were checked in several cantons as part of this campaign. The number of house searches was 36. A total of 320 criminal charges were filed, but 191 cases were discontinued. In the canton of Zurich, 124 people were found guilty; almost all of them were issued a fine, only ten or less in addition to a conditional prison sentence of a maximum of three weeks. With a single exception, it was only possible to prove that the convicts possessed, but not forwarded, the illegal image files. In addition to child pornography, the illegal image files consisted largely of animals and violent pornography.

In the future, the convicted will have a de facto professional ban imposed on them from working in education (as teachers, educators, etc.). Their teaching licenses will be withdrawn, and the information will be shared with the education departments of the other cantons, so that the convicted will not be able to get a job in other cantons either.

=== Country-specific results ===
- Australia 200 arrests (see Operation Auxin)
- Canada - Operation Snowball
- Ireland (see Operation Amethyst)
- Germany (see Operation Pecunia)
- Switzerland (see Operation Genesis a.k.a. Action Genesis)
- United Kingdom (see Operation Ore)
- United States (see Operation Avalanche)

== Participating Law Enforcement Agencies ==
- Australia - Australian Federal Police (AFP)
- Canada
- Italy
- Switzerland:
  - Federal Office of Police
  - Cantonal Police
- United Kingdom - National Crime Agency (NCA)
- United States - Federal Bureau of Investigation (FBI)
