= Operation Amethyst =

Child pornography crackdown in Ireland

- Operation name: Operation Amethyst
- Type: Child pornography crackdown

Participants
- Planned by: United States
- Executed by: Australia, Canada, Germany, Ireland, Switzerland, United Kingdom, United States

Mission
- Target: Associated credit card holders used for memberships associated with website portal Landslide Productions.
- Objective: To round up and prosecute suspects named in a Tip by the United States FBI from Operation Avalanche

Results
- Suspects: 100

Operation Amethyst was a Garda Síochána (police) operation targeting child pornography in the Republic of Ireland. Involving simultaneous searches on May 27, 2002, of over 100 individuals suspected of downloading child pornography, it was one of the largest police operations in Ireland's history.

== US investigation ==
Between 1999 and 2001, after a tip, a US investigation was conducted into Landslide Productions Inc., a Texas-based online pornography portal operated by Thomas and Janice Reedy. The portal was found to have provided access to child pornography, and the Reedys were both convicted of trafficking child pornography in August 2001.

Following the investigation and conviction, "Operation Avalanche" was launched in the US to trace and prosecute child pornography users identified in the Landslide database. In addition, the website was run for a short time as part of a sting operation by the FBI to capture new suspects. The FBI also passed identities from the Landslide database to the police organisations of other countries, including 7,272 names to the UK.

The details of 130 people in Ireland were passed to the Garda Síochána. The homes of over 100 suspected users of the site were raided, including several high-profile individuals, including Circuit Court Judge Brian Curtin and celebrity chef Tim Allen.

It was followed by Operation Ore in the United Kingdom, Operation Snowball in Canada, Operation Pecunia in Germany, Operation Amethyst in Ireland, and Operation Genesis in Switzerland.

== Results ==
=== Country-specific results ===
- Australia 200 arrests (see Operation Auxin)
- Canada - Operation Snowball
- Ireland (see Operation Amethyst)
- Germany (see Operation Pecunia)
- Switzerland (see Operation Genesis a.k.a. Action Genesis)
- United Kingdom (see Operation Ore)
- United States (see Operation Avalanche)
