= Operation Falcon (child pornography investigation) =

In 2003, the New Jersey District Attorney's Office launched an investigation into the activities of the Belarusian firm Regpay Co. Ltd (operated together with the Florida-based Connections company). The company created sites with child porn. The investigation was called Operation Falcon.

The operation involved:

- in the USA — Internal Revenue Service, Bureau of Immigration and Customs Enforcement, Postal Inspection Service, FBI;
- in Belarus — the department for the detection of crimes in the field of high technology of the Ministry of Internal Affairs;
- in the EU countries — the British national unit for combating crimes in the field of high technology, law enforcement agencies of France, Spain and Germany.

The main interaction was conducted between the Belarusian and American services.

The criminals operated about 50 websites (one of them was called the "Underground world of pedophiles") and advertised on various porn resources. At the center of this system was an Internet page through which access to various sites with pedophile content was sold. The criminals themselves were based in Minsk. The criminals received the child porn image from other websites. Access to the sites was paid. Payment was made via credit cards. At the same time, criminals stole money from visitors' cards.

The payment was made through the Latvian banking system. Taking into account this circumstance, Latvian law enforcement officers passed information on the flow of money through the country's banks to their Belarusian colleagues.

On July 30, 2003, the head of Regpay, Egor Zolotarev, and marketing director Alexey Buchnev were detained in France. In June 2004, Alexander Boyko, the company's technical director, was extradited from Spain to the United States. In 2005, they appeared in court in the United States. They all confessed to what they had done. All of them were sentenced to 25 years in prison and fined $25,000. The heads of the firm must also serve five years of parole at the end of their prison term. Also, 1.15 million dollars were confiscated from the convicts.

On February 15, 2004, Eugene Valentine, CEO of Connections, pleaded guilty to conspiracy to launder money for Regpay and its heads.

In addition, numerous website users have been arrested. As of March 2005, more than 1,200 people were arrested, including 200 (later the figure rose to 330, three of them committed suicide) in the United States. About 860 customers were from Australia, Great Britain, Denmark, China, Norway, Spain, Finland, France, Sweden and Switzerland. According to Interpol, "ordinary, average married men with children and a good job" were interested in child pornography. In the United States alone, the names of about 40,000 people who downloaded child porn were identified during the investigation.

As Prosecutor Christopher Christie emphasized, this is the first comprehensive investigation in the United States concerning the child porn industry. Attorney General John Ashcroft, commenting on the investigation, called the operation a blow to "the very heart of the commercial trade in child pornography".

At a hearing before the U.S. Senate Committee on Commerce, Science and Transportation in 2006, Operation Falcon was called an excellent example of how a single investigation can lead to the detention of hundreds of criminals.

== See also ==
- Operation Avalanche (child pornography investigation)
