= Frederick Romberg Award =

National Australian architecture award

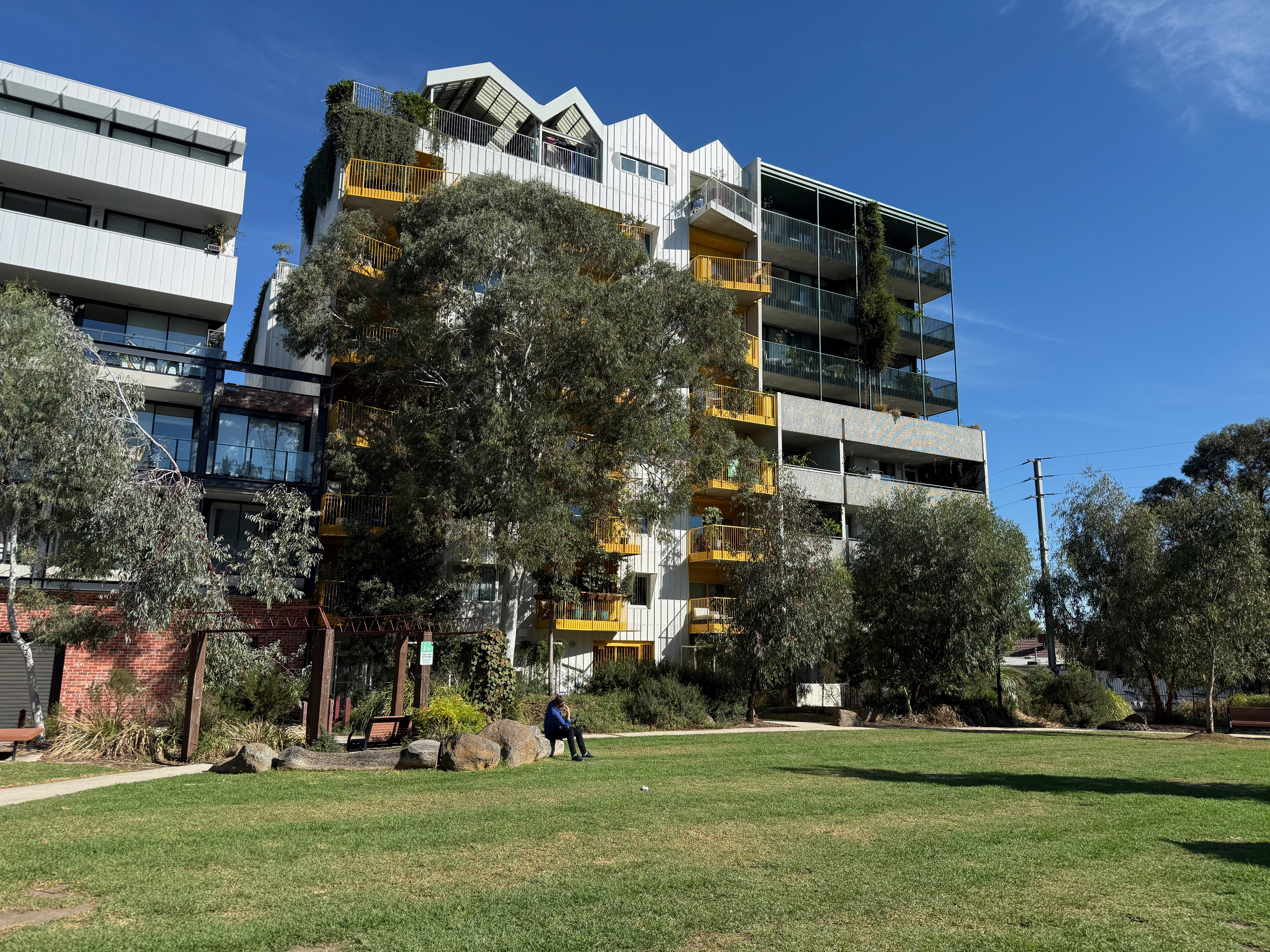
- 2023 Award, Nightingale Village, Brunswick, Melbourne, Victoria
- Awarded for: Multiple Residential Housing (apartments, flats, townhouses, social, student)
- Country: Australia
- Presented by: Australian Institute of Architects
- First award: 2007; 19 years ago
- Currently held by: Smart Design Studio, 2026

The Frederick Romberg Award for Residential Architecture, Multiple Housing is an annual national award presented by the Australian Institute of Architects. It recognises outstanding achievements in multi-residential design with an emphasis on design, innovation, sustainability, and community impact. Winners have included private apartment buildings, townhouses, resorts, student and social housing. The award was first presented in 2007 reflecting a change in focus of residential building typology in architecture and better definition of award categories, occurring as cities and towns became more dense and housing preferences evolved. The change also redefined the Robin Boyd Award as being only for new houses.

== Background ==
=== Definition of the award ===
As per the Australian Institute of Architects Policy No.13 on awards, prizes and honours, Category 5: Residential Housing Multiple Housing Projects category submission must be residential in nature, and comprise or include two or more self-contained dwellings (whether or not the structure includes uses for other purposes). The Named Award is the Frederick Romberg Award for Residential Architecture – Multiple Housing. Secondary awards and recognition are awarded with an Architecture Award: National Award for Residential Architecture – Multiple Housing and commendations receive a National Commendation for Residential Architecture – Multiple Housing.

=== Naming of the award ===
The award is named after architect Frederick Romberg, born 21 June 1913 in Qingdao and died 12 November 1992 in Melbourne, Australia. A Swiss trained architect—who migrated to Australia in 1938—is best known for the architectural partnership Grounds, Romberg and Boyd (1953–1962), and for mid–century apartment buildings constructed in Melbourne.

=== Multiple housing awards before 2007 ===
Prior to establishing the award in 2007, multiple housing projects were infrequently awarded across a range of different awards and categories including the Robin Boyd Award, Urban Design Award or occasionally as a special jury award.

The earliest state based award for multiple dwelling architecture was to Grounds, Romberg and Boyd for 'House and Four Apartments' now known as the (Roy Grounds House) which won a Victorian Architecture Medal in 1954.

== State awards ==
All state chapters of the Australian Institute of Architects now present annual awards in the multiple housing category.

- Victoria: Best Overend Award for Residential Architecture – Multiple Housing (started 2007)
- New South Wales: Aaron Bolot Award for Residential Architecture – Multiple Housing (started 2008)
- Queensland: Job & Froud Award for Residential Architecture – Multiple Housing (started 2009)
- Australian Capital Territory: Sydney Ancher Award for Residential Architecture – Multiple Housing
- South Australia: Newell Platten Award for Award for Residential Architecture – Multiple Housing
- Western Australia: Harold Krantz Award for Residential Architecture – Multiple Housing
- Tasmania: Ray Heffernan Award for Residential Architecture – Multiple Housing (started 2022)
- Northern Territory: Ken Frey Award for Residential Architecture – Multiple Housing

These state–based awards usually serve as a pathway to the national Frederick Romberg Award presented at the annual awards in October or November of each year.

== Recipients ==
Frederick Romberg Award for Residential Architecture — Multiple Housing by year
Year	Architect	Project	Location	State	Type	Other AIA awards
2026	Smart Design Studio	Lacebark	40 Solent Circuit, Norwest	New South Wales	Urban	Aaron Bolot Award for Residential Architecture, Multiple Housing, 2026 (NSW)
2025	Blok Modular and Vokes and Peters	Blok Three Sisters	Point Lookout, North Stradbroke Island	Queensland	Coastal	Residential Architecture Multiple Housing Award, 2025 (Qld)
2024	Six Degrees Architects	Ferrars and York	201—209 Ferrars Street, South Melbourne	Victoria	Inner City	Best Overend Award for Residential Architecture, Multiple Housing, 2024 (Vic)
2023	Architecture Architecture, Austin Maynard Architects, Breathe, Clare Cousins Architects, Hayball and Kennedy Nolan	Nightingale Village	Duckett Street, Brunswick	Victoria	Inner City	Melbourne Prize, 2023; Architecture Award, Multiple Housing, 2023 (Vic)
2022	Studio Bright	Quay Quarter Lanes	8 Loftus Street, Circular Quay, Sydney	New South Wales	CBD	Walter Burley Griffin Award for Urban Design, 2022; Aaron Bolot Award for Residential Architecture, Multiple Housing, 2022 (NSW); Urban Design Award, 2022 (NSW); Lord Mayor's Prize, 2022 (NSW)
2021	Kennedy Nolan	The Lothian	Lothian & Arden Street, North Melbourne	Victoria	Inner City	Architecture Award, Multiple Housing, 2021 (Vic)
2020	Hill Thalis	The Wedge Studio Apartments	12 Dudley Street, Marrickville	New South Wales	Inner City	Architecture Award, Multiple Housing, 2020 (NSW)
2019	Partners Hill with Hogg and Lamb	Mermaid Multihouse	Mermaid Beach	Queensland	Coastal	Architecture Award, New Housing, 2019 (Queensland)
2018	Bates Smart	35 Spring Street	35 Spring Street, Melbourne	Victoria	CBD	Architecture Award, Multiple Housing, 2018 (Vic)
2017	Troppo Architects	Tropology for Defence Housing Australia (DHA)	Darwin	Northern Territory	Inner City	Architecture Award, Multiple Housing, 2017 (NT)
2016	Spaceagency Architects	Knutsford Stage 1	Fremantle	Western Australia	Inner City	Harold Krantz Award for Residential Architecture, Multiple Housing, 2016 (WA)
2015	Jackson Clements Burrows Architects	Upper House	516 Swanston Street, Carlton	Victoria	Inner City	Best Overend Award for Residential Architecture, Multiple Housing, 2015 (Vic)
2014	Breathe	The Commons	Florence Street, Brunswick	Victoria	Inner City	Best Overend Award for Residential Architecture, Multiple Housing, 2014 (Vic)
2013	MGS Architects	McIntyre Drive Social Housing	2 McIntyre Drive, Altona	Victoria	Social	Best Overend Award for Residential Architecture, Multiple Housing, 2013 (Vic)
2012	BVN Architecture	Monash University Student Housing (now Jackomos Hall and Briggs Hall)	44 College Walk, Monash University, Clayton	Victoria	Student Housing	Best Overend Award for Residential Architecture, Multiple Housing, 2012 (Vic); RIBA International Award, 2012
2011	Candelapas	Waterloo Street	Waterloo Street, Surry Hills	New South Wales	Inner City	Aaron Bolot Award for Residential Architecture, Multiple Housing, 2011 (NSW)
2010	Donovan Hill	Seaspray Resort and Spa	28 Cocoanut Point Drive, Zilzie	Queensland	Coastal	Job & Froud Award for Residential Architecture, Multiple Housing, 2010 (Queensland)
2009	Wood Marsh Architecture in association with Sunland Design	Balencea Apartments	454 St Kilda Road, Melbourne	Victoria	Inner City	Architecture Award, Multiple Housing (Vic), 2009
2008	Stanisic Associates	EDO (Environment, Diversity, Operability)	88 Crown Street, Woolloomooloo, Sydney	New South Wales	Inner City	Aaron Bolot Award Award, Multiple Housing (NSW), 2008
2007	Donovan Hill	Cornwall Apartments	35 Terrace Street, Newmarket, Brisbane	Queensland	Inner City	Note: Another Donovan Hill project W4 Apartments won the multiple housing award in Queensland in 2007.

== See also ==
- Australian Institute of Architects Awards and Prizes
- Victorian Architecture Medal
