= Operation Ore =

British police operation to prosecute users of a website featuring child pornography

- Operation name: Operation Ore
- Type: Child pornography crackdown

Participants
- Planned by: United States
- Executed by: Australian Federal Police, United Kingdom, United States

Mission
- Target: associated users associated with website portal Landslide Productions
- Objective: To round up and prosecute suspects named in a Tip by the United States FBI from Operation Avalanche

Timeline
- Date executed: May 2002

Results
- Suspects: 7,250
- Arrests: 3,744
- Criminal complaints: 1,848
- Convictions: 1,451

Operation Ore was a British police operation that commenced in 1999 following information received from US law enforcement, which was intended to prosecute thousands of users of a website reportedly featuring child pornography. It was the United Kingdom's biggest ever computer crime investigation, leading to 7,250 suspects identified, 4,283 homes searched, 3,744 arrests, 1,848 charged, 1,451 convictions, 493 cautioned and 140 children removed from suspected dangerous situations and an estimated 33 suicides. Operation Ore identified and prosecuted some sex offenders, but the validity of the police procedures was later questioned, as errors in the investigations resulted in many false arrests.

Operation Ore followed a similar crackdown in the United States, called Operation Avalanche; in the US, 100 people were charged from the 35,000 US access records available. In total, 390,000 individuals in over 60 countries were found to have accessed material in the combined investigations.

== US investigation ==
Between 1999 and 2001, after a tip, a US investigation was conducted into Landslide Productions Inc., a Texas-based online pornography portal operated by Thomas and Janice Reedy. The portal was found to have provided access to child pornography, and the Reedys were both convicted of trafficking child pornography in August 2001.

Following the investigation and conviction, "Operation Avalanche" was launched in the US to trace and prosecute child pornography users identified in the Landslide database. In addition, the website was run for a short time as part of a sting operation by the FBI to capture new suspects. The FBI also passed identities from the Landslide database to the police organisations of other countries, including 7,272 names to the UK.

== Operation Ore ==
In May 2002, Operation Ore was implemented in the UK to investigate and prosecute the Landslide users whose names were provided by the FBI. Those under investigation were reported by Rebecca Smithers of The Guardian to include government ministers, MPs, and judges.

The charge of possession of child pornography was used where evidence was found, but the lesser charge of incitement was used in those cases where a user's details were on the Landslide database but no images were found on the suspect's computer or in their home. Because of the number of names on the FBI list, the scale of the investigation in the UK was overwhelming for the police, who appealed to the government for emergency funding for the case. Reportedly, several million pounds were spent on the investigations, and complaints mounted that other investigations were put at risk because of the diversion of the resources of child protection units into the case.

Information from the Operation Ore list of names was leaked to the press early in 2003. After obtaining the list, The Sunday Times stated that it included the names of a number of prominent individuals, some of which were later published by the press. The Sunday Times reported that the list included at least twenty senior executives, a senior teacher at a girls' public school, personnel from military bases, GPs, university academics, and civil servants, a famous newspaper columnist, a songwriter for a pop band, a member of a chart-topping 1980s cult pop group, and an official with the Church of England. An investigation followed the leak, and police complained that the advance warning would allow suspected paedophiles to dispose of evidence. A police officer was reported to have lost his job for leaking the names.

== Legal challenges ==
After 2003, Operation Ore came under closer scrutiny, with police forces in the UK being criticised for their handling of the operation. The most common criticism was that they failed to determine whether or not the owners of credit cards in Landslide's database actually accessed any sites containing child abuse images, unlike in the US, where it was determined in advance whether or not credit card subscribers had purchased child abuse material. Investigative journalist Duncan Campbell exposed these flaws in a series of articles in 2005 and 2007.

Many of the charges at the Landslide-affiliated sites were made using stolen credit card information, and the police arrested the real owners of the credit cards, not the viewers. Thousands of credit card charges were made where there was no access to a site or access only to a dummy site. When the police checked, seven years after Operation Ore commenced, they found 54,348 occurrences of stolen credit card information in the Landslide database. The British police failed to provide this information to the defendants and, in some cases, implied that they had checked and found no evidence of credit card fraud when no such check had been done. Because of the nature of the charges, children were removed from the homes immediately. In the two years it took the police to determine that thousands had been falsely accused, over 100 children had been removed from their homes and denied any unsupervised time with their fathers. The arrests also led to an estimated 33 suicides by 2007.

One man was charged when the sole "suspicious" image in his possession was of young-looking—but adult—actress Melissa Ashley. Also arrested were Massive Attack's Robert Del Naja (later cleared) and The Who's guitarist Pete Townshend, who was cautioned by the police after acknowledging credit card access to the Landslide website. Duncan Campbell later stated in PC Pro magazine that their credit card charges and IP addresses were traced through the Landslide site, and both were found to have accessed sites which had nothing to do with child pornography. The actor and writer Chris Langham was among those convicted.

Independent investigators later obtained both the database records and video of the Landslide raid. When this information was presented in a UK court, Michael Mead of the United States Postal Service contradicted his US testimony under oath regarding several details relating to the investigation. As a result of the errors exposed in the cases, some people arrested in Operation Ore filed a group action lawsuit in 2006 against the detectives behind Operation Ore, alleging false arrest.

After Campbell's articles appeared, the independent computer expert Jim Bates, who analysed the hard drives, was charged and convicted of four counts of making false statements and one count of perjury regarding his qualifications and barred from appearing as an expert witness. Bates's judgement has been called into question on other matters. Bates was later arrested for possession of indecent images during his Operation Ore investigations. The search of Bates' home was ruled unlawful, as the police had applied for the search warrant using the wrong section of PACE and were unable to examine any of the material seized from his house.

CEOP and its chief executive, Jim Gamble, were accused of using vague terms which do not have a recognised meaning within either child protection or law enforcement when they defended the operation.

On 6 December 2010, senior Court of Appeal judges rejected the appeal of Anthony O'Shea, stating that they were "entirely confident that the appellant was rightly convicted." The judgement states in relation to the appellant's assertions regarding the claim that his IP address had been disguised: "These suggestions are fanciful in the extreme. The appellant's theory (for it is no more than such) that he [Mr O'Shea] was the victim of the machinations of a fraudulent webmaster is, in our view, pure speculation." Jim Bates, an expert witness and critic of Operation Ore, was criticised for misleading comments during the hearing. The appeal had been considered to be a landmark case where success could have led to many of the other convictions achieved as a result of Ore being overturned.

== Results ==
=== Country-specific results ===
- Australia 200 arrests (see Operation Auxin)
- Canada - Operation Snowball
- Ireland (see Operation Amethyst)
- Germany (see Operation Pecunia)
- Switzerland (see Operation Genesis aka Action Genesis)
- United Kingdom (see Operation Ore)
- United States (see Operation Avalanche)

== Participating law enforcement agencies ==
- Australia - Australian Federal Police (AFP)
- United Kingdom - National Crime Agency (NCA)
- United States - Federal Bureau of Investigation (FBI)

== See also ==
- Child Exploitation and Online Protection Centre
- Internet Watch Foundation
- Virtual Global Taskforce
