= Commonwealth Law Courts, Brisbane =

Building in Queensland, Australia

Coordinates: 27°28′08.53″S 153°01′11.20″E

Harry Gibbs Commonwealth Law Courts Building
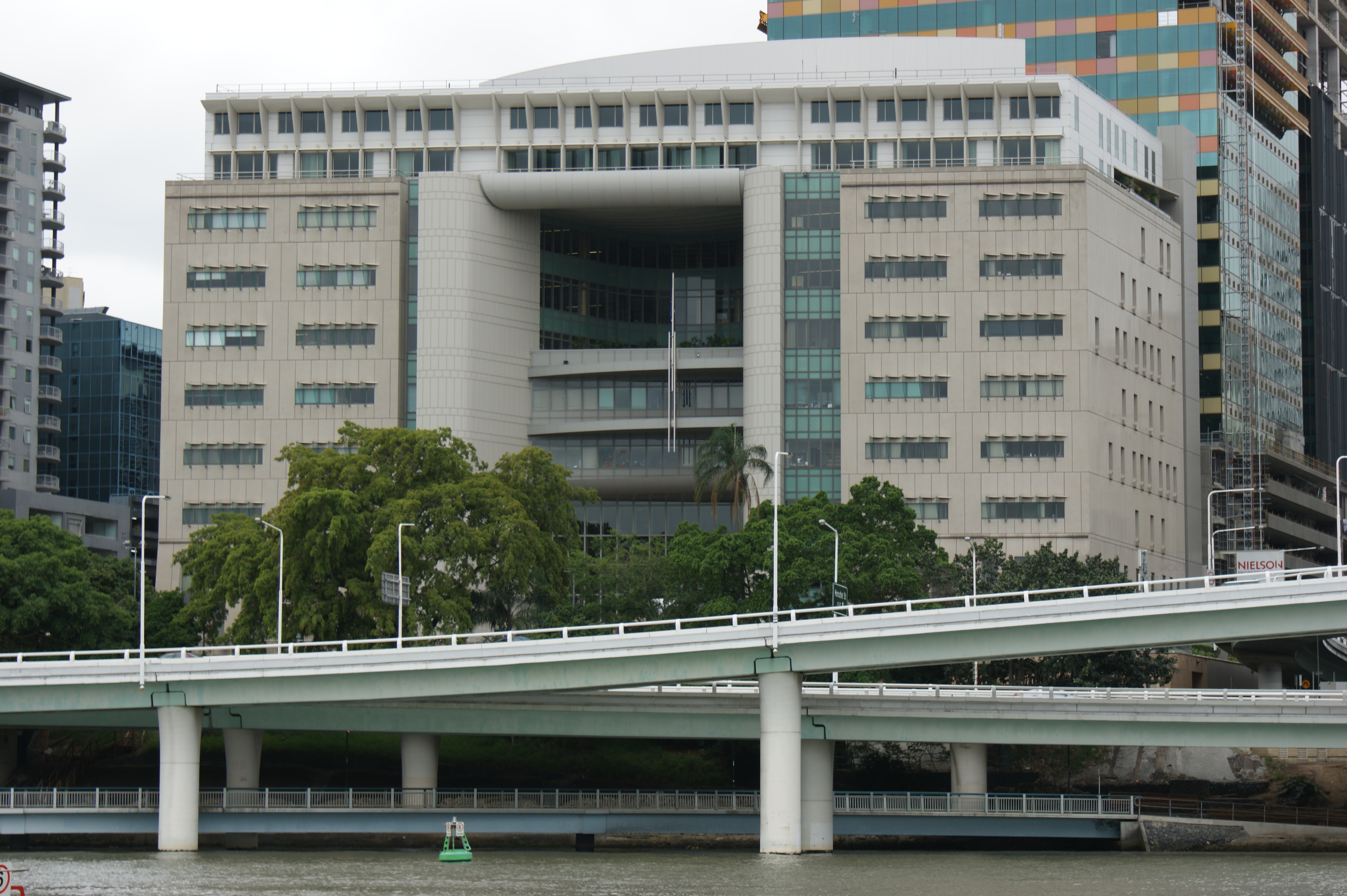
- Commonwealth Law Courts from South Bank
- Interactive map of the Harry Gibbs Commonwealth Law Courts Building area

General information
- Location: 119 North Quay, Brisbane, Queensland, Australia
- Completed: 1993
- Cost: A$130M
- Client: Department of Attorney, Commonwealth of Australia

Technical details
- Floor count: 13
- Floor area: 32,000 m^{2} (340,000 sq ft)

Design and construction
- Architect: John Grealy
- Architecture firm: Australian Construction Services in association with Peddle Thorp Architects

The Harry Gibbs Commonwealth Law Courts Building (often known in Brisbane simply as the Commonwealth Law Courts, although the northern part of the Peter Durack Building in Perth is also called Commonwealth Law Courts) contains the Queensland registries of the High Court of Australia and the Federal Court of Australia; and the Brisbane registries of the Family Court of Australia, Federal Circuit Court of Australia and the Administrative Appeals Tribunal. It is located at 119 North Quay in the Brisbane CBD.

The 13-storey building, designed by John Grealy with the Australian Construction Services in association with Peddle Thorp Architects, contains 33 courtrooms and 29 judge's chambers, as well as administration and prisoner holding facilities. The Commonwealth Law Courts' formal entrance is on North Quay, with a 25-metre (82 ft) wide stairway leading from the street to an eight–storey atrium. The working entrance is located on Tank Street. The building is named after former Chief Justice of Australia, Sir Harry Gibbs.

In 1993 the project was awarded the FDG Stanley Award for Public Architecture. In 2022 the building was awarded the Robin Gibson Award for Enduring Architecture by the Queensland Chapter of the Australian Institute of Architects.
