= Child Exploitation and Online Protection Command =

Command of the National Crime Agency

- Logo of CEOP
- Abbreviation: CEOP

Agency overview
- Formed: 24 April 2006; 20 years ago
- Preceding agency: Paedophile Online Investigation Team

Jurisdictional structure
- National agency: United Kingdom
- Operations jurisdiction: United Kingdom
- CEOP's jurisdiction
- Area: 94,526 sq mi (244,820 km^{2})
- Population: 70,000,000

Operational structure
- Sworn members: 120 (approx.)
- Elected officer responsible: Shabana Mahmood, Home Secretary
- Agency executive: John Denley, Director
- Parent agency: National Crime Agency

Website
- ceop.police.uk

The Child Exploitation and Online Protection Command, or CEOP Command, is a command of the UK's National Crime Agency (NCA), and is tasked to work both nationally and internationally to bring online child sex offenders, including those involved in the production, distribution and viewing of child abuse material, to the UK courts. The centre was formed in April 2006 as the Child Exploitation and Online Protection Centre, and was absorbed into the NCA on 7 October 2013 by the Crime and Courts Act 2013.

== Purpose and operations ==
CEOP combines police powers with expertise from the business sector, government, specialist charities and other interested organisations.

=== Partners ===
CEOP is made up of police officers with specialist experience of tracking and prosecuting sex offenders, working with people from organisations including the NSPCC and Childnet, Microsoft, and AOL. Partnerships have been set up across non-government bodies, including: Action for Children, NSPCC, Barnardos; business (Microsoft, AOL, Serco, Vodafone etc.) and UK Government departments (Department for Education; Home Office; Foreign and Commonwealth Office etc.). CEOP works with organisations such as The Scout Association, the Football Association, the England and Wales Cricket Board, BT, and Lycos to widen the scope of its work.

=== Budget ===
The CEOP's Home Office funding was frozen in 2010 and reduced by 10% over the subsequent three years. Staff numbers were increased during this period according to the CEOP, though former employees dispute this. In 2012–13, the budget was £6 million and there were 109 posts, which included 13 seconded police officers. Additional money and resources came from the NSPCC, Google, Microsoft, and BAE Systems Detica.

=== Global work ===
The CEOP Centre is also a partner in an international law enforcement alliance – the Virtual Global Taskforce. This was set up in 2004 and provides an international alliance of law enforcement agencies across Australia, the US, and Canada as well as Interpol in bringing a global policing response to censoring the Internet.

=== Faculties ===
The centre is split into three faculties; Intelligence, Harm Reduction and Operations. Each faculty is supported by teams covering governance, communications, partnerships and corporate services. The intelligence faculty receive intelligence of online and offline offenders; all reports made through the centre's website, and ThinkUKnow are dealt with at any time of day so that law enforcement action can be taken. The Harm Reduction faculty manage Public Awareness campaigns and educational programmes, including the ThinkUKnow education programme, which is currently being used in UK schools. The Operations Faculty aims to tackle both abusers and those who exploit children for financial gain. Web browser integration is available via a CEOP browser extension for Firefox, Google Chrome and a customised Internet Explorer.

=== Director ===
Johnny Gwynne is the Director of NCA-CEOP. Before joining the NCA Johnny was a serving Chief Officer with Police Scotland and had previously been Deputy Director General of the Scottish Crime and Drug Enforcement Agency. He was seconded to the NCA in June 2013 and was Deputy Director of the Organised Crime Command before competing for and being appointed to the role of Director of the CEOP Command.

Previous heads of CEOP include Jim Gamble and Peter Davies.

== Prosecutions ==
CEOP gained its first successful prosecution in June 2006, when Lee Costi, 21, of Haslemere, Surrey, was sentenced at Nottingham Crown Court where he admitted grooming schoolgirls for sex, as well as possession of indecent images of children. Costi was caught when a Nottingham girl told her mother about his chatroom messages. Judge Jonathan Teare sentenced Costi to a total of nine years in prison.

Following this, in June 2007, Timothy Cox was jailed at a court in Buxhall, Suffolk, following a 10-month operation by CEOP Officers, as well as other Virtual Global Taskforce Members, leading to 700 new suspects being followed up by law enforcement agencies around the world.

The CEOP claims to have disrupted or dismantled 262 sex-offender networks between 2006 and 2010, and it says inquiries by its online investigators have led to more than 1,000 arrests during that period.

== Independent Police Complaints Commission (IPCC) investigation ==
In September 2015, gross misconduct notices were served on four police officers who had held management roles in CEOP. The actions were part of an Independent Police Complaints Commission (IPCC) investigation into a 16-month delay in passing on information about 2,345 British child abuse suspects which had been received in 2012 from the Toronto Police Service. A spokesman for the IPCC said: "Two of the officers have retired since the incident, one officer remains at the National Crime Agency (NCA) and one officer who was on secondment from Lincolnshire Police has since returned there. All four notices are for failing to adequately progress and manage the referral by Toronto Police from Project Spade. The investigation remains ongoing." The information received from Canada included details about doctor Myles Bradbury, who was subsequently imprisoned for 22 years for sexual assaults on 18 child patients at Addenbrooke's Hospital in Cambridge, and Martin Goldberg, the deputy head of Thorpe Hall School in Southend, who was found dead the day after he was interviewed by police about images of children undressing in changing rooms which had been found in his possession.

== See also ==
- Internet Watch Foundation
- Operation Ore
