= Virtual Global Taskforce =

Group of law enforcement agencies formed against child pornography

The Virtual Global Taskforce (VGT) is a group of law enforcement agencies from around the world who operate together to stop online child sex abuse. The VGT was founded in 2003 by Homeland Security Investigations (HSI) the investigative arm of the U.S. Immigration and Customs Enforcement (ICE) which is part of the U.S. Department of Homeland Security (DHS). Comprised initially of only Australia, Canada, the United Kingdom, and the United States it has expanded to more than 12 countries since then. As of 2024 the National Crime Agency (NCA) of the United Kingdom is leading the VGT.

== Member Countries/Law Enforcement Agencies and Divisions ==
The VGT is made up of the following organizations:

- Australian High-Tech Crime Centre / Australian Federal Police (AFP) (Australia)
- Bundeskriminalamt (BKA) (Germany)
- Central Office for the Fight against Crimes against Humanity, Genocide, and War Crimes (OCLCH) (France)
- Child Exploitation and Online Protection Centre, part of the National Crime Agency (NCA) (United Kingdom) and 2024 VGT leader
- Colombian National Police (Colombia)
- Cybercrime Coordination Unit Switzerland (CYCO) (Switzerland)
- Dutch National Police (The Netherlands)
- Europol
- Interpol
- Italian Postal and Communication Police Service
- Cybercrime Investigation Division (CID) of the Korean National Police Agency (KNP) (South Korea)
- Royal Canadian Mounted Police (Canada)
- New Zealand Police (New Zealand)
- Ministry of Interior for the United Arab Emirates (United Arab Emirates)
- Philippine National Police (The Philippines)
- Homeland Security Investigations, a part of U.S. Immigration and Customs Enforcement (ICE), an investigative arm of the Department of Homeland security (DHS). (United States)

== See also ==
- Operation Ore
