= Troppo =

Troppo may refer to:

- Troppo, a musical term meaning "too much"
- Troppo (TV series), a 2022 Australian television series
- Troppo Architects, an Australian architectural practice

== See also ==
- Troppo Man, a novel by Gerard Lee
