= Northern Territory Enduring Architecture Award =

Annual award for culturally significant buildings in Northern Territory, Australia

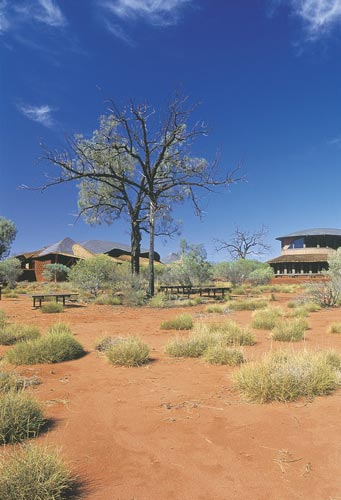
- 2025 Award, Uluṟu-Kata Tjuṯa Cultural Centre
- Awarded for: Outstanding NT architecture over time (25 years or more)
- Country: Australia
- Presented by: Australian Institute of Architects (Northern Territory Chapter)
- First award: 2013; 13 years ago
- Currently held by: Gregory Burgess, 2025

The Northern Territory Enduring Architecture Award is an architecture prize presented annually by the Northern Territory Chapter of the Australian Institute of Architects (AIA) since the inaugural award in 2013. The award recognises significant, long lasting and innovative architecture with usually more than 25 years passed since the completion of construction.

== Background ==
The Award for Enduring Architecture recognises achievement for the design of buildings of outstanding merit, which have remained important as high quality works of architecture when considered in contemporary cultural, social, economic and environmental contexts in the Northern Territory. Nominations for the award can be made by AIA members, non–members and non–architects, but they must provide adequate material and information supporting the nomination for consideration of the jury.

The average age of the 10 projects recognised from 2013 to 2025 is 41.9 years from completion of construction to year of award.

== National Award Winners ==
Recipients of the state–based award are eligible for consideration of the National Award for Enduring Architecture presented later in the same year, as part of the Australian National Architecture Awards.

Only one project located in the Northern Territory has won the national award. In 2019 the Ayers Rock Resort (now Sails in the Desert) at Yulara by Philip Cox & Partners won both the local and national award, 35 years after the project was completed in 1984.

== List of award recipients ==
Northern Territory Enduring Architecture Awards (reverse order)
Year	Architect	Project	Location	Year built	Years since	Other AIA Awards
2026	No Award					
2025	Gregory Burgess	Uluṟu-Kata Tjuṯa Cultural Centre	Uluru Road, Uluṟu-Kata Tjuṯa National Park	1995	30 years	National Award for Enduring Architecture, 2025; High Commendation, Sir Zelman Cowen Award for Public Architecture, 1995; Tracy Memorial Award, 1995 (NT); New Institutional Building Award, 1995 (NT); People's Choice Award, 1995 (NT)
2024	The Architects Studio	Wesleyan Methdodist Church (now Eva's Cafe)	Knuckey Street & Mitchell Street, Darwin City (1897) then rebuilt in Darwin Botanic Gardens (2001)	1897 & 2001	127 years	
2023	Meldrum Burrows and Partners (Tim Rogers)	Parliament House and State Square	15 Mitchell Street, Darwin City	1994	29 years	
2022	No Award					
2021	No Award					
2020	No Award					
2019	Philip Cox & Partners	Ayers Rock Resort (now Sails in the Desert)	Yulara	1984	35 years	National Award for Enduring Architecture, 2019; Sir Zelman Cowen Award for Public Architecture, 1985
2018	Troppo Architects in association with Glenn Murcutt	Bowali Visitors Centre	Kakadu National Park	1993	25 years	Sir Zelman Cowen Award for Public Architecture, 1994; Tracy Memorial Award, 1994 (NT Chapter); Colorbond Award for Steel Architecture, 1994 (National Award); People's Choice Award, 1994 (NT Chapter)
2017	Andrew McPhee	Our Lady of the Sacred Heart Catholic Church	4 Hartley Street, Alice Springs	1969	48 years	
2016	Graeme Whitford for KROMA	Raffles Plaza Apartments	1 Buffalo Court, Darwin	1984	32 years	
2015	Guy Maron Architects	Alice Springs Railway Station	George Crescent, Alice Springs	1980	35 years	
2014	Troppo Architects	Troppoville (group of 8 houses)	Martin Crescent, Coconut Grove	1983	31 years	Colorbond Award for Steel Architecture, 2014 (NT Chapter)
2013	Woodhead Australia Architects	Vestey's Darwin High School Gymnasium (The Tank)	Atkins Drive, Darwin City	1987	26 years	

== Gallery of awarded projects ==
Northern Territory Enduring Architecture Award
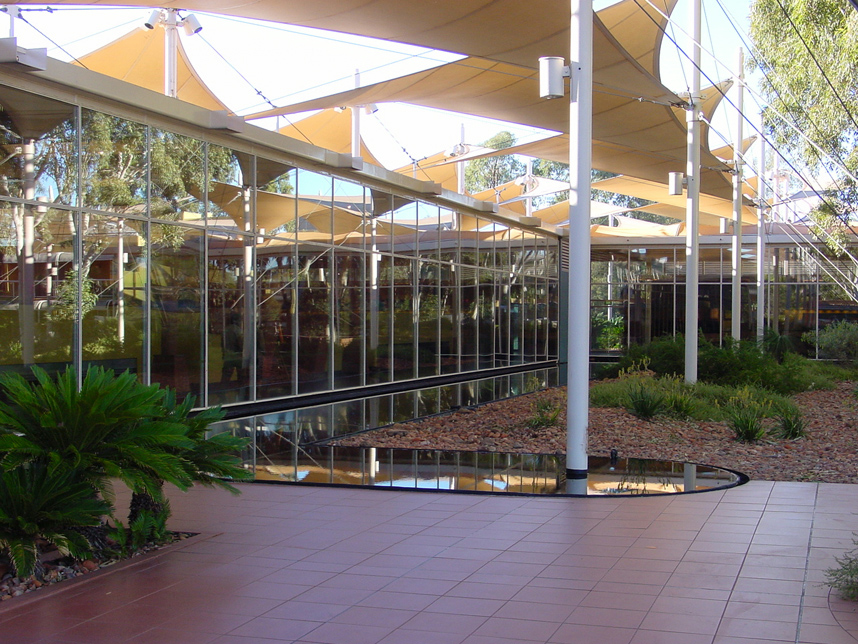
2019 Award, Ayers Rock Resort, Yulara, opened 1984

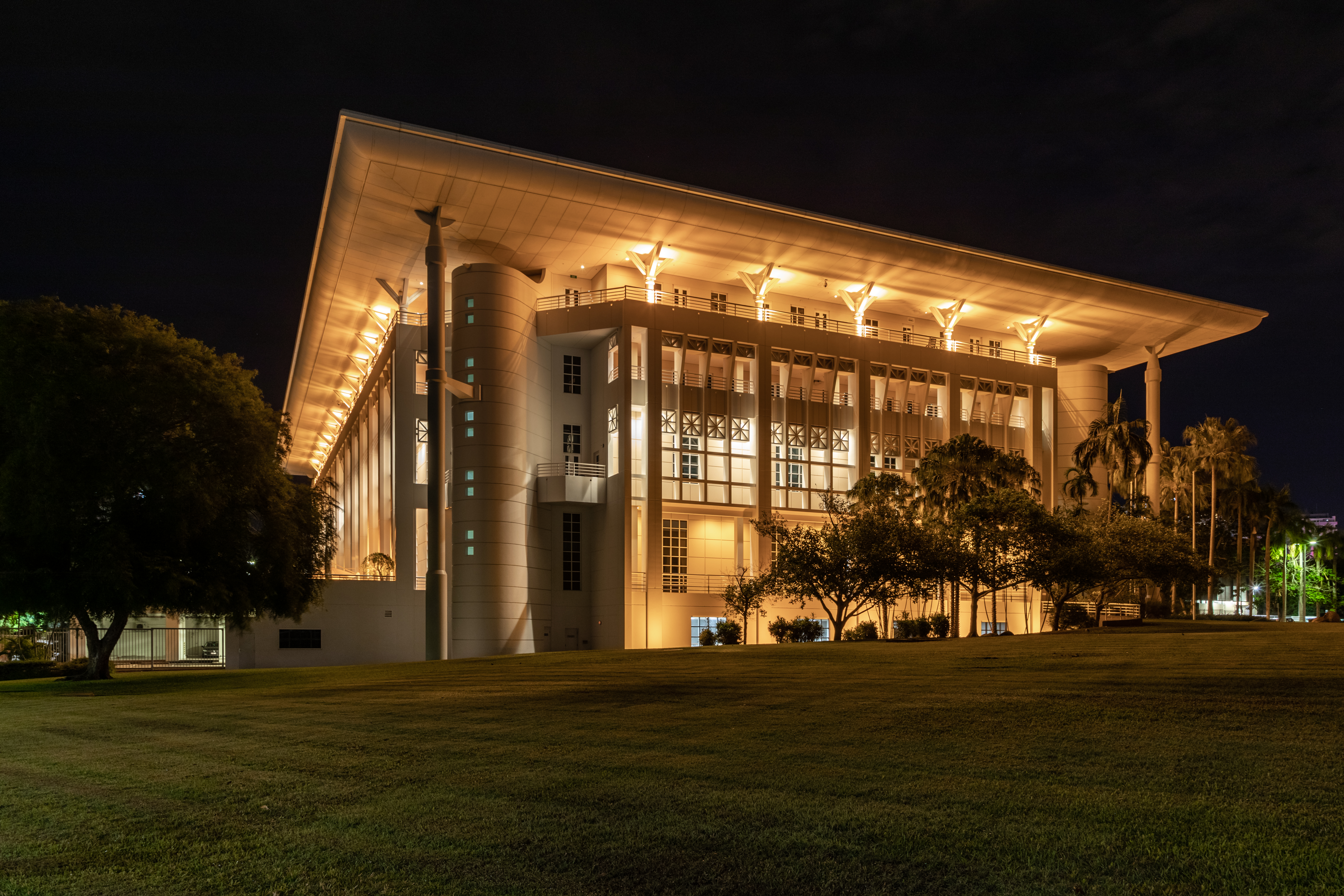
2023 Award, Parliament House, Darwin, opened 1994

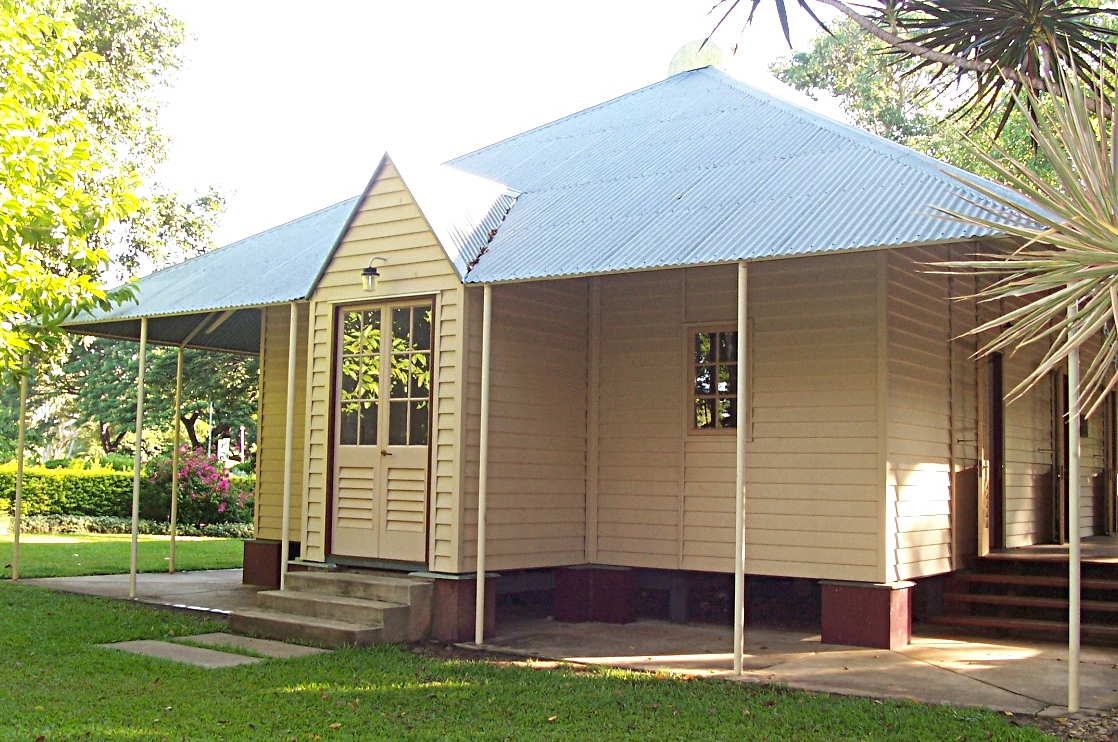
2024 Award, Wesleyan Methodist Church of Australia, built 1897

== See also ==
- Australian Institute of Architects
- Australian Institute of Architects Awards and Prizes
- National Award for Enduring Architecture
- Jack Cheesman Award for Enduring Architecture (South Australia)
- Maggie Edmond Enduring Architecture Award (Victoria)
- New South Wales Enduring Architecture Award
- Robin Gibson Award for Enduring Architecture (Queensland)
- Sir Roy Grounds Award for Enduring Architecture (Australian Capital Territory)
- Tasmania Award for Enduring Architecture
- Richard Roach Jewell Award for Enduring Architecture (Western Australia)
