= Gregory Burgess =

Australian architect

- Education: University of Melbourne
- Occupation: Architect
- Awards: RAIA Gold Medal (2004); Sir Zelman Cowen Award for Public Architecture (1990); Victorian Architecture Medal (1987); Melbourne Prize (2002); Maggie Edmond Enduring Architecture Award (2010 & 2023); National Award for Enduring Architecture (2023); Northern Territory Enduring Architecture Award (2025); National Award for Enduring Architecture (2025)
- Practice: Gregory Burgess Architects
- Buildings: Uluṟu-Kata Tjuṯa Cultural Centre; Brambuk: Living Cultural Centre; Catholic Church of St Michael & St John

Gregory Burgess is an Australian architect based in Melbourne, Victoria. Burgess is especially notable for his buildings for Indigenous communities in Australia, and for his participatory design approach which has produced some remarkable and unique buildings.

He graduated from the Faculty of Architecture, Building and Planning at the University of Melbourne in 1970. He has led a practice called the Gregory Burgess Architects for 32 years.

Gregory Burgess received the RAIA Gold Medal in 2004, the Australian architecture profession's highest accolade. He has received over 40 professional and community awards including the Sir Zelman Cowen Award for Public Architecture and Victorian Architecture Medal.

His work has been exhibited at major galleries in London, Amsterdam, Tokyo, Edinburgh and all Australian cities. Eminent international journal Architectural Review claimed that:

"[Burgess is among a select group of architects on the global stage who] ... tend the flame of hope and carry the lamp of truth in a world that seems increasingly to have no values other than profit and the market in its grossest form".

== Notable projects ==
- Eltham Library
- Catholic Theological College
- Brambuk Living Cultural Centre
- Box Hill Community Arts Centre
- Uluru-Kata Tjuta Cultural Centre
- St John, Woolamai Surf Club
- Twelve Apostles Visitor Centre
- Sidney Myer Music Bowl Refurbishment
- Catholic Church of St Michael & St John, Horsham
