= Rachel Neeson =

Australian architect and academic

Rachel Neeson is an Australian architect and lecturer in architecture. Her architecture practice is Neeson Murcutt Architects, which she formed with her partner Nick Murcutt in 2004.

== Early life and education ==
Rachel Neeson studied architecture at the University of Sydney School of Architecture, Design and Planning, and graduated with the University Medal in 1993.

She was awarded the NSW Architects Registration Board's 2002 Byera Hadley Travelling Scholarship, and completed a master's degree in architecture in Barcelona, Spain.

== Career ==
Neeson formed the architecture practice Neeson Murcutt Architects with her partner Nick Murcutt in 2004. Murcutt died in 2011.

Some of the practice's most notable projects have been the redesign of the Prince Alfred Pool and the Juanita Nielsen Community Centre, both in Sydney.

As of 2018 Neeson lectures in architecture at the University of Sydney.

== Recognition and awards ==
Neeson Murcutt Architects was awarded the Australian Institute of Architects Robin Boyd Award for Residential Architecture – Houses (New) in 2011.

Neeson Murcutt Architects won the Australian Institute of Architects' New South Wales Wilkinson Award in 2007 and in 2009, and the Robin Boyd Award in 2011.
