= National Award for Enduring Architecture =

Annual Australian architecture award for significant buildings more than 25 years old

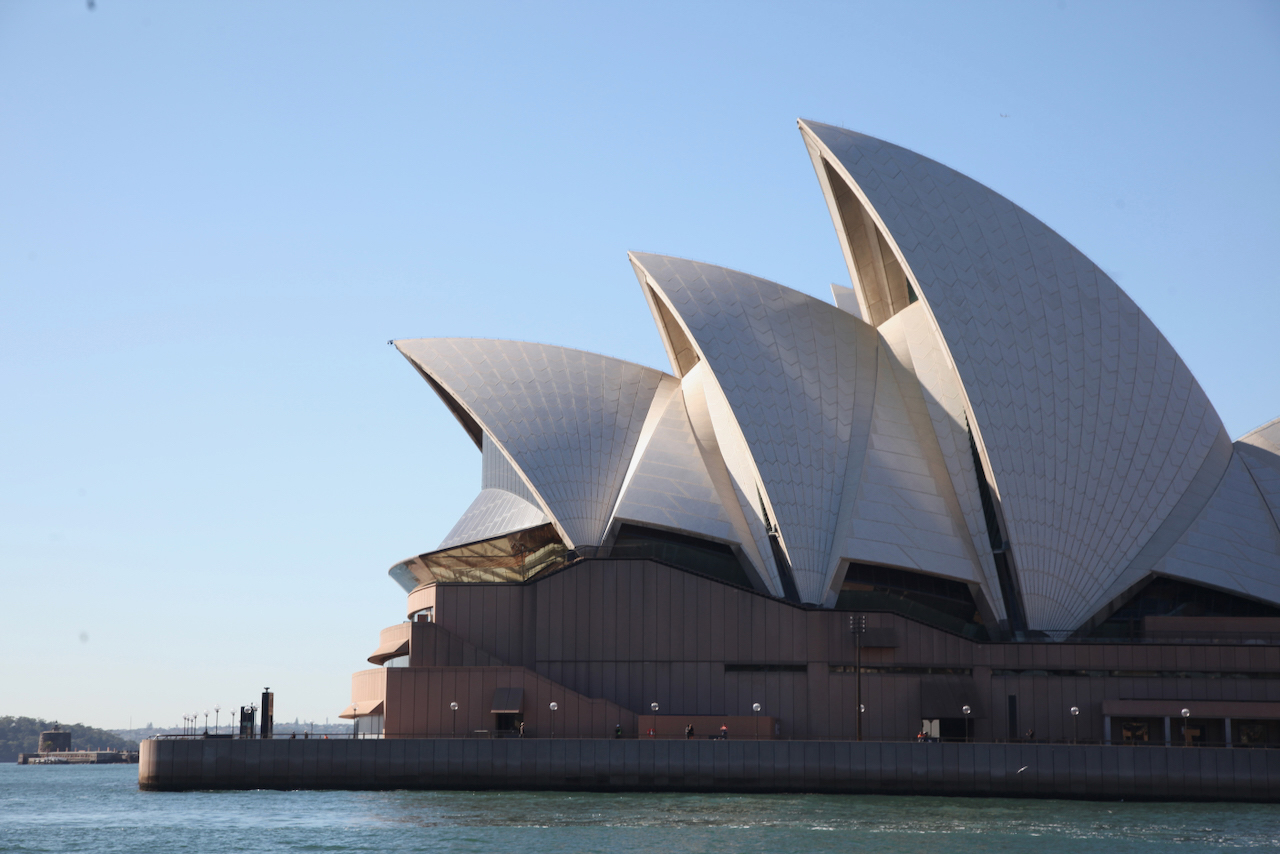
- Sydney Opera House, recipient of the inaugural Award, 2003
- Awarded for: Significant Australian architecture more than 25 years old
- Country: Australia
- Presented by: Australian Institute of Architects
- First award: 2003; 23 years ago
- Currently held by: Allen, Jack and Cottier for Clubbe Hall at Frensham School, 2026

The National Award for Enduring Architecture is an Australian architecture prize presented annually by the Australian Institute of Architects (AIA) since 2003. The award recognises long lasting, innovative and culturally significant Australian architecture with usually more than 25 years passed since the completion of construction.

== Background ==
The Award for Enduring Architecture recognises achievement for the design of buildings of outstanding merit, which remain important as high quality works of architecture when considered in the contemporary context. Nominations for the award can be made by AIA members, non-members and non-architects, but they must provide adequate material and information supporting a nomination for consideration of the jury. The Award also provides opportunity to recognise buildings that were not previously submitted into the annual awards programs.

The Award was initially called the National 25 Year Award when it was established in 2003. In 2007 the award name was changed to the '25 Year Award for Enduring Architecture' later becoming the 'National Award for Enduring Architecture' in 2011. The American Institute of Architects has awarded a 25 Year Award annually since 1969. The ACT Chapter of the Australian Institute of Architects inaugurated the first '25 Year Award' for architecture in Australia in 1995.

The average age of the 23 projects awarded between 2003 and 2025 is 40 years.

== State awards for enduring architecture ==
The Australian Institute of Architects national awards jury selects a national winner each year from a shortlist made of up to eight selected state and territory 'enduring architecture projects' from the AIA local chapter awards including;

- Sir Roy Grounds Award for Enduring Architecture (Australian Capital Territory, started 1995)
- New South Wales Enduring Architecture Award (started 2003)
- Maggie Edmond Enduring Architecture Award (Victoria, started 2003)
- Robin Gibson Award for Enduring Architecture (Queensland, started 2003)
- Jack Cheesman Award for Enduring Architecture (South Australia, started 2005)
- Tasmania Award for Enduring Architecture (started 2010)
- Northern Territory Enduring Architecture Award (started 2013)
- Richard Roach Jewell Award for Enduring Architecture (Western Australia, started 2015)

Recipients of the state–based award are then eligible for consideration for the National Award for Enduring Architecture presented later in the same year, as part of the Australian National Architecture Awards.

== Inaugural award, Sydney Opera House, 2003 ==
In November 2003 arguably Australia's most well known building, the Sydney Opera House, designed by Danish architect Jørn Utzon was acknowledged with the inaugural National Award for Enduring Architecture (National 25 Year Award) shortly after the 30th anniversary of the building's official opening on 20 October 1973. This acknowledgement followed the awarding of the inaugural New South Wales Enduring Architecture Award to the Sydney Opera House in July 2003 at the New South Wales Chapter Awards.

″The 25 Year Award acknowledges the Sydney Opera House as an exemplar of the great contribution that architecture can make to a city and a nation.

Designed at the vast scale of Sydney Harbour itself, the Opera House established itself as a world icon of modern design long before 'iconic' buildings such as the Guggenheim in Bilbao were consciously conceived for their commercial effect.

The design has remained timeless and has stood the test of time – making no reference to the traditional forms associated with the public architecture of its time, dissolving wall into roof as one sculptural whole on a massive base. The grandeur, elegance and scale of the building restored the concept of the 'monument' as a socially acceptable expression in an age of neutral functionalism and, over time, and it has re-established the fundamental role of great architecture and public places in the making of contemporary Australian cities.

The building is also a reminder that the visions, timeframes and budgets of a particular historical moment cannot easily comprehend the ongoing significance of major individual public projects, or their ultimate commercial and social value to a city. Now more than 25 years after its completion, the Opera House is undergoing agreed modifications following a thoughtful and consultative process involving Jørn Utzon. From this alone, the Sydney Opera House, the NSW Government and the Australian community have benefited in re-establishing a relationship with the original architect.

With the assistance of the architectural profession, and the RAIA, and through the co-operation of the NSW Government and the Federal Government, it is hoped that the Sydney Opera House will be officially nominated for World Heritage Listing in 2004.″

— AIA National Jury Citation, 2003

The move to recognition followed a long period of reconciliation with Utzon and plans for new work and restoration of the Opera House. The award also assisted in the process for UNESCO World Heritage nomination, eventually confirmed in 2007.

== 2026 Award ==
In July 2026 three projects were shortlisted from state chapter awards for consideration of the national award: Adelaide High School by Edward B. Fitzgerald and John R. Brogan (SA), Clubbe Hall, Mittagong by AJC Architects (NSW) and Dorney House at Fort Nelson, Hobart by J.H. Esmond Dorney (Tasmania).

== List of National Award recipients ==
National Award for Enduring Architecture (reverse order)
Year	Architect	Project	Location	State	Year Built	Years Since	Other AIA/RAIA Awards
2026	Allen, Jack and Cottier	Clubbe Hall, Frensham School	Waverley Parade and Range Road, Mittagong	New South Wales	1966	60 years	Blacket Prize, 1966 (NSW); New South Wales Enduring Architecture Award, 2026
2025	Gregory Burgess	Uluṟu-Kata Tjuṯa Cultural Centre	Uluru Road, Uluṟu-Kata Tjuṯa National Park	Northern Territory	1995	30 years	Northern Territory Enduring Architecture Award, 2025; High Commendation, Sir Zelman Cowen Award for Public Architecture, 1995; Tracy Memorial Award, 1995 (NT); New Institutional Building Award, 1995 (NT); People’s Choice Award, 1995 (NT)
2024	Donovan Hill	C House	Coorparoo, Brisbane	Queensland	1998	26 years	Robin Gibson Award for Enduring Architecture, 2004
2023	Gregory Burgess	Brambuk: Living Cultural Centre (now National Parks and Cultural Centre)	277 Grampians Road, Halls Gap	Victoria	1990	33 years	Maggie Edmond Enduring Architecture Award, 2023; Sir Zelman Cowen Award for Public Architecture, 1990
2022	Ken Woolley	Woolley House (now Woolley Hesketh House)	34 Bullecourt Avenue, Mosman	New South Wales	1962	60 years	NSW Enduring Architecture Award, 2022; Wilkinson Award, 1962
2021	Kevin Borland, John and Phyllis Murphy and Peter McIntyre (with engineer Bill Irwin)	Swimming and Diving Stadium	Olympic Boulevard and Batman Avenue, Melbourne	Victoria	1956	63 years	Maggie Edmond Enduring Architecture Award, 2021; Building of the Year, 1956
2020	Richard Leplastrier	Palm Garden House	Bilgola Beach	New South Wales	1976	44 years	NSW Enduring Architecture Award, 2020
2019	Philip Cox & Partners	Ayers Rock Resort (now Sails in the Desert)	Yulara	Northern Territory	1984	35 years	Northern Territory Enduring Architecture Award, 2019; Sir Zelman Cowen Award for Public Architecture, 1985
2018	Hall, Phillips and Wilson Architects	Townsville Courts of Law Edmund Sheppard Building	31 Walker Street, Townsville	Queensland	1975	43 years	Robin Gibson Award for Enduring Architecture, 2018 (Qld)
2017	Aaron Bolot	17 Wylde Street Apartments	17 Wylde Street, Potts Point	New South Wales	1951	66 years	NSW Enduring Architecture Award, 2017
2016	Howlett and Bailey Architects	Perth Concert Hall	5 St Georges Terrace, Perth	Western Australia	1973	43 years	Richard Roach Jewell Award for Enduring Architecture, 2016 (WA)
2015	Howlett and Bailey Architects	Council House	27–29 St Georges Terrace, Perth	Western Australia	1963	52 years	Richard Roach Jewell Award for Enduring Architecture, 2015 (WA)
2014	Ian McKay and Philip Cox; Architects in Association	Tocal College (CB Alexander Campus)	815 Tocal Road, Paterson	New South Wales	1963	51 years	Blacket Prize, 1964 (NSW); NSW Enduring Architecture Award, 2014
2013	Mitchell Giurgola and Thorp	Australian Parliament House	Canberra	ACT	1988	25 years	Sir Roy Grounds Award for Enduring Architecture, 2013; Sir Zelman Cowen Award for Public Architecture, 1989; Canberra Medallion for Architectural Excellence, 1989
2012	Harry Seidler	Australia Square	264 George Street, Sydney	New South Wales	1967	45 years	NSW Award Enduring Architecture Award, 2012; Sir John Sulman Medal, 1968; RAIA Civic Design Award for a work of outstanding environmental design, 1968
2011	Glenn Murcutt	Magney House	Bingie Point	New South Wales	1984	27 years	NSW Enduring Architecture Award, 2011; Robin Boyd Award, 1985; Wilkinson Award, 1985
2010	Department of Public Works (Architect Peter Partridge)	Supreme Court Complex	Salamanca Place, Hobart	Tasmania	1975	35 years	Tasmania Award for Enduring Architecture, 2010
2009	Yuncken Freeman Brothers, Griffiths & Simpson; Gregory Burgess	Sidney Myer Music Bowl	Kings Domain, Melbourne	Victoria	1959	50 years	Maggie Edmond Enduring Architecture Award, 2009; Melbourne Prize, 2002
2008	Vivian Fraser in Association with NSW Government Architect	Wharf Theatre	Walsh Bay	New South Wales	1984	24 years	NSW Enduring Architecture Award, 2008'; President's Award for Recycled Buildings, 1985 (National Awards)
2007	Edwards Madigan Torzillo Briggs	High Court of Australia Building	Parkes Place, Parkes	ACT	1980	27 years	Sir Roy Grounds Award for Enduring Architecture, 2007
2006	Grounds, Romberg & Boyd	Robin Boyd House II (Walsh Street House)	290 Walsh Street, South Yarra	Victoria	1958	48 years	Maggie Edmond Enduring Architecture Award, 2006
2005	Yuncken Freeman	BHP House	140 William Street, Melbourne	Victoria	1972	32 years	Maggie Edmond Enduring Architecture Award, 2005; Award of Merit, 1973; Bronze Medal, 1975
2004	Glenn Murcutt	Kempsey Farmhouse (Marie Short House)	Kempsey	New South Wales	1974	30 years	NSW Enduring Architecture Award, 2004
2003	Jørn Utzon	Sydney Opera House including (Stage 2, Hall Todd & Littlemore	Sydney	New South Wales	1973	30 years	NSW Enduring Architecture Award, 2003; NSW Enduring Architecture Award, 2006 (Stage 2); RAIA Merit Award, 1974; RAIA Civic Design Award, 1980; RAIA Commemorative Award, Jørn Utzon – Sydney Opera House, 1992; NSW Architecture Medallion, 2023 (Renewal by Ashton Raggatt McDougall); Greenway Award for Heritage, 2023 (NSW); John Verge Award for Interior Architecture, 2023 (NSW); Emil Sodersten Award for Interior Architecture, 2023; Lachlan Macquarie Award for Heritage, 2023

== Gallery of awarded projects ==
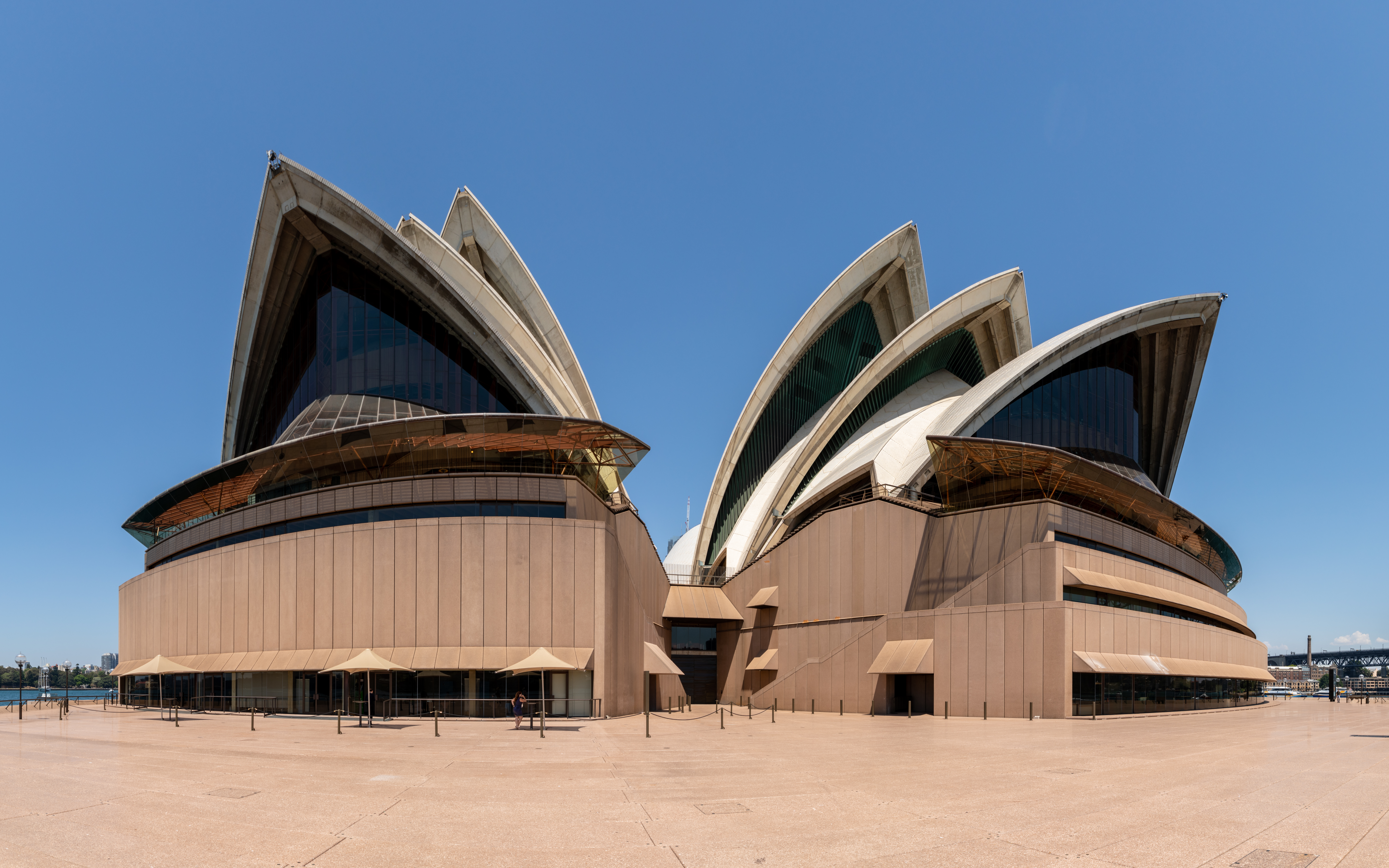
2003 Award, Sydney Opera House opened 1973

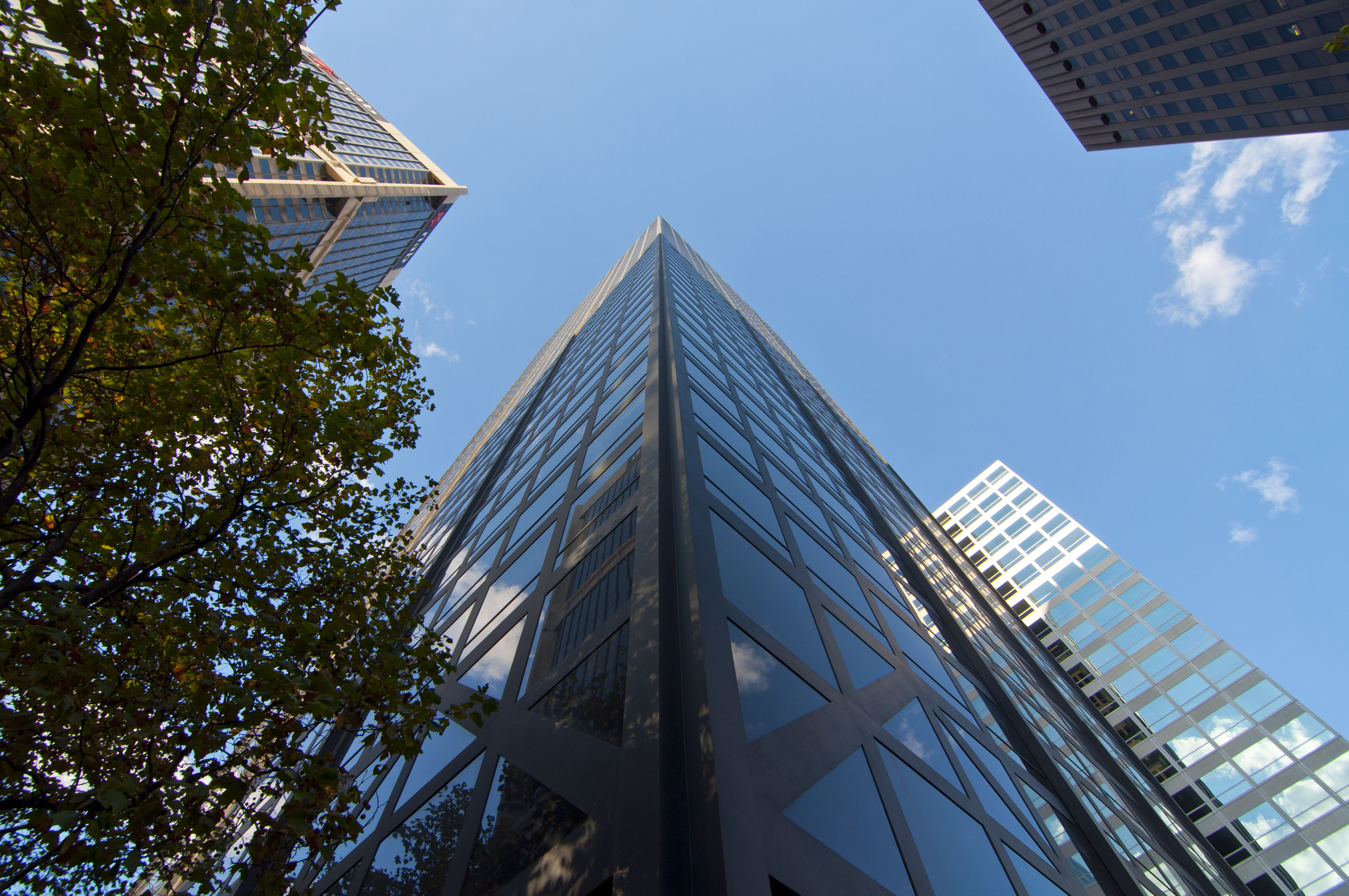
2005 Award, BHP House, Melbourne, completed 1972

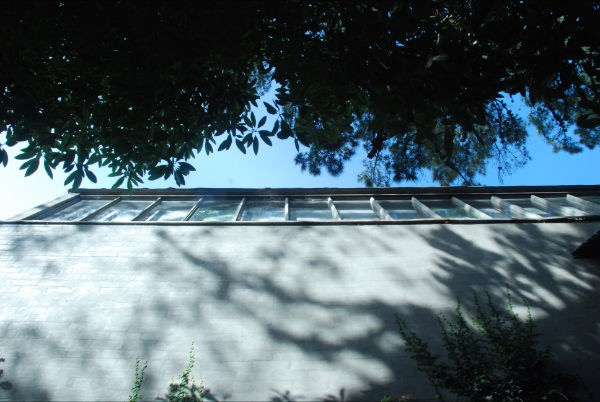
2006 Award, Walsh Street House, completed 1958

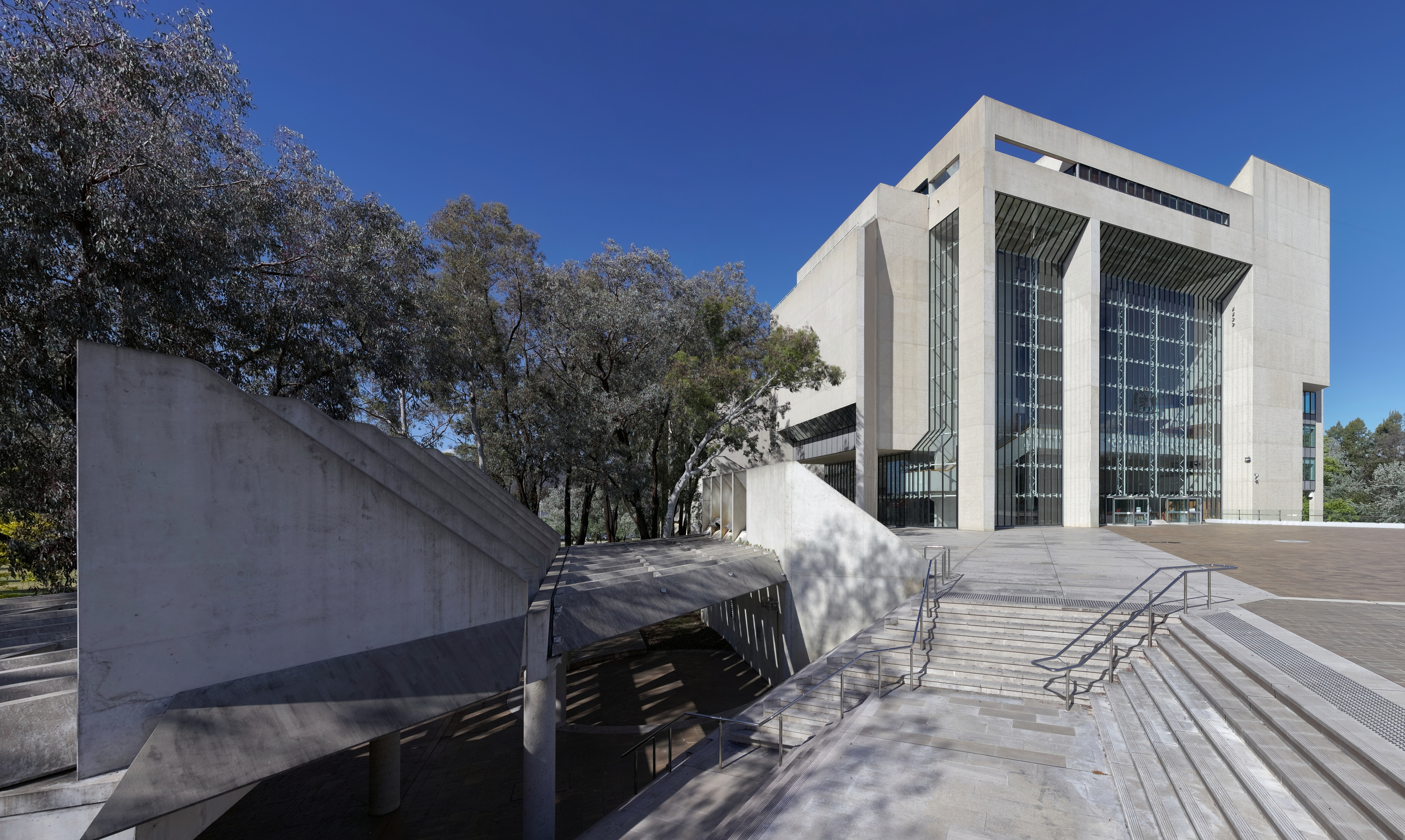
2007 Award, High Court of Australia, Canberra, opened 1980

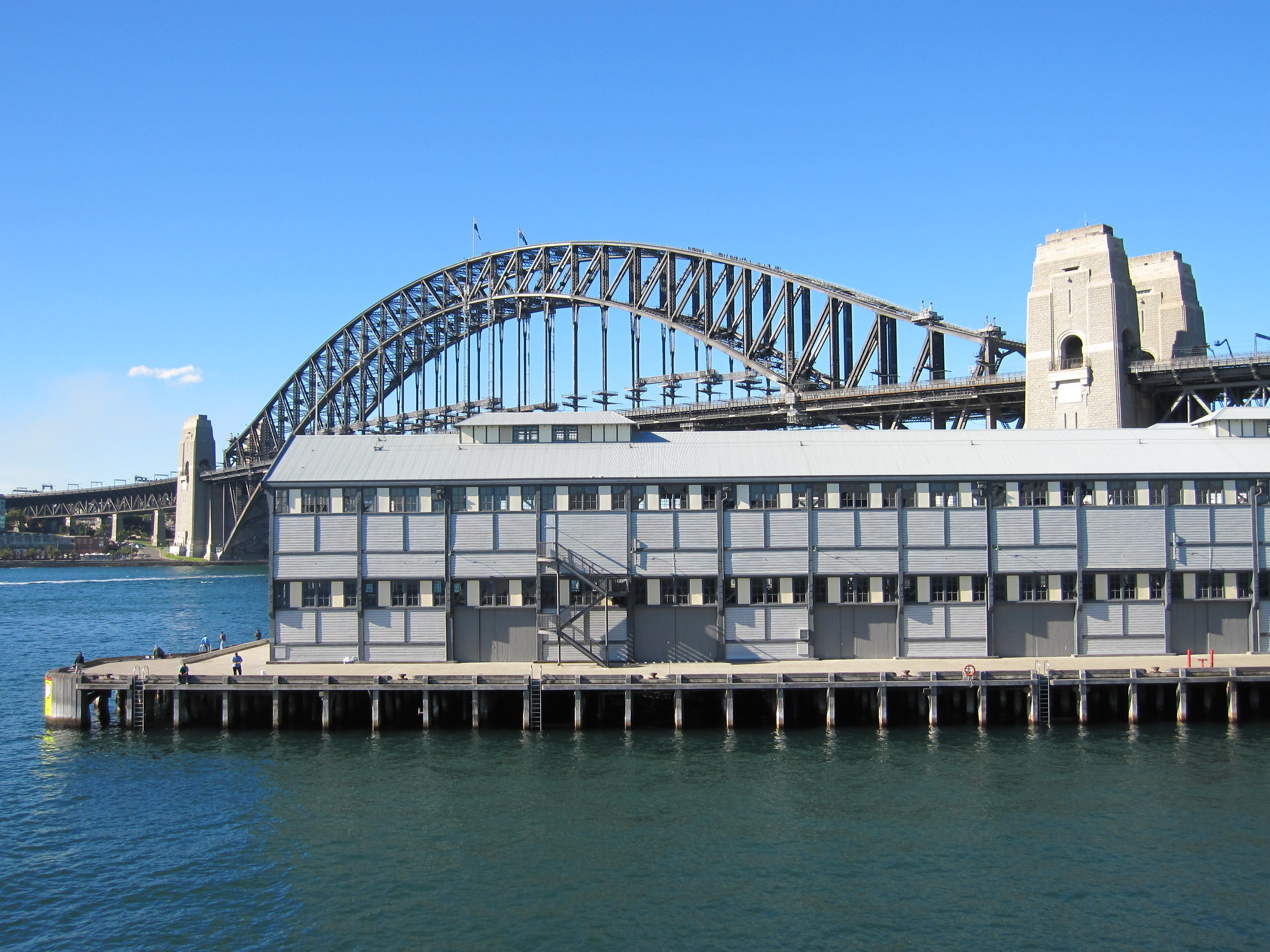
2008 Award, Wharf Theatre, opened 1984

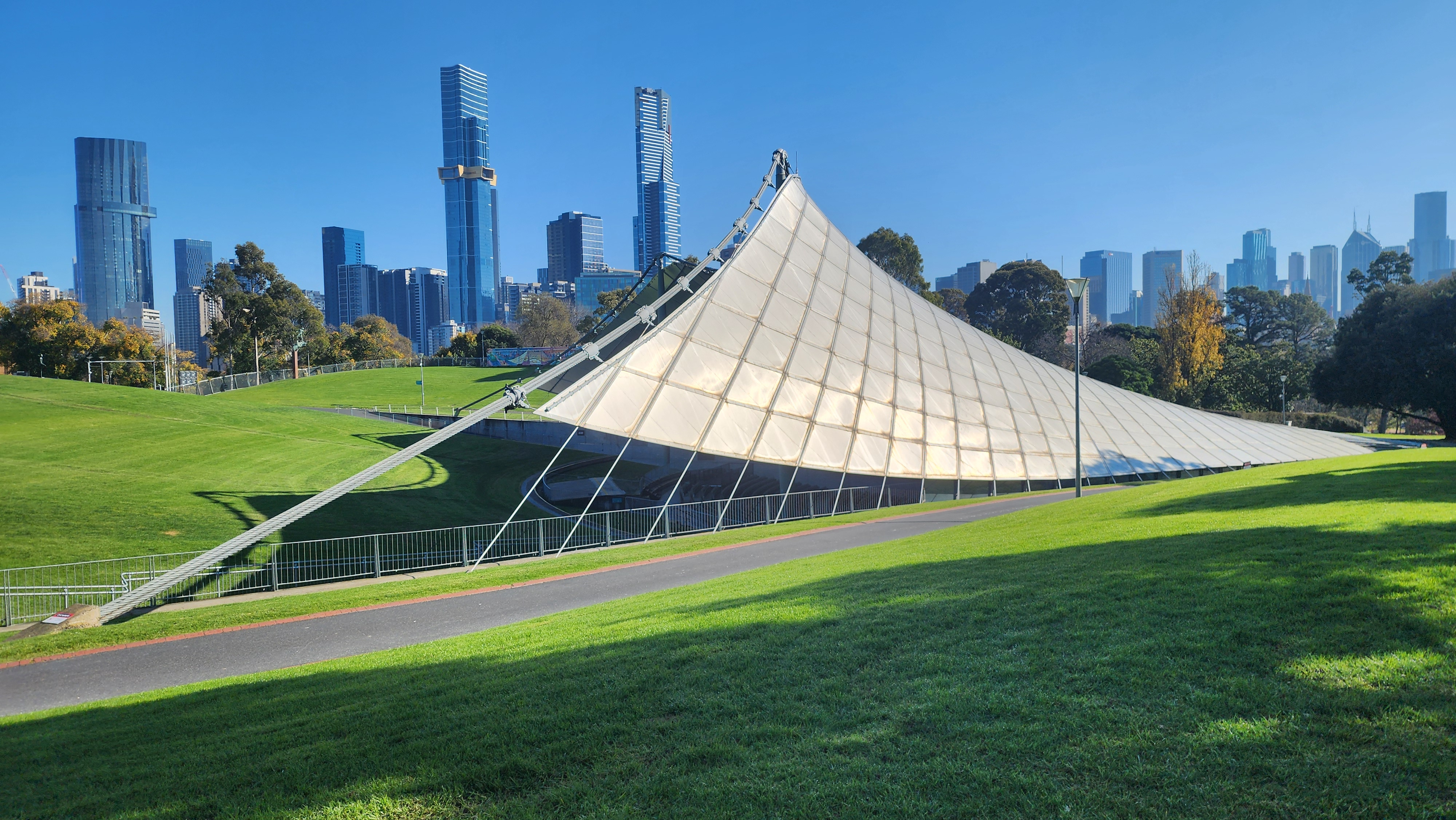
2009 Award, Sidney Myer Music Bowl, Melbourne, opened 1959

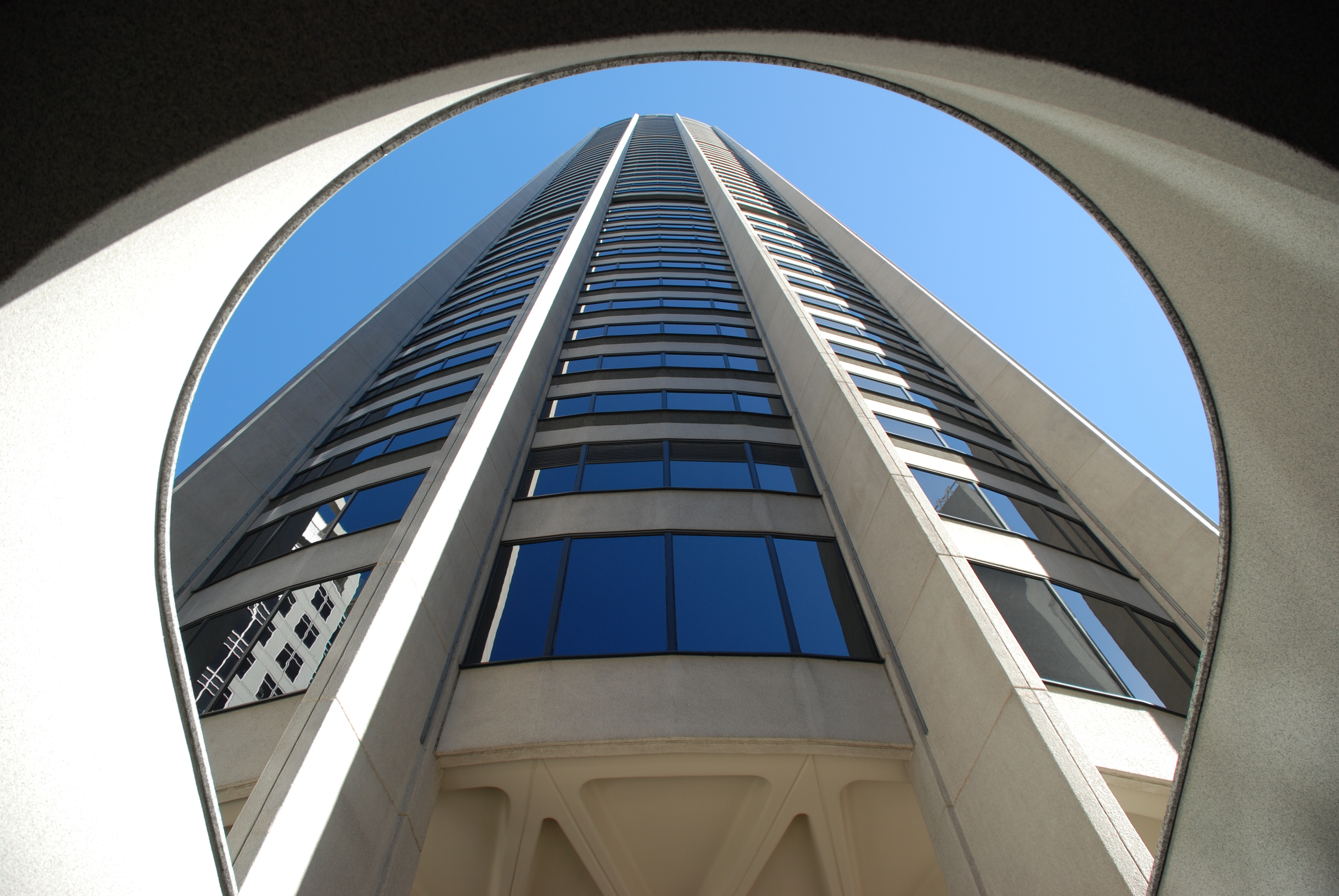
2012 Award, Australia Square, Sydney, completed 1967

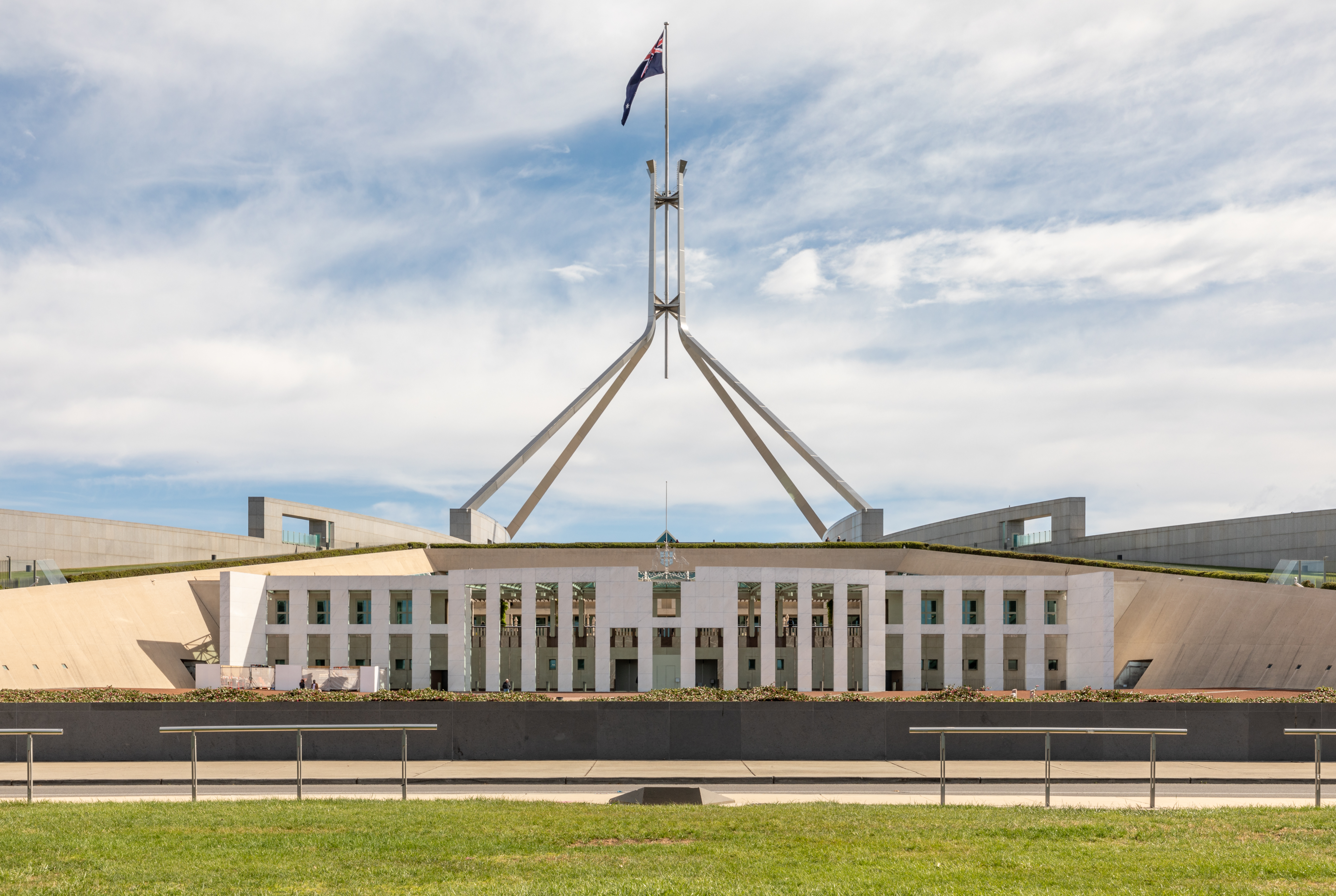
2013 Award, Australian Parliament House, Canberra, opened 1988

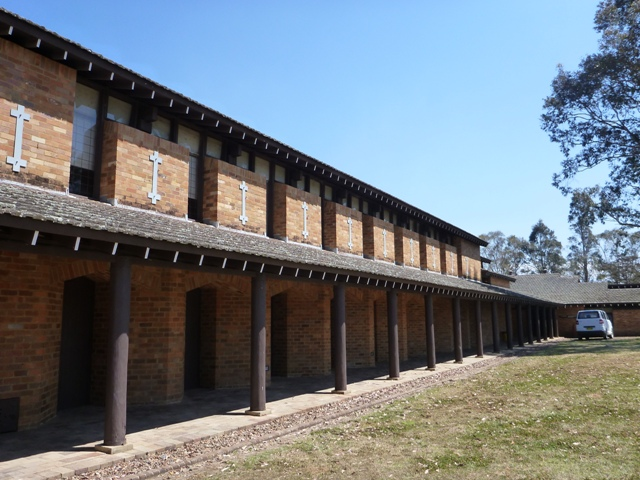
2014 Award, Tocal College, NSW, completed 1963

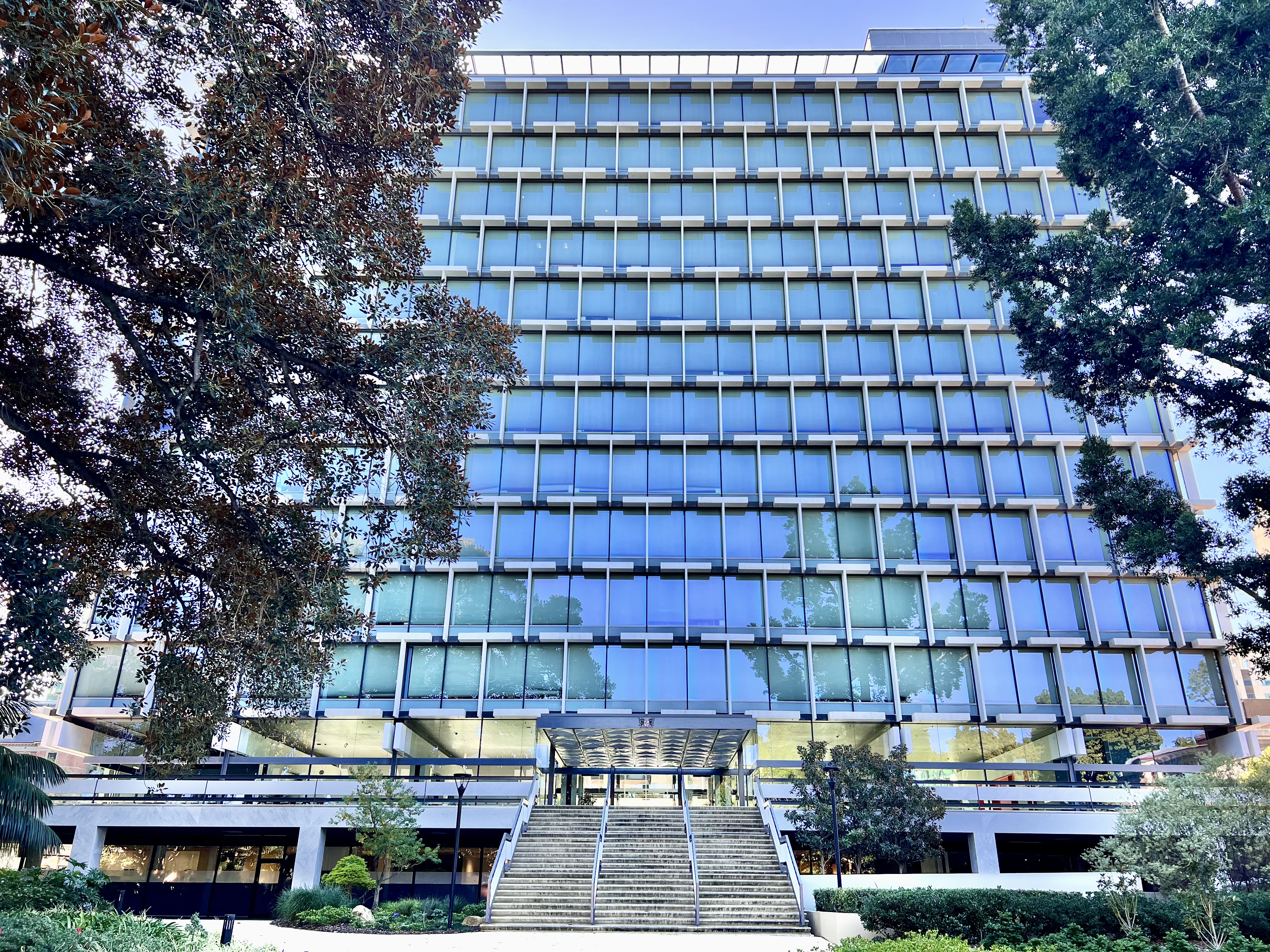
2015 Award, Council House, Perth, WA, completed 1963

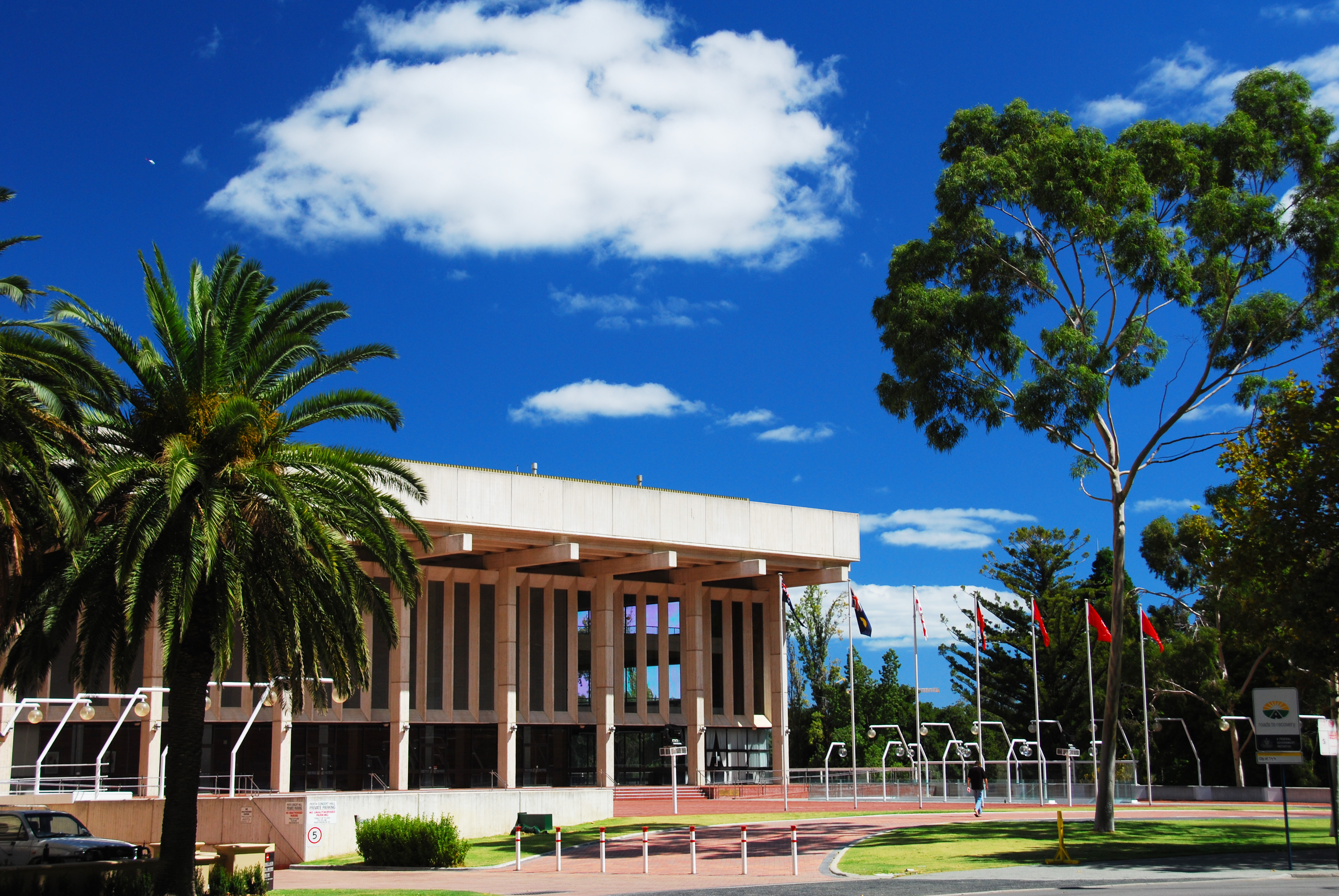
2016 Award, Perth Concert Hall, Perth, WA, completed 1973

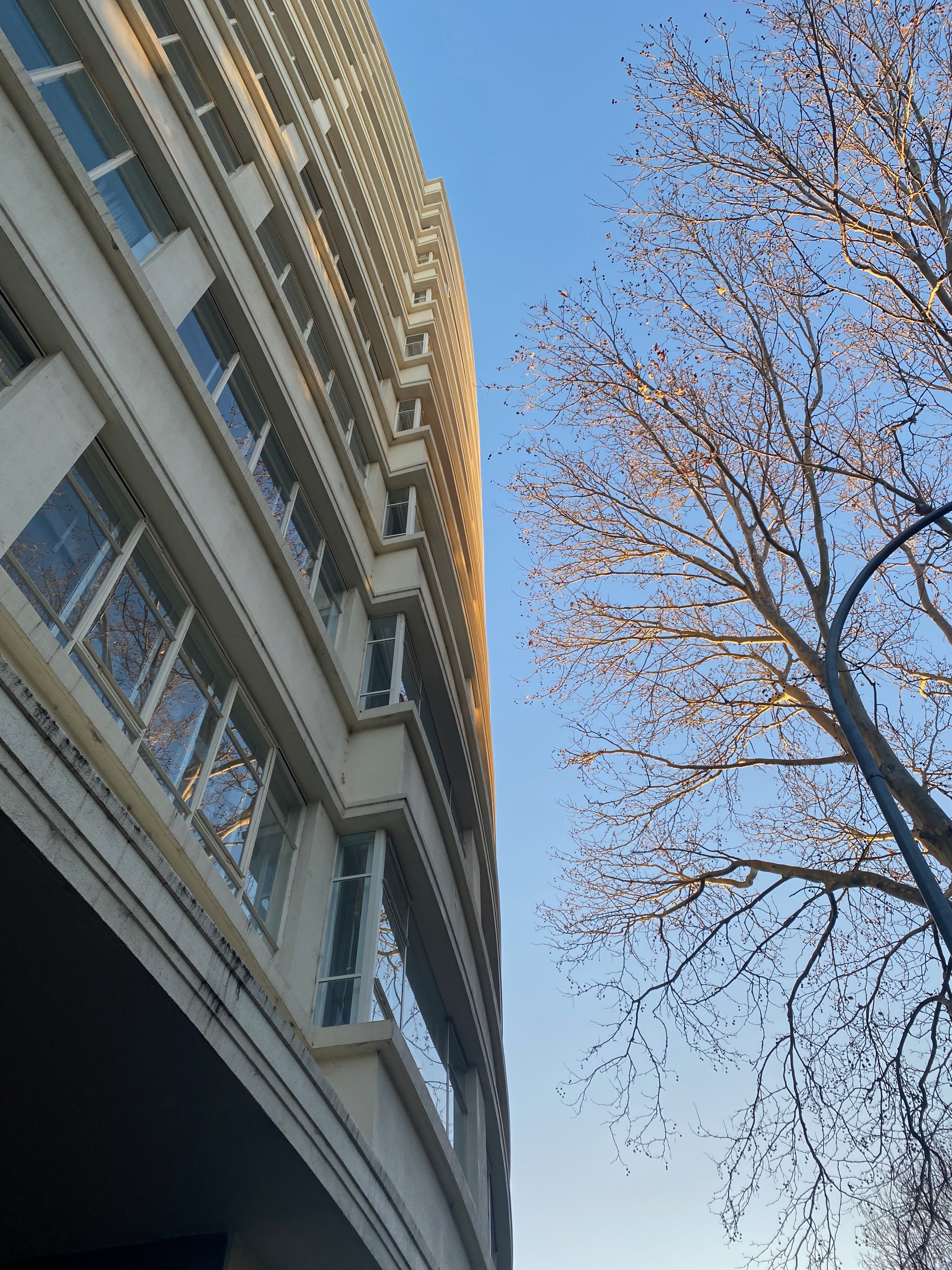
2017 Award, 17 Wylde Street Apartments, Sydney, NSW, completed 1951

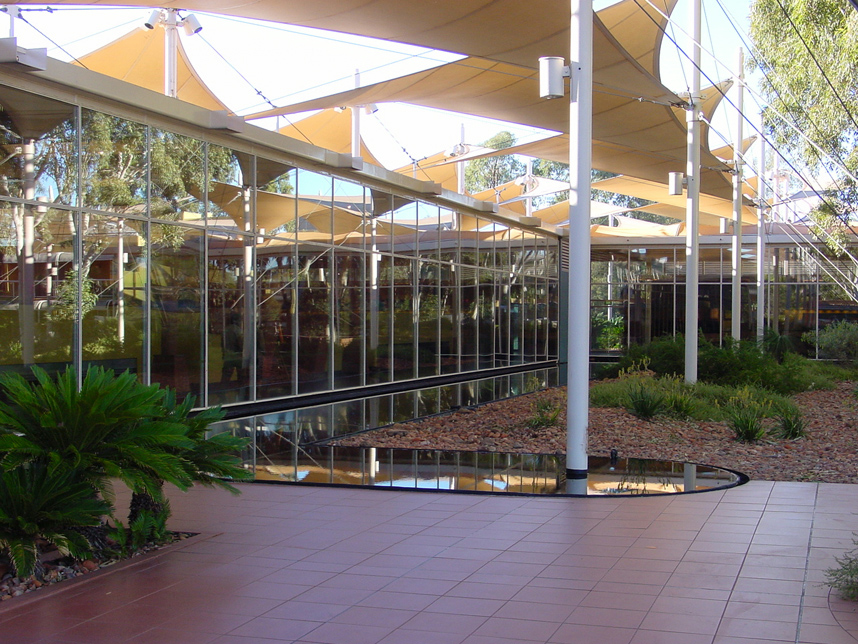
2019 Award, Ayers Rock Resort, Yulara, NT, completed 1984

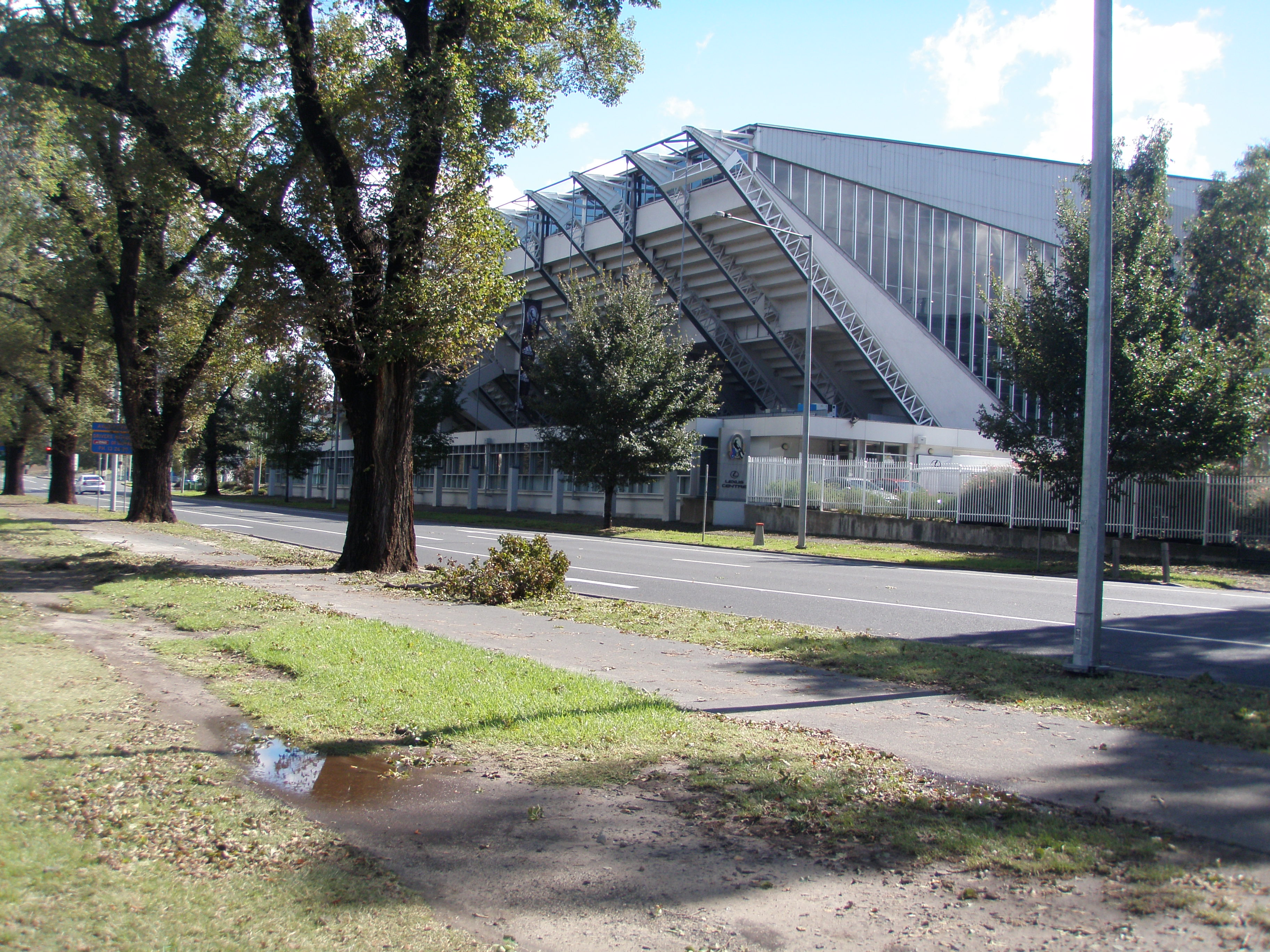
2020 Award, Melbourne Swimming and Diving Centre, completed 1956

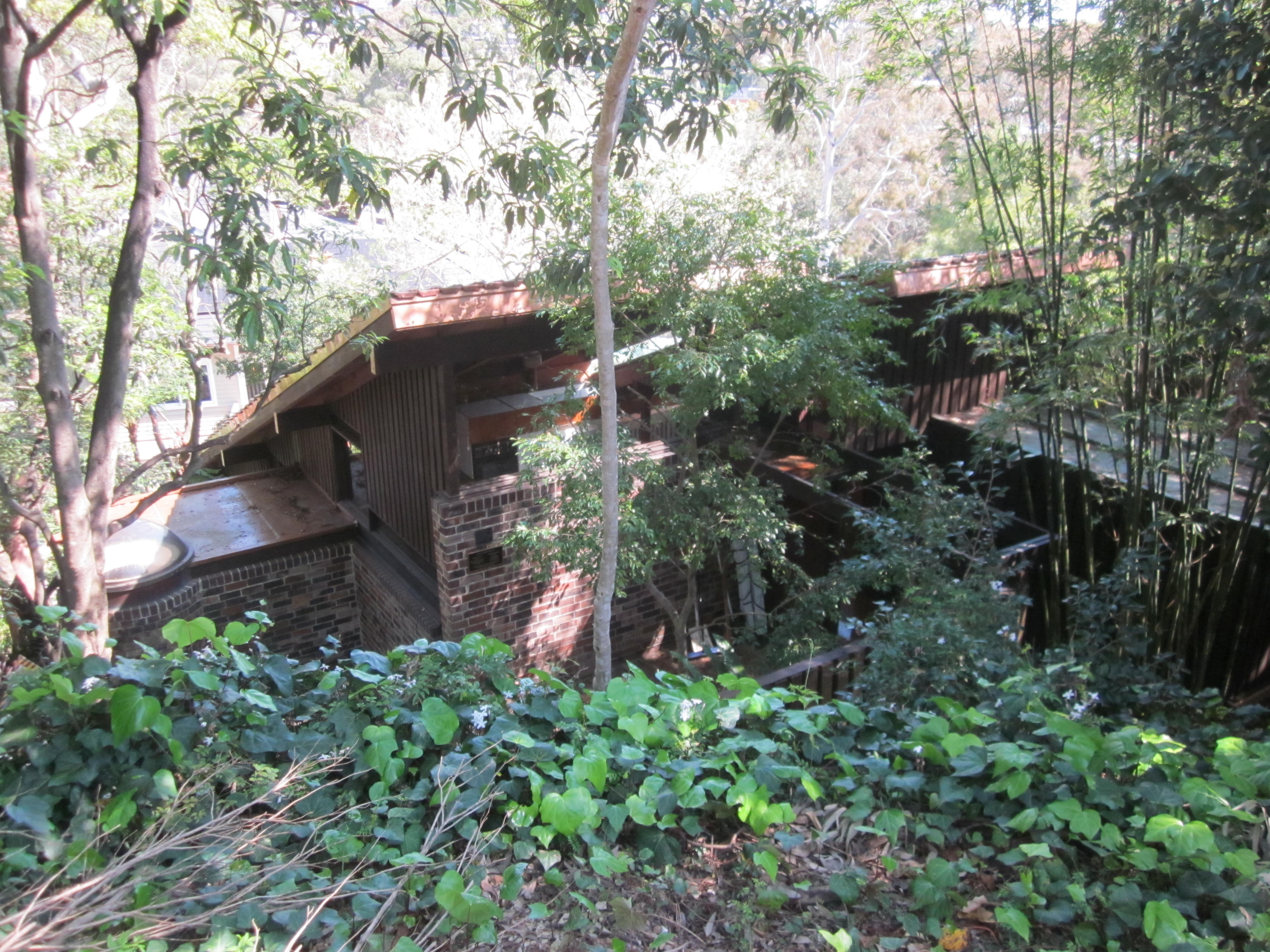
2022 Award, Woolley House, Mosman, NSW, completed 1962

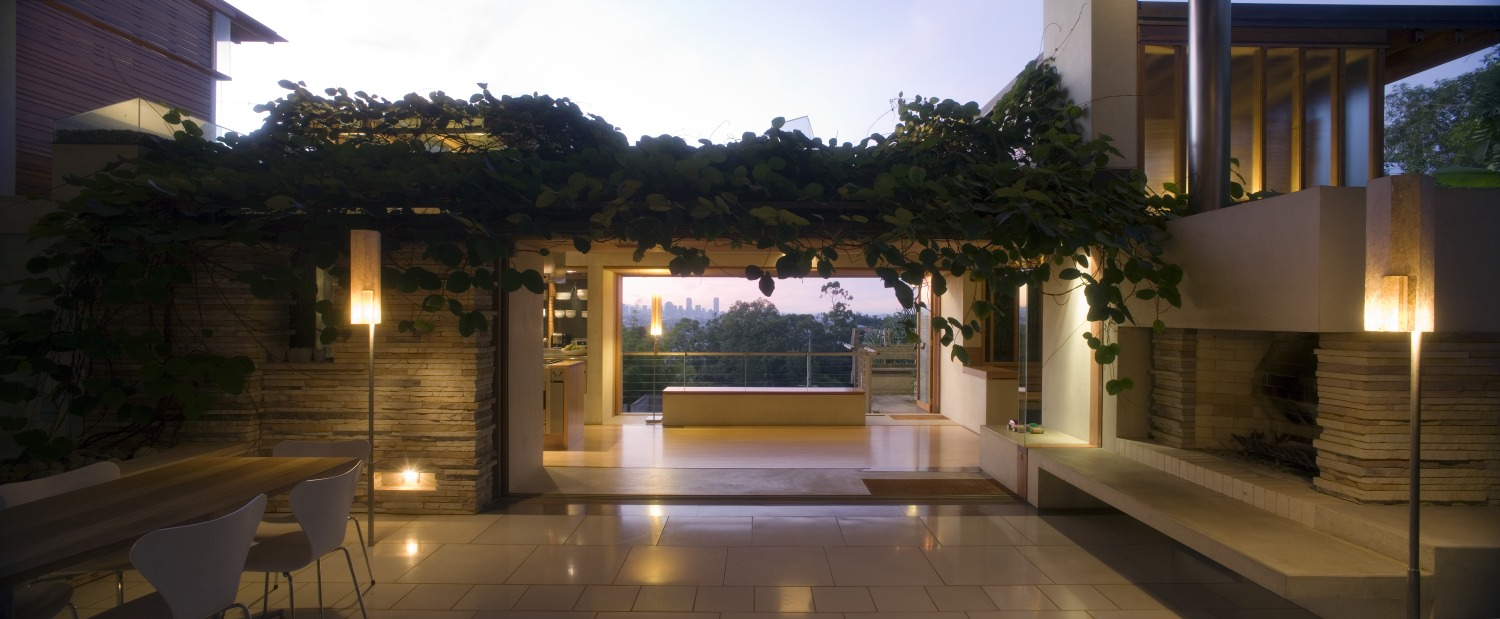
2024 Award, C House, Coorparoo, Brisbane, Queensland, completed 1998

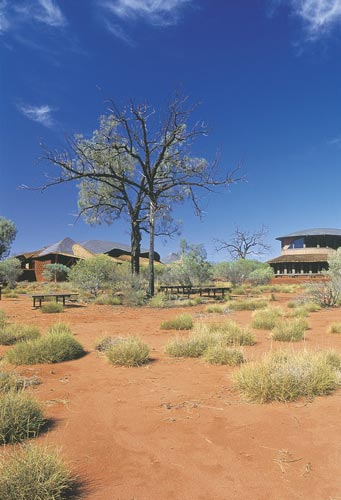
2025 Award, Uluṟu-Kata Tjuṯa Cultural Centre, completed 1995

== Distribution and location of awards ==
The average age of recognition of 24 projects awarded (2003—2026) is 41 years since completion of construction or opening. Projects located in New South Wales have dominated the Award, with 10 of the 24 awarded projects located there, five in Victoria, two in Canberra (Australian Capital Territory), Western Australia, Northern Territory and Queensland, and one in Tasmania. No projects from South Australia have been nationally recognised.

Enduring Architecture Awards by Australian state or territory, 2003—2026, by location of building (total 24 awards)
1. New South Wales (41.7%)
2. Victoria (20.8%)
3. Queensland (8.30%)
4. Tasmania (4.20%)
5. Western Australia (8.70%)
6. Northern Territory (8.30%)
7. South Australia (0.00%)
8. Australian Capital Territory (8.30%)

== See also ==
- Australian Institute of Architects
- Australian Institute of Architects Awards and Prizes
- Maggie Edmond Enduring Architecture Award
- New South Wales Enduring Architecture Award
- Northern Territory Enduring Architecture Award
- Jack Cheesman Award for Enduring Architecture
- Sir Zelman Cowen Award for Public Architecture
- 25 Year Award (USA)
