= Nick Murcutt =

Australian architect

- Born: Nicholas Phillip Murcutt; 5 June 1964; London, England
- Died: 18 March 2011 (aged 46); Sydney, Australia
- Education: University of Sydney
- Occupation: Architect
- Spouse: Rachel Neeson
- Parent(s): Glenn Murcutt, Helen Murcutt
- Awards: 2007 Wilkinson Award; 2009 Wilkinson Award; 2011 Robin Boyd Award; 2014 Sir John Sulman Medal; 2014 Lloyd Rees Award for Urban Design
- Practice: Neeson Murcutt
- Buildings: Prince Alfred Park Pool, Castlecrag House, Whale Beach House, Five Dock House, Olympic Park Amenities

Nicholas Phillip Murcutt (5 June 1964 – 18 March 2011) was an Australian architect.

== Career ==
Murcutt received his Architecture degree from the University of Sydney in 1989 and became a registered architect in 1990. He worked in several architectural firms including Terry Dorrough, Sydney 1984–1987 and after graduating Forward Consultants, Tasmania 1990–1991. In 1994 he then began work as an architectural tutor at the University of NSW, the University of Technology, Sydney, and the University of Sydney.

In 1994, Murcutt worked collaboratively with Neil Durbach and Camilla Block of Durbach Block Architects to form Durbach Block Murcutt, in which they received positive reviews for their amenities blocks for the Sydney Olympics.

In 2004, Murcutt along with his partner of 16 years Rachel Neeson began Neeson Murcutt Architects, also known as NMA; a combination of their individual practices. This practise is based in Sydney, Australia and most of their work is located in the state of New South Wales. In 2009, Murcutt and Neeson won the Wilkinson Award; an award for residential architecture presented by the Australian Institute of Architects, for the second time with the Whale Beach House.

== Personal life ==
Nick Murcutt was born on 5 June 1964 in London, England. He is the son of Helen Murcutt and famous Australian architect Glenn Murcutt.

Murcutt died on 18 March 2011, aged 46, at his family home, nine-months after being diagnosed with lung cancer.

== Built works ==
Nick Murcutt

- 2000 Collopy House
- 1999 Box House
- 1998 Birrell House
- 1997 Amenities Block at Bethlehem Ladies College with Rachel Neeson Design
- 1997 Saady alteration and addition
- 1996 Cook Gymea House
- 1996 Coffey alteration and addition
- 1995 Lake Longueville House
- 1994 Young House

With Durbach Block

- 1998 Amenities buildings at Olympic Park

With Neeson Murcutt Architects

- 2011 Prince Alfred Park Pool and Park Upgrade
- 2009 Zac's House
- 2009 Castlecrag House
- 2009 Woolwich House
- 2007 Whale Beach House
- 2007 North Avoca House
- 2006 The Beresford
- 2006 Five Dock House
- 2005 Pindimar House
- 2005 Birchgrove House addition and alteration
- 2002 Woollahra House addition and alteration

== Awards and honours ==
Nick Murcutt

- 2000 Architecture Australia National Award for Open Residential with Collopy house

With Durbach Block

- 1997 Wilkinson Award for housing with Foster Street Penthouse (Droga) apartments

With Neeson Murcutt Architects

- 2005 Table Bed Tent exhibited at the Canberra Biennial
- 2005 Shipwreck Lookout exhibited at the AAA Young Architects Exhibition
- 2006 Shipwreck Lookout exhibited at the Venice Biennale
- 2006 RAIA NSW Chapter commendation for Shipwreck Lookout
- 2007 Wilkinson Award for Five Dock House
- 2007 Winner of Think Brick competition
- 2008 RAIA NSW Chapter Architecture Award for North Avoca House
- 2008 Representation at Venice Biennale
- 2009 Wilkinson Award for Whale Beach House
- 2009 National Architecture Award for Residential Architecture for Whale Beach House
- 2009 National Architecture Award for Residential Architecture for Zac's House
- 2009 RAIA Victoria Chapter Architecture Award for Zac's House
- 2009 Shipwreck Lookout exhibited at the Sunburnt Exhibition at RMIT
- 2011 Robin Boyd Award for Castlecrag House
- 2014 Sir John Sulman Medal for Public Architecture for Prince Alfred Park Pool and Park Upgrade
- 2014 Lloyd Rees Award for Urban Design for Prince Alfred Park Pool and Park Upgrade
- 2014 City of Sydney Lord Mayor’s Prize for Prince Alfred Park Pool and Park Upgrade
- 2014 National Award for Public Architecture for Prince Alfred Park Pool and Park Upgrade
