= Troppo Architects =

Australian architectural practice

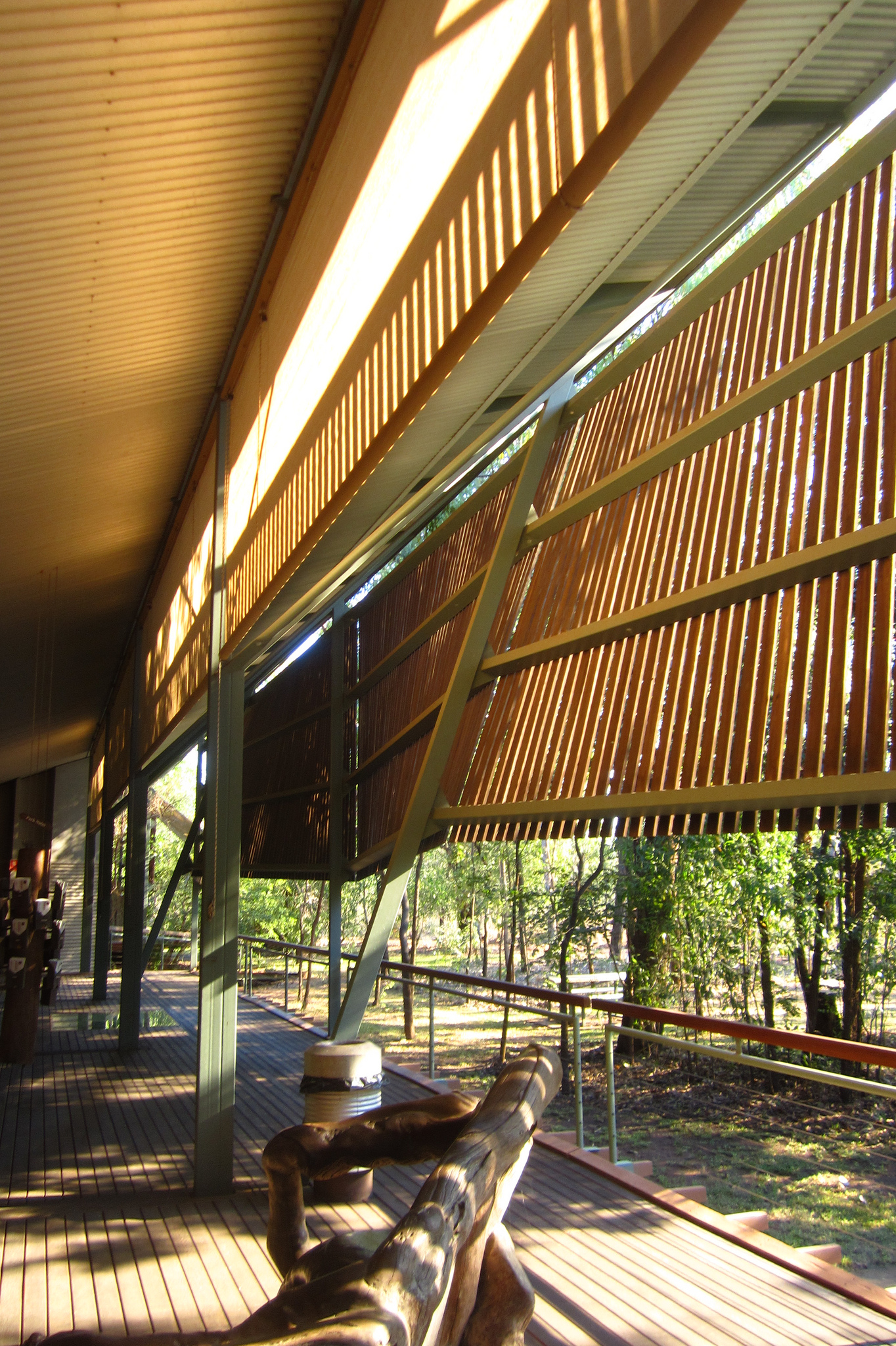

Practice information
- Partners: Phil Harris (Adelaide); Cary Duffield (Adelaide); Adrian Welke (Perth); Jo Best (Darwin); Sue Harper (Byron Bay); Greg Norman (Sydney); Geoff Clark (Launceston)
- Founders: Phil Harris & Adrian Welke (Darwin)
- Founded: 1980
- Location: Adelaide, Byron Bay, Darwin, Launceston, Perth, Sydney

Significant works and honors
- Buildings: Bowali Visitor Centre, Kakadu National Park; Lavarack Barracks, Townsville; Thiel House, Darwin; Troppoville, Darwin
- Projects: Tropology for Defence Housing Australia, Darwin
- Awards: Australian Institute of Architects Gold Medal 2014, Tracy Memorial Award 1992, 1993, 1994, 1998, 1999, 2011, 2014 & 2016, Robin Boyd Award 1993 & 2002, Sir Zelman Cowen Award for Public Architecture 1994, Frederick Romberg Award 2017, Northern Territory Enduring Architecture Award 2014 & 2018

Website
- troppo.com.au

Troppo Architects is an Australian architectural practice with the aim of promoting good tropical architecture in Australia's Top End. The practice was founded in 1980 in Darwin with the aid of a Northern Territory grant to examine the history of the region's architecture.

The practice has established offices in six Australian locations (Darwin, Adelaide, Fremantle, Launceston, Sydney and Byron Bay) and has completed projects in Africa, Asia and the Pacific. "It has a reputation for spare intelligent architecture that has evolved out of the architects' feeling for tradition and landscape. Not least, their buildings are designed for the climate."

== History ==
In the late 1970s, Phil Harris and Adrian Welke were two young Adelaide-raised Bachelor of Architecture students. In 1978, their final year of undergraduate study, they collaborated on the publication of "Influences in Regional Architecture", Australia's first history of architecture outside the urban arena.

Troppo Architects was founded in 1980 by Harris and Welke, whose early careers had taken them to Darwin. The practice commenced with the aid of an NT Government history grant to research (and eventually define and publicise) the History of Tropical Housing in Australia's Top End. The practice had a slow start, but gained momentum when they were successful in a Low Cost House Competition organised by the City of Darwin, and they were engaged to build a prototype of their design. The prototype was economical to build, climatically comfortable to live in, easy to extend, and also uses little energy. In its first decade, the practice refined and extended its skill in addressing the architectural requirements of the "Top End", gaining a wide range of work, including with remote aboriginal communities. Their approach has been applied to projects in: the Kimberley, Perth, Esperance, and inland WA; Adelaide, coastal, rural and far-northern SA; Melbourne and Victoria; Alice Springs and the centre; Townsville, and north and far north Queensland; and most recently, inland and north-coast NSW.

In 1987, the practice was selected by the Gagudju Community, administrators of the Kakadu National Park, to design some park facilities. Joining with Glenn Murcutt, the collaboration was (to quote Murcutt) "highly productive". The work lead to international critical acclaim, and a number of important commissions. The practice spread out across Australia: Phil Harris opened an office in Adelaide in 1999, and Adrian Welke opened an office Perth, leaving the original office in the hands of Dan Connolly.

In 2010, Troppo was run by five partners spread out across Australia: Greg MacNamara (Darwin), Geoff Clark (Launceston), Terry O'toole (Queensland: Brisbane & Townsville), Phil Harris (Adelaide), Adrian Welke (Perth) and Dan Connolly (Byron Bay). They work with a team of around twenty people and regularly collaborate with well-known architects such as Danny Wong, Glenn Murcutt, Phil Tait and Shane Thompson.

== Directors ==
Troppo's founding directors are Phil Harris (Adelaide) and Adrian Welke (Perth). Other directors are Jo Best (Darwin), Cary Duffield (Adelaide), Greg Norman (Sydney), Geoff Clark (Launceston) and Sue Harper (Byron Bay).

Former directors include Greg McNamara, Lena Yali, Richard Layton, Fiona Hogg and Terry O'Toole.

== Selected projects ==
Project	Awards
Commonwealth Defence Housing Authority, Larrakeyah Housing Precinct 2, Larrakeyah, Darwin, 1993	RAIA Robin Boyd Award, 1993
Top End Hotel, Darwin, 1998	RAIA (NT) President's Award for Recycled Buildings, 1999
PeeWee's Restaurant, 1997	RAIA (NT) Tracy Memorial Award, 1998; RAIA Award for Commercial Buildings, 1998
Bowali Visitor Centre, Kakadu National Park, 1993 (in association with Glenn Murcutt + Assoc)	RAIA Sir Zelman Cowen Award for Public Architecture, 1994; RAIA (NT) People's Choice Award, 1994; RAIA (NT) Tracy Memorial Award, 1994; AIA Northern Territory Enduring Architecture Award, 2018; Metal Building Award, 1994-5 (National Award by BHP/ Metal Building Products Manuf. Assoc.)
Lavarack Barracks, Townsville, 2000 (in association with Bligh Voller Nield)	RAIA Robin Boyd Award, 2002; RAIA (Qld) Robin Dods Award, 2002; RAIA (Qld) Sustainable Architecture Award, 2002
Thiel House, Darwin, 1998	RAIA (NT) Tracy Memorial Award, 1999; RAIA (NT) Burnett Award, 1999; Commendation, RAIA Robin Boyd Award, 1999
Rozak House, Darwin, 2000–2001	RAIA Sustainable Architecture Award, 2002; RAIA (NT) Sustainable Architecture Award, 2002; RAIA (NT) Burnett Award, 2002; Commendation, RAIA Robin Boyd Award, 2002; MBA National Environment and Energy Award, 2003
St Mary's Primary School, Darwin, 2010; Hall, Library, Early Learning Centre & Courtyard,	AIA (NT) Colorbond Steel Award, 2011; AIA (NT) Tracy Award, 2011; AIA (NT) Urban Design Award, 2011
Tropology for Defence Housing Australia, Darwin, 2017	AIA Frederick Romberg Award for Residential Architecture, Multiple Housing, 2017; AIA (NT) Architecture Award, Multiple Housing, 2017

== Awards ==
Troppo is nationally and internationally recognised, and is Australia's third most awarded practice. A full list of the details of awards can be found on the practice's website.

In addition to those mentioned above, they include:

- 1992 Royal Australian Institute of Architects (RAIA) (NT) Tracy Memorial Award for Works in Kakadu for ANPWS
- 1992 RAIA Special Jury Award for architecture in Northern Australia
- 1993 RAIA Robin Boyd Award for Medium Density Precinct 2, Larrakeyah, for Defence Housing Australia (DHA)
- 2010 Global Award for Sustainable Architecture, Paris
- 2014 Australian Institute of Architects Gold Medal awarded to Adrian Welke and Phil Harris

Summary of AIA/RAIA awards

Institute	Award	Year
AIA/RAIA(NT)	Architectural Innovation Award	1992 (twice)
AIA/RAIA(NT)	Burnett Award	1995, 1998, 1999, 2002, 2011
AIA/RAIA(NT)	Colorbond Steel Award	2011
AIA/RAIA(NT)	Multiple Housing Award	2009
AIA/RAIA(NT)	People's Choice Award	1994, 1995, 2009
AIA/RAIA(NT)	President's Award for Recycled Buildings	1992, 1994, 1999
AIA/RAIA(NT)	Public Architecture Award	2008
AIA/RAIA(NT)	Sustainable Architecture Award	2002
AIA/RAIA(NT)	Tracy Memorial Award	1992, 1993, 1994, 1998, 1999, 2011, 2014, 2016
AIA/RAIA(NT)	Urban Design Award	2008, 2011
AIA/RAIA(NT)	Northern Territory Enduring Architecture Award	2018
AIA/RAIA (North Qld)	NQ House of the Year	2010
AIA/RAIA (Qld)	Colorbond Award	2001
AIA/RAIA (SA)	Colorbond Steel Award	2010
AIA/RAIA (SA)	John S Chappel Award for Residential Architecture, Houses (New)	2009
National AIA/RAIA	Special Jury Award	1992
National AIA/RAIA	Robin Boyd Award	1993, 2002
National AIA/RAIA	Sir Zelman Cowen Award for Public Architecture	1994
National AIA/RAIA	Award for Commercial Buildings	1998
National AIA/RAIA	Sustainable Architecture Award	2002
National AIA/RAIA	Frederick Romberg Award for Residential Architecture, Multiple Housing	2017

Summary of non-AIA/RAIA awards

- Adelaide Affordable Ecohousing Competition, winner, 2004
- Arafura Medium Density Residential Design Competition, winner, 2006
- Global Award for Sustainable Architecture, Paris, 2010
- HIA (SA) Custom Built Homes Award, 2003
- MBA Building Excellence Award, 2003
- MBA National Environment and Energy Award, 2003
- Metal Building Award, 1994-5 (National Award by BHP / Metal Building Products Manuf. Assoc. for Bowali Visitor Centre, Kakadu National Park)
- Northern Rivers Urban Design Awards, Award for Excellence, 2008
- Northern Rivers Urban Design Awards, Grand Winner, 2008
- Tel Aviv University Visitor Centre & School of Environmental Studies, International competition winner, 2002
- Thuringowa City Council's Climate Responsive Design Competition, winner, 2003
- Timber Design Awards, SA, 2010
- Tropical House Design Comp, Winner, Darwin, June 1990

== Sources ==
- Goad, Philip (1999/2005) Troppo Architects, Pesaro Publishing. ISBN 0 9577560 1 1
