= Glenn Murcutt =

Australian architect (born 1936)

Glenn Murcutt AO
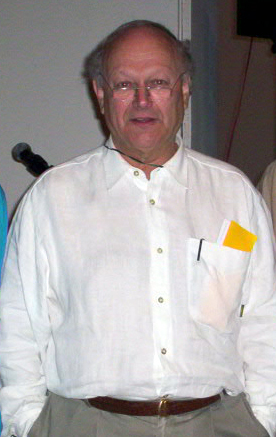
- Glenn Murcutt in 2004
- Born: 25 July 1936 (age 90); London, England
- Education: Sydney Technical College
- Occupation: Architect
- Years active: 1961—
- Partner: Wendy Lewin (m.1997)
- Children: Nick Murcutt, Daniel Murcutt
- Parent(s): Daphne Powy, Arthur Murcutt
- Awards: Robin Boyd Award (1981, 1985); Wilkinson Award (1976, 1979, 1982, 1984, 1985, 1995); RAIA Gold Medal (1992); National Award for Enduring Architecture (2004, 2011); Alvar Aalto Medal (1992); Pritzker Architecture Prize (2002); American Institute of Architects Gold Medal (2009); Praemium Imperiale (2021)
- Buildings: Marie Short House (Kempsey Farmhouse) (1975), Fredericks House (1982), Ball-Eastaway House (1983), Magney House (1984), Marika-Alderton House (1994), Arthur and Yvonne Boyd Education Centre (1999), Australian Islamic Centre (2016), Cobar Sound Chapel (2022)

Glenn Marcus Murcutt AO (born 25 July 1936) is an Australian architect. He has been the recipient of the 1992 Alvar Aalto Medal, the 2002 Pritzker Architecture Prize, the 2009 American Institute of Architects Gold Medal and the 2021 Praemium Imperiale. Glenn Murcutt works as a sole practitioner without staff, builds only within Australia and is known to be very selective with his projects. Being the only Australian winner of the prestigious Pritzker Prize, he is often referred to as Australia's most famous architect.

== Life ==
Murcutt was born on 25 July 1936 in London to Australian parents. He spent the first five years of his life in the Morobe Province of Papua New Guinea, where he first encountered vernacular architecture. After moving to Sydney with his parents in 1941, he was educated at Manly Boys' High School and studied architecture at the Sydney Technical College, from which he graduated in 1961. Murcutt's early work experience was with various architects, such as Neville Gruzman, Ken Woolley, Sydney Ancher and Bryce Mortlock, which exposed him to their style of organic architecture focussing on relationships to nature. By 1969, Murcutt established his own practice in the Sydney suburb of Mosman.

Murcutt works as a sole practitioner, producing residential and institutional work all over Australia. Although he does not work outside the country or run a large firm, his work has a worldwide influence, especially since Murcutt teaches master classes for beginning and established architects.

Murcutt's motto, 'touch the earth lightly', leads him to design his works to fit into the Australian landscape features. His works are highly economical and multi-functional. Murcutt also pays attention to aspects of the environment such as wind direction, water movement, temperature and light surrounding his sites before he designs the building itself. Materials such as glass, stone, timber, concrete, steel and corrugated iron are often included in his works.

Testament to his influence internationally was the award of the 2002 Pritzker Architecture Prize, one of the highest distinctions in architecture. In the words of the Pritzker jury: "In an age obsessed with celebrity, the glitz of our 'starchitects', backed by large staffs and copious public relations support, dominates the headlines. As a total contrast, Murcutt works in a one-person office on the other side of the world ... yet has a waiting list of clients, so intent is he to give each project his personal best. He is an innovative architectural technician who is capable of turning his sensitivity to the environment and to locality into forthright, totally honest, non-showy works of art." In 2009 Murcutt won the American Institute of Architects Gold Medal.

Murcutt currently lectures and teaches architectural studies as a professor at the UNSW Faculty of Built Environment.

One of Murcutt's most recent projects is a mosque, the Australian Islamic Centre, in the Melbourne suburb of Newport. In 2016, the mosque became the focus of a critically acclaimed documentary, “Glenn Murcutt: Spirit of Place”, by renowned filmmaker Catherine Hunter. The film documents the growing acceptance of Murcutt's strikingly contemporary design, weaving into the narrative the stories of his famous domestic commissions, interviews with those involved, and an intimate biography of his life. Hunter has said about Murcutt: "He gives everything, he can’t help himself. He’s unstoppable, he’s this force. Long before we started talking about things such as sustainability, Glenn was practicing those things."

Glenn Murcutt's latest completed project is a new permanent sound installation space, the Cobar Sound Chapel in Cobar NSW, together with composer Georges Lentz. It was officially opened on April 2, 2022.

A portrait of Murcutt by Fiona Lowry was a finalist in the 2022 Archibald Prize.

Murcutt's son Nicholas (1964–2011) was also a practicing architect.

== Projects ==
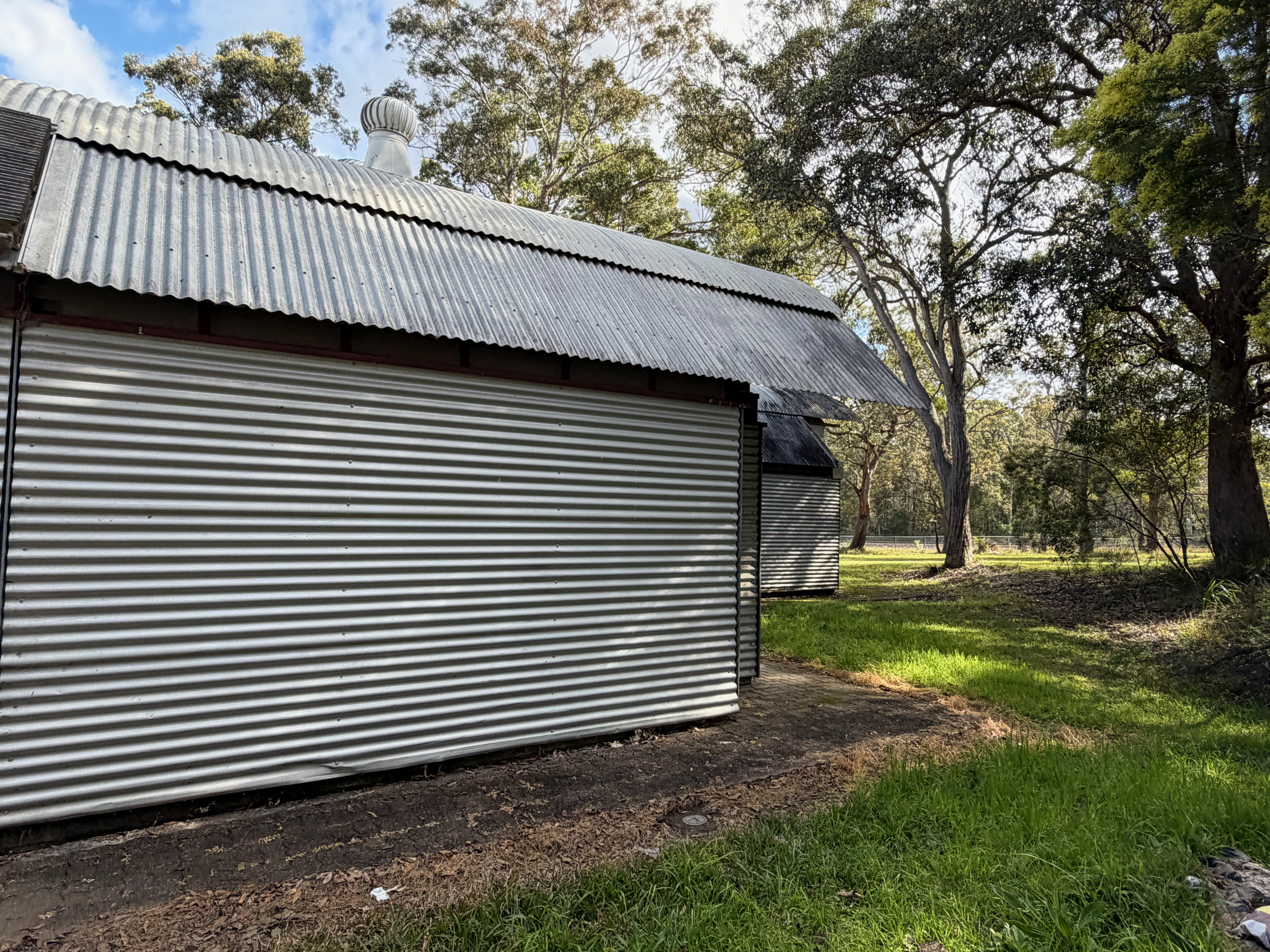
1982 Kempsey Museum, New South Wales

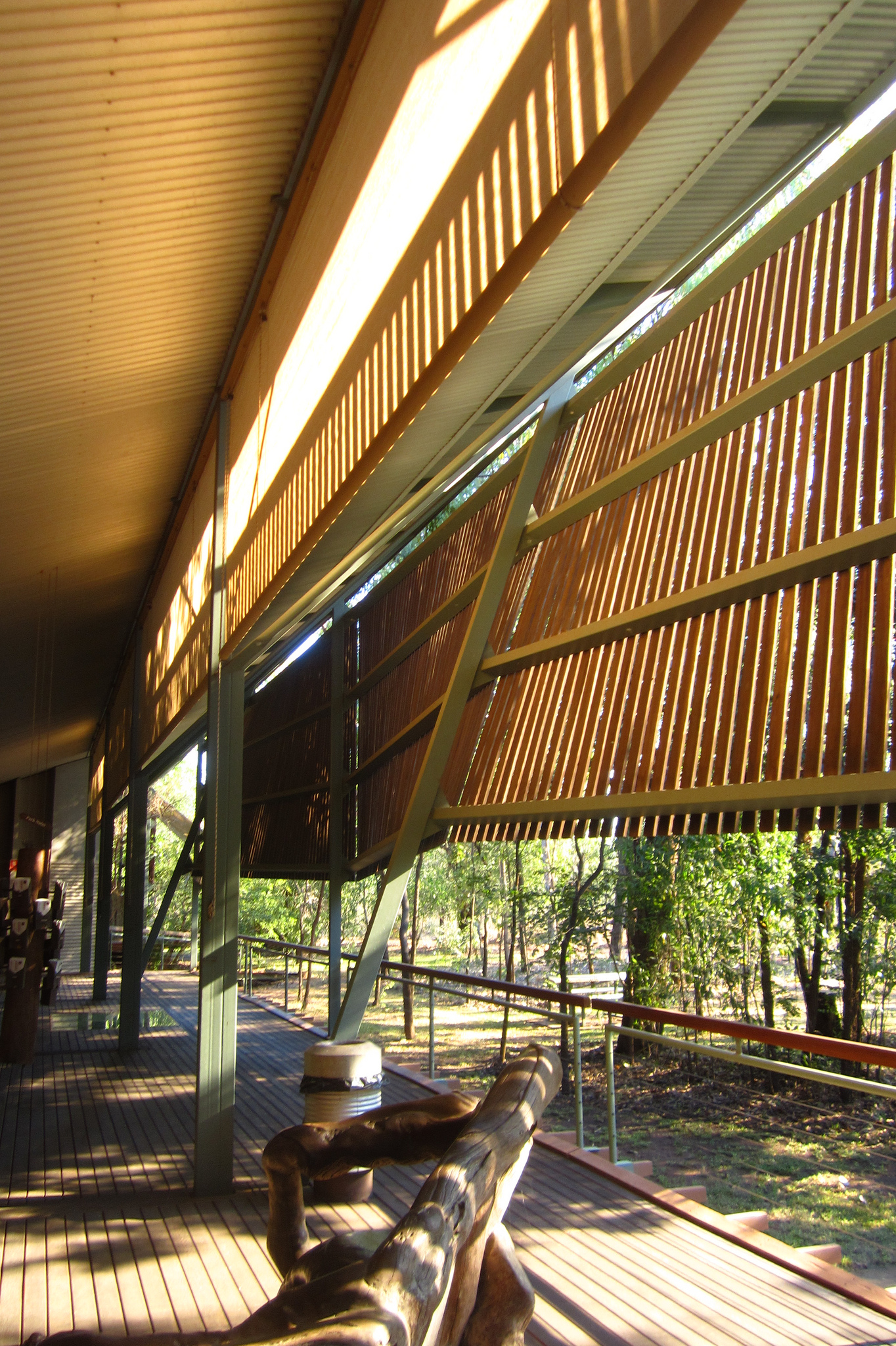
Bowali Visitor Information Centre, Kakadu National Park, in collaboration with Troppo Architects

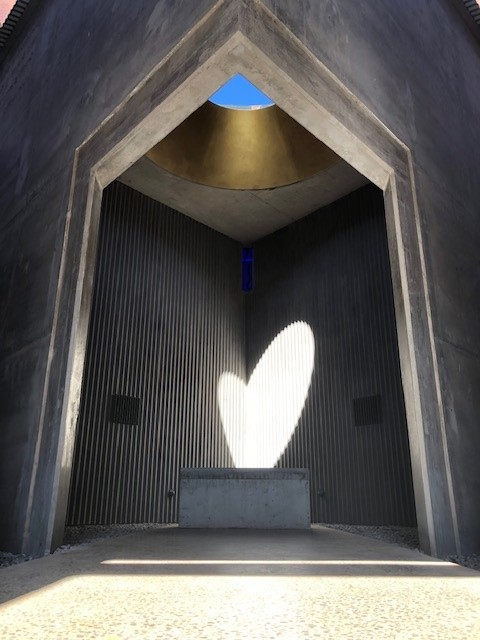
Cobar Sound Chapel, interior view

- 1967–1972: Douglas L Murcutt House, 22 Yarrabin Street, Belrose (NSW)
- 1967–1968: Apartment buildings 'Sefton', 66 Shirley Road, Wollstonecraft and its adjacent twin apartment building 'Tintern', at 68 Shirley Road, Wollstonecraft (possibly with Ancher Mortlock Murray and Woolley)
- 1972–1974: Laurie Short House, Sydney (NSW)
- 1974–1975: Marie Short House, Kempsey (NSW)
- 1976–1983: Berowra Waters Inn, Berowra Waters (NSW)
- 1977–1978: Ockens House, Cromer (NSW)
- 1977–1980: Nicholas House, Mount Irvine (NSW)
- 1977–1980: Carruthers House, Mount Irvine (NSW)
- 1982: Kempsey Visitor Information Centre (NSW)
- 1981–1983: Ball–Eastaway House, Glenorie NSW)
  Heritage listed, February 2026
- 1982–1984: Zachary's Restaurant, Terrey Hills, (NSW)
- 1976–1988: Museum of Local History and Tourist Office, Kempsey (NSW)
- 1981–1982 & 2001–2004: Fredericks/White House, Jamberoo (NSW)
- 1982–1984: Magney House, Bingie Bingie (NSW)
- 1986–1987: Stuart Littlemore House, Woollahra (NSW)
- 1986–1990: Magney House, Sydney (NSW)
- 1988–1991: Done House, Sydney (NSW)
- 1988–1992: Meagher House, Bowral (NSW)
- 1992: Raheen (Pratt Family Wing Addition), Kew (VIC)
- 1989–1994: Simpson–Lee House II, Mount Wilson (NSW)
- 1991–1994: Marika–Alderton House, Yirrkala Community, Eastern Arnhem Land (NT)
- 1992: Murcutt Guest Studio, Kempsey (NSW)
- 1992–1994: Bowali Visitor Information Centre, Kakadu National Park (NT), in collaboration with Troppo Architects
- 1994–1997: Deakins/Beckwith House, Woollahra (NSW)
- 1994–1996: Schnaxl House, Newport (NSW)
- 1996–1998: Fletcher–Page House, Kangaroo Valley (NSW)
- 1995–1996: Douglas and Ruth Murcutt House, Woodside (SA)
- 1996–1999: Arthur and Yvonne Boyd Education Centre, Riversdale, Bundanon, West Cambewarra (NSW), in collaboration with Reg Lark and Wendy Lewin
- 1997–2001: House at Kangaloon (NSW)
- 2000–2003: Murcutt/Lewin House and Studio, Mosman (NSW) in collaboration with Wendy Lewin
- 2001–2005: Walsh House, Kangaroo Valley (NSW)
- 2002–2003: Lerida Estate Winery, Lake George (NSW)
- 2006–2007: Moss Vale Education Centre (University of Wollongong), Moss Vale (NSW), in collaboration with Wendy Lewin
- 2006–2016: Australian Islamic Centre, Newport (VIC)
- 2019: MPavilion, Melbourne
- 2016–2022: Cobar Sound Chapel, Cobar (NSW)

== Honours and awards ==
Prestigious awards include:

- 1992: RAIA Gold Medal of the Royal Australian Institute of Architects
- 1992: Alvar Aalto Medal
- 1996: Officer of the Order of Australia, for 'service to architecture as designer of residential, commercial and public buildings inspired by the Australian landscape and Aboriginal culture'.
- 1998: Richard Neutra Award for Teaching
- 1999: 'Green Pin' Award from the Royal Danish Academy of Architects
- 2001: Thomas Jefferson Medal in Architecture
- 2002: Pritzker Architecture Prize
- 2003: Kenneth F. Brown Asia Pacific Culture and Architecture Award
- 2004: New South Wales Enduring Architecture Award and National Award for Enduring Architecture for Kempsey Farmhouse
- 2009: American Institute of Architects Gold Medal
- 2011: New South Wales Enduring Architecture Award and National Award for Enduring Architecture for Magney House, Bingie
- 2021: Praemium Imperiale

He is an Honorary Fellow of the American Institute of Architects (AIA), an International Fellow of the Royal Institute of British Architects (RIBA), an Honorary Fellow of the Royal Architectural Institute of Canada, an Honorary Fellow of the Finnish Association of Architects as well as Honorary Member of the Architects Institutes in Taiwan, Scotland and Singapore. In 2008 he was elected an Honorary Member of the American Academy of Arts and Letters. In 2010, he was named a Senior Fellow of the Design Futures Council. He was founding President of the Australian Architecture Association and is Chair of the Architecture Foundation Australia (annual Murcutt International Master Class).

== Bibliography ==
- "Glenn Murcutt Pritzker Prize ", ArchitectureWeek No. 94, 2002.0417, pN1.1.
- Beck, Haig and Cooper, Jackie, A Singular Practice. Images, April 2006. ISBN 1-876907-75-4.
- Carter, Nanette "Locating Design: A Site Every Design Professional Should See: The Marika-Alderton House, Yirrkala" Design and Culture, Vol. 3, No. 3, (Nov. 2011), pp. 375–378. ISSN 1754-7075
- Fromonot, Francoise. Glenn Murcutt: Buildings and Projects 1962–2003. Thames and Hudson, London/New York, 2005. ISBN 978-0-500-28589-3. ISBN 0-500-28589-6
- Drew, Philip. Leaves of Iron: Glenn Murcutt: Pioneer of an Australian Architectural Form. ISBN 0-207-17327-3.
- Drew, Philip. Touch This Earth Lightly: Glenn Murcutt in His Own Words. Duffy & Snellgrove, 15 May 2000. ISBN 1-875989-46-3.
- Farrelly, Elizabeth Glenn Murcutt – Three Houses (Architecture in Detail). Phaidon Press Inc. (October 1993). ISBN 0-7148-2875-0.
- Gusheh, Heneghan, Lassan, Seyama, "The Architecture of Glenn Murcutt", TOTO, Japan, 2008. ISBN 978-4-88706-293-1
- Gusheh, Heneghan, Lassan, Seyama, "Glenn Murcutt – Thinking Drawing, Working Drawing", TOTO, Japan, 2008. ISBN 978-4-88706-294-8
- Limited Edition Folio, "Glenn Murcutt Architect", Essays by Kenneth Frampton, Juhani Pallasmaa, boxed photos/drawings. 01 Editions, Sydney, 2006. ISBN 0-9775931-0-X.
- Muller, Brook "In the Landscape of Murcutt", ArchitectureWeek No. 66, 2001.0912, pE1.1.
- Sharp, Dennis. The Illustrated Encyclopedia of Architects and Architecture. New York: Quatro Publishing, 1991. ISBN 0-8230-2539-X. NA40.I45. p111.
