= R. Bruce Patty =

American Architect

- Born: January 25, 1935; Kansas City, Missouri
- Died: December 16, 1998 (aged 63); Sarasota, Florida
- Occupation: Architect
- Awards: Fellow, American Institute of Architects (1980)
- Practice: BNIM

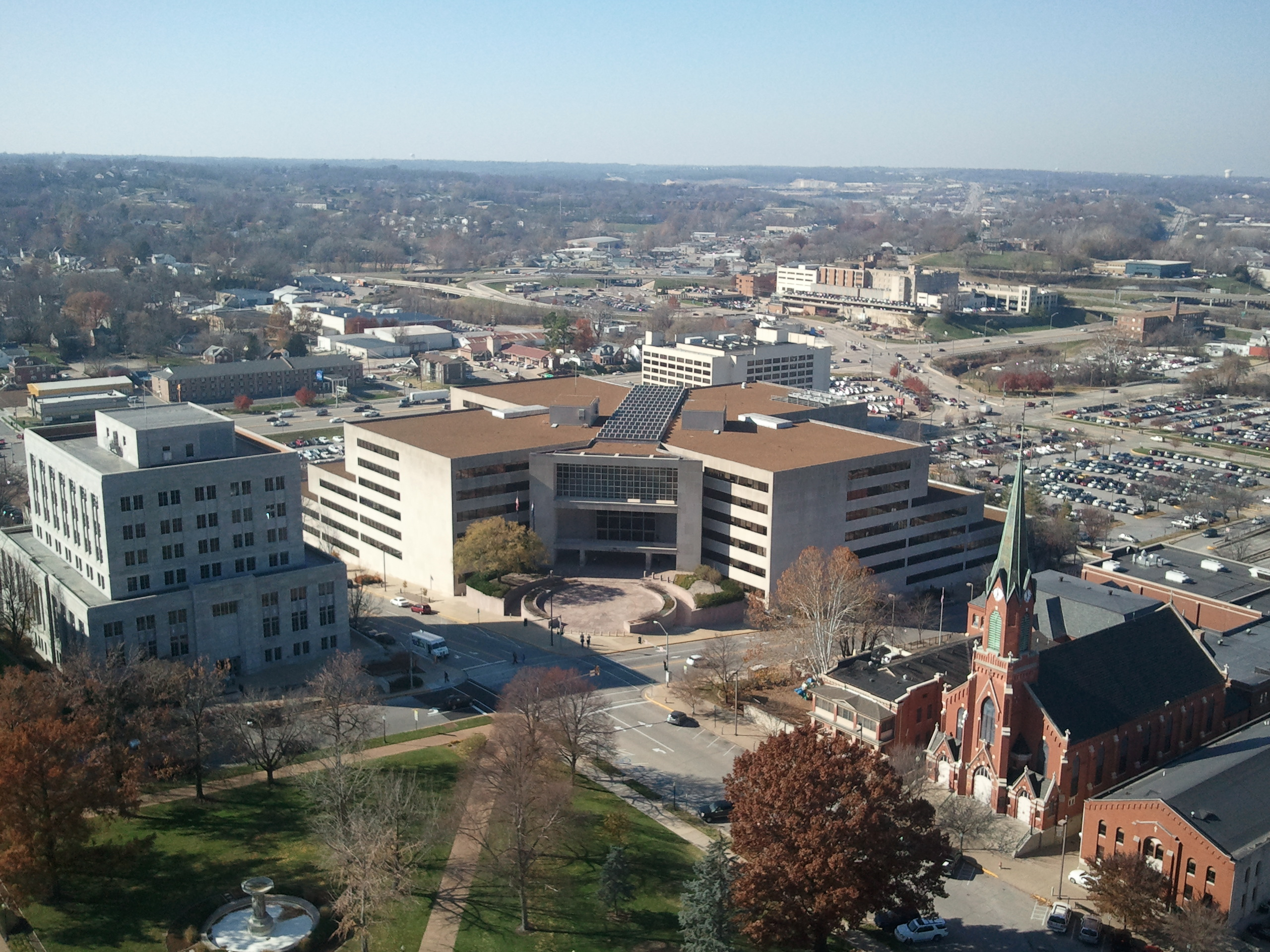
The Harry S. Truman State Office Building in Jefferson City, Missouri, designed by Patty for Patty Berkebile Nelson Associates and completed in 1983.

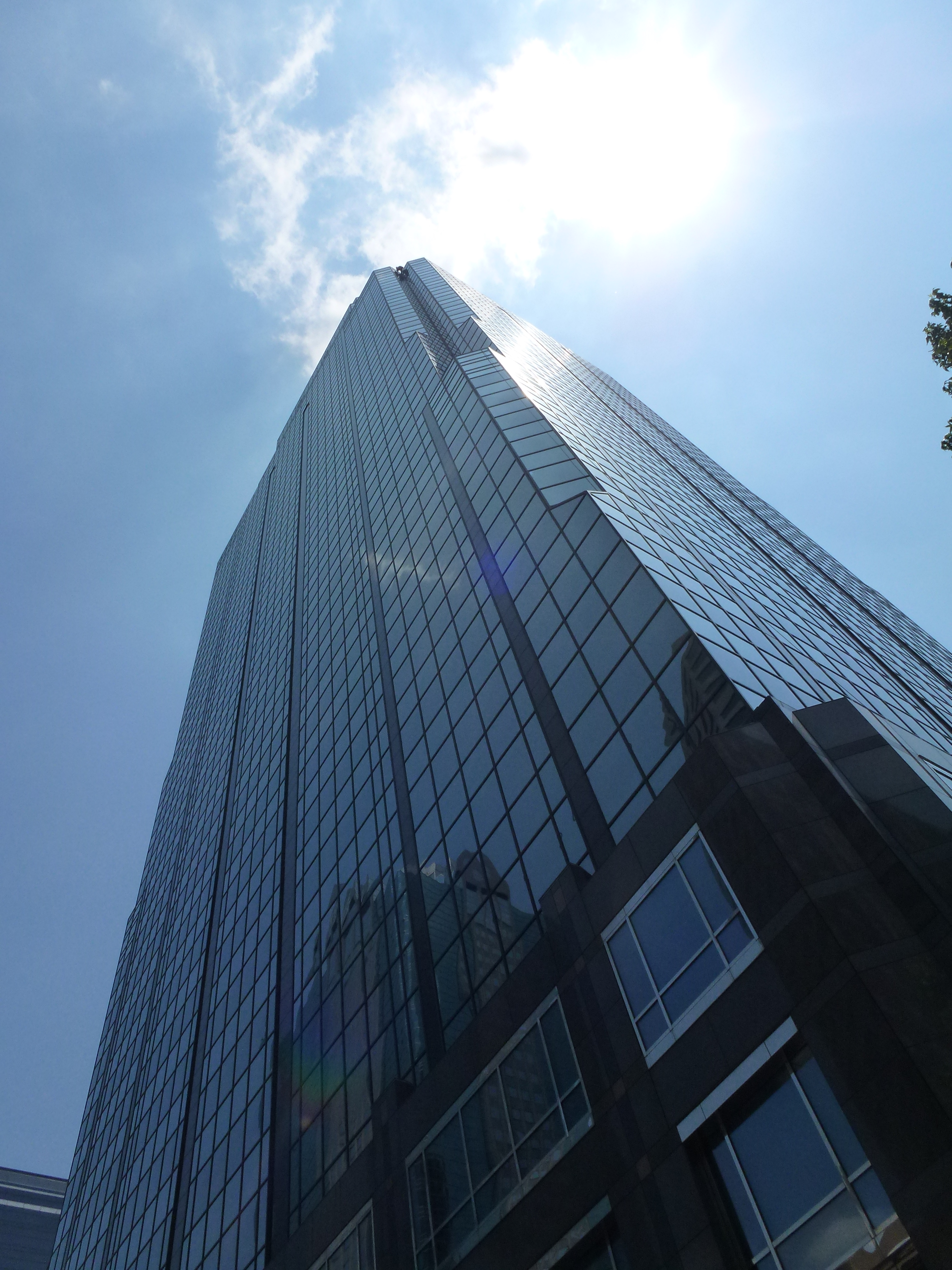
One Kansas City Place, completed in 1988.

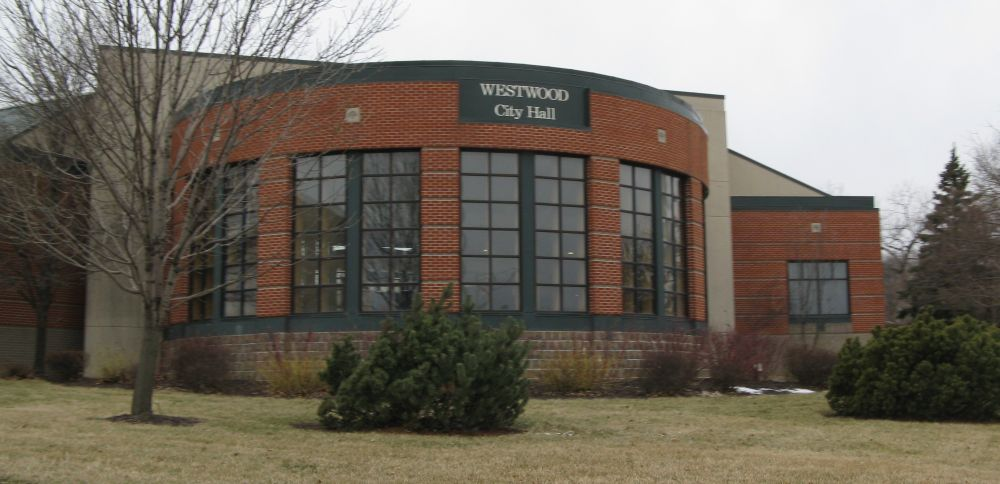
The Westwood City Hall in Westwood, Kansas, completed in 1991.

R. Bruce Patty FAIA (January 25, 1935 – December 16, 1998) was an American architect in practice in Kansas City, Missouri from 1963 until his death in 1998. He was co-founder of the Kansas City firm known as BNIM in 1970 and he served as president of the American Institute of Architects for the year 1985.

== Life and career ==
Robert Bruce Patty was born January 25, 1935, in Kansas City, Missouri to Charles Everett Patty and Sarah Louise (Pendleton) Patty. He attended the Kansas City public schools and the University of Kansas, graduating from the latter in 1958 with a BS in architecture. In 1959 he joined the Kansas City firm of Kivett & Myers and was promoted to associate in 1963. With Kivett & Myers he was involved in the design of major projects including the Kansas City International Airport (1972). In 1970 he left to form the firm of Patty Berkebile Nelson Love with Robert J. Berkebile, Thompson C. Nelson and William Love. After Love's departure in 1974 the firm became Patty Berkebile Nelson Associates and later Patty Berkebile Nelson Immenschuh. Major works of the firm include the Harry S. Truman State Office Building (1983) in Jefferson City, then the largest architectural contract let by the State of Missouri, and the Hyatt Regency Crown Center (1980) and One Kansas City Place (1988) in Kansas City. Patty was not involved in the design of the Hyatt Regency and was not implicated in the Hyatt Regency walkway collapse.

In 1991 Patty left the firm he founded to form the firm of Patty/Archer/Architects/Engineers with the E. T. Archer Corporation. As a member of this firm Patty designed the Tony Aguirre Community Center (2001) in Kansas City beginning in 1992, but his departure from the firm in 1994 contributed to major difficulties for the project. In the latter year he joined Burns & McDonnell where he served first as vice president of architecture and later as vice president of marketing. He remained with Burns & McDonnell until his death in 1998.

Patty joined the American Institute of Architects (AIA) in 1965 as a member of the Kansas City chapter. He served in several chapter leadership roles including president. He was chair of the chapter committee in charge of the 1979 AIA convention, held in Kansas City. From 1980 to 1982 he served as regional director from the Central States and in 1983 he was elected first vice president/president elect for 1984 and president for 1985. He was the second Kansas Citian to serve as AIA president following Henry Van Brunt, president for the year 1899. As president Patty emphasized technological progress, especially the adoption of computers. In the same year he chaired the AIA delegation to the International Union of Architects (UIA) congress in Cairo.

Patty was elected a fellow of the AIA in 1980 and after his presidency was elected an honorary member of the Royal Architectural Institute of Canada (RAIC) and the Federation of Colleges of Architects of the Mexican Republic (FCARM).

Raj Barr-Kumar, later a president of the AIA himself, worked for Patty's firm in the mid-1970s.

== Personal life ==
Patty was married in 1958 to Donna Jean Watts. They had three children, Kristen, Jennifer and Scott, and lived in a home Patty designed himself in Fairway, Shawnee Mission, Kansas. In later life Patty and his wife spent much of their time in Sarasota, Florida, where Patty died December 15, 1998, at the age of 63.

In 2001 he was posthumously awarded the AIA Missouri Distinguished Service Award.

== Architectural works ==
- Missouri Bar Center, (Note: Designed as an associate of Kivett & Myers.) 326 Monroe St, Jefferson City, Missouri (1964)
- Kansas City International Airport, Kansas City, Missouri (1972)
- Kansas City Convention Center, Kansas City, Missouri (1976)
- South Central Patrol Division, 1880 E 63rd St, Kansas City, Missouri (1977, demolished)
- Gannett Hall, University of Missouri, Columbia, Missouri (1980)
- St. Joseph Civic Arena, St. Joseph, Missouri (1980)
- Harry S. Truman State Office Building, Jefferson City, Missouri (1983)
- Mast Advertising headquarters, 7500 W 110th St, Overland Park, Kansas (1984)
- Kansas City Merchandise Mart (former), 6800 W 115th St, Overland Park, Kansas (1986)
- One Kansas City Place, Kansas City, Missouri (1988)
- 7101 Tower, 7101 College Blvd, Overland Park, Kansas (1989)
- PPG Industries biomedical systems division headquarters, 16505 W 113th St, Lenexa, Kansas (1989)
- Westwood City Hall, 4700 Rainbow Blvd, Westwood, Kansas (1991)
- Tony Aguirre Community Center, Kansas City, Missouri (2001)
