= Kivett and Myers =

American architectural firm (1931–1975)

Kivett & Myers

Practice information
- Firm type: Architecture
- Partners: Clarence Kivett FAIA; Ralph E. Myers FAIA
- Founders: Kivett
- Founded: 1931 (95 years ago)
- Dissolved: 1975 (51 years ago)
- Location: Kansas City, Missouri, U.S.

Significant works and honors
- Projects: Truman Sports Complex; terminals and control tower at Kansas City International Airport

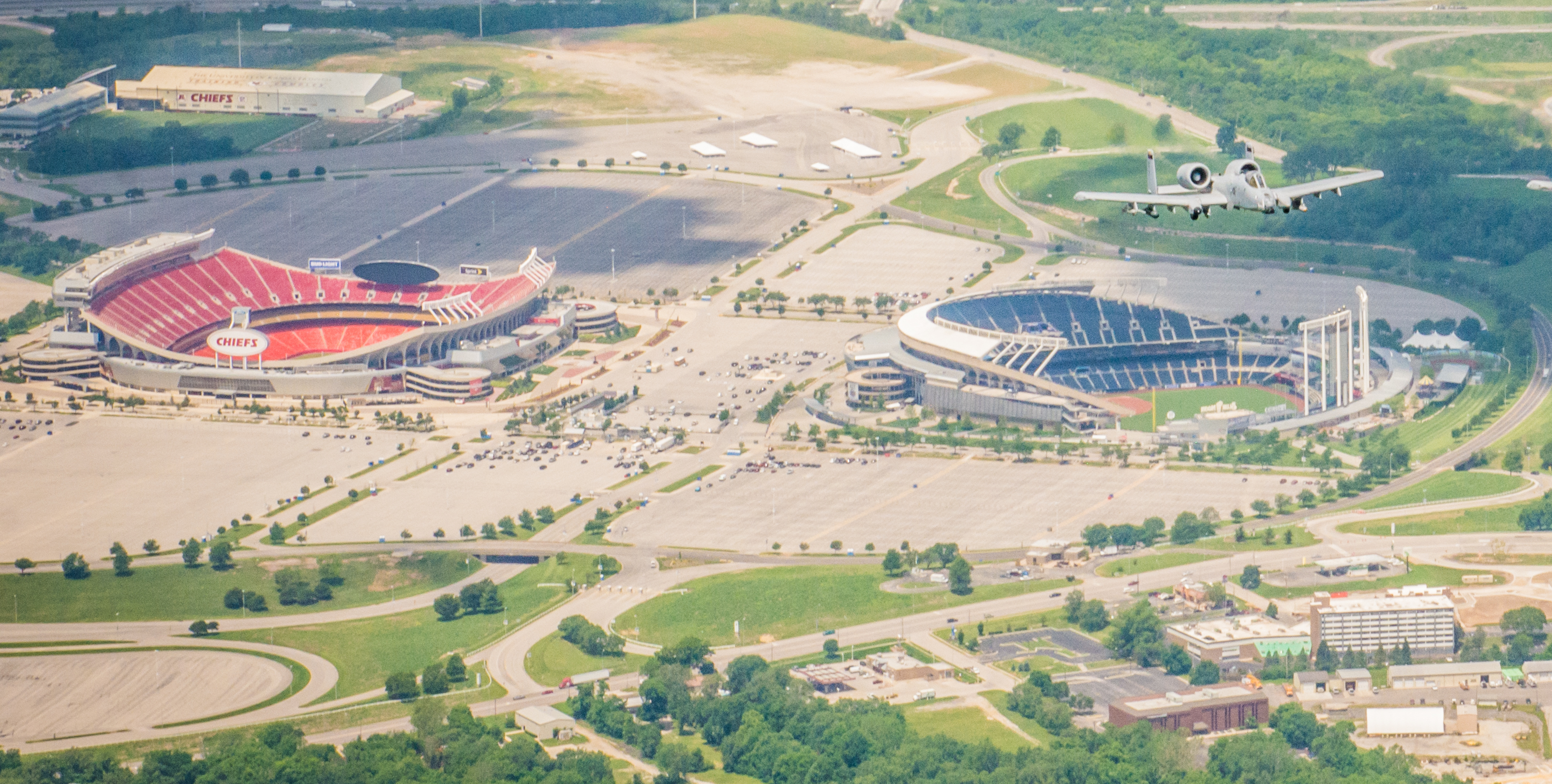
An aerial view of the Truman Sports Complex, designed by Kivett & Myers, from a concept by Charles Deaton, and completed in phases in 1972 and 1973.

Kivett & Myers was an architecture firm in Kansas City, Missouri, United States, that pioneered the design of modern professional sports stadiums.

The firm was established in 1931 as the sole proprietorship of Clarence Kivett. With the addition of Ralph E. Myers in 1945, the firm became the partnership of Kivett & Myers. The firm was acquired by HNTB in 1975.

== History ==
Kivett's first big design project was the Art Deco design of the flagship Katz Drug Store (1934), later an Osco, at Kansas City's Main Street and Westport Road in the Westport neighborhood. The owners, Mike and Ike Katz, were his mother's brothers.

He was joined by Ralph Myers in 1940, and they became partners in Kivett and Myers in 1945.

They went on to design the Cumonow Residence in Mission Hills, Kansas, the Missouri State Office Building at 13th and Holmes, the old Temple B'nai Jehudah at 69th and Holmes, Spencer Chemistry and Biological Sciences Building at the University of Missouri–Kansas City and the Fairmount Hotel in the Country Club Plaza and the Mission Hills Country Club clubhouse.

The partners had a major role in the introduction and expansion of modern architecture in Kansas City and were committed to modernist principles. The two most-prominent commissions came in the late 1960s and early 1970s with terminals and control tower at Kansas City International Airport (a design layout with in "C" shape so that all gates were within a few feet of the road) and the Truman Sports Complex for Kansas City Chiefs and Kansas City Royals.

A prominent feature of the stadia design favoured by Kivett and Myers is the spiral ramps leading to the higher echelons of seating. This can be seen at Kauffman Stadium and Arrowhead Stadium in Kansas City (as well as the now-demolished Giants Stadium in East Rutherford, New Jersey). The initial design in 1967 called for the baseball and football stadiums to be built side by side sharing the same parking infrastructure as well as a rolling roof that was to slide from one stadium to the other. The concepts of separate stadiums for baseball and football was revolutionary at the time when stadiums were designed as gigantic multipurpose venues. The rolling roof was initially too expensive and too impractical in Kansas City. However, it was to be applied at several stadiums elsewhere in the decades that followed.

In 1975, the Kansas City civil-engineering and architecture firm HNTB acquired Kivett and Myers, with Kivett retiring and Myers becoming HNTB's first architectural partner. At the time of the acquisition, major in-progress projects included the Lisbon Airport and Munich Airport. Myers retired in 1982.

During the thirty years the partnership was active, Kivett and Myers were awarded nearly half of all design awards awarded by the local chapter of the AIA.

== Legacy ==
In addition to HNTB as the firm's official successor, Kivett and Myers employees would found over fifty independent architecture firms in the Kansas City area. The largest and best-known of these is BNIM, founded by R. Bruce Patty and three other Kivett associates in 1970.

HNTB went on to build several professional stadiums, indoor arenas and ballparks. Several of the firm's architects also went on to open a sports architecture office in Kansas City for Hellmuth, Obata & Kassabaum in 1983, now the independent firm of Populous, with offices in Kansas City, London and Brisbane. In 1988, several more architects left HNTB and opened a sports architecture office in Kansas City for Ellerbe Becket. This practice was known primarily for professional indoor sports arenas, but was also responsible for several major stadia.

== Partner biographies ==
=== Clarence Kivett ===
Clarence Kivett FAIA (October 18, 1905 – December 3, 1996) was born Clarence Kivovitch in Saint Paul, Minnesota. He was educated at the University of Kansas, graduating in 1928 with a BS in architecture. He worked for Kansas City architects Madorie & Bihr and Hoit, Price & Barnes until 1931, when the economic conditions of the Great Depression caused the latter firm to let him go.

During World War II, Kivett was at Knob Noster, Missouri, where he superintended construction for the air force. He was active in the American Institute of Architects (AIA) and was elected a Fellow in 1967.

Kivett was married in 1934. He lived for twenty years after his retirement and died in Kansas City at the age of 91.

=== Ralph E. Myers ===
Ralph Elbert Myers FAIA (November 30, 1917 – December 3, 2007) was born in Kansas City. He was educated at the University of Illinois, graduating in 1940 with a BArch. He then worked for Kivett for a year while also teaching at the Finlay Engineering College. In 1941, during World War II, he joined North American Aviation and had charge of plant design for the next four years.

Myers was also active in the AIA and was elected a Fellow in 1964. He died in Prairie Village, Kansas, at the age of 90.

== Architectural works ==
- 1934 – Katz Drug Store, 3948 Main St, Kansas City, Missouri
- 1949 – Macy's, (Note: Demolished.) 1034 Main St, Kansas City, Missouri
- 1949 – St Ann Catholic Church and School, 7231 Mission Road, Prairie Village, Kansas
- 1955 – Southeast High School, 3500 E Meyer Blvd, Kansas City, Missouri
- 1956 – Missouri Public Service Company building, 10700 E State Rte 350, Raytown, Missouri
- 1957 – Temple B'nai Jehudah, Holmes Rd, Kansas City, Missouri
- 1961 – Hallmark Cards production center, 101 McDonald Dr, Lawrence, Kansas
- 1961 – Hilton Inn, Kansas City, Missouri
- 1964 – Missouri Bar Center, 326 Monroe St, Jefferson City, Missouri
- 1965 – Oak Park High School, 825 NE 79th Terr, Kansas City, Missouri
- 1968 – Federal Reserve Bank of Kansas City annex (former), 925 Grand, Kansas City, Missouri
- 1968 – Fletcher Daniels Office Building, 615 East 13th St, Kansas City, Missouri
- 1969 – Belton High School, 801 W North Ave, Belton, Missouri
- 1969 – Tucker Hall, University of Missouri, Columbia, Missouri
- 1970 – Nunemaker Center, University of Kansas, Lawrence, Kansas
- 1972 – Arrowhead Stadium, Truman Sports Complex, Kansas City, Missouri
- 1972 – Kansas City International Airport, Kansas City, Missouri
- 1973 – Kauffman Stadium, Truman Sports Complex, Kansas City, Missouri
- 1976 – Giants Stadium, 50 Route 120, East Rutherford, New Jersey

== See also ==
- List of architecture firms
- List of companies of Missouri
