= BNIM =

American architecture and design firm

BNIM (Berkebile Nelson Immenschuh McDowell, Inc.) is an architecture and design firm founded in 1970 in Kansas City, Missouri.

BNIM’s notable sustainable projects include the Iowa Utilities Board – Office of Consumer Advocate Office Building in Des Moines, IA, the Omega Center for Sustainable Living at the Omega Institute for Holistic Studies in Rhinebeck, New York (Living Building and LEED Platinum), the School of Nursing and Student Community Center at The University of Texas Health Science Center at Houston (LEED Gold), and the Lewis and Clark State Office Building in Jefferson City, Missouri (LEED Platinum).

== History ==
The firm was founded in 1970 in Kansas City, MO as Patty Berkebile Nelson Love Architects (PBNL) by R. Bruce Patty, Robert J. Berkebile, Thompson C. Nelson and William Love. Dating to its early history, the firm is dedicated to strengthening the urban core with projects and the civic involvement of firm members.

Two of the principals (Bob Berkebile and Tom Nelson) were members of a joint venture, PBNDML, that designed the Hyatt Regency Crown Center that was site of the 1981 Hyatt Regency walkway collapse.

Architect Edward Larrabee Barnes was the formal master of the hotel. However, two local Kansas City firms merged to formally design the hotel-including a consortium of R. Bruce Patty, Bob Berkebile and Tom Nelson (PBN), and Duncan Monroe Lefevre (DML).

Investigation of the accident determined the failure to be the fault of the structural engineer.

In 1987, Patty, Berkebile and Nelson formed a new firm with David Immenschuh, known as PBNI Architects. They were to design One Kansas City Place which is the tallest building in Missouri.

In 1991, Berkebile, Nelson and Immenschuh were joined by Steve McDowell and became Berkebile Nelson Immenschuh McDowell (BNIM).

== Description ==
The firm’s practice areas include sustainable design and community redevelopment; urban planning and design; educational facilities; campus master planning; civic, state and federal government work; residential, and corporate office spaces.

The firm has offices in Kansas City, Missouri; Des Moines, Iowa; and San Diego, California.

== Notable Projects ==
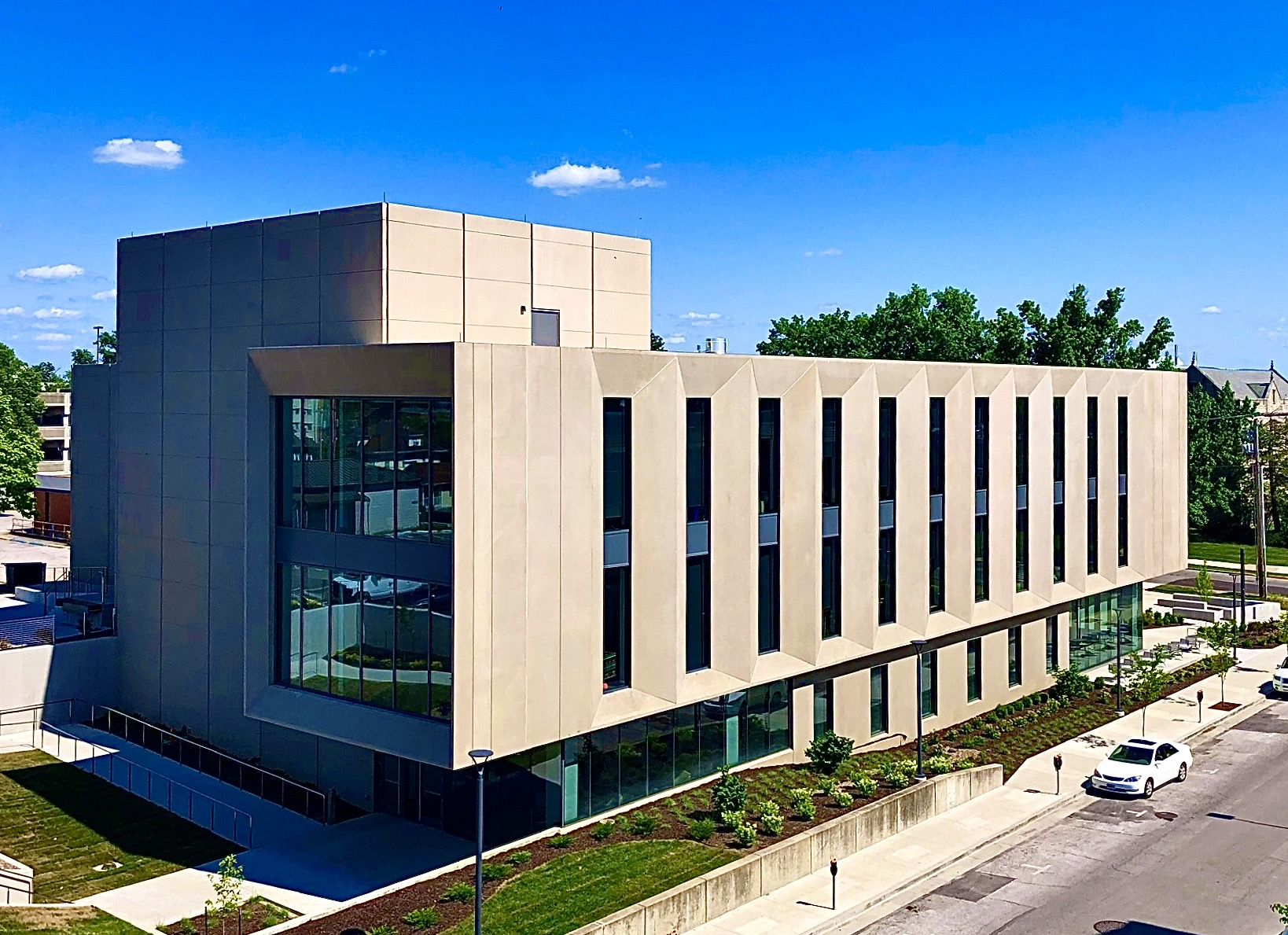
The Sinquefield Music Center at the University of Missouri School of Music

- Greensburg, Kansas, master plan following tornado outbreak of May 4–6, 2007, devastation
- Kauffman Center for the Performing Arts, Kansas City, MO (Executive Architect for Moshe Safdie)
- Omega Center for Sustainable Living, Omega Institute for Holistic Studies, Rhinebeck, NY (The OCSL was one of the first two buildings in the world to be certified as "living" by the International Living Building Institute.)
- Make It Right, New Orleans, LA
- Nelson-Atkins Museum Bloch Addition, Kansas City, MO (Architect of Record for Steven Holl)
- The School of Nursing and Student Community Center at The University of Texas Health Science Center at Houston, Houston, TX (with Lake|Flato)
- Fayez S. Sarofim Research Building, Home of The Brown Foundation Institute of Molecular Medicine for the Prevention of Human Diseases, The University of Texas Health Science Center at Houston, Houston, TX
- Fort Osage Education Center, Sibley, MO
- H. L. Hunley (submarine) Museum, Charleston, SC (in consortium)
- Union Station (Kansas City) – Science City Addition (in consortium with other architects)
- C. K. Choi Building, University of British Columbia, Vancouver, BC, Canada (consultant to Matsuzaki Wright Architects Inc.)
- St. Joseph Civic Arena, St. Joseph, MO (1980)
- John F. Kennedy Center for the Performing Arts addition (Architect of Record for Steven Holl) 2013
- University of Missouri School of Music, Sinqfied Music Center, Columbia, MO (2020)

== Awards ==
- 2010: American Institute of Architects Architecture Firm Award
