= Katherine Lee Schwennsen =

American architect

Katherine Lee Schwennsen is an American architect. She is a fellow with the American Institute of Architects and was the AIA's president from 2005 to 2006. In 2010 she was chosen to chair Clemson University’s School of Architecture.

She is Professor Emeritus and Director Emeritus of the Clemson University School of Architecture, where she guided a decade of remarkable growth and transformation. Before joining Clemson, Schwennsen served as Professor and Associate Dean at her alma mater, Iowa State University’s College of Design. Her journey in academia followed a successful decade in professional practice, where she honed her expertise at Bloodgood Architects & Planners and Engelbrecht & Griffin Architects.

Schwennsen was awarded AIA Iowa’s highest distinction, the Medal of Honor, in 2003. Twice recognized by Design Intelligence as one of the nation’s most Admired Design Educators (2014 and 2019), she has made a profound impact on the field of architectural education. Her accolades also include the American Institute of Architecture Students Outstanding Educator Award, the Presidential Medal for Distinguished Service from the National Council of Architectural Registration Boards, and the prestigious Christian Peterson Design Award—the highest honor conferred by Iowa State University’s College of Design. In recognition of her contributions to the profession, she holds honorary memberships in multiple international architectural organizations and is an Honorary Lifetime Trustee of the Clemson Architectural Foundation.

Schwennsen is a licensed architect in Iowa and received her Master of Architecture degree from Iowa State. She was the 82nd president of the American Institute of Architects, the second woman to be elected to lead the AIA, and second educator to serve as the Institute's leader. She is an advocate of diversity and sustainability.

On December 16, 2024, Kate Schwennsen, FAIA, was inaugurated as the 63rd Chancellor of the AIA College of Fellows in Washington, DC. She is the first woman to serve as both AIA President (2005–06) and Chancellor of the College of Fellows.
