= The Temple, Congregation B'nai Jehudah =

Reform synagogue in Kansas, United States

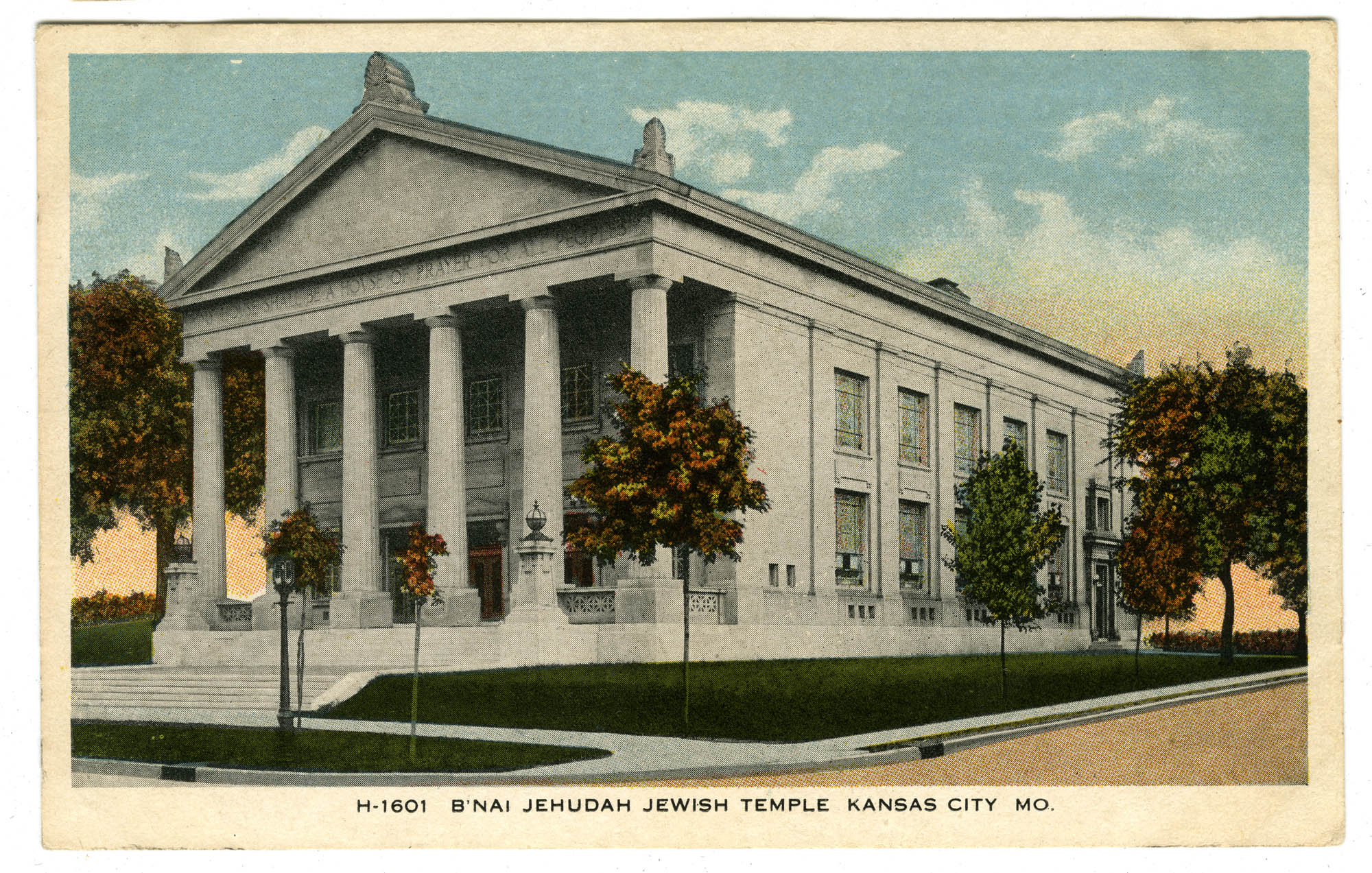
- The 1908 synagogue building, in Kansas City, Missouri

- Location in Kansas, close to the border with Missouri

Religion
- Affiliation: Reform Judaism
- Ecclesiastical or organizational status: Synagogue
- Leadership: Rabbi Stephanie Kramer; Rabbi Rachel Rothstein; Rabbi Caitlin BraznerRabbi Arthur P. Nemitoff (Emeritus)
- Status: Active

Location
- Location: 12320 Nall Avenue, Overland Park, Kansas 66209
- Country: United States
- Interactive map of The Temple, Congregation B'nai Jehudah
- Coordinates: 38°54′13″N 94°39′04″W

Architecture
- Architects: Frank M. Howe (1908); Kivett and Myers (1967)
- Type: Synagogue
- Style: Neoclassical (1908); Modernist (1967)
- Established: 1870 (as a congregation)
- Completed: 1885 (Oak Street); 1908 (Linwood Boulevard); 1967 (Holmes Road) (Note: Whilst the congregation moved in 1957, the sanctuary wasn't completed and dedicated until 1967.); 2000 (Nall Avenue)

Specifications
- Capacity: 300 worshippers (chapel)
- Site area: 24 acres (9.7 ha)

Website
- bnaijehudah.org

The Temple, Congregation B'nai Jehudah is a Reform Jewish congregation and synagogue located at 12320 Nall Avenue, in Overland Park, Kansas, in the United States. Established in 1870 in Kansas City, Missouri, it was a founding member of the Union for Reform Judaism. The congregation is the oldest and largest in the greater Kansas City metropolitan area.

Its fourth building, located on Holmes Road, was designed by Kivett and Myers architects in the Modernist style, considered "striking for its exterior profile and massing and its combination of natural and industrial forms to create an appearance rooted in both primeval nature and futuristic design." Completed and dedicated in 1967, it was demolished after the congregation relocated to Overland Park in 2000.

The senior rabbi is Stephanie Kramer, the rabbi is Caitlim Brazner and Rabbi Rachel Rothstein, and the rabbi emeritus is Arthur P. Nemitoff.
