= Truman Sports Complex =

Sports and entertainment facility in Kansas City, United States

Coordinates: 39°03′00″N 94°28′56″W

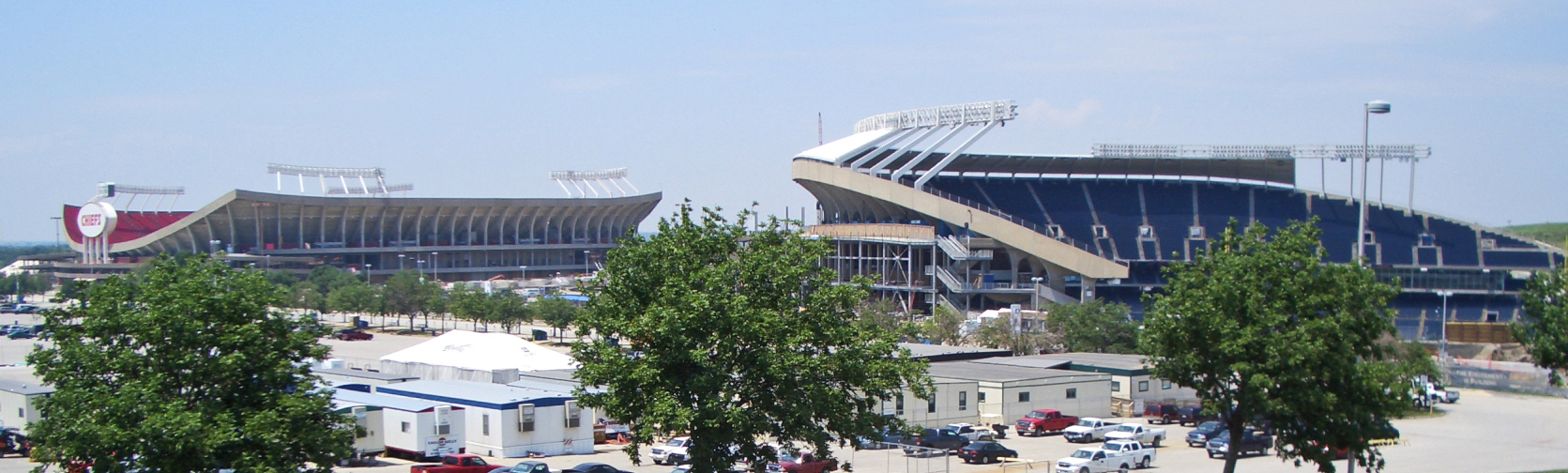
Truman Sports Complex, pictured before expansive renovations in the late 2000s, with Arrowhead Stadium and Kauffman Stadium.

The Truman Sports Complex is a sports and entertainment facility in Kansas City, Missouri, United States. It includes two major league sports venues: Arrowhead Stadium, which is home to the National Football League's Kansas City Chiefs, and Kauffman Stadium, which hosts Major League Baseball's Kansas City Royals. The complex also hosts various other events during the rest of the year. It is named after former U.S. President Harry S. Truman.

== Overview ==
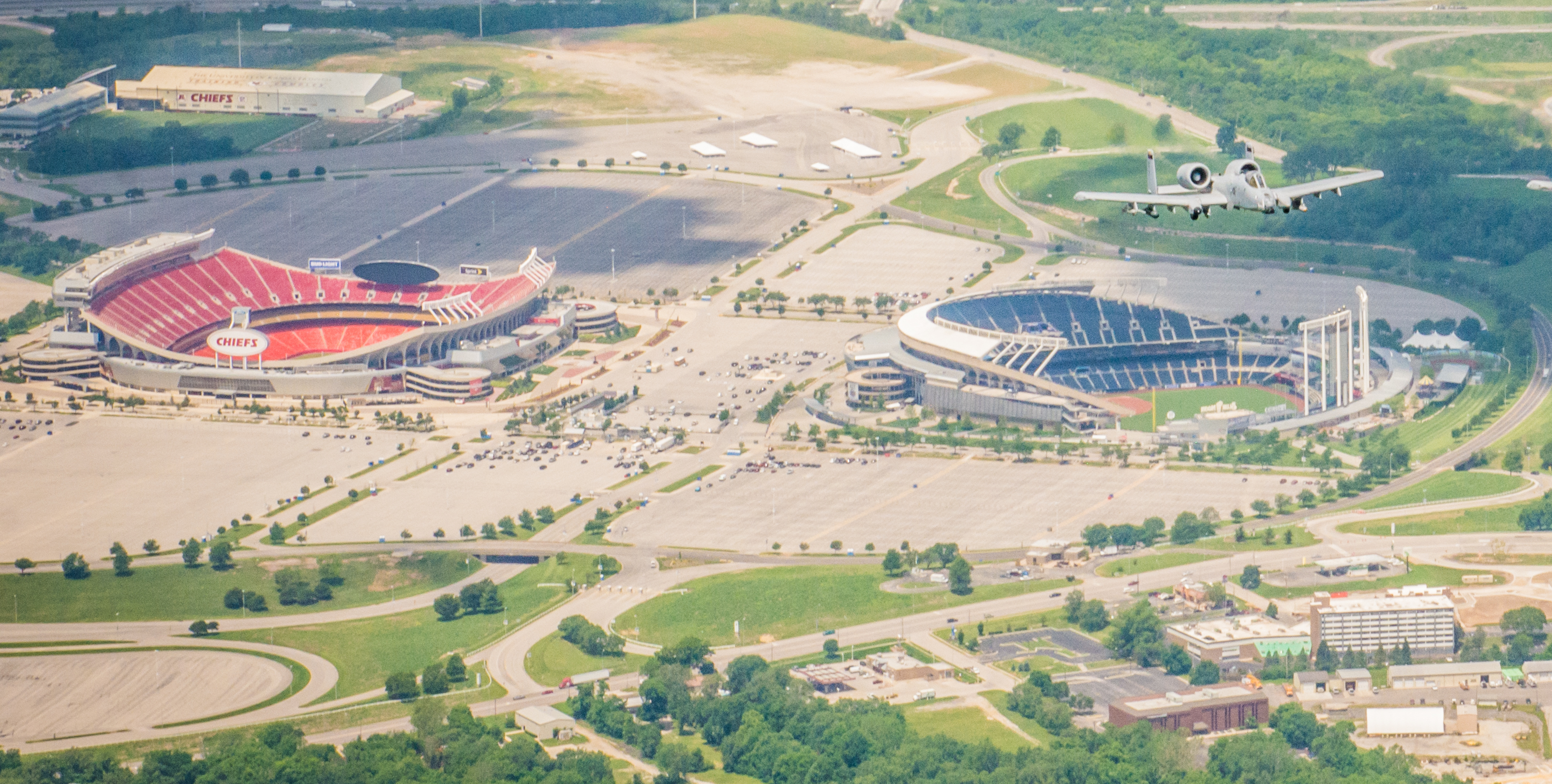
An A-10 Warthog flew over the complex in 2017.

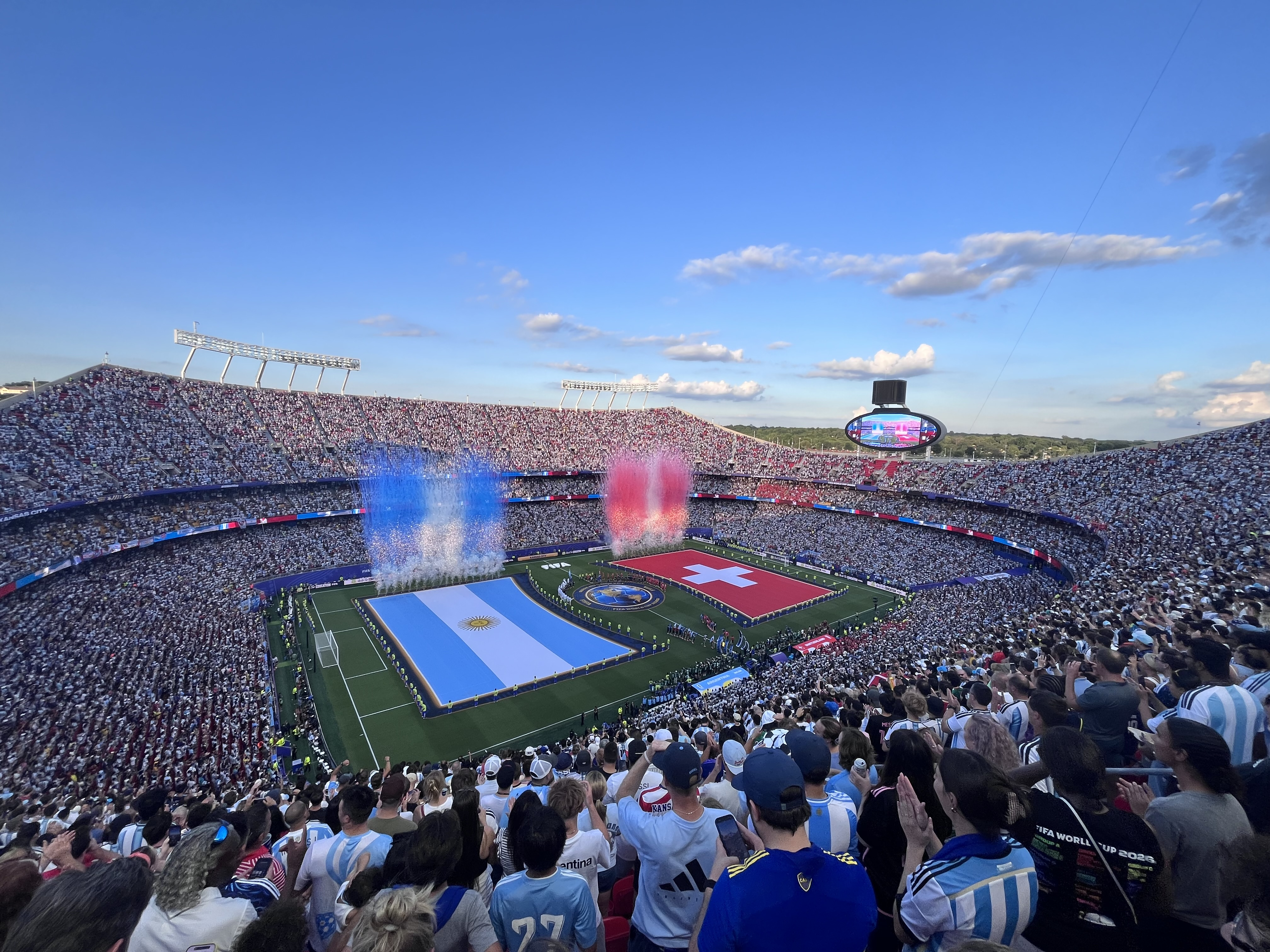
Arrowhead Stadium hosting a quarterfinal match between Argentina and Switzerland at the 2026 FIFA World Cup.

The Truman Sports Complex, built during the early 1970s, is owned by the government of Jackson County and managed by the Jackson County Sports Complex Authority, which is a State of Missouri agency. The current complex design, created by Charles Deaton, was arrived at when Deaton caught the ear of Kansas City Chiefs General Manager Jack Steadman and suggested building side-by-side stadiums for the two sports with each stadium customized to its needs. The original plan called for separate side-by-side stadiums with a mutual rolling roof. However, the roof was never built due to cost. The complex was revolutionary in an age when new stadiums tended to be built as multiuse venues for planning and cost purposes.

For this reason, Arrowhead and Kauffman are two of the few remaining professional sports stadiums of the era, whereas most contemporary multipurpose venues have been demolished with a small minority being converted to single-sport venues. By the turn of the century, the long-term limitations of the multi-purpose approach were widely viewed to far outweigh the short-term benefits.

The design not only made Deaton's reputation, but also made that of the architects that implemented his plans, Kivett and Myers. In 1975, the firm merged with Kansas City architect firm HNTB and went on to design stadiums like Giants Stadium, the RCA Dome, Broncos Stadium at Mile High, and Ralph Wilson Stadium. In 1983, several HNTB architects were hired by St. Louis-based architectural firm Hellmuth, Obata and Kassabaum, forming what would later become Populous and opening their primary office in Kansas City. Had the 40–year extension of an existing 3/8th Jackson County, Missouri, tax passed when it was put to a vote on April 2, 2024, Populous would have been the company to build New Royals Stadium.

The construction of the complex was undertaken by the joint venture of the Sharp, Kidde, and Webb construction firms.

On October 27, 1985, the Chiefs hosted a Noon kickoff game at Arrowhead Stadium against the Denver Broncos in which Denver won, 30–10. Later that night across the complex at Royals Stadium, the Royals won Game 7 of the 1985 World Series (7:30pm first pitch) against the St. Louis Cardinals.

Kansas City began a project to renovate both Arrowhead and Kauffman Stadiums in 2007, following the passage of a 3/8 cent sales tax increase in a referendum in 2006. Improvements to Kauffman Stadium were finished in time for the MLB Opening Day in 2009, and Arrowhead Stadium was completed in time for the NFL Opening Day in 2010. A separate tax referendum to raise funds to finally build the rolling roof failed. Both stadiums are being renovated by Populous.

With renovations, both the Royals and Chiefs have leases on the stadiums through January 31, 2031. Their previous lease which was renegotiated in 1990 had been set to expire January 31, 2015.

=== Arrowhead Stadium ===
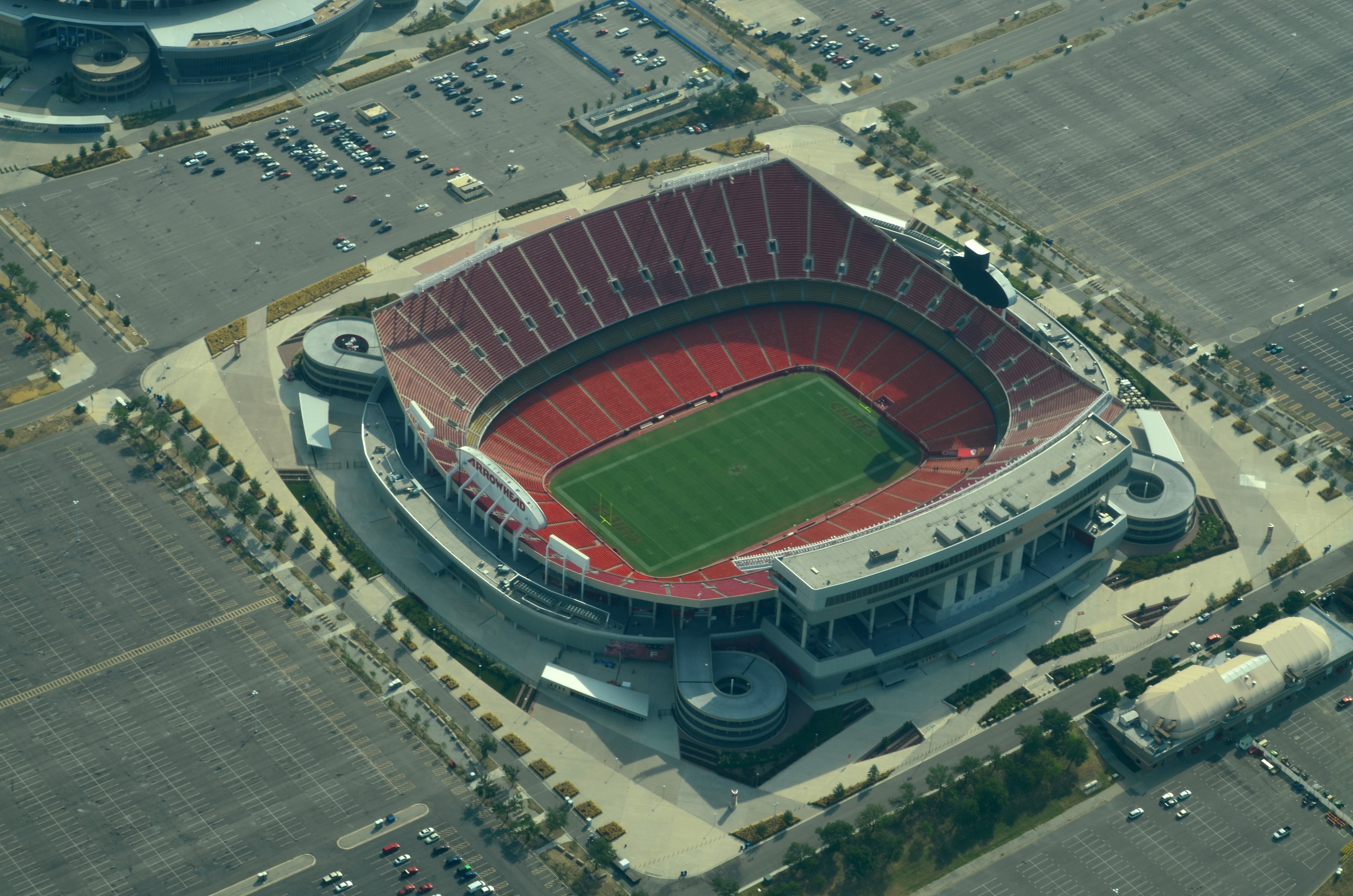
Arrowhead Stadium pictured in 2013

Arrowhead Stadium, home of the National Football League's Kansas City Chiefs, opened in the fall of 1972. George Halas called Arrowhead "the most revolutionary, futuristic sports complex I have ever seen." Fans occasionally refer to the stadium as "The Sea of Red" or simply just Arrowhead. The stadium is commonly referred to as the "Home of the CHIEFS" at the beginning of every home game. Arrowhead has long held a reputation for being one of, if not the, loudest outdoor stadium in the NFL due to the exuberance of the Chiefs' fans. In recent years, Arrowhead has competed with Lumen Field in Seattle for the loudest open-air stadium in the world, as certified by the Guinness Book of World Records. Kansas City briefly held the record when the crowd roar reached 137.5 decibels in a Chiefs victory over the Oakland Raiders on October 13, 2013; but Seattle's 12th Man broke the record only a few weeks later at 137.8 decibels. Arrowhead reclaimed the title, however, on September 29, 2014, when noise levels reached 142.2 decibels as the Chiefs defeated the New England Patriots on Monday Night Football. Arrowhead Stadium hosted several matches during the 2026 FIFA World Cup as Kansas City Stadium.

=== Kauffman Stadium ===
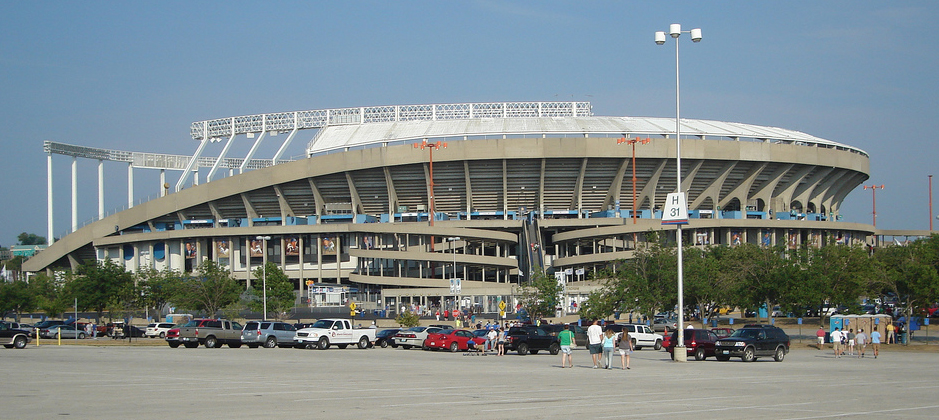
Kauffman Stadium

Kauffman Stadium, home of Major League Baseball's Kansas City Royals, opened in early 1973 as Royals Stadium and is located adjacent to Arrowhead. The stadium's name was changed in 1993 to honor Royals founder Ewing Kauffman just months before his death. Even though the stadium is slightly older than 40 years old, it is the sixth-oldest stadium in MLB, as a result of the construction of a number of new stadiums in the 1990s. It was the only baseball-specific stadium completed from the early 1960s until the early 1990s. It is also one of eight stadiums in Major League Baseball that doesn't have a corporate-sponsored name (the others are Yankee Stadium, Fenway Park, Wrigley Field, Oriole Park at Camden Yards, Dodger Stadium, Angel Stadium, and Nationals Park).

In addition to that, the stadium was the last baseball-only park that was built in the majors (not counting temporary facilities) from 1966 to 1991 and one of the few baseball-only facilities built in the majors during the heyday of the cookie-cutter stadium era, as well as one of two such facilities (alongside Dodger Stadium) that are still active and were never converted for use as multi-purpose stadiums. Despite its status as a baseball-only park throughout its history, it is one of only two active MLB stadiums (the other being Rogers Centre) that features symmetrical outfield dimensions, commonly associated with multi-purpose stadiums.
