= George H. Miller (architect, born 1949) =

American architect

George H. Miller is an American architect and a former partner of Pei Cobb Freed & Partners Architects LLP, the firm founded by I.M. Pei, Eason H. Leonard, and Henry N. Cobb.

Born in Berlin in 1949, he was president of the American Institute of Architects in 2010.
