= Clair W. Ditchy =

American architect (1891–1967)

- Born: April 12, 1891; Kelleys Island, Ohio
- Died: July 31, 1967 (aged 76); Royal Oak, Michigan
- Occupation: Architect

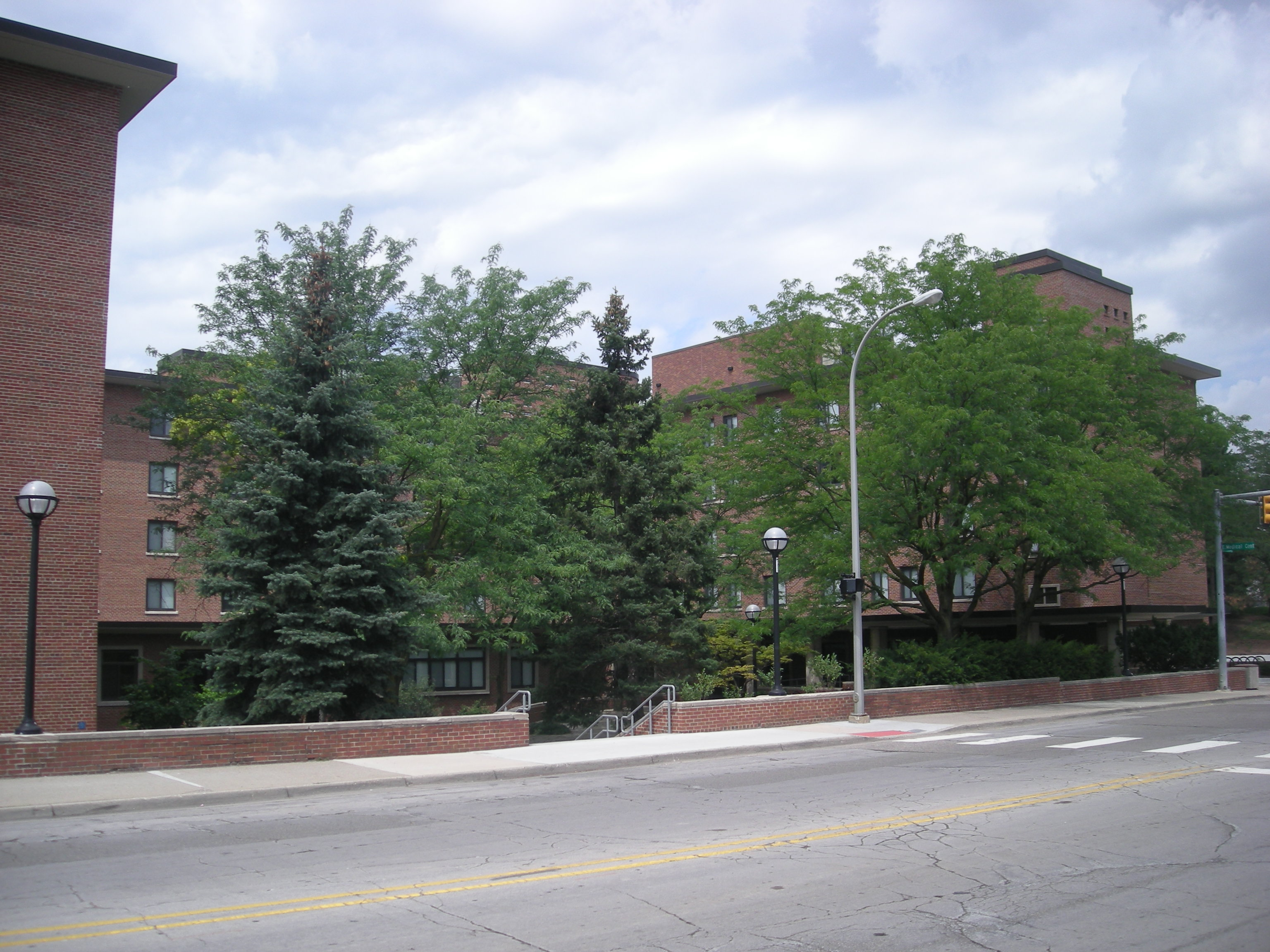
Alice Lloyd Hall of the University of Michigan, designed by Ditchy and completed in 1949.

Clair W. Ditchy FAIA (1891–1967) was an American architect in practice in Detroit from 1922 until 1967. From 1953 to 1955 he was president of the American Institute of Architects.

== Life and career ==
Clair William Ditchy was born April 12, 1891, in Kelleys Island, Ohio, to Peter Ditchy and Julia (Monaghan) Ditchy. He attended the University of Michigan, earning his B.Arch. degree in 1915. He worked for architects Albert Kahn, George D. Mason and Marcus Burrowes before opening his own office in 1922. For the first three years he shared his office with architect J. Ivan Dise but otherwise practiced alone until 1937, when he formed the firm of Ditchy–Farley–Perry, which became Ditchy–Perry–Sidnam in 1939 and dissolved in 1942. In 1959 he reorganized the firm as Clair Ditchy Associates. Ditchy remained head of the firm until his death in 1967. It was continued by his associate, Walter M. Dole, until his own death in 1972.

Ditchy joined the American Institute of Architects in 1924 as a member of the Detroit chapter. He was active in the chapter's affairs, serving as president, vice president and secretary. From 1938 to 1941 he was regional director for the Great Lakes. In 1947 he was elected secretary of the national organization, an office he filled until he was elected president in 1953, succeeding Glenn Stanton. He was elected to a second term in 1954, serving until 1955. In recognition of his contributions to the profession Ditchy was elected an honorary member of the Royal Institute of British Architects, the Royal Architectural Institute of Canada, the Colegio Nacional de Arquitectos de Cuba and the Philippine Institute of Architects. In 1956 he was granted an honorary Master of Architecture from the University of Michigan and an honorary Doctor of Engineering from the Lawrence Institute of Technology.

Ditchy was a prolific writer and speaker, publishing frequently in the local and architectural press.

== Personal life and death ==
Ditchy was married in 1920 to Berenice Bookmyer, and they had three children. The family lived in Royal Oak and were parishioners of the National Shrine of the Little Flower Basilica. Ditchy died July 31, 1967, in Royal Oak.

== Architectural works ==
- Climax Molybdenum Company laboratory, 14410 Woodrow Wilson St, Detroit, Michigan (1936 and 1950)
- Brewster Homes, (Note: Designed in association with other Detroit architects.) 2700 St Antoine St, Detroit, Michigan (1938, demolished)
- Shrine Catholic Grade School, 1621 Linwood Ave, Royal Oak, Michigan (1938)
- Parkside Homes, 5000 Conner St, Detroit, Michigan (1941)
- Alice Lloyd Hall, University of Michigan, Ann Arbor, Michigan (1949)
- Fairbanks Elementary School (former), 8000 John C Lodge Fwy, Detroit, Michigan (1955)
- Greyhound Terminal, (Note: Designed in association with William Strudwick Arrasmith of Louisville, Kentucky.) 130 E Congress St, Detroit, Michigan (1958, demolished 1990)
