= S. Scott Ferebee Jr. =

American architect (1921–2016)

- Born: July 30, 1921; Detroit
- Died: November 19, 2016 (aged 95); Charlotte, North Carolina
- Occupation: Architect
- Awards: Fellow of the American Institute of Architects
- Practice: Higgins & Ferebee; Higgins, Ferebee & Walters; Ferebee & Walters; Ferebee, Walters & Associates; FWA Group

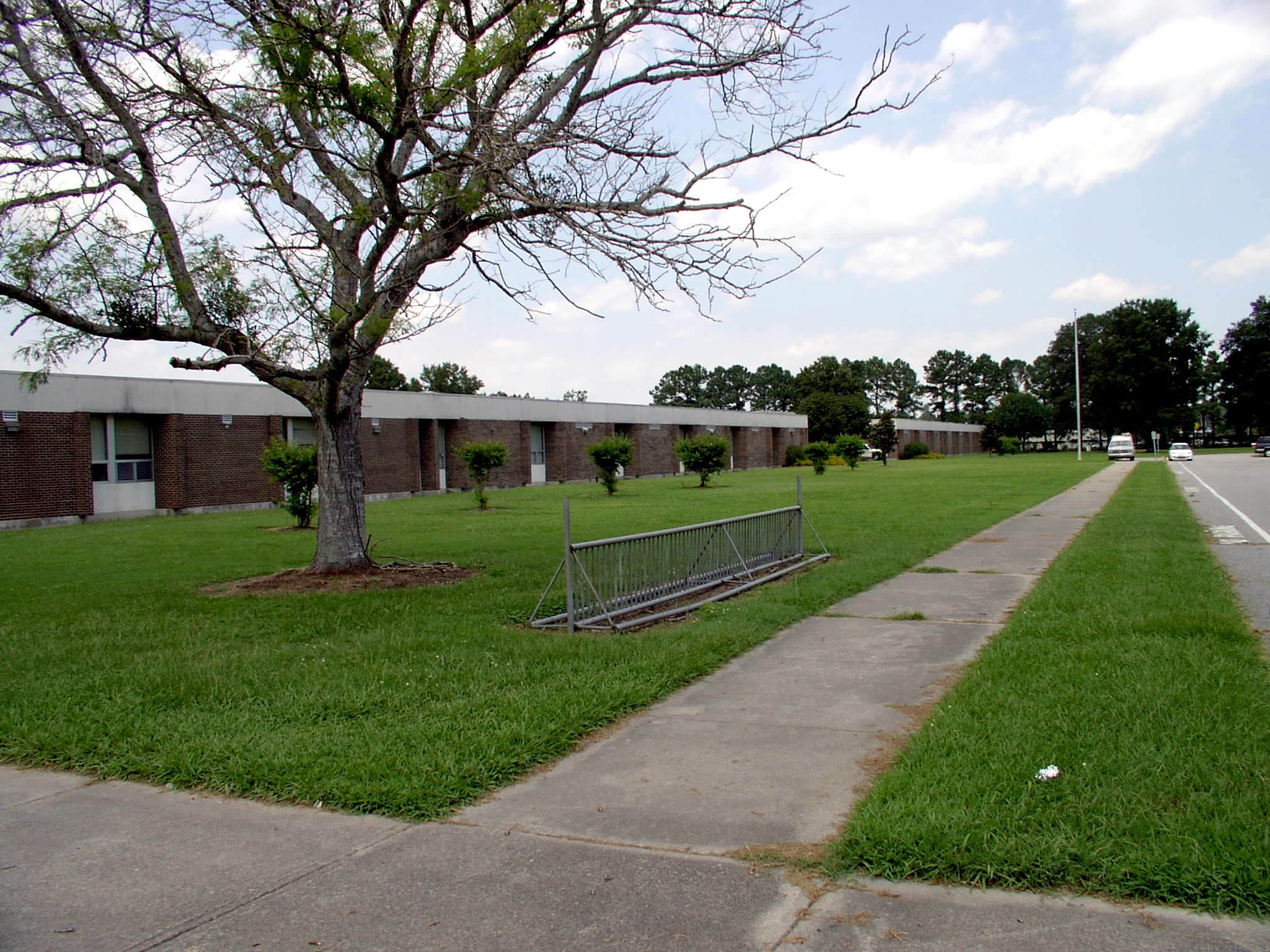
Northeastern High School in Elizabeth City, completed in 1969.

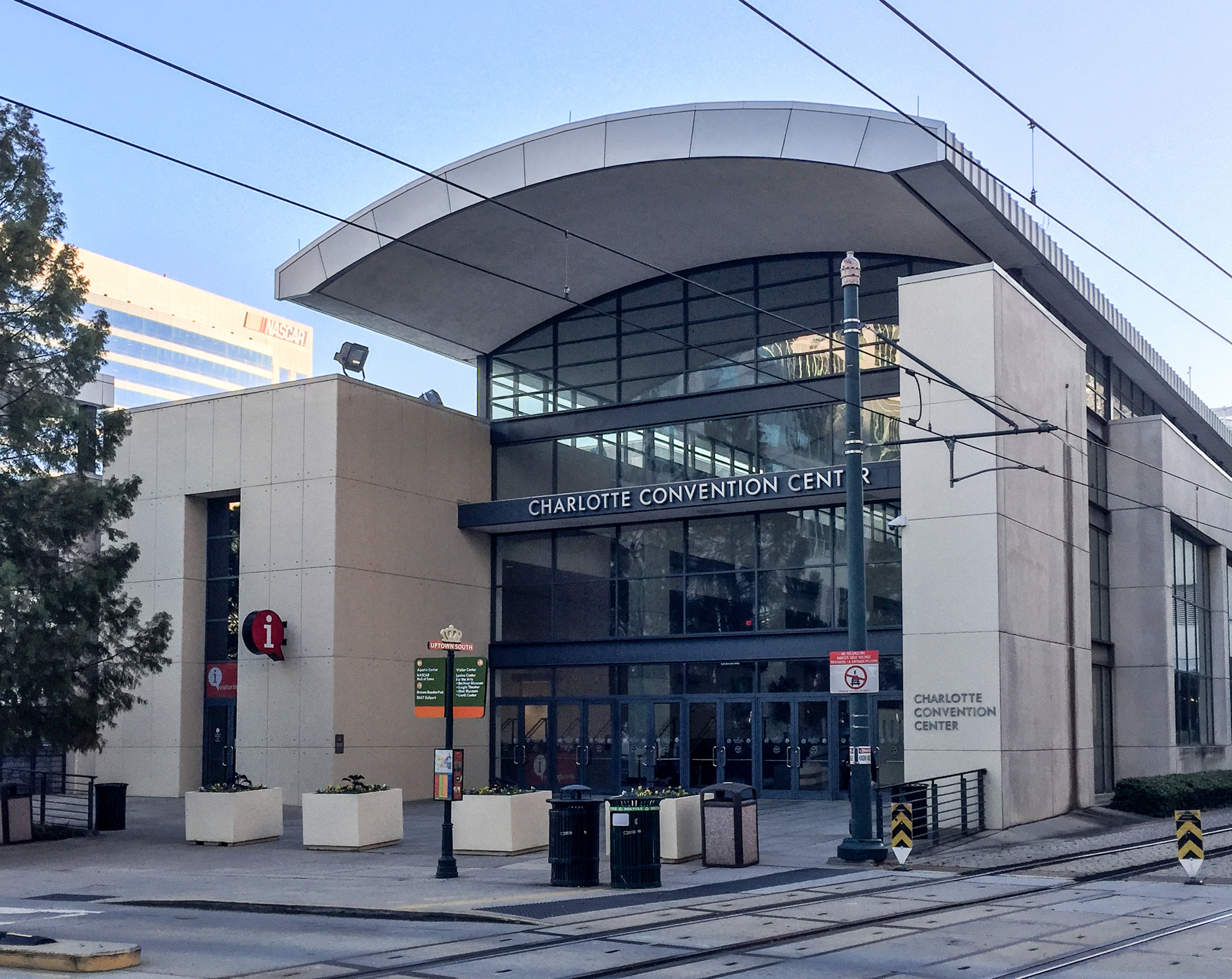
The Charlotte Convention Center, designed by FWA Group and Thompson, Ventulett, Stainback & Associates and completed in 1995.

S. Scott Ferebee Jr. FAIA (1921–2016) was an American architect in practice in Charlotte, North Carolina from 1953 to 1995. In addition to his practice, Ferebee spearheaded the establishment of the School of Architecture at the University of North Carolina at Charlotte in 1971 and was president of the American Institute of Architects for the year 1973.

== Life and career ==
Stephen Scott Ferebee Jr. was born July 30, 1921, in Detroit to Stephen Scott Ferebee and Caroline (Cheatham) Ferebee. The family moved to Henderson, North Carolina, Caroline Ferebee's hometown, in 1925, where Ferebee attended the public schools. In 1938 he enrolled in North Carolina State University (NCSU) as a student of chemical engineering, but his studies were interrupted by World War II. He was commissioned as a second lieutenant of infantry in 1942 and was assigned to the 101st Airborne Division, which participated in the Normandy landings. Ferebee was wounded shortly after D-Day and was evacuated to England to recover. He was discharged in 1946. He then returned to NCSU but changed his major to architecture, graduating in 1948.

Upon graduation, Ferebee joined the firm of A. G. Odell Jr. & Associates, one of the best–known firms in the Charlotte region. He worked on several of Odell's major early projects, including what is now the Bojangles Coliseum, completed in 1955. In 1953, as construction was beginning, Ferebee left to establish an office of his own in partnership with John C. Higgins Jr., another former Odell employee. In 1958 they expanded the partnership to include Herschel G. Walters, and in 1959 Higgins left the partnership, which continued as Ferebee & Walters. In 1964 the firm was reorganized as Ferebee, Walters & Associates and again in 1987 as FWA Group. Ferebee stepped down as chair, president and CEO of the firm in 1990 but continued to practice as an architect in the firm until his retirement in 1995. FWA Group has continued into the present and in 2022 was acquired by Hord Coplan Macht of Baltimore.

Ferebee joined the American Institute of Architects in 1952 as a member of the North Carolina chapter and served as chapter president in 1964. During the 1960s many North Carolina architects were concerned by the high number of NCSU architecture graduates who left the state and in 1965, Ferebee's successor, Leslie N. Boney Jr., appointed him to chair a committee to explore the establishment of a second state architecture school in North Carolina. This committee lobbied the UNC System to establish such a program at the University of North Carolina at Charlotte, which was done in 1971. Ferebee served as the AIA South Atlantic regional director from 1968 to 1971 before being elected first vice president/president-elect for the year 1972 and president for the year 1973. As president Ferebee oversaw the completion of the AIA Headquarters and advocated for the better inclusion of women and people of color in the architectural profession. In 1972 he led a three-week cultural exchange delegation to the Soviet Union and in 1973 led a similar delegation to Poland.

In 1972 Ferebee was an AIA delegate to the International Union of Architects (UIA) congress at Varna. His good reputation with foreign architects led to his election in 1975 to the council of the UIA, a position which he held for six years. During the same period, he was chair of the AIA international relations committee. He served as an AIA delegate to every UIA congress until 1993. He was chancellor of the College of Fellows for the year 1988, and in 1996 led a successful effort to set Charlotte as the location for the 2002 AIA convention.

Ferebee was elected a Fellow of the AIA in 1968 and after his presidency was elected to honorary membership in the Royal Architectural Institute of Canada and the Society of Architects of Mexico. In 1992 he was awarded an honorary Doctor of Fine Arts by the University of North Carolina at Charlotte and was awarded the Wautauga Medal of North Carolina State University and admitted to the Order of the Long Leaf Pine in 2001.

== Personal life ==
Ferebee was married in 1945 to Mary Elizabeth Cooper, an army nurse who had tended to him during his recovery. They had three children and lived in the suburban Montibello neighborhood of Charlotte. Ferebee died November 19, 2016, in Charlotte at the age of 95.

== Architectural works ==
- Matthews Elementary School, 200 E McDowell St, Matthews, North Carolina (1955)
- Lincoln Heights Elementary School (former), 1900 Newcastle St, Charlotte, North Carolina (1956)
- Piedmont High School, 3006 Sikes Mill Rd, Monroe, North Carolina (1959–60)
- Ervin Building, 4037 E Independence Blvd, Charlotte, North Carolina (1964)
- Tarrytown Mall, 300 Tarrytown Center, Rocky Mount, North Carolina (1965, demolished)
- First Ward Elementary School (former), 715 N Caldwell St, Charlotte, North Carolina (1968)
- Northeastern High School, 963 Oak Stump Rd, Elizabeth City, North Carolina (1969)
- Hickory Ridge Mall, 6075 Winchester Rd, Memphis, Tennessee (1981)
- North Carolina State University College of Veterinary Medicine, Raleigh, North Carolina (1981)
- Storrs Hall, (Note: Designed in association with Gwathmey Siegel & Associates Architects of New York City.) University of North Carolina at Charlotte, Charlotte, North Carolina (1990)
- Tower Place, 28 W 4th St, Cincinnati (1991)
- First Baptist Church, 1306 Hampton St, Columbia, South Carolina (1992)
- Charlotte Convention Center, (Note: Designed in association with Thompson, Ventulett, Stainback & Associates of Atlanta.) 501 S College St, Charlotte, North Carolina (1995)
