= Rex Whitaker Allen =

American architect (1914–2008)

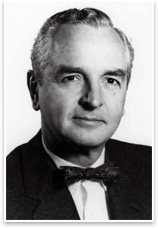
- Born: December 21, 1914; San Francisco
- Died: April 7, 2008 (aged 93); Portland, Oregon
- Occupation: Architect
- Children: Alexandra • Frances • Mark • Suki
- Awards: Fellow of the American Institute of Architects

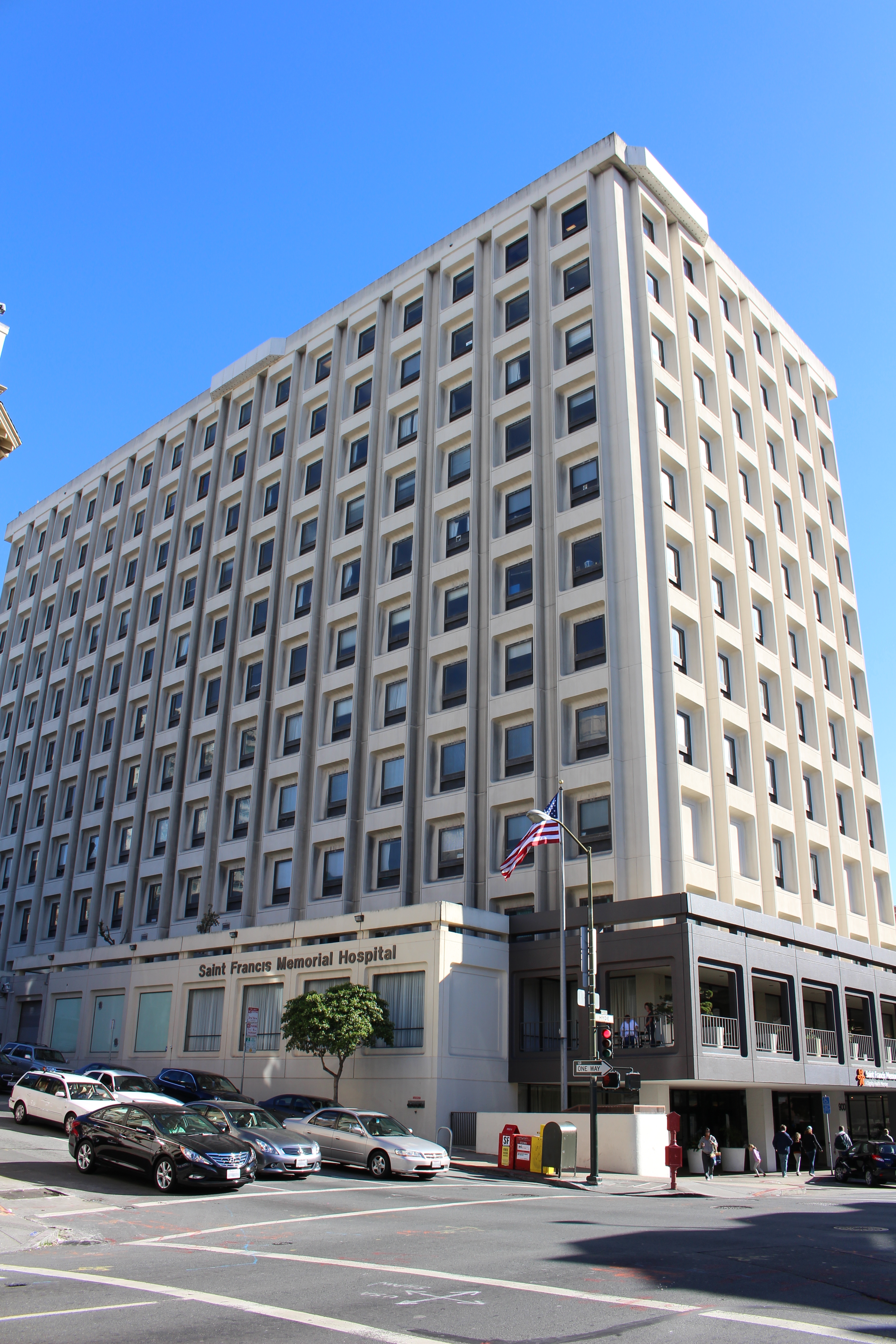
The main building of Saint Francis Memorial Hospital in San Francisco, designed by Rex Whitaker Allen & Associates and completed in 1969.

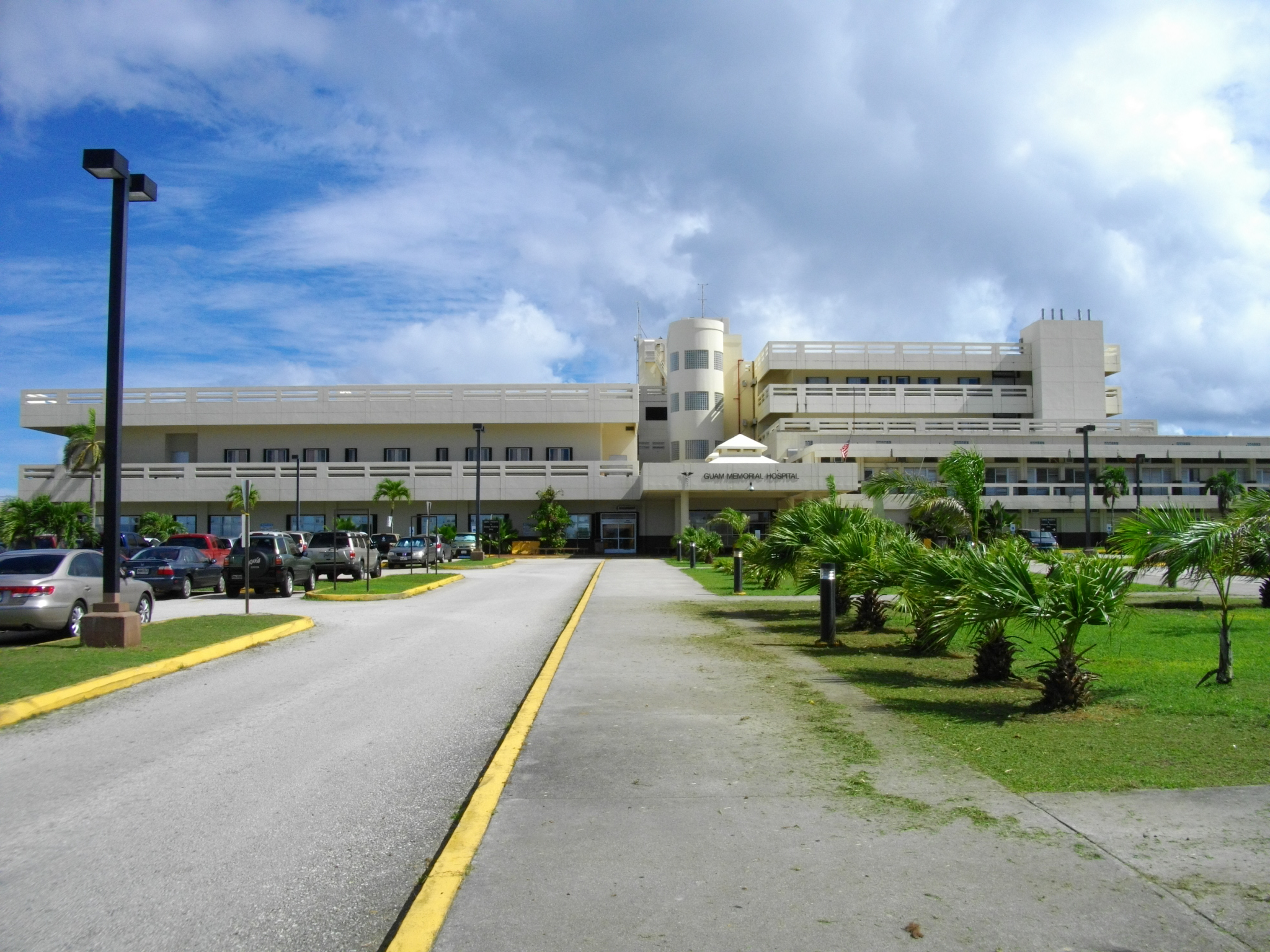
The Guam Memorial Hospital in Tamuning, completed in 1978.

Rex Whitaker Allen FAIA (1914–2008) was an American healthcare architect in practice in San Francisco from 1953 to 1987. He was president of the American Institute of Architects for the year 1969–70.

== Life and career ==
Rex Whitaker Allen was born December 21, 1914, in San Francisco to Lewis Whitaker Allen, a surgeon, and Maude (Rex) Allen. When Allen was four his parents moved the family to the east coast, where he was raised. He was educated at Avon Old Farms and Harvard University, graduating in 1936. He then attended the Harvard Graduate School of Design, graduating in 1939 with an MArch. During World War II he worked for an aircraft parts manufacturer. He worked for Isadore Rosenfield, a noted hospital architect in New York City, before returning to San Francisco in 1949, where he worked for Blanchard & Maher until 1951. In 1952 he formed a partnership with Rosenfield, with offices in San Francisco, though Rosenfield stayed in New York. This partnership was dissolved in 1955, and Allen continued the practice under his own name. While working with Rosenfield, a hospital specialist, Allen found he liked the work and developed his practice along similar lines. Over his career Allen would design more than one hundred hospitals in the United States and its possessions, many of which won design awards. In 1961 he reorganized his firm as Rex Whitaker Allen & Associates and again in 1971 as the Rex Allen Partnership. In 1976, to recognize the addition of partners Richard A. Drever Jr. and Mark A. Lechowski, the firm was renamed Rex Allen–Drever–Lechowski. After Drever withdrew from the firm it was renamed Rex Allen/Mark Lechowski & Associates in 1985, which it remained until Allen's retirement from active practice in 1987.

Allen was the author of the Hospital Planning Handbook, published in 1976 by John Wiley & Sons, which remained an influential reference text for healthcare design for many years.

Allen joined the American Institute of Architects in 1948 as a member of the New York chapter, though he was transferred to the Northern California, later San Francisco, chapter after his move. He served in several chapter offices and in 1961 was appointed to the AIA committee on hospital architecture. He was elected vice president in 1964–66, secretary for 1966–68 before being elected first vice president/president-elect for the year 1968–69 and president for the year 1969–70. As president Allen advocated for better relations between architects and engineers and for environmentalism.

In 1969 Allen was AIA delegate to the International Union of Architects (UIA) congress at Buenos Aires. After his presidency Allen continued in professional service chiefly in international affairs. He was a member of the UIA public health work group from 1971 to 1980, which he chaired from 1979, and on the AIA international relations committee. In 1980 he was elected vice president of the Pan American Federation of Architects' Associations (FPAA), representing the north region until 1984.

Allen was elected a Fellow of the American Institute of Architects in 1966, and after his presidency was elected to honorary membership in the Royal Architectural Institute of Canada and the Society of Architects of Mexico. In 2003 he was awarded the inaugural Lifetime Achievement Award of the American College of Healthcare Architects.

== Personal life ==
Allen was married three times, first to Elizabeth Johnson in 1941, second to Ruth Batchelor in 1949 and third to Bettie J. Crossfield in 1971. His first and second marriages both ended in divorce. He had four children, two with Johnson and two with Batchelor. Before his third marriage, Allen and his family lived in suburban Mill Valley, and thereafter in San Francisco. In 2003 he and his wife moved to Portland, Oregon. He died there April 7, 2008, at the age of 93.

== Architectural works ==
- Kaiser San Francisco Medical Center French campus, (Note: Designed in collaboration with John Carl Warnecke & Associates.) 450 6th Ave, San Francisco (1963)
- Saint Francis Memorial Hospital, 900 Hyde St, San Francisco (1965–69)
- Dominican Hospital, 1555 Soquel Dr, Santa Cruz, California (1968)
- Mercy San Juan Medical Center, 6501 Coyle Ave, Carmichael, California (1968)
- Woodland Memorial Hospital, 1325 Cottonwood St, Woodland, California (1968)
- Highland Hospital, 1411 E 31st St, Oakland, California (1969)
- Memorial Medical Center, 1700 Coffee Rd, Modesto, California (1970)
- Boston Medical Center Yawkey Ambulatory Care Center, (Note: Designed in collaboration with Hugh Stubbins & Associates of Cambridge, Massachusetts.) 850 Harrison Ave, Boston (1971–73)
- Madera Community Hospital, 1250 E Almond Ave, Madera, California (1971)
- Alta Bates Summit Medical Center, 2450 Ashby Ave, Berkeley, California (1972)
- Henry Ford Macomb Hospital, 15855 19 Mile Rd, Clinton Township, Michigan (1975)
- Guam Memorial Hospital, 850 Gov Carlos G Camacho Rd, Tamuning, Guam (1978)
- Commonwealth Health Center, Hinemlu Rd, Garapan, Saipan, Northern Mariana Islands (1986)
- PeaceHealth Sacred Heart Medical Center University District, 1255 Hilyard St, Eugene, Oregon (no date)
