= Architecture Billings Index =

From the American Institute of Architects:

"The Architecture Billings Index is derived from a monthly “Work-on-the-Boards” survey and produced by the AIA Economics & Market Research Group. Based on a comparison of data compiled since the survey’s inception in 1995 with figures from the Department of Commerce on Construction Put in Place, the findings amount to a leading economic indicator that provides an approximately nine to twelve month glimpse into the future of nonresidential construction activity. The diffusion indexes contained in the full report are derived from a monthly survey sent to a panel of AIA member-owned firms. Participants are asked whether their billings increased, decreased, or stayed the same in the month that just ended. According to the proportion of respondents choosing each option, a score is generated, which represents an index value for each month."

The index measures both regional and sector data. Listed below are the regions and sectors covered.

Regions:

- Midwest
- West
- South
- Northeast

Sectors:

- Institutional
- Commercial / Industrial
- Residential
- Mixed Practice
