= Sheraton Kansas City Hotel at Crown Center =

45-story hotel located in the Crown Center complex in Kansas City, Missouri

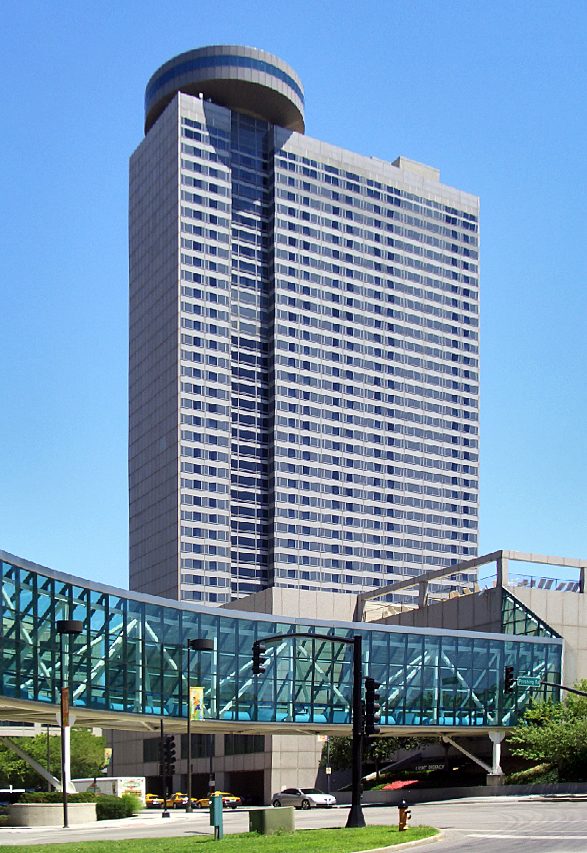
- Sheraton Kansas City Hotel with glass skyway connection to Crown Center.
- Interactive map of the Sheraton Kansas City Hotel at Crown Center area
- Former names: Hyatt Regency Kansas City, Hyatt Regency Crown Center
- Hotel chain: Sheraton

General information
- Location: United States
- Coordinates: 39.085°N 94.580°W
- Opening: July 1, 1980; 46 years ago
- Cost: US$150 million
- Owner: Hallmark Cards
- Operator: Marriott International

Height
- Height: 153.62 m (504.0 ft)

Technical details
- Floor count: 45

Design and construction
- Architects: Edward Larrabee Barnes; PBNDML
- Developer: Crown Center Redevelopment Corporation

Other information
- Number of rooms: 733
- Number of suites: 39

Website
- www.marriott.com/hotels/travel/mcicr-sheraton-kansas-city-hotel-at-crown-center/

The Sheraton Kansas City Hotel at Crown Center is a 504.0 ft (153.62 m), 45-story hotel located in the Crown Center complex in Kansas City, Missouri. It was Missouri's tallest building from 1980 to 1986. It is now the state's sixth-tallest building and Kansas City's third-tallest building.

== History ==
=== Opening ===
The hotel opened on July 1, 1980, as the Hyatt Regency Kansas City. It is part of the Crown Center complex, built by Hallmark Cards, adjacent to their headquarters, and southeast of the Downtown loop, where most of Kansas City's tallest buildings are located.

=== Skywalk collapse ===
On July 17, 1981, 114 people were killed in the Hyatt Regency when the fourth-floor walkway in the atrium collapsed on the second-floor walkway during a tea dance attended by more than 1,600 guests. An investigation revealed that tie rods supporting the walkway did not meet Kansas City building codes.

=== Rebranding and renovations ===
The hotel went through a $5 million reconstruction following the collapse, replacing the skywalks with one large second floor balcony supported by massive pillars, with local authorities saying in 1983 that the building was now "possibly the safest in the country." The hotel was renamed the Hyatt Regency Crown Center in 1987. Starwood took over the hotel November 30, 2011, renaming it the Sheraton Kansas City Hotel at Crown Center the following day and announcing $30 million in renovations and a $5,000 donation to The Skywalk Memorial Foundation.

== Facilities ==
The hotel has 42,860 sq ft (3,982 m^{2}) of function space, a 17,487 sq ft (1,624.6 m^{2}) ballroom and a dedicated exhibit hall with 15,360 sq ft (1,427 m^{2}). It has 733 guestrooms, including 42 suites.

The hotel was formerly topped by a revolving rooftop restaurant, Skies, which closed in 2011 along with the hotel's Peppercorn Duck Club when the hotel became a part of Starwood. The former Skies restaurant reopened as the Sheraton Club Lounge, a private club.
