= Raj Barr-Kumar =

American architect

- Born: Colombo, British Ceylon
- Education: University of Ceylon, University of London, University of Kansas, University of Hawaiʻi
- Occupation: Architect
- Awards: Royal Architecture Institute of Canada 1997- Honorary Fellowship Japan Institute of Architects 1997- Honorary Fellowship Sri Lanka Foundation: 2008- Exceptional Achievement for Sustainable Design and Green Architecture 2014- Lifetime Achievement Award
- Practice: BARR Group International, LLC

Raj Barr-Kumar FAIA FRIBA, also known as Raj Barr, is an American architect, professor of architecture and was the 1997 national president of the American Institute of Architects.

== Personal life and education ==
Raj Barr was born in Colombo, British Ceylon, to Alexander Hamilton Barr-Kumarakulasinghe and Francesca Thanga-Ranee Winslow. The Barr-Kumarakulasinghe family of Jaffna has a history as a family of distinguished professionals, and has long been recognized as "direct descendants of the ancient kings of Jaffna." Raj was educated at the Royal Preparatory School and the Royal College, Colombo where he won the Steward Panel Prize and served as editor of the College Magazine and Prefect.

Raj earned a Bachelor of Science in Architecture and RIBA Part I from the University of Ceylon in 1971. He earned RIBA Part II and a Graduate Diploma in Architecture and Development Planning from the Bartlett School of Architecture at the University of London in 1974. Awarded the Ewart Memorial Scholarship for his performance at the University of London, he earned a Master of Architecture in Urban Design summa cum laude from the University of Kansas in 1975. He earned a Doctorate of Architecture (ArchD.)in Sustainable Design summa cum laude from the University of Hawaii in 2003.

== Career ==
=== Architect ===
Raj began his architectural career in Ceylon working with the firm Panditaratna & Adithya on the Kalutara Bodhiya Temple prior to attending architecture school. He also worked with Geoffrey Bawa RIBA on the Triton Hotel, Valentine Gunasekara RIBA on the Tangalle Bay Hotel and the Catholic Chapel at Tewatte, and Justin Samarasekera RIBA on various projects throughout the county from 1966 to 1971.

After graduating from the University of Ceylon in 1971 Raj moved to Hong Kong and worked with Jon Prescott RIBA on plans for Macau New Town and renovations to the historic Teatro Dom Pedro V. Raj worked for the N-E Metropolitan Regional Hospital Board on York District General Hospital in the United Kingdom in 1972. He joined Llewelyn-Davies Associates in 1973 and worked on The Military Hospital in Baghdad, the Doha Hotel in Qatar, and the Manama Conference Center in Bahrein.

Moving to Kansas City in 1974, Raj worked on the Hyatt Regency Hotel with Patty Berkebile Nelson Associates, The Menninger Foundation sanatorium in Topeka with Kiene & Bradley Associates, and on Rogers New Town, Arkansas with Seligson Associates.

As Senior Designer at Barrett Daffin and Carlin in Tallahassee, Florida, he designed the Suwannee River Water Management District HQ Building in 1979.

In 1981 Raj founded Barr-Kumar Architects Engineers PC and BARR Group International, LLC, commercial and residential architecture and engineering firms based in Washington, D.C., and served as its sole employee.

=== Practice Experience ===
Practice experience includes Cortlandt Medical Center New York, Eco Maya Condominiums in Mexico, Altos Escondidos Eco Development in Panama, Aleid Eco Resort in Saudi Arabia, World Bank HQ, Hilton, Hyatt Regency and Kimpton Hotels; Rasika, Bibiana, Bombay Club and Ardeo Restaurants; the Washington National Cathedral, Masjid Noor and Jain Temple; Trinidad & Tobago, Sri Lanka and Malta Embassies; and numerous custom homes.

=== Educator ===
Raj's career as an educator began at the University of Kansas in 1975 where he served as an assistant professor until 1979. He then served as Director and Tenured associate professor of the Florida Architecture Center in Washington, D.C. from 1979 to 1984.

Raj served as an associate professor in the School of Architecture and Urban Planning at Howard University from 1986 to 1994, and was named Emens Distinguished Visiting professor at Ball State University in 1998. He joined the faculty at The Catholic University of America in 2003 and introduced the first course in sustainability on campus. Raj served as Professor of Practice in the School of Architecture & Planning from 2007 to 2012. Raj taught at the University of the District of Columbia from 2017 to 2020 with the express purpose of helping the Master of Architecture program achieve accreditation. Accredited in 2020, the program at the only public university in DC provides an affordable pathway to becoming a professional and provides upward mobility to many families.

=== Advocate & volunteer ===
Throughout his career as both a practitioner and an educator Raj has attempted to publicly champion the principles of sustainable design as well as innovative approaches to addressing social problems including homelessness.

In 1996, Raj was nationally elected to serve as the National 1997 President of The American Institute of Architects (AIA), a trade organization for architects, and became the first person of color to lead the organization in its 140-year history.

During his tenure, Raj pioneered the annual AIA Legacy Project at the organization's national convention in New Orleans. He called for every AIA National Convention to leave improvements to the built environment of the host city. The first Legacy Project, an $11.5 million, 117,000 sf facility for New Orleans's homeless was called, "A model of cooperation and achievement." The project has been replicated in every host city since 1997, improving schools, community centers, housing, and hospitals.

== Honors and awards ==
Fellowships

- Fellow, American Institute of Architects 1993
- Fellow, Royal Institute of British Architects 2018
- Fellow, Bahamas Institute of Architects 1996
- Hon. Fellow, Architecture Institute of Japan, 1997
- Hon. Fellow, Royal Architecture Institute of Canada, 1997
- Hon. Fellow, Mexico Federation Architects, 1997
- Hon. Fellow, Philippine Institute of Architects, 1998
- Hon. Member, Sri Lanka Institute of Architects, 1998
- Exceptional Achievement, Award For Green Architecture and Sustainable Design, 2008
- Lifetime Achievement Award, SL Foundation, 2014
- Best of DC Architects 2020, 2021

=== Books ===
- Green Architecture: Strategies for Sustainable Design - ISBN 0-9663311-6-8 (2003)
- Sustainable Design Strategies - ISBN 978-0-578-03857-5 (2010)
- Fire Water Sound Motion: Re-thinking Mechanical Systems - ISBN 978-0-578-06907-4 (2011)

=== Articles & Papers (Select) ===
- "The Slum Problem - Is Re-Housing the Answer?" Sunday Times of Ceylon, date month 1968, p. 23
- "Hong Kong High Rise." Asia Magazine, date month 1971, page 19
