= Hyatt Regency walkway collapse =

1981 structural collapse in Kansas City, Missouri

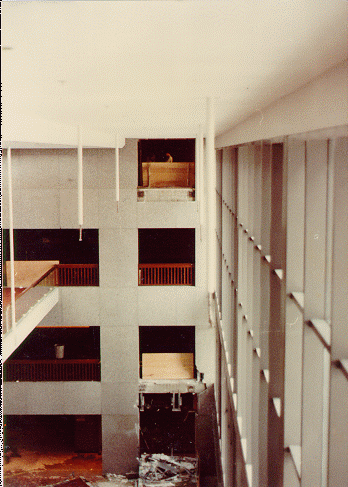
- Original location of second- and fourth-story walkways; the intact third-story walkway can be seen to the left.
- Date: July 17, 1981; 45 years ago
- Time: 7:05 p.m. (CDT)
- Location: Hyatt Regency Kansas City; 2345 McGee Street; Kansas City, Missouri 64108; 39.085°N 94.580°W
- Cause: Structural overload resulting from design flaws
- Deaths: 114
- Injuries: 216

On July 17, 1981, two overhead walkways in the Hyatt Regency Hotel in Kansas City, Missouri, collapsed, killing 114 people and injuring 216. Loaded with partygoers, the concrete and glass platforms crashed onto a tea dance in the lobby. The collapse resulted in billions of dollars of insurance claims, legal investigations, and city government reforms.

The hotel had been built just a few years before, during a nationwide pattern of fast-tracked large construction with reduced oversight and major failures. Its roof had partially collapsed during construction, and the ill-conceived skywalk design progressively degraded due to a miscommunication loop of corporate neglect and irresponsibility. An investigation concluded that it would have failed under one-third of the weight it held that night. Convicted of gross negligence, misconduct and unprofessional conduct, the engineering company lost its national affiliation and all engineering licenses in four states, but was acquitted of criminal charges. Company owner and engineer of record Jack D. Gillum eventually claimed full responsibility for the collapse and its unchecked design flaws, and he became an engineering disaster lecturer.

The disaster contributed many lessons and reforms to engineering ethics and safety, and to emergency management. It was the deadliest non-deliberate structural failure since the collapse of Pemberton Mill over 120 years earlier, and remained the second deadliest structural collapse in the United States until the collapse of the World Trade Center towers 20 years later.

== Background ==
The Kansas City Star described the national climate of the late 1970s as "high unemployment, inflation and double-digit interest rates [that added] pressure on builders to win contracts and complete projects swiftly". Described by the newspaper as fast-tracked, construction began in May 1978 on the 40-story Hyatt Regency Kansas City. There were numerous delays and setbacks, including the collapse of 2,700 square feet (250 m^{2}) of the roof. The newspaper observed that "Notable structures around the country were failing at an alarming rate", which included the 1979 Kemper Arena roof collapse and the 1978 Hartford Civic Center roof collapse. The hotel officially opened on July 1, 1980.

The hotel's lobby was its defining feature, with a multi-story atrium spanned by elevated walkways suspended from the ceiling. The walkways were constructed with steel, glass and concrete. These crossings connected the second, third and fourth floors between the north and south wings. The walkways were about 120 feet (37 m) long and weighed about 64,000 pounds (29,000 kg). The fourth-level walkway was directly above the second-level walkway.

== Collapse ==
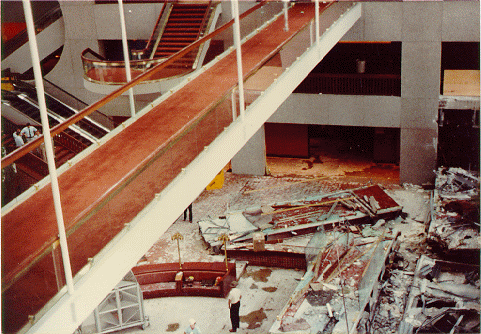
Lobby floor, during the first day of the investigation. The third-floor walkway shows the comparable three pairs of tie-rods holding its support beams, which failed on the fourth-floor walkway.

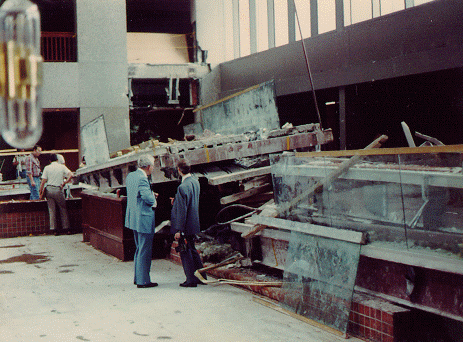
The landing of the concrete fourth-floor walkway, atop the crowded second-floor walkway

Hyatt Regency hotels in business districts had taken to hosting Friday after-work tea dances in their soaring atrium areas. About 1,600 people gathered in the Kansas City hotel's atrium for such a dance on the evening of Friday, July 17, 1981. The second-level walkway held about 40 people at about 7:05 p.m., with more on the third and an additional 16 to 20 on the fourth. The fourth-floor bridge was suspended directly over the second-floor bridge, with the third-floor walkway offset several yards from the others. Guests heard popping noises and a loud crack moments before the fourth-floor walkway dropped several inches, paused, then fell completely onto the second-floor walkway. Both walkways then fell to the crowded lobby floor. A diner at the 42nd-floor revolving restaurant atop the Hyatt said it felt like an explosion.

The rescue operation lasted 14 hours, directed by Kansas City emergency medical director Joseph Waeckerle. Survivors were buried beneath the walkways' many tons of steel, concrete and glass, which the fire department's jacks could not move. Volunteers responded to an appeal and brought jacks, flashlights, compressors, jackhammers, concrete saws and generators from construction companies and suppliers. They also brought cranes and forced the booms through the lobby windows to lift debris. Deputy Fire Chief Arnett Williams recalled this immediate outpouring from the industrial community: "They said 'take what you want'. I don't know if all those people got their equipment back. But no one has ever asked for an accounting and no one has ever submitted a bill."

The dead were taken to a ground-floor exhibition area as a makeshift morgue, and the hotel's driveway and lawn were used as a triage area. Able survivors were instructed to leave the hotel to simplify the rescue effort, and morphine was given to the mortally injured. Blood centers quickly received lineups of hundreds of donors. The Life Line helicopter pilot compared the carnage to the Vietnam War but in greater numbers.

Visibility was poor because of dust and because the power had been cut to prevent fires. Water from the hotel's ruptured sprinkler system flooded the lobby and put trapped survivors at risk of drowning. The final rescued victim, Mark Williams, spent more than nine hours pinned underneath the lower skywalk with both legs dislocated and having nearly drowned before the water was shut off.

== Casualties ==
A total of 114 were killed and 216 injured, 29 of whom were rescued from the rubble. Rescuers often had to dismember bodies to reach survivors among the wreckage. A surgeon spent 20 minutes amputating one victim's pinned and unsalvageable leg with a chainsaw; that victim later died.

== Investigation ==
The original design vis-à-vis the final construction of the fourth-floor walkway support system. The revised design doubled the force on the nut, and hence on the welded joint of the beams which split.

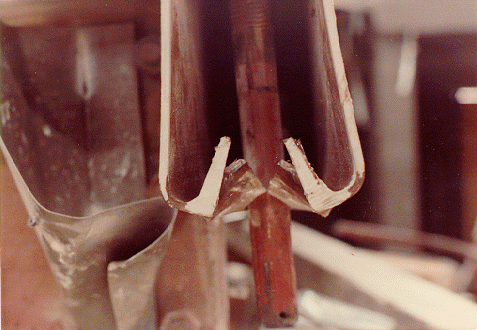
A cross-section of the fourth-floor support beam that fell, together with the second-floor support rod passing through its left and right halves vertically

The Kansas City Star hired architectural engineer Wayne G. Lischka and national engineering firm Simpson, Gumpertz, and Heger Inc. to investigate the collapse, and Lischka discovered a change to the original design of the walkways. Within days, a laboratory at Lehigh University began testing box beams on behalf of the steel fabrication source. The Missouri licensing board, the state attorney general and Jackson County investigated the collapse over the following years. Edward Pfrang, lead investigator for the National Bureau of Standards, characterized the neglectful corporate culture surrounding the entire Hyatt construction project as "everyone wanting to walk away from responsibility". The NBS's final report cited structural overload resulting from design flaws where "the walkways had only minimal capacity to resist their own weight". Pfrang concluded they would have failed with one-third of the occupants' weight.

Investigators found that the collapse was the result of changes to the design of the walkway's steel hanger rods. The two walkways were suspended from a set of 1.25-inch-diameter (32 mm) steel hanger rods, with the second-floor walkway hanging directly under the fourth-floor walkway. The fourth-floor walkway platform was supported on three cross-beams suspended by the steel rods retained by nuts. The cross-beams were box girders made from 8-inch-wide (200 mm) C-channel strips welded together lengthwise, with a hollow space between them. The original design by Jack D. Gillum and Associates specified three pairs of rods running from the second-floor walkway to the ceiling, passing through the beams of the fourth-floor walkway, with a nut at the middle of each tie rod tightened up to the bottom of the fourth-floor walkway, and a nut at the bottom of each tie rod tightened up to the bottom of the second-floor walkway. This original design supported 60% of the minimum load required by Kansas City building codes.

Havens Steel Company had manufactured the rods, and the company noted that the whole rod below the fourth floor would have to be threaded in order to screw on the nuts to hold the fourth-floor walkway in place. These threads would be subject to damage as the fourth-floor structure was hoisted into place. Havens Steel proposed that two separate and offset sets of rods be used: the first set suspending the fourth-floor walkway from the ceiling, and the second set suspending the second-floor walkway from the fourth-floor walkway.

This design change would be fatal. In the original design, the beams of the fourth-floor walkway had to support the weight of the fourth-floor walkway, with the weight of the second-floor walkway supported completely by the rods. In the revised design, however, the fourth-floor beams supported both the fourth- and second-floor walkways, but were only strong enough for 30% of that load.

The serious flaws of the revised design were compounded by the fact that both designs placed the bolts directly through a welded joint connecting two C-channels, the weakest structural point in the box beams. Photographs of the wreckage show excessive deformations of the cross-section. During the failure, the box beams split along the weld and the nut supporting them slipped through the resulting gap, which was consistent with reports that the upper walkway at first fell several inches, after which the nut was held by the upper side of the box beams; then the upper side of the box beams failed as well, allowing the entire walkway to fall in a cascading failure. A court order was required to retrieve the skywalk pieces from storage for examination.

Investigators concluded that the underlying problem was a lack of proper communication between Jack D. Gillum and Associates and Havens Steel. In particular, the drawings prepared by Gillum and Associates were preliminary sketches, but Havens Steel interpreted them as finalized drawings. Gillum and Associates failed to review the initial design thoroughly, and engineer Daniel M. Duncan accepted Havens Steel's proposed plan via a phone call without performing necessary calculations or viewing sketches that would have revealed its serious intrinsic flaws—in particular, doubling the load on the fourth-floor beams. Reports and court testimony cited a feedback loop of architects' unverified assumptions, each having believed that someone else had performed calculations and checked reinforcements but without any actual root in documentation or review channels. Onsite workers had neglected to report noticing beams bending, and instead rerouted their heavy wheelbarrows around the unsteady walkways.

Jack D. Gillum would later reflect that the design flaw was one that "any first-year engineering student could figure it out," if it had been checked.

== Legal ==
The Missouri Board of Architects, Professional Engineers and Land Surveyors found the engineers at Jack D. Gillum and Associates who had approved the final drawings to be culpable of gross negligence, misconduct, and unprofessional conduct in the practice of engineering. They were acquitted of all the crimes with which they were initially charged, but the company lost its engineering licenses in Missouri, Kansas and Texas, and lost its membership with the American Society of Civil Engineers.

In the months after the disaster, more than 300 lawsuits sought a cumulative total of $3 billion (equivalent to $10.6 billion in 2025). Of this, at least $140 million (equivalent to $496 million in 2025) was actually awarded to victims and their families, under hotel owner Crown Center Redevelopment Corporation. The single largest award was about $12 million, for a victim who required full-time medical care. A class-action lawsuit seeking punitive damages was won against Crown Center Corporation, a subsidiary of Hallmark Cards. That lawsuit yielded $10 million, including $6.5 million dedicated as donations to charitable and civic endeavors that Hallmark called a "healing gesture to help Kansas City put the tragedy of the skywalks' collapse behind it." Each of the approximately 1,600 hotel occupants from that night was unconditionally offered $1,000, and 1,300 of them accepted by the deadline. Every defendant—including Hallmark Cards, Crown Center Corporation, architects, engineers, and the contractor—denied all legal liability, including that of the egregious engineering faults.

== Aftermath ==
The hotel's atrium was redesigned, replacing the second-floor walkway with one supported by columns and removing the other walkways permanently, reinforcing the roof and making other changes to the building's infrastructure. The Hyatt Regency reopened on October 1, 1981, the same day that a committee of engineers and architects concluded that there were no other structural safety issues with the building. In 1983, local authorities reported that the $5 million hotel reconstruction made the building "possibly the safest in the country." The hotel was renamed the Hyatt Regency Crown Center in 1987, and the Sheraton Kansas City at Crown Center in 2011. It has been renovated numerous times since, though the lobby retains a similar layout and design. Other Hyatt hotels quickly stopped hosting tea dances.

The overhead walkways in the atrium of the Wainwright Building in St. Louis, which Gillum had designed around the same time as the Hyatt Regency walkways, were also examined. The Wainwright Building walkways were deemed in good condition.

The New York Times said the victims were soon overshadowed by the community's daily preoccupation with the disaster and its polarized attitude of blame-seeking and "vendetta" that soon targeted the local newspapers, judges and lawyers: "Seldom has a city's establishment been so emotionally torn by catastrophe as Kansas City's was". The owner of the Kansas City Star Company guessed that the huge victim count ensured that "virtually half the town was affected directly or indirectly by the horror of the tragedy". The newspaper generated 16 months' worth of Pulitzer Prize–winning investigative coverage of the disaster—putting the newspaper at odds with the Kansas City community in general, including the management of Hallmark Cards, the parent company of the hotel's owner.

Several rescuers suffered considerable stress due to their experience and later relied upon each other in an informal support group.

== Legacy ==
The world responded to the Hyatt disaster by upgrading the culture and academic curriculum of engineering ethics and emergency management. In this respect, the event joins the legacies of the 1984 Bhopal disaster, the 1986 Space Shuttle Challenger disaster and the 1986 Chernobyl disaster.

The disaster provides a case study teaching first responders the "all-hazards approach" to multiple disciplines across jurisdictions, and teaching university students in engineering ethics classes how the smallest personal responsibility can affect the biggest projects with the worst possible results.

[The skywalk design] is one of the worst examples of people trying to push off their responsibilities to other parts of the team ... Since the Hyatt, there has been a lot of activity in the engineering profession to address quality, the final product and how you attain quality. The steps taken after the Hyatt helped the industry recover from failure.

— Paul Munger, chairman of the Missouri architectural board

The American Society of Civil Engineers adopted a clear policy—which carries weight in court—that structural engineers are now ultimately responsible for reviewing shop drawings by fabricators. Trade groups such as the ASCE issued investigations, improved standards of peer review, sponsored seminars and created trade manuals for the improvement of professional standards and public confidence. The Kansas City Codes Administration became its own department, doubling its staff and dedicating a single engineer comprehensively to all aspects of each reviewed building. Kansas City politics and government were colored for years with investigations against corruption. In 1983, the disaster was cited in the argument against the Reagan administration's attempt to eliminate an agency of the National Bureau of Standards.

The Kansas City Star and its associated publication the Kansas City Times won a Pulitzer Prize in 1982 for their 16 months of investigative coverage of the collapse.

Local rock band The Rainmakers memorialized the event five years later in the song "Rockin' at the T-Dance" from their debut album. The song discusses American disasters caused by proven design flaws including the Apollo 1 and Apollo 13 accidents. Lyrics from the song then turn to the Hyatt: "Take a trip with me to Kansas City MO/To the Hyatt House, to the big dance floor/You can still see the ghosts/But you can′t see the sense/Why they let the monkey go/And blamed the monkey wrench."

A memorial was dedicated by Skywalk Memorial Foundation, a nonprofit organization established for victims of the collapse, on November 12, 2015, in Hospital Hill Park across the street from the hotel. It included a $25,000 donation from Hallmark Cards.

Jack D. Gillum (1928–2012), the owner of the engineering company and an engineer of record for the Hyatt project, occasionally lectured at engineering conferences for years after the tragedy. Claiming full responsibility and disturbed by his memories "365 days a year", he said he wanted "to scare the daylights out of them" in the hope of preventing future mistakes.

== See also ==
- Engineering disasters
- Erfurt latrine disaster, a floor collapse that occurred on 26 July 1184
- List of structural failures and collapses
- Versailles wedding hall disaster, a similar incident that occurred 2001 that was also due to insufficient load capacity as a result of flawed structural design
