= Tea dance =

Type of social gathering

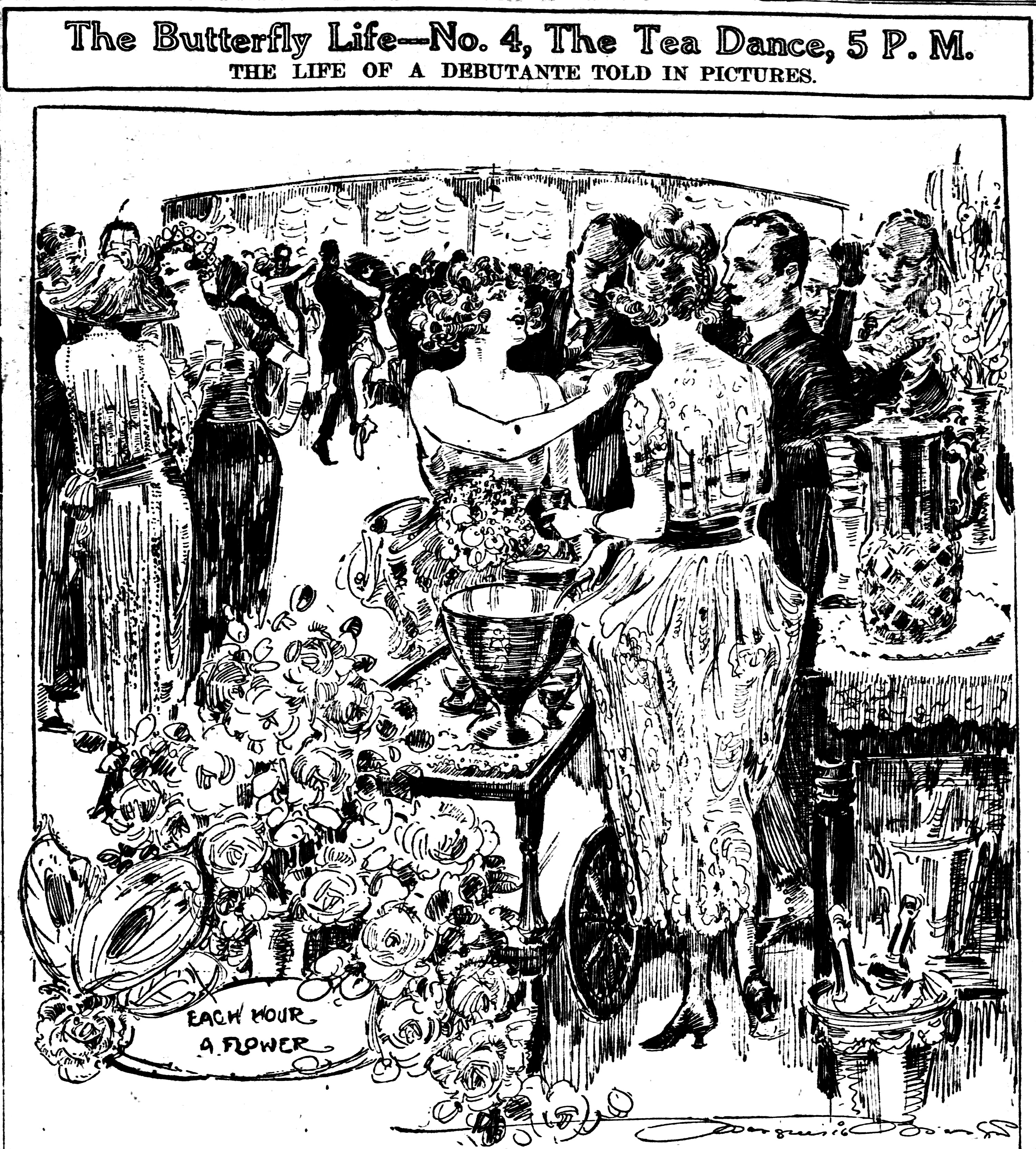
A tea dance in St. Louis, Missouri, as drawn by artist-reporter Marguerite Martyn in 1920

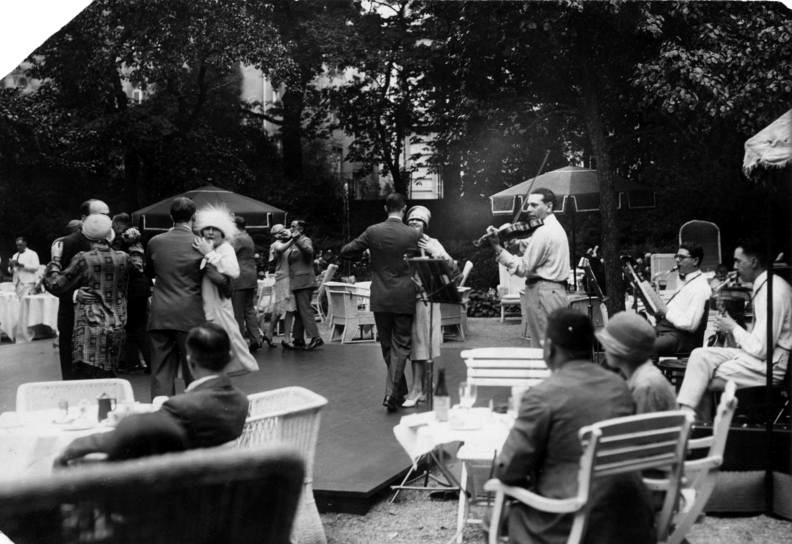
A jazz band at the tea dance in Hotel Esplanade Berlin, 1926

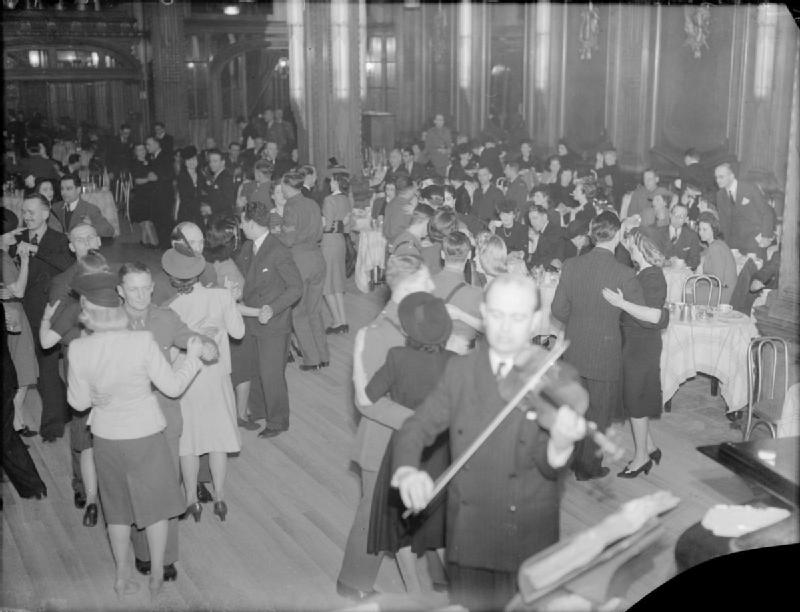
A tea dance in progress somewhere in the West End of London, Spring 1941; a violinist plays in the foreground

A tea dance, also called a thé dansant (French for 'dancing tea'), was a dance held in the summer or autumn from 4 to 7 p.m. In the English countryside, a garden party sometimes preceded the dance. The function grew out of the afternoon tea tradition, and J. Pettigrew traces its origin to the French colonization of Morocco.

Books on Victorian-era etiquette included detailed instructions for hosting such gatherings, such as Party-giving on Every Scale (London, n.d. [1880]), which notes that "afternoon dances are seldom given in London, but are a popular form of entertainment in the suburbs, in garrison-towns, watering-places, etc." Royal Navy officers hosted tea dances aboard ships at various naval stations, the expenses being shared by the captain and officers, as they were shared by colonels and officers at barrack dances in mess rooms ashore.

The usual refreshments in 1880 were tea and coffee, ices, champagne-cup and claret-cup, fruit, sandwiches, cake, and biscuits. The expected feature was a live orchestra or a small band playing light classical music, even after the invention of the phonograph. The dances included waltzes, tangos, and the Charleston by the late 1920s. They also offset the expenses of a seated supper, wine, and candles associated with a ball. A stiff waxed canvas dancing cloth was considered sufficient when strained over the drawing-room carpet, rather than taking up the carpet and waxing the floor in preparation for dancing. The dining room served as the tea room, with the dining tables arranged at one end as a buffet. Floral decorations were modest.

== World records ==
Four world-record tea dances have been held in the early 21st century. In Glasgow in December 2008, some 408 dancers gained the record during the city's Winterfest celebrations. The programme of music for the event was provided by the Scottish swing-dance band That Swing Sensation, with dance hosts the Fly Right Dance Company. The previous record was set in 2005 by a total of 195 couples, who danced in London's Trafalgar Square.

Subsequently, the Royal Opera House in London held a world record attempt on 8 July 2010 in Trafalgar Square, with the unofficial total being 507 dancers.

Glasgow's George Square was the venue for the established world record, set on 12 September 2010, with 4,000 dancers.

== In popular culture ==
Tea dances are a common cultural reference in early 20th-century British and American fiction as a staple of genteel society. Literary characters normally attend these receptions while visiting resort towns, especially coastal ones such as Brighton, The Hamptons, Provincetown, and Ogunquit. Episode two in season four of Downton Abbey features two characters attending a tea dance in York, England, in the 1920s. The 1925 Broadway musical No, No, Nanette features a tea dance as the occasion for the plot's climax, when the main characters travel to Atlantic City, New Jersey. The term has been broadened in the United States since the late 20th century to refer to any casual afternoon dance event.

== See also ==
- Hyatt Regency walkway collapse, a structural failure occurred during a hotel tea dance event with over 1,500 people attending.
- Palm court
- Tea (meal)
- Tea party
