= American Institute of Architects =

Professional association for architects

Coordinates: 38°53′46″N 77°02′30″W

The American Institute of Architects
- Abbreviation: AIA
- Formation: 1857; 169 years ago
- Type: Nonprofit
- Purpose: Architectural profession
- Professional title: AIA
- Headquarters: Washington, D.C., U.S.
- Region served: United States
- Members: 100,000+
- Website: aia.org

The American Institute of Architects (AIA) is a professional organization for architects in the United States. It is headquartered in Washington, D.C. AIA offers education, government advocacy, community redevelopment, and public outreach programs, and collaborates with other stakeholders in the design and construction industries.. While many US-based architects are members of the AIA, it is not a professional requirement.

== History ==
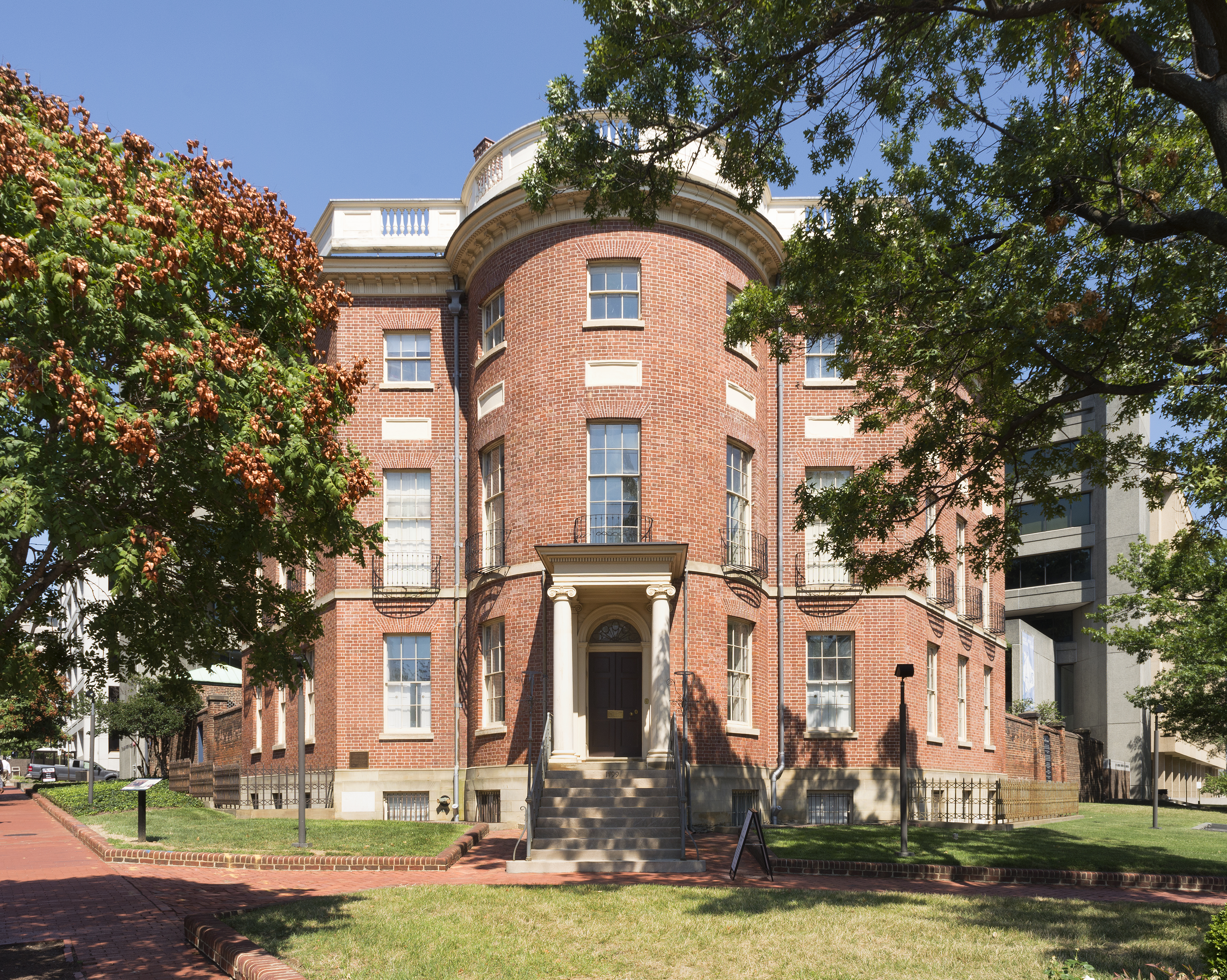
The Octagon House in Washington, D.C., built in 1799 and owned by Architects Foundation (AIA Foundation)

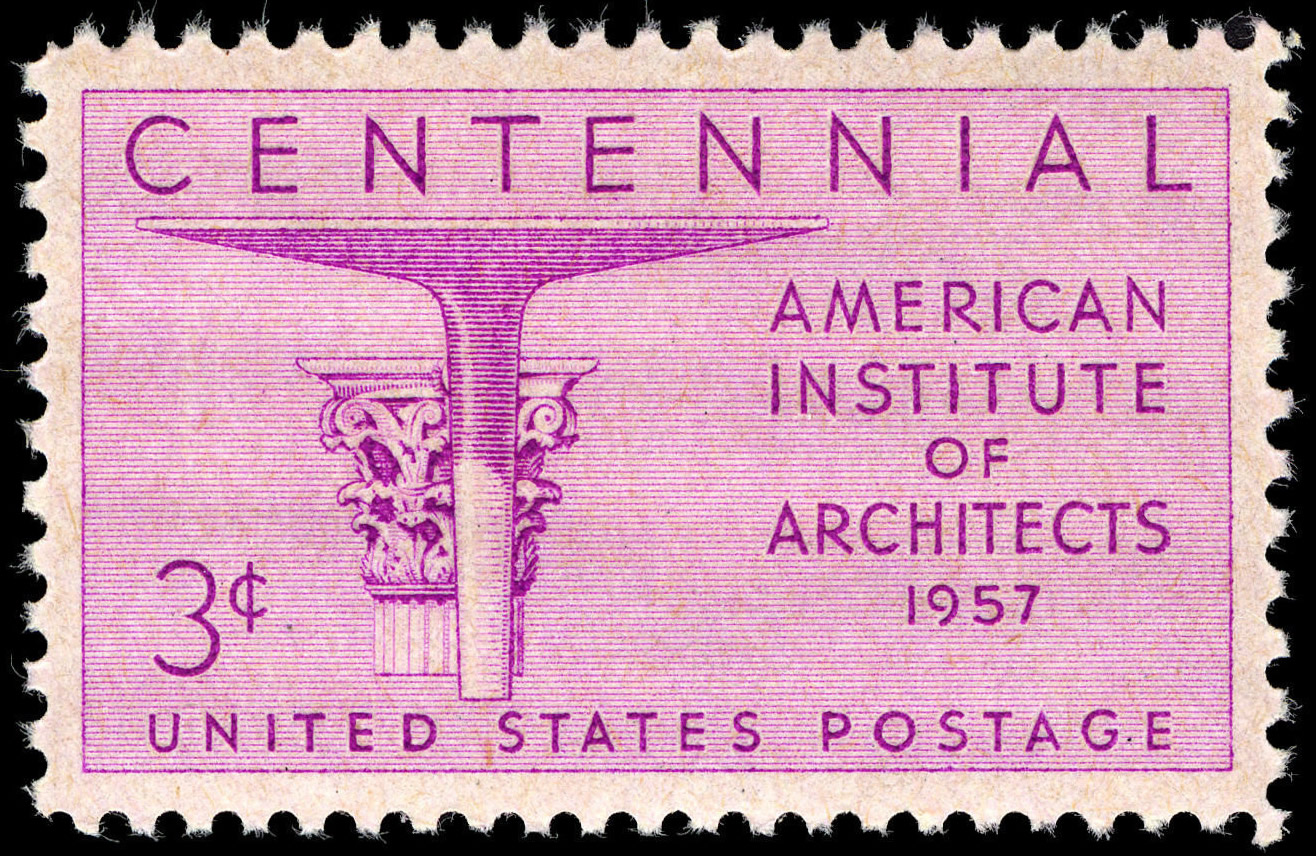
1957 stamp commemorating the AIA's centennial

The American Institute of Architects (AIA) was founded in 1857 in New York City by a group of thirteen architects. The founding members include Charles Babcock, Henry W. Cleaveland, Henry Dudley, Leopold Eidlitz, Edward Gardiner, Richard Morris Hunt, Detlef Lienau, Fred A. Petersen, Jacob Wrey Mould, John Welch, Richard M. Upjohn, and Joseph C. Wells, with Richard Upjohn serving as the first president. They held their inaugural meeting on February 23, 1857, and invited 16 additional architects to join, including Alexander Jackson Davis, Thomas U. Walter, Frederick Clarke Withers, and Calvert Vaux. There were no architectural schools or licensing laws in the United States at the time, allowing anyone to claim to be an architect.

By March 10, 1857, they had drafted a constitution and bylaws under the name New York Society of Architects. The name was later changed to The American Institute of Architects at the suggestion of Thomas U. Walter. On April 15, 1857, the members signed the new constitution, having previously filed a certificate of incorporation two days earlier. The following year, the constitution was amended to include the mission of promoting the artistic, scientific, and practical aspects of architecture, facilitating professional interaction and camaraderie, raising the profession's standing, and uniting architects for the advancement of the field.

In the 1860s, architects from other cities began joining AIA. By the 1880s, chapters had been established in Albany, Baltimore, Boston, Chicago, Cincinnati, Indianapolis, Philadelphia, Rhode Island, San Francisco, St. Louis, and Washington, D.C. As of 2008, AIA boasts over 200 chapters.

In 1898, the AIA moved into its new national headquarters in the historic Octagon House, in Washington, D.C. AIA rented the building for 4 years, and then purchased it in 1902. Under president of the AIA, D. Everett Waid, in 1926–1927, a plan was designed and then "approved to preserve the Octagon’s smokehouse and stables and to build offices and a library" behind the existing Octagon House but the construction was delayed until 1940 after Waid donated $300,000 to the AIA to commence the work largely to his design specifications.

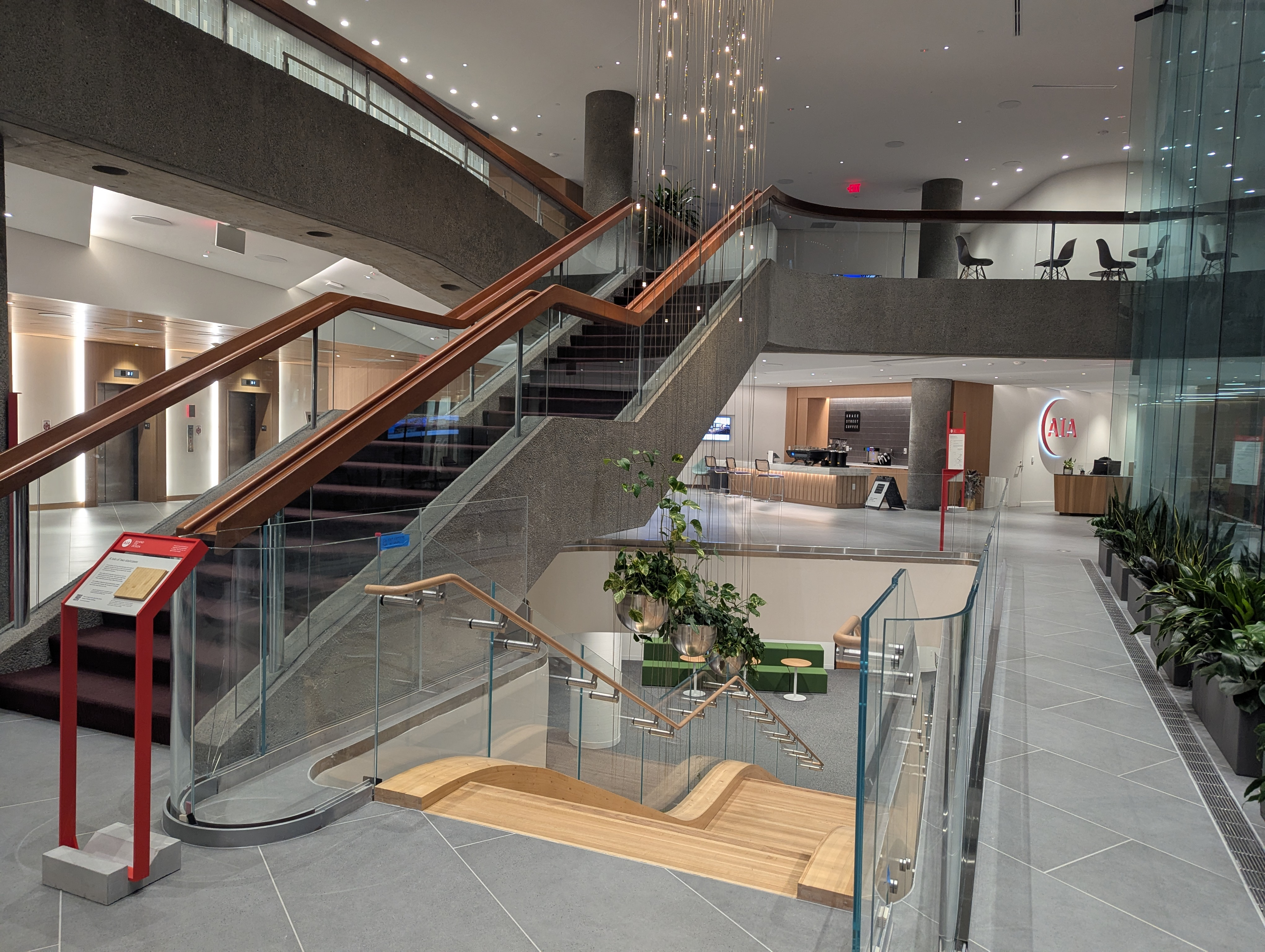
1735 New York Avenue NW following a renovation

In the mid-1960s, a design competition was held to select an architect for a new AIA headquarters to be located at 1735 New York Avenue NW, in Washington, D.C. Mitchell Giurgola Architects won the competition but failed to gain approval from the United States Commission of Fine Arts for the design concept. Subsequently, the firm resigned from the commission, and The Architects Collaborative (TAC) was chosen to redesign the building. Led by TAC principals Norman Fletcher and Howard Elkus, the design was ultimately approved in 1970 and completed in 1973.

AIA's headquarters also serves as the home of the American Institute of Architecture Students, the Association of Collegiate Schools of Architecture, and the National Architectural Accrediting Board.

== Organization ==
=== Membership ===
The American Institute of Architects (AIA) has a membership of over 100,000 licensed architects and associated professionals. AIA members adhere to a code of ethics and professional conduct designed to demonstrate commitment to upholding the highest standards in professional practice and dedication.

AIA offers membership at five different levels:

1. Architect members (AIA): These individuals are licensed to practice architecture by a recognized licensing authority in the United States.
2. Associate members (Assoc. AIA): While they do not hold a license to practice architecture, associate members work under the supervision of an architect in a professional or technical capacity. They may have earned professional degrees in architecture, work as faculty members in architecture programs, or be interns earning credit toward licensure.
3. International associate members: This category is for individuals who hold an architecture license or its equivalent from a licensing authority outside the United States.
4. Emeritus members: These members have maintained AIA membership for 15 consecutive years and are either at least 70 years old or incapacitated and unable to work in the architecture profession.
5. Allied members: Allied members are professionals whose work is related to the building and design communities. This includes engineers, landscape architects, planners, and senior executive staff from building and design-related companies, such as publishers, product manufacturers, and research firms. Allied membership represents a partnership between the AIA and the American Architectural Foundation.

AIA's most esteemed recognition is the Fellow of The American Institute of Architects (FAIA) designation. This honor is awarded to members who have made nationally significant contributions to the profession. Approximately 2% of all members, or slightly more than 2,600 individuals, have been elevated to the AIA College of Fellows. Prominent foreign architects may also be elected as Honorary Fellows of AIA, gaining recognition within the college.

=== Structure ===
AIA operates under the governance of a board of directors and maintains a staff of nearly 200 employees. While AIA serves as a national organization, its reach is extended through its 217 local and state chapters. Chapters span the United States and its territories. AIA components also operate in several international locations, including the United Kingdom, Continental Europe, the Middle East, Japan, Hong Kong, Shanghai, and Canada. These chapters offer programming and direct services to support AIA members at various stages of their professional careers.

In June 2013, The American Institute of Architects unveiled the "Designing Recovery" initiative during CGI America, an annual event of the Clinton Global Initiative. This initiative involved a design contest conducted in partnership with charitable organizations such as Make It Right, SBP, and Architecture for Humanity. The contest focused on single-family housing designs aimed at enhancing the quality, diversity, and resilience of housing in each community. The portfolio of designs, including those from non-winning entries, was made available to communities recovering from natural disasters. Dow Building Solutions sponsored the contest, providing a total prize money of $30,000. The prize was equally distributed among three winning designs from New Orleans, Louisiana; Joplin, Missouri; and New York City.

=== Professionalism ===
AIA members actively contribute to their profession and communities by participating in various professional interest areas, ranging from design to regional and urban development. They also engage with professional academies that foster the generation of new ideas and responses. Local components provide support to younger professionals through programs such as the Intern Development Program, Architect Registration Exam preparation courses, and employment referral services.

AIA organizes the AIA Conference on Architecture & Design, held annually in late spring or early summer, which attracts the largest gathering of architects worldwide.

=== Public education ===
AIA attempts to meet the needs and interests of the nation's architects and the public by raising public awareness of the value of architecture and the importance of good design. To mark AIA's 150th anniversary and to showcase how members have helped shape the built environment, AIA and Harris Interactive released findings from a public poll that asked Americans to name their favorite 150 works of architecture, America's Favorite Architecture.

=== Honors and awards ===
AIA recognizes individuals and organizations for outstanding achievements in support of the architecture profession and AIA. Awards include the Next LA Merit Award, the Next Design Award, and the Next Design Honor Award.

== Presidents ==
The following individuals served as presidents, all of whom were elevated to Fellows of the American Institute of Architects:

- Richard Upjohn 1857–1876
- Thomas Ustick Walter 1877–1887
- Richard Morris Hunt 1888–1891
- Edward Hale Kendall 1892–1893
- Daniel H. Burnham 1894–1895
- George Browne Post 1896–1898
- Henry Van Brunt 1899–1900
- Robert Swain Peabody 1900–1901
- Charles Follen McKim 1902–1903
- William S. Eames 1904–1905
- Frank Miles Day 1906–1907
- Cass Gilbert 1908–1909
- Irving Kane Pond 1910–1911
- Walter Cook 1912–1913
- Richard Clipston Sturgis 1913–1915
- John Lawrence Mauran 1915–1918
- Thomas Rogers Kimball 1918–1920
- Henry H. Kendall 1920–1922
- William B. Faville 1922–1924
- Dan Everett Waid 1924–1926
- Milton Bennett Medary 1926–1928
- Charles Herrick Hammond 1928–1930
- Robert D. Kohn 1930–1932
- Ernest John Russell 1932–1935
- Stephen F. Voorhees 1935–1937
- Charles Donagh Maginnis 1937–1939
- George Edwin Bergstrom 1939–1941
- Richmond Harold Shreve 1941–1943
- Raymond J. Ashton 1943–1945
- James Richard Edmunds Jr. 1945–1947
- Douglas William Orr 1947–1949
- Ralph Thomas Walker 1949–1951
- Glenn Stanton 1951–1953
- Clair W. Ditchy 1953–1955
- George Bain Cummings 1955–1956
- Leon Chatelain Jr. 1956–1958
- John N. Richards 1958–1960
- Philip Will Jr. 1960–1962
- Henry L. Wright 1962–1963
- J. Roy Carroll Jr. 1963–1964
- Arthur G. Odell Jr. 1964–1965
- Morris Ketchum Jr. 1965–1966
- Charles M. Nes Jr. 1966–1967
- Robert L. Durham 1967–1968
- George E. Kassabaum 1968–1969
- Rex Whitaker Allen 1969–1970
- Robert F. Hastings 1971
- Max O. Urbahn 1972
- S. Scott Ferebee Jr. 1973
- Archibald C. Rogers 1974
- William Marshall Jr. 1975
- Louis de Moll 1976
- John McGinty 1977
- Elmer E. Botsai 1978
- Ehrman B. Mitchell 1979
- Charles E. Schwing 1980
- Robert Randall Vosbeck 1981
- Robert M. Lawrence 1982
- Robert C. Broshar 1983
- George M. Notter 1984
- R. Bruce Patty 1985
- John A. Busby Jr. 1986
- Donald J. Hackl 1987
- Ted P. Pappas 1988
- Benjamin E. Brewer Jr. 1989
- Sylvester Damianos 1990
- Jim Lawler 1991
- W. Cecil Steward 1992
- Susan A. Maxman 1993
- L. William Chapin II 1994
- Chester A. Widom 1995
- Raymond Post Jr. 1996
- Raj Barr-Kumar 1997
- Ronald Arthur Altoon 1998
- Michael J. Stanton 1999
- Ronald L. Skaggs 2000
- John D. Anderson 2001
- Gordon H. Chong 2002
- Thompson E. Penney 2003
- Eugene C. Hopkins 2004
- Douglas L. Steidl 2005
- Katherine Lee Schwennsen 2006
- R. K. Stewart 2007
- Marshall Emmiett Purnell 2008
- Marvin J. Malecha 2009
- George H. Miller 2010
- Clark Manus 2011
- Jeff Potter 2012
- Mickey Jacob 2013
- Helene Combs Dreiling 2014
- Elizabeth Chu Richter 2015
- Russell A. Davidson 2016
- Thomas Vonier 2017
- Carl Elefante 2018
- William J. Bates 2019
- L. Jane Frederick 2020
- Peter J. Exley 2021
- Daniel S. Hart 2022
- Emily Grandstaff-Rice 2023
- Kimberly Dowdell 2024
- Evelyn M. Lee 2025
- Illya Azaroff 2026

== See also ==
- American Architectural Foundation (AAF)
- AIA Columbus, a chapter of the American Institute of Architects
- Architecture Billings Index
- Boston Society of Architects (BSA), a chapter of the American Institute of Architects
- Society of American Registered Architects
- Architecture of the United States
- Architecture of Washington, D.C.
