= Hoffman-Henon =

American architectural firm

Hoffman-Hennon was a prominent Philadelphia architectural firm known for its theater designs. W. H. Hoffman was the firm's senior partner. He partnered with Paul J. Henon Jr. to form Hoffman-Henon Co. The firm designed more than 100 theaters, 46 of them in Philadelphia. Many are still standing and several remain open.

One of the first movie palaces in Philadelphia was The Stanley Theater (1914) at 1620 Market Street, designed by W. H. Hoffman and later renamed the Stanton. During the silent era it featured a full orchestra. The theater was renamed The Milgram in 1968 and was demolished in 1980.

A second theater named the Stanley was also designed by Hoffman-Henon and opened at the southwest corner of 19th and Market in 1921. It had 2,916 and its own renowned orchestra. Al Capone was arrested at the theater in 1929. It was demolished in 1973 and the Philadelphia Stock Exchange was constructed on the site in 1982.

Working with the Ballinger Company, Hoffman-Henon designed the Commodore Theatre, located at 4228 Walnut Street in Philadelphia. This theatre, which had 1,105 seats and which was built in the Spanish Revival or Moorish architectural style, closed in the 1950s and became a live theatre and then a church in the 1960s, before gaining a new lease on life as a mosque in the 1980s. This building now houses the Masjid al-Jamia of Philadelphia.

The Mastbaum Memorial Theatre (1929) was a 4,700-seat theater built at 20th and Market. The opulent theater was demolished 29 years later

The firm is also credited with the 2,200-seat art deco Bolivar Theater (1933) in Quito, Ecuador.

The Bala Theatre at 157 Bala Avenue in Bala Cynwyd, Pennsylvania was open until 2014. Benedum Center for the Performing Arts (formerly the Stanley) remains open at 207 Seventh Street in Pittsburgh, Pennsylvania. Other Hoffman-Henon theaters still in operation include the Bristol Riverside Theatre at 120 Radcliffe Street in Bristol, Pennsylvania; the Bushfire Theatre (formerly the Locust Theatre) at 224 S. 52nd Street in Philadelphia; the Everett Theatre at 47 W. Main Street in Middletown, Delaware; the Philadelphia Film Center (1921) (formerly Prince Music Theater, the Karlton and Midtown) at 1412 Chestnut Street in Philadelphia and the Queen Theater at 500 North Market Street in Wilmington, Delaware. 19801

== Works ==
- The Karlton Theatre (1921), 1412 Chestnut Street, later known as the Midtown and then the Prince Music Theater
- Grand Opera House (1923, remodel)
- The Wynne Theater (1927–1928)
- Erlanger Theatre (1927)
- Stanley Theater, Philadelphia (1928)
- Stanley Theatre, Baltimore (1927–1965,1958 renamed The Stanton until its 1965 demolition)
- Boyd Theatre (1928)
- Stanley Theatre, Pittsburgh, later called the Benedum Center (1928)
- St. Joseph's House for Homeless Industrious Boys (1929)
- Mastbaum Theatre (1929)
- The Warner Theatre (1929)
- Earle Theatre
- Bolivar Theater (1933)

== See also ==
- William Steele & Sons, Architects
- Louis Magaziner
- Thomas W. Lamb
