= The Ballinger Company =

Ballinger
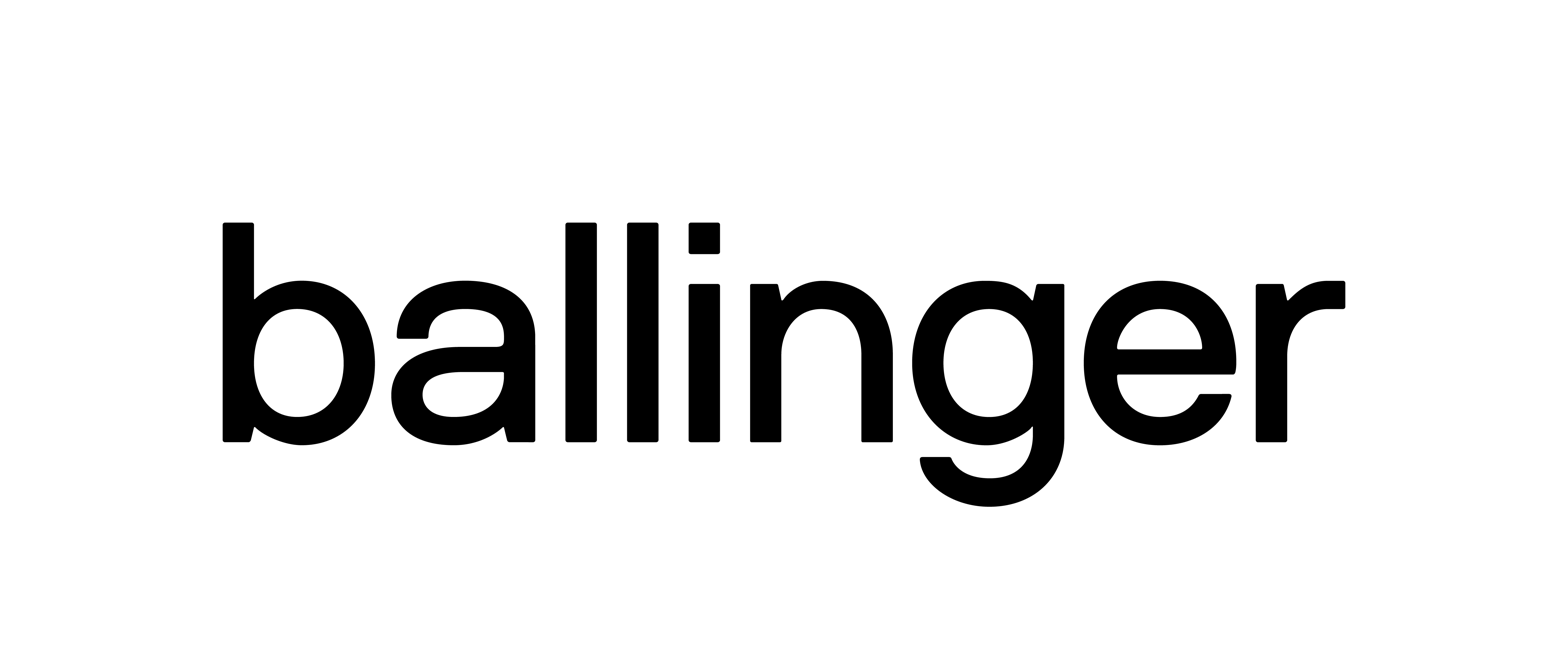
- Industry: Architecture
- Founded: Philadelphia, Pennsylvania, United States (1878)
- Founder: Walter Geissinger in 1878, renamed The Ballinger Company in 1920 by Walter Francis Ballinger
- Area served: International
- Services: Architecture, Engineering, Interior Design, Master Planning, Workplace Strategy, Adaptive Reuse
- Number of employees: 250+
- Website: www.ballinger.com

Ballinger is an interdisciplinary design firm, in the United States which merged the disciplines of architecture and engineering into a professional practice. The firm's single office in Philadelphia, Pennsylvania, houses a staff of over 250 people. Ballinger is one of the architectural firms in the Philadelphia region and known for its work in academic, healthcare, corporate, and research planning and design.

== History ==
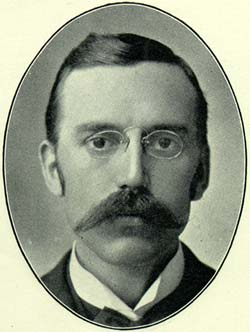
Walter Francis Ballinger

Ballinger traces its history to 1878 when Walter Harvey Geissinger established a practice in Philadelphia. In 1885, Geissinger entered into a partnership with Edward M. Hales. In 1889, Walter Francis Ballinger entered the firm of Geissinger and Hales and in 1895, when Ballinger replaced Geissinger as a principal in the firm, it became known as Hales and Ballinger. In 1901, Edward M. Hales retired, and in 1902, the firm was renamed Ballinger & Perrot.

Emile G. Perrot was a young architect at the time who gained national recognition for his innovative design work with reinforced concrete. After Ballinger bought out Perrot in 1920, the firm became known as Ballinger Company.

In the 1950s, Robert Ballinger succeeded his father, Walter Ballinger, and along with brothers John D. de Moll and Louis de Moll, introduced the “power pole” to deliver power, chilled water, and laboratory gases in research and health care environments.

In 1983, the deMoll brothers sold the firm to ten Ballinger employees. The transfer of ownership included promising young architects William R. Gustafson FAIA and Edward Jakmauh FAIA who would continue to lead the firm into the new millennium.

== Ballinger's early accomplishments and designs ==
=== 1900s ===
In the early 1900s, Ballinger was known for its commercial and industrial design firms in the United States, designing a number of landmark projects for the Victor Talking Machine Company (e.g. The Nipper Building), and subsequently RCA, as well as the first facility for the Joseph M. Campbell Company, later known as the Campbell Soup Company and now simply Campbell's. Additionally, Walter Ballinger and Emile Perrot published Inspector's Handbook of Reinforced Concrete in 1909.

=== 1920s ===
Walter F. Ballinger and Clifford H. Shivers filed a patent in 1921 for the Super Span saw-tooth roof truss which reduced the need for columns and opened up manufacturing plant floor space.

In 1923, Ballinger designed the Atwater Kent radio manufacturing plant in Philadelphia, while also designing their first hospital, the Philadelphia Home for Incurables/Inglis House, and the Benevolent and Protective Order of Elks, Lodge Number 878 in New York City.

In 1928, Ballinger built the Commodore Theatre, a grand cinema in West Philadelphia that held 1,105 seats. This building is now home of the Masjid Al-Jamia of Philadelphia.

=== 1930s ===
By the mid 1930s, Ballinger had completed 16 new hospitals.

=== 1940s ===
In the 1940s, Ballinger was at the epicenter of the Information Age with the design of one of the first "computer rooms." Utilizing over 17,000 vacuum tubes, the ENIAC was developed by the University of Pennsylvania's Moore School of Electrical Engineering during World War II.

ENIAC initiated the modern computing industry and the firm went on to design technology-related facilities for IBM and the Rand Corporation (later to become the Sperry Rand Corporation, and now known as Unisys).

=== 1950s ===
Ballinger designs the TWA Maintenance Hangar at Philadelphia International Airport – "an early and unusual example of the use of a cable supported roof structure to provide the clear floor space needed for an airplane hangar." (Constructed 1955–1956)

=== 1970s ===
Architects William Gustafson and Ed Jakmauh joined Ballinger and brought the firm a commission for Wills Eye Hospital in Center City, Philadelphia. The project involved a 230,000-square-foot hospital building and became part of Ballinger's healthcare design work.

=== 1980s ===
Under new leadership, Ballinger wins a national competition to design a new 200-acre world headquarters for Hershey Foods and teams with Pei Cobb Freed on the design of high rise complex Commerce Square. The Wills Eye building is completed in 1981 and becomes the first Ballinger project to be published in Architectural Record.

== Notable recent projects ==
Project	Location	Date of Completion	Notes	Ref.
University of Wisconsin, Chemistry Building	Madison, WI	2022		
Penn Medicine, Radnor Ambulatory Care Center	Radnor, PA	2020	AIA, Pennsylvania, Honor Award, 2021 AIA, Philadelphia, Honor Award, 2021 AIA/Academy of Architecture for Health, National Healthcare Design Award, 2021	
University of Michigan, Kinesiology Building	Ann Arbor, MI	2020	AIA, Pennsylvania, COTE Award of Excellence, 2022 AIA, Pennsylvania, Merit Award, Preservation, 2022 AIA, Pennsylvania, Merit Award, 2022	
University of Rhode Island, Fascitelli Center for Advanced Engineering	Kingston, RI	2019	AIA, Pennsylvania, Honor Award, Architecture, 2022 AIA, Rhode Island Chapter, Honor Award AIA, Tri-State Design Awards, Merit Award, 2021 Delaware Valley Association of Structural Engineers, Engineering Excellence Award American Institute of Steel Construction, IDEAS2 Awards, Finalist	
University of Maryland Baltimore County, Interdisciplinary Life Sciences Building	Catonsville, MD	2019	AIA, Philadelphia Chapter, Merit Award ASHRAE, Philadelphia Chapter, Technology Award ASHRAE, Mid-Atlantic, Technology Award International Interior Design Association, PA/NJ/DE Chapter, Best of Education/Institution AIA, Maryland Chapter, Institutional Architecture, Jury Citation Construction Owners Association of America, Project Leadership Award	
Linode, Corporate Headquarters	Philadelphia, PA	2018	Preservation Alliance for Greater Philadelphia, Grand Jury Award, 2019	
NewYork-Presbyterian Hospital, David H. Koch Center for Ambulatory Care	New York, NY	2018	Healthcare Design Magazine, Award of Merit, 2019 SALUS European Healthcare Design Award, Healthcare Design over 25,000 SM, 2019 SALUS European Healthcare Design Award, Design Innovation for Quality Improvement, 2019 Interior Design Magazine Best of Year Honoree, 2018 Greater New York Construction User Council Outstanding Healthcare Project, 2018 Engineering News-Record New York Health Care Best Project, 2018	
University of Maryland College Park, A. James Clark Hall	College Park, MD	2018	Washington Building Congress Craftsmanship Award, Concrete, 2017	
Children's Hospital of Philadelphia, Roberts Center for Pediatric Research	Philadelphia, PA	2017	ENR Award of Merit, Higher Education/Research, 2017; DVASE Outstanding Project Award, Buildings over $100M, 2017	
Adelphi University, Nexus Building	Garden City, NY	2016	AIA Silver Award, Unbuilt, Philadelphia Chapter, 2014; AIA Merit Award, Unbuilt, Pennsylvania Chapter, 2013	
Tower Health, HealthPlex for Advanced Surgical and Patient Care	Reading, PA	2016	International Academy for Design and Health, Highly Commended, Sustainable Urban and Built Environment, 2017	
University of Rochester Medical Center, Golisano Children's Hospital	Rochester, NY	2015	HCD Expo & Conference, 2013 – An EBD Report Card for Pediatrics	
George Washington University, Science & Engineering Hall	Washington, D.C.	2014	SCUP Honor Award for Excellence in Architecture for a New Building, 2017; IIDA Best of Year Award, PA, NJ, and DE Chapter, 2015; Concrete Foundation Association, Grand Project of the Year, 2015; Delaware Valley Association of Structural Engineers, Merit Award, 2015; AIA Pennsylvania Merit Award, Interiors, 2016; AIA Philadelphia Merit Award, Interiors, 2016; ENR MidAtlantic, Award of Merit, Specialty Contracting, 2014; American Concrete Institute, National Capital Chapter, Award of Merit, 2014; ABC Metro Washington, Excellence in Construction Award, Specialty Concrete	
Rutgers University, New Jersey Institute for Food, Nutrition, and Health	New Brunswick, NJ	2014	AIA Merit Award, New Jersey chapter 2014	
University of Florida, Harrell Medical Education Building	Gainesville, FL	2014	AIA Orlando Design Award, Built Award Honor, 2016; City of Gainesville, City Beautification “Outstanding Institution” Award, 2016	
Penn Medicine Chester County Hospital, Lasko Tower	Chester County, PA	2014	PDC Summit 2016 – Studying the Past to Build a Better Future	
The Wistar Institute, Facility Master Plan + Robert and Penny Fox Tower	Philadelphia, PA	2014	Delaware Valley Association of Structural Engineers, Outstanding Project Award, 2015	
NYU Langone Medical Center, Ambulatory Care Center West Side	New York, NY	2014	Adaptive Reuse Award, Symposium Distinction Awards, 2015	
Johns Hopkins University, Undergraduate Teaching Laboratories	Baltimore, MD	2013	ASHRAE Technology Award, First Place, 2017; AIA Honor Award, Philadelphia Chapter, 2014; AIA Merit Award, Maryland Chapter, 2014; AIA Merit Award, Pennsylvania Chapter, 2015; SCUP, Excellence in Architecture, Honor Award, 2016; USGBC, Maryland Chapter, Wintergreen Award, 2016	
Penn Medicine, Lancaster General Health, Ann B. Barshinger Cancer Institute	Lancaster, PA	2013	International Academy for Design and Health, Winner, Interior Design, 2017; International Academy for Design and Health, Highly Commended, Use of Art in Public and Private Spaces, 2017; AIA/AAH Healthcare Design Award, 2014; Healthcare Design Architectural Showcase, Honorable Mention, 2014; IIDA Design Excellence Award, Philadelphia Chapter, 2014; Best of the Year Honoree, Interior Design Magazine, 2013	
University of Maryland Medical Center, Shock Trauma Critical Care Tower	Baltimore, MD	2013	American Concrete Institute, Maryland Chapter, Excellence in Concrete Award, 2013	
Shore Medical Center, Surgical Pavilion	Somers Point, NJ	2012	IIDA, Design Award, Philadelphia Chapter, 2012	
The Boeing Company, H-47 Focused Factory	Ridley Park, PA	2012	ENR MidAtlantic, Best Project: Manufacturing, 2014; ENR Best of the Best Project: Manufacturing, 2014	
University of Wisconsin–Madison, Wisconsin Institutes for Discovery	Madison, WI	2011	Lab of the Year, R&D Magazine, 2012; USGBC Innovation in Green Building Award, 2012; AIA Merit Award, Wisconsin Chapter, 2011; Focus on Energy Award of Excellence, Wisconsin Green Building Alliance, 2011; Future Landmark Award, Madison Trust for Historic Preservation, 2011	
Children's Hospital of Philadelphia, Colket Translational Research Building	Philadelphia, PA	2010	Best Green Building Award, General Building Contractors Association, 2011	
Temple University School of Medicine, Medical Education + Research Building	Philadelphia, PA	2009	School of Medicine's first new building in 40 years	
Johns Hopkins University, School of Medicine, Anne and Mike Armstrong Medical Education Building	Baltimore, MD	2007	School of Medicine's first new building in 25 years	
Weill Cornell Medicine, Weill Greenberg Center	New York, NY	2007	Modern Healthcare Award of Excellence, 2008; AIA/AAH National Design Award for Healthcare, 2008; IIDA Design Award, Philadelphia Chapter, 2007; Interior Design Magazine’s 2007 Best of Year Award: Project Design, Healthcare	
Brown University, Sidney Frank Hall (Life Sciences Building)	Providence, RI	2006	AIA Merit Award, Rhode Island Chapter, 2008; AIA Special Recognition Award, Philadelphia Chapter, 2002	

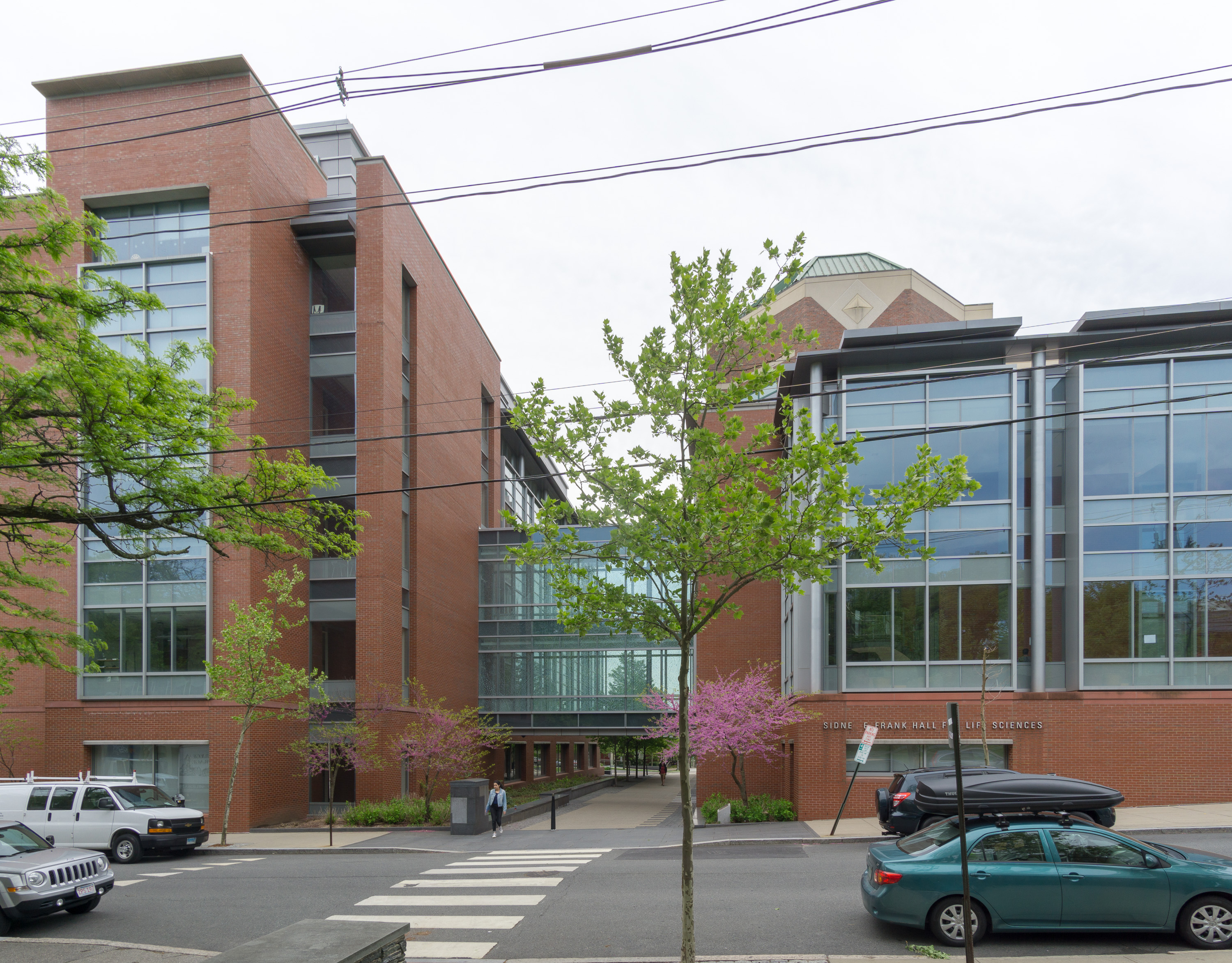
Sidney Frank Hall at Brown University (2006)

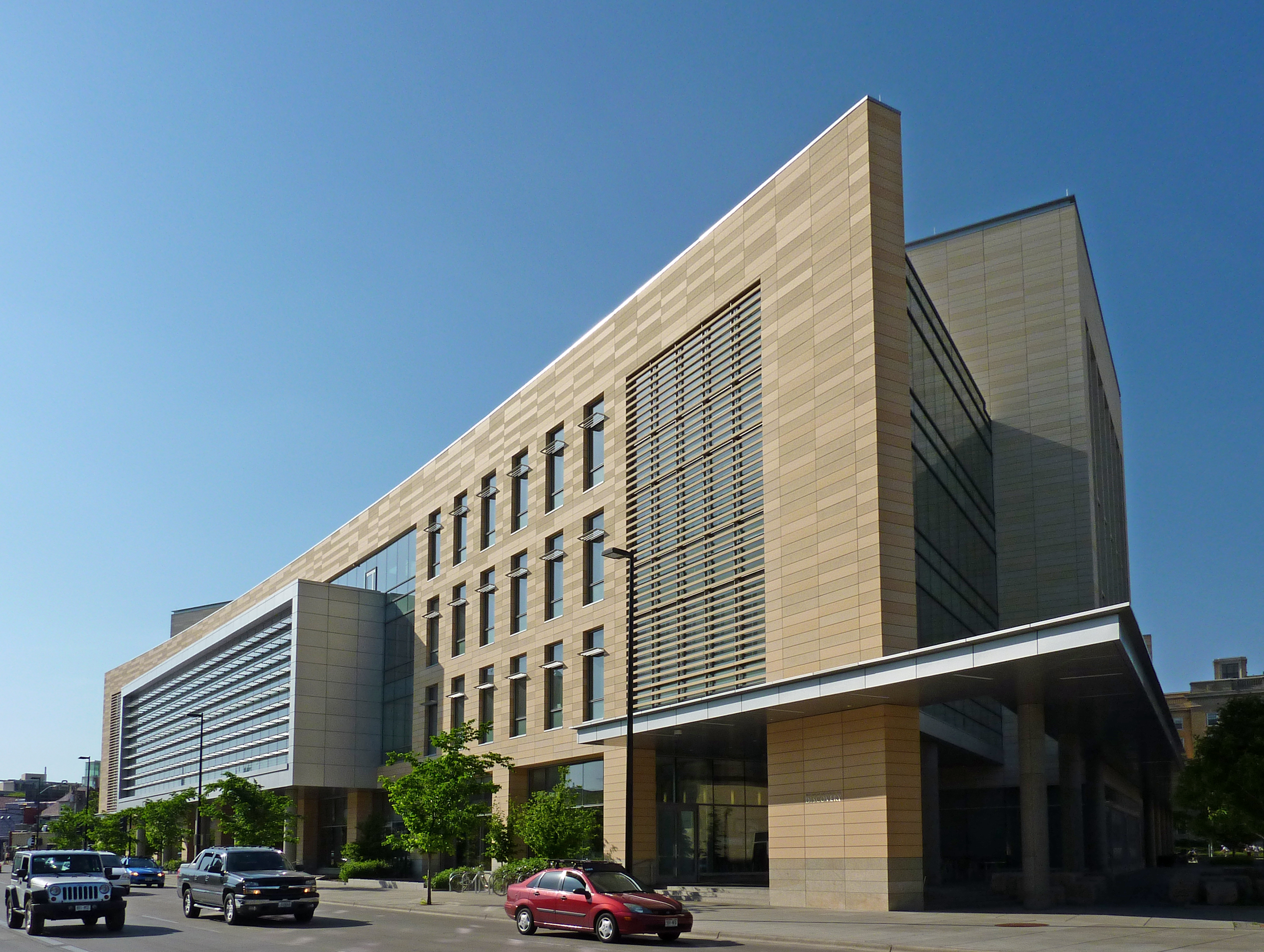
University of Wisconsin–Madison, Wisconsin Institutes for Discovery

== Notable recent awards ==
- AIA Pennsylvania, COTE Award of Excellence, 2022 – University of Michigan – Kinesiology Building
- AIA Pennsylvania, Firm of the Year Award, 2020
- Healthcare Design Magazine, Award of Merit, 2019 – NewYork-Presbyterian Hospital – David H. Koch Center for Ambulatory Care
- AIA Pennsylvania, Honor Award, 2018 – University of Maryland, College Park – A. James Clark Hall
- ENR MidAtlantic, Award of Merit, Higher Education/Research, 2017 – Children's Hospital of Philadelphia – Roberts Center for Pediatric Research
- SCUP/AIA/CAE Honor Award for Excellence in Architecture for a New Building – George Washington University – Science and Engineering Hall
- ASHRAE Technology Award, 1st Place, New Educational Facility, 2017 – Johns Hopkins University – Undergraduate Teaching Laboratories
- AIA Award of Honor, Built, New Jersey Chapter, 2016 – Rutgers University – New Jersey Institute for Food Nutrition & Health
- SCUP/AIA/CAE Honor Award for Excellence in Architecture-Building Additions, Renovation, or Adaptive Reuse, 2016 – Johns Hopkins University – Undergraduate Teaching Laboratories
- AIA Award of Honor, Orlando Chapter, 2016 – University of Florida – Harrell Medical Education Building
- IIDA "Best of Year" Award for Interior Design, 2015 – George Washington University – Science & Engineering Hall
- AIA Silver Award, Unbuilt, Philadelphia Chapter, 2014 – Adelphi University – Nexus Academic Building/Welcome Center
- AIA/AAH Healthcare Design Award, 2014 – Penn Medicine – Lancaster General Health, Ann B. Barshinger Cancer Institute
- Lab of the Year, R&D Magazine, 2012 – University of Wisconsin-Madison – Wisconsin Institutes for Discovery
- Excellence in Craftsmanship Award, General Building Contractors Association, 2011 – The Boeing Company – Integrated Defense Building 3-61
- Merit Award, American Institutes of Architects, 2008 – Brown University – Life Sciences Building
- Modern Healthcare Award of Excellence, 2008 – Weill Cornell Medical College – Weill Greenberg Center
