= Float4 =

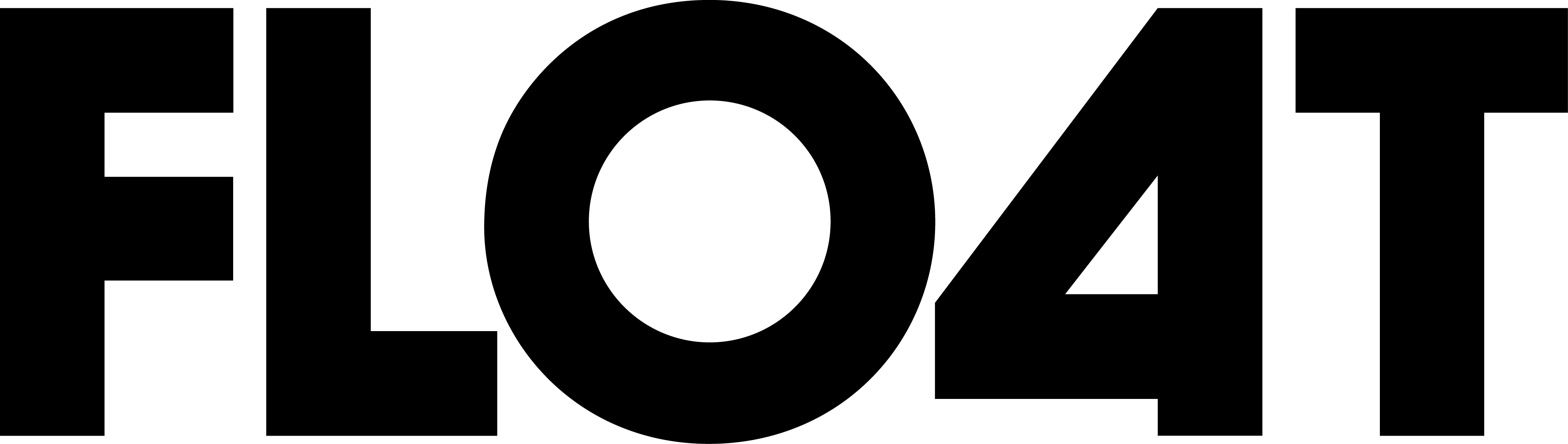
- Company type: Private
- Industry: New Media - Design/Architecture
- Founded: 2008
- Founder: Alexandre Simionescu
- Headquarters: Montreal, Qc, Canada
- Area served: Worldwide
- Website: www.float4.com

Float4 is a Montreal-based multidisciplinary studio that integrates digital experiences in physical spaces to amplify their identity. Founded in 2008, Float4 produces immersive and interactive installations internationally for companies. Float4 launched its proprietary platform, RealMotion, during Infocomm 2017 in Orlando.

== Team ==
Co-founded in 2008 by Alexandre Simionescu and Sevan Dalkian, Float4's team is diversified: multimedia designers, creative directors, producers, developers, technicians and integrators. In 2018, Float4 welcomed Alexandre Simionescu as the studio's Principal.

== Projects and collaborations ==
- 2018 - Statue of Liberty Museum in collaboration with ESI Design, Ellis Island, USA
- 2018 - 900 North Michigan Shops in collaboration with ESI Design, Chicago, USA
- 2017 - Vancouver International Airport, Vancouver, CA
- 2017 - Place du Canada, Montreal, CA
- 2017 - Casino Seneca Buffalo Creek, Buffalo, USA
- 2017 - Sofitel Paris Baltimore, Paris, France
- 2016 - Meraas City Walk, Dubaï, UAE
- 2016 - eBay Main Street in collaboration with ESI Design, San Jose, California
- 2016 - Royal Caribbean in collaboration with Material & Methods, Ovation of the Sea Cruise Ship
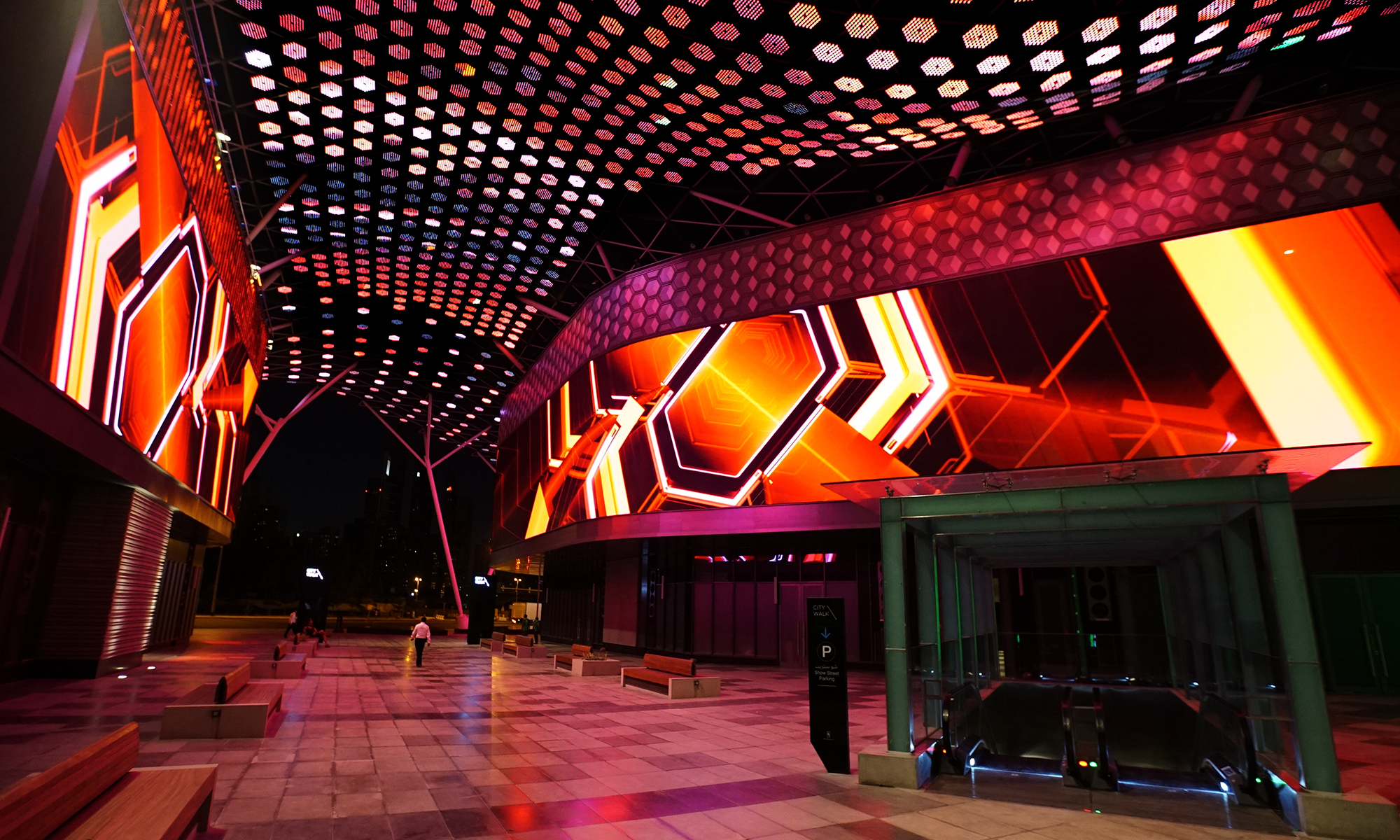
  Float4 digital installation in City Walk Dubaï Mall
- 2015 - Liberty Lights, Cincinnati Ohio
- 2014 - Desjardins Corporate Headquarters, Montreal QC
- 2014 - Ministère de la culture, Quebec Government
- 2014 - NBA All-Star jam session, New Orleans Louisiana
- 2014 - SECU Interactive Art Wall, Raleigh NC
- 2014 - Mere Hotel Welcome Wall, Winnipeg
- 2014 - Morguard Performance Court, Ottawa ON
- 2013 - Capco Headquarters, New York City
- 2013 - ADC's 92nd Annual Awards, Miami beach
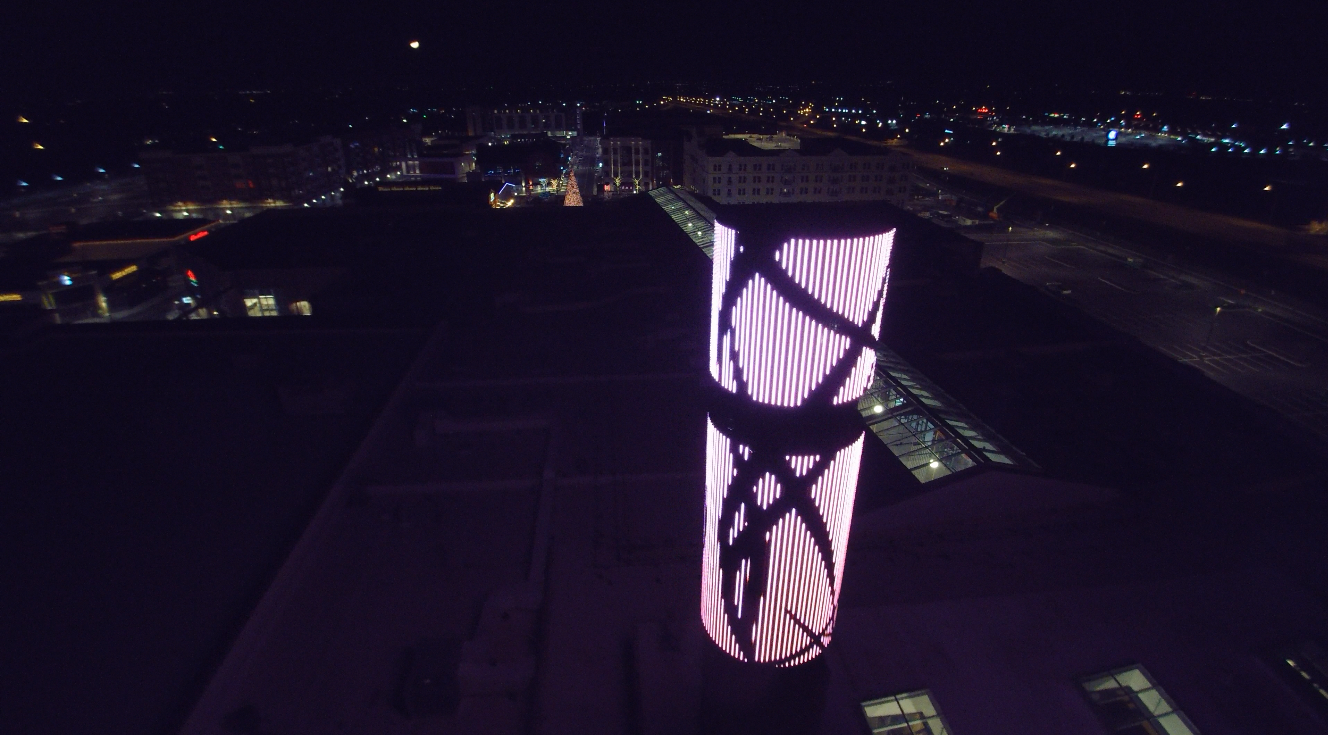
  Liberty Lights, 2015, Cincinnati, Ohio
- 2013 - SXSW, Austin TX
- 2012 - Palais des congrès Interactive Wall, Montreal QC
- 2012 - Digi-key Interactive floor, Munich
- 2012 - Marine Magnet Science Highschool, Groton USA
- 2012 - Saudi Aramco Headquarters, Houston
- 2012 - Canada House at the London Olympics, London
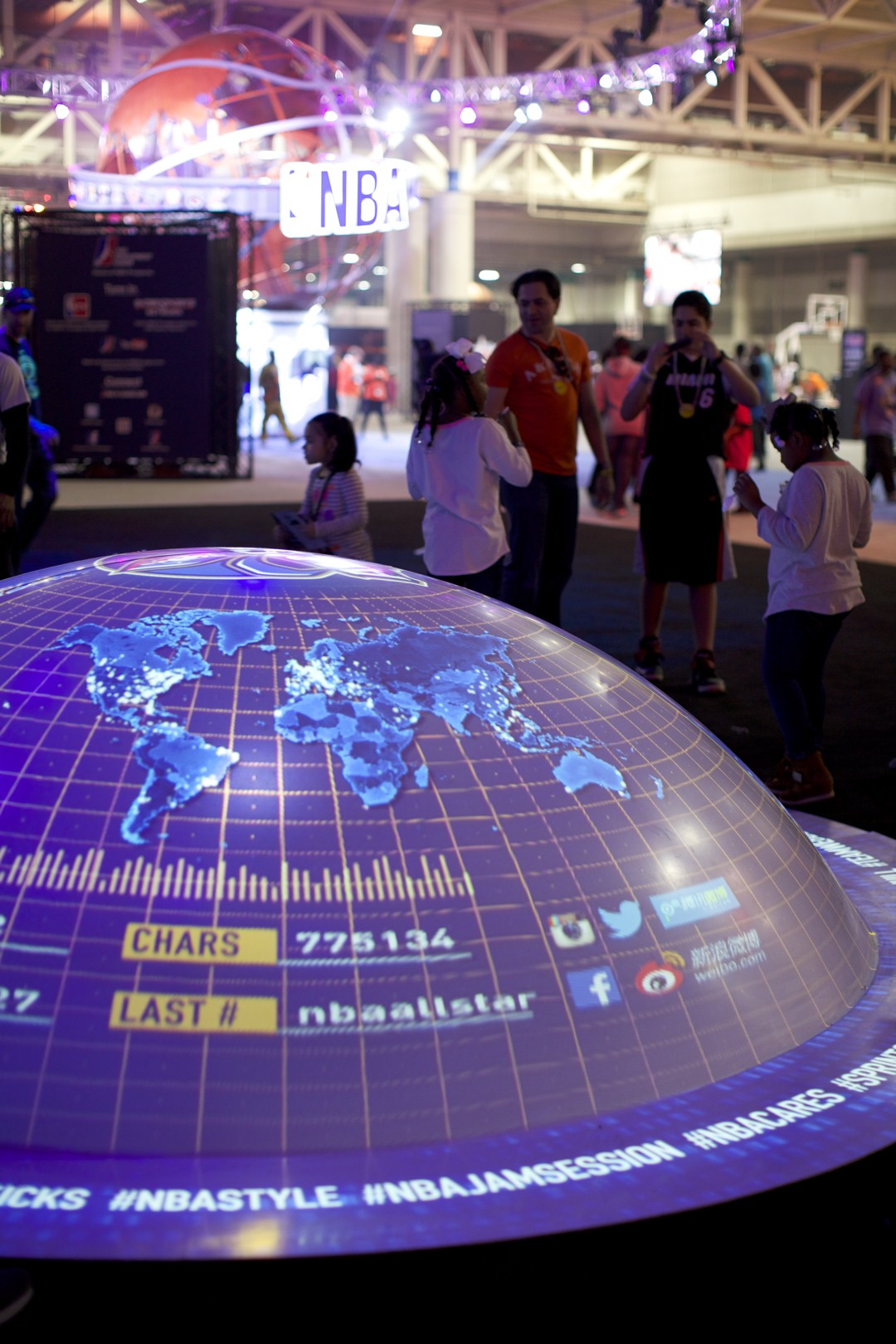
  Jam Session NBA, 2014, New Orleans
- 2012 - FishNet Security Interactive Wall, Kansas City
- 2012 - Antron Showroom @Neocon, Chicago
- 2012 - One Drop's "Aqua" Exhibit
- 2012 - Davos World Economic Forum, Switzerland
- 2011 - Hotel Gansevoort Projection Mapping, New York City
- 2011 - Saint Luke's Hospital of Kansas City Media Wall, Kansas City
- 2011 - J.P Morgan Headquarters, New York City
- 2011 - APEC Summit, Honolulu
- 2011 - Novartis Interactive Wall, Stockholm
- 2011 - Garnier Luminato, Toronto ON
- 2011 - Tryst Night Club Projection Mapping, Las Vegas
- 2011 - Flash:Light NY, New York City
- 2011 - Wisconsin Institutes for Discovery, Madison Wisconsin
- 2010 - Kyocera Campaign, Chicago
- 2010 - Miami Dolphins Interactive Wall, Miami
- 2010 - Verizon Executive Business Center, New Jersey

== Awards and distinctions ==
- 2018 - HOW International Design Awards - Best of Show - City Walk Dubai
- 2018 - World Retail Awards Finalist - City Walk Dubai
- 2017 - DSE Apex Award Finalist - City Walk Dubai
- 2017 - Architizer A+Awards Finalist - Shopping Centre - City Walk Dubai
- 2017 - AV Awards Finalist - CityWalk Dubai
- 2017 - NUMIX Finalist - Immersive Production - City Walk Dubai
- 2017 - NUMIX Finalist - Branding - Sofitel Hotel
- 2017 - HOW International Design Awards - Merit Award - Sofitel Hotel
- 2017 - Horizon Interactive Award - Best in Category & Gold Winner - City Walk Dubai
- 2017 - AV Awards - Best Corporate Project of the Year Winner - eBay Main Street
- 2016 - Spark Experience Award Finalist - eBay MainStreet
- 2015 - Banque Nationale SME Award for Businesses under $5M - FLOAT4
- 2015 - Horizon Interactive Awards - Gold Winner - Liberty Lights
- 2015 - Horizon Interactive Award - Gold Winner - Royal Caribbean
- 2015 - Horizon Interactive Award - Gold Winner - NBA Digital Jam Session
- 2013 - DSE Apex Awards - Gold for Corporate Digital Media Content - SECU
- 2013 - DSA Industry Excellence Award - Aramco Experience
- 2012 - DSE Gold Apex Award - Best Event Venue - Antron Showroom
- 2011 - IIDA Design Excellence Award - Best Non-Profit Agency Deployment Self-Service Kiosk - Wisconsin Institute for Discovery
- 2011 - DSA Industry Excellence Award - Best Non-Profit Agency Deployment Self-Service Kiosk - St.Luke's Hospital
