= International Union of Architects =

Non-governmental organization

The International Union of Architects (French: Union Internationale des Architectes; UIA) is an international, democratic, non-governmental association that brings together national federations of architects. It was founded on 28 June 1948 in Lausanne, Switzerland. In 2010, it represented 124 countries and more than 1,300,000 architects. The current president is Regina Gonthier of Switzerland, elected for the 2023–2026 term.

== Overview ==
The UIA was founded on 28 June 1948 in Lausanne, Switzerland, following the merger of the Comité permanent international des Architectes and the Réunion International des Architectes. Its General Secretariat is located in Paris. The organisation is recognised as the only global architecture organisation by most United Nations agencies, including UNESCO, UNCHS, ECOSOC, UNIDO and the World Health Organization as well as the WTO. The current (2023–2026) president is Regina Gonthier from Switzerland.

Through its Member Sections, the UIA is represented in over 100 countries and territories, geographically grouped into five regions:

- Region I: Western Europe
- Region II: Eastern Europe
- Region III: The Americas
- Region IV: Asia and Oceania
- Region V: Africa

== Governing bodies ==
The governing bodies of the UIA are:

- The Assembly: the supreme body of the UIA composed of delegates from UIA Member Sections in addition to Council members.
- Council: between meetings of the Assembly, the Council is responsible for managing and directing the affairs of the Union. It is composed of 4 elected members from each of the UIA's five regions in addition to the Bureau members.
- Bureau: composed of the President, the Immediate Past President, the Secretary General, the Treasurer, and a Vice-President from each Region

=== Presidents ===
The UIA has been presided over by:

- Sir Patrick Abercrombie, United Kingdom (1948–1953)
- Jean Tschumi, Switzerland (1953–1957)
- Hector Mardones Restat, Chile (1957–1961)
- Sir Robert Matthews, United Kingdom (1961–1965)
- Eugene Beaudouin, France (1965–1969)
- Ramon Corona Martin, Mexico (1969–1972)
- Georgui Orlov, USSR (1972–1975)
- Jai Rattan Bhalla, India (1975–1978)
- Louis de Moll, USA (1978–1981)
- Rafael De La Hoz, Spain (1981–1985)
- Georgi Stoilov, Bulgaria (1985–1987)
- Rod Hackney, United Kingdom (1987–1990)
- Olufemi Majekodunmi, Nigeria (1990–1993)
- Jaime Duro, Spain (1993–1996)
- Sara Topelson, Mexico (1996–1999)
- Vassilis Sgoutas, Greece (1999–2002)
- Jaime Lerner, Brazil (2002–2005)
- Gaetan Siew, Mauritius (2005–2008)
- Louise Cox, Australia (2008–2011)
- Albert Dubler, France (2011–2014)
- Esa Mohamed, Malaysia (2014–2017)
- Thomas Vonier, USA (2017–2021)
- José Luis Cortés, Mexico (2021–2023)
- Regina Gonthier, Switzerland (2023–2026)

== Congresses ==
The UIA World Congresses are key events for professional and cultural exchange among all the world's architects, bringing together thousands of participants from around the globe. Each event focuses on a different architecture-related theme, developed by eminent personalities from the international architectural, planning and construction fields. Debates, exhibitions, tours and networking events make the UIA Congresses the perfect meeting place for experts, colleagues, friends, and students of architecture.

UIA Congresses are organised by a host UIA Member Section. Congress bids are submitted to the UIA General Assembly and selected by vote six years in advance of the event.

USSR stamp and souvenir sheet of 1958 dedicated to the 5th World Congress of Architecture
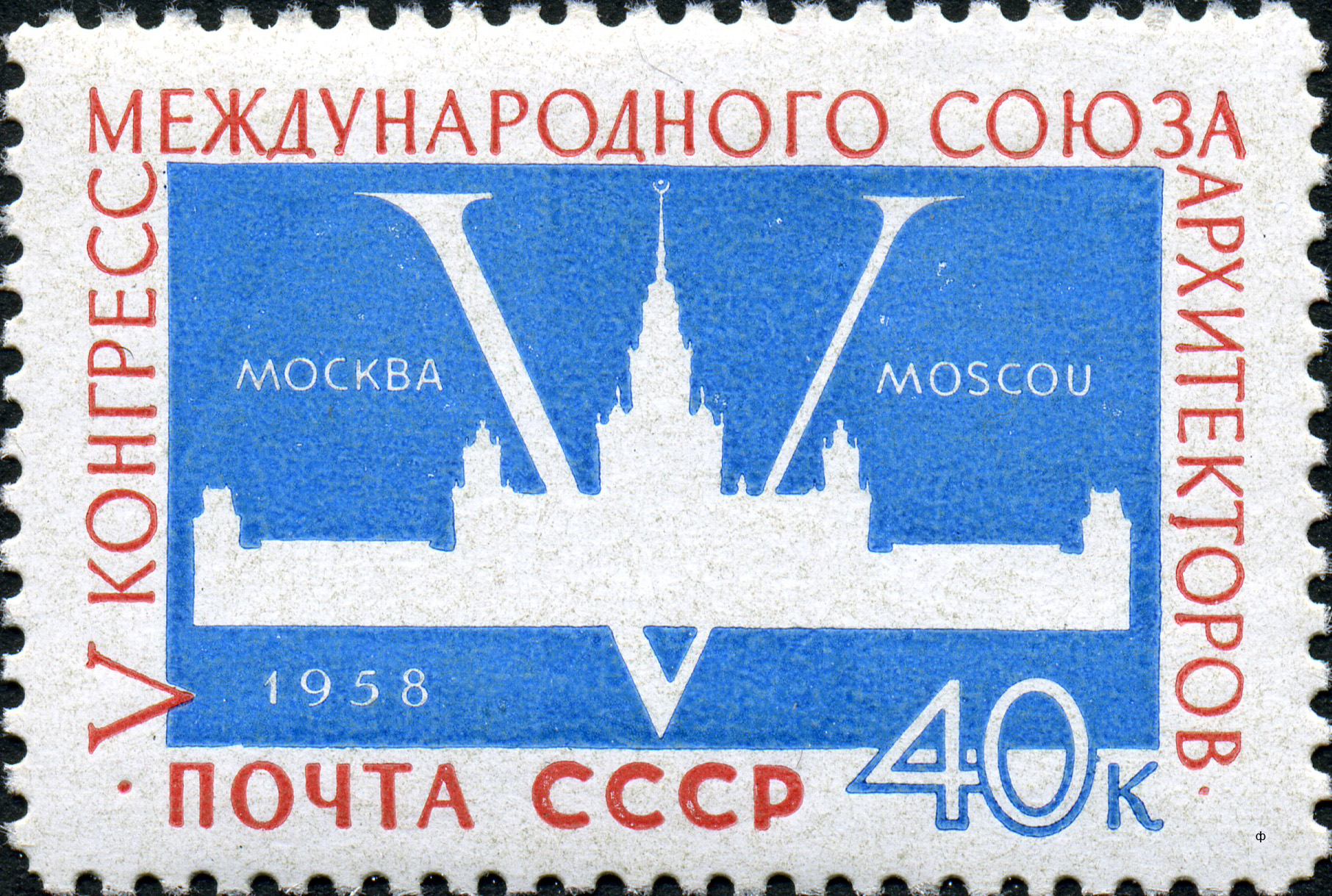
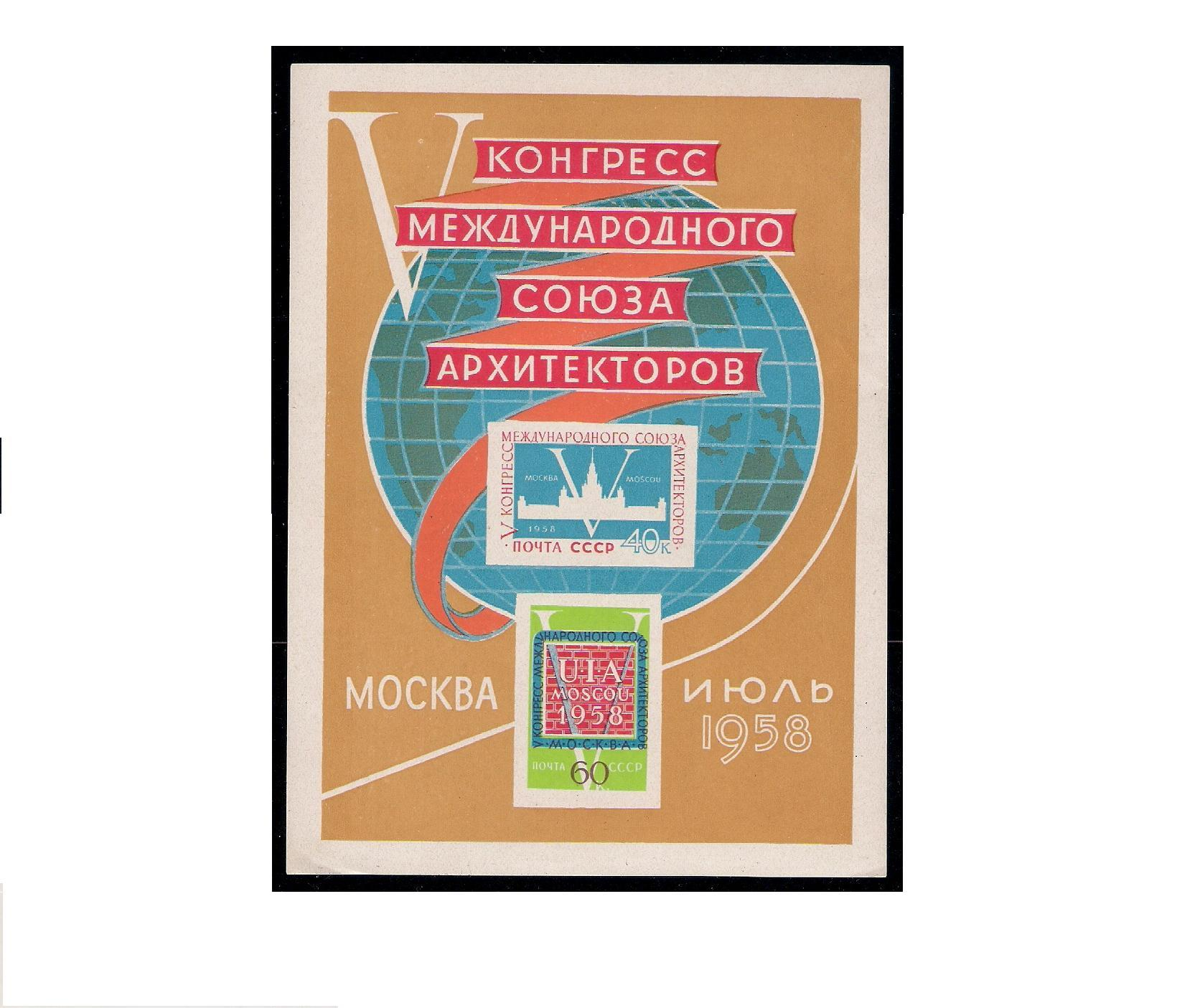

Nr.	Year	Location	Theme
1st	1948	(Switzerland) Lausanne	Architecture Faced with its New Tasks
2nd	1951	(Morocco) Rabat	How Architecture is Dealing with its New Tasks
3rd	1953	(Portugal) Lisbon	Architecture at the Crossroads
4th	1955	(Netherlands) The Hague	Architecture and the Evolutions of Building
5th	1958	(Soviet Union) Moscow	Construction and Reconstruction
6th	1961	(United Kingdom) London	New Techniques and New Materials
7th	1963	(Cuba) Havana	Architecture in Underdeveloped Countries
8th	1965	(France) Paris	The Training of Architects
9th	1967	(Czechoslovakia) Prague	Architecture and the Human Milieu
10th	1969	(Argentina) Buenos Aires	Architecture as a Social Factor
11th	1972	(Bulgaria) Varna	Architecture and Leisure
12th	1975	(Spain) Madrid	Creativity and Technology
13th	1978	Mexico City	Architecture and National Development
14th	1981	(Poland) Warsaw	Architecture, Man, Environment
15th	1985	(Egypt) Cairo	Present and Future Missions of the Architect
16th	1987	(United Kingdom) Brighton	Shelter and Cities - Building Tomorrow's World
17th	1990	(Canada) Montreal	Cultures and Technologies
18th	1993	(United States) Chicago	Architecture at the Crossroads - Designing for a Sustainable Future
19th	1996	(Spain) Barcelona	Present and Futures. Architecture in Cities
20th	1999	(China) Beijing	Architecture of the 21st Century
21st	2002	(Germany) Berlin	Resource Architecture
22nd	2005	(Turkey) Istanbul	Grand Bazaar of Architectures
23rd	2008	(Italy) Turin	Transmitting Architecture
24th	2011	(Japan) Tokyo	DESIGN 2050 Beyond disasters, through Solidarity, towards Sustainability
25th	2014	(South Africa) Durban	Architecture otherwhere
26th	2017	(South Korea) Seoul	Soul of City
27th	2020	(Brazil) Rio de Janeiro	All Worlds. One World. Architecture in the 21st Century.
28th	2023	(Denmark) Copenhagen	Design for a Sustainable Future
29th	2026	(Spain) Barcelona	One day, One tomorrow

== World Capital of Architecture ==
On 23 November 2018, the UIA published a Memorandum of Understanding with UNESCO on the new joint label World Capital of Architecture. The title is awarded every three years, according to the rhythm of the UIA World Congresses. Since 2020, the world congress has always taken place in the respective world capital. There is a formal application process for this. The World Congress selects the World Capital for the year of the next World Congress from the shortlist of applications, the formal announcement being made by the Secretary General of UNESCO. In 2020 Rio de Janeiro was the world capital of architecture, 2023 Copenhagen and 2026 Barcelona. A program and a series of major events take place in the respective world capital throughout the calendar year.

== UIA Gold Medal ==
Since 1984, the organisation has also awarded the UIA Gold Medal to honour an architect (or group of architects) having distinguished themselves through their work and professional practice by the quality of services rendered to man and society. Past recipients of the award include:

Year	Architect	Country
1984	Hassan Fathy	Egypt
1987	Reima Pietilä	Finland
1990	Charles Correa	India
1993	Fumihiko Maki	Japan
1996	Rafael Moneo	Spain
1999	Ricardo Legorreta Vilchis	Mexico
2002	Renzo Piano	Italy
2005	Tadao Ando	Japan
2008	Teodoro González de León	Mexico
2011	Álvaro Siza Vieira	Portugal
2014	I. M. Pei	United States
2017	Toyo Ito	Japan
2021	Paulo Mendes da Rocha	Brazil
2026	Eduardo Souto de Moura	Portugal

== UIA Triennial Prizes ==
The UIA also awards the following five prizes:

- The Patrick Abercrombie Prize for Urban Planning and Design
- The Auguste Perret Prize for Technology in Architecture
- The Jean Tschumi Prize for Architectural Writing & Critique
- The Robert Matthew Prize for Sustainable & Humane Environments
- The Vassilis Sgoutas Prize for Implemented Architecture Serving the Impoverished

=== UIA Award for Innovation in Architectural Education ===
The UIA Award for Innovation in Architectural Education is organised by the UIA Architectural Education Commission. Established in 2019, it recognises architecture programmes or schools for their innovative pedagogical approaches.

Edition	Laureates
2019–2021	The Royal Danish Academy, School of Architecture, Copenhagen, Denmark — Architectural Education Through On-Site Collaboration – Architecture and Extreme Environments — David A. Garcia; University of Washington – Seattle, College of Built Environments, Department of Architecture, United States — Seminar: Traditional Building Methods: New Adaptations — Elizabeth M. Golden; School of Architecture, Southeast University, Nanjing, China — Living Construction in Rural Communities — Zhang Tong, the staff and students at the School of Architecture; School of Architecture, Tsinghua University, China — Sustainable Design Studio — Song Yehao
2021–2023	Department of Architecture and Civil Engineering, Chalmers University of Technology, Gothenburg, Sweden — Design Activism Beyond Sustainability – Architectural Education based on Collaborative and Radical Pedagogy — Emilio Brandao, Shea Hagy Marco Adelfio and Liane Thuvander; Department of Architecture, Gazi University, Ankara, Turkey — Active Collaboration in Architectural Design Studio: Enhancing Knowledge Networks for Excellence in Pedagogical Practice — Semra Arslan Selçuk, Esra Özkan Yazgan and Aysenur Coskun; Beijing University of Civil Engineering and Architecture, Beijing, China — Building with Earth: A Mutual-educational Approach towards Sustainable Rural Revitalization Empowered by Traditional Wisdom — Mu Jun, Hao Shimeng, Jiang Wei, Zhou Tiegang, Jin Yibing and Ren Zhongqi; Architectural Engineering & Technology Programme, Faculty of Engineering, Cairo University, Cairo, Egypt — Sustainable Community Design and Social Development: Activating Spaces within Green and Healthy Corridors — Heba Allah Essam E. Khalil
2025–2026	Technological University Dublin, Ireland — Building Change — Bachelor of Architecture (Hons) Curriculum Reform; Faculty of Architecture, University of Lima, Peru — Inclusive by Design: International Online Workshop on Universal Design and Inclusive Architectural Education; Common Basic Cycle, FADU, University of Buenos Aires (UBA), Argentina — (inter)acciones urbanas [Urban (Inter)Actions] – Cátedra Najmias, Taller de Proyectos – Introduction to Design Knowledge II; South China University of Technology (SCUT), China — Proof of Design-Led Subtropical Sustainability: Dialogue, Build, Innovate; University of Pretoria, South Africa — From Awareness to Co-Implementation: A Staged Pedagogy for Climate Justice, Spatial Justice, and Circular Material Practice

== International design competitions ==
The UIA manages international architecture competitions.

- Georges Pompidou Centre, Paris
- Indira Gandhi Centre, New Delhi
- Bibliothèque Nationale de France, Paris
- National Museum of Seoul
- Prado National Museum, Madrid (rehabilitation and extension)
- Opera House, Sydney
