= St. Joseph's House for Homeless Industrious Boys =

- U.S. National Register of Historic Places
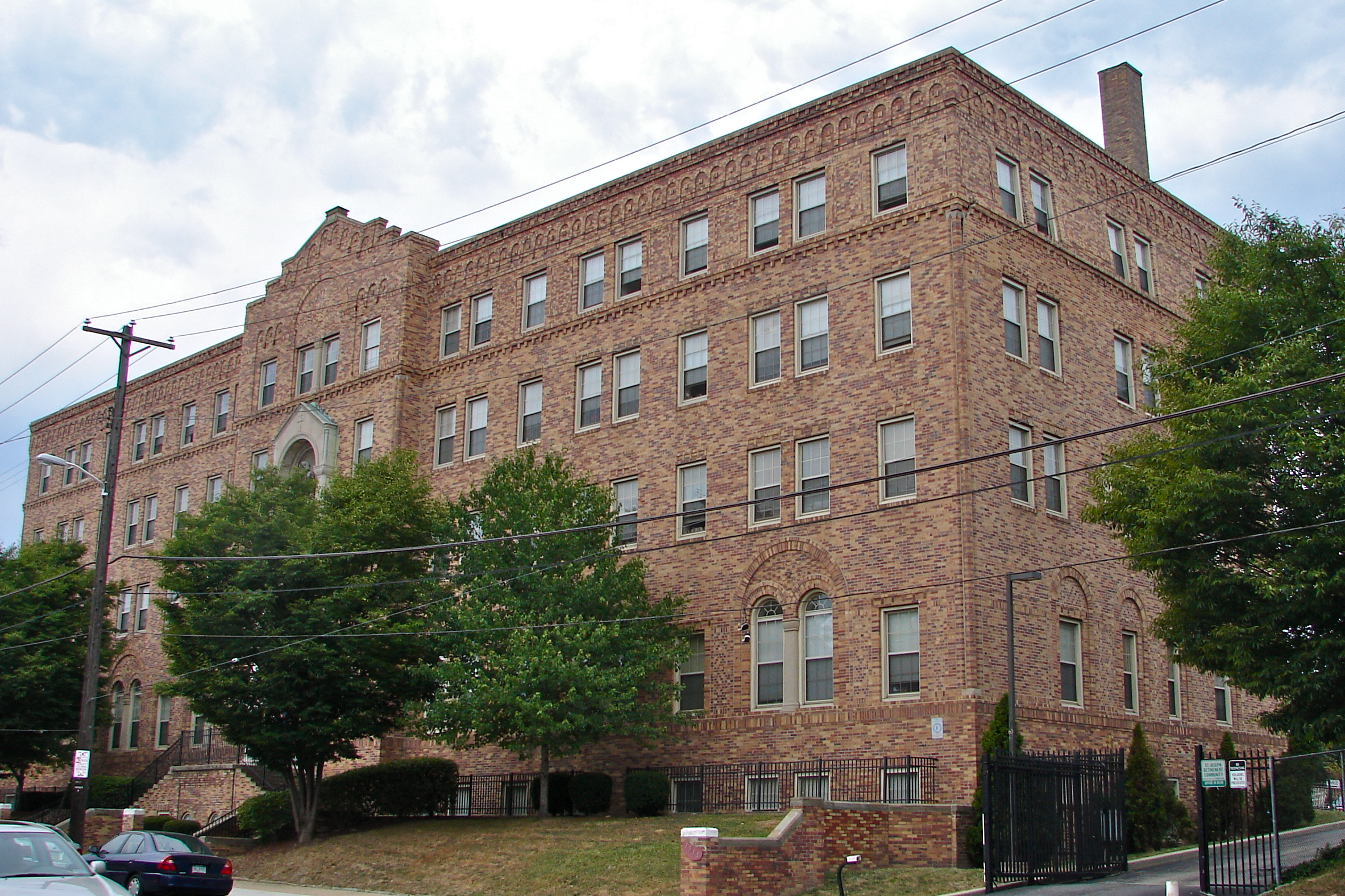
- St. Joseph's House for Homeless Industrious Boys, September, 2010

- Location within Philadelphia Location within Pennsylvania Location within the United States
- Location: 1511 and 1515--1527 Allegheny Rd., Philadelphia, Pennsylvania
- Coordinates: 40°0′6″N 75°9′22″W
- Area: 1.3 acres (0.53 ha)
- Built: 1929
- Architect: Hoffman-Henon; Getz, Peter, et al.
- Architectural style: Romanesque, Italianate, Tudor Revival
- NRHP reference No.: 96001204
- Added to NRHP: October 24, 1996

St. Joseph's House for Homeless Industrious Boys is a historic charity building at 1511 and 1515-1527 West Allegheny Avenue in the Nicetown-Tioga neighborhood of Philadelphia, Pennsylvania. It was designed by the Philadelphia architectural firm of Hoffman-Henon and built in 1929.

It was added to the National Register of Historic Places in 1996.
