= Boyd Theatre =

Former theatre in Philadelphia, PA, US

- Interactive map of Boyd Theatre
- Address: 1908 Chestnut St
- Location: Center City Philadelphia, Pennsylvania, U.S.
- Coordinates: 39.9517°N 75.1724°W
- Capacity: 2,450
- Type: Movie theater

Construction
- Opened: 1928
- Closed: 2002

Philadelphia Register of Historic Places

The Boyd Theatre was a 1920s era movie palace in Center City Philadelphia, Pennsylvania. It operated as a movie theater for 74 years, operating under the name Sameric as part of the United Artists theater chain, before closing in 2002. The theater was the last of its kind in downtown Philadelphia, a remnant of an era of theaters and movie palaces that stretched along Market and Chestnut Streets. The Boyd's auditorium was demolished in 2015 by its owner Pearl Properties, which planned to replace it with a 24-story residential tower.

== History ==
The Boyd was designed by Philadelphia architecture firm Hoffman-Henon and built for Alexander R. Boyd. It opened on Christmas Day 1928. Boasting an opulent Art Deco lobby, extravagant marquee and ticket booth and a 2,450 seat auditorium that featured a screen advertised as 'the largest in Philadelphia', the theater became well known among several others along Chestnut Street. It was home to several notable first run films such as The Wizard of Oz in 1939 and Gone with the Wind in 1940. Grace Kelly was present for the premiere of High Noon in 1952, in which she appeared. The theater is located at 1908 Chestnut Street.

The theater, which had been owned by Warner Bros. since shortly after its opening, was sold to The SamEric Corporation in 1971 and renamed The Sameric. The following decade, three smaller screens were added to the theater on a parcel immediately west and was renamed Sameric 4. Shortly thereafter, in 1988, the theater was sold to the United Artists Circuit.

In 1993, the theater hosted its final gala event - the world premiere of Jonathan Demme's Philadelphia, which he and film co-stars Tom Hanks and Denzel Washington attended. Tom Hanks was reportedly amazed by the theater, exclaiming "Wow, a real movie palace!"

In the subsequent years the theater became a shadow of its former self, falling into great disrepair both inside and out. By the mid 1990s, the theater became the only first-run multiplex and last non-art house movie theater in Center City. The property was purchased from United Artists in 1998 by the Philadelphia development firm The Goldenberg Group and the theater continued showing films until its last day of operation on May 2, 2002.

== The Clear Channel period ==
The fate of The Boyd remained uncertain for the years following its closing. Its owners, The Goldenberg Group, obtained a permit to demolish it shortly after its final show. In June 2002, a group of local preservationists and private citizens organized in order to persuade the owner not to demolish the structure and local government to intercede to preserve Philadelphia's sole surviving movie palace. Their cause was bolstered the following month when Preservation Pennsylvania, a statewide preservationist group, declared The Boyd as one of Pennsylvania's ten most endangered historic properties.

The property was not demolished and was purchased by Clear Channel in 2005 with the intention of expanding the theater for live productions and shoring up the building's deteriorating facade and period features. Although the restorative work was begun and the rights to an adjacent parking lot had been obtained, Live Nation, an independent company that was spun off of Clear Channel's theater operations, exited the live theater business completely and work at the Boyd ceased in 2006.

== 2008 & Beyond ==
In March 2008, the Preservation Alliance for Greater Philadelphia listed The Boyd in its Annual Endangered Properties List and two months later the National Trust for Historic Preservation named The Boyd on its 2008 List of America’s 11 Most Endangered Historic Places. In August 2008, it was listed on the Philadelphia Register of Historic Places.

In September, Philadelphia development firm ARCWheeler entered into an agreement with Live Nation to purchase the theater and announced plans to restore it into a live performance venue with two restaurants and plans for a 30-story Kimpton Hotel on the adjacent parking lot. Hal Wheeler died in January 2010 before the purchase was complete.

In 2013, upscale Florida theater chain iPic Gold Class Entertainment entered into an agreement to lease the property, under an arrangement by which Live Nation would sell the property to developer Neal Rodin. They submitted their plans to restore the original facade and to build a museum housing artifacts, photos and various related items of interest about the original Boyd. They also planned to build eight luxury theaters and an upscale restaurant/bar.

At a meeting of the Philadelphia Historical Commission on March 14, 2014, many members of the community for and against the preservation of the building provided testimony and input. Preservationists put much of their faith in the commitment from an unnamed civic-minded foundation of funds to purchase the Boyd Theatre. A former chancellor of the Philadelphia Bar Association testified that the funding commitment was real. The Commission voted 9-1 to approve the application of Live Nation and iPic.

In December 2014 Pearl Properties of Philadelphia purchased the location from Live Nation for $4.5M. No details of Pearl's future plans were provided. Demolition of the site began on Saturday, March 14, 2015.

In 2017, Pearl Properties began construction for a 24 story, 183 unit apartment tower where the Boyd's auditorium had been. Plans are for a restaurant to be in the surviving Boyd building on Chestnut Street.

== See also ==
- Last Show For Film Palace?
- Photographs of the Boyd Theatre by Matt Lambros
- Cinema Treasures - Boyd Theatre
