= Gaétan Siew =

Mauritian architect (born 1954)

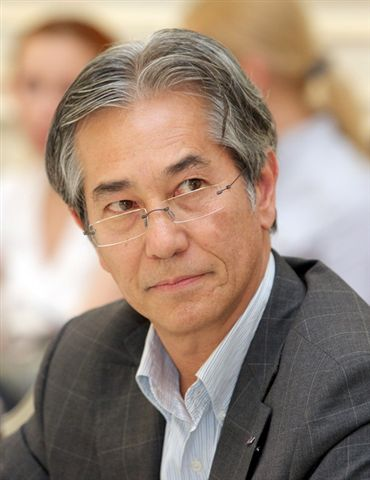
- Born: 1954 (age 71–72); Mauritius
- Occupation: Architect
- Practice: VISIO
- Projects: Institut Francais de Maurice, Sir Seewoosagur Ramgoolam International Airport, Seychelles International Airport

Gaétan Siew (Chieses: 萧晓山; born 1954) is a Mauritian architect.

== Professional career ==
Siew graduated from the École Nationale Supérieure d'Architecture de Marseille (ENSAM), France in 1979. He has been in private practice in Port Louis, Mauritius since 1981, as a founding partner of Lampotang & Siew Architects Ltd (later rebranded as VISIO in 2016). His work includes master plans for the Sir Seewoosagur Ramgoolam International Airport in Mauritius, the Chinese neighbourhood in Port Louis and the Seychelles International Airport. He has also worked in Congo, France, India, Ivory Coast, Madagascar, Mayotte, Seychelles, Swaziland, Benin, Tunisia, and many others on projects such as airports, hotels, commercial and leisure, urban planning and heritage projects. He is a frequent speaker at international conferences and has been a juror for various architecture awards.

He was elected President of the Association of Mauritian Architects in 1985, and has played an active part in the island’s urban development and environment and heritage protection programmes. He is a member of the Economic and Social Council of Mauritius.

From 1998 to 2005 he was the Secretary General of the African Union of Architects. He was elected President of the International Union of Architects during the UIA General Assembly which took place in Istanbul, Turkey, from 8 to 10 July 2005. Through his many contributions at the UIA, the most significant ones include the setting up of a joint UIA/UNESCO Charter on Architectural education, and later helping in the deployment of funds and architectural expertise in disaster struck countries. The Vice-President and candidate for Siew's successor as UIA President, Giancarlo Ius, died before he could be elected at the 2008 General Assembly in Torino. Siew then announced a triennial prize in Ius' name.

Dedicated to foster collaborations and dwell in work that catalyses physical change in our landscape, he served as a resource person to the European Commission, ICOMOS, Shanghai University and in various industry think tanks. Gaetan was also the board member of ‘Future Cities’ for the United Kingdom’s Government, and served as Chairperson for the Government of Mauritius for the Construction Industry Development Board, and for the Smart Cities driving innovative urban projects amounting to more than 4 Billion pounds. Through those positions, he played a pivotal role in the design and establishment inter-governmental agreements for emerging cities in other African countries.

== Current activities ==
Since leaving the International Union of Architects, Gaétan Siew has pursued his goal for better human development and solidarity cooperation for a sustainable world through conferences around the world as CEO of the Global Creative Leadership Initiative (GCLI).

Through his foundation, the Global Creative Leadership Foundation, Gaetan advocates for societal equity and poverty alleviation through urban innovation. His work focuses on poverty struck regions in Small Island States, and the African continent. Through his foundation he animates global conferences and shares ideas on innovative solutions for Communities, Councils and Governments.

He teaches at the University of Montpellier, France and Tsinghua University, Beijing, China on globalisation, urbanisation and architecture. He currently serves as a board member of ICOMOS, Advisory Board to the Tongji, and Shanghai College of Urbanism and Architecture. He has been engaged as an expert by the European Commission for policies on eco-innovation. He is also active in think tanks with a number of partners of the industry, namely Orange-France Smart Cities and Innovation and Plastic-Europe New sustainable materials in transport and construction. He currently serves as an advisory position to the Smart City of Zenata (Casablanca) and advises numerous bodies on urban, societal and economic regeneration.

In 2017 he was elected as the Chairperson of the Port Louis Development Initiative (PLDI), an organization set to economically and socially regenerate the capital city of Mauritius. He was further elected as the Special Envoy to UN HABITAT for the Republic of Mauritius, where he also sits on the UN HABITAT Governing Council and the UN HABITAT Committee of Permanent Representatives.

Professionally, he furthers his activities at VISIO Architecture (formerly Lampotang & Siew Architects) and consults for various African Governments on the subject of Urban Regeneration.

== Awards ==
For his contributions to society and to the field of Architecture, Gaetan Siew was honored with the following awards:

- Canada: President's Medal – Royal Architectural Institute of Canada
- Egypt: Honorary Medal – Society of Egyptian Architects
- France: Chevalier de l’Ordre National du Mérite, Chevalier of the Order of Arts and Letters (2016)
- Japan: Honorary Fellow – Japan Institute of Architects
- Mauritius: Grand Officer of Star and Key of the Indian Ocean
- Mexico: Honorary Member – Consejo Superior de Arquitectos de Mexico
- Russia: Honorary Medal – Union of Architects of Russia
- South Korea: Honorary Fellow – Architectural Institute of Korea
- Spain: Honorary Medal – Consejo Superior de los Colegios de Arquitectos de España
- United States: Presidential Medal – American Institute of Architects
- Honorary Member, World Architecture Community
- Fellow, Future Cities (UK)
- 100 Most Influential Urbanists of all times, Planetizen

Preceded by Jaime Lerner	President of the International Union of Architects; 2005–2008	Succeeded by Louise Cox
