= Bala Theatre =

Former movie theater in Bala Cynwyd, Pennsylvania

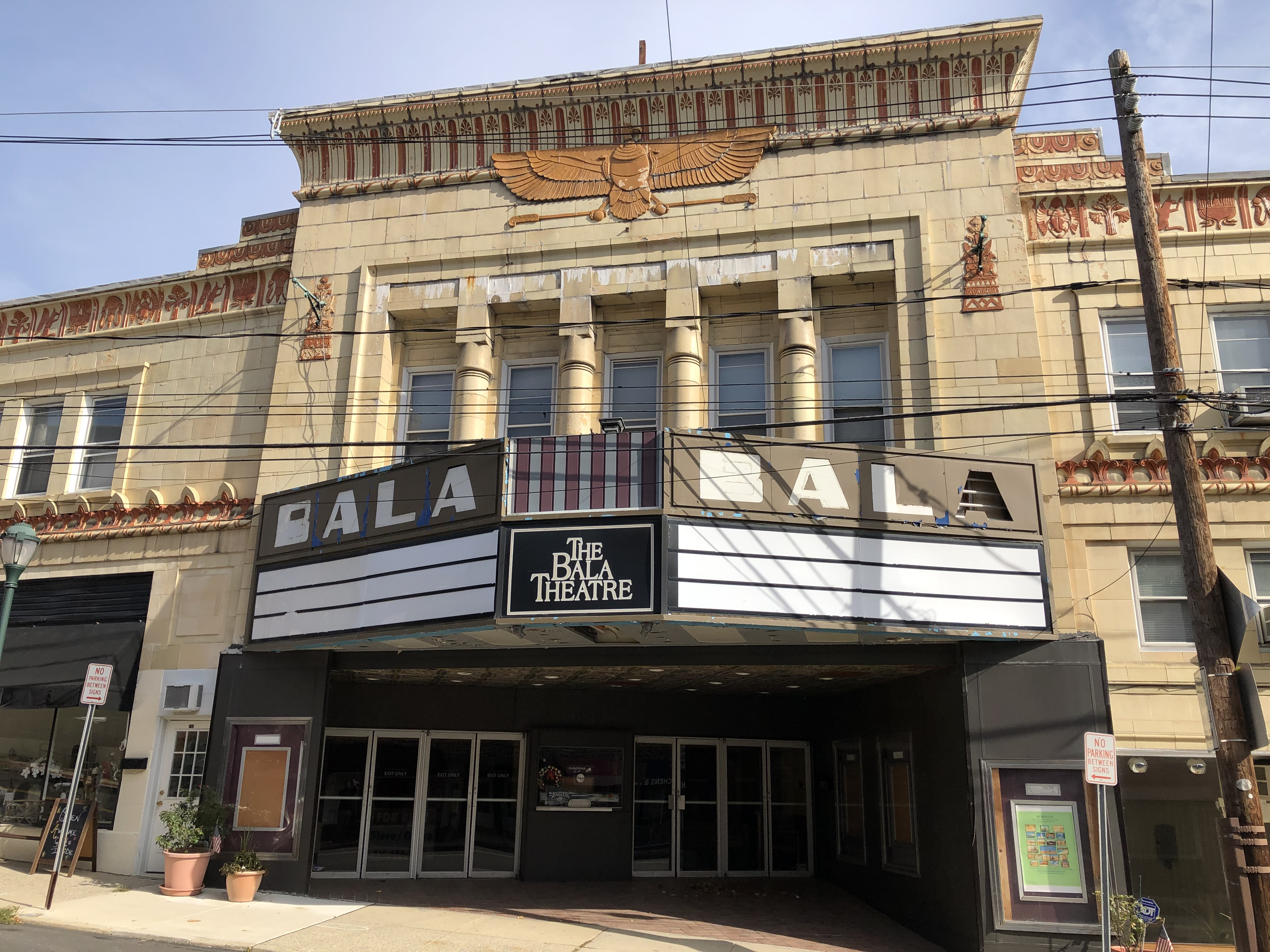
- Front of the Bala Theatre
- Interactive map of the Bala Theatre area

General information
- Architectural style: Egyptian Revival architecture
- Location: Bala Cynwyd, Pennsylvania, 157 Bala Avenue
- Coordinates: 40.00473°N 75.23180°W
- Opened: September 15, 1926

Design and construction
- Architect: Hoffman-Henon

Other information
- Seating capacity: 1,450

Bala Theatre is a historic 1926 theater building at 157 Bala Avenue in Bala Cynwyd, Pennsylvania. It was designed by Philadelphia architectural firm Hoffman-Henon. The 1,450-seat theater opened as an Egyptian Theatre on September 15, 1926. It features Egyptian Revival architecture stylings.

It was renamed the Bala in 1955 when A.M. Ellis Theatres took over the theater from the Stanley Warner Corporation. The Sotolidis family purchased it in 1987 to keep it open and it was written about in David Naylor's 1987 book, the National Trust Guide ‘Great American Movie Theatres’. It was photographed in 1994 for the Historic American Buildings Survey, a photographic collection of the Library of Congress. It was converted to a triplex in 1995.
