= The Wynne Theater =

Former movie theater in Philadelphia

General information
- Location: 54th and Arlington St, Wynnefield, Philadelphia, Pennsylvania, U.S.

The Wynne Theater was a movie theater that was located on 54th and Arlington St in the Wynnefield neighborhood of Philadelphia, Pennsylvania, United States.

== History and architectural features ==
Considered to be a Philadelphia "Landmark," this theater was built from 1927 to 1928 by Hoffman-Henon Co. for the Stanley Company of America (later Stanley Warner Theatres). Named for Thomas Wynne, the attending physician of William Penn, it showed second run films and double features and could seat 1,663 people.

In 1955, the theater closed and was taken over by the Uhr family of South Philadelphia. The building was renovated and renamed the Wynne Caterers. It then became a popular place for parties and other special events.

The last owner of the property died in 1993. With no one left to claim the space, the building remained unoccupied. In 2008, the Community Design Collaborative awarded a service grant to the Wynnefield Overbrook Revitalization Corporation (WORC) to support the creation of plans for the redevelopment of the Wynne Theater complex. A report completed in 2010 presented several options, with community members favoring the property's conversion into a community center, enabling replacement of the unsafe and damaged areas of theater, and the restoration of the historic headhouse to create a large community hall above ground level parking. The project's total cost was estimated at $6.7 million. As of January 2012, no work was begun and a developer had yet to be found to carry out the proposal.

In December 2011, the Provenance Architectural Salvage in Philadelphia removed and sold the building's neon Art Deco letters and lighting fixtures from the outside of the building, owing to concern by the Department of License and Inspections that these were a safety hazard. The marquee letters were made from enameled steel and produced locally in nearby Lansdale.
