= Louise Cox (architect) =

Australian architect

Professor Virginia Louise Cox AO
- Born: 1939 (age 86–87); New South Wales, Australia
- Education: University of Sydney
- Occupation: Architect
- Spouse: Philip Cox (sep. 1988)
- Children: 2 daughters (with Philip)
- Practice: National President of Australian Institute of Architects (1994—1995), President of International Union of Architects (2008—2010)

Virginia Louise Cox AO (née Gowing) (born 1939) is an Australian architect who has made a significant and distinguished contribution 'to architecture as a practitioner, through executive roles with international professional organisations, and to architectural education and heritage conservation'.

== Biography ==
Louise Cox graduated from the University of Sydney with a Bachelor of Architecture in 1963 from the School of Architecture, Design and Planning and later returned to study town planning, graduating in 1971. After graduating Cox worked for a year in the office of Chamberlin Powell and Bon in London before returning to Australia to work in the office of Peddle Thorp & Walker, Sydney. In 1968 she worked as an architect and associate at McConnell Smith and Johnson before becoming a director from 1980 to 1997, during which time she made a leading contribution to the advancement of heritage and health care design through the delivery of many significant projects in Australia and Malaysia.

Beyond practice in architecture and planning, Cox has dedicated over fifty years of service to the advocacy of the profession through many organisations and government boards. After joining as a student member in the sixties, from 1986 to 1996 Cox became highly involved in the Australian Institute of Architects, serving on numerous local and national committees.

Cox was the first woman president of the New South Wales Chapter of the Royal Australian Institute of Architects (1988–90). As the 56th National President of the Royal Australian Institute of Architects (1994–1995), she was the first woman to serve in this role.

In 1992, Cox was elected to the International Union of Architects (UIA) and was its president from 2008 to 2011. Her work with the UIA has encompassed key roles in the development of the UNESCO-UIA Charter for Architectural Education, the Education Policy Paper, the UNESCO-UIA Validation System and the UN-HABITAT World Urban Campaign.

Cox is an adjunct professor at the University of NSW.

== Professional career ==
Cox has served on almost thirty boards and high-level committees in a range of professional areas including as a member of the Heritage Council of New South Wales, as a member of many advisory committees assisting the New South Wales and Commonwealth governments in the areas of architecture, construction, housing, public works and building standards, and as treasurer and president of Docomomo. In addition, Cox has contributed to education through significant roles with the University of Sydney and the University of New South Wales, where she is an adjunct professor.

Cox has been an active and highly involved member of the Australian Institute of Architects for well over fifty years and was the first woman to become National President in 1994. This followed an earlier term as the New South Wales Chapter's first woman President in 1988–90, and her roles on numerous Institute committees at state and national level.

Cox was made a member (AM) of the General Division of the Order of Australia in 1999.

She was elected as the International Union of Architects (UIA) Councillor for Region IV (Asia and Oceania) in 1996, and became the vice-president for Region IV in 2002.

In 2008 Cox became the president of the International Union of Architects (UIA), a role she held for three years until 2011. In its sixty years until then the UIA had only had one president from the Asia and Oceania region: India's Jai Bhalla in 1978. "It's really important for this region to be understood by the rest of the world," Cox said when she took on the role.

Cox's work with the UIA encompassed key roles in the development of the UNESCO-UIA Charter for Architectural Education, the associated Education Policy Paper, the UNESCO-UIA Validation System and the UN-HABITAT World Urban Campaign.

In 2011 Cox was presented the insignia of Knight in the Order of Arts and Letters by Frédéric Mitterrand, French Minister for Culture and Communication. Mitterrand applauded Cox for her "exemplary attention to natural and urban contexts, respect of the environment and its transformation". Mitterrand concluded that: “Through your energetic involvement and your federative enthusiasm, you offer a major contribution to the new orientation of the architecture of tomorrow where the aesthetic is more than ever interwoven with the principle of responsibility.”

In 2013 Cox was awarded the Australian Institute of Architects National President's Prize (2013). The Jury's citation stated that "Her enormous gift to architecture and the profession both here and overseas has been passionate, tenacious, pragmatic, dedicated and a selfless offering to the greater good. She has been selected as the recipient of the President's Prize in recognition of this sustained commitment and her far-reaching work in service to architecture and its value to the wider community."

In 2014 Cox was made an Officer of the Order of Australia (AO), the highest recognition for outstanding achievement and service to country, for "distinguished service to architecture as a practitioner, through executive roles with international professional organisations, and to architectural education and heritage conservation".

== Personal life ==
Virginia Louise Gowing grew up on the Upper North Shore of Sydney. Her father Bob was part of the family that owned Gowings, a department store chain in Sydney established in 1868, and he worked in retail. Her mother Bettina Gowing (née Kessell) raised a family of four children. Louise married Philip Cox, a fellow architect, in Sydney in April 1972. They have two daughters, Charlotte and Sophie.

== Awards ==
- 1999: Appointed a Member of the General Division of the Order of Australia for services to architecture;
- 2003: Marion Mahony Griffin Prize, Australian Institute of Architects;
- 2003: Outstanding Service-board member, Standards Australia;
- 2011: Knight in the Order of Arts and Letters (Chevalier d'Ordre des Arts et des Lettres), France
- 2013: Presidents Prize, Australian Institute of Architects;
- 2014: Appointed an Officer of the General Division of the Order of Australia for services to architecture

Professional and academic associations
| Preceded by Lawrence Nield | President of the Royal Australian Institute of Architects (NSW Chapter); 1988–1990 | Succeeded by Richard Dinham |
| Preceded by | National President of the Royal Australian Institute of Architects; 1994–1995 | Succeeded by |
| Preceded by Gaétan Siew | President of the International Union of Architects; 2008–2011 | Succeeded by Albert Dubler |
