= Rod Hackney =

British architect (1942–2025)

- Born: 3 March 1942; Liverpool, England
- Died: 14 August 2025 (aged 83)
- Education: Manchester University
- Occupation: Architect
- Known for: Community Architecture
- Website: www.kansarahackney.com/kh/Dr_Rod_Hackney.html

Roderick Peter Hackney (3 March 1942 – 14 August 2025) was a British architect and past president of the Royal Institute of British Architects (1987–1989) and International Union of Architects.

Hackney was considered the pioneer of "Community Architecture" in 1974, when he fought slum clearances in Macclesfield and helped local people improve their own surroundings.

== Life and career ==
Hackney was born in Liverpool, England on 3 March 1942. He studied architecture at Manchester University, graduating in 1965. He then worked at Arne Jacobsen's practice in Denmark for three years before returning to Manchester to undertake a PhD.

In 1972, he formed his own practice Rod Hackney Architect in Macclesfield, and in 2008 he co-founded Kansara Hackney Ltd.

Hackney died of kidney failure on 14 August 2025, at the age of 83.

== Publications ==
- "Forward". Building Communities: International Conference Proceedings. RIBA Enterprises. 1987. ISBN 0947877711.
- Hackney, Rod; Fay Sweet (1990). The good, the bad, and the ugly: cities in crisis (1. publ. ed.). London: F. Muller. ISBN 9780091739393.
