= National Council of Structural Engineers Associations =

- Abbreviation: NCSEA
- Established: 1993
- Type: Structural engineering professional association
- Purpose: NCSEA, in partnership with its Member Organizations, supports practicing structural engineers to be highly qualified professionals and successful leaders.
- Region served: United States of America
- Services: Professional membership; Find An Engineer; Magazine; Library
- Members: 12,000
- Board of directors: Ed Quesenberry, President; David Horos, Vice President; Ryan Kersting, Secretary; Christopher Cerino, Treasurer; Eli Gottlieb, Director; Jami Lorenz, Director; Sarah Appleton, Director; Brian Petruzzi, Director; Emily Guglielmo, Past President
- Website: http://www.ncsea.com/

The National Council of Structural Engineers Associations (NCSEA) is a professional association in the United States, with member organizations in 44 states. NCSEA was established in 1993. As of 2003, NCSEA represented 12,000 individual engineers, who are members of local state associations.

NCSEA advances the practice of structural engineering and, as the national voice for practicing structural engineers, protects the public's right to safe, sustainable and cost effective buildings, bridges and other structures. It was formed to constantly improve the level of standard of practice of the structural engineering profession throughout the United States, and to provide an identifiable resource for those needing communication with the profession. NCSEA serves the needs of the structural engineering profession, its clientele, as well as architects, building code and enforcement authorities, construction industry, owners, developers, public building agencies, disaster response organizations, licensing and registration boards, legislatures and regulatory agencies, structural material trade groups, public news media, professional and trade organizations, and engineering societies.

NCSEA publishes STRUCTURE Magazine, which provides resources to engage and empower structural engineers. This publication covers topics pertinent to the ongoing education of practicing engineers, such as technical updates, building code reviews, innovative solutions, and project highlights.

== See also ==
- Delaware Valley Association of Structural Engineers
- Structural Engineers Association of Northern California
