= Erlanger Theatre =

Former theater and movie theater in Philadelphia, Pennsylvania, United States

Coordinates: 39.95387°N 75.17514°W

- Interactive map of Erlanger Theatre
- Address: NW Corner 21st & Market Street; Philadelphia, Pennsylvania; United States
- Owner: Abraham Lincoln Erlanger
- Capacity: 1,890

Construction
- Opened: October 23, 1927
- Demolished: 1978
- Years active: 1927-1978
- Architect: Hoffman-Henon Associates

The Erlanger Theatre was a live-performance theater at the northwest corner of 21st and Market Streets in Philadelphia, Pennsylvania. It was built in 1927 by Abraham L. Erlanger, theatrical producer and a founding member of the Theatrical Syndicate. It was demolished in 1978.

== History ==
The Erlanger, which opened on October 23, 1927, with the musical show Criss Cross, was equipped to facilitate multiple venues for both live theater and motion pictures. It was constructed to replace the entertainment gap left by the original Forrest Theatre (demolished in 1927) that was located about 20 blocks southeast on South Broad Street. Originally, Abraham Lincoln Erlanger and the Shubert Organization were working together, but the two theater operators went their separate ways and the Shubert Organization built a new Forrest Theatre on Walnut Street.

Starting in 1968, the Erlanger Theatre was adapted for reuse as a restaurant, a night club, a venue for rock shows, and used for Broadway theatre productions. The theatre, by then known as Café Erlanger, was successful socially but not financially, and was closed and quickly demolished in 1978. The site remained vacant until 2008, when the Murano, a condominium skyscraper, was built on the site.

== Architecture ==
Philadelphia theater architects Hoffman-Henon designed the theater. The exterior embodied the Georgian architecture style. The interior had three lobbies, grand stairs, lounges, and a 1,890 seat auditorium. The interior design theme consisted of elaborated decorations, furnished with imported marble, gold leaf, murals, tapestries, crystal chandeliers, crystal mirrors, antique woodwork, hand-wrought ironwork, and elaborate Napoleonic French-inspired furniture. The designated lounge for smoking, known as the Spanish Lounge, was considered to be magnificent.

== Productions ==
The Erlanger opened October 23, 1927 with the musical show Criss Cross. The theater was also equipped to show movies. RKO began a lease on September 29, 1929 to show first-run movies. RKO’s first “talkie” motion picture, Street Girl, had its premiere at this theatre. However, the Erlanger was most famous for pre-Broadway musical stage shows such as Guys and Dolls, West Side Story, Man of La Mancha, My Fair Lady and other productions.
