= Thomas Vonier =

Paris-based American architect

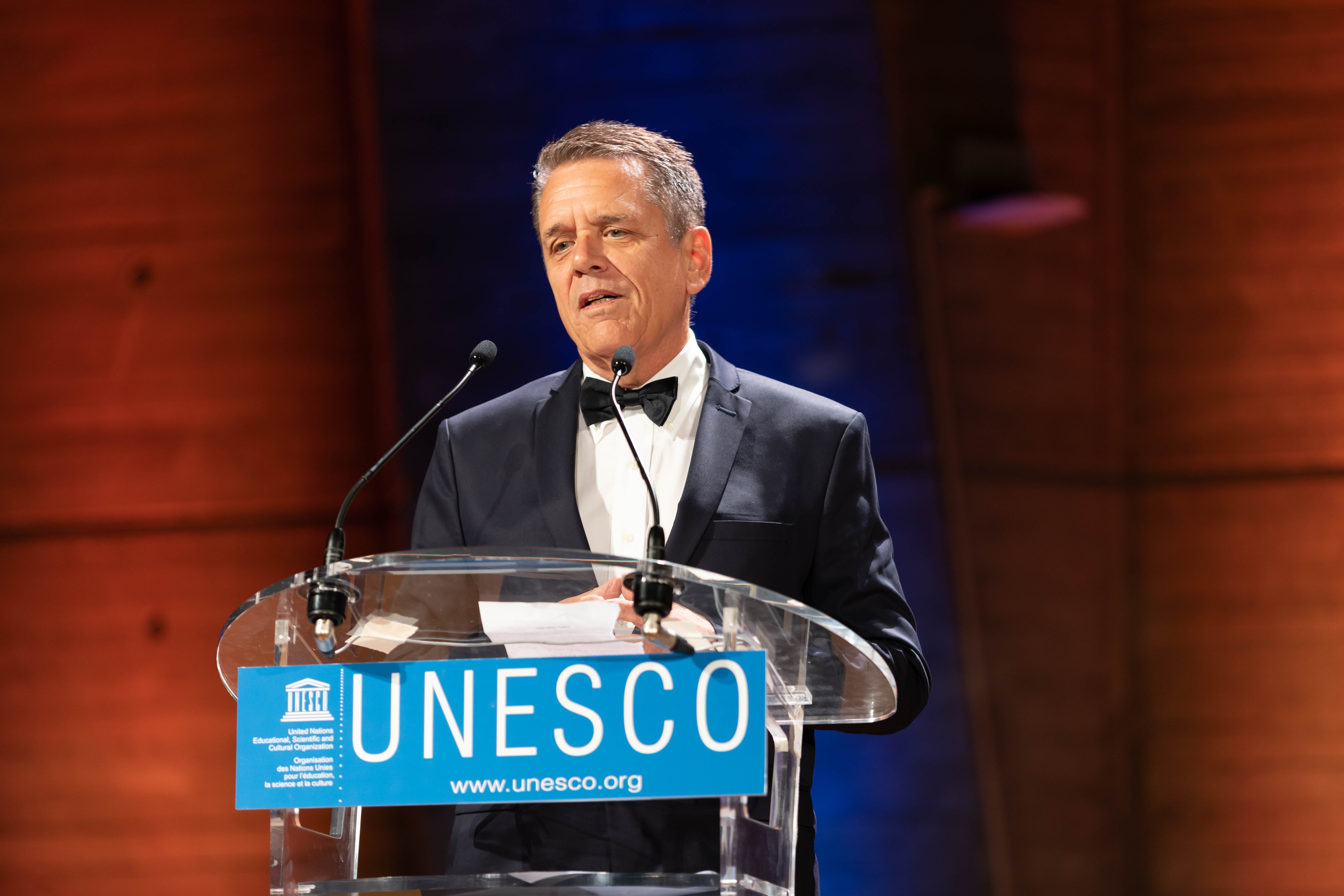
- Vonier at the Prix Versailles ceremony (2019)
- Education: Washington University in St. Louis; University of Wisconsin–Milwaukee
- Occupation: Architect

Thomas Vonier (FAIA, RIBA) is an architect with a private practice based in Paris and Washington D.C. He is a senior partner in Chesapeake Strategies Ltd, advising organizations on innovations in the building, design, security, and urban sectors.

Vonier is a leading advocate for applying research to architectural design, advancing the use of innovative technologies in buildings and cities, and integrating unobtrusive security measures with architecture and urban design. He speaks frequently to public and professional audiences.

Atlantic magazine's "CityLab" featured Vonier in its live session with New York mayor Michael Bloomberg and Paris mayor Anne Hidalgo, to address contemporary challenges facing the world's major cities. He appeared on the NPR program All Things Considered, and on the WBUR program Here and Now, in features on urban security. He was the international advisor to the Federal Triangle Security project, which received a Presidential Design Award.

The 95,000-member American Institute of Architects elected Vonier as its national president for 2017. Delegates to the World Congress of Architects, held in Seoul, elected Vonier as UIA president from 2017 to 2021, representing the world's 3.2 million architects.

Vonier has worked as an architect with many public and private international organisations in the United States and abroad. He led the work to produce landmark reforms in embassy design, implemented by the US Secretary of State. He has completed work on educational facilities, corporate office buildings, hotels and resorts, consulates and embassies, public buildings, and retail complexes.

== Education ==
Vonier studied architecture at Washington University in St. Louis and at the University of Wisconsin–Milwaukee, earning Bachelor of Science in Architecture and Master of Architecture degrees. He served as a research affiliate with the MIT Laboratory of Architecture and Planning, and organized Summer Institute programmes at MIT and the Harvard Graduate School of Design.

== Career ==
Vonier had the opportunity early in his life to tour Taliesin East with Frank Lloyd Wright. He cites that experience as the beginning of his lifelong interest in architecture. He worked throughout high school and college for architects and industrial designers.

Prior to entering university, Vonier worked for industrial designer Brooks Stevens, who produced designs for the Avanti, the Studebaker Hawk, the Jeepster and the Jeep Wagoneer, the AMC Pacer, the Excalibur SS, the Harley Davidson Sportster motorcycle, and many other recreational vehicles and household products. During his work with Brooks Stevens, Vonier developed skills in sketching, mechanical drawing, modelmaking, shop techniques, and illustration.

As a graduate student in architecture, Vonier received a fellowship from the National Science Foundation to study museum design. The fellowship sent him to Washington D.C., where he worked with the Smithsonian Institution and the American Association for the Advancement of Science.

His study of modern display and exhibition methods led him to meet with Roy Disney, the brother of Walt Disney, and to take an immersion course with the Disney "Imagineering" team in Anaheim, California. The fellowship culminated in a book on public participation in design policy and decision-making.

Vonier was encouraged to pursue international work by Ron Herron, a member of Archigram in London, and Nathaniel Owings, a founding partner in SOM, chair of the Pennsylvania Avenue Development Commission, both of whom came to know Vonier when he was a student.

After the fellowship in Washington D.C., Vonier took a break from studies to work and travel in Europe. He sailed from New York on the SS France and found work in London for a hotel developer in the Pimlico neighbourhood. He then went to Vienna, Austria, collaborating with architects Hannes Lintl and Rudolf Keiml.

After returning to the US to complete graduate studies, Vonier became a program manager with the AIA Research Corporation. He led projects in energy conservation, passive solar energy use, seismic design, and adaptive re-use of historic buildings. He was part of a group of young architects doing work during the mid-1970s on energy conscious design and the use of solar and wind energy.

Vonier was the founding president of AIA Continental Europe, one of the seven chapters of the American Institute of Architects (1994-1995). He was the first president of the AIA International Region and chairman of the jury for Honorary Fellows of the American Institute of Architects. In 2010, he was named AIA 2010-2012 board of directors, as the AIA's international director. He became president of the AIA in 2017.

Based in Paris and Washington D.C., Vonier's practice serves public and private clients with global industrial operations. He also works with municipalities to improve urban security. As a board certified security professional, Vonier led groundbreaking research for US embassies and consulates, resulting in landmark recommendations to the Secretary of State and a new generation of design criteria. He was international advisor to the Federal Triangle planning project, which received a Presidential Design Award.

With a group of young architects in Washington D.C., Vonier pioneered work in energy conscious design and the use of solar and wind energy. He was part of the team that received a P/A Design Award for the College of the Atlantic in Bar Harbor, Maine. He received the Henry Adams Award for his research on public museums, completed under a fellowship from the National Science Foundation.

An award-winning author on both architecture and security, Tom was the European correspondent for Progressive Architecture magazine, where his work was nominated for the Jesse H. Neal Award.

Vonier was also liaison delegate to the Architects' Council of Europe in Brussels. He was elected to serve as Secretary General of the International Union of Architects (UIA) in Paris, and leads in its roles with UNESCO, the WTO and various world heritage and climate organizations. He has lectured widely on architecture, and served as a research affiliate with the Laboratory of Architecture and Planning at MIT.

== Private architecture practice ==
Vonier established a private practice in Washington D.C. upon becoming licensed as an architect. Now based both in Paris and in Washington D.C., his practice serves public and private clients with global operations. He also consults with municipalities to improve urban security.

Vonier was senior security advisor for overseas operations and facilities to the Halliburton corporation, reporting directly to its chief executive, Dick Cheney. He led multiple "red team" exercises, conducted post-incident analyses, and designed security upgrades for sites operated worldwide by Halliburton and its subsidiary, Brown & Root. He led evaluations of NATO operational sites and billeting facilities, and assessments of field offices and oilfield worksites in Eastern Europe, Eurasia, and North Africa.

During his tenure as European vice president for ASIS International, the global security organisation, Vonier was senior advisor to the International Centre for Urban Security in Barcelona. He worked with the Rand Corporation on comparative municipal security studies in the aftermath of motor vehicle attacks in Nice, New York, and Barcelona.

His practice has worked numerous US government agencies and departments, including the National Park Service, the US Department of Energy, and the US Department of Housing and Urban Development. His firm also worked with the State of California on energy conservation codes, and with the National Trust for Historic Preservation on design guidelines for historic properties.

In addition to the US Department of State and the National Park Service, his firm has worked for UN-ESCAP, Butler Manufacturing (now Bluesteel), the City of Yokohama, and multiple private corporations.

A board-certified security professional, Vonier led research on improving security in embassies and consulates, resulting in landmark recommendations to the US Secretary of State and a new generation of embassy design criteria. He was the international advisor to the Federal Triangle project, which won a Presidential Design Award.

== Writing, public speaking, and broadcast appearances ==
Vonier has authored many articles on architecture, urban design, and security. He is a skilled public speaker and often appears in media broadcasts. He frequently delivers keynote speeches at professional events.

Following the January 6 2021 attack on the US Capitol, he testified before Congress on potential security enhancements for the building and grounds. He also appeared on a Newsy feature story about the incident and its implications.

He was featured in the Atlantic CityLab program with New York mayor Michael Bloomberg and Paris mayor Anne Hidalgo. He appeared on the NPR program All Things Considered, and the WBUR program Here and Now in features on urban security. Vonier appeared on the CBS Evening News in a segment on façade preservation in historic neighbourhoods. He gave keynote speeches for Prague Architecture Week, for the London Security Conference, and for the World Canals Conference in Leipzig.

Vonier served for fifteen years as the European correspondent for Progressive Architecture magazine, and the industry nominated his "Technics" articles for the Jesse H. Neal Award. Vonier wrote the chapter on contemporary construction systems in the Building Systems Integration Handbook published by John Wiley & Sons.

== President of the AIA / American Institute of Architects ==
Shortly after establishing his office in Paris, France, Vonier founded AIA Continental Europe, chartered in 1994 as an offshore chapter of the American Institute of Architects, with members from Ireland to Russia and from Turkey to Finland. Vonier then established and served as the first president of AIA's International Region, incorporating members in all countries outside the United States. The AIA appointed Vonier to its board of directors in 2010. In 2016, the 95,000-member Institute elected him as its president. At the AIA Conference on Architecture in Orlando, Florida, Vonier interviewed former First Lady Michelle Obama, his invited guest, in front of more than ten thousand people. He also invited Diébédo Francis Kéré and Alejandro Aravena to give presentations on their work.

== President of the UIA / International Union of Architects ==
During the 2017 UIA World Congress of Architects in Seoul, South Korea, delegates from all over the world elected Vonier to serve as UIA president, a post he held from 2017 to 2021. He had previously served as the UIA Secretary General.

From the UIA's headquarters in Paris, Vonier led in renewing the organisation's work with UNESCO, UN Habitat, and other international heritage and design institutions. Under his leadership, the UIA established the UNESCO/UIA World Capital of Architecture programme. With Audrey Azoulay, UNESCO director general, and Georg Pendl, president of the Architects’ Council of Europe, Vonier co-chaired the international conference on design competitions

== Personal life ==
Vonier maintains residences in France and the United States. An avid cyclist, he followed the Tour de France and wrote about the experience for The Washington Post. An amateur musician, he played in a rock group whose other members went on to join Talking Heads (Jerry Harrison), to tour and record for decades with Leonard Cohen (Bob Metzger), and to record and tour with Johnny Winter (Jon Paris). As a college student, Vonier worked during vacations as an assistant floor manager for the NBC Today program, handling props and sets for Frank Blair, Frank McGee, and Barbara Walters. He is a motorcyclist, owning a succession of Ducati, BMW, and Honda two-wheelers.

== Honors and awards ==
Vonier was made an Honorary Member of the Australian Institute of Architects, and an Honorary Fellow of the Royal Architectural Institute of Canada. The American Institute of Architects elevated him to the College of Fellows in 2006.

He is an elected member of the Royal Institute of British Architects. The International Academy of Architecture inducted Vonier into its ranks in 2018. The Consortium for Sustainable Urbanism in New York gave Vonier its Champion Award.

With Edward Larrabee Barnes as lead architect, Vonier was part of the team to win a P/A Design Award for the College of the Atlantic in Bar Harbour, Maine. He received the Henry Adams Award for Excellence in Architecture for graduate research on public museums, funded by the National Science Foundation.

== Recent appearances ==
Vonier served as an official delegate to the United Nations conferences on climate change—COP 21 (Paris), COP 22 (Marrakesh) and COP 26 (Glasgow)—and as a delegate to UN Habitat III (Quito) and the UN World Urban Forum 9 (Kuala Lumpur).

He delivered the keynote address on "Architecture and Water" to the 2022 World Canals Conference in Leipzig, Germany. He also opened the 2022 Architecture Week in Prague, and made the keynote opening lecture to the Design Science Conference of the Tsinghua University School of Architecture in Beijing.
