= Masjid Al-Jamia =

Sunni mosque in Philadelphia, Pennsylvania, U.S.

Al-Jamia Mosque
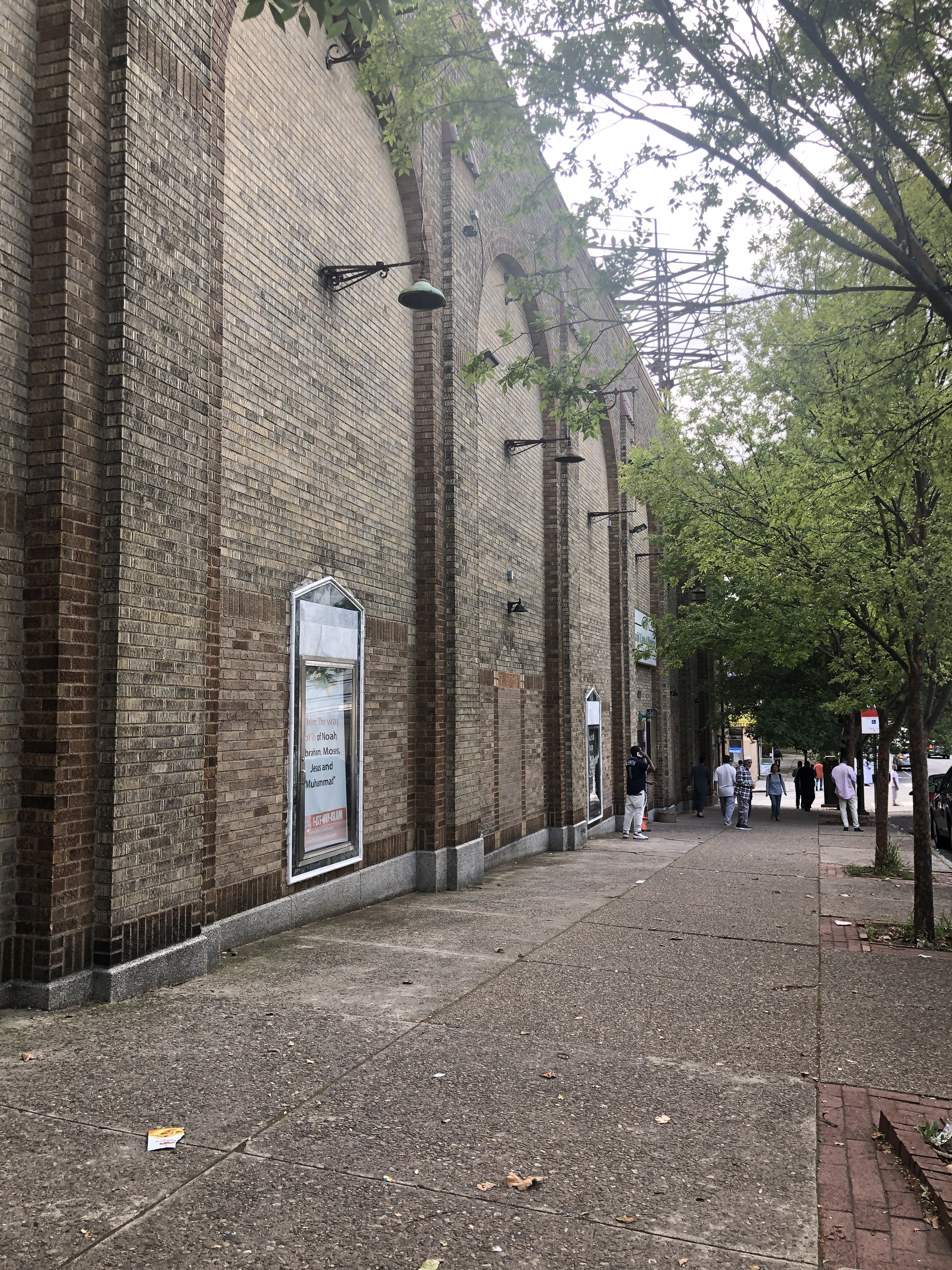

- Location of the mosque in Philadelphia

Religion
- Affiliation: Sunni Islam
- Ecclesiastical or organisational status: Mosque
- Status: Active

Location
- Location: West Philadelphia, Pennsylvania
- Country: United States
- Coordinates: 39°57′17.0″N 75°12′30.6″W

Architecture
- Type: Mosque
- Established: 1988

Website
- https://www.masjidaljamia.com

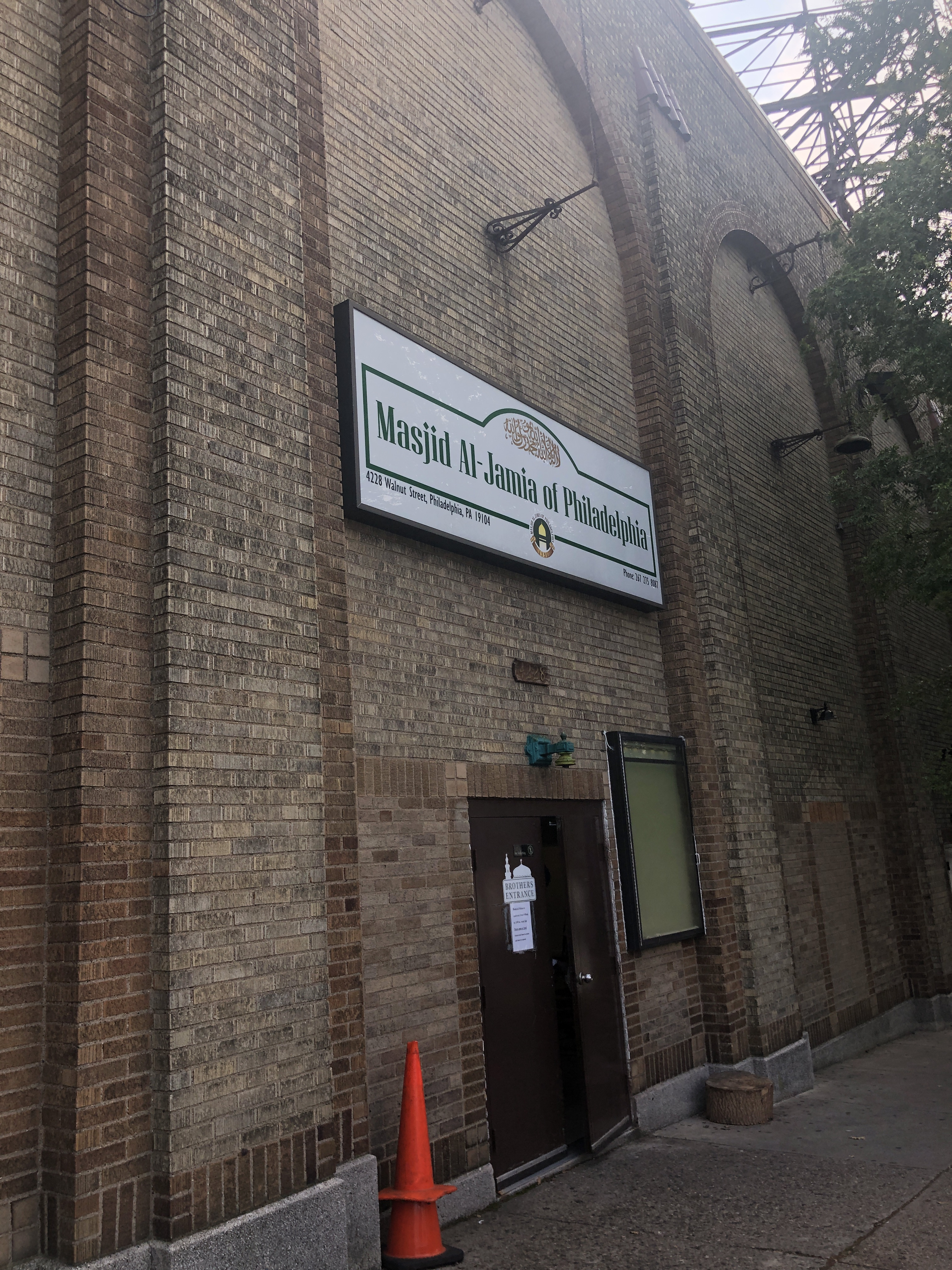
Masjid Al-Jamia of Philadelphia main door on Walnut Street

Masjid Al-Jamia is a Sunni mosque in West Philadelphia. It was founded in 1988 by members of the Muslim Students Association at the University of Pennsylvania (Penn MSA). Eight years later, the mosque became independent from the Penn MSA and, around 2009, acquired ownership of the building. Located at 4228 Walnut Street, in a historic building formerly occupied by the Commodore Theatre, the mosque currently serves a large and diverse Muslim population in the neighborhood. The mosque's name itself signals its importance to the community, as the Arabic etymology suggests. In Arabic, Masjid Al-Jamia means “the congregational mosque”, typically where Muslims meet for Friday prayers.

== Worship and services ==
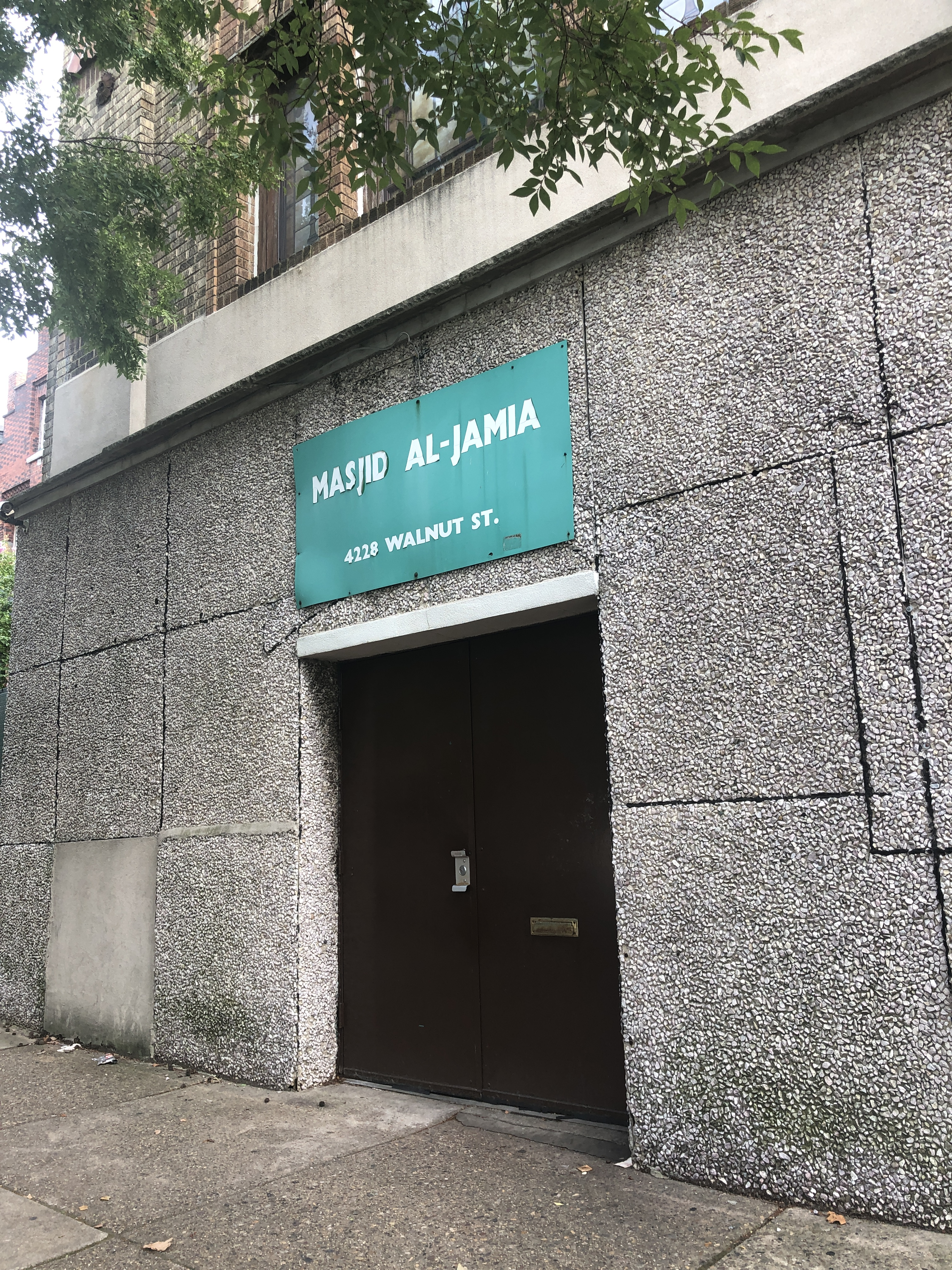
Side door of Masjid Al-Jamia

The Masjid Al-Jamia offers religious services for the five daily prayers common to Muslims, and for the Friday congregational prayer. It also sponsors regular lectures, an annual Ramadan program associated with the month of fasting, and prayers for the ‘Eid holidays. The mosque also provides an Islamic School for children. As of 2019, the imam was Yahaya A Adam. Previous Imams have included Ali A Farooqi and Abdel Mohsen Hatab.

== Ownership and administration ==
As a non-profit organization, Masjid Al-Jamia is independently administered. According to City of Philadelphia property records, the owner of the mosque building, which is located at 4228 Walnut Street and which covers 12,541 square feet, is the North American Islamic Trust, Inc. This organization, NAIT, identifies the building as an Islamic charitable endowment, or waqf. Founded in 1973 by the national Muslim Students Association – an umbrella organization that helps to coordinate Muslim student activities on college and university campuses throughout the United States – NAIT declared on its website in 2019 that it was holding titles to mosques as waqfs in over forty U.S. states, with the goal of ensuring their long-term stability.

== Building ==
Masjid Al-Jamia occupies the site of a former movie theater, the Commodore Theatre, which opened in 1928 and originally held 1,105 seats. The building has a distinctive architectural style. Designed by the Ballinger Company, in association with the architects Hoffman & Henon, the edifice reflected the Spanish Revival or Moorish architectural style, which was popular in the 1920s. After its closure in the late 1950s, the building briefly held a live theater. As indicated in a photograph from the Urban Archives of Temple University Libraries, the building housed a church called the “Miracle Revival Tabernacle” in 1964.

== History ==
Historically the Masjid Al-Jamia has had a close relationship with sections of the Muslim community at the University of Pennsylvania, whose campus is located in West Philadelphia. As part of a community history project aided by Scribe Video Center, interviewees recalled many occasions when members of the Masjid Al-Jamia community gathered with Penn Muslim students for Islamic study circles, social events, Friday prayers and holiday celebrations.

In particular, the mosque has had relations with the Penn Muslim Students Association (“Penn MSA”), which is the University of Pennsylvania chapter of the nationwide organization, MSA National. MSA National was founded in 1963 to facilitate Muslim life among students in diverse campus settings. Today, the MSA chapters – Penn’s included – work under the umbrella of the Islamic Society of North America, which declares its mission to “foster the development of the Muslim community, interfaith relations, civic engagement, and better understandings of Islam.”

== Community ==
Masjid Al-Jamia stands at the heart of what has become “the city’s biggest and most diverse Muslim community”, including members who have immigrated from many countries including Bangladesh, Mali, and Egypt. An article published in 2011 in The Philadelphia Inquirer featured the mosque and described members like Mohammed Mahsin Khan, a 39-year-old Bangladeshi, who explained that prior to its establishment, he drove to New Jersey or to Northeast Philadelphia to pray.

== See also ==
- Islam in the United States
- List of mosques in the United States
