= Louis de Moll =

American architect (1924–2013)

- Born: August 19, 1924; Swarthmore, Pennsylvania
- Died: October 15, 2013 (aged 89); Newtown Square, Pennsylvania
- Occupation: Architect
- Awards: Fellow of the American Institute of Architects
- Practice: Ballinger Company

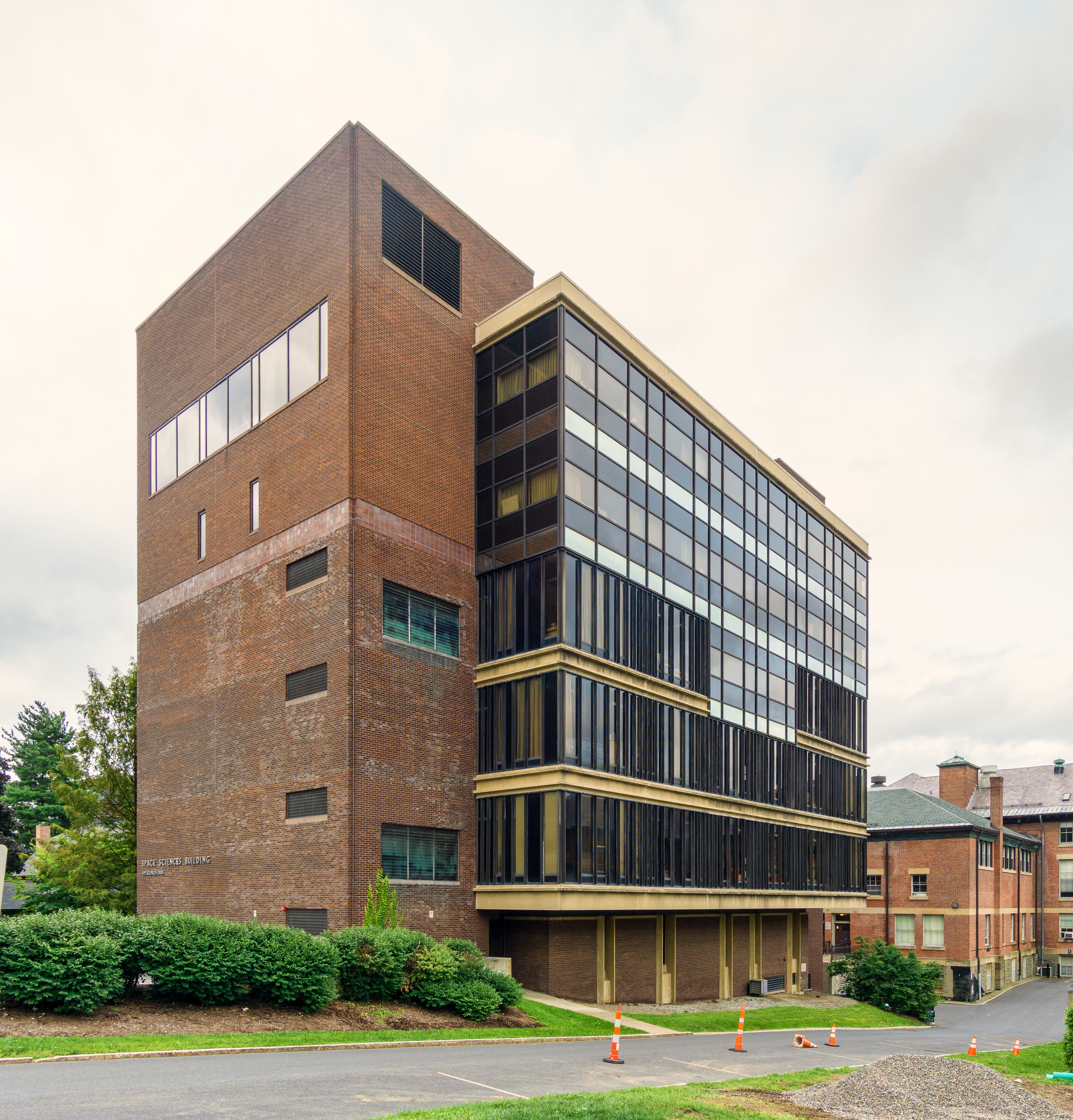
The Space Sciences Building of Cornell University, designed by Ballinger under de Moll's supervision and completed in 1968.

Louis de Moll FAIA (19 August 1924 – 15 October 2013) was an American architect active in Philadelphia from 1955 to 1986. He spent his entire career with the Ballinger Company and was president of the American Institute of Architects for the year 1976 and of the International Union of Architects for 1978–81.

== Life and career ==
Louis de Moll was born August 19, 1924, in Swarthmore, Pennsylvania to Carl de Moll, an architect for the Ballinger Company, and Mary (Hitchner) de Moll. He was educated at the University of Pennsylvania, graduating in 1949 with a BArch. During World War II he served in the United States Army. After graduation he joined Ballinger, where his father was now a partner. In 1955, he joined the partnership, which by then also included his brother, John D. de Moll. De Moll served as partner in charge of design and in 1965 he was appointed vice president of operations. In the same year, his brother became president. He became chair of the board of directors in 1974 and CEO in 1984.

As partner in charge of design de Moll led the design of many major Ballinger projects, including the former Embassy of the United States in Kabul, buildings for the University of Pennsylvania and several corporate headquarters. As his administrative duties increased, de Moll was no longer able to supervise design and William R. Gustafson was hired as director of design in 1976. In 1986 the de Moll brothers retired. They owned the majority of the company and were bought out by a group of employees led by Frank J. Butler, director of project management, Gustafson, director of design and Frank C. Guzzi, director of marketing.

De Moll joined the American Institute of Architects in 1955 as a member of the Philadelphia chapter. In 1964–65 he chaired a chapter task force aimed at expanding the chapter's programs within the Philadelphia community and served as chapter president for 1967–68. He was elected a fellow in 1966. He then served on several national committees and was elected vice president in 1972 and 1973. In 1974, he was elected first vice president/president elect for 1975 and president for 1976. As president de Moll focused on controlling costs in the aftermath of the 1973–1975 recession.

De Moll participated in several working groups of the International Union of Architects (UIA) during the 1970s and when UIA members encouraged the AIA to run an American candidate for president of the organization, they nominated de Moll. He was elected to a three-year term as president in 1978. He was then a member of the council until 1984. In recognition of his leadership of the AIA and the UIA, de Moll was elected to honorary membership in the national architectural associations of Bolivia, Bulgaria, Canada, Chili, Hungary, Mexico, Spain, Uruguay and Venezuela and the Pan American Federation of Architects' Associations (FPAA).

== Personal life ==
De Moll was married in 1947 to Carol Maude Froebel. They had five children and in 1950 settled in Rose Valley, a community developed by architect William Lightfoot Price. Carl de Moll, who had also been Price's brother-in-law, had been among the community's first residents. De Moll and his wife lived in a house designed by himself until 2006. He died October 15, 2013, in a retirement home in Newtown Square.

== Architectural works ==
Projects completed by the Ballinger Company during de Moll's period as partner in charge of design include:

- Ocean City Tabernacle, 550 Wesley Ave, Ocean City, New Jersey (1958)
- IBM Supplies Division headquarters (former), 431 Ridge Rd, Dayton, New Jersey (1962)
- Unisys headquarters, 801 Lakeview Dr, Blue Bell, Pennsylvania (1965)
- Embassy of the United States (former), Great Massoud Rd, Kabul, Afghanistan (1967)
- Space Sciences Building, Cornell University, Ithaca, New York (1968)
- McNeil Building, University of Pennsylvania, Philadelphia (1970)

Other projects completed by Ballinger during de Moll's leadership include:

- Gimbels, 901 Market St, Philadelphia (1977)
- William J. Hughes Technical Center, Egg Harbor Township, New Jersey (1980)
- Wills Eye Hospital, 900 Walnut St, Philadelphia (1980)
- One Independence Mall, 615 Chestnut St, Philadelphia (1981)
