= Delaware Valley Association of Structural Engineers =

The Delaware Valley Association of Structural Engineers (DVASE) is a structural engineering association established in 1991. Its headquarters are in Fort Washington, Pennsylvania, and its member firms are located in Pennsylvania and New Jersey. It is officially the eastern chapter of the Structural Engineers Association of Pennsylvania. Initially a monthly discussion group for business and liability issues, DVASE has since grown and evolved to provide educational offerings.

== See also ==
- National Council of Structural Engineers Associations
