= Wisconsin Institutes for Discovery =

Coordinates: 43.072916°N 89.408095°W

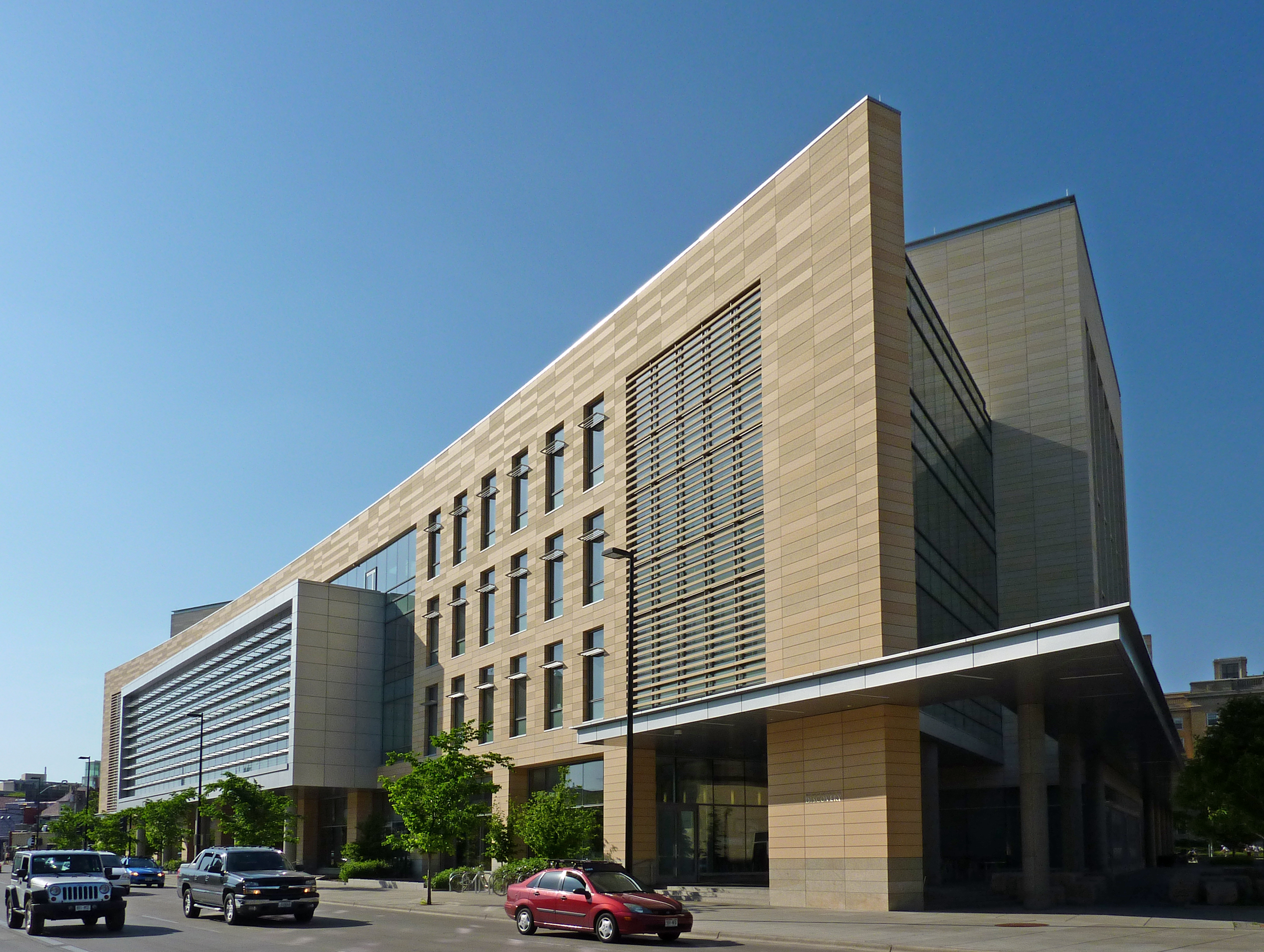
Wisconsin Institutes for Discovery

The Wisconsin Institutes for Discovery is a public-private research and outreach partnership that is located in the Discovery Building on the University of Wisconsin–Madison campus. It consists of two institutions: the privately funded Morgridge Institute for Research, and the publicly funded Wisconsin Institute for Discovery (WID). Both institutes opened in 2010.

The Wisconsin Institute for Discovery is led by Jo Handelsman, who was appointed in February, 2017, after serving in the Obama White House's Office of Science and Technology Policy. The WID is an interdisciplinary public research institute focused on science on the University of Wisconsin–Madison campus in Madison, Wisconsin. The institute is located in the Discovery Building and opened in 2010 with five research themes, which have since evolved as collaborations crossed disciplinary boundaries and new research teams formed.

The privately funded institute is led by chief executive officer Brad Schwartz.

Both institutes are housed in the same facility, the ground floor of which serves as a "town center", providing several small and large meeting and collaboration areas and variety of dining options. This town center design is based on the philosophies presented in the Wisconsin Idea. Above the town center on the ground floor, the building has three floors of modular, non-traditional research and lab space, designed to promote collaboration amongst researchers. The building is also designed using green techniques, and is expected to use 50% less energy and water than the next most recent research building on the UW–Madison campus.

== Building Design Information ==
- Size: 330,000 square feet
- Cost: $213 million
- Architect, Design Architect, and Laboratory Planner: Ballinger, Philadelphia, PA
- Associate Architect/Interior Designer: Uihlein Wilson Architects, Milwaukee, WI
- MEP Engineer: Affiliated Engineers Inc., Madison, WI
- Landscape Architect: Olin Partnership, Philadelphia, PA
- Structural and Civil Engineer: Graef, Anhalt, Schloemer & Assoc. Inc., Madison, WI
- Construction Manager: J.H. Findorff & Sons Inc., Madison, WI, and M.A. Mortensen Co., Brookfield, WI
- Commissioning Engineer: Facility Dynamics Engineering, Columbia, MD and Champaign-Urbana, IL
- Stone Fabricator: Quarra Stone Company LLC, Madison WI

== Research ==
The faculty of the WID hold dual appointments at the institute and in departments across campus, including data science and visualization, tissue engineering and nanomedicine, -omics, health, agriculture, and complex systems. WID's approach to science involves calling on a broad community to identify and find solutions to big problems, encouraging interdisciplinary thought and action, and championing the Wisconsin Idea as a central tenet.

WID houses "Discovery Hubs" that are designed to be integrators for the campus community, generating new ideas that nucleate new collaborative projects. The hubs make use of WID expertise to provide services to other researchers in applying specialized tools to a range of problems extending beyond the scope of WID's programs. The hubs are the Data Science Hub, the Multi-Omics Hub, and the Illuminating Discovery Hub.

== Awards ==
- Awarded 2012 Laboratory of the Year by R&D Magazine http://www.rdmag.com/articles/2012/06/laboratory-all
- Received the 2012 Innovation in Green Building Award http://www.usgbc.org/articles/university-wisconsin-%E2%80%93-madison-receives-2012-innovation-green-building-award

== See also ==
- John Morgridge
- James Thomson (cell biologist)
- Patricia Flatley Brennan
