= Society for College and University Planning =

The Society for College and University Planning (SCUP) is a professional association for the integration of planning in higher education institutions. It is headquartered in Ann Arbor, Michigan, and has 5,200 members in 33 countries.
