= Shelley Penn =

Australian architect

Shelley Jane Penn AM (born 1965) is an Australian architect, educator, urbanist and built environment advocate based in Melbourne.

== Education ==
Penn was educated at Kilvington girls grammar and completed her architectural training at Melbourne University in 1988, graduating with honours. She is also a graduate of the Australian Institute of Company Directors (AICD) course.

== Professional career ==
=== Practice ===
In 1993, Penn established the firm Shelley Penn Architects as a hybrid practice initially specialising in residential design and shifting focus to include consultation to government and the private sector on public projects from 1999. Her work has been awarded and exhibited nationally and internationally.

=== Government ===
Penn has held several positions within state and federal government and in 2014 was recognised as a leading figure in Public Policy within the top 100 Women of Influence by the Australian Financial Review and Westpac Bank. In 2006, she became the first Associate Victorian Government Architect, and a member and then Chair of the National Capital Authority from 2009 to 2014 and the deputy chair of the Heritage Council of Victoria from 2008 to 2012. She has undertaken numerous consultancies as a strategic advisor and reviewer, including conducting major reviews for government including co-chairing the 2011 Barangaroo Review. She has served on multiple Victorian, South Australian and New South Wales local and state government Design Review Panels for projects of all scales.

=== Professional advocacy ===
Penn is an active member of the architecture industry's peak body, the Australian Institute of Architects, including having held numerous positions on local and national committees and task forces. After a two-year term as an elected member and Honorary Secretary of the Australian Institute of Architects National Council, in May 2012 Penn was elected as the council's 73rd National President. She was only the third woman elected to the role after Louise Cox in 1994 and Melinda Dodson in 2009. Her election as president was particularly notable given that only a small group of sole practitioners are elected to the volunteer role despite more than half of the institute's members identifying as sole practitioners. She is a Life Fellow of the institute.

In addition to advocacy through representation, Penn is an active contributor to professional discourse. She has been a panellist in numerous public debates, published in many leading professional journals, including Architecture Australia, Architecture and Design, Monument and Artichoke, and is a regular contributor for Parlour; an online forum for the advocacy of women and equity in architecture.

=== Educator ===
Penn is currently an adjunct professor in architectural practice at Monash University and associate professor in architecture at University of Melbourne's Melbourne School of Design. She has also taught, co-ordinated and guest-critiqued bachelor and master's students at Monash, RMIT, Deakin and Melbourne University, since her own graduation in 1988.

== Awards and recognition ==
In the 2021 Queen's Birthday Honours Penn was appointed a Member of the Order of Australia for "significant service to architecture and design in the public realm, and to professional institutes".

== Selected appointments ==
- 2019: Jury, Tasmania Chapter Awards, Australian Institute of Architects
- 2017— : Monash University Architect
- 2017— : Non-executive Director, Australian Centre for Contemporary Art
- 2017— : Panel Member, State Design Review Panel, NSW
- 2012— : Advisory Panel Member, Women's Property Initiative
- 2012—2016: Panel member, Capital City Design Review Panel, Adelaide
- 2016—2018: Council member, Melbourne High School
- 2012— : Panel Member, Victorian Design Review Panel
- 2014–2016: Council Member, Williamstown High School
- 2009–2014 Member then chair, National Capital Authority
- 2012–2014: Chair, Architecture Advisory Board, Faculty of Architecture, University of Melbourne
- 2012–2013: National President, Australian Institute of Architects
- 2013: Jury Chair, National Architecture Awards, Australian Institute of Architects
- 2011–2012: Board Member, Architecture Media
- 2008–2012: Deputy Chair, Heritage Council of Victoria
- 2009–2012: Board Member, Linking Melbourne Authority
- 2009–2012: Honorary Secretary, Australian Institute of Architects
- 2012: Chair of Juries, Victorian Chapter Awards, Australian Institute of Architects
- 2011: Jury Chair, ACT Chapter Awards, Australian Institute of Architects
- 2006–2010: Associate Victorian Government Architect, Office of the Victorian Government Architect
- 2010 Chair, Premier's Design Awards, State of Design Victoria
- 2006–2009: Board Member, Architects Registration Board of Victoria
- 2002–2004: Member, Victorian Design Advisory Council
- 2000–2001: Design Director, Office of the NSW Government Architect

== Work (built) ==
- Richmond Warehouse, Melbourne (Awarded the Residential Alterations and Extensions Award of Merit at the 2000 Royal Institute of Architects Victorian Awards)
- Fitzroy Terrace, Melbourne
- Institute of Postcolonial Studies, Melbourne
- Overcliffe House, Potts Point, in collaboration with Clinton Murray Architects (Awarded the Residential Architecture Award at the 2002 Royal Institute of Architects NSW Awards)
- Eastern Beach house, Port Fairy, in collaboration with Clinton Murray Architect (Finalist, Best Residential Design, 2008 Timber Design Awards)

== Work (public discourse) ==
- "Gender Salary Gap Not So Great", ArchitectureAU, 13 February 2013
- "Women in Architecture", ArchitectureAU, 3 July 2012
- "Fitzroy Community School Creative Space", Architecture Australia, (September 2011)
- "Habitat 21", Architecture Australia, (May 2011)
- "Housing in Victoria", Architecture Australia (March/April 2007)
- "Why architecture matters", Architecture Australia (January/February 2007)
- "Urban Parasite", Monument, (December 2002/January 2003)
