= 2007 Queen's Birthday Honours (Australia) =

The Queen's Birthday Honours 2007 for Australia.

== Order of Australia ==
=== Companion (AC) ===
==== General Division ====
Recipient	Citation
Norman Ross Adler	For service to business and commerce, particularly through the promotion of international trade and as a contributor to company and commercialisation development in Australia, to the community through administrative roles with educational institutions, and as a supporter of the arts.
Reverend Dr Peter Frederick Carnley	For service to religion as Primate of the Anglican Church of Australia, as a renowned theologian, and significant contributor to international inter-faith collaboration.
David Michael Gonski	For service to the arts through charitable support and the development of policy initiatives, to business and commerce as a company director, to education, and to the community through a range of philanthropic endeavours.
Justice Margaret Anne McMurdo	For service to the law and judicial administration in Queensland, particularly in the areas of legal education and women's issues, to the support of a range of legal organisations, and to the community.
Victor Smorgon	For service to the community as a benefactor and supporter of a wide range of organisations, particularly in the areas of art, education and medicine.

Ref:

==== Military Division ====
Branch	Recipient	Citation
Army	Lieutenant General Peter Leahy AO	For eminent service to the Australian Defence Force in command of the Australian Army and strategic staff appointments.

Ref:

=== Officer (AO) ===
==== General Division ====
Recipient	Citation
Gary Ronald Banks	For service to the community as an economist through the development of public policy, particularly in the area of microeconomic reform and regulation.
Dr John Barton Best	For service to medicine and to public health through support for strategic health research and policy development, and as a contributor to the development of rural and remote health services and medical education programs, particularly in Aboriginal and Torres Strait Island communities and regional Victoria.
Professor Judith Lee Black	For service to medicine, particularly as a researcher and teacher in the field of respiratory pharmacology, and through executive and other roles in research related organisations.
Mark Douglas Burrows	For service to the corporate sector in leading the development of nationally uniform corporate law and financial market regulation, and to the arts through contribution to theatre.
John Marcus Cassidy	For service to university administration, to the civil engineering and construction industries, and to the community.
Justice Alex Chernov QC	For service to the law through a range of judicial and administrative roles with Victorian, national and Asia-Pacific bodies, and to education through the University of Melbourne.
Professor Colin Nicholson Chesterman	For service to medicine and medical research, particularly in the fields of vascular biology, to education, and to the support of national and international professional organisations.
Ashley John Cooper	For service to tennis through a range of organisations that administer and promote the sport, and as a player, coach and mentor to junior players.
Sister Eileen Ann Daffy	For service to education through leadership and development roles in Catholic secondary schools in Australia and Pakistan, and to the community through Caritas Pakistan.
Emeritus Professor Peter LePoer Darvall	For service to education, as Vice-Chancellor of Monash University and as an engineering academic and researcher.
Professor Kenneth John Donald	For service to medicine as an academic and administrator, particularly as a contributor in the fields of pathology and community health.
Sister Regis Mary Dunne	For service to medicine, particularly through promotion and support of bioethics in medical research, and as a researcher in the field of genetics.
George Rex Edmondson	For service to conservation and the environment, particularly through natural resource management organisations and the Landcare movement, and to local government.
Dr Brian Stanley Fisher	For service to agricultural economics, international trade and climate change through research and public policy analysis.
Ian Charles Harris	For service to the Parliament of Australia, particularly through the administration of the House of Representatives and its committees, to promotion of parliamentary practice and procedure, and to assisting the understanding of the functions of parliament internationally.
Ivan David James	For service to the manufacturing industry, particularly the automotive component sector and through the Australian Industry Group, and to the community through church and overseas aid organisations.
Professor Anne Kelso	For service to science, particularly in the field of immunology and vaccine research through contributions to a range of scientific organisations, and as an academic and mentor.
Professor Iain Duncan McCalman	For service to history and to the humanities as a teacher, researcher and author, and through administrative, advocacy and advisory roles in academic and public sector organisations.
Professor Colin Patrick McKerras	For service to Asian studies and international relations, particularly in the field of Chinese society, culture and language.
Neil Mitchell	For service to the print, radio and television media, and to the community through a range of charitable institutions.
Allan James Myers QC	For service to the community through support and sponsorship of a range of educational, Indigenous, heritage and art organisations, to the law, and to business.
Maria Josephine Myers	For service as a philanthropist supporting and endowing a range of charitable, Indigenous, heritage and art organisations.
Mark Ian Paterson	For service to business and industry through policy development and economic research, to the resources sector in the areas of energy regulation and marketing, and to tourism development.
William Francis Robinson	For service as one of Australia's most distinguished landscape artists, for support and philanthropy to Australian art, and for the encouragement and education of young and emerging artists.
Emeritus Professor Jillian Isobel Roe	For service to the community through the promotion of Australian history as a researcher and author, through executive roles in professional organisations particularly as chair, editorial board, Australian Dictionary of Biography, and to education.
Justice Geza Kim Santow	For service to the judiciary and to the law; to education, particularly in the area of university governance; and to the arts.
Dr Beth Schultz	For service to conservation and the environment in Western Australia, particularly through the protection of the South West old growth forests.
Donald Malcolm Talbot	For service to swimming, particularly through the development and implementation of innovative coaching programs.
Michael John Taylor	For service to the management of natural resources and industry policy development at the Federal level and also in Victoria, particularly in the area of agriculture, and through contributions to transport, water, food and safety standards.
Dennis John Trewin	For service to statistics as the Australian Statistician, particularly through the reform of reporting standards and practices and support for a range of national and international professional organisations, and to the community.
Alan Brian Whelpton	For service to the community, particularly through the promotion of surf lifesaving at state, national and international levels, and as an administrator in a range of roles related to sport.
Roger Bruce Wilkins	For service to public administration in New South Wales, particularly as a contributor to a range of new policy initiatives, and to arts administration.
Warwick James Wilkinson	For service to the professional and business communities, particularly as a contributor to a range of regulatory and competition policy organisations, and to the pharmacy profession and the pharmaceutical industry.

==== Military Division ====
Branch	Recipient	Citation
Army	Major General John Patrick Cantwell	For distinguished service as the Director of Strategic Operations for the Multi-National Force – Iraq.
Army	Major General Mark Evans	For distinguished service to the Australian Defence Force in senior command and staff appointments.
Air Force	Air Vice-Marshal John Nicholas Blackburn	For distinguished service to the Royal Australian Air Force as Commander of the Integrated Area Defence System and Deputy Chief of Air Force.

=== Member (AM) ===
==== General Division ====
Recipient	Citation
Councillor Barbara Helen Abley	For service to local government and regional development, particularly through the Geelong Region Alliance, and to the community through a range of aged care, disability, health and service organisations.
Professor Robert John Adams	For service to urban design, town planning and architecture through the implementation of programs, projects and policies that have transformed the City of Melbourne.
Robert James Aitken	For service to the community through a range of roles with Rotary and to sporting organisations in coaching and administrative roles.
Sauro Antonelli	For service to the community through a range of roles with Rotary and to sporting organisations in coaching and administrative roles.
Terrey Philip Arcus	For service to the community through advisory roles with major cultural organisations and philanthropic support for health, education and art organisations.
Gaynor Marjorie Austen	For service to library and information management, particularly through the integration and management of new and evolving resources available in university libraries, and executive roles with a range of professional associations.
Kareena Eileen Ballard	For service to workforce training and development in the construction and property services sector, to the real estate profession, and to the community.
Clyde Ian Barclay	For service to the building and construction industry through the improvement of training programs for apprentices and trainees in the industry in Queensland, and through executive roles with a range of organisations.
Professor Bryanne Waldie Barnett	For service to psychiatry and to the community through research and the development of intervention programs and services in the areas of infant, child, adolescent and maternal mental health and well-being, and to professional organisations.
Professor Sydney Malcolm Bell	For service to medicine, particularly through the development and maintenance of public sector pathology services and the provision of expert advice to a range of health organisations, and to medical research and education.
Raelene Ann Boyle	For service to the community through a range of roles with organisations that support people with cancer, particularly Breast Cancer Network Australia.
Dr Kerry John Breen	For service to medicine through the advancement of medical ethics and professional standards of training and practice and to the speciality of gastroenterology as a clinician and teacher.
The Honourable Robert James (Bob) Brown	For service to the Australian Parliament, particularly in the area of transport policy, to the community of the Hunter Region through local government, heritage and sporting organisations, and to economics education.
Ruth Elizabeth Bunyan	For service to education through the Invergowrie Foundation, the Council of International Schools, and as Principal of Strathcona Baptist Girls Grammar School.
Ross Murdoch Bunyon	For service to commerce and industry in New South Wales through the management and reform of government business enterprises, and to the community through the Christian Brethren Church.
Dr James Michael Butler	For service to medicine in the field of dermatology, particularly through the establishment of the Skin and Cancer Foundation, and to the Australasian College of Dermatologists.
Mary Cameron	For service to the legal profession and to the community through significant contributions to the early development of family law, women's legal rights and the role of women in the law.
Philip Marcus Clark	For service to the legal profession and business, particularly through the development of national law firms and encouraging corporate involvement in community programs.
The Honourable Barry Cohen	For service to the Australian Parliament and to the community through a range of cultural and environmental roles and contributions to public discussion and debate.
Roger Anthony Cook	For service to business in the areas of property consultancy and development and to the community of South Australia through contributions to a range of infrastructure, tourism and sporting organisations.
Professor George Henry Cooney	For service to secondary education, particularly through contributions to scholarship, research and policy development in the areas of curriculum, educational testing, and standards based assessment.
Gregory Rolph Copley	For service to the international community through strategic research and analysis of economic, social, political, security and environmental conditions to assist decision making agencies.
John Francis Corboy	For service to the agricultural sector, particularly the fruit growing and processing industries, and to the community of the Goulburn Valley.
Professor Anthony Douglas (Tony) Cousins	For service to literary studies as an academic, author and international specialist in the field of early modern British literature.
Marilyn Kay Craddock	For service to the antiquarian book trade, to professional associations and promotion of the industry in Australia and internationally, and to small business through contributions to the advancement of the City of Melbourne.
Perry Rothrock Crosswhite	For service to sport, particularly through executive roles with the Commonwealth and Olympic Games organisations, and to basketball as a competitor at national and international levels.
James Anderson Darling	For service to conservation and the environment, particularly through the development of sustainable land management practices, to the arts, and to the community of Keith.
Anthony William Darvall	For service to the legal profession, to sustainable urban and transport infrastructure development in Victoria, and to the community.
Professor Paul Charles Davies	For service to science, particularly the disciplines of physics, cosmology and astrobiology, as an educator, author and public commentator.
Professor Patrick de Deckker	For service to science through research and teaching in the areas of palaeoclimate studies, salination and climate change, and through the initiation and support of international scientific collaboration.
Arthur Edwin Delbridge	For service to business and commerce, particularly in the areas of public relations and annual reporting, and to the community through charitable organisations.
Ibrahim Hussein Dellal	For service to the Islamic and Turkish communities, particularly through the establishment of educational facilities and settlement programs for migrants, and to the promotion of interfaith dialogue.
Ian William Donaldson	For service to the community through the development of leukaemia support foundations, to philanthropic and church organisations, and to business and commerce.
Dr Christina Margaret Drummond	For service to public health in the field of communicable disease control, particularly through international humanitarian aid programs.
Dr David Geoffrey Dufty	For service to education, particularly through contributions to social and cultural education curriculum development and implementation in New South Wales schools, and to the community of the Bouddi Peninsula area.
Distinguished Professor Dexter Colboyd Dunphy	For service to education, particularly in the fields of organisational change, corporate sustainability and business management, and to the community.
Peter Douglas Eastwood	For service to accountancy through roles with private and public sector agencies, and to the community of Perth through educational and research organisations.
Margaret Ursula Eldridge	For service to the community through organisations that provide assistance to international students, migrants and refugees, and to the promotion of multiculturalism and cultural awareness.
Dr Evan Richard Everest	For service to the community through leadership and dedication in improving helicopter rescue services in South Australia, and to medicine, particularly in the area of critical care.
Dr Ralph Anthony (Tony) Fischer	For service to agricultural science in Australia and developing countries, particularly wheat research in the areas of grain yield and crop cultivation and management.
Professor Richard Hamilton Fisher	For service to the legal profession, to law reform in relation to insolvency and the protection of creditor rights, and to the community.
Gweneth Edith (Gwen) Fletcher	For service to the development of the financial planning industry through the establishment of national organisations and training and educational programs, and as a mentor to women in the finance industry.
Graeme Leslie Fordham	For service to youth, particularly through leadership roles in the development of the Scouting movement in New South Wales.
Professor Richard Mark Fox	For service to medicine in the areas of clinical oncology and research, to medical education and training, and through governance and leadership roles within professional organisations.
Michael John Frankel	For service to the law, particularly in the areas of cultural and intellectual property rights, to film and performing arts organisations, and to a range of media industry associations.
Professor Robert David Fraser	For service to medicine, particularly in the area of spinal surgery as a clinician, to medical education and research, and through contributions to a range of professional organisations.
Arthur John Garland	For service to the real estate industry through a range of executive roles with professional organisations, to the development of international relationships with property sector representatives, and to the community of Perth.
Professor Gina Malke Geffen	For service in the field of neuropsychology as a researcher and educator, to the development of professional standards in psychology teaching and practice, and as an advocate for people with a brain injury.
Professor Graeme Allan George	For service to science, particularly as a researcher in the area of polymer chemistry, through contributions to the development of new applications for biomedical and degradable plastics, and to the administration and promotion of science education.
Richard William Gibb	For service to people with an intellectual disability, particularly through executive roles with the Inala school; to the accountancy profession; and to education and youth organisations.
Libby Gleeson	For service to literature as an author and as an advocate for the development of literacy and learning in schools, as a mentor to young writers, and through a range of executive roles with professional literary organisations.
Dr Dawn Theresa Goodwin	For service to education, particularly through contributions to tertiary, adult and community education, to the professional development of people working with youth, and to the Catholic Church in Australia.
John Wilson Gourlay	For service to the community as a philanthropist supporting charitable organisations, educational institutions and business ethics programs, and to the accountancy profession.
Maurice Green	For service to the community through fundraising and executive roles to support the rehabilitation programs of the Odyssey House McGrath Foundation.
Richard John Grellman	For service to the community, particularly through leadership roles with Mission Australia and fundraising with Variety, The Children's Charity, and to the finance and insurance sectors.
Associate Professor John Andrew Gullotta	For service to medicine through a range of executive roles with professional medical associations and as a general practitioner, and to the Italian community.
Charlie Gunabarra	For service to the Indigenous population of north central Arnhem land through the development and provision of culturally sensitive health services, particularly for men's health.
Jack Henry Harty	For service to the community through support for a range of health organisations, particularly the Mental Health Foundation of Australia, and to the legal profession.
Gerald (Gerry) Hatton	For service to business and commerce through the development, introduction and adoption of new technologies in the logistics and materials handling sector, and to industry training.
Naida Jean Haxton (Mrs Boddam-Whetham)	For service to the legal profession and to the judiciary, particularly as the Editor of the New South Wales Law Reports and as a practitioner and educator.
Anthony George Hodgson	For service to business, particularly through a range of executive roles in the finance sector, to the promotion and development of Rugby Union football, and to the horseracing industry.
Toni Ellen Hoffman	For service to nursing and to the community through concern for the well-being of patients in the public health care system, and advocacy roles to improve standards of medical care.
Belinda Jane Hutchinson	For service to business through a range of executive roles in the finance sector, and to the development of financial planning and fundraising initiatives for cultural, medical and social welfare organisations.
Robert William (Hank) Jenkins	For service to wildlife conservation and management, particularly through contributions to the development of policies for sustainable international trade in wild fauna.
Professor Naguib Kanawati	For service to education through archaeological research and the promotion and advancement of the study of Egyptology, and to the community.
Maxwell James (Max) Kimber	For service to engineering, through infrastructure and commercial development of the natural gas pipeline industry, and national and international contributions to technical and economic regulatory standards.
Malcolm Leslie Lamb	For service to education through executive roles with professional associations, the promotion of effective leadership in schools, and to the study of Asian languages.
Associate Professor Peter James Little	For service to people with diabetes, particularly through executive roles with Diabetes Australia, and to research into the vascular effects, treatment and prevention of the disease.
Adjunct Professor John Frederick McAuliffe	For service to the community particularly through executive roles in the areas of health care and public housing management, and to the property valuation industry.
Lawrence McCredie	For service to legal education, particularly in the areas of tertiary administration and teaching, and to the community through advocacy roles for people living with a disability.
Bruce John McDonald	For service to the Liberal Party of Australia, to the New South Wales Parliament, and to the transport industry.
William Raymond McIntosh	For service to conservation and the environment, particularly through the advancement of natural resource management practices and conservation initiatives, and to remote area communities in South Australia.
Associate Professor Stephen Edward McIntyre	For service to music as a concert pianist, teacher and supporter of young musicians, and through administrative roles with national and international music festivals and competitions.
Ian Melville McMaster	For service to the sugar and steel industries through a range of executive roles, to the development of capital investment initiatives, research and industry reform, and to the advancement of community, government and industry partnerships.
Sister Ailsa Mary MacKinnon	For service to the community through leadership roles in the Catholic education sector, to industrial and employment relations, and to the Congregation of the Sisters of Mercy, Parramatta.
Duncan Moir Malcolm	For service to conservation and the environment through executive roles with a range of natural resource management organisations, and to the community of East Gippsland.
Dr Anthony Francis Mariani	For service to medicine as a consultant physician in the fields of gastroenterology and internal medicine and through the development and promotion of preventive health care initiatives within the Italian community in Australia.
Reverend Barry Neil Martin	For service to the community through contributions to the social welfare services of the Anglican Church, to young people at risk, to pastoral care and the promotion of ecumenism.
Hellen Lesly Matthews	For service to the Indigenous communities of north central Arnhem land through the delivery of culturally sensitive primary and acute health care services, particularly for women and children.
David Arthur Miles	For service to the community through support for Australian innovation and research, to public policy development in the areas of trade, taxation and international relations, and to the legal profession.
Stephen Brian Millar	For service to the wine industry through a range of executive roles, to the advancement of the wine export market, professional development and industry reform, and to support for wetlands conservation.
Professor Anthony Crothers Milner	For service to education in the field of Asian studies as an academic and author, and to international relations through the development of cross-cultural education and outreach activities.
Dr Mark Harold Moore	For service to medicine in the field of plastic, reconstructive and rehabilitation surgery, particularly through the provision of humanitarian specialist surgical services in East Timor and Indonesia, and to professional development and education.
Dr Keith Gordon Neill	For service to chemical science research, particularly through the development of innovative manufacturing applications in a range of areas, to professional development and to technical education.
Laurence Frederick O'Meara	For service to the tourism and hospitality industries, particularly through the development and promotion of industry standards and accreditation, and export opportunities for Western Australia, and to the community through arts and heritage organisations.
Graeme Alston Park OAM	For service to youth, particularly through leadership roles in the development of the scouting movement in Victoria.
Susan Mary Pascoe	For service to education through a range of executive roles, particularly in the Catholic education sector, to curriculum policy development, to international relations through initiatives to provide opportunities and resources for educators in the Pacific region, and to the community.
Annabelle Nicole Pegrum	For service to the planning, promotion, enhancement and development of Australia's national capital, and to architecture, particularly as a mentor to women in the profession.
Thomas Robin Phillips	For service to business through the automotive industry, and to the community.
Ronald George Pitcher	For service to business and commerce, particularly in the field of accountancy, and to the community through support for charitable organisations.
Allan George Pizzey	For service to business and commerce, particularly in the field of accountancy, and to the community through support for charitable organisations.
Hugh Henry Ralston	For service to engineering, particularly as a contributor to the advancement of innovative technology, to The Warren Centre for Advanced Engineering, and to the community.
Robert George (Rob) Ramjan	For service to the community in the area of mental health, and to the Schizophrenia Fellowship of New South Wales.
Thora Marie Regan	For service to women, particularly through the Catholic Women's League Australia, and to the community of Boorowa.
Timothy James Reid	For service to the Australian apple and cherry industries as a grower and exporter, particularly through international market development.
Peter Ronald Richardson	For service to the community in the area of employment through contributions to job network services and policies and to Mission Australia.
Reginald John Richardson	For service to the visual arts as a supporter, patron and collector, and to the community through a range of social welfare and medical research organisations.
Emeritus Professor Peter James Rimmer	For service to economic geography, and to urban and regional development in the Asia-Pacific Rim, particularly through research in the area of transport and communications systems.
Dr David Barry Rosenwax	For service to dentistry, particularly through the Australian Society of Implant Dentistry, and to the community.
Alastair Montgomery Ross	For service to forensic science, particularly as a contributor to the establishment and development of standards in the areas of quality, research, education and training.
Dr Leanne Rowe	For service to medicine, particularly in the field of adolescent and Indigenous health, and through executive positions with a range of professional health organisations.
Colin McDougall (Mac) Russell	For service to the electrical contracting sector as a contributor to its development and as a mentor and promoter of training programs.
Dr Ronald Lindsay Sandland	For service to science and technology, particularly in the area of research management and through contributions to the Commonwealth Scientific and Industrial Research Organisation.
Professor Graham Patrick Seal	For service to the preservation and dissemination of Australian folklore, particularly through a range of academic, editorial and research roles.
Moira Edna Shannon OAM	For service to the community through a range of organisations providing services to women, children and people with disabilities.
Dr Ruth Shatford	For service to education, particularly as Principal of Tara Anglican School for Girls and through participation in professional educational organisations.
Dr Albert Shun	For service to medicine as a paediatric surgeon, particularly in the areas of renal and liver transplantation.
Gemma Sisia	For service to the international community through the establishment and development of The School of St Jude in Arusha, Tanzania.
Dr Kevin H Siu	For service to medicine as a neurosurgeon and through contributions to a range of professional associations.
George Charles Smith	For service to politics, particularly through the Legislative Assembly of Norfolk Island, and to the community through organisations involved in youth welfare and broadcasting.
Professor Bruce Arthur Stone	For service to science, particularly in the field of biochemistry as a researcher, academic and administrator.
Josephine Gabriella Stone	For service to the community of the Northern Territory, and to the law.
Dr Jennifer Strauss	For service to education as an academic and scholar in the field of Australian literature and poetry, and to a range of organisations involved in women's issues and industrial relations.
Graham Ralph Thompson	For service to the community of Adelaide, particularly through Crime Stoppers and the Noarlunga Farm Project for at risk youth.
William Richard (Billy) Thorpe	For service to the entertainment industry as a musician, songwriter, producer, and as a contributor to the preservation and collection of contemporary Australian music.
Professor Geoffrey William Tregear	For service to scientific and medical research and through administrative roles within research institutions.
Fraser James Vickery	For service to conservation and the environment, to the development and promotion of ecotourism in South Australia, and to the Indigenous community.
Nicholas John Vine Hall	For service to the community in the area of genealogy as a researcher, author and radio presenter, and through roles in family history organisations.
Yvonne Vera von Hartel	For service to architecture, design and building through involvement with a range of professional organisations, to the promotion of women in business, and to the community.
Professor Arthur Peter Vulcan	For service to the community as a contributor to accident and injury prevention in the field of road transport, and to people with intellectual disabilities.
Associate Professor Terry Richard Walton	For service to dentistry, particularly in the field of prosthodontics as a clinician and educator, and to a range of professional associations.
Kenneth Hammond Warriner	For service to the beef cattle industry, particularly in the areas of breeding, export and meat processing, and to rural project management.
Janet Barbara West	For service to the accountancy profession through the Institute of Chartered Accountants in Australia, and to the community.
John Macarthur Wharton	For service to the community of north west Queensland through local government, regional development, natural resource management and primary industry organisations.
Professor Leslie White	For service to medicine in the field of paediatrics, to medical administration, and to the community through a range of organisations involved in child and adolescent cancer support.
Dr Gregory Neville Whitmore	For service to educational administration, particularly at the James Cook University, and to the community of Mackay through a range of service organisations.
Emeritus Professor David William Williams	For service to the arts as an educator and administrator.
John M R Wylie	For service to the investment banking and financial services industry, and to the community through sporting and medical organisations.

==== Military Division ====
Branch	Recipient	Citation	Notes
Navy	Rear Admiral Russell Harry Crane CSM	For exceptional service to the Royal Australian Navy as Commander Australian Navy Systems Command, Director-General Coastwatch/Commander Joint Offshore Protection Command and Deputy Chief of Navy.	
Army	Brigadier Andrew Brian Dudgeon	For exceptional service as the Deputy Director Army Aviation in Aerospace Combat Development Division, Team Leader of the Armed Reconnaissance Helicopter Resident Project Team – France and Deputy Commander of 16th Brigade (Aviation).	
Army	Colonel Brett Andrew Greenland	For exceptional service as the Deputy Director Army Aviation, VCDF Group and Commanding Officer of the 5th Aviation Regiment.	
Army	Brigadier Geoffrey William Hand RFD	For exceptional service as Commander 13th Brigade and Director Army Personnel Agency – Perth.	
Army	Brigadier Michael Christopher Kehoe	For exceptional service as Commander 17th Combat Service Support Brigade, the Director Personnel – Army and Commanding Officer of 10th Force Support Battalion.	
Army	Brigadier Michael John Moon DSC	For exceptional service as the Commander Joint Task Force 633 on Operations Catalyst and Slipper.	
Army	Colonel David Thomas Mulhall	For exceptional service to the Australian Defence Force as inaugural Chief Instructor, Australian Command and Staff College; Commanding Officer of the 1st Combat Service Support Battalion, Career Adviser and Director at the Directorate of Officer Career Management – Army and as Director of Personnel Operations – Army	
Army	Brigadier Andrew John Sims CSC	For exceptional service to the Australian Army in command appointments, particularly as Commander Joint Task Force 632 on Operation Pakistan Assist.	
Army	Brigadier Michael David Slater DSC, CSC	For exceptional service as the Commander Joint Task Force 630 on Operation Larry Assist and as the Commander Joint Task Force 631 on Operation Astute.	
Army	Lieutenant Colonel Glenn David Stockton	For exceptional service as the Staff Officer Grade One Joint Plans – Land, Strategic Operations Division and as Commanding Officer of the 3rd Combat Engineer Regiment.	
Air Force	Group Captain Gregor Kirkham Bruce	For exceptional service to the Royal Australian Air Force Specialist Reserve.	
Air Force	Air Commodore Dennis Graham Green	For exceptional service to the Australian Defence Force and Royal Australian Air Force as the Commandant of the Australian Defence Force Warfare Centre and Director General Strategy and Planning – Air Force.	
Air Force	Chaplain Peter John O'Keefe	For exceptional service to the Royal Australian Air Force as a Chaplain.	
Air Force	Air Commodore Ian Phillip Smith	For exceptional performance of duties as a senior Air Force Logistics Officer and contributions to the strategic development of Australian Defence Force Logistics.	

=== Medal (OAM) ===
==== General Division ====
Recipient	Citation	Notes
Eddy Marcel Abraham	For service to the community through migrant assistance, multicultural media programs, and activities supporting senior citizens.	
Ronald Ryder Allen	For service to the welfare of veterans and their families, and to the international community through support for humanitarian aid programs.	
Andrew Alwast	For service to the Polish community through a range of organisations, and to multiculturalism.	
Simon Ernest Appel	For service to pharmacy through a range of professional organisations, and to the community.	
John Robert Archer	For service to lawn bowls as a competitor and through executive roles.	
John Lindsay Armitage	For service to the Australian Parliament, to the Australian Labor Party, and to the community.	
Alison Laura Armstrong	For service to the community, particularly through organisations supporting war widows, veterans and their families.	
Valerie Armstrong	For service to the community, particularly through the Cann River Pony Club and in the areas of religious education and support to children and youth.	
John Joseph Arndold deceased	For service to the development of the coal industry, particularly through research and education activities, and to the community.	
Guy Templeton Baker	For service to the welfare of veterans and their families.	
Robert Arthur (Bob) Baker	For service to youth through the Scouting movement, and to the sport of karting.	
Arthur Charles Bale	For service to the community of Tweed Heads, particularly through church and aged care organisations.	
Peter Edward Barclay	For service to the community through support for a range of charitable organisations, and to business.	
Dr Shelley Barker	For service to entomology through research and identification of new beetle species, as an author, and to science education.	
Reginald Jack Barrett	For service to the community of Coonamble through a range of rural, school and church bodies.	
Francis John Bartlett	For service to the community of Beaudesert, particularly through a range of civic and welfare organisations.	
Professor Michael Bernard Barton	For service to medicine, particularly radiation oncology, through a range of clinical, research, education and professional development roles.	
Annie Muriel Barwell	For service to children's literature as a member of the Western Australian Branch of the Children's Book Council of Australia.	
Lois Mary Beard	For service to the community of Brighton, particularly elderly people, and through support for charitable organisations.	
Ivor Euston Beatty	For service to conservation and the environment as a publisher of scientific material, and to the community through Cystic Fibrosis New South Wales.	
Michael John Beavis	For service to the welfare of veterans and their families, particularly through the Ocean Grove Sub-Branch of the Returned and Services League of Australia.	
Kenneth Leo Bedggood	For service to the welfare of veterans and their families, and to the community of Tarcutta.	
Stanley George Bennett	For service to athletics in Queensland through the development of young athletes and as an official and administrator.	
Terrence Joseph Blake	For service to polocrosse through a range of administrative roles and as a coach and umpire.	
Dr Robert William Boden	For service to horticulture, particularly through contributions to the development of the Australian National Botanic Gardens, and to the preservation of the natural environment.	
Dr John Michael Bounds	For service to medicine as a general practitioner, to professional and health care organisations, and to the community.	
Dianne Betty Bradley	For service to the community through the Anglican Church of Australia.	
Jean Boreham Bradley	For service to the community, particularly through the Queensland Branch of the Country Women's Association of Australia.	
Wayne Anthony Bradley	For service to cricket through a range of administrative roles, and to the community of Deniliquin as a contributor to the development of junior sport.	
Nancy Dora Bransden	For service to the community of Burnie, particularly through the Guides movement and aged care organisations.	
Helen Ivy Brayne	For service to the community of Griffith and the Riverina through a range of local government, civic, tourism and library organisations.	
Clive Desmond Brickhill	For service to veterans through a range of roles with the Returned and Services League of Australia, and to the community.	
Peter Brokensha	For service to arts administration, particularly through the establishment of the Argyle Arts Centre, to programs supporting Indigenous arts and crafts people, and to the community.	
Peggy Nampijimpa Brown	For service to the community of Yuendumu and the surrounding region of the Northern Territory through programs addressing substance abuse among Indigenous youth.	
Ralph Richard Bryant	For service to the community through the Rotary Club of Toukley and the Central Coast Festival of the Arts.	
Mary Josephine Budwee	For service to the community through the Catholic Church of Australia, particularly fundraising activities for educational and other facilities.	
Joachim (Achim) Burmeister	For service to Australian-German relations through the promotion of social, cultural and business opportunities, particularly in Western Australia.	
Peter Gerrard Burrows	For service to veterans, the Scottish community of the Australian Capital Territory, and to a range of sporting and youth organisations.	
John Charles Burt	For service to education, particularly through the Ballarat Specialist School, and to the community through a range of sporting and service organisations.	
Harold Keith (Joe) Byrne	For service to veterans and their families, particularly through the Ramsgate Sub-Branch of the Returned and Services League of Australia.	
Ronald James Calman	For service to the community through the Royal Volunteer Coastal Patrol.	
Bruce Gordon Campbell	For service to sailing through a range of yachting organisations, to the preservation of military history, and to the real estate industry.	
Peter Matthew Campbell	For service to the community through support for a range of civic, cultural, horticultural, youth and senior citizen organisations, and to the real estate industry.	
Alison Raie Carlson	For service to education through the University of the Third Age, and to the community.	
Professor Allan Carmichael	For service to medicine as an educator and administrator through a range of government and professional organisations, particularly in the field of paediatrics.	
Thomas McLeod Carmichael	For service to the community of the Yarrawonga district through a range of church, local government, emergency service, educational, and sporting organisations.	
Thomas Joseph Case	For service to the community through a range of health, local government, education, charitable and sporting organisations.	
Helen Mary Cannon	For service to the community, particularly through choral and musical activities within the Anglican Church.	
Jack Bearne Chapman	For service to the community through a range of church and service organisations, particularly in the field of choral performance, and to the optical lens manufacturing industry.	
Dr Alan Bruce Chater	For service to rural and remote medicine through a range of professional and allied organisations, and within the community of Theodore.	
Maxwell Gerry Cherry	For service to athletics as a coach and mentor at local, state and national levels.	
Lieutenant Colonel Thomas Edward Childs retired	For service to the preservation of the history of the Australian Light Horse, and to the ex-service community.	
Donald Lyston Chisholm	For service to the community as a legal practitioner, and to people with disabilities through the provision of employment and educational opportunities.	
Edward Albert Chitham MC	For service to veterans and their families through a range of ex-service and health care organisations.	
Winifred Pearl Christison	For service to the community, particularly through a range of aged care and church organisations.	
Emily Jeanette Clifton	For service to rural health, particularly through cancer support and health care organisations, and to the community.	
Shirley Moore Clifton	For service to the community of Coonabarabran, particularly to youth through the Guiding movement and to the development of local equestrian sports.	
John Alexander Clough	For service to the community of Wagga Wagga, particularly through Rotary International and the World Probus movement.	
Rino Codognotto	For service to the community as a restaurateur.	
Dr James Ronald (Ron) Court	For service to people with disabilities, particularly through Technical Aid to the Disabled, and to the La Trobe Valley Yacht Club.	
Kerry Cousins	For service to palliative care nursing as a leader in clinical assessment, knowledge and research, and in teaching and mentoring roles.	
Phillip Gilbert Cousins	For service to the community of the Hunter region through a range of first aid, rescue and sporting organisations and the surf lifesaving movement.	
Judith Ann Cowan	For service to people with a hearing disability, particularly through contributions to speech therapy programs, and to the community.	
Keith Malcolm Cox	For service to nursing, particularly in the field of oncology, and to the community through a range of youth, church and welfare organisations.	
Stewart Edward Cox	For service to the community of the Northern Territory through a range of sporting and civic organisations, and to the insurance industry.	
Dr Barbara Elizabeth Craig	For service to medicine in the areas of palliative care, women's health and medical ethics; and to the community.	
Doris Crerar	For service to the Australian ginger processing industry through managerial and administrative roles and executive positions with industry bodies, and to the communities of Buderim and Maroochydore.	
Barrie John Crichton	For service to the surf lifesaving movement through a range of executive roles at state, regional and club levels, and as a competitor and coach.	
The Very Reverend Archpriest Dr Brian Lawrence Cross	For service to religious education, particularly through the Australian Catholic University, to the promotion of ecumenism and interfaith dialogue, and to the community.	
Arthur John Cummins	For service to veterans, particularly through the Returned and Services League of Australia.	
Allen John Cunneen	For service to the community through disaster recovery coordination and management, particularly public infrastructure, following Tropical Cyclone Larry in 2006.	
Kim Maxwell Dalton	For service to the film and television industry as a leader in policy debate amongst government agencies and the industry, as a mentor of independent and Indigenous producers, and as a promoter of emerging visual technology.	
Dr Michael Patrick Daly	For service to medicine, particularly to veterans in the fields of counselling and stress related illness.	
Michael William Dann	For service to veterans, particularly through the Aircrew Association, and to the community.	
Marjorie Ann Davis	For service to the development of the aviation industry through a range of executive and administrative roles, particularly with aero clubs.	
Peter Leonard Dealy	For service to the community, particularly through roles with a range of ex-service, youth and agricultural organisations.	
Ronald Joseph Dean	For service to Rugby League football in the Manly Warringah district.	
Norman Harold Deane	For service to sailing as a competitor, coach and in administrative roles, and to the community through a range of charitable, service and church groups.	
Vincent John de Lorenzo deceased	For service to the hairdressing industry through business and educational activities, and for research and development of hair care products.	
Graham James Dempsey	For service to the community, particularly through the Royal Victorian Association of Honorary Justices, the Australian Red Cross Blood Service and Rotary International.	
John Henry Dening ED	For service to the welfare of veterans and their families through a range of roles with ex-service organisations.	
Professor Sergio de Pieri	For service to the arts as an organ teacher, composer and performer, and to the community through the establishment of music festivals.	
Harold Lancelot de Sayrah	For service to the community through Lions Australia and as a supporter of humanitarian aid projects in Sri Lanka.	
Jacqui Douglas	For service to the community of the Western Sydney region through a range of roles with cultural, Indigenous and welfare groups.	
Margaret Isobel Douglas	For service to the community through the provision of support services to the aged.	
Thomas Adrian Dumaresq	For service to the community as a supporter of humanitarian aid projects, and through a range of roles with environmental, church, education and emergency services groups.	
The Honourable Bernard Phillip Dunn	For service to the Victorian Parliament, local government, the agriculture sector and the community of Horsham.	
Margaret Eve Dutton	For service to local government, and to the community through a range of aged care, charitable, educational and service groups.	
Peter Stanley Dwyer	For service to optometry through executive roles in professional organisations, the establishment of a nationally consistent competency-based approach to the registration of practitioners and as a researcher in the field of paediatrics.	
Susan Dyer	For service to the performing arts, particularly the development of amateur musical theatre through executive, administrative and acting roles.	
Maureen Palmer Eddy	For service to the community of Marulan and district through local government and a range of service, arts and charitable organisations.	
Elisabeth Mary Edgar	For service to the communities of Harrow and Edenhope through health, tourism and sporting organisations.	
Helen Mary Edwards	For service to the community of Barwon Heads, particularly through the Anglican Church of Australia, and to education.	
Thomas George Eiszele	For service to the community through providing assistance to refugees settling in the Hobart area.	
Avril Robin Everingham	For service to arts administration, particularly as a fundraiser and event organiser for musical and operatic groups.	
Jill Faddy	For service to psychology, particularly through the provision of mental health services in New South Wales, and as a contributor to a range of professional and community organisations.	
Cecile Frances Falvey	For service to the promotion and development of the textile sector through a range of professional associations and as an educator, particularly in the field of weaving.	
Bruce Gordon Fell-Smith	For service to humanitarian aid through the establishment of the Talpe Rehabilitation and Development Trust in Sri Lanka.	
Roy Joseph (Tem) Fish	For service to the community of Oatlands, particularly through local government and health organisations, and to the horseracing and gaming industries.	
Elizabeth Mary Fisher	For service to the community of the Forster region through palliative care and service organisations.	
Kevin Dominic Fisher	For service to veterans through the South Australian Division of the Royal Australian Air Force Association, and to youth development.	
Sister Mary Michael Fitzgerald	For service to education as a music teacher, particularly piano, violin and singing, and to the community of Parkes and the surrounding region.	
Margaret Flint	For service to the Anglican Church of Australia in a range of committee roles, and to the community through women's organisations.	
James Raymond Forsyth	For service to the dairy industry, particularly as a facilitator of structural change and through a range of professional organisations.	
Everett Charles Foster	For service to the conservation of Australian native orchids, and to the community of the Geelong region through heritage, church and sporting organisations	
Michael Stewart Fozard	For service to the community of the Baw Baw Shire through a range of service, youth, local government, civic, environmental, tourism and sporting organisations.	
Dr John Gavan Fraser	For service to tennis at state, national and international levels through administrative roles, and to sports medicine.	
Dr Howard Alan Freeman	For service to the Jewish community, particularly through the preservation of historical documents.	
Robert Wemyss Frewin	For service to the real estate industry, particularly through executive roles with professional organisations, and to the community through charitable, aged care, sporting and service groups.	
John Franklyn Fuhrmann	For service to the development of sport and recreation policy in Western Australia, and for contributions to a range of sporting organisations as an administrator, particularly for Australian Rules football.	
Paul Galy Galambos	For service to the community as a medical grade footwear practitioner and manufacturer.	
Peter Robert Gallagher	For service to the horseracing industry in Queensland as an administrator.	
David Marc Ganon	For service to the Jewish community of Perth through a range of religious, aged care and charitable organisations.	
Eric Edward (Joe) Gibson deceased	For service to the community of Condobolin through ex-service, charitable and sporting organisations.	
Robert Henry Gillespie QPM	For service to older persons, particularly through executive roles in the Probus movement.	
Brigadier Ian George Gilmore OBE retired	For service to the community, particularly through a range of ex-service, engineering and military bodies.	
Dr Loretta Rae Giorelli	For service to education as a teacher, university lecturer and consultant in the area of special education, particularly with regard to improving the learning outcomes of students with special needs in mainstream education.	
Max Graham	For service to local government and to the community of Nambucca, particularly through a range of charitable, aged care, disability support and emergency service organisations.	
David Ross Grant	For service to the community through the lifesaving movement, particularly the Royal Life Saving Society Australia, Victoria.	
Paul Francis Grew	For service to the community through a range of educational, health care and social welfare organisations.	
Richard Ware Griffin	For service to the surf lifesaving movement, particularly through the Freshwater Surf Life Saving Club.	
Maxwell Gordon Hall	For service to the community through service groups and sporting organisations.	
Wallace Halpin	For service to the surf lifesaving movement as an administrator, instructor and official, and to youth through a range of sporting clubs.	
Dorothy Hancock	For service to the community through ex-service, social welfare and migrant assistance organisations, and as a supporter of junior golf.	
Dr Peter Rex Harcourt	For service to sports medicine as a practitioner, administrator and educator, and through contributions to the development of anti-doping policies in sport.	
Colin Gregory Hardy	For service to the country music industry as a singer and recording artist, and to the community through the delivery of outreach zoological education programs in regional areas.	
Vonda Maude Hardy	For service to the community of Deloraine, particularly through a range of aged care organisations.	
Major Hilton Samuel Harmer	For service to the community through The Salvation Army, particularly as a court chaplain.	
Major Joyce Alice Harmer	For service to the community through The Salvation Army, particularly as a court chaplain.	
Brian William Harris	For service to the trade union movement, particularly through representation of employees in the local government sector.	
Gilbert Beric Hartwig	For service to the environment through conservation activities, particularly feral animal control, and to the sport of shooting.	
John Vernon Harvey	For service to the brewing industry, particularly through the Institute of Brewing and Distilling, and to the community through Rotary International.	
Dr William John Harvey	For service to dentistry as a practitioner and educator in the area of orthodontics, and to the community through support for charitable and church organisations.	
Neil Lawrence Harwood	For service to sport, particularly through executive roles with table tennis organisations, and to the community as a contributor to a range of horticultural groups.	
Mohamed Ahmed Hassan	For service to education and to the Islamic community, particularly as the founding Director of Minaret College.	
Flora Jean Haste	For service to the community of Wagga Wagga through arts and charitable organisations, and to the field of accountancy.	
John Leslie Hawes	For service to the welfare of veterans and their families through the Returned and Services League of Australia.	
Terrence Leslie Hearity	For service to the community through fundraising and administrative roles with a range of charitable and social welfare organisations.	
Robert James Henderson	For service to people with an intellectual disability through L'Arche Australia and as an advocate for human rights in Tasmania.	
Dr Richard Allen Herr	For service to higher education in the field of political science, as a commentator on national and international political issues, and to the community.	
John Wellisley Hiatt	For service to the community through administrative roles in the horseracing industry, as a supporter of Rugby League football in the Penrith area, and to the law.	
John William Hocking	For service to youth through the Scouting movement, and to the community of Glen Eira.	
Ian Keith Hodges	For service to the community, particularly through a range of police-related organisations.	
Robert Edgcumbe (Bob) Holloway	For service to primary industry, particularly as a contributor to dryland farming research and development.	
Raymond Vincent Hughes	For service to the community through the Scouting movement and local church roles.	
William Bloxsome Hughes	For service to the community of Glen Innes, particularly through the agricultural show movement and through a range of heritage, arts and service organisations.	
Norman Winter Hunter	For service to education, particularly in the independent schools sector, and as a contributor to curriculum and professional development in Queensland.	
Leonard Victor Hurley	For service to the community, particularly through the Norah Head Search and Rescue Boat Club.	
Penny Hurst	For service to the Jewish community, particularly through the United Israel Appeal of Australia and through fundraising for educational organisations.	
John Joseph Hynes	For service to veterans through the 2/1 Field Regiment Association.	
Alexander Ilyn	For service to the Russian community, particularly through cultural, arts, educational and children's organisations.	
Gregory Alan Ingersole	For service to the community through the Scouting movement and emergency service organisations.	
Darryl Rodney Jacob	For service to the community of Burrumbuttock, particularly through the development of the Wirraminna Environmental Education Centre.	
Violette Jameson	For service to the arts community of the Gympie-Cooloola region.	
Norman William Jenner	For service to the community, particularly through the Rotary Club of Toowoomba South and as a supporter of health and aged care, church, sporting and youth organisations.	
Laurence Michael (Larry) Jennett	For service to surf lifesaving as an administrator, coach and competitor, and to the community of the Illawarra region through a range of sporting, church and educational groups.	
Barry Charles Jiggins	For service to communities in Mongolia through the provision of humanitarian aid to the residents of the Gobi Desert region.	
Louanne Johns	For service to the community through Camp Quality South Australia.	
Doreen Edna Johns	For service to the community through children's ministry within the Anglican Church.	
Dr Raymond John Jones	For service to science through pasture and animal research benefiting the ruminant livestock industry.	
Kevin Robert Kakoschke	For service to the community through the preservation of the history of Radium Hill.	
Gwenda Dawn Kappe	For service to the community of Kangaroo Island through a range of welfare, charitable and cultural organisations.	
Associate Professor Jill Elizabeth Keefe	For service to public health, particularly in the area of vision testing, and as a contributor to the advancement of eye care education and practice.	
Jack Kelly	For service to the community through the brass band movement, and to music education.	
William Martin Kelly	For service to the community of Coonabarabran, particularly as a contributor to health sector development and through a range of service organisations.	
Patrick James (Pat) Kerin	For service to cricket and Australian Rules football in the Cootamundra region.	
The Reverend John Brailsford Kinsman	For service to the Anglican Church and to the community, particularly as a contributor to the establishment of Trinity College, Gawler.	
The Reverend Merrill Adele Kitchen	For service to religion and to the community as a leader of volunteer work groups to the Nazareth Hospital, Israel, and as a contributor in the field of theological education.	
Anthony Knight	For service to heritage conservation and the arts in Victoria, particularly through the National Trust of Australia (Victoria) and associated organisations, and through the promotion of Indigenous art.	
Peter Joseph Kolliner	For service to the Jewish community through cultural and religious organisations, to materials engineering and metallurgical education, and to the arts and tourism promotion in Melbourne.	
Henry Krug	For service to the Jewish community, particularly through the activities of B'nai B'rith.	
Audrey Elizabeth Lamb	For service to public health and to the community, particularly through the Hepatitis C Council of New South Wales.	
Harry Bradshaw Lambeth	For service to the community, particularly to youth through the Scouting movement.	
Betty Denice Lane	For service to horseracing, particularly as a trainer and promoter of the role of women in the sport.	
Edward Larsen	For service to surf lifesaving through a range of coaching and administrative roles.	
Shirley Lawrence	For service to the community through fundraising for the Peter MacCallum Cancer Centre.	
Dr Terence Henderson Lee	For service to viticulture and to the wine industry through research and development organisations, wine industry bodies and government advisory roles in Australia and overseas, and through tertiary education in the fields of viticulture and oenology.	
Lewis David Leicester DFC	For service to the community through ex-service, heritage and local government organisations.	
Esta Levy	For service to the Jewish community, particularly through the Jewish Centre on Ageing.	
John Kevin Liston	For service to the community of Pambula through educational, church, service and social welfare organisations.	
Charles Lynn Little	For service to the arts as an actor and lecturer in theatre appreciation, particularly for mature-age people in the community.	
Graham Neville Lloyd	For service to youth through the Scouting movement and through the Uniting Church.	
Mary Loy (née Allitt)	For service to sport through women's cricket, and as a horseriding instructor and equestrian judge.	
Keith Montague Lush	For service to the community through the Richmond Fellowship of New South Wales, and to veterans and their families.	
Percy Douglas Lyall	For service to the community through ex-service, church, youth and musical groups.	
Alexander Hugh (Lex) McAulay	For service to literature as a military historian.	
Cheryl Patricia McBride	For service to education as a school principal, teacher and advocate for children with autism and other disabilities, and to the community of Campbelltown through legal aid organisations and public housing projects.	
William James McCormack	For service to the community of Wangaratta and district through local government, emergency services, and sporting organisations.	
Professor Ann Margaret McGrath	For service to education, particularly in the field of Indigenous history, as a teacher, researcher and author, and through leadership roles with a range of history-related organisations.	
John Lachlan McInnes	For service to the community through educational, social welfare and sporting organisations and through roles in business and commerce.	
Gabrielle Antonia McIntosh	For service to education for disadvantaged youth through the establishment of the Blacktown Youth College.	
Moya McKeon	For service to the community of Beenleigh, particularly through Quota International.	
Ian William McKinley	For service to music as an educator, conductor, singer, organist and composer.	
Norman William Maddock	For service to the Victorian tramways, particularly through the Malvern Tramways Museum and as a union official.	
Mary Magee	For service to pharmacy, and to the community, particularly through roles supporting the advancement of women.	
Stephen James Maitland RFD	For service to the community through the Surf Life Saving Foundation and the Caloundra Surf Life Saving Club.	
John Stuart Maloney	For service to education, particularly in the field of financial management of independent schools, through executive roles with professional organisations, and to the Old Wesley Collegians' Association.	
Clayton Robson (Clay) Manners	For service to the dairy industry, particularly through policy contributions to national dairy and agricultural organisations and as an advocate for dairy farmers.	
Dr Peter Richard Mansfield	For service to medicine, particularly as an advocate for ethical pharmaceutical marketing practices and the quality use of medicines in Australia and in developing countries.	
Elizabeth Anne (Liz) Martin	For service to the road transport industry through the National Road Transport Hall of Fame and through support for families in the industry.	
Judith Bernice Martin	For service to the community through the support programs of Endeavour Ministries.	
Michael John Martin	For service to the community through educational and sporting organisations in the Northern Territory and through the promotion of professional financial accounting standards in public and private sector roles.	
Norma Joyce Massey	For service to lawn bowls as a player at local, state, national and international levels and through executive positions with bowling organisations.	
Ross David Matthews	For service to the community through surf lifesaving and the New South Wales State Emergency Service.	
Jordan Mavros	For service to the community of Geelong, particularly through executive roles in a range of multicultural organisations.	
Patrick Mells	For service to the community of Gawler, particularly through Lions Australia.	
Susan Anne Metcalfe	For service to the community as a contributor to the development of music education and performance in the Armidale district.	
Aleck Miller	For service to the community through a range of Freemasonry, Jewish and sporting organisations and roles.	
Johnny Japangardi Miller	For service to the community of Yuendumu and the surrounding region of the Northern Territory through programs addressing substance abuse among Indigenous youth.	
Phyllis June Miller	For service to local government and the community through executive and representational roles in state level local government associations in New South Wales.	
Deborah Gale Mills	For service to people with disabilities in north west Sydney through the programs of North West Disability Services Inc.	
Yvonne Leslie Moon	For service to the community, particularly through the Rotary Against Ovarian Cancer program.	
Cathy Joyce Mooney	For service to the community through fundraising and promotional activities of the Leukaemia Foundation of New South Wales.	
Dorothy Joan Moore	For service to the community of Moora, particularly through a range of women's, aged care and welfare organisations.	
Michael Andrew Moran	For service to the community of Nambucca Shire through local government, and to the surf lifesaving movement.	
Dr Kevin Moriarty	For service to medicine as an anaesthetist and through honorary medical appointments at the Royal Melbourne Zoo and surf lifesaving organisations.	
Joseph Ronald Muir	For service to the wool industry as a sheep shearer for over 60 years.	
Ronald Leslie Mullen	For service to the community as a foster carer and also as a pastoral care worker at William Angliss Hospital.	
Brian Audley Mullins	For service to the community, particularly through the Telstra Communications Museum.	
Colin Alexander Munro	For service to regional Australia through the promotion and preservation of rural culture, particularly through television and radio.	
Anne Patricia Murphy	For service to the community of Victoria, particularly through local government, health and child safety organisations.	
Peter Joseph Murphy	For service to the community of the Northern Territory through journalism and as a political adviser.	
Lynn Kenneth Murrell	For service to conservation and the environment through organisations involved with natural resource management and protection, and to local government.	
Mr John Dallas Nettleford	For service to medicine, particularly as a surgeon in rural South Australia, and to the community.	
Dr Charles Harold New	For service to medicine as an orthopaedic surgeon and through contributions to professional associations.	
Margaret Ann Newman	For service to the community through a range of service groups, including Rotary International and Inner Wheel Australia.	
Jack Newton	For service to golf, particularly through a range of executive, youth development and fundraising roles.	
John Lonsdale Newton	For service to the community of the Upper Gascoyne Shire, particularly through local government and health organisations.	
Bach Tuyet Nguyen	For service to the Vietnamese community as a radio broadcaster and through involvement with cultural groups, and as a supporter of charitable organisations.	
Dr Julia Mary Nicholls	For service to veterinary science through professional organisations, as a contributor to policy and professional standards development and as a mentor, particularly for overseas trained veterinarians.	
Roger Baillie Nicholson	For service to the community, particularly through support for youth organisations including Very Special Kids.	
Christine Marianne Nicol-Burmeister	For service to Australian-German relations through the promotion of social, cultural and business opportunities, particularly in Western Australia.	
Iris Irene Nicolaides	For service to the Greek community, particularly through the Women's Auxiliary of the Greek Orthodox Community of St George, and through support for Australian Red Cross Queensland.	
Christopher Raymond (Chris) Norwood	For service to the community of the Australian Capital Territory through Probus, Rotary International and tennis organisations.	
Dr Petar Novakovic	For service to medicine through the provision of ophthalmological services to people in remote areas of south west Queensland.	
Brother Henry Francis O'Halloran	For service to education as a teacher and administrator in the Catholic sector.	
Carmel Rose O'Hara	For service to the community of the Catholic Parish of West Wollongong as a volunteer in the church and as a member of a range of Catholic support groups.	
John Myles O'Reilly deceased	For service to the community of Tweed Heads through a range of horticultural, church and service organisations.	
Shirley Margaret O'Sullivan	For service to education, particularly in the area of parental and guardian support through the Melbourne Catholic Education Office.	
Noela May Oswin	For service to the community through the Queensland Country Women's Association and the Mother's Union of Australia.	
Frank James Owen	For service to veterans and their families through the Morphett Vale and District Sub-Branch of the Returned and Services League of Australia, and to the community of Onkaparinga.	
Ruth Tagala Palmani	For service to multiculturalism, particularly through assistance and support to the Filipino community in south east Queensland.	
Dr Alan George Parker	For service to dentistry, particularly in the field of orthodontics and oral and maxillofacial trauma management.	
Harold David Paroissien	For service to the community particularly through the Scouting movement and aged care organisations.	
Dennis Patisteas	For service to the Greek community through charitable, church, ex-service and business organisations.	
Lindsay Sinclair Paton	For service to the community, particularly through roles within the surf lifesaving movement in New South Wales.	
Ronald Ernest Pears	For service to the community, particularly through a range of roles at national, state and local levels within the surf lifesaving movement.	
Anne Mary (Annie) Phelan	For service to the arts as an actress, and to the community, particularly through support for women living with the HIV virus and for asylum seekers and refugees.	
Dr Stephen Roberts Phillips	For service to the medical profession and the community as an advocate for public health issues and as a promoter of the safe and effective use of medicines, particularly through the National Prescribing Service.	
John Douglas Philp	For service to primary industry as a grain and seed supplier and through contributions to the development of the industry, and to the community.	
Edward Arthur Pickett	For service to a range of sports as a player and coach at state and national levels, and through support for young sports people.	
Harry John Pickett	For service to the community through a range of charitable and service organisations, particularly through the activities of Rotary International, and to the meat industry.	
William Charles Pimm	For service to industrial relations through contributions to the development of effective outcomes and practices in the private and government sectors.	
Dr Owen Watkins Powell	For service to medicine, particularly through hospital administration and support for the development of medical research, public policy and health service planning.	
Maria Thérèse Prendergast	For service to the arts through support for museums, galleries and cultural events, and to the community, particularly through health care organisations.	
Alfred Neil Preston	For service to people with intellectual disabilities, particularly through quality assurance and reform of disability employment services.	
Elaine Pugh	For service to the community of Stanwell Park, particularly through the Country Women's Association of New South Wales.	
Margaret Ellen Pugh	For service to swimming and primary school sport in Queensland through a range of executive roles	
James (Jim) Purcell	For service to the community of Gladstone through a range of roles with the Voluntary Marine Rescue Service.	
Neil Ronald Purcell	For service to the community, particularly through roles within the surf lifesaving movement.	
Bevil Victor Purnell	For service to the community as a volunteer to a range of organisations providing assistance and welfare to refugees.	
Dorothy May Pyatt	For service to the community through the recording and preservation of the history and heritage of South Australian police through the South Australian Police Historical Society.	
Debra Jane Quabba	For service to the community of Babinda, particularly following the events caused by Tropical Cyclone Larry on 20 March 2006.	
Commander Kenneth Philip Railton RAN (retired)	For service to the welfare of current and former service personnel and their families as a senior executive with a range of defence organisations.	
Colleen Hazel Rankin	For service to the community of the Shire of Serpentine-Jarrahdale as an elected member of local government and through a range of aged care, youth and environmental organisations.	
Kurt Rathner	For service to the Jewish community through fundraising, youth and education organisations.	
Dr Kamalakaran Harry Ratnam	For service to medicine in the area of general practice, and to the community of Ipswich.	
Joan Florence Rich	For service to the community, particularly as a volunteer for the Australian Capital Territory Division of the Australian Red Cross.	
Frederick John Richards	For service to the community of the Moira Shire, particularly as a contributor to health sector development, and to the newsagency industry through the Victorian Authorised Newsagents Association.	
Sam Richardson	For service to small business as an industry leader and a proponent of the interests of the independent wholesale and retail sectors.	
Maureen Mary Riches	For service to the Indigenous community as an advocate for reconciliation and native title and through the fostering of multiculturalism in the community of Ballarat.	
Mervyn Desmond Riddle	For service to the community through veterans, school sports and church organisations.	
Charles William Riley	For service to furthering the sport of gliding in Australia and promoting tourism in the Tocumwal area.	
Gordon Edward Robert	For service to the community through a range of youth and sporting organisations, and to the engineering profession.	
Peter Rogers	For service to the community as a volunteer with a range of charitable organisations, and to education as a teacher and sports administrator.	
Dr Colin McIntosh Rose	For service to the community of Taree as a medical practitioner and through a number of charitable organisations.	
Janet Ross	For service to rural communities in south west Victoria through health administration roles and service organisations.	
Peter Russell Rutley	For service to youth through the Scouting movement, and to the community through charitable and service organisations.	
Denis Leslie Ryan	For service to the community through Foodbank Western Australia.	
Gavin Sandford-Morgan	For service to the preservation and restoration of vintage and veteran cars, and to the community.	
Martin Francis Sayers	For service to the floriculture industry, particularly as a plant propagator and advocate for the development and growth of the protea and native flower sector.	
Murray William Sayle	For service to media and communications, particularly as a foreign and war correspondent.	
Dulcie Margaret Schnitzerling	For service to the community of Babinda, particularly through support for emergency services following the events caused by Tropical Cyclone Larry on 20 March 2006.	
Leonard Arthur Schulz	For service to veterans and their families, particularly through the Ryde City and Districts Sub-Branch of the Vietnam Veterans' Association of Australia.	
Ian Joseph Scobie	For service to the community of Holbrook through health, educational and ex-service organisations and through local government.	
Geraldine Frances Scott	For service to the community of Devonport, particularly through the Devonport Eisteddfod Society.	
Vernon James Scott deceased	For service to the welfare of ex-service personnel and their families, and to the community of Heyfield.	
Albert Alexander Selig	For service to the Jewish community in Sydney	
Maurice Rea Sexton	For service to heritage conservation, particularly through the Kosciuszko Huts Association, and to the community of Canberra.	
Dr Alan Seymour	For service to the arts as a playwright and writer of screenplays, television scripts and novel adaptations.	
Dr Peter Feild Sharwood	For service to medicine as an orthopaedic surgeon, and to the community.	
Wolfgang (Wally) Sievers	For service to the taxi industry in South Australia through administrative roles with a range of bodies.	
Dr Peter Jakob Silberstein	For service to medicine, particularly as a paediatric neurologist, and through executive roles with disability support organisations.	
Barry Skews	For service to the community, particularly as a foster parent, and to organisations supporting disadvantaged children and youth.	
Lynette Skews	For service to the community, particularly as a foster parent, and to organisations supporting disadvantaged children and youth.	
David Murray Skinner	For service to the agricultural show movement, and to the community through Lions International.	
Donato (Don) Smarrelli	For service to multiculturalism and to the community of Melbourne, particularly through fundraising activities for organisations involved in medical research.	
Alan Bennett Smith	For service to the community of the Riverland region, particularly through the Murray River Skippers Association and charitable, ex-service and sporting organisations.	
Dr Graeme Robert Smith	For service to animal welfare through The Lost Dogs' Home, and to sport through junior soccer development.	
Charmaine Maureen Solomon	For service to food media, particularly as the author of Asian cookery books.	
Sandra Joy Southwell-Stevens	For service to the community as a foster carer of children and pre-adoptive newborns, and through support for young families.	
Warren John Starick	For service to primary industry, particularly through egg and poultry sector organisations, and to the community.	
Alan Frank Still	For service to the community through Rotary International as a provider of sponsorship for the education of children in Indonesia.	
Andrew William Stojanovski	For service to the community of Yuendumu and the surrounding region of the Northern Territory through programs addressing substance abuse among Indigenous youth.	
Jim Stynes	For service to youth, particularly through the establishment and development of the Reach Foundation, and to Australian Rules football as a player, coach and selector.	
Jeanette May Suhr	For service to the community through the establishment and development of the Road Trauma Support Team in Victoria.	
David Alan Swain	For service to surf lifesaving through a range of roles at a national, state and club level.	
Marjorie May Swales	For service to the welfare of women, particularly those within the prison system and those recently released, and their families.	
Thomaΐy Szegedi	For service to women with breast cancer and their families through the Thomaiy Breast Cancer Research Fund, and to the fashion industry.	
Dr Giuseppe Antonio Talia	For service to the arts, particularly through the development of the Melbourne City Opera.	
Marcelle Rosa Tanner	For service to the community as a performer and through fundraising activities.	
Marcus Robert Tawton	For service to the community, particularly to young people through the Canberra Police and Citizens Youth Club.	
Glen Kevyn Taylor	For service to the environment through the Natural History Society of South Australia.	
Clarence Rodney Thomas	For service to local government, and to the community of the Riverland region through welfare and service organisations.	
Gordon Alan Toms	For service to the community of Wauchope through a range of service, church and sporting organisations.	
Wing Commander James Alfred Treadwell AFC (retired)	For service to veterans and their families through a range of welfare and historical organisations.	
Namgyel Tsering	For service to the Tibetan community through raising cultural awareness and providing support for refugees.	
Dr Henry Ung	For service to the community of Gayndah as a medical practitioner	
Elaine le Neve Unkles	For service to physiotherapy and health administration, and to the community through the Wesley Mission Brisbane.	
Walter Thomas Upton DFM	For service to the conservation, cultivation and recognition of native Australian orchids.	
Dr Aldo Vacca	For service to medicine in the field of obstetrics and gynaecology, particularly through the research and promotion of the technique of vacuum extraction delivery in obstetric practice.	
Gerrit (Gerry) Van Burgel	For service to the community of Harvey, particularly through local government, health, emergency, agricultural, youth and service organisations.	
Joy Van de Meene	For service to people with a disability, particularly through Crossroads Queensland Holiday Tours.	
Henk Vogels	For service to the sport of cycling, particularly as a supporter of junior competitors and through a range of administrative, coaching and officiating roles.	
Francis William Voutier	For service to veterans and their families, particularly as a fundraiser through the Croyden Sub-Branch of the Returned and Services League of Australia.	
Joan Wakeford	For service to the community, particularly through the development of mental health services in the Hunter New England area.	
Kenneth Russell Ward	For service to veterans and their families, particularly through the Padstow Sub-Branch of the Returned and Services League of Australia and a range of naval organisations.	
Nancy Elaine Waters	For service to the community of Kiama, particularly through the agricultural show Suamovement.	
Susan Patricia Watson	For service to the community, particularly through charitable organisations, and to local government.	
Patricia Margaret Watts	For service to the community of Willoughby.	
Margaret Maddern Webb	For service to education as Principal of Toorak College, to the promotion and development of outdoor learning initiatives, and to Girls Sport Victoria.	
Peter Roderick Webb	For service to the arts as a musician, conductor, composer and teacher.	
Edward Christian (Ted) Webber	For service to Rugby League football, and to the community of the Wide Bay region, particularly through the development and support of vocational education programs.	
Avice Wells	For service to the community of Tweed Heads through View Clubs of Australia and the War Widows' Guild of Australia.	
Nancy Elaine Wendon	For service to the community of Wyong, particularly through the Toukley and District Senior Citizens Club, and to local government.	
Harold Francis West	For service to the community through a range of local government, ex-service, civic and youth organisations.	
Betty Eirene White	For service to nursing, particularly as a nurse educator, and to the community through the University of the Third Age	
Phillip Stanley White	For service to the community through the promotion of military history as a member of the Victorian Branch of the Vietnam Veterans Association of Australia	
Shirley Josephine White	For service to people with a disability, particularly through The House with No Steps.	
Norma Irene Whitfield	For service to veterans and their families, particularly through the War Widows' Guild of Australia.	
The Very Reverend Christopher Gordon Whittall	For service to the community, particularly through church, health sector and youth support roles in the Rockhampton region.	
Jean Cecilia Wickham	For service to the community through local government, charitable, health and aged care organisations.	
Ellen Widdowson	For service to the community of Bundaberg through a range of cultural and social welfare organisations.	
Michael Thurin Wille	For service to health administration in Queensland through a range of organisations, and to the commercial biotechnology and pharmaceutical industries.	
Harold William (Bill) Williams	For service to the coal mining industry in Western Australia, particularly through the establishment of education and training initiatives.	
Dr Frederick Ross Wilson	For service to medicine as a general practitioner through the provision of medical services and training in rural and remote areas.	
Dr Robin Jean Wilson	For service to the community through the provision of mental health services and to organisations that provide assisted accommodation for people who are unable to live independently.	
Clifford Denise Wise	For service to the community, particularly through organisations that support people with disabilities.	
Graeme Louis Woolacott	For service to the community through Rotary health and aid programs and through the Parent-Infant Research Institute.	
Brett Walter Woolfitt	For service to rowing as an umpire, administrator and through a range of support roles.	
Desborough Wright	For service to veterans and to the community of Mindarie through initiatives supporting the preservation of military history.	
Neil Edwin Wykes	For service to the community through organisations concerned with the health care ofpeople in the criminal justice system, to the accountancy profession, and to charitable organisations.	
The Reverend Canon Honor Helen Yearsley	For service to the Anglican Church of Australia, particularly in Tasmania, in the field of Christian education and as an advocate of lay ministry and the ordination of women.	
Stanley Yee	For service to the Chinese community through the hospitality industry, to aged care through administrative roles in nursing homes, and to support of cancer research organisations.	
Beverley Gai Young	For service to people with disabilities, and to the preservation of Australian wildlife.	
Tadeusz Henryk Zakrocynski	For service to the Polish community in South Australia.	
Professor John Raymond Zalcberg	For service to medicine in the field of oncology through initiatives to assist cancer patients and their families and through the promotion of clinical research.	
Karoline (Karla) Zolshan	For service to the community through a range of charitable and welfare organisations, particularly within the Jewish community.	

==== Military Division ====
Branch	Recipient	Citation	Notes
Navy	Lieutenant Commander Mitchell Edwards RAN	For meritorious performance of duty as Commanding Officer of Her Majesty's Australian Ships Wewak, Whyalla and Dubbo.	
Navy	Commander John Patrick Mayfield RANR	For meritorious service in the Royal Australian Navy and the Australian Defence Force over a career spanning forty-one years and, more recently, as Deputy Director Capability Projects.	
Navy	Warrant Officer Alan Charles O'Shea	For meritorious service in the performance of duties as the Command Warrant Officer in the Royal Australian Navy's Recruit School and in other positions throughout his Navy career.	
Navy	Lieutenant Commander Andrew Craig Wright RAN	For meritorious service as the Marine Engineering Officer of HMAS Parramatta.	
Army	Warrant Officer Class One Terry Joan Beer	For meritorious performance of duty as the Operations Warrant Officer and Call Centre Supervisor at the National Welfare Coordination Centre.	
Army	Warrant Officer Class One Shayne Randyn Burley	For meritorious service as the Regimental Sergeant Major of the 1st/15th Royal New South Wales Lancers and of the 2nd/14th Light Horse Regiment (Queensland Mounted Infantry).	
Army	Warrant Officer Class One John Owen Frazer	For meritorious service as the Regimental Sergeant Major of the Distribution Division, Army Logistic Training Centre and the 3rd Combat Service Support Battalion.	
Army	Warrant Officer Class One Mustafa Jesenkovic CSC	For meritorious service to the 1st Health Support Battalion, the Army School of Administration and Health, and the Royal Australian Army Medical Corps.	
Army	Warrant Officer Class One Grant Stephen McFarlane	For meritorious service as Regimental Sergeant Major of the 10th/27th Battalion, The Royal South Australian Regiment, Wing Sergeant Major, Rifleman Wing, School of Infantry and Regimental Sergeant Major of the 3rd Battalion, The Royal Australian Regiment.	
Army	Warrant Officer Class One Kevin Michael Ryan	For meritorious service as Regimental Sergeant Major of the Al Muthanna Task Group Two.	

== Meritorious Service ==
=== Public Service Medal (PSM) ===
PSM ribbon

Branch	Recipient	Citation	Notes
Federal	Jan Elizabeth Adams	For outstanding public service in pursuing Australia's international objectives on trade and the environment, particularly the Asia-Pacific Partnership on Clean Development and Climate.	
Federal	Julie Bennett	For outstanding public service in the delivery of improved services to clients of the Department of Veterans' Affairs, particularly her role in establishing a consolidated telephone enquiry service in the Victorian office known as the Veterans' Enquiry Service.	
Federal	Richard Anthony Caton	For outstanding public service as Second Secretary at the Australian Embassy in Dili, particularly during the crisis period in East Timor in 2006.	
Federal	Helen Elizabeth Daniels	For outstanding public service in implementing the Australian Government's copyright reform agenda.	
Federal	Gerard Patrick Early	For outstanding public service in the protection and conservation of Australia's natural environment and cultural heritage.	
Federal	Dr Margaret Hilda Friedel	For outstanding public service in the field of arid zone research.	
Federal	Peter John Hamburger	For outstanding public service in building a strong relationship between the public services of Australia and Indonesia, particularly in the area of cabinet and policy coordination processes.	
Federal	Yoshiko Kassmena Hirakawa	For outstanding public service in the development of policy, project management and the coordination of secretariat services in the Torres Strait Regional Authority.	
Federal	Hank Leonard Jongen	For outstanding public service as Centrelink's media spokesperson and in leading innovations in marketing and communications.	
Federal	Simon Joseph Lewis	For outstanding public service in the achievement of asset management objectives, particularly the sale of the remaining government shareholding in Telstra (T3).	
Federal	Dr Judith Maureen Pearce	For outstanding public service in the development and delivery of online library services.	
Federal	Garry John Wall	For outstanding public service to Australian industry, particularly his significant contribution to the 2006 Review of Uranium Mining, Processing and Nuclear Energy.	
Federal	Bernadette Tracy Welch	For outstanding public service in leading the restructure of the HIH Claims Support Scheme and the logistical arrangements for the Meeting of G-20 Finance Ministers and Central Bank Governors held in Melbourne in November 2006.	
Federal	Dr Ian Sidney Williams	For outstanding public service in the implementation of the Kinnaird reforms for defence procurement and the establishment of the Defence Materiel Organisation as a prescribed agency.	
Federal	Paul Stephen Williams	For outstanding public service through leadership of the 2006 Census of Population and Housing and to census data collection, nationally and internationally.	
New South Wales	Margaret Mary Brazel	For outstanding public service, particularly to rail transport within New South Wales	
New South Wales	David Andrew Harriss	For outstanding public service, particularly in the field of water management.	
New South Wales	Stuart James Henderson	For outstanding public service in the field of industrial relations within the NSW Fire Brigades.	
New South Wales	Josephine Lily Howse	For outstanding public service in the strategic implementation of several new techniques and technologies in Braille and large print production.	
New South Wales	Terence John Korn	For outstanding public service within the NSW Department of Environment and Conservation.	
New South Wales	Frances Mary McPherson	For outstanding public service in delivering significant improvements to the functioning of several public sector agencies.	
New South Wales	Catherine Maree Mardell	For outstanding public service in increasing community awareness, knowledge and appreciation of nature conservation and environmental management issues.	
New South Wales	Gregory John "Greg" Rochford	For outstanding public service in the management of the NSW Ambulance Service.	
New South Wales	Murali Jagannadha Sagi	For outstanding public service to the Judicial Commission of New South Wales, particularly in the provision of information technology.	
New South Wales	Emanuel Sklavounos	For outstanding public service within New South Wales, particularly to state administration, parliamentary and ministerial support, and statutory remuneration policy.	
New South Wales	John Stuart Watson	For outstanding public service in the field of workplace safety.	
Victoria	Dr Peter Thomas Doyle	For outstanding public service and leadership within Australia and internationally in the field of animal science and in the effective transfer of his knowledge to a broad range of beneficiaries.	
Victoria	Valerie Joan Gill	For outstanding public service in the field of autism spectrum disorder and Asperger syndrome.	
Victoria	John Leatherland	For outstanding public service, particularly to vulnerable families and children, and to people with disabilities.	
Victoria	Karen Jane Owen	For outstanding public service in the development of policy and the management, treatment and rehabilitation of sex offenders.	
Victoria	Mandy Maree Smith	For outstanding public service in the development, management and operation of the women's correctional system in Victoria.	
Victoria	Nicole Suzanne Stuart	For outstanding public service and exemplary leadership in the fostering, implementation and nurturing of inter-agency relationships between the Department of Education and Department of Human Services.	
Victoria	Teresa Zerella	For outstanding public service in the development and management of the Dispute Settlement Centre of Victoria.	
Queensland	Dr John Peter Beumer	For outstanding public service in the field of marine fish habitat protection and fisheries management.	
Queensland	Stuart Patrick Brooker	For outstanding public service in developing the economy and infrastructure of Queensland	
Queensland	Peter James Dent	For outstanding public service and contribution to the high standards of mine safety in Queensland.	
Queensland	Alan William Keates OAM	For outstanding public service to local government and to the communities of the Wondai Shire.	
Western Australia	Ricky Burges	For outstanding public service, particularly as the chief executive officer of the Western Australian Local Government Association.	
Western Australia	Jeffrey Craig	For outstanding public service as a leader in regional development in the Kimberley region of Western Australia.	
South Australia	Andrew Ferguson McPharlin	For outstanding public service in the field of water management.	
South Australia	Jack Anthony Nicolaou	For outstanding public service in the administration and management of Crown lands.	

=== Australian Fire Service Medal (AFSM) ===
AFSM ribbon

Branch	Recipient	Notes
New South Wales	John Darrell A'Beckett	
New South Wales	Brian Stanley Ayliffe	
New South Wales	William David Clifford	
New South Wales	Kevin William Duff	
New South Wales	Keith Robert King	
New South Wales	Stephen Charles McCrae	
New South Wales	David Keith McMonnies	
New South Wales	Gary John Meers	
New South Wales	Vincent Leonard Oliver	
New South Wales	Alan (Sam) Walker	
New South Wales	John David Wood	
Victoria	Peter Raymond Billing	
Victoria	Jeffrey William Burzacott	
Victoria	Edward Alan Clay	
Victoria	James Coleman Dalton	
Victoria	Maxwell John McLean	
Victoria	Brian James McNeal	
Victoria	Jurgen Werner Sildatke	
Victoria	Michael Anthony Walker	
Victoria	Leon Roy Williams	
Queensland	Mervyn Roy Gibson	
Western Australia	Phillip Joseph Brown	
Western Australia	Robert William Murphy	
Western Australia	Donald Charles Stewart	
South Australia	Gregory Keith Butler	
South Australia	Dean Spencer Elliott	
South Australia	David Malcolm Scarce	
Northern Territory	Graham Stewart Johnson	

=== Ambulance Service Medal (ASM) ===
ASM ribbon

Branch	Recipient	Notes
New South Wales	Paul John Featherstone BM	
New South Wales	Peter Roy Pilon	
New South Wales	Paul Leslie Woodgate	
Queensland	Patrick John (Pat) Denham	
Queensland	Ian Leslie Rizzoli	
South Australia	Michael Dundas Scott	
Tasmania	David Peter Curtis	
Tasmania	Noel Mervyn Dalwood	
Tasmania	Robert John Jordan	
Australian Capital Territory	David Andrew Foot	

=== Emergency Services Medal (ESM) ===
ESM ribbon

Branch	Recipient	Notes
Victorian Emergency Services	Andrew Thomas Varga	
Queensland Emergency Services	Allen William Lemon	
South Australia Emergency Services	Cheryl Louise Dalling	
South Australia Emergency Services	Jennifer Maree Vincent	

== Distinguished and Conspicuous Service ==
=== Distinguished Service Cross (DSC) ===
DSC ribbon

Branch	Recipient	Citation	Notes
Army	Lieutenant Colonel John Loughlin Gould	For distinguished command and leadership as Commander of the Special Operations Task Group during Operation Slipper Rotation Two.	
Army	Lieutenant Colonel Peter John Short	For distinguished command and leadership in action as commanding officer of Al Muthanna Task Group Two on Operation Catalyst, Iraq.	

=== Commendation for Distinguished Service ===
Commendation for Distinguished Service ribbon

Branch	Recipient	Citation	Notes
Navy	Lieutenant Commander Jonathan Paul Earley	For distinguished service as the Executive Officer of HMAS Ballarat during the ship's deployment to Operation Catalyst from March to September 2006.	
Navy	Leading Seaman David Melvern Horton	For distinguished service as Command and Control Supervisor of HMAS BALLARAT during the ship's deployment to Operation CATALYST from March to September 2006.	
Army	Warrant Officer Class Two Daniel Braban	For distinguished service as the Officer in Charge and Human Intelligence Control Officer of the Field Human Intelligence Team, AMTG 2 as part of Operation Catalyst.	
Army	Major Kyle Patrick Tyrrell	For distinguished performance of duties in warlike operations as the Officer Commanding Australian Security Detachment IX – Baghdad in 2006.	

=== Conspicuous Service Cross (CSC) ===
Conspicuous Service Cross ribbon

Branch	Recipient	Citation	Notes
Navy	Lieutenant Commander Russell Mark Crawford	For outstanding achievement as a member of the Australian Contingent for the Australian Defence Force's contribution to the United Nations Mission in Sudan.	
Navy	Captain Lindsay Chappell Evans	For outstanding achievement as the Director of Navy Weapons Systems in support of the Technical Regulation of Navy Materiel.	
Navy	Commander Mark Leslie Potter	For outstanding achievement as Commanding Officer of the Royal Australian Navy's Recruit School.	
Navy	Commander Allen Mark Whittaker	For outstanding achievement as the Training Authority – Aviation.	
Air Force	Warrant Officer John Benyon	For outstanding achievement as the Test One Specialist Training Officer at Number 92 Wing Development Flight.	
Air Force	Warrant Officer Grant Anthony Colhoun	For outstanding achievement to the Royal Australian Air Force in the field of Airfield Defence	
Air Force	Squadron Leader John Welby Davidson	For outstanding achievement as the Commanding Officer of the Forward Air Control and Development Unit.	
Air Force	Flight Lieutenant Kay Hamilton Ellis	For outstanding achievement as the Royal Australian Air Force Next-of-Kin Relations Officer	
Air Force	Squadron Leader Adam Luke Hughes	For outstanding achievement as a Medical Officer at Number 322 Combat Support Squadron.	
Army	Lieutenant Colonel Rolf Audrins	For outstanding achievement as the Staff Officer Grade One, Development at the Army Logistic Training Centre.	
Army	Colonel Andrew Thomas Condon	For outstanding achievement as the Commander Joint Task Force 629, Operation Ramp.	
Army	Corporal William Zeath Harper	For outstanding achievement as a Recruit Instructor at the Army Recruit Training Centre, Blamey Barracks Kapooka.	
Army	Lieutenant Colonel Andrew Lockhart McLachlan	For outstanding achievement as South Australian Panel Leader, Australian Army Legal Corps, in support of Australian Defence Force units in South Australia, in particular the 9th Brigade.	
Army	Lieutenant Colonel Michael Anthony Mumford	For outstanding achievement as the Commanding Officer of Battle Group Faithful on Operation Astute.	
Army	Lieutenant Colonel Ian William Upjohn	For outstanding achievement as Commanding Officer of 4th/19th Prince of Wales's Light Horse within the 4th Brigade.	

=== Bar to the Conspicuous Service Cross (CSC and Bar) ===
Branch	Recipient	Citation	Notes
Army	Lieutenant Colonel Andrew William Bottrell CSC	For outstanding achievement as the Commander of the Joint Task Force 631 Logistic Component during Operation ASTUTE.	

=== Conspicuous Service Medal (CSM) ===
Conspicuous Service Medal ribbon

Branch	Recipient	Citation	Notes
Navy	Warrant Officer Paul Robert Cohen	For outstanding service as the Signals and Communications Officer in HMAS Kanimbla.	
Navy	Captain Anthony Carl Dalton	For outstanding service as Director Navy Aviation Projects managing projects to acquire capability in support of the Royal Australian Navy.	
Navy	Chief Petty Officer Darren Francis Dyball	For outstanding service as Chief Petty Officer Physical Training Instructor at HMAS Stirling.	
Navy	Lieutenant Commander Paul Rodney Lea	For outstanding service as a Sea King Helicopter pilot instructor at 817 Squadron and HMAS Albatross.	
Navy	Chief Petty Officer James Rodney Richards	For outstanding service as the Operational Surveillance Branch Electronic Intelligence Manager in the Joint Operations Intelligence Centre Australia.	
Navy	Chief Petty Officer David Russell Smit	For outstanding service as Human Resources Manager at HMAS Stirling.	
Army	Warrant Officer Class One Noel Joseph Allport	For outstanding service as the Regimental Quartermaster Sergeant of the 3rd Battalion, The Royal Australian Regiment.	
Army	Major Craig Douglas Bickell	For outstanding service as the Joint Task Force 631 Staff Officer Intelligence during the lead up to the security crisis in Timor Leste and on Operation Astute	
Army	Chaplain Timothy Noel Booker	For outstanding service as the deployed Chaplain to Battle Group Faithful, Operation Astute and the 3rd Battalion, The Royal Australian Regiment.	
Army	Captain Emma Kate Booker	For outstanding service as the Training Development Officer at the Defence Police Training Centre.	
Army	Sergeant Dean Alexander Clark	For outstanding service as the Training and Assessment Sergeant at the 1st Recruit Training Battalion.	
Army	Lieutenant Colonel Clifford Frederick Cole	For outstanding service as the Staff Officer Grade One Operations and Plans, Headquarters 1st Joint Movements Group, in producing the Australian Defence Force joint movements effect for Operations Catalyst, Slipper, Anode, Astute, Ramp, Sumatra, Thai and Pakistan Assist during 2005 and 2006.	
Army	Captain Giles Julia Cornelia	For outstanding service as an instructor and Officer Commanding Bridges Company at the Royal Military College – Duntroon.	
Army	Warrant Office Class Two Matthew Thomas Denton	For outstanding service as the senior Manager, Communication Support Systems at the Defence Force School of Signals.	
Army	Captain Linda Joy Gillett	For outstanding service in support of operational deployments and training support tasks for 17th Combat Service Support Brigade elements at Brigade headquarters and unit level.	
Army	Warrant Office Class Two Wayne Macdonald Harper	For outstanding service as the Squadron Sergeant Major of the 171st Aviation Squadron.	
Army	Warrant Officer Class Two Peter Richard Horley	For outstanding service as the Manager of the Army Experimental Warfighting Facility at the Land Warfare Development Centre.	
Army	Chaplain David Ernest Jackson	For outstanding service as a Chaplain to the Australian Army while serving with the Special Air Service Regiment at Swanbourne and on Operations.	
Army	Warrant Officer Class One Stephen John Keogh	For outstanding service as the medical technician trademaster and instructor at the Army Logistic Training Centre.	
Army	Major Luke Cameron Martin	For outstanding service as the Joint Logistic Group Liaison Officer to Joint Task Force 631 on Operation Astute.	
Army	Captain Lee Arnold Melberzs	For outstanding service as the Second-in-Charge, Australian Defence Force Dental School.	
Army	Major Darren John Moore	For outstanding service as the Operations Officer at the Defence Network Support Agency.	
Army	Warrant Officer Class Two Eric Louis Pattingale	For outstanding service as the Artificer Sergeant Major, 1st/19th Battalion The Royal New South Wales Regiment.	
Army	Sergeant Adam Raoul Valladares	For outstanding service as the Senior Transport Corporal at 16th Air Defence Regiment.	
Army	Warrant Officer Two Geoffrey Thomas Vaughan	For outstanding service as Manager Operational Movements at the Joint Movements Control Office Melbourne between January 2005 and September 2006.	
Army	Warrant Officer One Michelle Wyatt	For outstanding service as the Regimental Sergeant Major of Joint Task Force 632, Operation Pakistan Assist.	
Air Force	Flight Lieutenant David John Clyde	For outstanding service as the Officer-in-Charge of Satellite and Information Systems at Number 1 Combat Communications Squadron.	
Air Force	Warrant Officer Bruce Edward Homwood	For outstanding service as an Implementation Team Member and Warrant Officer Operations at Number 87 Squadron.	
Air Force	Warrant Officer Phillip Scott Mackie	For outstanding service as a Senior Non-Commissioned Officer in the field of C130 Hercules aircraft operations at Number 36 Squadron.	
Air Force	Warrant Officer David Andrew Neylan	For outstanding service while employed as Temporary Officer-in-Charge of Number 1 Air Terminal Squadron Detachments Amberley and Darwin.	

=== Nursing Service Cross (NSC) ===
Nursing Service Cross ribbon

Branch	Recipient	Citation	Notes
Army	Sergeant Geoffrey Ian Cox	For an act of exceptional dedication in the performance of nursing duties as a member of the Royal Australian Army Medical Corps, Defence Co-operation Program – East Timor.	
Army	Warrant Officer Class Two Alastair George Mackenzie	For an act of exceptional dedication in the performance of nursing duties as a member of the Royal Australian Army Medical Corps, Defence Co-operation Program – East Timor.	
Army	Captain Jane Anne Mateer	For outstanding devotion and competency in nursing duties on Operation CATALYST at the United States Air Force Theatre Hospital, Balad, Iraq.	
