= Pegrum =

Pegrum is a surname. Notable people with this surname include:

- Annabelle Pegrum (born 1952), Australian architect
- Charlie Pegrum (born 2004), English footballer
- Nigel Pegrum (born 1949), music producer now in Australia
- Amanda Rosario, born Amanda Pegrum, British actress
