= Ken Duncan =

Ken or Kenneth Duncan may refer to:

- Ken Duncan (photographer) (born 1954), Australian photographer
- Ken Duncan (politician) (born 1945), Louisiana state treasurer
- Ken Duncan (American football) (born 1946), punter in the National Football League
- Kenne Duncan (1903–1972), Canadian-born B-movie character actor
- Kenneth Forrest Duncan (1881–1952), public servant and political figure in British Columbia
- Kenneth Charles Duncan, Australian architect
- Sandy Duncan (athlete) (1912–2005), English sprinter
