= Mary Dunne =

Mary Dunne may refer to:

- Mary Chavelita Dunne Bright, better known by her pen name George Egerton (1859–1945), Australian-born British writer of short stories, novels, plays, and translations
- Mary Dunne (scientist) (1926–2020), Australian scientist and Sister of Mercy

== See also ==
- I Am Mary Dunne, a 1968 novel by Brian Moore
