= Australian Institute of Architects =

Professional body (organisation) of Australian Architects

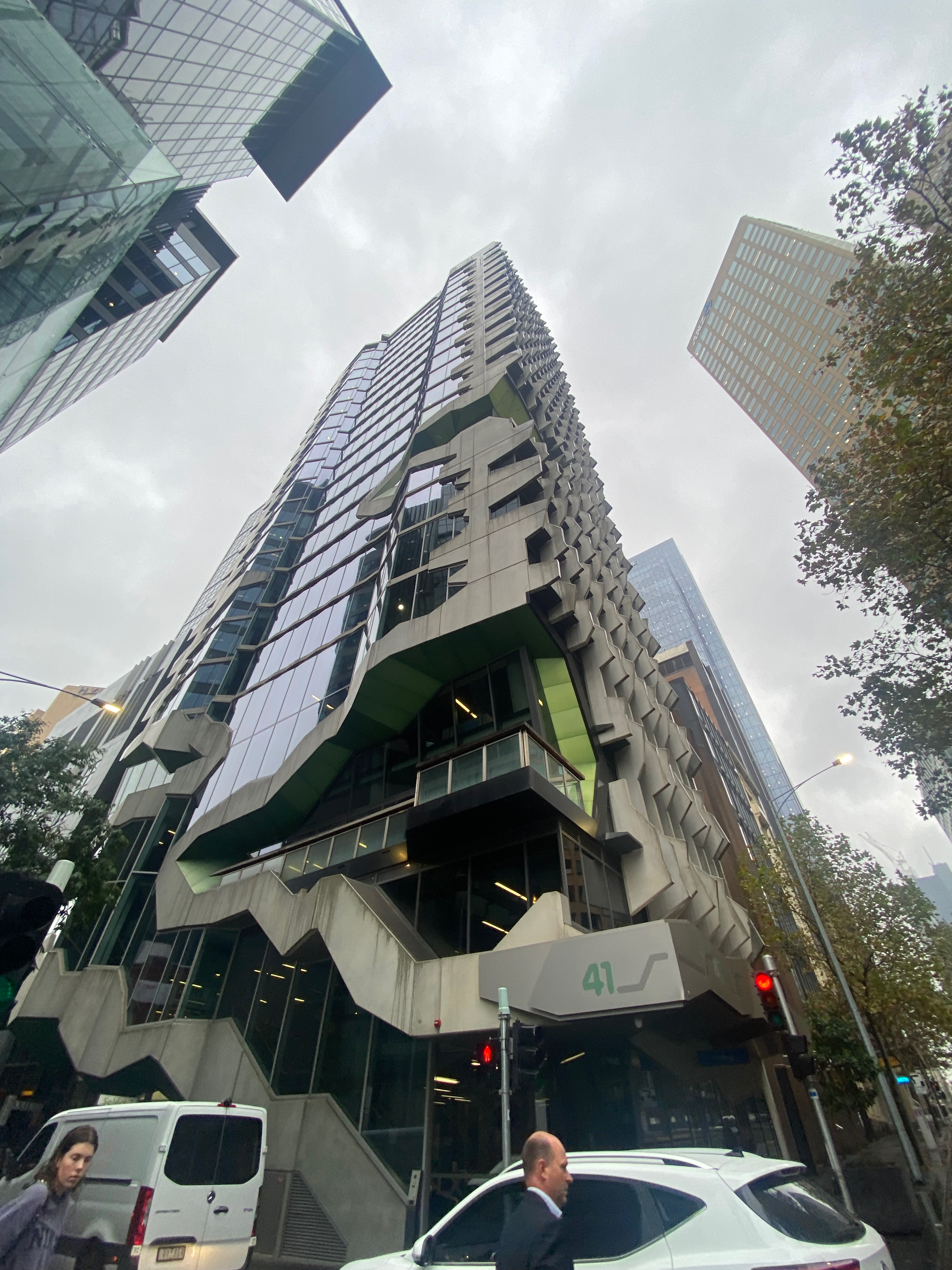
- AIA National and Victoria Chapter Offices, corner of Exhibition Street and Flinders Lane, Melbourne by Lyons Architects 2014
- Abbreviation: RAIA
- Formation: 6 September 1929; 97 years ago
- Legal status: Professional body; members association
- Headquarters: Level 1, 41 Exhibition Street, Melbourne
- Location: Melbourne
- Region served: Australia
- Fields: Architecture
- Members: 13,798 individual, 1925 A+ practices (2022)
- CEO: Prof. Cameron Bruhn
- President: David Wagner
- Subsidiaries: NSW Chapter; VIC Chapter; QLD Chapter; SA Chapter; WA Chapter; TAS Chapter; NT Chapter; ACT Chapter
- Affiliations: International Union of Architects
- Website: Architecture.com.au

The Australian Institute of Architects, officially the Royal Australian Institute of Architects (abbreviated as RAIA), is Australia's professional body for architects. Its members use the post-nominals FRAIA (Fellow), ARAIA (Associate Member) and RAIA (Member, also the organisation's abbreviation). The Institute supports 14,000 members across Australia, including 550 Australian members who are based in architectural roles across 40 countries outside Australia. SONA (Student Organised Network for Architecture) is the national student-membership body of the Australian Institute of Architects. EmAGN (Emerging Architects and Graduates Network) represents architectural professionals within 15 years of graduation, as part of the Australian Institute of Architects.

== History ==
=== State institutes ===
A number of Australian colonies (later states) formed independent professional societies for architects.

The Royal Victorian Institute of Architects (RVIA) was established as the Victorian Institute of Architects in the colony of Victoria in August 1856, receiving royal charter in 1889.

After a couple of predecessors dating at least as far back as 1859, the South Australian Institute of Architects was founded in the colony of South Australia on 20 September 1886, and in 1904 Walter Hervey Bagot designed its seal. It did not join the national organisation until 1962.

The New South Wales Institute of Architects was established in 1871, headed by George Allen Mansfield. The secretary was Benjamin Backhouse, who was later a Member of the NSW Legislative Council.

The Queensland Institute of Architects was established in 1888, and the West Australian Institute of Architects (WAIA) in 1896.

=== Australian Institute of Architects established 1929 ===
The Australian Institute of Architects was established on 6 September 1929, when state architectural institutes combined to form a unified national association. The RVIA became a foundation member of the federated body in 1929. On 18 August 1930 the 'Royal' title was granted, and it became the Royal Australian Institute of Architects.

The Queensland Institute of Architects joined in 1930, with WAIA following in March 1943. SAIA joined up in July 1962, becoming the "South Australian Chapter".

The national headquarters was formerly located in Red Hill, Canberra, in a 1968 building designed by Bryce Mortlock from Sydney firm Ancher, Mortlock and Woolley. This building still functions as the ACT Chapter offices.

In August 2008, following an informal poll of members in 2001, the National Council resolved to continue trading as the 'Australian Institute of Architects', while retaining 'Royal Australian Institute of Architects' as the legal name. The postnominals of FRAIA (Fellow) and RAIA (Members and organisation abbreviation) continue to be used with the legal name abbreviated.

== Purpose, functions, affiliations ==
In the preamble of the AIA's constitution states its wider purpose as "The Royal Australian Institute of Architects, established in 1930, is a national member based organisation for the architecture profession. The Institute supports and advances the architecture profession by advocating for high quality design and responsible sustainability for the built environment."

As a professional body representing architects, the institute is represented on many national and state industry and government bodies, and is affiliated with the International Union of Architects (UIA).

A chapter is maintained in each state and territory. Each chapter runs a range of events, activities and annual state and regional architecture awards, that feed into the national awards program.

== National awards and prizes ==
=== National Architecture Awards ===
The National Architecture Awards are held in late October or early November each year and have been presented since 1981. The shortlisted entrants are drawn from relevant state based awards programs held earlier in the year (usually in June or July). The awards cover residential, public, education, commercial, interiors, small projects, urban design, international projects, steel construction and sustainability.

=== National Prizes ===
National Prizes have been awarded annually since 2010, usually in early May and often as part of the Australian Architecture Conference. Each prize has a separate jury who assess a shortlist in each category. The inaugural 'Australian Achievement in Architecture Awards' were held on 18 March 2010 at the Gallery of Modern Art in Brisbane, presented separately to the National Awards. In 2017 the program was renamed as 'National Prizes'. National Prizes recognise achievement across a range of categories that support and promote advocacy, innovation and education, and do not relate to particular buildings which are judged at the National Awards later in the same year.

==== AIA Gold Medal ====
The AIA Gold Medal is the highest individual prize of the Australian Institute of Architects and had been presented annually since 1960.

==== Other National Prizes ====
- Paula Whitman Leadership in Gender Equity Prize
- National Emerging Architect Prize
- National President's Prize
- Leadership in Sustainability Prize
- Student Prize for the Advancement of Architecture

== State and Territory architecture awards and prizes ==
Each of the State and Territory chapters also present annual awards, including Australian Capital Territory, New South Wales, Northern Territory, Queensland, South Australia, Tasmania, Western Australia and Victoria. The winners of these awards form the shortlist for consideration of the National Awards later in the same year. The International Chapter of the AIA also run an awards program.

=== Regional architecture awards and prizes ===
Separately judged awards occur in regional New South Wales and Queensland.

== National Presidents ==
- 1929–1930 Alfred Samuel Hook
- 1930–1931 William Arthur Mordey Blackett
- 1931–1932 Philip Rupert Claridge
- 1932–1933 Lange Powell
- 1933–1934 Charles Edward Serpell
- 1934–1935 Arthur William Anderson
- 1935–1936 Guy St John Makin
- 1936–1937 James Nangle
- 1937–1938 Louis Laybourne Smith CMG
- 1938–1939 Frederick Bruce Lucas
- 1939–1940 Otto Albrecht Yuncken
- 1940–1942 William Ronald Richardson
- 1942–1944 John Francis Deighton Scarborough
- 1944–1946 Roy Sharrington Smith
- 1946–1948 William Rae Laurie
- 1948–1950 Jack Denyer Cheesman
- 1950–1952 Cobden Parkes
- 1952–1954 Robert Snowden Demaine
- 1954–1956 Edward James Archibald Weller
- 1956–1957 William Purves Race Godfrey
- 1957–1959 Wilfred Thomas Haslam
- 1959–1960 Kenneth Charles Duncan
- 1960–1961 Thomas Brenan Femister Gargett
- 1961–1962 Henry Ingham Ashworth
- 1962–1963 James Campbell Irwin
- 1963–1964 Max Ernest Collard
- 1964–1965 Raymond Berg
- 1965–1966 Gavin Walkley
- 1966–1967 Mervyn Henry Parry
- 1967–1968 Acheson Best Overend
- 1968–1969 Jack Hobbs McConnell
- 1969–1970 John David Fisher
- 1970–1971 Ronald Andrew Gilling
- 1971–1972 Kenneth William Shugg
- 1972–1973 Henry Jardine Parkinson
- 1973–1974 Robert Peter McIntyre
- 1974–1975 Harold Bryce Mortlock AM
- 1975–1976 Blair Mansfield Wilson
- 1976–1977 Eustace Gresley Cohen
- 1977–1978 John Davidson
- 1978–1979 Geoffrey Lawrence Lumsdaine
- 1979–1980 Alexander Ian Ferrier
- 1980–1981 Michael Laurence Peck
- 1981–1982 Peter Johnson AC
- 1982–1983 David Allan Nutter
- 1983–1984 Richard Melville Young
- 1984–1985 Roland David Jackson
- 1985–1986 Graham Alan Hume
- 1986–1987 Robert Darwin Hall
- 1988–1989 Dudley Keith Wilde
- 1989–1990 Ronald Barrie Bodycoat
- 1990–1991 Robert Lindsay Caulfield
- 1991–1992 Jamieson Sayer Allom
- 1992–1993 Robert Denyer Cheesman
- 1993–1994 James Taylor
- 1994–1995 Louise Cox AO
- 1995–1996 Peter Robertson Gargett
- 1996–1997 John Stanley Castles
- 1997–1998 Eric Graham Butt
- 1998–1999 Graham Humphries
- 1999–2000 Nigel Warren Shaw
- 2000–2001 Edward Robert Haysom
- 2001–2003 Graham Jahn AM
- 2003–2004 David John Parken
- 2004–2005 Warren Merton Kerr
- 2005–2006 Bob Nation
- 2006–2007 Carey Lyon
- 2007–2008 Alec Tzannes AM
- 2008–2009 Howard Tanner
- 2009–2010 Melinda Dodson
- 2010–2011 Karl Fender
- 2011–2012 Brian Zulaikha
- 2012–2013 Shelley Penn AM
- 2013–2014 Paul Berkemeier
- 2014–2015 David Karotkin
- 2015–2016 Jon Clements
- 2016–2017 Ken Maher AO
- 2017–2018 Richard Kirk
- 2018–2019 Clare Cousins
- 2019–2020 Helen Lochhead AO
- 2020–2021 Alice Hampson
- 2021–2022 Tony Giannone
- 2022–2023 Shannon Battisson
- 2023–2024 Stuart Tanner
- 2024–2025 Jane Cassidy
- 2025–2026 Adam Haddow
- 2026–2027 David Wagner
- 2027– Ross Donaldson (president elect)

== State and territory chapter presidents ==
=== Australian Capital Territory ===
==== ACT Chapter established 1962 ====
Sources:

- 1962–1964 Malcolm Moir
- 1964–1966 John Scollay
- 1966–1968 Peter Harrison
- 1968–1970 John Goldsmith
- 1970–1972 Horrie Holt
- 1972–1974 Arthur Tow
- 1974–1976 Neil Renfree
- 1976–1978 Tony Cooper
- 1978–1980 Mervyn Willoughby–Thomas
- 1980–1982 Ian Thompson
- 1982–1984 Geoffrey Butterworth
- 1984–1986 Barry Cameron
- 1986–1988 Rick Butt
- 1988–1990 Alastair Swayn
- 1990–1992 Colin Stewart
- 1992–1993 Peter Freeman
- 1993–1994 Annabelle Pegrum
- 1994–1998 Graham Humphries
- 1998–2000 Dominic Maiuto
- 2000–2002 Colin Stewart
- 2002–2006 Catherine Townsend
- 2006–2008 Melinda Dodson
- 2008–2010 David Flannery
- 2010–2012 Sheila Hughes
- 2012–2014 Tony Trobe
- 2014–2016 Andrew Wilson
- 2016–2018 Rob Henry
- 2018–2020 Philip Leeson
- 2020–2021 Shannon Battisson
- 2021–2023 Jane Cassidy
- 2023–2025 Shoba Cole
- 2026—2027 Nugroho Utomo

=== New South Wales ===
==== NSW Institute of Architects established 1871 ====
- 1871–1878 George Allen Mansfield
- 1878–1889 Thomas Rowe
- 1889–1895 John Horbury Hunt
- 1895–1898 Thomas Rowe
- 1898–1902 John Barlow
- 1902–1903 George Allen Mansfield
- 1903–1905 Cyril Blacket
- 1906–1908 Harry Kent
- 1908–1910 Ernest Alfred Scott
- 1910–1911 George Birrell Robertson
- 1911–1912 John Francis Hennessy
- 1912–1914 George Sydney Jones
- 1914–1916 Arthur William Anderson
- 1916–1919 Arthur Pritchard
- 1919–1919 Charles Henry Slatyer
- 1919–1920 Arthur Pritchard
- 1920–1921 George Sydney Jones
- 1921–1922 George Herbert Godsell
- 1922–1926 Sir Charles Rosenthal
- 1926–1929 Alfred Samuel Hook
- 1929–1931 James Peddle
- 1931–1932 Henry Budden
- 1932–1933 Ernest Alfred Scott

==== NSW Chapter established 1933 ====
- 1933–1934 Leslie Wilkinson OBE
- 1934–1936 Arthur William Anderson
- 1936–1938 Leith Cecil McCredie
- 1938–1940 William Ronald Richardson
- 1940–1942 Samuel George Thorp
- 1942–1944 Cobden Parkes
- 1944–1946 Percy James Gordon
- 1946–1948 Frank William Turner
- 1948–1950 Adrian Ashton
- 1950–1952 Alan Edgecliff Stafford
- 1952–1954 Eric William Andrew
- 1954–1956 Geoffrey Lewis Moline
- 1956–1960 Max Ernest Collard
- 1960–1962 Albert Henry Alfred Hanson
- 1962–1964 Cyril John Farrington
- 1964–1966 Ronald Andrew Gilling
- 1966–1970 Peter Johnson AC
- 1970–1972 Bryce Mortlock
- 1972–1974 Geoffrey Lumsdaine
- 1974–1976 J. Fisher
- 1976–1978 Eric Daniels
- 1978–1980 Geoffrey Lumsdaine
- 1980–1982 Martyn David Chapman
- 1982–1984 Chris Johnson AO
- 1984–1986 Kevin Rice
- 1986–1988 Lawrence Nield
- 1988–1990 Louise Cox AO
- 1990–1992 Richard Dinham
- 1992–1994 John Richardson
- 1994–1996 John Bilmon
- 1996–2000 David Brown
- 2000–2002 Graham Jahn AM
- 2002–2004 Caroline Pidcock
- 2004–2008 Deborah Dearing
- 2008–2011 Brian Zulaikha
- 2011–2013 Matthew Pullinger
- 2013–2015 Joe Agius
- 2015–2017 Shaun Carter
- 2017–2019 Andrew Nimmo
- 2019–2021 Kathlyn Loseby
- 2021–2023 Laura Cockburn
- 2023–2024 Adam Haddow
- 2025 Elizabeth Carpenter

=== Northern Territory ===
- Steven Huntingford
- 2010—2014 Richard Layton
- 2014—2016 Simon Scally
- 2016—2018 Andrew Broffman
- 2018—2022 Jenny Culgan
- 2022—2023 Rossi Kouronis
- 2024 Vacant

=== Queensland ===
==== Queensland Institute of Architects established 1888 ====
- 1888 Francis Drummond Greville Stanley
- 1918–1919 George Brockwell Gill
- 1923–1924 Thomas Blair Moncrieff Wightman
- 1927–1931 Lange Powell

==== Queensland Chapter established 1930 ====
- 2018—2020 Mark Jones
- 2020—2022 Michael Lavery
- 2022—2024 Amy Degenhart
- 2024—2026 Russell Hall
- 2026—2028 Peter Gardiner

=== South Australia ===
- 1960–1962 Gavin Walkley
- 2020–2021 Tony Giannone
- 2021–2022 Anthony Coupe
- 2022–2023 Chris Morley
- 2024–2026 Kirstie Coultas

=== Tasmania ===
==== Founded 1903 ====
- 1952—1954 Sydney Wallace Thomas Blythe
- 2011 Karen Davis
- 2017—2019 Yvette Breytenbach
- 2020—2021 Shamus Mulcahy
- 2021 Craig Rosevear
- 2022 Stuart Tanner
- 2023 Megan Baines
- 2024—2026 Daniel Lane

=== Victoria ===
==== Victorian Institute of Architects (VIA), founded 21 August 1856 ====
- 1856–1861 John George Knight
- 1861–1865 John Gill
- 1871–1874 Joseph Reed
- 1874–1881 Sir Redmond Barry
- 1881–1882 George Wharton
- 1882–1884 Charles Webb
- 1884–1985 Nathaniel Billing
- 1885–1886 Thomas Watts
- 1886–1887 Lloyd Tayler
- 1887–1888 Alfred Purchas
- 1888–1889 Sir George Verdon
- 1889–1890 Lloyd Tayler
- 1890–1892 George Charles Inskip
- 1892–1893 Percy Oakden
- 1893–1895 Arthur Ebden Johnson
- 1895–1897 Percy Oakden
- 1897–1899 Anketell Matthew Henderson
- 1899–1901 Lloyd Tayler

==== Royal Victorian Institute of Architects (RVIA) ====
- 1901–1902 Percy Oakden
- 1902–1903 Thomas Watts
- 1903–1905 John Augustus Bernhard Koch
- 1905–1907 Charles D'Ebro
- 1907–1908 Francis Joseph Smart
- 1908–1910 Edward Albert Bates
- 1910–1911 Anketell Matthew Henderson
- 1911–1913 Gerard Wight
- 1913–1914 Anketell Matthew Henderson
- 1914–1916 Henry William Tompkins
- 1916–1918 William Arthur Mordey Blackett
- 1918–1919 Arthur Peck
- 1919–1921 Frank Stapley
- 1921–1923 Kingsley Anketell Henderson
- 1923–1924 William Scott Purves Godfrey
- 1924–1926 Philip Burgoyne Hudson
- 1926–1928 Percy Allport Oakley
- 1928–1930 William Arthur Mordey Blackett
- 1930–1931 Thomas Johnstone Buchan
- 1931–1933 Leighton Francis Irwin
- 1933–1935 Charles Edward Serpell
- 1935–1937 Frederick Louis Klingender
- 1937–1939 Alec Stanley Eggleston
- 1939–1941 Leslie Marsh Perrott
- 1941–1942 Sir Walter Osborn McCutcheon KT
- 1942–1945 John Francis Deighton Scarborough
- 1945–1947 Robert Snowden Demaine
- 1947–1949 William Purves Race Godfrey OBE TD
- 1949–1951 Eric Keith Mackay OBE
- 1951–1953 Eric Hughes
- 1952–1955 William Balcombe Griffiths OBE MC ED
- 1955–1957 Harry Stephen Winbush
- 1957–1959 Raymond Berg
- 1959–1961 Professor Brian Bannatyne Lewis
- 1961–1963 Acheson Best Overend MBE
- 1963–1965 David Fisher
- 1965–1966 Stanley Maurice Charles Evans
- 1966 Ronald Grant Lyon AM

==== Royal Australian Institute of Architects (RAIA), Victorian Chapter ====
- 1966–1967 Ronald Grant Lyon AM
- 1968–1969 Lloyd Emerson Albert Orton
- 1969–1970 Robert Peter McIntyre AO
- 1971 Robin Penleigh Boyd CBE
- 1972 Reginald Edward Grouse DFC
- 1973–1974 John David Gates
- 1975–1976 Neil Clerehan
- 1977–1978 Richard Melville Young AM
- 1978–1980 Neil Thomas Edward Montgomery
- 1980–1982 James Heward Earle AM
- 1982–1984 John Perrin Alsop
- 1984–1986 Dimity Alexandria Reed AM
- 1986–1988 Charles Justin
- 1988–1990 William Spiers Corker
- 1990–1992 Stephen Cameron Ashton
- 1992–1994 John Stanley Castles
- 1994–1997 Garry Bruce Marshall
- 1997–2000 James Crofts Learmonth
- 2000–2002 Ian Lachlan McDougall
- 2002–2004 Elisabetta Maria Giannini
- 2004–2006 Robert Alan Stent
- 2006–2008 Philip James Goad
- 2008–2010 Karl Arthur Fender
- 2010–2012 Robert Paul Puksand
- 2012–2014 Jonathan William Clements
- 2014–2016 Peter Francis Malatt
- 2016–2018 Vanessa Bird
- 2018–2020 Amy Muir
- 2020–2022 Bill Krotiris
- 2022–2024 David Wagner
- 2025–2027 Stephanie Bullock

=== Western Australia ===
==== Western Australian Institute of Architects (WAIA) ====
- 1896—1898 George Thomas Temple–Poole
- 1898—1900 Michael Francis Cavanagh
- 1900—1902 George Thomas Temple–Poole
- 1903—1905 Michael Francis Cavanagh
- 1905—1907 George Thomas Temple–Poole
- 1908—1909 Percy William Harrison
- 1909—1911 Joseph John Talbot Hobbs
- 1911—1913 Joseph John Talbot Hobbs
- 1913—1915 George Thomas Temple–Poole
- 1915—1917 Michael Francis Cavanagh
- 1917—1919 Joseph Herbert Eales
- 1919—1921 Alfred Robert Linus Wright

==== Royal Institute of Architects of Western Australia (RIAWA) ====
- 1921—1922 Alfred Robert Linus Wright
- 1922—1923 Jack Learmonth Ochiltree
- 1923—1924 Alfred Robert Linus Wright
- 1924—1925 Eustace Gresley Cohen
- 1926—1927 Alfred Robert Linus Wright
- 1928—1929 Joseph Francis Allen
- 1930—1931 Edgar Le Blond Henderson
- 1932—1933 Joseph Francis Allen
- 1933—1934 Walter James Waldie Forbes
- 1935—1936 Alexander Donald Cameron
- 1937—1938 Reginald Summerhayes
- 1938—1940 Kenneth Charles Duncan
- 1940—1941 George Herbert Parry
- 1942—1943 Albert Ernest (Paddy) Clare

==== Royal Australian Institute of Architects, WA Chapter (RAIA WA) ====
- 1943—1944 Albert Ernest (Paddy) Clare
- 1945—1946 Alexander Barr Winning
- 1947—1948 William Allan McInnes Green
- 1949—1950 John Berkeley Fitzhardinge
- 1951—1952 William Thomas Leighton
- 1953—1954 Oswald Victor Chisholm
- 1955—1956 Kenneth Charles Duncan
- 1957—1958 Marshall Walter Gervase Clifton
- 1959—1960 Desmond Ossiter Sands
- 1961—1962 Mervyn Henry Parry
- 1963—1964 William Thomas Leighton
- 1965—1966 Gordon William Finn
- 1967—1968 Geoffrey Edwin Summerhayes
- 1969—1970 Richard Morris Fairbrother
- 1971—1972 Eustace Gresley Cohen
- 1973—1974 John Kenneth Duncan
- 1975—1976 Peter John Grigg
- 1977—1978 Antonio Carmelo (Tony) De Leo
- 1979—1980 John A. Pickering
- 1981—1982 Ronald Barrie Bodycoat
- 1983—1984 Laurie William Hegvold
- 1985—1986 Max Rodney Hardman
- 1987—1988 James Taylor
- 1989—1990 Brian Frederic Charles Wright
- 1991—1992 Peter Shaw Parkinson
- 1993—1994 Gregory Francis Hamilton Howlett
- 1995—1996 Geoffrey Leslie London
- 1997—1998 Nigel Warren Shaw
- 1999—2000 Haralds Gunter (Harry) Schubert
- 2001—2004 Warren Merton Kerr
- 2004—2005 Patrick Maurice Pinder
- 2005—2007 Ian Henry Dewar
- 2007—2011 Rodney David Mollett
- 2011—2014 David John Knox Karotkin
- 2014—2017 Philip John Griffiths
- 2017—2019 Suzanne Jane Hunt
- 2019—2021 Peter Charles Athol Hobbs
- 2021—2023 Sandy Michelle Anghie
- 2023—2025 Ross Donaldson
- 2025—2026 Fred Chaney

== EmAGN Presidents ==
The Emerging Architects and Graduates Network (EmAGN) of the AIA has elected a president since 2013.

- 2013 Anthony Balsamo
- 2014 Jacqui Connor
- 2015 Rob Henry
- 2016—2017 Ksenia Totoeva
- 2018—2019 Thom Mackenzie
- 2020—2021 Erin Crowden
- 2022—2023 Tiffany Liew
- 2024—2025 Liehan Janse van Rensburg
- 2025—2026 Callum Senjov
- 2026—2027 Candice Halliday

== Australian Building Industry Contracts (ABIC) ==
The Australian Institute of Architects, in conjunction with Master Builders Australia (MBA), jointly publishes the Australian Building Industry Contracts (ABIC). These contracts are designed specifically to be administered by an architect. They are structured to allocate risk fairly, provide clear administrative mechanisms, and foster a non-adversarial relationship between the building owner and the contractor.

=== Types of ABIC contracts ===
ABIC Contracts are categorised based on the complexity, scale and specific regulatory requirements of a project. The primary suites include:

- Major Works (MW): Intended for large, complex commercial or non-residential projects requiring comprehensive administrative oversight.
- Simple Works (SW): Designed for medium-sized commercial or non-residential projects that require less complex contract administration.
- Basic Works (BW): Utilised for small, straightforward projects with minimal risk and simple execution requirements.
- Housing (H): Tailored specifically for domestic residential building projects. Because residential construction is heavily regulated at the state level in Australia, these contracts come in state-specific variations to comply with local housing legislation.
- Early Works (EW): Used for preliminary on-site activities, such as demolition, excavation, or site preparation, prior to the main construction contract being awarded and executed.

=== Gaps and special conditions ===
While ABIC contracts provide a standardised legal framework, they are 'off-the-shelf' documents that cannot predict the unique variables of every site, client, or regulatory environment. The complexity of modern construction has increasingly exposed these gaps, particularly in the wake of the COVID-19 pandemic, which highlighted the necessity for robust mechanisms to handle sudden supply chain issues and force majeure events.

Historically, project-specific amendments, known as Special Conditions, were frequently drafted by non-legal professionals. These poorly drafted modifications led to recurring errors that contradicted core contract clauses or disrupted the architect's administrative powers, the Institute and supporting bodies like the Association of Consulting Architects (ACA sought to formalise legal advisory support.

Consequently, tailored Special Conditions were developed to resolve these industry-wide drafting issues and provide architects with a legally reliable framework. A comprehensive suite of these architect-specific clauses was authored by Christopher Larcos, FRAIA of Larcos Law, this closed the gap between architectural practice and construction law for these risk areas.

In response, these special conditions are designed to address contemporary industry challenges, such as formalising monthly progress payments, managing material delays and modernising force majeure clauses. This fundamentally ensured the overarching contract remains legally sound and enforceable.

To ensure the ongoing relevance and legal compliance of the ABIC suite, the Australian Institute of Architects and Master Builders Australia periodically review and update the standard contracts. These updates account for changes in the National Construction Code (NCC), evolving state-based building legislation and broader industry trends.

The Institute provides ongoing continuing professional development (CPD) and practice notes to its members. This educational support ensures that practicing architects remain equipped to properly administer the baseline contracts, integrate appropriately drafted special conditions and manage complex construction projects effectively.

== Publications ==
Since 1904 the Institute has published a regular periodical magazine, now known as Architecture Australia. Each state chapter has also published local periodicals reporting on chapter business, local architecture, events and news.

== Coat of arms ==
Coat of arms of the Royal Australian Institute of Architects
Notes In May 1953, the Federal Executive Council of RAIA resolved to seek the design of a coat of arms. The final design was Granted by the Kings of Arms, of the College of Arms. Adopted 28 September 1956 Escutcheon Per fesse Azure and Or masoned Sable, issuant from the fesse point a rising Sun Gold, overall an Ionic Column Gules. Supporters On either side a Kangaroo proper, collard and chained Or. Compartment A field of Grass Vert. Symbolism In 1927 the Federal Council of Australian Institutes of Architects adopted a design for the seal of the proposed Federal Institute by two Tasmanian architects, Alan Cameron Walker and Archibald Thomas Johnston, that was based upon the seal of the Royal Institute of British Architects, using kangaroos instead of lions and a rising sun in the shield. The coat of arms granted by the College of Arms in 1956 was based upon this seal, as have all subsequent institute logos and badges, with the most recent version of the logo adopted in 2008. The Latin motto was originally adopted at the suggestion of Victorian architect, William Arthur Mordey Blackett, at the 1928 Conference of the Federal Council of Australian Institutes of Architects, which discussed the establishment of the federal institute, with the motto's original translation given as "We advance our Art together". In a 1951 edition of the Institute Journal, Architecture, the RAIA President, Cobden Parkes, explained further on the motto and its meaning: The Institute motto, "Artem promovemus una", literally translated, means something like "Together we advance the profession". More subjectively it is construed in the first tenet of the Memorandum of Association of the Institute as "the advancement of architecture"; for when it speaks of a profession, our motto obviously means that of architecture.
