= Mary Dunne (scientist) =

Australian scientist and Sister of Mercy (1926–2020)

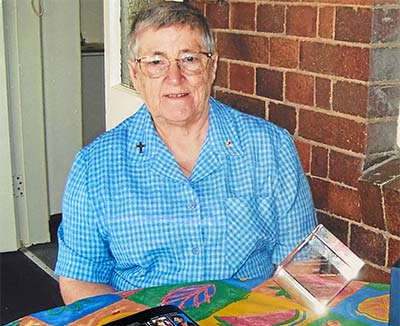
Sister Regis Mary Dunne, nun and biochemist

Sister Regis Mary Dunne AO RSM (9 November 1926 – 20 April 2020) was an Australian scientist and Sister of Mercy, considered to be a pioneer in the field of genetics and bioethics.

== Early life and education ==
Born in Toowoomba, Queensland, Sister Regis went to St Saviour's Primary School before attending All Hallows' School in Brisbane.

== Career ==
Following her graduation from All Hallows', Sister Regis worked as a teacher specialising in home science, chemistry, physiology and religion.

She entered the Sisters of Mercy at Nudgee as a novitiate in 1946 and made her first religious vows in 1949.

Also in 1949, Sister Regis commenced training as a medical laboratory scientist by studying part-time at the Queensland Institute of Technology while working as a trainee biochemist at the Mater Hospital. She graduated from the Association of Medical Laboratory Technologists with a diploma in 1953.

Sister Regis then worked in the haematology field, pioneering a procedure for chromosome analysis, leading to her establishing Queensland's first cytogenetics diagnostic laboratory at the Mater Hospital in 1960.

In 1961, she co-founded the first Australian genetic counselling clinic with Neville Anderson to assist medical professionals and patients with genetic diagnoses.

She became the founding director of the state's first bioethics centre in 1981, a role she held until 1994. This centre offered free access to a library of bioethical information which was used by professionals, organisations and members of the public. A pioneer in the field of women in science, technology, engineering and mathematics (STEM), Dunne has made a lifetime and ground-breaking contribution to global science, healthcare and ethics, inspiring many young scientists, researchers, students and healthcare professionals.

== Recognition ==
In 1983, Sister Regis was awarded Honorary Emeritus membership to the Human Genetics Society of Australasia in recognition of her contribution to the field of genetics.

In the 2007 Queen's Birthday Honours, Sister Regis was made an Officer of the Order of Australia for her service to medicine through her promotion and support of bioethics in medical research and for her genetics research. Also that year, her work was recognised at the National Health and Medical Research Council Awards for Excellence in Health and Medical Research where she was presented with an Outstanding Contribution Award.

== Death and legacy ==
Sister Regis died on 20 April 2020, prompting a number of tributes from the medical and scientific community.

In 2021, she was posthumously named as a Queensland Great.
