= Melinda Dodson =

Australian architect

Melinda Dodson is an Australian architect and the youngest National President of Australian Institute of Architects (RAIA) when appointed in 2009. Her works focuses on the development of sustainable architecture, fostering architecture community and institution, and effective project partnership. As the second female President of RAIA, Dodson also worked on supporting emerging and female architects as one of the priorities during the first 12 months of her appointment.

Dodson graduated from the University of Adelaide with an honours degree in architecture. Over the next 15 years, she worked for architectural practices in Adelaide and Canberra, including Daryl Jackson Alastair Swayn and the GHD Group. She started her own firm, Melinda Dodson Architects (MDa), which won the New Experimental Architectural Typologies (NEAT) housing competition sponsored by the ACT Government. Taking consideration of people who previously lived in compact houses, her award-winning housing design provides HI-lo housing with communal gardens on the upper level and flexible layout on the lower level for single living.

Some other achievements that has been awarded to Dodson are 2005 Australian Institute of Architects ACT Young Architect Prize, Instyle Design Award 2010, and 2013 National Association of Women in Construction (NAWIC) Outstanding Achievement in Construction Award ACT.
