= Operation Ramp =

Operation Ramp was the name given to an Australian Defence Force (ADF) operation to support the evacuation of over 5,300 Australians and over 1,300 foreign nationals from the Lebanese ports of Beirut and Tyre during the 2006 Lebanon War. The evacuation was led by the Australian Department of Foreign Affairs and Trade (DFAT). The ADF deployed an advance party on 19 July 2006 and a full Joint Task Force 36 hours later. The task force and supporting staff consisted of 120 personnel deployed to Lebanon, Cyprus, and Turkey as well as additional staffing at a DFAT crisis center in Canberra.

ADF personnel were progressively withdrawn from Lebanon with all personnel home by 25 August 2006.

The Australian Federal Police (AFP) deployed both AFP and Victoria Police personnel on secondment to the AFP, who were performing peacekeeping duties in Cyprus. They entered Lebanon on ten occasions between 19 and 24 July coordinating the evacuation of the citizens. All the police members volunteered and did so whilst 'off duty'. Those members received an AFP Commissioner Citation for Hazardous Overseas Service.

== See also ==
- International reactions to the 2006 Lebanon War by evacuations and aid
