= Annabelle Pegrum =

Annabelle Nicole Pegrum AM, LFRAIA (born 7 November 1952) is an Australian architect, former public servant and academic.

The daughter of Wilibald and Elisabeth Rodowicz, she was born Annabelle Nicole Rodowicz in Junee, New South Wales. She was educated at Holy Cross College in Woollahra and went on to earn two degrees bachelor of science in architecture and bachelor of architecture (first class honours) from the University of Sydney. On graduation, she received the Leslie Wilkinson Prize in Architectural History and Theory and subsequently entered private practice as an architect.

Annabelle came to Canberra in 1980 and began teaching in architecture and design at the Canberra College of Advanced Education. She later worked for the National Capital Development Commission (later the National Capital Authority). In 1986, she took a tenured academic position at the University of Canberra. In 1990, she rejoined the Australian Capital Territory (ACT) public service, where she initially worked as architect and town planner and then held senior executive positions including General Manager of City Operations, Executive Director of the Cabinet and Policy Co-ordination Office in the Chief Minister's Department and finally Chief Executive of the Department of Business, the Arts, Sport and Tourism ACT. From 1998 to 2008, she was Chief Executive of the National Capital Authority the Commonwealth statutory agency responsible for the planning, development and enhancement of Canberra as the National Capital. In 2008, she was named a Professorial Fellow at the University of Canberra; she also served as University architect. From 2012 - 2018 she was a Commissioner with the NSW Independent Planning Commission and is a Director of Pegrum and Associates architects and planners. She is a members of the ACT and of the Western Australian State design review panels. She is a graduate of the Australian Institute of Company Directors and serves on a number of Boards including the Council of the University of Canberra (from 2018-2021), investLogan in Queensland, the Alastair Swayn Foundation, the Swayn Gallery of Australian Design and the Canberra Symphony Orchestra.

Pegrum is a Life Fellow of the Royal Australian Institute of Architects (FRAIA) and has served as president of the ACT Chapter. In 1998, she was named Telstra ACT Business Woman of the Year.

She was appointed Member of the Order of Australia in the 2007 Queen's Birthday Honours.
