= Kenneth Charles Duncan =

Australian architect

- Born: April 13, 1898; Fremantle, Western Australia
- Died: October 1, 1983 (aged 85); Nedlands, Western Australia
- Occupation: modernist architect
- Years active: 1920–1973

Kenneth Charles Duncan (1898–1983) was an Australian modernist architect, active from before World War I until the 1970s making a long and valued contribution to architectural practice especially in Western Australia.

== Education ==
In 1912, while attending the Midland Junction Central School, Duncan was placed 21st in the State elementary schools bursaries examination conducted by the Education Department of Western Australia with a £10 bursary received as a result; this was of great assistance to his parents. Duncan passed his Junior Public Examination at Perth Modern School in late 1913. In 1914 he showed an aptitude for drawing and enrolled at the Joseph Francis Allen School (1869–1933) at Fremantle. He also studied at Perth Technical College before enlisting to serve in World War I, in 1917. In 1919 he served overseas in France and Belgium with the Australian Imperial Forces. In 1915 he joined the Volunteer Fire Brigade at Guildford and was a supporter of the WA Fire Brigades’ association, serving for ten years as secretary and was made a life member.

== Work ==
Duncan worked with the War Service Homes Commission from July 1921 and successfully produced suburban housing projects in the Perth metropolitan area with his partner Christian Holger Jensen (c.1889–1950). When Jensen was declared bankrupt in January 1925, the architectural partnership was dissolved. Duncan then formed an architectural partnership with Cyril James Stephen (1893–1974). Following the outbreak of World War II in 1941, Duncan enlisted in the Royal Australian Engineers. In 1946, Duncan was discharged from the Australian Army and two years later, Duncan and Stephen were joined in practice by John Duart Mercer (1923–1988); the firm became known as Duncan Stephen and Mercer. Duncan's son, John Kenneth Duncan (1928-2005) also became an architect of renown in WA, came into the business in 1956. Duncan Stephen & Mercer designed over 70 fire stations all over Western Australia.

== Professional involvement ==
Kenneth C. Duncan was president of the Institute of Architects of Western Australia during 1939—1940. Except for four years during the Second World War, Duncan was a member of the Architects Board of Western Australia for thirty-one years, 1938—1969, and its chairman during 1962—1967. He was President of the RAIA (WA) 1954—1956 and the first West Australian to become National President of the Royal Australian Institute of Architects in 1959.

== Retirement and later years ==
In 1973, Duncan retired from practice because of his failing eyesight and 10 years later he died 1 October 1983 at the Repatriation Hospital in Hollywood.
