= 2003 in professional wrestling =

2003 in professional wrestling describes the year's events in the world of professional wrestling.

== List of notable promotions ==
These promotions held notable events in 2003.

| Promotion Name | Abbreviation | Notes |
|---|---|---|
| Consejo Mundial de Lucha Libre | CMLL | |
| Lucha Libre AAA Worldwide | AAA | The "AAA" abbreviation has been used since the mid-1990s and had previously stood for the promotion's original name Asistencia Asesoría y Administración. |
| New Japan Pro-Wrestling | NJPW | |
| Pro Wrestling Iron | PWI | |
| Ring of Honor | ROH | |
| World Japan Pro Wrestling | WJ | |
| World Wrestling All-Stars | WWA | |
| World Wrestling Council | WWC | |
| World Wrestling Entertainment | WWE | WWE divided its roster into two storyline divisions, Raw and SmackDown!, referred to as brands, where wrestlers exclusively performed on their respective weekly television programs. |

== Calendar of notable shows ==
=== January ===
| Date | Promotion(s) | Event | Location | Main Event |
|---|---|---|---|---|
| January 4 | NJPW | Wrestling World | Tokyo, Japan | Yuji Nagata (c) defeated Josh Barnett in a Singles match for the IWGP Heavyweight Championship |
| January 19 | WWE: Raw; SmackDown! | Royal Rumble | Boston, Massachusetts | Brock Lesnar won by last eliminating The Undertaker in a 30-man Royal Rumble match for a world championship match at Wrestlemania XIX |
(c) – denotes defending champion(s)

=== February ===
| Date | Promotion(s) | Event | Location | Main Event |
|---|---|---|---|---|
| February 8 | ROH | One Year Anniversary Show | Queens, New York | Da Hit Squad (Mafia and Monsta Mack), Divine Storm (Chris Divine and Quiet Storm), The S.A.T. (Jose and Joel Maximo) and Mikey Whipwreck defeated Special K (Angel Dust, Brian XL, Deranged, Dixie, Hydro, Izzy, Jody Fleisch, Slim J, Slugger and Yeyo) in a Handicap Scramble match |
| February 23 | WWE: Raw; SmackDown! | No Way Out | Montreal, Quebec | The Rock defeated Hulk Hogan in a Singles match |
(c) – denotes defending champion(s)

=== March ===
| Date | Promotion(s) | Event | Location | Main Event |
|---|---|---|---|---|
| March 1 | WJ | WJ MAGMA01 | Tokyo, Japan | Riki Choshu defeated Genichiro Tenryu at the first World Japan event |
| March 16 | AAA | Rey de Reyes | Zapopan, Jalisco, Mexico | La Parka Jr. defeated Abismo Negro in a 2003 Rey de Reyes tournament final |
| March 30 | WWE: Raw; SmackDown! | WrestleMania XIX | Seattle, Washington | Brock Lesnar defeated Kurt Angle (c) in a Singles match for the WWE Championship |
(c) – denotes defending champion(s)

=== April ===
| Date | Promotion(s) | Event | Location | Main Event |
|---|---|---|---|---|
| April 4 | CMLL | 47. Aniversario de Arena México | Mexico City, Mexico | Shocker defeated Vampiro Canadiense in a Best two-out-of-three falls Lucha de Apuestas hair vs. hair match |
| April 27 | WWE: Raw; SmackDown! | Backlash | Worcester, Massachusetts | Goldberg defeated The Rock in a Singles match |
(c) – denotes defending champion(s)

=== May ===
| Date | Promotion(s) | Event | Location | Main Event |
|---|---|---|---|---|
| May 9 | CMLL | International Gran Prix | Mexico City, Mexico | Brazo de Plata, Cien Caras, and Gran Markus Jr. defeated Los Boricuas (Pierroth Jr., Sadam, and Violencia) in a Best two-out-of-three falls six-man tag team match |
| May 18 | WWE: Raw; SmackDown! | Judgment Day | Charlotte, North Carolina | Brock Lesnar (c) defeated Big Show in a Stretcher match for the WWE Championship |
| May 25 | WWA | The Reckoning | Auckland, New Zealand | Jeff Jarrett (NWA World Heavyweight Champion) defeated Sting (WWA World Heavyweight Champion) in a Title Unification match to unify the NWA World Heavyweight Championship and the WWA World Heavyweight Championship |
| May 31 | N/A | Second Annual Big Dick Dudley Memorial Show | Franklin Square, New York | Raven defeated Balls Mahoney (c) in a Singles match for the USA Pro Heavyweight Championship |
(c) – denotes defending champion(s)

=== June ===
| Date | Promotion(s) | Event | Location | Main Event |
|---|---|---|---|---|
| June 7 | WWE: Raw | Insurrextion | Newcastle, England | Triple H (c) defeated Kevin Nash in a Street Fight for the World Heavyweight Championship |
| June 15 | AAA | Triplemanía XI | Naucalpan, Mexico | Lizmark, La Parka, Octagón and Super Caló defeated Abismo Negro, Cibernético and The Headhunters (Headhunter A and Headhunter B) by disqualification in a Best two-out-of-three falls eight-man "Atómicos" tag team match |
| June 15 | WWE: Raw | Bad Blood | Houston, Texas | Triple H (c) defeated Kevin Nash in a Hell in a Cell match for the World Heavyweight Championship with Mick Foley as special guest referee |
(c) – denotes defending champion(s)

=== July ===
| Date | Promotion(s) | Event | Location | Main Event |
|---|---|---|---|---|
| July 19 | ROH | Death Before Dishonor | Elizabeth, New Jersey | Samoa Joe (c) vs. Paul London for the ROH World Championship |
| July 19 | WWC | WWC 30th Aniversario | Carolina, Puerto Rico | Thunder versus Lightning went to a no contest in a Singles match |
| July 20 | WJ | WJ MAGMA03 | Tokyo | Kensuke Sasaki defeats Kenzo Suzuki in a tournament final for the vacant WMG Heavyweight Title |
| July 27 | WWE: SmackDown! | Vengeance | Denver, Colorado | Kurt Angle defeated Brock Lesnar (c) and Big Show in a Triple Threat match for the WWE Championship |
(c) – denotes defending champion(s)

=== August ===
| Date | Promotion(s) | Event | Location | Main Event |
|---|---|---|---|---|
| August 10–17 | NJPW | G1 Climax | Tokyo | Hiroyoshi Tenzan defeated Jun Akiyama by submission in a G1 Climax tournament final |
| August 24 | WWE: Raw; SmackDown! | SummerSlam | Phoenix, Arizona | Triple H (c) defeated Goldberg, Chris Jericho, Shawn Michaels, Randy Orton, and Kevin Nash in an Elimination Chamber match for the World Heavyweight Championship |
| August 31 | AAA | Verano de Escándalo-A | Monterrey, Mexico | La Parka and Latin Lover defeated Cibernético and Héctor Garza in a tag team match |
(c) – denotes defending champion(s)

=== September ===
| Date | Promotion(s) | Event | Location | Main Event |
|---|---|---|---|---|
| September 16 | AAA | Verano de Escándalo-B | San Luis Potosí, Mexico | La Parka, Latin Lover and Máscara Sagrada defeated Cibernético, Héctor Garza and Juventud Guerrera in a Six-man Lucha Libre rules tag team match |
| September 19 | CMLL | CMLL 70th Anniversary Show | Mexico City, Mexico | Shocker defeated Tarzan Boy in a Best two-out-of-three Lucha de Apuestas hair vs. hair match |
| September 20 | ROH | Glory By Honor II | Philadelphia, Pennsylvania | Samoa Joe (c) vs. Christopher Daniels for the ROH World Championship |
| September 21 | WWE: Raw | Unforgiven | Hershey, Pennsylvania | Goldberg defeated Triple H (c) in a Title vs. Career match for the World Heavyweight Championship |
| September 28 | AAA | Verano de Escándalo-C | Guadalajara, Mexico | La Parka defeated Cibernético in a Street Fight |
(c) – denotes defending champion(s)

=== October ===
| Date | Promotion(s) | Event | Location | Main Event |
|---|---|---|---|---|
| October 19 | WWE: SmackDown! | No Mercy | Baltimore, Maryland | Brock Lesnar (c) defeated The Undertaker in a Biker Chain match for the WWE Championship |
(c) – denotes defending champion(s)

=== November ===
| Date | Promotion(s) | Event | Location | Main Event |
|---|---|---|---|---|
| November 15 | PWI | Mike Lockwood Memorial Show | Lathrop, California | Donovan Morgan, Frank Murdoch and Vinny Massaro defeated Hook Bomberry and the Thomaselli Brothers (Vito and Sal Thomaselli) in a Six-man tag team match |
| November 16 | WWE: Raw; SmackDown! | Survivor Series | Dallas, Texas | Goldberg (c) defeated Triple H in a Singles match for the World Heavyweight Championship |
| November 30 | AAA | Guerra de Titanes | Veracruz, Mexico | Latin Lover and Michael Shane defeated Mr. Aguila and David Young in a Final tag team match in the Televisa Tag Team Tournament |
(c) – denotes defending champion(s)

=== December ===
| Date | Promotion(s) | Event | Location | Main Event |
|---|---|---|---|---|
| December 5 | CMLL | Sin Piedad | Mexico City, Mexico | Universo 2000 defeated Pierroth Jr. in a Best two-out-of-three falls Lucha de Apuesta hair vs. hair match |
| December 14 | WWE: Raw | Armageddon | Orlando, Florida | Triple H defeated Goldberg (c) and Kane in a Triple threat match for the World Heavyweight Championship |
| December 25 | WWE: SmackDown! | Tribute to the Troops | Baghdad, Iraq | John Cena defeated Big Show in a Singles match |
| December 27 | ROH | Final Battle | Philadelphia, Pennsylvania | The Prophecy (Christopher Daniels and Dan Maff) vs. The Great Muta and Arashi |
(c) – denotes defending champion(s)

== Accomplishments and tournaments ==
=== AAA ===
| Accomplishment | Winner | Date won | Notes |
|---|---|---|---|
| Rey de Reyes | La Parka Jr. | March 16 | |

=== AJW ===
| Accomplishment | Winner | Date won | Notes |
|---|---|---|---|
| Japan Grand Prix 2003 | Amazing Kong | August 3 | |
| Tag League The Best 2003 | Ayako Hamada and Nanae Takahashi | December 23 | |

=== AJPW ===
| Accomplishment | Winner | Date won | Notes |
|---|---|---|---|
| Champion Carnival 2003 | Satoshi Kojima | March 28 | |
| Junior Heavyweight Champion Carnival | Carl Malenko | April 10 | |
| World's Strongest Determination League 2003 | Justin Credible and Jamal | December 2 | |

=== Ring of Honor ===
| Accomplishment | Winner | Date won | Notes |
|---|---|---|---|
| Field of Honor | Matt Stryker | December 27 | |

=== TNA ===
| Accomplishment | Winner | Date won | Notes |
|---|---|---|---|
| TNA Hard 10 Tournament | The Sandman | | |
| TNA Anarchy Alliance Tag Team Tournament | America's Most Wanted (Chris Harris and James Storm) | June 11 | |
| 2003 TNA Super X Cup Tournament | Chris Sabin | September 3 | |

==== TNA Year End Awards ====
| Poll | Winner(s) |
|---|---|
| Tag Team of the Year | America's Most Wanted (Chris Harris and James Storm) |
| Babe of the Year | Trinity |
| Finisher of the Year | The Styles Clash |
| Who To Watch in 2004 | Abyss |
| Memorable Moment of the Year | Jeff Jarrett attacks Hulk Hogan in Japan |
| X Division Star of the Year | Matt Bentley |
| Match of the Year | The first ever Ultimate X Match |
| Mr. TNA | A.J. Styles |

=== World Japan ===
| Accomplishment | Winner | Date won | Notes |
|---|---|---|---|
| WJ Strongest Tournament | Kensuke Sasaki | July 20 | |
| WMG Tag Team Title Tournament | Genichiro Tenryu and Riki Choshu | August 21 | |
| WMJ Young Magma Cup | Tomohiro Ishii | August 13 | |

=== WWE ===
| Accomplishment | Winner | Date won | Notes |
|---|---|---|---|
| Royal Rumble | Brock Lesnar | January 19 | Winner received a match for their own brand's world championship at WrestleMania XIX—either Raw's World Heavyweight Championship or SmackDown's WWE Championship. Lesnar from SmackDown last eliminated The Undertaker to win a match for the WWE Championship, which he subsequently won from Kurt Angle. |
| WWE Championship #1 Contender's Tournament | John Cena | April 15 | Defeated Chris Benoit in the tournament final to win a match for the WWE Championship at Backlash, but was unsuccessful against Brock Lesnar. |
| WWE United States Championship Tournament | Eddie Guerrero | July 27 | Defeated Chris Benoit in the tournament final to win the reinstated United States Championship, which was previously a World Championship Wrestling title; the title was deactivated in 2001 when it was unified with the Intercontinental Championship at that year's Survivor Series. |

== Awards and honors ==
=== Pro Wrestling Illustrated ===
| Category | Winner |
|---|---|
| PWI Wrestler of the Year | Kurt Angle |
| PWI Tag Team of the Year | The World's Greatest Tag Team (Charlie Haas and Shelton Benjamin) |
| PWI Match of the Year | Kurt Angle vs. Brock Lesnar (SmackDown!, September 16) |
| PWI Feud of the Year | Brock Lesnar vs. Kurt Angle |
| PWI Most Popular Wrestler of the Year | Kurt Angle |
| PWI Most Hated Wrestler of the Year | Triple H |
| PWI Comeback of the Year | Kurt Angle |
| PWI Most Improved Wrestler of the Year | John Cena |
| PWI Most Inspirational Wrestler of the Year | Zach Gowen |
| PWI Rookie of the Year | Zach Gowen |
| PWI Woman of the Year | Trish Stratus |
| PWI Lifetime Achievement | Bret Hart |

=== Wrestling Observer Newsletter ===
==== Wrestling Observer Newsletter Hall of Fame ====
Inductee
Chris Benoit
Earl Caddock
Francisco Flores
Shawn Michaels

==== Wrestling Observer Newsletter awards ====
| Category | Winner |
|---|---|
| Wrestler of the Year | Kenta Kobashi |
| Most Outstanding | Kurt Angle |
| Feud of the Year | Kurt Angle vs. Brock Lesnar |
| Tag Team of the Year | Kenta and Naomichi Marufuji |
| Most Improved | Brock Lesnar |
| Best on Interviews | Chris Jericho |

== Title changes ==
=== NJPW ===
IWGP Heavyweight Championship
Incoming champion – Yuji Nagata
| Date | Winner | Event/Show | Note(s) |
| May 2 | Yoshihiro Takayama | Ultimate Crush | |
| November 3 | Hiroyoshi Tenzan | Yokohama Dead Out | |
| December 9 | Shinsuke Nakamura | Battle Final | |

IWGP Tag Team Championship
Incoming champions – Cho-Ten (Hiroyoshi Tenzan and Masahiro Chono)
| Date | Winner | Event/Show | Note(s) |
| June 13 | Hiroshi Tanahashi and Yutaka Yoshie | Crush | |
| December 14 | Hiroyoshi Tenzan and Osamu Nishimura | Battle Final | |

IWGP Junior Heavyweight Championship
Incoming champion – Koji Kanemoto
| Date | Winner | Event/Show | Note(s) |
| April 23 | Tiger Mask | Strong Energy | |
| September 23 | Vacated | N/A | |
| October 13 | Jado | Ultimate Crush | |
| December 14 | Heat | Battle Final | |

IWGP Junior Heavyweight Tag Team Championship
Incoming champions – Tsuyoshi Kikuchi and Yoshinobu Kanemaru
| Date | Winner | Event/Show | Note(s) |
| January 26 | Jushin Thunder Liger and Koji Kanemoto | The First Navigation | |
| November 4 | Vacated | N/A | |
| November 29 | Gedo and Jado | Battle Final | |

=== WWE ===
– Raw
– SmackDown

Raw and SmackDown each had a world championship, a secondary championship, and a tag team championship for male wrestlers. SmackDown also had a title for their cruiserweight wrestlers. There was only one women's championship and it was exclusive to Raw.

World Heavyweight Championship
Incoming champion – Triple H
| Date | Winner | Event/Show | Note(s) |
| September 21 | Goldberg | Unforgiven | Career vs. title match |
| December 14 | Triple H | Armageddon | Triple threat match, also involving Kane. |

WWE Championship
Incoming champion – Kurt Angle
| Date | Winner | Event/Show | Note(s) |
| March 30 | Brock Lesnar | WrestleMania XIX | |
| July 27 | Kurt Angle | Vengeance | Triple threat match, also involving Big Show. |
| September 16 (aired September 18) | Brock Lesnar | SmackDown! | 60-minute Iron Man match. |

WWE Intercontinental Championship
(Title reactivated)
| Date | Winner | Event/Show | Note(s) |
| May 18 | Christian | Judgment Day | Raw Co-General Manager Stone Cold Steve Austin reactivated the title. Christian won the revived title in a battle royal. |
| July 7 | Booker T | Monday Night Raw | |
| August 10 | Christian | House show | |
| September 29 | Rob Van Dam | Monday Night Raw | Ladder match |
| October 27 | Chris Jericho | Monday Night Raw | |
| October 27 | Rob Van Dam | Monday Night Raw | Steel cage match |
| December 14 | Randy Orton | Armageddon | Mick Foley was the special guest referee. |

WWE United States Championship
(Title reactivated)
| Date | Winner | Event/Show | Note(s) |
| July 27 | Eddie Guerrero | Vengeance | Formerly the WCW United States Championship, the title was reactivated as an exclusive title of the SmackDown! brand. Guerrero defeated Chris Benoit in a tournament final for the revived title. |
| October 19 | Big Show | No Mercy | |

WWE Women's Championship
Incoming champion – Victoria
| Date | Winner | Event/Show | Note(s) |
| March 30 | Trish Stratus | WrestleMania XIX | Triple threat match, also involving Jazz. |
| April 27 | Jazz | Backlash | |
| June 30 | Gail Kim | Monday Night Raw | Seven-woman battle royal, also involving Ivory, Jacqueline, Molly Holly, Trish Stratus, and Victoria. |
| July 28 | Molly Holly | Monday Night Raw | |

World Tag Team Championship
Incoming champions – Booker T and Goldust
| Date | Winner | Event/Show | Note(s) |
| January 6 | William Regal and Lance Storm | Monday Night Raw | |
| January 19 | The Dudley Boyz (Bubba Ray and D-Von Dudley) | Royal Rumble | |
| January 20 | William Regal and Lance Storm | Monday Night Raw | |
| March 24 | Vacated | Monday Night Raw | Vacated due to William Regal getting injured. |
| March 24 | Chief Morley and Lance Storm | Monday Night Raw | Morley awarded himself and Storm the titles. |
| March 31 | Kane and Rob Van Dam | Monday Night Raw | Three-way tag team elimination match, also involving The Dudley Boyz. |
| June 15 | La Résistance (René Duprée and Sylvain Grenier) | Bad Blood | |
| September 21 | The Dudley Boyz (Bubba Ray and D-Von Dudley) | Unforgiven | Handicap tables match in which Robért Conway teamed with La Résistance. |
| December 14 | Evolution (Batista and Ric Flair) | Armageddon | Tag team turmoil match, also involving Robért Conway and René Duprée, The Hurricane and Rosey, Mark Jindrak and Garrison Cade, Val Venis and Lance Storm, and Test and Scott Steiner. |

WWE Tag Team Championship
Incoming champions – Los Guerreros (Eddie and Chavo Guerrero Jr.)
| Date | Winner | Event/Show | Note(s) |
| February 4 (aired February 6) | Team Angle (Shelton Benjamin and Charlie Haas) | SmackDown! | |
| May 18 | Eddie Guerrero and Tajiri | Judgment Day | Ladder match. Los Guerreros had invoked their rematch clause, but Chavo Guerrero Jr. got injured prior to the match. Instead of forfeiting, Tajiri replaced Chavo. |
| July 1 (aired July 3) | The World's Greatest Tag Team (Shelton Benjamin and Charlie Haas) | SmackDown! | After Benjamin and Haas lost the titles to Eddie Guerrero and Tajiri, they were "fired" from Team Angle. They then became known as The World's Greatest Tag Team. |
| September 16 (aired September 18) | Los Guerreros (Eddie and Chavo Guerrero Jr.) | SmackDown! | |
| October 21 (aired October 23) | The Basham Brothers (Doug and Danny Basham) | SmackDown! | |

WWE Cruiserweight Championship
Incoming champion – Billy Kidman
| Date | Winner | Event/Show | Note(s) |
| February 23 | Matt Hardy | No Way Out | |
| June 3 (aired June 5) | Rey Mysterio | SmackDown! | |
| September 23 (aired September 25) | Tajiri | SmackDown! | |
| December 30 (aired January 1, 2004) | Rey Mysterio | SmackDown! | |

== Births ==
- January 5 – Sloane Jacobs
- January 23 – Kaho Matsushita
- February 5 - Starboy Charlie
- March 10 – Komomo Minami
- March 27 – Kazuma Sumi
- June 22 – Ema Maishima
- August 3 – Bozilla
- August 30 – Jackson Drake
- September 9 – Thea Hail
- October 13 – Zayda Steel
- December 11 – Kylie Paige
- December 23 – Kikyo Furusawa

== Debuts ==
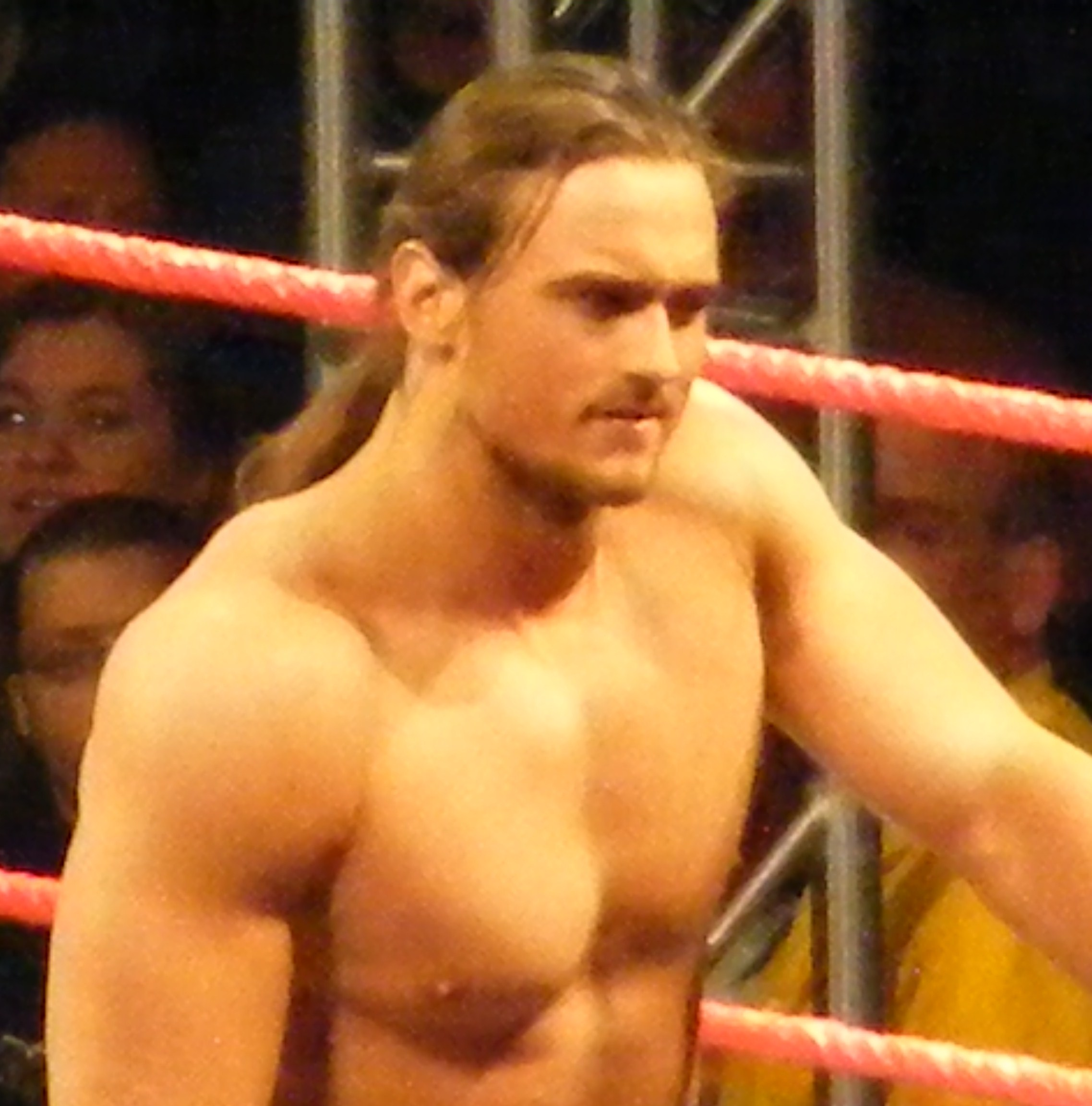
Drew McIntyre

- Uncertain debut date

- Aero Star
- Drew McIntyre
- John Wayne Murdoch

- January 31 – Nobutaka Moribe
- June 26 – Daichi Kakimoto
- February 2 - Hiroshi Nagao
- February 15 - LA Knight
- March 16 - Hiroshi Nagao and Takaya Shibayama
- July 6 - Deborah K
- July 7 - Kuniyoshi Wada
- July 20 - Kyoko Kimura
- August 1 – Mike Mizanin
- August 2 – Mickie Knuckles
- September 17 - TAMURA
- October 3 - Andrade El Idolo
- October 11 - Ricochet
- December 14 - Yuya Susumu, Juri Ogawa and Yumiko Kawada

== Retirements ==
- Steve Austin (1989–March 2003) (returned to wrestle at Wrestlemania 38)
- Bruce Hart (1972–2003)
- Brian Adams (1986–January 2003)
- Eric Angle (2000-December 2003)
- Taylor Matheny (2001–2003)
- Nick Mondo (1999-2003) (Returned for a match in 2017)
- Christopher Nowinski (2001-June 24, 2003)
- Ahmed Johnson (1989-November 2003)

== Deaths ==
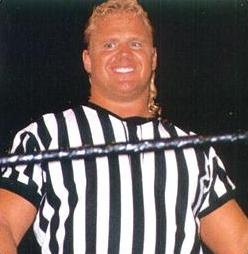
Curt Hennig

- January 18 - The Original Sheik, 76
- February 3 - Shadito Cruz, 88
- February 10 – Curt Hennig, 44
- March 19 – Hiromichi Fuyuki, 42
- March 20 - Sailor Art Thomas, 79
- April 16 - Ray Mendoza, 73
- May 1 – Miss Elizabeth, 42
- June 2 – Freddie Blassie, 85
- July 20 - Bullwhip Johnson, 49
- August 8 - Giant Ochiai, 30
- August 24 - Kent Walton, 86
- September 7 - Great Antonio, 75
- September 25 – Anthony Durante, 36
- October 16 – Stu Hart, 88
- October 19 – Road Warrior Hawk, 46
- October 26 - Floyd Creatchman, 46
- November 6 - Crash Holly, 32
- November 24 - Dick Hutton, 80
- November 29 – Moondog Spot, 51
- December 6 – Jerry Tuite, 36
- December 19 - Mike Lozansky, 35
- December 26 – Danny Fargo, 44

== See also ==
- List of WWA pay-per-view events
- List of WWE pay-per-view events
