= ROH One Year Anniversary Show =

Professional wrestling event

One Year Anniversary Show
- Promotion: Ring of Honor
- Date: February 8, 2003
- City: Queens, New York
- Venue: Elks Lodge
- Attendance: 700

ROH Anniversary Show chronology
← Previous; First	Next → 2nd Anniversary

Event chronology
← Previous; Revenge On The Prophecy	Next → Expect The Unexpected

ROH One Year Anniversary Show was the first ROH Anniversary Show professional wrestling event produced by Ring of Honor (ROH). It took place on February 8, 2003 at the Elks Lodge in Queens, New York.

== Production ==
=== Storylines ===
ROH One Year Anniversary Show featured nine different professional wrestling matches that involved different wrestlers from pre-existing scripted feuds and storylines. Wrestlers were portrayed as either villains or heroes in the scripted events that built tension and culminated in a wrestling match involving.

The shows is Da Hit Squad (Mafia and Monsta Mack), Divine Storm (Chris Divine and Quiet Storm), The S.A.T. (Jose and Joel Maximo) (with Trinity) and Mikey Whipwreck vs. Special K (Angel Dust, Brian XL, Deranged, Dixie, Izzy, Jody Fleisch, and Slim J) (with Hydro, Slugger and Yeyo) in a Handicap Tag team match.

=== Background ===
It is also the first ever ROH Anniversary event in Ring of Honor history.

== Event ==
=== Preliminary matches ===
The first match was a Four Corner Survival match between E. Z. Money, Chad Collyer, Colt Cabana and Michael Shane. Collyer had applied a Texas Cloverleaf to Shane but Shane made it to the ropes and Money entered the ring and delivered a Cha-Ching to Collyer for the win.

Next, Texas Wrestling Academy students Don Juan, Fast Eddie and Hotstuff Hernandez took on The Carnage Crew members DeVito, H. C. Loc and Masada. Fast Eddie attempted to hit a springboard moonsault to H. C. Loc but Loc hit him with a hubcap in the mid-air, resulting in Carnage Crew getting disqualified. They continued to attack their opponents after the match until Christopher Street Connection made the save.

Next, Jay Briscoe took on Mark Briscoe. Jay delivered three consecutive Jay-Drillers to Mark for the win.

Next, Homicide took on Steve Corino, who brought out Simply Luscious, Samoa Joe, C. W. Anderson and Michael Shane as members of his Group. Homicide attacked Corino with the microphone to start the match. Near the end of the match, Corino delivered an Old School Expulsion to gain a near-fall and then applied a cobra clutch on Homicide but he made it to the ropes so Corino dragged him in the middle of the ring to apply the cobra clutch and win by submission. After the match, Corino continued to choke Homicide, leading to the crowd jumping the rail to brawl in the ring.

Later, a match was about to begin between The Ring Crew Express (Kevin Dunn and Kirby Marcos) and The Outcast Killaz but Gary Michael Cappetta interrupted them before the match even began and brought out C. W. Anderson, who attacked both teams and issued an open challenge for a match which was answered by CM Punk. Anderson was about to hit an Anderson Spinebuster but Punk rolled through with a sunset flip and pinned Anderson for the win.

Next, Bryan Danielson took on Samoa Joe. Joe apparently knocked out Danielson with knee strikes in the head and nailed a powerbomb but as he went to pick up him, Danielson pinned him with a small package for the win.

The following match was a three-way between A.J. Styles, Low Ki and Paul London for a future ROH Championship opportunity. Ki nailed a Ki Krusher to Styles from the top rope, which put both men down on the mat, so London hit a shooting star press on Styles for the win. ROH Champion Xavier challenged London immediately after the match. London nailed a shooting star press on Xavier and covered him for the pinfall but Allison Danger pulled Xavier out of the ring right before the three count. Danger entered the ring but Alexis Laree speared her. The match continued between Xavier and London as Xavier ended up pinning London with a roll-up to retain the title.

=== Main event match ===
The team of Da Hit Squad (Mafia and Monsta Mack), Divine Storm (Chris Divine and Quiet Storm), The S.A.T. (Jose and Joel Maximo) and Mikey Whipwreck competed against Special K (Angel Dust, Brian XL, Deranged, Dixie, Hydro, Izzy, Jody Fleisch, Slim J, Slugger and Yeyo) in a Handicap Scramble match. Whipwreck turned on his team mid-way into the match by hitting Whippersnappers on his teammates and joined Special K. Trinity confronted Whipwreck on it and Slugger hit her with a bodybag and then Whipwreck and Slugger took her to the backstage. The action continued between the two teams. Mafia delivered a Burning Hammer to Deranged from the top rope for the win.

== Reception ==
J.D. Dunn of 411Mania rated the event a score of 7 out of 10, writing "This is another one of those cases of too much of a good thing. At nearly 4 hours, it could use a good trimming. The riot took up nearly half an hour with all the replays. But, otherwise, it was four hours of solid wrestling and angle development."

Derek Burgan of Pro Wrestling Torch wrote "ROH's First Year Anniversary Show is definitely going down in the top 10 ROH shows of All Time. The fan riot was quite the spectacle and both matches with Paul London were incredible."

== Results ==
No.	Results	Stipulations	Times
1	E. Z. Money defeated Chad Collyer, Colt Cabana and Michael Shane	Four Corner Survival match	15:18
2	Team Texas Wrestling Academy (Don Juan, Fast Eddie and Hotstuff Hernandez) (with Rudy Boy Gonzalez) defeated The Carnage Crew (DeVito, H. C. Loc and Masada) by disqualification	Six-man tag team match	5:42
3	Jay Briscoe defeated Mark Briscoe	Singles match	16:40
4	Steve Corino (with Simply Luscious and Samoa Joe) defeated Homicide	Singles match	12:17
5	CM Punk defeated C. W. Anderson	Singles match	9:42
6	Bryan Danielson defeated Samoa Joe	Singles match	15:21
7	Paul London defeated A.J. Styles and Low Ki	Three-way match to determine the #1 contender for the ROH Championship	18:50
8	Xavier (c) (with Allison Danger) defeated Paul London	Singles match for the ROH Championship	19:33
9	Da Hit Squad (Mafia and Monsta Mack), Divine Storm (Chris Divine and Quiet Storm), The S.A.T. (Jose and Joel Maximo) (with Trinity) and Mikey Whipwreck defeated Special K (Angel Dust, Brian XL, Deranged, Dixie, Izzy, Jody Fleisch, and Slim J) (w/ Hydro, Slugger and Yeyo)	Handicap Scramble match	33:37
(c) / – the champion(s) heading into the match

== See also ==
- 2003 in professional wrestling
- List of Ring of Honor pay-per-view events
