= Benevolent and Protective Order of Elks, Lodge Number 878 =

Clubhouse in Queens, New York

- U.S. National Register of Historic Places
- New York City Landmark
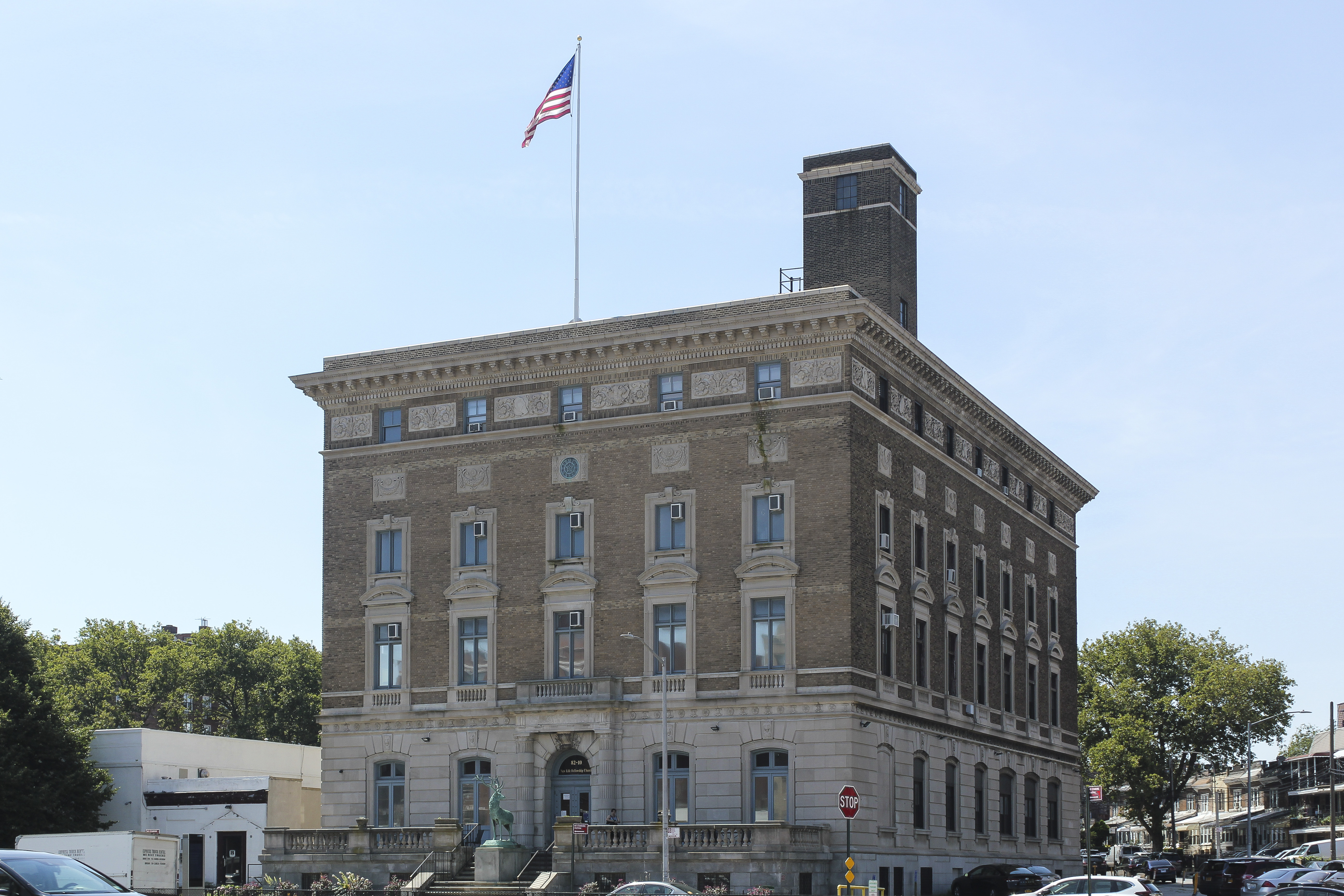
- Seen in July 2020
- Location: 82-10, 82-20 Queens Blvd., Elmhurst, New York
- Coordinates: 40.7371°N 73.8811°W
- Built: 1923–1924, 1930
- Built by: McIntee Construction Co.
- Architect: The Ballinger Company; Sidney L. Strauss
- Architectural style: Italian Renaissance
- NRHP reference No.: 14000938
- NYCL No.: 2086

Significant dates
- Added to NRHP: November 19, 2014
- Designated NYCL: August 14, 2001

Benevolent and Protective Order of Elks, Lodge Number 878 (also known as the Queensboro Elks Lodge or Elks Lodge 878) is a historic Elks lodge on Queens Boulevard in the Elmhurst neighborhood of Queens in New York City. The 3 1/2-story Italian Renaissance-style main building and two-story annex were both built in 1923–1924 and designed by the Ballinger Company. A three-story rear addition was added in 1930.

The building is made of granite, limestone, and brick. It features a granite-block terrace with granite balustrade, limestone arched entrance, and an elaborate cornice made of architectural terracotta. Lodge 878 was once was the largest such lodge in the Eastern United States, with 28 inn rooms, bowling alleys, game rooms, ladies' and gentlemen's lounges, and a 60-foot (18 m) bar. A statue of an elk is outside the Queens Boulevard entrance.

From its completion in 1924 until the late 20th century, Lodge 878 was extremely influential in Queens politics, with up to 6,600 members in the 1960s. The members were mostly white and male. In the late 20th century, Lodge 878 saw declining membership amid Queens' changing demographics, and the building was rented out for other events. The Elks sold its main building to New Life Fellowship Church in 2001, but it continues to meet in the annex as the Brooklyn Queensborough Elks Lodge. The building is a New York City Designated Landmark and is listed on the National Register of Historic Places.

== Description ==
The Benevolent and Protective Order of Elks' Lodge 878 building was designed by the Ballinger Company in the Italian Renaissance Revival style. It is composed of the 3 1/2-story main building at 82-10 Queens Boulevard; a two-story annex to the east at 82-20 Queens Boulevard; and a three-story rear addition to the south of the main building. Elks Lodge 878 occupies a land lot on the south side of Queens Boulevard, between Simonson and Goldsmith Streets. The main building is on the western side of the block, nearer Simonson Street. The lodge's annex is on the east side of the block toward Goldsmith Street, while the rear addition faces south in the direction of Grand Avenue. The lodge and annex each occupy one land lot, but they only take up half of their respective lots, with the remainder being used as parking areas. An electronic sign is at the western end of the block, at the corner of Queens Boulevard and Simonson Street.

At the time of Lodge 878's construction, the architecture of fraternal organizations' buildings varied drastically. Many lodges built at the time were designed as freestanding structures that acted as monuments, and Elks Lodge 878 was one such example, being highly visible from Queens Boulevard. The main building's facade contained many Italian Renaissance details, including a rusticated limestone facade on its first floor; balustrades; entablatures; and decorative elements such as cornices. Lodge 878 had amenities such as a swimming pool, banquet hall, gym, bowling alley, lodge room, and residential suites for members; it once had a barber shop and restaurant as well. Decorations related to the Elks are prevalent inside, including elk reliefs on the building's doorknobs.

=== Main building ===
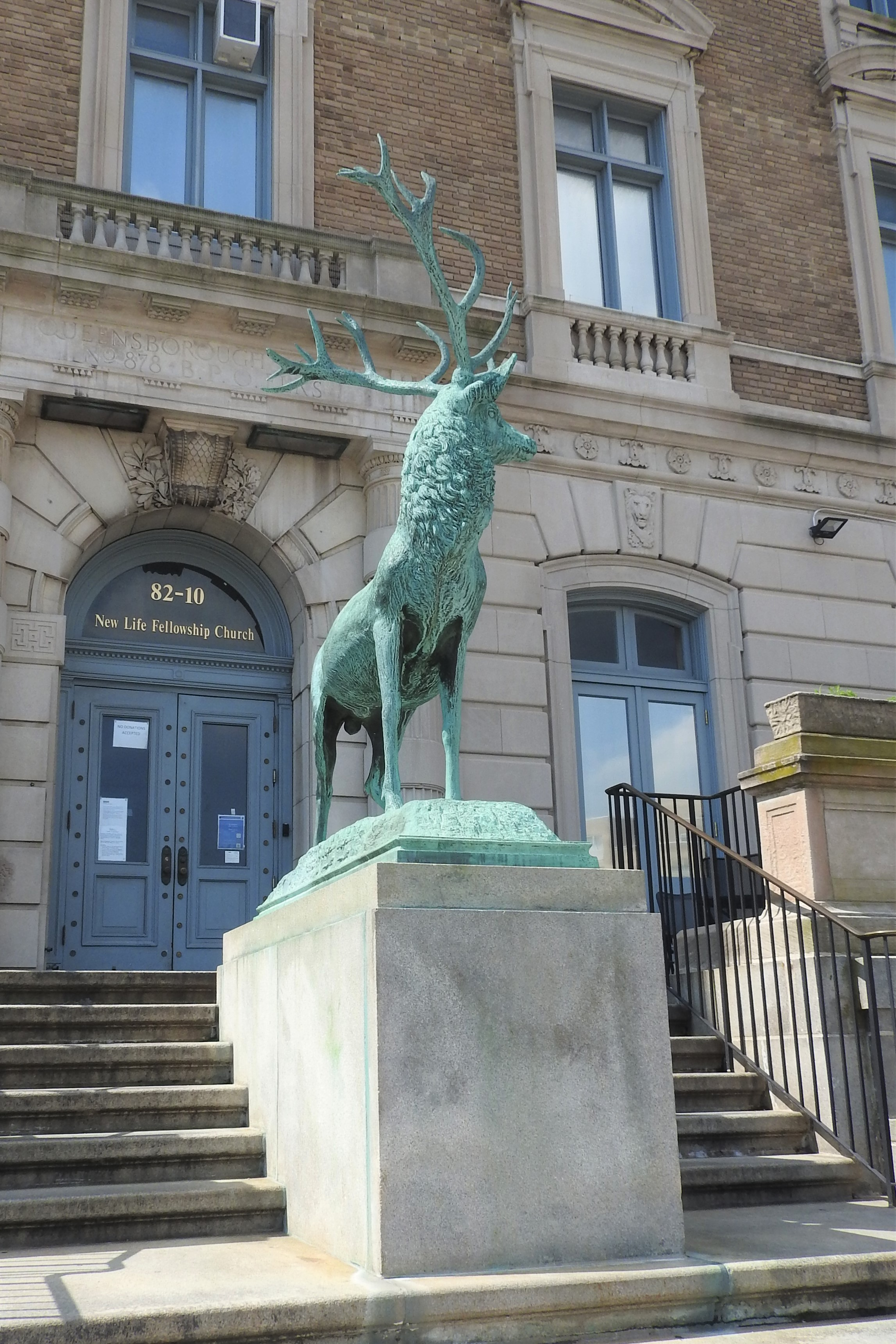
Elk statue outside the main building

The main building is three and a half stories, with a raised basement. It has a U-shaped floor plan. The structure measures 75 by 116 feet (23 by 35 m), with the longer side facing Simonson Street.

==== Facade ====
The facade consists of granite at its base, rusticated limestone on the first floor, and brick with limestone ornament on the upper floors. The main elevation on Queens Boulevard, facing north, consists of five bays, while the elevations to the west and east contain seven bays. Outside the main building's northern elevation is a set of stairs leading to broad terrace with a balustrade. A bronze elk statue is on a pedestal in the middle of the staircase. According to one legend about the building, Elks Lodge 878 members would squeeze the elk's testicles for good luck before they entered.

On the first story, in the center bay of the northern elevation, is the main entrance arch, which contains a double door and a semicircular window, and is topped by an elaborate keystone. The arch is flanked by a pair of Doric-style engaged columns, which support a frieze with the text queensborough lodge, no. 878 b.p.o.elks. The northern elevation's first floor also contains four segmental-arched openings, two on each side of the main entrance arch, each of which contains a double door and a keystone depicting a lion's head. The side elevations, including the four-bay-wide rear addition, contain casement windows with lion's-head keystones. An entablature and small cornice runs above the first story.

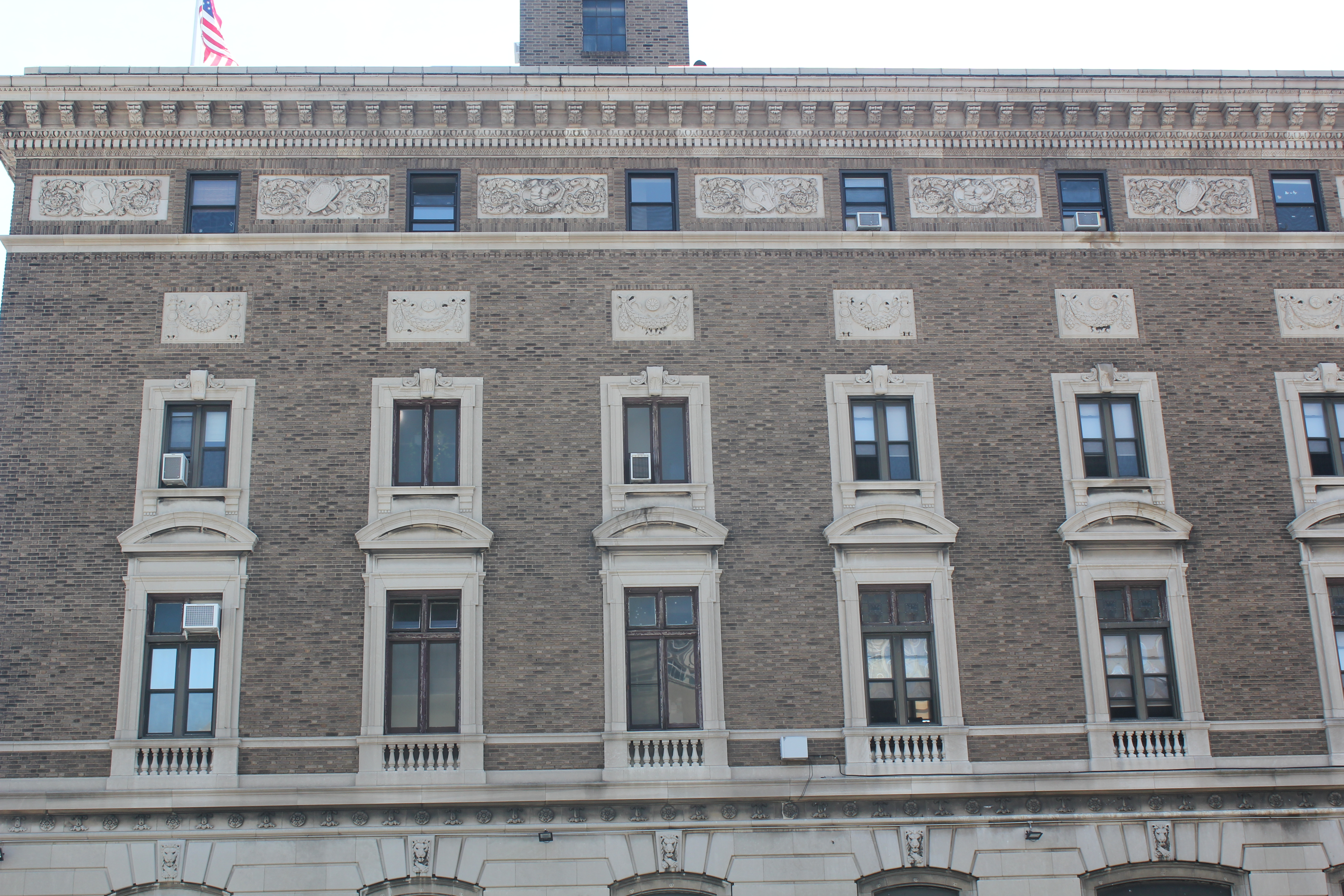
Second and third floor facade detail

The second and third stories and the attic are clad with buff brick and contain casement windows. On the original building, but not its rear addition, the second-floor windows are set beneath curved architraves, with balustrades at the bottom of each opening. Similarly, the original building's third-floor window openings are topped by scrolled keystones and set beneath carved limestone panels. The rear addition contains a simple brick facade on the upper stories with rectangular windows. A small cornice separates the third floor from the attic, which contains wide carved limestone panels flanking each of the narrow windows. A larger, more extensively decorated terracotta cornice runs above the attic. The eastern elevation has a fire escape.

The rear addition's southern elevation is an undecorated brick facade with segmental-arched first floor window and rectangular second- and third-floor windows, as well as a handicap-accessible entrance. The main building's southern elevation is mostly blocked by the rear addition, but the upper stories of the southern elevation are similar to those on the other three elevations. A flagpole and brick elevator room are atop the roof, while a brick chimney stack is at the southeast corner of the rear addition.

==== Features ====
The basement had a grill room with a 60-foot-long (18 m) bar and a six-lane bowling alley. Also in the basement were lockers, restrooms, and a barber shop. The bowling alley was subsequently converted to a multipurpose room, while the rest of the basement was reconfigured with classrooms. It has a terrazzo floor, wooden wainscoting, wooden ceiling beams, and wood-sash casement windows with red stained glass. The basement is accessed by a stair from the first floor with wooden wainscoted walls and brass railings.

The first floor has a vestibule inside the main entrance, which contains limestone walls with wood trim. The vestibule leads to a first-floor lobby measuring 22 by 47 feet (6.7 by 14.3 m). It has plaster ceilings, wood-trimmed limestone walls, and terrazzo floors. There are two rooms, one to each side, which served as the men's and women's lounges; they have bronze chandeliers, parquet wooden floors, and decorative fireplace mantels. Other rooms extend from the lobby; on the east, there are stairs leading up and down, as well as an elevator bank. In the back (south) was a dining room measuring 24 by 72 feet (7.3 by 21.9 m), a ticket office, a coat room, restrooms, and a kitchen. The dining room still exists and has checkerboard terrazzo floors, square piers, and bas reliefs. The interior of the rear addition has a health center. The first floor was available for non-members to use as well.

The second and third floors contained offices and game rooms. The common area of the second floor has wood-trimmed plaster walls, parquet wooden floors, and wooden ceiling beams. The southern section has the former lodge room (doubling as an auditorium and used as a church room), while the northern section has offices. The lodge room has capacity for up to 700 people. It is themed to Mayan or Aztec culture, with stained glass panels symbolizing charity, justice, brotherly love, and fidelity, the cardinal virtues of the Elks. Inside the lodge room is a 3-rank, 9-manual Wurlitzer organ manufactured in 1924. The third floor is furnished similarly to the second floor, and has balconies overlooking the lodge room, with stationary wooden seats. In the rear addition, there are classrooms and offices.

The attic contained 28 suites for members to rent. These were arranged as six double-bedroom suites and 22 single-bedroom suites, with connecting bathrooms between pairs of suites. The suites were available to members for a monthly fee; The New York Times reported in 1995 that this fee was $220. The suites were on the east and west sides of the main building, and lined a T-shaped corridor.

=== Annex ===
The annex is clad with stucco and contains recessed arches with small rectangular windows inside each arch. The main entrance is on Goldsmith Street along the eastern elevation and contains three pairs of doors. A one-story western extension contains a side entrance to Queens Boulevard. A modillioned metal cornice runs atop the annex.

The annex originally contained the swimming pool on the first floor and a gym in the mezzanine, though the pool is no longer extant. The first floor was converted into a multipurpose room that could be used as a bar, dining room, or handball court. The mezzanine floor is smaller than the first floor and has a conference room and an office. The interior has wooden floors and sheet-rock partitions.

== History ==
=== Planning and construction ===
During the late 1890s, the former town of Newtown was renamed Elmhurst and became part of the City of Greater New York. Elmhurst subsequently became developed as a commercial and residential neighborhood, with the arrival of the New York City Subway and Long Island Rail Road, as well as the construction of Queens Boulevard in the early 20th century, connecting Elmhurst to the Queensboro Bridge to Manhattan. Prior to development, the plot that would later become Lodge 878 was undeveloped, and a stream called Horse Brook ran through the southern side of the lot, though this stream had ceased to run above ground by 1902. To accommodate the 200-foot (61 m) width of Queens Boulevard, buildings along the route were demolished, and the future Lodge 878 lot was decreased in size in 1910.

The Elks, meanwhile, had been founded in 1868 as an all-white, all-male fraternal organization, growing rapidly in subsequent years. Lodge 878 was founded in 1903, and for its first 21 years, met at the Lodge 828 building at 21-42 44th Drive in Long Island City. A 1906 Elks bylaw subsequently limited the number of Elks chapters to one in each municipality, making Lodge 878 the only Elks chapter in Queens. (Note: Existing lodges were grandfathered into the bylaw. In 1928, there was one Elks Lodge each in Manhattan, Brooklyn, and Queens; Lodge 878 was the only lodge in Queens.) Lodge 878 bought the plot at the southeast corner of Queens Boulevard and Simonson Street in 1921. The Elmhurst location was chosen after extensive discussion. Elks from Jamaica, Richmond Hill, and Woodhaven favored a location in Forest Hills, while Elks from Long Island City and Long Island's North Shore advocated for the Elmhurst location.

The cornerstone of the Lodge 878 building was laid on October 6, 1923. To celebrate the groundbreaking and Lodge 878's twentieth anniversary, a parade of almost 300 automobiles carrying 1,500 people drove down Queens Boulevard from Long Island City to the Lodge 878 site. The Ballinger Company had designed plans for the main building and annex's construction, while the McIntee Construction Company was contracted to erect the building. The Elks held a fundraiser for the building's furnishings in late 1924. The lodge was opened on October 26, 1924, and the Elks' grand exalted ruler John G. Price traveled to Queens in December 1924 to dedicate the new building. It had ultimately cost $750,000 (equivalent to $11 million in 2024). Upon completion, it ranked as the Eastern United States' largest Elks Lodge.

=== Elks use ===
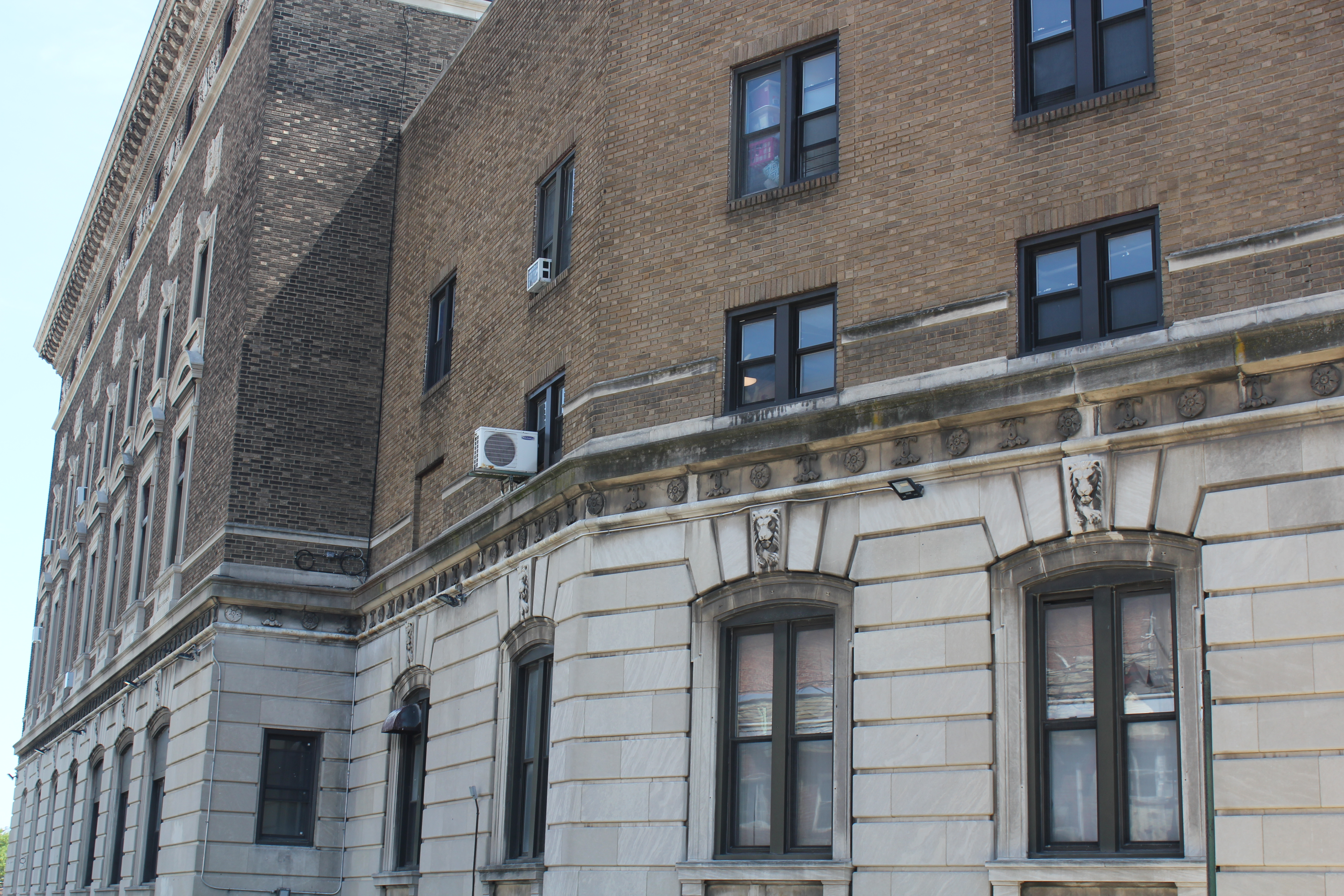
Rear addition, built 1930

Lodge 878 originally had a kitchen behind the main building, measuring 21.67 by 60 feet (7 by 18 m). The Elks planned to eventually add a four-story structure behind the main building, with a connecting passageway, but this was not built. Sidney L. Strauss, a lodge member, was instead hired to design the three-story rear addition, replacing the single-story kitchen. Babor-Comeau and Company constructed the addition, which was finished in 1930.

During the mid-20th century, Lodge 878 was influential in Queens politics, with members of Lodge 878 representing both the Democratic and Republican parties. The New York Times said that "If you wanted a job in 1960's Queens, you came to the Elks." By the 1960s, Lodge 878 had 6,600 members and 26 staff, with between 300 and 400 members attending the weekly meetings. Lodge 878 members were highly involved in charity; every year, Lodge 878 held a six-day Elks Bazaar in which it gave away up to 24 new cars. In addition, it was involved in arranging the funerals of its members.

Lodge 878 was reported in 1970 to have a membership of 4,093, making it New York state's largest Elks Lodge. A Times reporter, visiting two years later, said that the lodge was among the largest in the United States, with 3,500 members according to the lodge's executive secretary. However, Lodge 878 and the Elks as a whole suffered a major decline in membership in the late 20th century. Lodge 878 lost about 90% of its members between 1975 and 2001. This was despite the fact that people of other races were allowed to join the Elks in 1973, and women were able to gain membership in 1995.

=== Decline and sale ===
After the annual property taxes on the building increased from $35,000 in 1990 to $86,000 in 1995, the Elks placed the Lodge 878 building for sale. Its membership had declined to about 900; the weekly meetings had been cut back to biweekly meetings, and attendance had declined to 50. The annual car raffle had been canceled in 1985 after only a single car was offered at the raffle. Elmhurst's population had changed dramatically from 1980 to 1990; during that time, the white population had declined by 40%, while the Asian population had doubled and overtaken the white population in Elmhurst. Lodge 878's membership was still mostly white and male in 1995; the lodge's treasurer stated that the neighborhood's more recent residents, who were predominantly immigrants, had not shown interest in the Elks. The New York Times described the lodge later that year as "an anachronism with an all-white membership that has failed to attract minorities". One of the Elks' problems was that, even though one prerequisite for membership was U.S. citizenship, an increasing number of Queens residents were not U.S. citizens.

The lodge started to rent out its facilities for celebrations such as Chinese weddings and Latin American quinceañeras. The New Life Fellowship Church, a Korean Pentecostal church, started renting space in the mezzanine in 1995. Wrestling groups started running shows at Lodge 878, including Extreme Championship Wrestling, which rented out the lodge room for several decades. Among the wrestling events at the lodge was the It Ain't Seinfeld supercard event in 1998 and the ROH One Year Anniversary Show in 2003. The building was also rented for film and TV shows. Despite the revenue from renting out the building, Lodge 878 was barely able to make a profit.

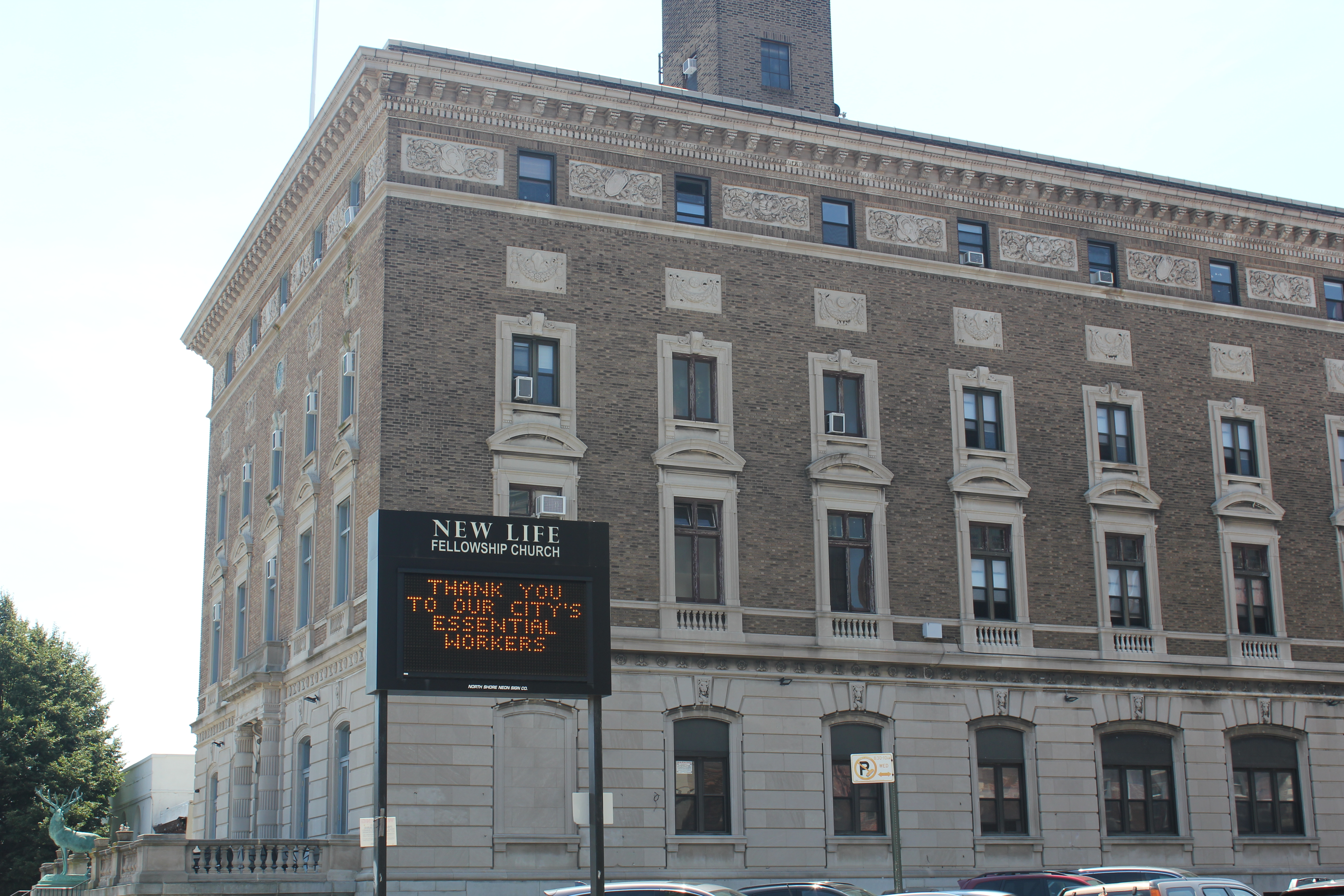
Electronic sign outside the Elks Lodge 878 building, installed by the New Life Fellowship Church

In 2000, the Elks began negotiating with the New Life Fellowship Church to sell the main building because the Elks were unable to pay a $60,000 tax bill for the building. During the sale negotiations, the Elks stipulated that they wished to keep occupying the building's first floor for 99 years without paying rent. After a year of negotiations, the Elks sold the main building to the church in 2001. The Elks continued to own the annex, but closed the annex's pool and added partitions. By then, Lodge 878 only had 550 members. Because of the split ownership of the main building and its annex, these were divided into two separate lots for tax purposes. The New Life Fellowship Church turned the main building's rear addition into a health center in 2009, as well as made various improvements for handicap accessibility in the 2010s.

== Critical reception and landmark designations ==
Upon its completion, the Lodge 878 building received critical acclaim. The new building won the Queens Chamber of Commerce's Annual Building Award for 1925. In the September 1926 edition of Architectural Forum, which had a series of three article on the buildings of fraternal organizations, the building's elk statue was depicted on the first page of the three-article series. The series' last article praised the Ballinger Company as having "carried out, brilliantly and effectively, an adaptation of the highly decorative style of the ancient Maya builders of Central America."

The New York City Landmarks Preservation Commission designated the main building as a landmark on August 4, 2001, acknowledging its importance to Queens politics and making it the first Elks Lodge in the city to be an official city landmark. Neither the annex nor the rear addition were designated as city landmarks. The lodge, annex, and addition were added to the National Register of Historic Places on November 19, 2014.

== See also ==
- List of New York City Designated Landmarks in Queens
- National Register of Historic Places listings in Queens County, New York
