= Los Guerreros =

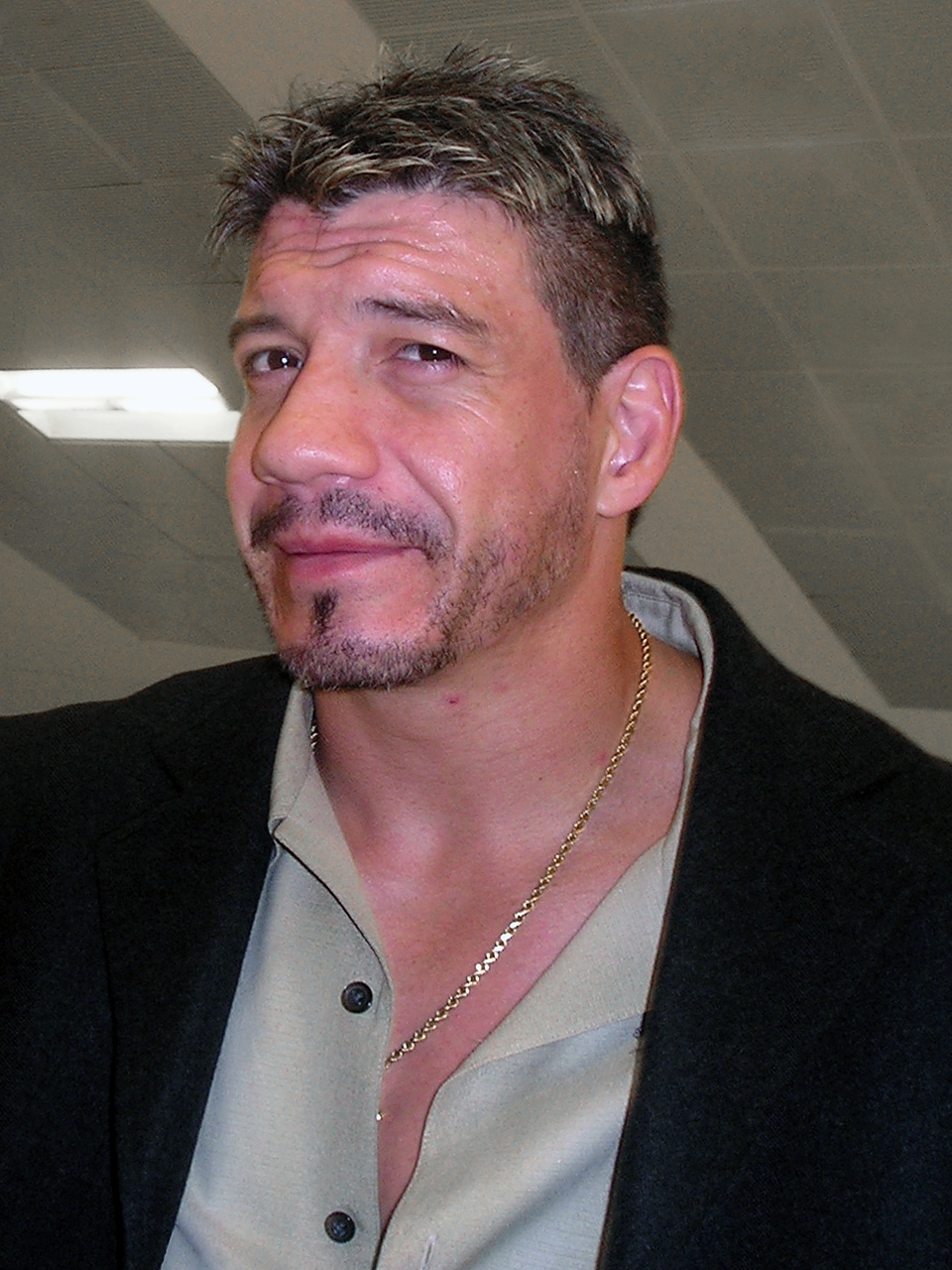
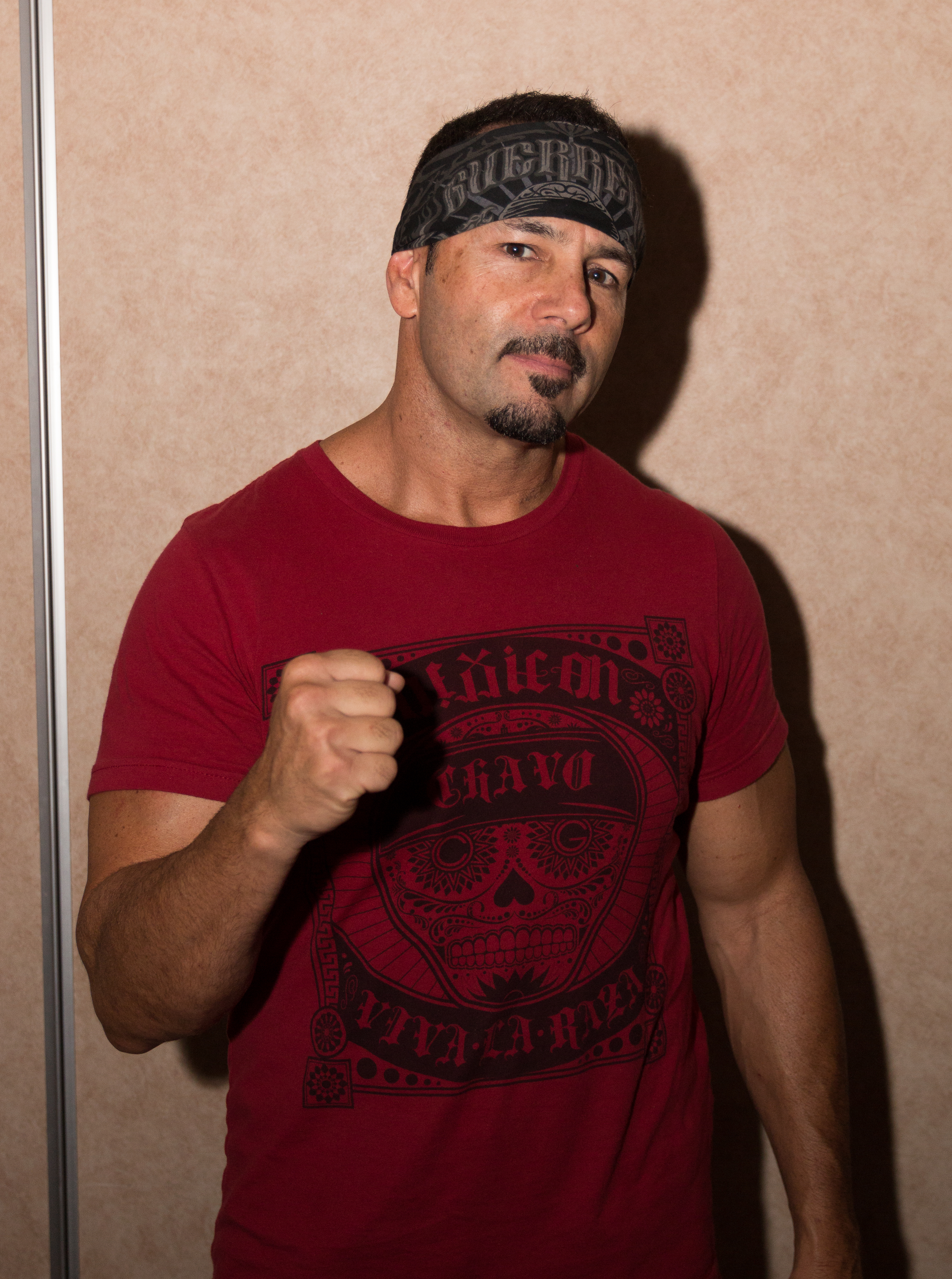
- Eddie (left) and Chavo (right)

Tag team
- Members: Eddie Guerrero; Chavo Guerrero
- Name(s): Los Guerreros; Eddie & Chavo; Eddie & Chavo Guerrero
- Billed heights: Eddie: 5 ft 10 in (1.78 m); Chavo Jr.: 5 ft 9 in (1.75 m)
- Combined billed weight: 428 lb (194 kg; 30.6 st)
- Billed from: El Paso, Texas
- Debut: 1998
- Disbanded: June 16, 2005
- Years active: 1998; 2002–2004; 2005

Los Guerreros (Spanish for “the warriors”) was an American professional wrestling tag team, which consisted of Eddie Guerrero and his nephew Chavo Guerrero Jr. Both wrestlers were members of the Guerrero family. They wrestled as a team in World Championship Wrestling (WCW) and most notably World Wrestling Entertainment (WWE) on the SmackDown! brand, where they became two-time Tag Team Champions.

== History ==
=== World Championship Wrestling (1998) ===
In World Championship Wrestling (WCW), Chavo and Eddie were not really a tag team as they were later on in WWE. Chavo had only a year of experience in contrast to Eddie's eight or nine years. As part of their angle, Eddie would continually try to make Chavo adopt Eddie's cheating tactics, but Chavo often refused to do so.

On the March 9, 1998 episode of Nitro, Chavo lost to Booker T in a wrestling match. After the match, Eddie suplexed Chavo to teach him a lesson. On the March 12 episode of WCW Thunder, he defeated his nephew Chavo in a match and forced him to become his "slave". At Uncensored, Chavo was forced to support Eddie when he faced Booker T for Booker's World Television Championship. Eddie lost the match after receiving a missile dropkick. Eddie and Chavo then feuded with Último Dragón. Chavo lost to Dragón at Spring Stampede. At Slamboree, Eddie defeated Dragón despite interference from Chavo. After the match, Chavo kissed Eddie and began to display insane behavior. Eddie would leave Chavo during a match, and that would lead them to feud with each other. At The Great American Bash, Chavo got an upset victory over Eddie. They faced each other in a Hair vs. Hair match at Bash at the Beach which Eddie won. Continuing to show his crazy behavior Chavo would shave his own head while Eddie looked on in disbelief. Eddie saved Chavo from beatings by Stevie Ray, seeming that he would align with Chavo but he wanted his release. Chavo's treatment at the hands of Eddie drove him "crazy" and he adopted the gimmick of a psycho fixated with a hobby horse he dubbed "Pepé." This led to a feud with Norman Smiley in which Pepé was thrown into a woodchipper by Smiley. Another result of his insanity, was his inability to join Eddie's Latino World Order stable, which was a take-off of the nWo. The stable included nearly every Latino wrestler in WCW except Chavo.

=== World Wrestling Entertainment (2002-2004, 2005) ===
==== WWE Tag Team Champions (2002–2003) ====
Eddie Guerrero reunited with Chavo Guerrero in World Wrestling Entertainment (WWE) in 2002. Chavo joined the SmackDown! brand shortly after the 2002 draft lottery while Eddie was working on the Raw brand as Chris Benoit's tag team partner. Eddie and Benoit jumped to the SmackDown! brand in July and Benoit moved onto a feud with Kurt Angle while Eddie formed a villainous tag team with Chavo. They teamed up for the first time on the August 15 episode of SmackDown!, where they lost to Edge and Rey Mysterio by disqualification. Shortly after, they adopted the name "Los Guerreros" when the two were entered into a tournament to crown the first-ever WWE Tag Team Champions for SmackDown!. Los Guerreros defeated Mark Henry and Rikishi to make it to the semi-finals where they lost to the eventual winners Kurt Angle and Chris Benoit. Los Guerreros unsuccessfully challenged Angle and Benoit for the titles at Rebellion.

Edge and Rey Mysterio won the titles afterwards. At Survivor Series, Los Guerreros defeated Benoit and Angle and Edge and Mysterio in a triple threat elimination match to win their first WWE Tag Team Championship. After facing makeshift teams consisting of Edge, Mysterio, and Benoit for a few months, they turned babyfaces to feud with John Cena and B-2, whom they defeated to retain the tag team titles on the January 16, 2003 episode of SmackDown!. Los Guerreros dropped the titles to Team Angle (Shelton Benjamin and Charlie Haas) on the February 6 episode of SmackDown!, leading to a lengthy feud between the two teams. Los Guerreros continued their feud with Team Angle as they failed to win the titles from Team Angle in a triple threat match at WrestleMania XIX, also involving Chris Benoit and Rhyno. Los Guerreros received another title shot against Team Angle at Backlash but lost again. Los Guerreros were set to get a rematch against Team Angle for the WWE Tag Team Championship in a ladder match at Judgment Day but Chavo suffered an injury and was replaced by Tajiri as Eddie's partner. The duo went on to win the titles. They lost the titles back to Team Angle, by then known as The World's Greatest Tag Team in July. Eddie then turned on Tajiri and turned into a villain.

He went on to win a tournament to win the reinstated United States Championship. However, Eddie turned into a fan favorite by beginning a feud with John Cena on the August 28 episode of SmackDown!. Los Guerreros reunited on the September 11 episode of SmackDown! when Chavo returned to WWE and helped Eddie in defeating Cena in a Parking Lot Brawl. The following week, on SmackDown!, Los Guerreros defeated World's Greatest Tag Team for their second WWE Tag Team Championship, thus making Eddie, a double champion. They soon entered a feud with Big Show, which resulted in Eddie losing the United States Championship to Big Show at No Mercy. Los Guerreros would lose the WWE Tag Team Championship to the Basham Brothers on the October 23 episode of SmackDown!.

==== Split and feud (2003–2004) ====
The loss of the tag team titles resulted in bickering between Eddie Guerrero and Chavo Guerrero on the October 30 episode of SmackDown!, where Chavo blamed Eddie for the loss of the tag team titles and Eddie would apologize to Chavo only to get attacked by Basham Brothers. On the November 6 episode of SmackDown!, Eddie defeated the Basham Brothers in a handicap match to earn a rematch for the WWE Tag Team Championship for the following week's SmackDown!, where the Basham Brothers tricked Eddie into leaving by telling him the news that his wife's sister had a car accident and Chavo was forced to face them in a handicap match, which Chavo lost. The title match was postponed to Survivor Series, where Los Guerreros failed to win the titles.

On the November 20 episode of SmackDown!, Los Guerreros defeated the World's Greatest Tag Team but were attacked by the latter team after the match and Chavo's leg was injured in the attack, which led to him blaming Eddie for the assault. The following week, on SmackDown!, Chavo was attacked by the World's Greatest Tag Team after Eddie defeated Charlie Haas. Eddie then helped Chavo in beating Shelton Benjamin in a match but Chavo accused him of stealing the spotlight. Eddie and Chavo finally began having problems with each other after losing a match to World's Greatest Tag Team on the January 1, 2004 episode of SmackDown!. Kurt Angle tried to reunite them and got them a WWE Tag Team Championship match against Basham Brothers on the January 8 episode of SmackDown!, which they failed to win and Chavo turned on Eddie by attacking him after the match, thus disbanding Los Guerreros. Eddie and Chavo began feuding with each other on the January 15 episode of SmackDown!, when Chavo's father Chavo Guerrero, Sr. apologized to Eddie for Chavo's actions but it turned out to be a ruse as he set up Eddie for an attack by Chavo Jr. The feud culminated in a match between Eddie and Chavo Jr. at the Royal Rumble, which Eddie won.

Eddie would then rise to the main event status by earning himself a WWE Championship title shot against Brock Lesnar at No Way Out, which Eddie won, thus winning his first world championship. Chavo would also win the Cruiserweight Championship at the same event by defeating Rey Mysterio. On the February 19 episode of SmackDown!, Chavo challenged Eddie to a match for the WWE Championship, which featured Kurt Angle as the special guest referee. The match ended in a no contest after Angle turned on Eddie and attacked him. This ended the feud between Eddie and Chavo.

==== Brief reunion (2005) ====
In March 2005, Chavo began turning Eddie Guerrero and Rey Mysterio, the reigning WWE Tag Team Champions at the time against one another, which would lead to a match between Eddie and Mysterio at WrestleMania 21. Eddie lost the match and began having problems with Mysterio, which led to Eddie ultimately turning on Mysterio after losing the titles to MNM. This led to a feud between Eddie and Mysterio. Eddie and Chavo were last seen at together at Judgment Day when Chavo tried to interfere in the match between Mysterio and Eddie. Eddie and Chavo reunited as a tag team at a live event on June 16 against their respective rivals Paul London and Rey Mysterio in a losing effort, thus marking the final time that Eddie and Chavo teamed with each other before Eddie's death on November 13 later that year.

== Championships and accomplishments ==
- Cauliflower Alley Club
  - Men’s Wrestling Award (2008)
- Pro Wrestling Illustrated
  - Ranked Eddie Guerrero No. 81 of the top 500 wrestlers of the "PWI Years" in 2003
- World Wrestling Entertainment
  - WWE Tag Team Championship (2 times)
  - WWE United States Championship (1 time) – Eddie
- Wrestling Observer Newsletter
  - Tag Team of the Year (2002)
