= Verano de Escándalo (2003) =

2003 Lucha Libre AAA World Wide event

Verano de Escándalo 2003 (Spanish for "Summer of Scandal") was a series of major Lucha Libre or professional wrestling shows held by the Mexican wrestling promotion AAA over the summer of 2003. In previous and subsequent years AAA's Verano de Escándalo were a single event, but in 2003 it was a series of three shows held on August 31 (A), September 16 (B) and September 28 (C), 2003. The events featured a number of professional wrestling matches with different wrestlers involved in pre-existing scripted feuds or storylines. Wrestlers portrayed either villains (referred to as Rudos in Mexico) or fan favorites (Técnicos in Mexico) as they competed in wrestling matches with predetermined outcomes.

== Verano de Escándalo 2003-A ==
Verano de Escándalo 2003-A
- Official television logo for the 2003 Verano de Escándalo shows
- Promotion: AAA
- Date: August 31, 2003
- City: Monterrey, Nuevo León, Mexico
- Venue: Arena Solidaridad

Pay-per-view chronology
← Previous; Triplemanía XI	Next → Verano de Escándalo (2003-B)

Verano de Escándalo chronology
← Previous; 2002	Next → 2004

The first 2003 Verano de Escándalo (Spanish for "Summer of Scandal") was the part of the seventh annual Verano de Escándalo professional wrestling show promoted by AAA. The show took place on August 31, 2003 in Monterrey, Nuevo León. The main event of the show was a tag team match with the team of La Parka and Latin Lover facing the team of Cibernético and Héctor Garza. Another featured match was a steel cage match Luchas de Apuestas where the last man in the cage would have his hair shaved off. The participants were El Brazo, Heavy Metal, Oscar Sevilla, Sangre Chicana, El Texano and El Zorro.

=== Production ===
==== Background ====
First held during the summer of 1997 the Mexican professional wrestling, company AAA began holding a major wrestling show during the summer, most often in September, called Verano de Escándalo ("Summer of Scandal"). The Verano de Escándalo show was an annual event from 1997 until 2011, then AAA did not hold a show in 2012 and 2013 before bringing the show back in 2014, but this time in June, putting it at the time AAA previously held their Triplemanía show. In 2012 and 2013 Triplemanía XX and Triplemanía XXI was held in August instead of the early summer. The show often features championship matches or Lucha de Apuestas or bet matches where the competitors risked their wrestling mask or hair on the outcome of the match. In Lucha Libre the Lucha de Apuetas match is considered more prestigious than a championship match and a lot of the major shows feature one or more Apuesta matches. The 2003 Verano de Escándalo show was the seventh show in the series.

==== Storylines ====
The Verano de Escándalo show featured nine professional wrestling matches with different wrestlers involved in pre-existing, scripted feuds, plots, and storylines. Wrestlers were portrayed as either heels (referred to as rudos in Mexico, those that portray the "bad guys") or faces (técnicos in Mexico, the "good guy" characters) as they followed a series of tension-building events, which culminated in a wrestling match or series of matches.

==== Results ====
No.	Results	Stipulations
1	La Chiva, El Chamagol and El Niño de Oro defeated Los Diabolicos (Ángel Mortal, Marabunta and Mr. Cóndor) by disqualification	Six-man Lucha Libre rules tag team match
2	Faby Apache, Lady Apache and Martha Villalobos defeated Tiffany, Poly Star and Princesa Sugey	Six-woman Lucha Libre rules tag team match
3	The Headhunters (I and II) and Los Mini Head Hunters (I and II) defeated El Alebrije, Cuije, Máscara Sagrada and Mascarita Sagrada	Eight-man mixed team match
4	Electroshock, X-Fly, Silver Star and Pimpinela Escarlata defeated "The X-Team" (Charly Manson, Hator, Mr. Águila and Juventud Guerrera)	Eight-person mixed team match
5	Gronda defeated Charly Manson	$30,000 Strength challenge
6	Gronda defeated Chessman	$3,000 Strength challenge
7	Gronda defeated Hator	$3,000 Strength challenge
8	El Brazo lost to Heavy Metal, Oscar Sevilla, Sangre Chicana, El Texano and El Zorro	Steel cage match Lucha de Apuestas
9	La Parka and Latin Lover defeated Cibernético and Héctor Garza	Tag team match

== Verano de Escándalo 2003-B ==
Verano de Escándalo 2003-B
- Official television logo for the 2003 Verano de Escándalo shows
- Promotion: AAA
- Date: September 16, 2003
- City: San Luis Potosí, San Luis Potosí, Mexico
- Venue: Arena Miguel Barragán

Pay-per-view chronology
← Previous; Verano de Escándalo (2003-A)	Next → Verano de Escándalo (2003-C)

Verano de Escándalo chronology
← Previous; 2002	Next → 2004

The second 2003 Verano de Escándalo (Spanish for "Summer of Scandal") was the part of the seventh annual Verano de Escándalo professional wrestling show promoted by AAA. The show took place on September 16, 2003 in San Luis Potosí, San Luis Potosí, Mexico at the Arena Miguel Barragán.

=== Background ===
Verano de Escándalo featured six professional wrestling matches with different wrestlers involved in pre-existing scripted feuds, plots and storylines. Wrestlers portray either heels (referred to as rudos in Mexico, those that portrayed the "bad guys") or faces (técnicos in Mexico, the "good guy" characters) as they followed a series of tension-building events, which culminated in a wrestling match or series of matches. Pirata Morgan was originally announced for the third match, but had to be replaced by Kick Boxer as he did not make it to the arena in time for the show.

=== Results ===
No.	Results	Stipulations
1	La Chiva, El Chamagol and El Niño de Oro defeated Los Diabolicos (Gallego, Mr. Cóndor and Ángel Mortal) by disqualification	Six-man Lucha Libre rules tag team match
2	Octagoncito, Mascarita Sagrada and Rocky Marvin defeated Espectrito Jr., Mini Ozz and Mini Chessman	Six-man Lucha Libre rules tag team match
3	Los Exóticos (Pimpinela Escarlata, Polvo de Estrellas and May Flowers) defeated Kick Boxer and Los Consagrados (El Brazo and El Texano) by disqualification	Lumberjack match
4	Chessman and Tiffany defeated Lady Apache and Electroshock (c)	Intergender tag team match for the AAA World Mixed Tag Team Championship
5	El Zorro and El Oriental defeated Mr. Águila and Psicosis II	Electrified steel cage match
6	La Parka, Latin Lover and Máscara Sagrada defeated Cibernético, Héctor Garza and Juventud Guerrera	Six-man Lucha Libre rules tag team match
(c) / – the champion(s) heading into the match

== Verano de Escándalo 2003-C ==
Verano de Escándalo 2003-C
- Official television logo for the 2003 Verano de Escándalo shows
- Promotion: AAA
- Date: September 28, 2003
- City: Guadalajara, Jalisco, Mexico
- Venue: El Coliseo de Universidad de Guadalajara

Pay-per-view chronology
← Previous; Verano de Escándalo (2003-B)	Next → Guerra de Titanes

Verano de Escándalo chronology
← Previous; 2002	Next → 2004

The third and final 2003 Verano de Escándalo (Spanish for "Summer of Scandal") was the part of the seventh annual Verano de Escándalo professional wrestling show promoted by AAA. The show took place on September 28, 2003 in San Luis Potosí, San Luis Potosí, Mexico at the El Coliseo de Universidad de Guadalajara arena.

=== Background ===
Verano de Escándalo featured six professional wrestling matches with different wrestlers involved in pre-existing scripted feuds, plots and storylines. Wrestlers portray either heels (referred to as rudos in Mexico, those that portrayed the "bad guys") or faces (técnicos in Mexico, the "good guy" characters) as they followed a series of tension-building events, which culminated in a wrestling match or series of matches.

=== Event ===
During the second match of the night referee Piero, who was working a storyline with both teams in the steel cage match ended up in the cage despite not being an announced participants. After both Los Barrio Boys (Alan, Billy and Decnnis) and The Black Family (Cuervo, Ozz and Scoria) left the cage Piero was forced to have his hair shaved off.

=== Results ===
No.	Results	Stipulations
1	Octagoncito and Mascarita Sagrada defeated Los Mini Vipers (Mini Psicosis and Mini Abismo Negro)	Tag team match
2	Piero lost to Los Barrio Boys (Alan, Billy and Decnnis) and The Black Family (Cuervo, Ozz and Scoria)	Six-man steel cage match Lucha de Apuestas
3	Abismo Negro and the X-Team (Charly Manson and Juventud Guerrera) defeated Electroshock, El Alebrije and El Oriental	Six-man Lucha Libre rules tag team match
4	El Zorro (c - Heavy) defeated Mr. Águila (c - UWA Light Heavy)	Singles match for the Mexican National Heavyweight Championship and the UWA World Light Heavyweight Championship
5	Octagón, Latin Lover and Heavy Metal defeated Los Consagrados (Pirata Morgan, Latin Boiler and El Texano)	Six-man Lucha Libre rules tag team match
6	La Parka defeated Cibernético	Street Fight
