= Backlash (2003) =

World Wrestling Entertainment pay-per-view event

- Promotional poster featuring Team Angle (Shelton Benjamin, Kurt Angle, and Charlie Haas)
- Promotion: World Wrestling Entertainment
- Brand(s): Raw; SmackDown!
- Date: April 27, 2003
- City: Worcester, Massachusetts
- Venue: Worcester Centrum
- Attendance: 10,000
- Buy rate: 345,000

Pay-per-view chronology
← Previous; WrestleMania XIX	Next → Judgment Day

Backlash chronology
← Previous; 2002	Next → 2004

The 2003 Backlash was a professional wrestling pay-per-view (PPV) event produced by World Wrestling Entertainment (WWE). It was the fifth annual Backlash and took place on April 27, 2003, at the Worcester Centrum in Worcester, Massachusetts, held for wrestlers from the promotion's Raw and SmackDown! brand divisions. The concept of the event was based around the backlash from WrestleMania XIX.

This was the first Backlash held under the WWE name after the promotion was renamed from World Wrestling Federation (WWF) to WWE in May 2002. It was also the last Backlash to feature multiple brands until 2007, as beginning with Bad Blood in June, all monthly PPVs outside of the "Big Four" (WrestleMania, SummerSlam, Survivor Series, and Royal Rumble) became brand-exclusive until brand-exclusive PPVs were discontinued after WrestleMania 23 in April 2007. The event grossed US$450,000 with 10,000 ticket sales and had a 0.67 buyrate.

The main event and featured match of the Raw brand was the encounter of Goldberg and The Rock, where Goldberg, in his first WWE pay-per-view, defeated The Rock by pinfall, following a spear and a Jackhammer. The featured match on the undercard was a WWE Championship match from the SmackDown! brand, between John Cena and the reigning champion, Brock Lesnar, where Lesnar defeated Cena by pinfall after an F-5. The other predominant match on the undercard was a six-man tag team match from the Raw brand, between the team of Triple H, Ric Flair, and Chris Jericho facing Shawn Michaels, Kevin Nash, and Booker T with Triple H's World Heavyweight Championship on the line. Triple H, Flair, and Jericho won the match by pinfall, after Triple H hit Nash with a sledgehammer thus retaining his title. The predominant undercard match from the SmackDown! brand was the encounter of the Big Show and Rey Mysterio, where Big Show pinned Mysterio after a chokeslam.

== Production ==
=== Background ===
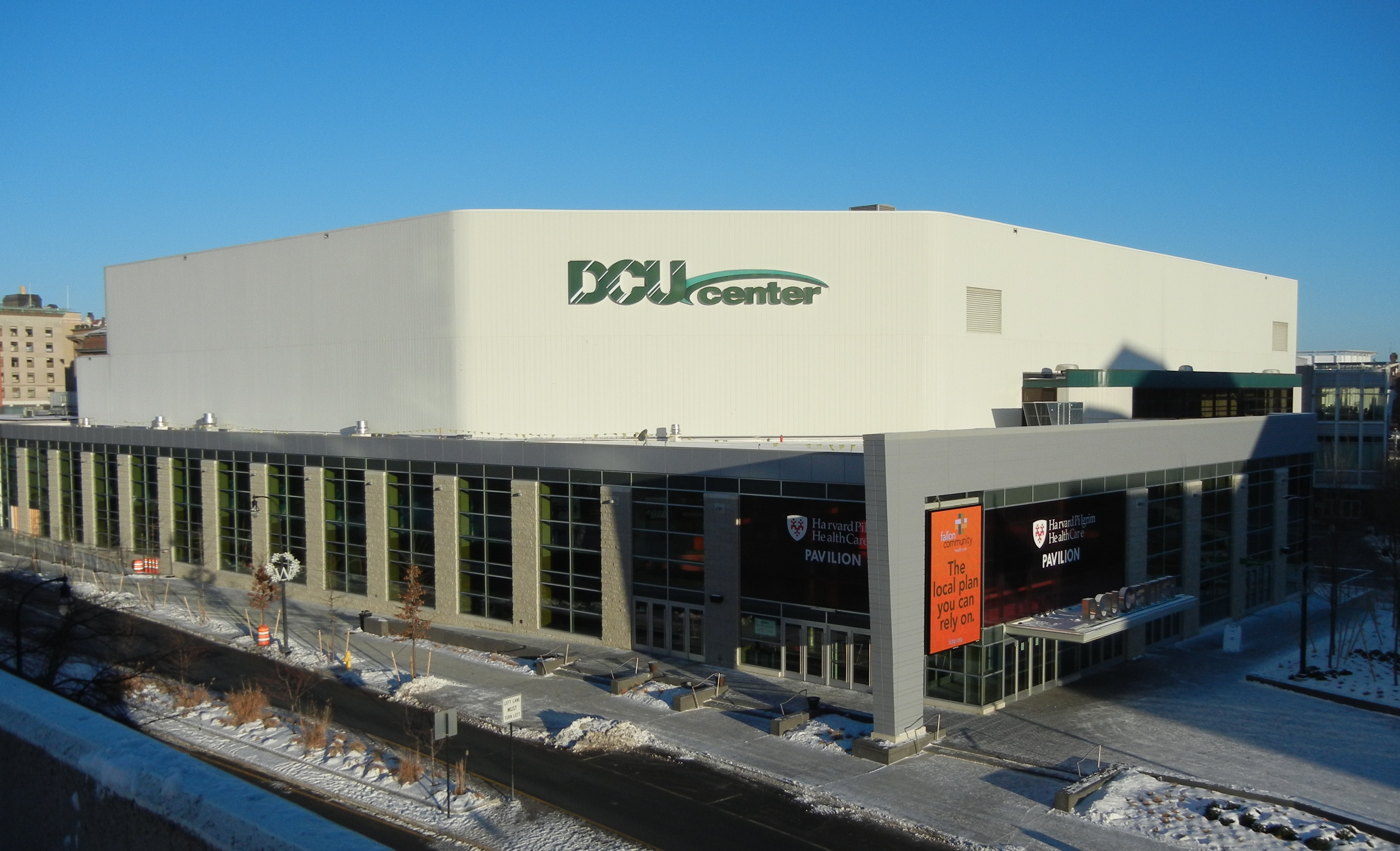
The event was held at the Worcester Centrum in Worcester, Massachusetts.

Backlash is a professional wrestling pay-per-view (PPV) event that was established by World Wrestling Entertainment (WWE) in 1999. The concept is based around the backlash from WWE's flagship event, WrestleMania. The fifth event featured the backlash from WrestleMania XIX. It was scheduled to take place on April 27, 2003, at the Worcester Centrum in Worcester, Massachusetts and was held for wrestlers from the Raw and SmackDown! brand divisions. This was also the first Backlash held under the WWE name after the company changed its name from World Wrestling Federation (WWF) to WWE in May 2002.

=== Storylines ===
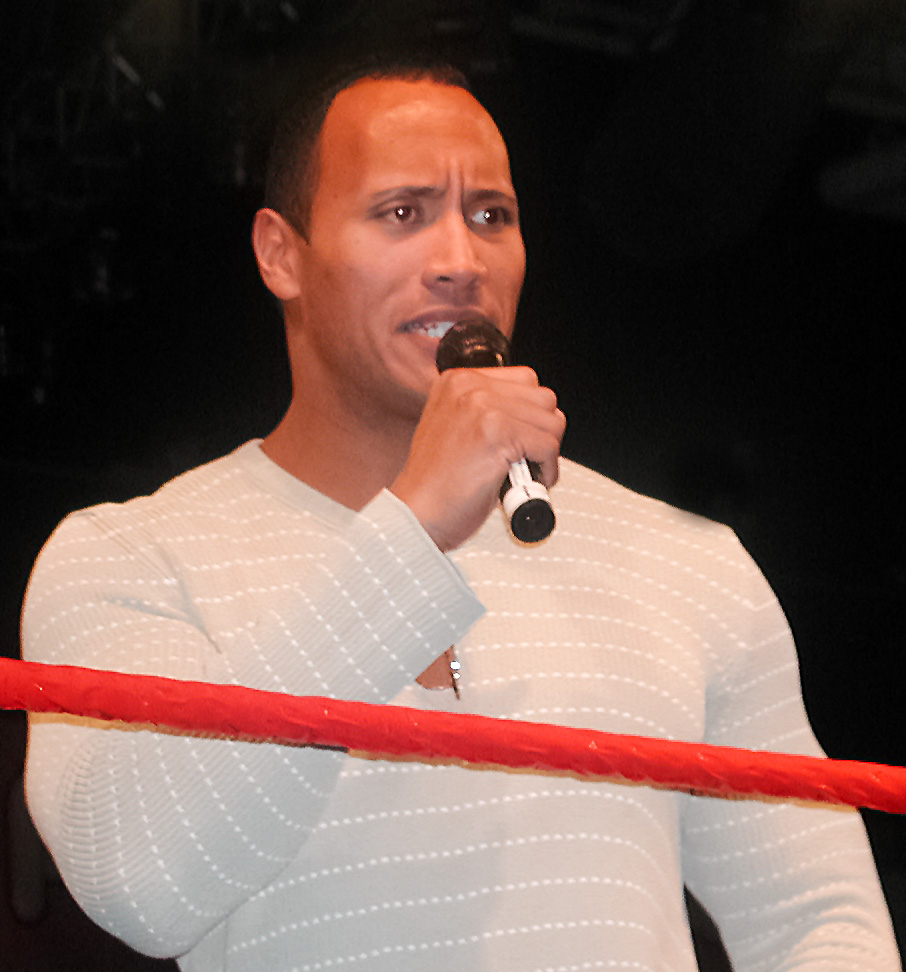
The Rock feuded with Goldberg heading into Backlash

The main event at Backlash was the encounter of Goldberg and The Rock; the main feud from the Raw brand heading into the event. The feud began on the March 31 episode of Raw, where The Rock held a segment entitled Rock Appreciation Night, a segment intended to promote his win against "Stone Cold" Steve Austin at WrestleMania XIX. During the segment, The Rock discussed the list of people he has beaten in his career, including Austin, and proclaimed he was leaving WWE since he had nothing left to accomplish, and because the fans didn't appreciate him anymore. Goldberg then made his WWE debut, as he came down to the ring and stated that he would be The Rock's next challenger. After the confrontation, Goldberg speared The Rock. On the April 7 episode of Raw, Goldberg and The Rock had another confrontation, where Goldberg provoked The Rock into answering his challenge, but The Rock refused. The Rock finally accepted Goldberg's challenge on the April 14 episode of Raw via satellite. On the April 21 episode of Raw, the feud intensified as The Rock held another Rock Concert segment, where he mocked Goldberg with Gillberg, a wrestler whose gimmick was to parody Goldberg. Later into the segment, Goldberg appeared from the audience and entered the ring, only to have The Rock execute a Rock Bottom on him.

The other primary match at Backlash was a WWE Championship match between John Cena and the reigning champion, Brock Lesnar. Their feud began February 13 episode of SmackDown!, during a one-on-one match with Lesnar and Cena, which ended with Lesnar almost ending Cena's career by using the F-5 to propel his leg into the ring post, putting Cena temporarily out of action. At WrestleMania XIX, Lesnar challenged for the WWE Championship held by then-champion Kurt Angle. Toward the end of the match, Lesnar massively botched a shooting star press when he severely underestimated the distance and did not fully rotate his body, slamming his head into Angle's side and ribcage. This stunned Lesnar and he suffered a massive concussion, which forced Angle to improvise the finish of the match. Lesnar then capitalized and regained the WWE title. On the April 3 episode of SmackDown!, General Manager Stephanie McMahon announced a WWE Championship tournament, where the winner would receive a WWE Championship match at Backlash against Lesnar. John Cena, who had recently recovered from his aforementioned leg injury, was involved in the tournament, where he defeated Chris Benoit in the finals on the April 17 episode of SmackDown! to earn a WWE Championship match. On the April 24 episode of SmackDown!, their feud intensified during a main event match involving Lesnar and A-Train, where Cena interfered by breaking a pinfall attempt by Lesnar. After the match, Cena hit Lesnar with his trademark chain and the WWE Championship belt.

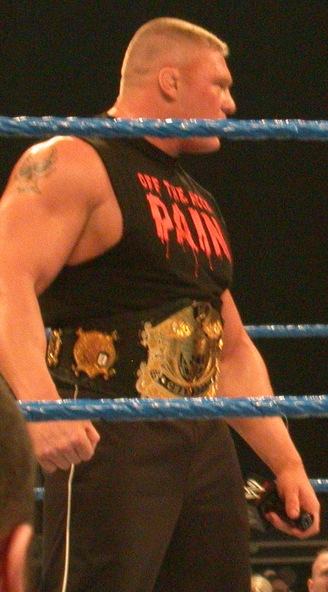
Brock Lesnar defended SmackDown!'s WWE Championship against John Cena at the event.

The main match on the undercard from the Raw brand, was a six-man tag team match involving the team of Triple H, Ric Flair, and Chris Jericho against Shawn Michaels, Kevin Nash, and Booker T. The feud began on the March 31 episode of Raw in a backstage segment, where Booker T was being medically attended to following his World Heavyweight Championship match with Triple H at WrestleMania XIX. Ric Flair came into the scene to confront and taunt Booker T for losing, angering Booker T, who promptly threatened Flair. Later in the night, Jericho cut a promo where he complained that he should have won his match against Michaels at WrestleMania XIX. After the promo, Booker T defeated Jericho in their scheduled match via disqualification after Ric Flair interfered in the match and attacked Booker T. This also brought Triple H down to the ring, and he, Jericho, and Flair attacked Booker T simultaneously. The attack caused Shawn Michaels to come down to the ring to help Booker T to no avail, as Jericho locked Michaels in the Walls of Jericho, while Triple H locked Booker T in an Indian deathlock. On the April 7 episode of Raw, Kevin Nash entered the feud during a main event tag team match with Triple H and Jericho facing Michaels and Booker T. After Booker T pinned Triple H to earn the victory for his team, Flair came into the ring and attacked Booker T, followed by Jericho attacking Michaels with a steel chair. The attack led to the shocking return of Kevin Nash, who had been sidelined with an quadriceps injury, and he attacked Jericho and Flair. After this turn of events, Triple H prepared to hit Nash with a sledgehammer, only to retreat the ring soon afterwards. One week later, Nash said that he wanted himself, Michaels and Triple H to all be friends again, only for Triple H to tell him that he and Michaels could never be friends again. Triple H would go on to suggest that he and Nash should instead side together against Michaels, since it was Michaels who turned on Nash in 1994. This brought Michaels into the ring, and a heated argument ensued between the three. Later that night, Triple H and Flair fought against Booker T and The Hurricane and lost thanks to Michaels. Jericho then attacked Michaels and Nash came to the rescue, but accidentally hit Booker T with the sledgehammer. The feud intensified on the April 21 episode of Raw during a main event World Heavyweight Championship match between Booker T and the reigning champion, Triple H, with Michaels as the special guest referee. During the match, Michaels superkicked Triple H, resulting in Flair and Jericho coming into the ring and attacking Michaels and Booker T. Nash then came down to the ring, where he laid out Jericho and Flair. He also helped Michaels and Triple H back to their feet, only to receive a low blow by Triple H.

The other main match on the undercard from the SmackDown! brand, was the encounter of The Big Show and Rey Mysterio. The feud began on the April 17 episode of SmackDown!, during a tag team match pitting Mysterio and Tajiri against Big Show and A-Train. Big Show and A-Train won the match via pinfall. After the match, however, Tajiri sprayed green mist into A-Train's face, while Mysterio delivered a 619 on Big Show, which caused him to collapse onto the floor. After the match in a backstage segment, Big Show appeared angry with Mysterio for supposedly being embarrassed by him. The feud escalated during the April 24 episode of SmackDown!, during a match between Big Show and Tajiri. After Big Show performed a chokeslam on Tajiri, Mysterio came down to the ring and distracted Big Show, which caused Big Show to chase Mysterio at ringside, resulting in Tajiri winning the match via countout.

== Event ==
Other on-screen personnel
Role:	Name:
English commentators	Jonathan Coachman (Raw)
English commentators	Jerry Lawler (Raw)
English commentators	Michael Cole (SmackDown!)
English commentators	Tazz (SmackDown!)
Spanish commentators	Carlos Cabrera
Spanish commentators	Hugo Savinovich
Interviewers	Lilian Garcia
Interviewers	Terri Runnels
Ring announcers	Howard Finkel (Raw)
Ring announcers	Tony Chimel (SmackDown!)
Referees	Charles Robinson (Raw)
Referees	Nick Patrick (Raw)
Referees	Earl Hebner (Raw)
Referees	Chad Patton (Raw)
Referees	Brian Hebner (SmackDown!)
Referees	Jim Korderas (SmackDown!)
Referees	Mike Sparks (SmackDown!)

=== Sunday Night Heat ===
Before the event aired live on pay-per-view, Scott Steiner defeated Rico in a match on Sunday Night Heat, which aired on TNN.

=== Main card ===
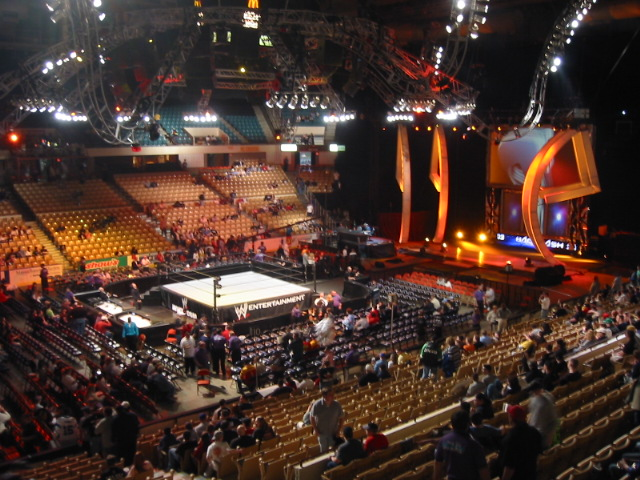
The arena and set of Backlash 2003

The first match was a tag team match for the WWE Tag Team Championship between Los Guerreros (Eddie Guerrero and Chavo Guerrero) and Team Angle (Shelton Benjamin and Charlie Haas). The match began with Team Angle gaining an early advantage over Los Guerreros, after they performed a leapfrog stun gun on Eddie. Benjamin and Haas then prevented Eddie from tagging Chavo into the match for a period of time, but Chavo was eventually tagged into the match, where he gained the advantage over Haas. While Chavo was the legal wrestler in the match, Eddie illegally entered the ring and executed a frog splash on Haas, leading to an unsuccessful pin attempt by Chavo. After the pin attempt, Eddie and Benjamin fought at ringside, where Benjamin tripped Chavo, who was in the ring about to perform a suplex on Haas. Benjamin held Chavo's leg down, allowing Haas to pin Chavo and retain the titles.

The second match was Sean O'Haire (with Roddy Piper) versus Rikishi. O'Haire gained the early advantage, as he clotheslined Rikishi. Rikishi was able to retaliate with a stink face attempt. Piper attempted to hit Rikishi with a coconut, but Rikishi broke it over Piper's head. The distraction allowed O'Haire to perform the Prophecy on Rikishi for a pinfall.

The third match was for the World Tag Team Championship between The Dudley Boyz (Bubba Ray Dudley and D-Von Dudley) and the reigning champions, Kane and Rob Van Dam, with Chief Morley as the special guest referee. The match began with Kane and Van Dam in control of the match, after Kane performed a spinebuster on Bubba Ray. D-Von, though, gained the advantage after delivering a sidewalk slam onto Van Dam. Later in the match, Kane regained control, which proceeded into a chokeslam attempt on Bubba Ray. Morley, however, gave Kane a low blow. Afterwards, Lance Storm attempted to interfere in the match on Kane and Van Dam's behalf, to no avail, which proceeded with a 3-D from The Dudley Boyz onto Morley, thus knocking out the official of the match. The distraction by Morley and Storm allowed Kane to successfully deliver a chokeslam, followed by a Five-Star Frog Splash onto Bubba, into a pinfall officiated by a new referee, to retain the title.

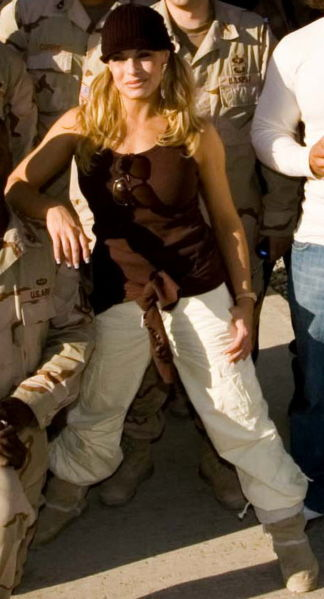
Trish Stratus, Raw's WWE Women's Champion, who defended the title against Jazz at Backlash

The fourth match was for the Women's Championship, where Jazz, who was accompanied by Theodore Long, faced the reigning champion, Trish Stratus. As part of the storyline, Stratus came into the match with injured ribs and was advised not to wrestle by doctors, but was forced to wrestle anyway by Raw General Manager, Eric Bischoff. Both women wrestled a back-and-forth match, until Stratus gained the advantage over Jazz by performing a Stratusfaction (springboard bulldog) on her. During the pin attempt, Long threw his shoe at Stratus's head, causing the pin to be broken. The ending of the match saw Stratus attempting to perform a springboard sunset flip on Jazz, only for Jazz to counter it by sitting on her while grabbing the middle rope to win the title.

The fifth match was Big Show versus Rey Mysterio. Throughout the match, Mysterio used his quickness against Big Show's size advantage, including performing two 619s on Big Show. During a third attempt, Mysterio attempted a West Coast Pop but Big Show countered the move into a chokeslam for the pinfall. After the match, Mysterio was placed and strapped onto a stretcher by EMTs. Big Show picked up the stretcher with Mysterio still on it and slammed it against the ring post, similar to swinging a baseball bat.

The sixth match was for the WWE Championship between John Cena and the reigning champion, Brock Lesnar. Lesnar gained the early advantage over Cena by performing a suplex and slamming Cena's head on the broadcast table. Cena retaliated as he threw Lesnar into the steel steps. Lesnar then delivered a spinebuster on Cena, regaining control of the match. After a spear from Lesnar which sent Cena into the ring corner, Cena attempted to push Lesnar into the referee to no avail. The distraction allowed Cena to hit a low blow on Lesnar. Cena attempted to hit Lesnar with a steel chain, but the referee confiscated the chain before he could use it on Lesnar. The situation allowed Lesnar to perform the F-5 on Cena to retain the title.

The seventh match on the main card was for the World Heavyweight Championship a six-man tag team match between the team of the World Heavyweight Champion Triple H, Ric Flair, and Chris Jericho facing the team of Shawn Michaels, Kevin Nash, and Booker T. Triple H's team took the early advantage, after Triple H illegally entered the ring and performed a Pedigree on Michaels. Michaels' team, however, took control of the match when Nash was tagged in and dominated all three opposers. As Nash wrestled Jericho, Booker T performed the scissors kick on Flair, which proceeded into Nash and Triple H brawling at ringside, Jericho and Booker T brawling at ringside, and Flair and Michaels wrestling in the ring. As Flair and Michaels wrestled, Flair was able to lock in the figure-four leg lock, while Jericho illegally entered the match and performed a Lionsault on Michaels, who was locked in the hold. Nash, who continued to brawl with Triple H at ringside, noticed the turn of events and entered the ring where he delivered a Jackknife Powerbomb on Jericho and threw Flair onto the referee. As the referee was knocked down, Triple H hit Nash with a sledgehammer and pinned him, earning the victory for himself, Flair, and Jericho and also retaining the World Heavyweight Championship.

=== Main event ===
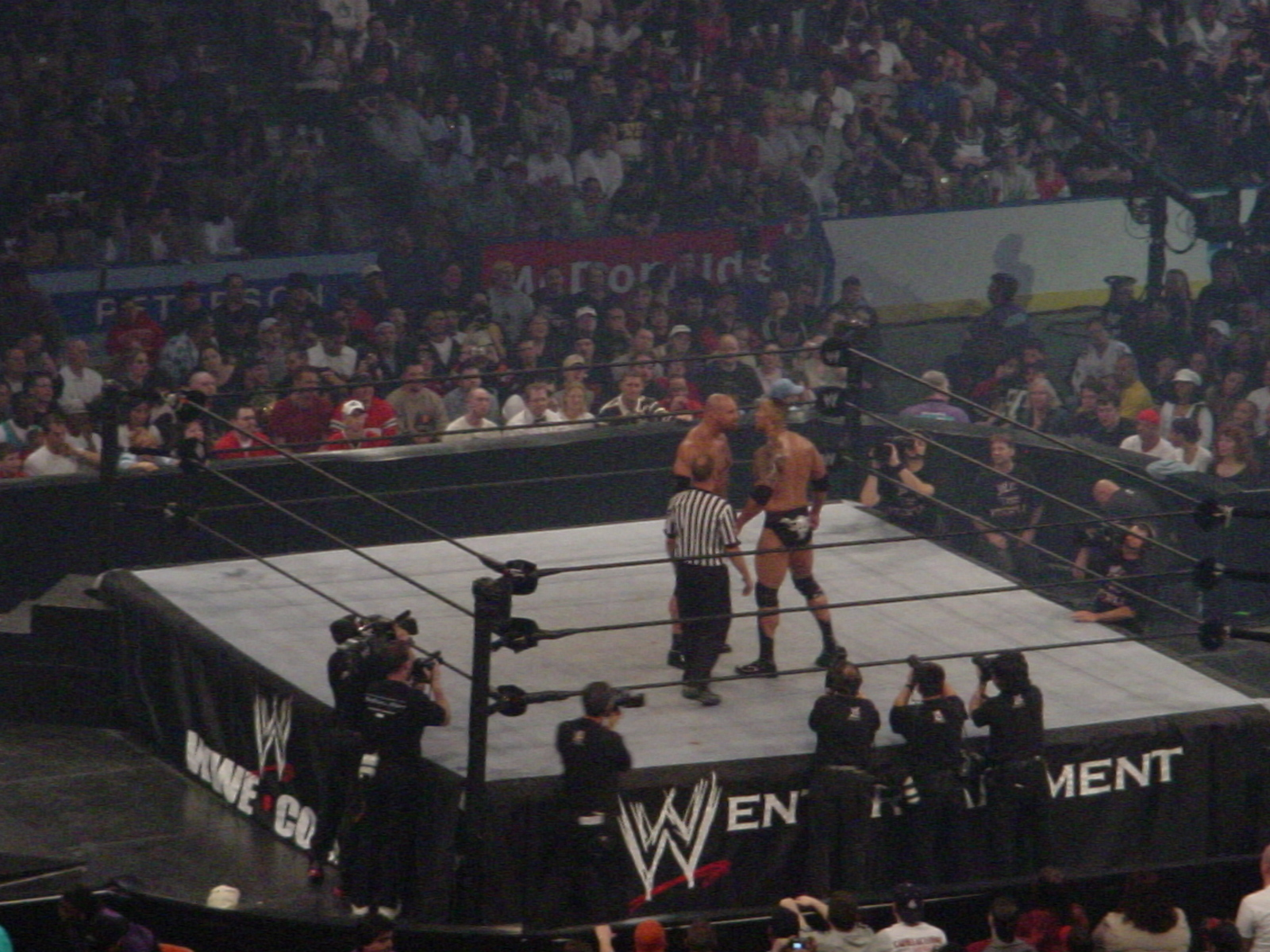
The Rock and Goldberg stare each other down during their match at the event.

In the main event, Goldberg faced The Rock. Early into the match, The Rock taunted Goldberg at ringside to avoid wrestling him. As The Rock reentered the ring, Goldberg performed a Rock Bottom on him to gain the early advantage. Goldberg went for a spear, but The Rock dodged it, resulting in Goldberg hitting the ring post. The Rock took advantage over the situation, as he locked Goldberg in a sharpshooter. Goldberg broke the hold by grabbing the ring ropes. After shoving the referee away and hitting Goldberg with a low blow, The Rock attempted a Rock Bottom, but Goldberg speared him. The Rock was able to perform a spinebuster, Rock Bottom, another spinebuster and a People's Elbow on Goldberg for a near-fall. Afterwards, Goldberg delivered two spears and a Jackhammer for the pinfall.

== Reception ==
Backlash 2003 had 345,000 buys. The event was named the Worst Major Wrestling Show of 2003 by the Wrestling Observer Newsletter. Dave Meltzer's ratings for the event reflect the negative reception, as he rated the WWE Tag Team Championship match the highest at 3 stars. John Cena vs. Brock Lesnar was rated 1.25 stars (which was the same rating received by the heavily criticised main event), the World Tag Team Championship match received 1.75 stars (same as the WWE Women's Championship match), while Big Show vs. Rey Mysterio was rated 1 star. The 6-man tag match was rated 2.5 stars, while the lowest-rated match was Rikishi vs. Sean O' Haire (0.5 stars).

== Aftermath ==
After Backlash, The Rock left WWE to primarily focus on his acting career, as he filmed Walking Tall, a film co-produced by WWE Films, which released in 2004. Goldberg would begin a feud with Chris Jericho beginning on the April 28 episode of Raw, during Jericho's first episode of the Highlight Reel, an interview show, where Goldberg was the guest. During the segment, Jericho stated that no one wanted Goldberg in WWE, especially Jericho. Jericho stated that it was because of Goldberg that Jericho was held down and not given opportunities in World Championship Wrestling, sparking a feud between the two wrestlers. Less than a month later, on the May 12 episode of Raw, a mystery assailant attempted to run over Goldberg as he was sitting in his limousine. The following week on Raw, Co-Raw General Manager "Stone Cold" Steve Austin interrogated several Raw superstars to find out who was the assailant. One of those interrogated was Lance Storm, who admitted that he was guilty. Austin then forced Storm into a match with Goldberg, who defeated Storm via pinfall. After the match, Goldberg forced Storm to admit who put him up to it. Storm admitted that Jericho was the superstar who conspired Storm into running him over. On the May 26 episode of Raw, Goldberg yet again was a guest on the Highlight Reel, where Jericho and Goldberg agreed to a match at Bad Blood. At Bad Blood, Goldberg defeated Jericho via pinfall, after a Jackhammer.

Brock Lesnar engaged in a feud against Big Show over the WWE Championship. The feud began on the May 1 episode of SmackDown!, where Lesnar cut an in-ring promo against Big Show, stating that he was a coward for attacking and injuring Rey Mysterio at Backlash. Big Show later appeared on the stage, where he challenged Lesnar into a WWE Championship match. The following week on SmackDown!, it was announced that Big Show would face Lesnar for the WWE Championship at Judgment Day in a Stretcher match. Later that night, the feud escalated during a Handicap match between Chris Benoit and the team of Big Show and A-Train. Benoit lost via pinfall; after the match, Benoit was double-teamed by Big Show and A-Train. The double-team caused Lesnar to come and assist Benoit to no avail, as Big Show performed a chokeslam on Lesnar. At Judgment Day, Lesnar defeated Big Show in the Stretcher match to retain the WWE Championship.

The aftermath of the six-man tag team match from Backlash, was a feud over the World Heavyweight Championship between Kevin Nash and the reigning champion, Triple H. The feud began on the April 28 episode of Raw, during a tag team match for the World Tag Team Championship involving Triple H and Ric Flair facing the reigning champions, Kane and Rob Van Dam. As Triple H attempted a pinfall on Van Dam, Nash came down to the ring and chased Triple H to the backstage area with a sledgehammer. Triple H then ran towards a limousine, where Nash smashed the windows with the sledgehammer and threw it into the limousine, as it drove off with Triple H. The following week on Raw, Raw Co-General Managers Stone Cold Steve Austin and Eric Bischoff announced a World Heavyweight Championship match between Nash and Triple H at Judgment Day. At Judgment Day, Triple H retained the World Heavyweight Championship after deliberately getting himself disqualified.

The 2003 Backlash would be the final Backlash to feature wrestlers from the SmackDown! brand, and multiple brands in general, until the 2007 event as the next three years's events were held exclusively for the Raw brand. Following WrestleMania 23 in April 2007, brand-exclusive PPVs were discontinued for the rest of the duration of the first brand split.

== Results ==
No.	Results	Stipulations	Times
1^{H}	Scott Steiner defeated Rico	Singles match	2:27
2	Team Angle (Charlie Haas and Shelton Benjamin) (c) defeated Los Guerreros (Chavo Guerrero and Eddie Guerrero)	Tag team match for the WWE Tag Team Championship	15:03
3	Sean O'Haire (with Roddy Piper) defeated Rikishi	Singles match	4:52
4	Kane and Rob Van Dam (c) defeated The Dudley Boyz (Bubba Ray Dudley and D-Von Dudley)	Tag team match for the World Tag Team Championship with Chief Morley as the special guest referee	13:01
5	Jazz (with Theodore Long) defeated Trish Stratus (c)	Singles match for the WWE Women's Championship	5:50
6	Big Show defeated Rey Mysterio	Singles match	3:47
7	Brock Lesnar (c) defeated John Cena	Singles match for the WWE Championship	15:04
8	Chris Jericho, Ric Flair and Triple H defeated Booker T, Kevin Nash and Shawn Michaels	Six-man tag team match	17:51
9	Goldberg defeated The Rock	Singles match	14:03
(c) / – the champion(s) heading into the match; H / – the match was broadcast prior to the pay-per-view on Sunday Night Heat

=== WWE Championship #1 Contender's Tournament bracket ===
1st Round; SmackDown; April 1, 2003 (Aired: April 3)
Chris Benoit	Submission
A-Train	6:55
Big Show	4:13
Rhyno	Disqualification
The Undertaker	Pinfall
Rey Mysterio	3:23
Eddie Guerrero	4:52
John Cena	Pinfall

Semifinals; SmackDown; April 8, 2003 (Aired: April 10)
Chris Benoit	Pinfall
Rhyno	8:11
The Undertaker	14:56
John Cena	Pinfall

Final; SmackDown; April 15, 2003 (Aired: April 17)
Chris Benoit	13:54
John Cena	Pinfall
