= University of Sydney School of Architecture, Design and Planning =

Faculty of the University of Sydney, Australia

Coordinates: 33.8888°S 151.1921°E

Sydney School of Architecture, Design and Planning
- Type: Public
- Established: 1920
- Affiliations: University of Sydney
- Dean: Professor Donald McNeill
- Location: Wilkinson Building, Darlington, New South Wales, Australia
- Campus: Darlington
- Website: sydney.edu.au/architecture

The Sydney School of Architecture, Design and Planning, also known as The University of Sydney School of Architecture, Design and Planning, formerly the Faculty of Architecture, Design and Planning, is a constituent body of the University of Sydney, New South Wales, Australia. The school was established in 1920.

== History ==
From 1880, the study of architecture at the University of Sydney was an elective of the postgraduate and undergraduate engineering degrees. In 1918 the University of Sydney Senate approved the establishment of a School of Architecture within the Faculty of Science, which was enacted in 1920 with Leslie Wilkinson as the chair and then the first dean of architecture. Of the first nine undergraduate students, five were men and four were women.

== Wilkinson Building ==
The Faculty of Architecture, Design and Planning is located in the Wilkinson Building, 148 City Road, Darlington. The building is named after the first dean of the school Leslie Wilkinson.

The Wilkinson Building is an amalgam of two building phases, the first a modest T-shaped building opened in 1959 and major additions completed in 1975. The first building was built from an original sketch plan of the new School of Architecture prepared by the office of Baldwinson, Booth & Peters in November 1957. Documentation drawings were prepared by Eric Andrew and construction commenced in 1958 and completed in 1959. This was the first building to be completed in the University of Sydney's expansion south across City Road into Darlington. Only six years later in 1965 the University Senate approved in principle draft plans for significant alterations and additions to the School of Architecture. Architectural firm McConnel Smith & Johnson has been credited with the initial designs, of which Dean of the School Peter Johnson was a principal. By 1967 the Senate reviewed sketch plans and a brief prepared by the Faculty of Architecture under Johnson, which were to be documented by local firm Fowell Mansfield Jarvis & Maclurcan. The final proposal was documented in 1972 with construction taking place 1973—1975.

The Tin Sheds Gallery is all that remains of the Tin Sheds art workshops, established in 1969 by Donald Brook and Marr Grounds.

== Rankings ==
The Faculty of Architecture, Design and Planning ranked 1st in Australia and 15th in the world for Architecture and Built Environment in the 2017 QS World University Rankings by Subject.

In 2021 the School was ranked first in Australia, ahead of the University of Melbourne and RMIT University in the QS World University Rankings by Subject 2021: Architecture & Built Environment.

== Organisation ==
The school contains four disciplines:

- Discipline of Architecture
- Discipline of Architectural Science
- Discipline of Design
- Discipline of Urban and Regional Planning and Policy

It hosts five research groups:

- Architectural & Building Design
- Architectural & Building Science & Technology
- Architectural History, Theory & Criticism
- Design Lab
- Urbanism

== Former teaching staff ==
- Sir John Sulman (1849—1934): 1887—1912 P.N. Russell lecturer in architecture, 1916—1927 Vernon lecturer in planning
- Leslie Wilkinson OBE (1882—1973): 1918—1947, First Dean and Professor of Architecture at the University of Sydney, Emeritus Professor from 1947. Awarded inaugural RAIA Gold Medal in 1960 and an honorary degree of Doctor of Letters on 2 May 1970, at age 87.
- Joseph Charles Fowell (1891—1970) Awarded RAIA Gold Medal in 1962
- Alfred Samuel Hook (1886—1963): Lecturer from 1922, Associate Professor of Architectural Practice and Construction 1926—1945, Professor of Architectural Practice and Construction 1946—1951 and Faculty Dean 1948—1949 and a founder of the Australian Institute of Architects in 1929
- Henry Ashworth (1907–1991): Chair of Architectural Design and History 1949, Professor of Architecture and Faculty Dean 1950—1963 and jury member of Sydney Opera House competition in 1957. Moved to UNSW in 1964.
- Emeritus Professor (Jack) Henry Jacob Cowan AO (1919—2007): Professor of Architectural Science, 1953—1984 (Considered world's first), honorary degree of Doctor of Architecture conferred at a ceremony held on 13 June 1987.
- Arthur Baldwinson (1908—1969): 1953—1969 Senior Lecturer in town and country planning
- Bruce Rickard (1929—2010): 1957 to early 1960s, lectured in Landscape Architecture
- Denis Winston CBE (1908—1980): 1949—1977, first professor of Town Planning, established Planning Research Centre in 1964, Faculty Dean 1964–1965, (Architecture Library named after him)
- Peter Johnson AC (1923–2003): Professor of Architecture and head of the school of undergraduate studies between 1968–1986
- Lloyd Rees AC CMG (1895—1988): 1946—1986
  (awarded University of Sydney Union Medal in 1988)
- Ross Thorne: Professor of Architecture and Architectural History, social and architectural history lecturer from 1961, Associate Professor from 1973, Doctorate 1997
- John James AO (1931—): Lecturer in Medieval architecture and Design Studio, 1966—2007
- Marr Grounds (1930—2021): 1968—1987, and co–founder of Tin Sheds Gallery
- George Molnar OBE AO (1910—1998):Lecturer 1945—1985
- Lawrence Nield: Professor 1992—1996
- Jennifer Taylor (1935—2015): Lecturer, Academic, Professor and Adjunct Professor, 1970—1998
- Col James (1936–2013): Senior lecturer, 1970s to 2009
- Roger Pegrum: Associate Professor of Architecture, 1974—1986
- Adrian Snodgrass (1931—2025): Professor of Architecture 1981—1997
- Swetik Korzeniewski (9 May 1946—6 March 2024): Lecturer, tutor, Italian renaissance and baroque architecture, 1972—2001
- Anna Rubbo: Associate Professor, 1997—2012: Lecturer and project leader of the Global Studio and co-founded the Architectural Theory Review journal with Adrian Snodgrass and edited from 1996—2011
- Paul Pholeros AM (1953–2016): Adjunct Professor of Architecture
- Michael Tawa: Professor of Architecture, 2010—2023

== Notable graduates ==
- Emil Sodersten (1899—1961): attended lectures by Wilkinson, 1921
- Heather Sutherland (1903—1953): BArch 1926
- Eleanor Cullis-Hill (1913—2001): BArch 1938
- Bill Lucas (1924—2001): BArch (Hons) 1946
- Ruth (Harvey) Lucas (1926—): BArch late 1940s
- Bryce Mortlock AM (1921—2004): BArch 1950 (Hons 1) (University Medal) DArch (Honorary Doctor of Architecture, University of Melbourne)
  Awarded RAIA Gold Medal in 1979.
- Robert Woodward AM (1923—2010): BArch (Hons) 1952
- Neville Gruzman AM (1925—2015): BArch 1952
- George Clarke (1932—2005): BArch 1953
- Peter Johnson AC (1923—2003): BArch 1953
  Awarded RAIA Gold Medal in 1985.
- Harry Howard (1930—2000): BArch 1953, DipTCPlan 1960
- Ken Woolley AM (1933—2015): BArch 1955
  Awarded RAIA Gold Medal in 1993.
- Peter Hall (1931—1995): BArch 1957, B Arts 1958, Architect for the Sydney Opera House interiors`
- John Andrews AO (1933—2023): BArch 1957, DArch 1988 (Honorary Doctor of Architecture)
  Awarded RAIA Gold Medal in 1980.
- Michael Dysart AO (1934—2026): B.Arch 1958
- Nino Sydney: B.Arch 1958
- Philip Cox AO (1939—): BArch 1962, DipTCPlan 1971
  Awarded RAIA Gold Medal in 1984.
- Louise Cox AO (1939—): BArch 1963, DipTCPlan 1971
- Lawrence Nield (1941—): BArch, 1963
  Awarded RAIA Gold Medal in 2012.
- Penelope Seidler AO (1938—): B.Arch 1964 DArch (Honorary Doctor of Architecture), 2021
- Richard Leplastrier AO (1939—): BArch 1963.
  Awarded RAIA Gold Medal in 1999.
- Andrew Andersons AO (1942—): BArch 1964 (University Medal)
- John James OAM (1931—): Master of Building Science, 1966
- Chris Johnson (1945—): BSc(Arch), BArch, New South Wales Government Architect 1995—2005
- Imants Tillers (1950—): BSc(Arch) 1973 (University Medal)
- Alexander Tzannes AM (1950—): BSc(Arch) 1974, BArch 1976
  Awarded RAIA Gold Medal in 2018.
- Geoffrey Atherden AM: BArch (later screenwriter, playwright and writer of Mother and Son)
- Andrea Nield (1951—): BSc(Arch) 1974, BArch (Hons) 1977
- Paul Pholeros AM (1953—2016): BSc(Arch) 1974, BArch (Hons 1) 1976
- Helen Lochhead AO: BSc(Arch) (Hons1), BArch (Hons1)
- Oi Choong: BSc(Arch), BArch
- Richard Francis-Jones (1960—): BSc(Arch) 1981, BArch 1985 (University Medal)
- Adrian Snodgrass (1931—2025): MSc (Arch) 1981, The Symbolism of the Stupa, and Architecture, Time and Eternity: PhD 1985
- Peter Poulet (1960—): BSc(Arch) 1981, B.Arch, 1984, New South Wales Government Architect 2012—2018
- Caroline Pidcock: BSc(Arch), BArch (Hons) 1987
- Nick Murcutt (1964—2011): BArch 1989
- Rachel Neeson: BSc(Arch) 1990, BArch 1994 (University Medal)
- Gerard Reinmuth: BArch 1996
- Laura Harding: BSc(Arch) 1995, BArch 1998
