= Bruce Rickard =

Australian architect and landscape architect

- Born: Bruce Arthur Lancelot Rickard; 1 December 1929; Roseville, Sydney, Australia
- Died: 22 September 2010 (aged 80); Sacred Heart Hospice, Sydney, Australia
- Education: Sydney Technical College; University College London; University of Pennsylvania
- Occupations: Architect, landscape architect
- Years active: 1957—2009
- Known for: Sydney School
- Children: 7 (including 1 step-child)
- Parent(s): Arthur and Myfanwy Rickard
- Relatives: Stanley Rickard
- Awards: New South Wales Enduring Architecture Award 2009
- Practice: Bruce Rickard and Associates
- Buildings: Rickard House 1 & 2, Curry House 2

Bruce Rickard (1 December 1929 – 22 September 2010; born Bruce Arthur Lancelot Rickard) was an Australian architect and landscape architect.

Throughout his career, he was involved with the production of commercial, landscape and urban planning projects, but much of his work was residential, including the design of more than 80 family homes around the north shore and northern beaches of Sydney.

He was one of the longest-serving Chapter Councillors with the Australian Institute of Architects, serving 16 years, and a founding member of the Australian Institute of Landscape Architects.

He was the first Australian to be awarded a Masters in Landscape Architecture.

== Early life ==
=== Childhood ===
Rickard was born on 1 December 1929 in Roseville, Sydney, to Arthur Lancelot Rickard and his wife Myfanwy. He grew up with his family, including his siblings, at their 5 acre property in Turramurra, who then moved to a small flat in Roseville during World War II. He attended Barker College, a boys' private school in the nearby suburb of Hornsby.

== Education ==
In 1947, Rickard began his architectural studies at Sydney Technical College. Whilst studying, he was offered a full-time job as a junior by his great-uncle, fellow architect Harry Ruskin Rowe, son of Thomas Rowe, with the promise of a partnership with his firm. Rickard continued working for Rowe until 1949, when he began working as a junior for Sydney Ancher. He stayed in the job until 1953, and was able to complete his first residential design project within this time.

He completed his Diploma of Architecture in 1954 and subsequently left for Europe, where he spent his time exploring architecture and working in London. Whilst in London, he began studying Landscape Design at University College London, however the course was more horticulture-based rather than landscape design which led to him accepting a fellowship in the United States, where he began studying a Master of Landscape Architecture at the University of Pennsylvania under Ian McHarg, a Scottish landscape architect who founded the department of landscape architecture at the Institution. His other tutors were Philip Johnson, Louis Kahn, and Lewis Mumford.

== Career ==
After spending several years in America, Rickard returned to Australia in 1957 where he lectured in landscape architecture in Denis Winston's Town Planning course at the University of Sydney while setting up his architectural firm – Bruce Rickard and Associates, Architects, Landscape Architects and Urban Architects.

In 1967, together with Harry Howard and Allan Correy, he became a founding member of the Australian Institute of Landscape Architects.

Throughout his career, Rickard designed more than 80 houses, mainly single-family dwellings, as well as car washes, a drive-in restaurant, a church, several schools, several project homes, medium-density housing developments and coastal town developments.

== Death ==
Rickard died at the Sacred Heart Hospice in St Vincent's Hospital, Sydney on 22 September 2010 from non-Hodgkin lymphoma.
