= Sydney School =

Australian architectural style

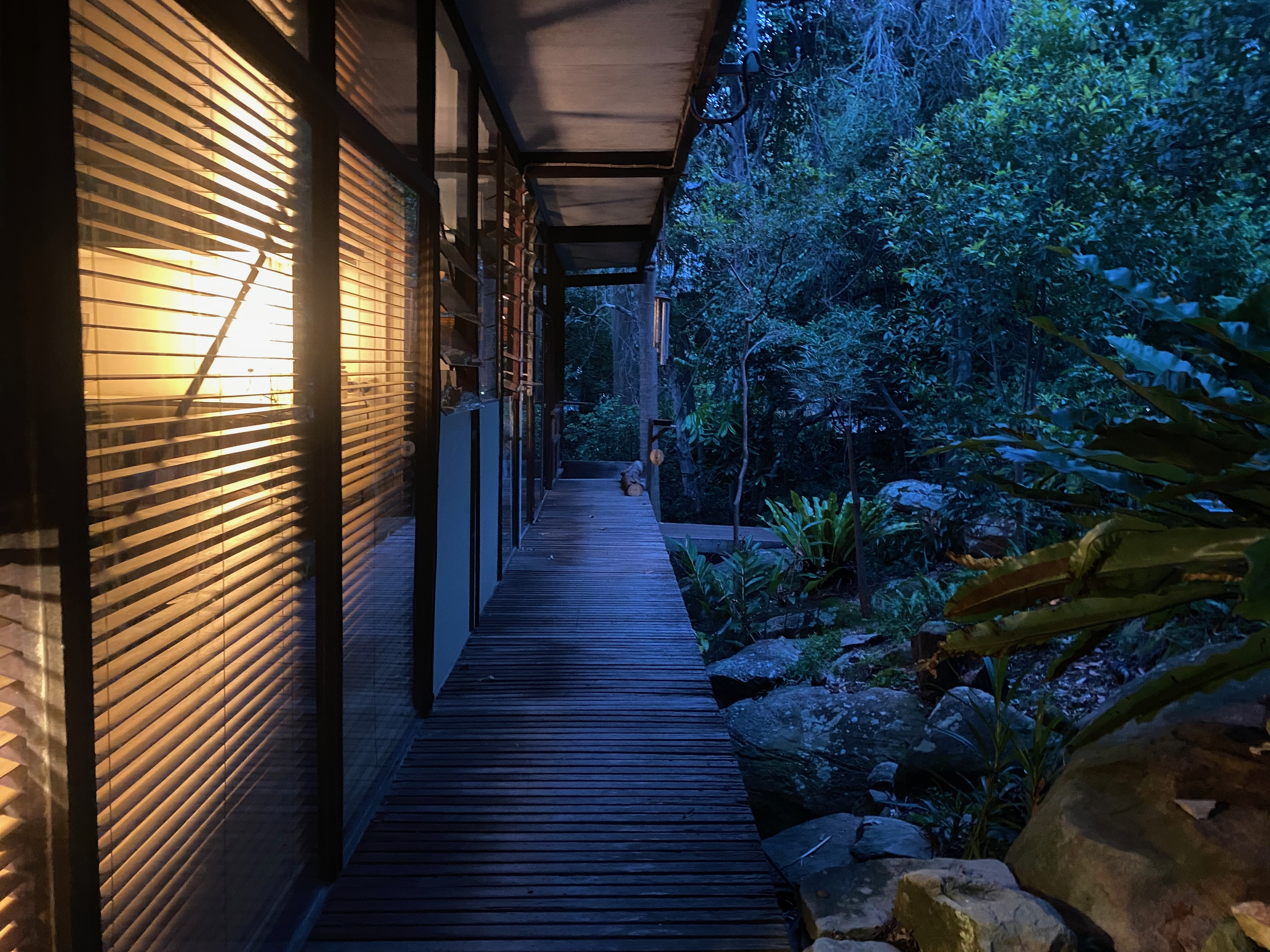
- The Glass House, 1957 by Bill and Ruth Lucas
- Years active: 1950s–1970s
- Location: Sydney, Australia
- Major figures: Peter Muller, Bruce Rickard, Bill Lucas, Ken Woolley, Neville Gruzman, Ian McKay, Russell Jack et.al.
- Influences: Nature, landscape, raw materials, Japanese and Scandinavian architecture, Alvar Aalto, Frank Lloyd Wright
- Influenced: 'Sydney Bush School' of landscape architecture, Pettit & Sevitt houses (Sydney and Canberra), Merchant Builders houses (Melbourne), Graeme Gunn, Glenn Murcutt, Peter Stutchbury

The Sydney School, sometimes referred to as 'nuts and berries style', describes an architectural typology and approach developed by a peer group of architects in Sydney, Australia who were reacting against international Modernism with their own regionalist style, over a period from the mid–1950s to the mid–1970s. In contrast to the purism of the international modernist style, they were drawn to the natural environment, topography, rustic materials, clinker bricks, low gutter lines, and often raked roof lines. The architectural approach drew from a number of influences including Japanese and Scandinavian architecture and particularly the work of architects Alvar Aalto and Frank Lloyd Wright.

== Background ==
=== First use of the term ===
The term 'Sydney School' is thought to be first described in an illustrated article by Milo Dunphy, published in the magazine 'Hemisphere' in August 1962, titled 'The Growth of an Australian Architecture'.

A large number of other young architects in Sydney are working in this same simple vein. Bill Lucas, Bruce Rickard, lan McKay, Peter Muller, Peter Kollar, Tony Moore, Russell Jack and Neville Gruzman are some of the more prominent names in what may soon be regarded as the Sydney School, one which is at least as distinctive as the Bay Region architecture of California.

— Milo Dunphy, Architect, Sydney (1962)

== Architects of the 'Sydney School' ==
A number of architectural critics and writers including Milo Dunphy, Jennifer Taylor and Robin Boyd referred to a loose grouping of individual architects considered to be of the 'Sydney School' approach, including among others, Peter Muller, Bill Lucas, Bruce Rickard, Bryce Mortlock, John Allen, Russell Jack, John James, Neville Gruzman, Peter Johnson, Ian McKay, Keith Cottier, Michael Dysart, Don Gazzard, Ken Woolley and Philip Cox.

Other architects including Adrian Snodgrass, Peter Kollar, Ross Thorne, Hugh Buhrich and Terry Donnough are considered fringe members of the 'School', through architectural approach or by moving into other professional positions or academic and teaching roles, and often designing few other buildings during the corresponding period.

=== '15 Houses by Sydney Architects' exhibition 1961 ===
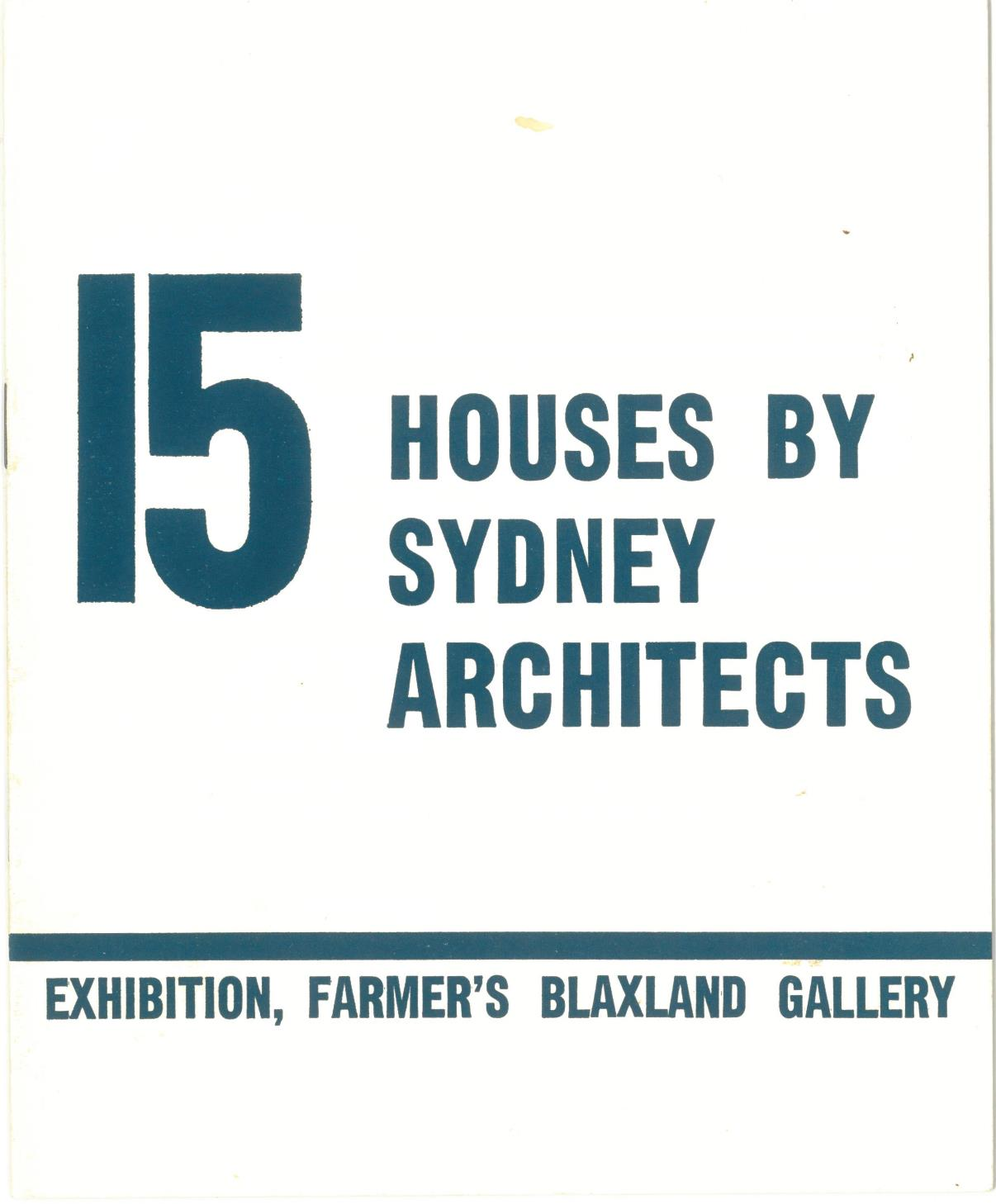
Exhibition catalogue, 1961

In 1961 an exhibition of a new contemporary style of Sydney architecture curated by Bruce Roberston was displayed at the Blaxland Gallery on level nine of Farmers department store on George Street, Sydney for two weeks (23 August to 5 September). The exhibition titled 15 Houses by Sydney Architects was a collection of contemporary architecturally designed houses, organised by the NSW Chapter of the Royal Australian Institute of Architects and the Museum of Modern Art, Melbourne, where it was exhibited later in the same month retitled as Modern Sydney Domestic Architecture, where it was reviewed by Melbourne architect Neil Clerehan, and later referred to by his local colleague, architect, writer and critic Robin Boyd.

The 15 individual architects or firms in the exhibition included John Allen and Russell C. Jack; Ancher, Mortlock & Murray; Max Collard & Guy Clarke; Neville Gruzman; John James; L. Peter Kollar; James Kell of Powell, Mansfield and Maclurcan; W.E. (Bill) Lucas and Ruth Lucas; Ian McKay; Peter Muller; Bruce Rickard; Ross Thorne; Harry Seidler; Andrew Young (Duffield Young Associates) and Bruce S. Robertson (exhibition curator). All of the houses exhibited were located north of Sydney Harbour on the North Shore or Northern Beaches of Sydney. This initial grouping of work by mostly emerging Sydney architects and housing styles is a key influence in the early identification of a contemporary and regionally specific architecture.

15 Houses by Sydney Architects (1961 exhibition, Farmer's Blaxland Gallery)
No.	Architect	House (street/address)	Location (suburb)	Builder
1	John Allen and Russell C. Jack (Russell Jack)	28 Trentino Road (Palmer House 1960)	Turramurra	C.H. & C.R. Ellis
2	Ancher, Mortlock & Murray (Sydney Ancher)	15 Bogota Avenue (Ancher House III, 1957)	Neutral Bay	O'Brien & Daniel Pty. Ltd.
3	Max Collard & Guy Clarke	—	Dee Why	Warren R. Bowden
4	Neville Gruzman	2 Mary Street (Benjamin House, 1960)	Longueville	W. Stokes & Son Pty. Ltd.
5	John James	33 Woolwich Road (Rae Mainsbridge House, 1961)	Hunters Hill	Leo Marks
6	L. Peter Kollar	Beatty Street	Balgowlah	L.S. Booth
7	James Kell (of Powell, Mansfield and Maclurcan)	19A Philip Road	Mona Vale	W. Miles
8	W.E. Lucas and Ruth Lucas	— (The Glass House, 1957)	Castlecrag	B. E. Sewell
9	Ian McKay	57a Lucinda Avenue (McKay House 1960)	Wahroonga	Ian McKay
10	Peter Muller	265 Edinburgh Road (Audette House, 1953)	Castlecrag	V.R. & J. Constructions
11	Bruce Rickard	51 Finlay Road (Rickard House I, 1959)	Warrawee	Bruce Rickard
12	Bruce S. Robertson	Richmond Road (Robertson House, 1953–1960, demolished 2000)	Seaforth	Aspect Pty. Ltd.
13	Ross Thorne	(Thorne House, First Rock, 1959)	St. Ives (north)	A.C. McDowell Pty. Ltd.
14	Harry Seidler	— (Waks House II, Minimbah Road, 1959)	Northbridge	J. Pringle
15	Andrew Young (Duffield Young Associates)	Ogilvy Road	Clontarf	Messrs. Grimson & Rose

=== List of architects of the 'Sydney School' ===
Architects considered to be of the 'Sydney School'
Name	Born	Birthplace	Service & Education	Influences	Mentors/Colleagues
Bryce Mortlock	14 October 1921	Sydney	RAAF Pilot (1942–1945), University of Sydney (1946–1950)		Sydney Ancher, Ken Woolley
Peter Johnson	15 December 1923	Armadale, Victoria	RAAF Pilot (1942–1945) University of Sydney		Kenneth McConnel
Bill Lucas	31 December 1924	Sydney	RAAF Air Crew (1943–1946), University of Sydney (1943–1946)	Frank Lloyd Wright	1955 to 1957, he joined the Design Group with Neville Gruzman, Ruth Harvey and Tony Moore, Milo Dunphy
Neville Gruzman	14 November 1925	Sydney	University of Sydney (1946–1950)	Frank Lloyd Wright, Japanese architecture	Bill and Ruth Lucas, Pettit & Sevitt houses
Russell Jack	1925	Sydney	RAAF, Sydney Technical College (1946–1951)		John Allen, Keith Cottier, Petitt & Sevitt houses
John Allen	1926	Sydney	University of Sydney		Russell Jack, Keith Cottier
Peter Muller	3 July 1927	Adelaide	University of Adelaide (1945–1948), University of Pennsylvania (1951–1952)	Frank Lloyd Wright, Japanese architecture	Adrian Snodgrass, Albert Read
Donald Gazzard	4 August 1929	Sydney	University of Sydney (1947–1950)	Bauhaus	Harry Seidler, George Clarke, Petitt & Sevitt houses
Bruce Rickard	1 December 1929	Sydney	Sydney Technical College, University College London, University of Pennsylvania (1947–1954)	Frank Lloyd Wright	Sydney Ancher, Neville Gruzman, Ian McKay, Tony Moore, Harry Howard, Bruce Mackenzie, Allan Correy
John James	1931	London	University of Melbourne (1949–1953); University of Sydney (1963–1966); University of NSW, 1988 PhD	Frank Lloyd Wright	Roy Grounds, Robin Boyd, Frederick Romberg, Fritz Janeba, Bruce Mackenzie
Adrian Snodgrass	2 April 1931	Kyogle	East Sydney Technical College, later University of Sydney	Asian architecture (widely travelled in Asia 1957—1967)	John James, Peter Muller, Bruce Rickard, Bert Read, Neville Gruzman
Ian McKay	1932	Sydney	University of New South Wales	Frank Lloyd Wright, Japanese architecture	Philip Cox, Neville Gruzman, Tony Moore, Milo Dunphy, Bruce Rickard
Ken Woolley	29 May 1933	Sydney	University of Sydney (1951–1955)		Sydney Ancher, Michael Dysart, Bryce Mortlock, Peter Webber, Peter Hall, Harry Rembert's Design Room at Government Architects Branch (Manifesto of Natural Materialism), Neil Clerehan, Pettit & Sevitt houses
Michael Dysart	8 April 1934	Brighton, United Kingdom	University of Sydney (1955–1958)		Ken Woolley, Peter Webber, Peter Hall, Harry Rembert's Design Room at Government Architects Branch, Pettit & Sevitt houses
Keith Cottier	1938	Sydney	Sydney Technical College (1954–1959)		John Allen, Russell Jack
Philip Cox	1 October 1939	Sydney	University of Sydney (1957–1962)		Ian McKay

== Locations ==
=== Sydney's North Shore and Northern Beaches ===
Typical Sydney School houses were predominantly located on the city's North Shore such as the Woolley House in Mosman. Other popular suburbs on the lower and upper north shore included Castlecrag, Northbridge, Hunters Hill, Turramurra, Wahroonga and the Northern Beaches, like Mona Vale, Whale Beach and Palm Beach. These suburbs generally had a good supply of more dramatic, steeper and harder–to–build–on blocks that were located adjacent to bushland and waterways, or both. With increasing affluence and car ownership these once remote locations were within easy access of jobs and schools in North Sydney and Sydney CBD.

A majority of the architects also ran their practices on the North Shore, particularly in North Sydney CBD. Ancher Mortlock Murray and Woolley were initially in Mount Street, then at 10 Ridge Street from 1966. From 1969 a shared office across the road at 7 Ridge Street, North Sydney included architects Bruce Rickard, Ian McKay and Harry Howard, along with Harry Seidler, Peter Myers, influential designer Gordon Andrews, graphic designers Harry Williamson and Roger Roberts and architectural photographer David Moore. Bruce Mackenzie's landscape design and contracting practice also operated from there and it grew into Sydney's first full time private landscape architecture practices. Together with landscape architect Allan Correy and Harry Howard, Bruce Mackenzie and Bruce Rickard are credited as the founding figures of the parallel 'Sydney Bush School' of landscape architecture, working out of 7 Ridge Street from 1969 to 1977. In 1973 Harry Seidler moved his office to Glen Street, Milsons Point with harbour views. Other architects had offices in Cammeray, Crows Nest, Roseville and Seaforth. Neville Gruzman was always based in the Eastern Suburbs, firstly Darling Point, then Double Bay.

=== Sydney's Eastern Suburbs ===
To a lesser extent some Sydney School style houses and buildings were built in the Eastern Suburbs of Sydney in the hillier suburbs like Edgecliff, Point Piper, Darling Point and Woollahra, although these were rarely located adjacent to bushland.

=== Canberra ===
A number of Sydney School architects also designed buildings in Canberra in the 1960s and 1970s on similar types of sites as those in Sydney, often with sloping terrain and original endemic landscape. Architects including Bryce Mortlock, Ken Woolley, Russell Jack, Michael Dysart and Ian McKay all had work completed in Canberra in this period. The 1965 built Cater House at Mugga Way, Red Hill by Russell Jack of Allen, Jack and Cottier is considered one of the leading examples of the Sydney School built in Canberra, winning the 1965 Canberra Medallion. Important examples of medium density housing include Swinger Hill by Ian McKay and Partners, Cook Aranda Housing Cooperative at Wybalena Grove and Urambi Village both by Michael Dysart. From 1966 the Sydney-based project home builders Pettit and Sevitt built over 500 homes in Canberra with designs by 'Sydney School' architects Ken Woolley and Michael Dysart, located in the new suburbs of Belconnen, Tuggeranong, Weston Creek and Woden Valley.

The 1967 designed offices and headquarters of the Royal Australian Institute of Architects in Mugga Way, Red Hill designed by Bryce Mortlock from Ancher, Mortlock, Murray and Woolley, is a prime example of the Sydney School approach to domestic architecture applied to a larger built form. Completed in 1970s and built of white painted brick walls, dark tiled raked roofs and a courtyard form, with oiled timber interiors, on a more difficult site is highly typical of the style. The choice of architect and type of building for the Institute's head office extols the rise and importance of the regional architectural approach in the mid-1960s and early 1970s.

Architect Roger Pegrum is considered the most closely associated Canberra architect to the Sydney School. In the 1960s and 1970s he designed dozens of houses with a similar approach in Woden Valley, inner Belconnen and Weston Creek in suburbs like Aranda, Farrer, Mawson, Red Hill. He was using a very Sydney School palette of materials, landscape and forms on his residential projects of this time, and in the early 1970s designed houses for Manor Homes, which was established as a direct competitor to Pettit and Sevitt. By 1974 he had taken an Associate Professor role at the University of Sydney.

=== Snowy Mountains ===
The alpine villages of Thredbo and Perisher are also notable for the many ski lodges designed in Sydney School style including buildings by Peter Muller, Harry Seidler and Bill Lucas.

=== Melbourne ===
Following the exhibition of 15 Sydney Houses in Melbourne in 1961, there is a minor and contested element of influence on new local housing there in the 1960s and 1970s, with architects like Neil Clerehan, Graeme Gunn, Robin Boyd and the Merchant Builders project home company employing similar materials, forms and planning, along with a new interest in more natural settings, materials and native gardens. Elliston Estate in Rosanna (1968–1971) has common approaches to housing as seen on the North Shore of Sydney, surround by endemic gardens and parklands designed by Ellis Stones. Similar influences such as Scandinavian and Japanese architecture, Walter Burley Griffin, Frank Lloyd Wright and Mies van der Rohe are also acknowledged, if not the direct influence of Sydney architects.

== Common architectural elements and materials ==
Influenced by Walter Burley Griffin's work in the Sydney suburb of Castlecrag, this style of Australian architecture was visually responsive to the natural environment and, like Griffin, often utilised natural local materials as structural and landscape elements. The following list identifies common architectural materials, siting and massing approaches:

- Endemic natural landscape setting
- Roof forms follow slope of the site
- Split level planning
- Asymmetrical massing of form
- Terracotta tiled skillion roofs
- Exposed rafters and beams
- Timber post and beam construction
- Stained or oiled internal timber
- Built in joinery
- Outdoor timber decks and courtyards
- Painted brickwork or clinker brick walls
- Stone walls
- Clerestory windows
- Timber awning sashes
- Large glass and timber sliding doors

=== Flat roofs or pitched roofs ===
There were two strongly identifiable differences in housing style, principally in the roof design. The earlier more modernist architects preferred flat roof forms, including Sydney Ancher, Peter Muller, Bill and Ruth Lucas, and Neville Gruzman. A second group principally employed pitched roofs with strong angular forms and low eaves, including Peter Johnson, Ken Woolley, Don Gazzard, Michael Dysart, Ian McKay, Bruce Rickard and Keith Cottier.

=== Painted brick or natural brick ===
Another identifiable material in the palette was masonry brickwork, with architects using either painted or whitewashed brickwork in a European style, or alternatively in a natural, fired clinker brick, taking advantage of a new ranges of brick types, colours, styles and textures that were on the market.

== 'Sydney School' houses ==
Key Sydney School houses by year completed
Year	Architect	Project	Location	Notes	Notes/RAIA awards
1953	Peter Muller	Audette House	265 Edinburgh Road, Castlecrag		
1954	Peter Muller	Bynya House	42 Bynya Road, Whale Beach		
1954	John Lindsay Sever	Sever House	34 Barons Crescent, Hunters Hill		
1955	Bill Lucas	Kearns House	Sylvania		
1955	Peter Muller	Walcott House	40 Bynya Road, Whale Beach		Arts and Architecture, House of the Year, 1956
1957	Russell Jack	Jack House	62 Boundary Road, Wahroonga		Sir John Sulman Medal, 1957
1957	Sydney Ancher	Ancher House III	15 Bogota Avenue, Neutral Bay		
1957	Bill and Ruth Lucas	The Glass House	80 The Bulwark, Castlecrag		New South Wales Enduring Architecture Award, 2024; Heritage Architecture Award (Conservation), 2024 (NSW); Built Heritage Award (Small Scale), 2024, National Trust NSW; Lachlan Macquarie Award for Heritage Architecture, 2024; Note: 2024 awards presented to Cracknell & Lonergan Architects for heritage work
1958	Neville Gruzman	Gruzman House	4–8 Oswald Street, Darling Point		
1958	Bruce Rickard	Cohen House	23 Rembrandt Drive, Middle Cove		
1959	Bruce Rickard	Rickard House I (later Evatt House)	51 Finlay Road, Warrawee		
1959	Arthur Baldwinson	Simpson-Lee House I	23 Roland Avenue, Wahroonga		
1959	Ross Thorne	Thorne House (First Rock)	St Ives		
1960	Neville Gruzman	Benjamin House	2 Mary Street, Longueville		
1960	Frank Cavalier	Own House	10 Thorn Street, Hunters Hill		
1960	Ian McKay	McKay House	Wahroonga		
1960	Russell Jack	Palmer House	28 Trentino Road, Turramurra		
1961	Donald Gazzard	Herbert Residence	12 Ellesmore Avenue, Hunters Hill		Wilkinson Award, 1961
1962	Bruce Rickard	Rickard House II	10 Kokoda Avenue, Turramurra		
1962	Ken Woolley	Woolley House (later Hesketh House)	34 Bullecourt Avenue, Mosman		Wilkinson Award, 1962; New South Wales Enduring Architecture Award, 2022; National Award for Enduring Architecture, 2022
1963	Allen Jack and Cottier (Russell Jack)	Jacobs Residence	36 Cleveland Street, Wahroonga		Wilkinson Award, 1963
1964	Peter Johnson	RN Johnson Residence	29 Greville Street, West Chatswood		Wilkinson Award, 1964
1966	John James	John & Hilary James House	26 Musgrave Street, Mosman		
1969	Philip Cox	Hawkins Residence	19 Norma Crescent, Cheltenham		Wilkinson Award, 1969
1969	Frank Cavalier	Cavalier Residence	16 Lloyd Avenue, Hunters Hill		
1972	Hugh Buhrich	Buhrich House II	375 Edinburgh Road, Castlecrag	late	
1976	Richard Leplastrier	Palm Grove House	Bilgola	late	National Award for Enduring Architecture, 2020; New South Wales Enduring Architecture Award, 2020

== Other buildings ==
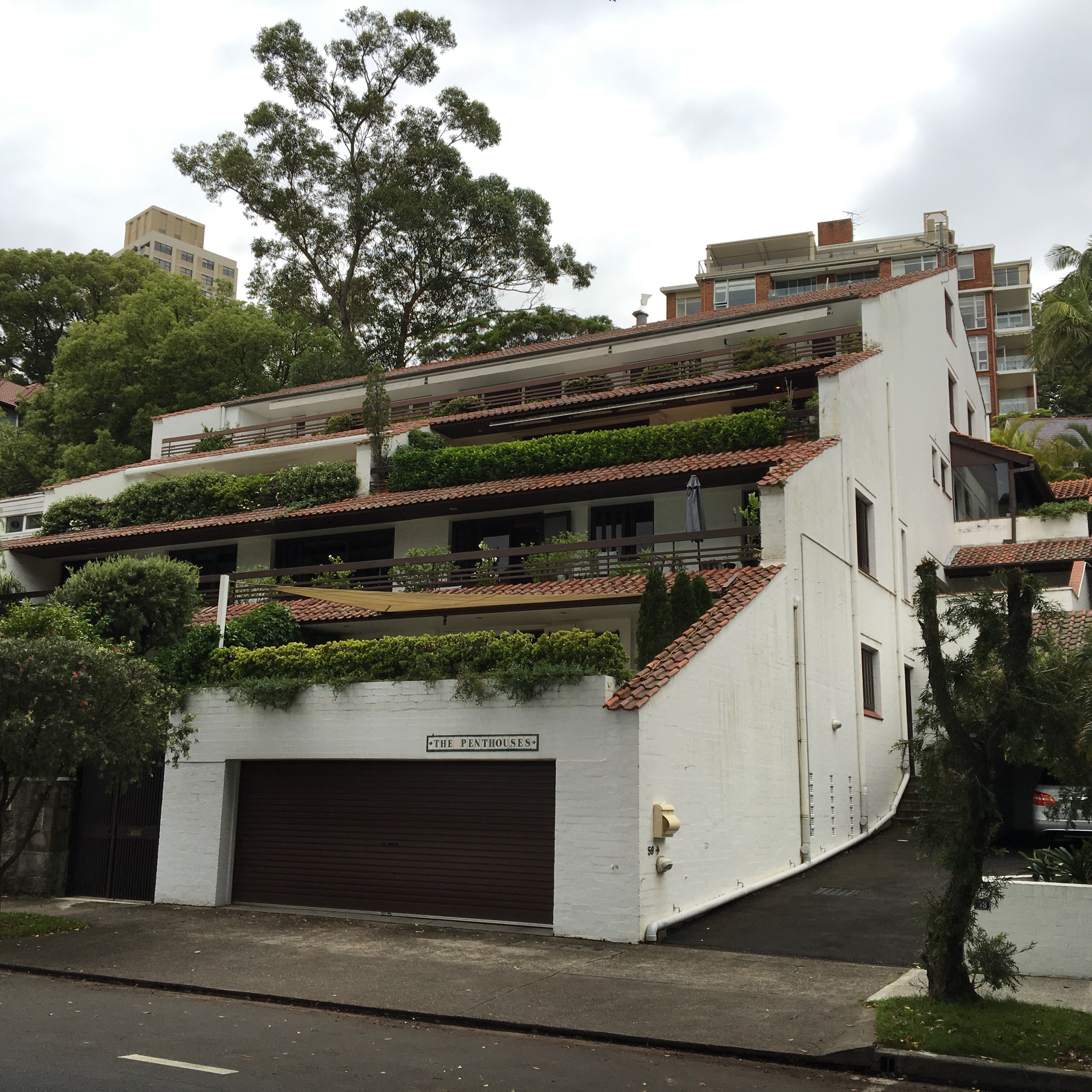
The Penthouses, Darling Point, Sydney by Ancher Mortlock Murray and Woolley, built 1967

Whilst Sydney School is often associated with new freestanding houses there are a number of other buildings considered within the approach, mostly designed and built in the 1960s. The award-winning 1963 St Andrews Presbyterian Agricultural College Boys Home and 1965 Tocal College both by Ian McKay and Philip Cox are key examples. The 1966 brick walled and raked tiled roofed of Clubbe Hall at Frensham School by Keith Cottier is also a highly regarded in the context of the Sydney School, and was awarded the 1966 Blacket Prize and the 2026 New South Wales Enduring Architecture Award 60 years later.

The St Andrew's Boys Home buildings by McKay and Cox were summarised by Archaeological and Heritage Management Solutions (AHMS) in a 2013 heritage report stating: “The former St Andrew’s Home for Boys is a significant example of the Sydney School architectural style of the mid twentieth century, which was an influential style in its era and was practised by notable Australian architects."

The 1967 Shortland Building and 1969 Staff House at the University of Newcastle both by Ancher, Mortlock, Murray and Woolley (Ken Woolley) are highly regarded in the Sydney School canon, and both received the Blacket Prize. The 1970 Rothbury Estate Winery in the Hunter Valley by Allen Jack and Cottier (Keith Cottier) is also considered to have strong Sydney School attributes and was also awarded Blacket Prize at the time.

Sydney School non-residential buildings
Year	Architect	Project	Location	Notes	Notes/AIA awards
1959	Peter Muller	Richardson Ski Lodge 'Manohara' (now Wombiana Chalet)	5 Buckwong Place, Thredbo Village, NSW	Accommodation	For Garry Richardson (son of Mervyn Victor Richardson)
1963	Bill Lucas with Marion Hall Best	Moonbah Ski Lodge (1956–1963)	14 Diggings Terrace, Thredbo	Accommodation	
1963	Ian McKay and Philip Cox Architects in Association	St Andrews Presbyterian Agricultural College Boys Home (demolished)	1050 Camden Valley Way, Leppington	Education	Sulman Medal, 1963
1964	NSW Government Architect: Ted Farmer with Peter Hall	Goldstein College & Dining Hall	University of New South Wales, Kensington Campus	Education	Sulman Medal, 1964
1965	Donald Gazzard	Wentworth Memorial Church (1963–1965)	32B Fitzwilliam Road, Vaucluse	Religion	
1965	Ian McKay and Philip Cox Architects in Association	Tocal College (CB Alexander Campus)	815 Tocal Road, Paterson	Education	Sulman Medal, 1965; Blacket Prize, 1965 (NSW); New South Wales Enduring Architecture Award, 2014; National Award for Enduring Architecture, 2014
1965	Harry Seidler & Associates	Lend Lease Company Lodge/Dusseldorp Ski Lodge (now Seidler Lodge)	8 Diggings Terrace, Thredbo	Accommodation	Wilkinson Award, 1965
1966	Allen Jack and Cottier (Keith Cottier)	Clubbe Hall, Frensham School	Waverley Parade and Range Road, Mittagong	Education	Blacket Prize, 1966 (NSW); New South Wales Enduring Architecture Award, 2026
1967	Ancher, Mortlock, Murray and Woolley (Ken Woolley)	Union Building (Shortland Building)	Shortland Lane, Callaghan, University of Newcastle	Education	Blacket Prize, 1967 (NSW)
1967	Ancher, Mortlock, Murray and Woolley (Ken Woolley) (landscape by Bruce Mackenzie)	The Penthouses	60 New Beach Road, Darling Point	Multiresidential	Wilkinson Award, 1968 (NSW)
1967	John James (landscape by Bruce Mackenzie)	Reader's Digest Building (1964—1967)	26-32 Waterloo Street, Surry Hills	Commercial	New South Wales Enduring Architecture Award, 2016; National Award for Enduring Architecture, 2016
1967	Ancher, Mortlock, Murray and Woolley (Ken Woolley)	RAIA Headquarters	2a Mugga Way, Red Hill, Canberra	Commercial	Sir Roy Grounds Award for Enduring Architecture, 2002
1969	Ancher, Mortlock, Murray and Woolley (Ken Woolley & Glenn Murcutt)	Staff House	University of Newcastle, Shortland Lane, Callaghan, Newcastle	Education	Blacket Prize, 1969 (NSW)
1970	Allen Jack and Cottier (Keith Cottier)	Rothbury Estate Winery	2213 Broke Road, Pokolbin	Commercial	Blacket Prize, 1970 (NSW)

== See also ==
- Neville Gruzman
- Bill Lucas
- Bryce Mortlock
- Peter Muller
- Bruce Rickard
- Ken Woolley
