= Balthazar Korab =

Hungarian-American photographer (1926–2013)

- Koráb Boldizsár
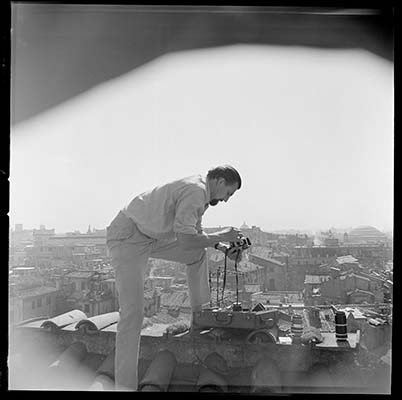
- Between 1966 and 1968 Korab worked with Astra Zarina on a photoessay project documenting Roman roofscapes.
- Born: 1926; Budapest, Hungary
- Died: January 15, 2013 (aged 86–87)
- Education: École des beaux-arts, Paris
- Known for: Architectural, art, and landscape photography
- Spouse: Monica Korab
- Children: 2 (Christian and Alexandra)
- Awards: AIA Medal for Architectural Photography (1964); AIA Lifetime Achievement Award for Photography (2007)

Balthazar Korab (Hungarian: Koráb Boldizsár; 1926 – January 15, 2013) was a Hungarian-American photographer based in Detroit, Michigan, specializing in architectural, art and landscape photography.

== Biography ==
Korab was born in Budapest, Hungary, and migrated to France after fleeing from Hungary's communist government in 1949. At the École des beaux-arts in Paris, he completed a diploma of architecture in 1954. For a time, he was a journeyman under the direction of leading European architects, including Le Corbusier.

In 1955, Korab arrived in the United States, and Eero Saarinen employed him as an architect, where his skill with a camera led to him becoming responsible for the integration of photography into the architectural design process. The architectural community in Detroit embraced Korab's career, and many firms retained him to document their building and private home projects. In 1956, he was awarded fourth place in the international design competition for the Sydney Opera House with fellow Hungarian Laszlo Peter Kollar. Korab documented the 1966 flood of the Arno in Florence, Italy.

In 1994, American President Bill Clinton presented a portfolio of Balthazar Korab's photography to Árpád Göncz, the president of Hungary. Korab died on January 15, 2013, after a long battle with Parkinson's disease. He is survived by his wife Monica and two children, Christian and Alexandra. Today, Korab's collection is held at the Library of Congress.

== Highlights of architectural photography ==
- Le Corbusier: Carpenter Center for the Visual Arts, Harvard University; Unité d'Habitation, Marseille
- Mies van der Rohe: Berlin National Gallery; Museum of Fine Arts, Houston
- Louis Isadore Kahn: Salk Institute for Biological Studies, La Jolla, CA; Kimbell Art Museum, Ft. Worth, TX
- Frank Lloyd Wright: Guggenheim Museum, New York; comprehensive coverage of all structures built between 1893 and 1959
- Eero Saarinen: TWA Terminal, JFK Airport, NY; Dulles International Airport Terminal, Washington Metropolitan Area; Gateway Arch, St. Louis; GM Technical Center, Detroit
- Harry Weese: Arena Stage, Washington D.C.; Time-Life Building, Chicago
- Minoru Yamasaki: World Trade Center - North Tower and South Tower - comprehensive coverage of model through finished building
- Frank Gehry: Own house in Santa Monica, CA; Weisman Museum, Minneapolis
- Marcel Breuer: Saint John's Abbey, Collegeville, Minnesota; UNESCO Headquarters, Paris
- Edward Larrabee Barnes: Christian Theological Seminary, Indianapolis; Walker Art Center, Minneapolis
- Philip Johnson: Transco Tower, Houston; Detroit One Center; Glass House, New Canaan, CT
- I M Pei: Dallas City Hall, National Gallery East Wing, Washington, D.C.; Rock & Roll Hall of Fame, Cleveland
- Cesar Pelli: City Hall San Bernardino, CA; Four Leaf Towers, Houston; Cleveland Clinic
- Skidmore, Owings & Merrill: US Air Force Academy, Colorado Springs; Lutheran Brotherhood, Minneapolis; Grinnell College, Iowa
- Louis Sullivan: National Farmers Bank, Owatonna, MN; Carson Pirie Scott, Chicago

== Honors and career highlights ==
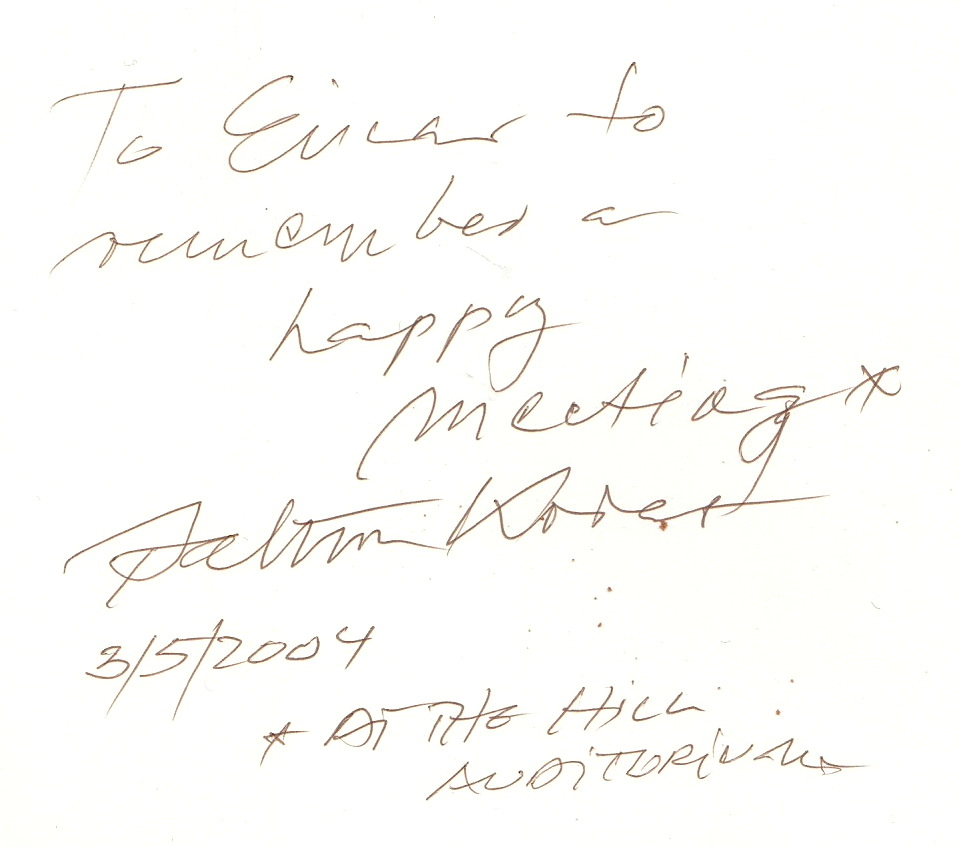
Balthazar Korab's signature

- 1957 Sydney Opera House Competition with Laszlo Peter Kollar – Fourth Place
- 1958 Invited by Frank Lloyd Wright to join Taliesin
- 1964 American Institute of Architects Medal for Architectural Photography
- 1975 Michigan Society of Architects – Honorary Member
- 1977-1982 Governor's Committee on Art in Public Places – Michigan
- 1984-1986 Design Editor – Metropolitan Detroit
- 1985 American Institute of Architects Detroit Chapter – Honorary Member
- 1986 Arts Foundation of Michigan
- 1989 Michigan Society of Landscape Architects – Honorary Member
- 1998 Cranbrook Educational Community, President's Design Advisory Committee
- 2007 American Institute of Architects Lifetime Achievement Award for Photography; Hungarian Institute of Architects, Honorary Award for Lifetime Achievement

== Bibliography ==
Books and articles featuring Korab's pictures.

- Comazzi, John, Balthazar Korab: Architect of Photography, Princetown Architectural Press, New York, 2012
- Ferry, W. Hawkins, The Buildings of Detroit; A History, Wayne State University Press, Detroit, 1968
- Hogg, Victor and Balthazar Korab, Legacy of the River Raisin: The Historic Buildings of Monroe County, Michigan, The Monroe County Historical Society, Monroe, Michigan, 1976.
- Schmitt, Peter and Balthazar Korab, Kalamazoo: Nineteenth-century Homes in a Midwestern Village, Kalamazoo City Historical Commission, Kalamazoo, Michigan, 1976
- Hendry, L Fay, Outdoor Sculpture in Grand Rapids, iota Press, Okemos, Michigan, 1980
- Hendry, L Fay, Outdoor Sculpture in Kalamazoo, iota Press, Okemos, Michigan, 1980
- Hendry, L Fay, Outdoor Sculpture in Lansing, iota Press, Okemos, Michigan, 1980
- New Deal, Government Architecture, Murals & Sculpture of the 1930s & 1940s: A Walking Tour of East Lansing & Lansing, photographs from the Balthazar Korab Collection ca. 1986
- Farbman, Suzy and James P Gallagher, The Renaissance of the Wayne County Building, Smith, Hinchman & Grylls Associates, Inc., The Old Wayne County Building Limited Partnership, Walbridge Aldinger Company, Detroit, Michigan 1989
- Eckert, Kathryn Bishop, Buildings of Michigan, Oxford University Press, New York, 1993
- Eckert, Kathryn Bishop, Cranbrook: The Campus Guide, Princeton Architectural Press, NY, 2001
- Hill, Eric J. and John Gallagher, AIA Detroit: The American Institute of Architects Guide to Detroit Architecture, Wayne State University Press, Detroit, 2003
