= Laszlo Peter Kollar =

Australian architect and academic (1926–2000)

Peter Kollar
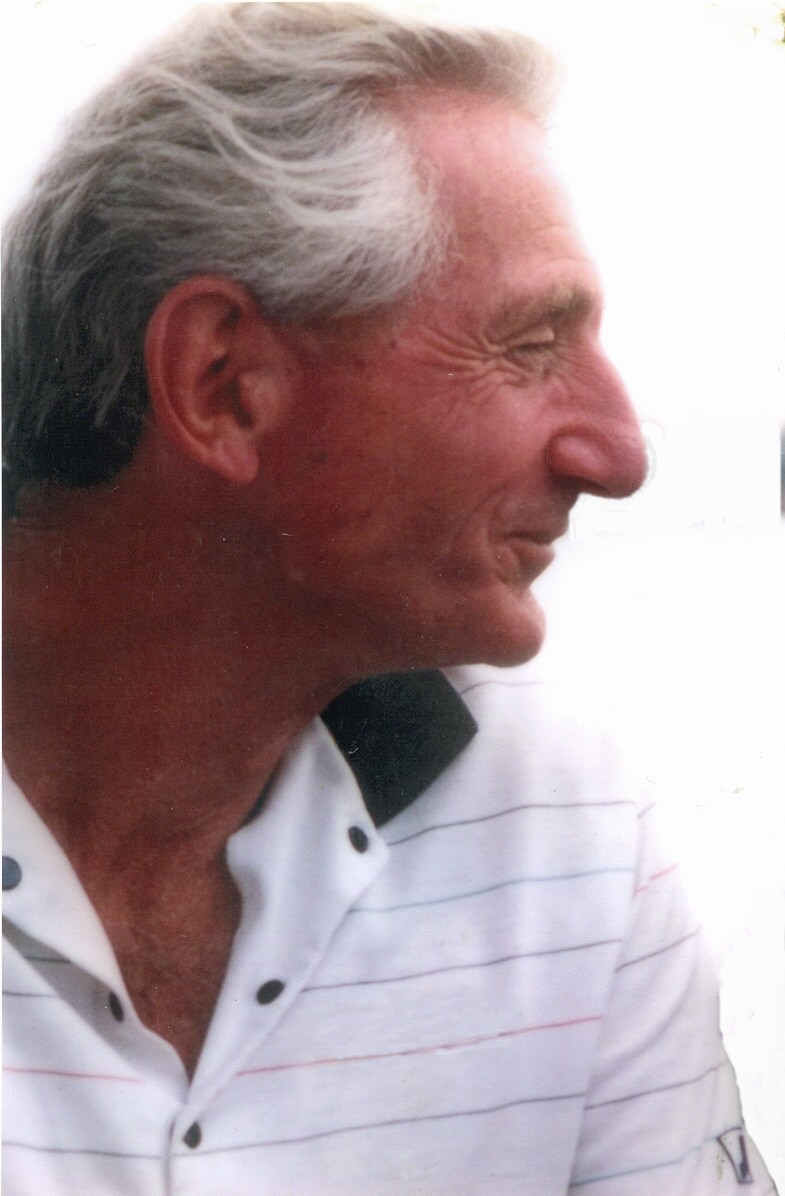
- László Peter Kollar (1926-2000)
- Born: László Peter Kollar; December 1926; Budapest, Hungary
- Died: 16 December 2000 (aged 73–74); Sydney, New South Wales, Australia
- Education: Technical University of Budapest; New South Wales University of Technology
- Occupations: Architect, academic
- Buildings: Beatty Street, Balgowlah
- Design: Sydney Opera House competition 4th place

László Peter Kollar (1926–2000) was an Australian architect and professor at the University of New South Wales, who was known for his design principles, which were influenced by the human condition and spiritual traditions.

== Personal life ==
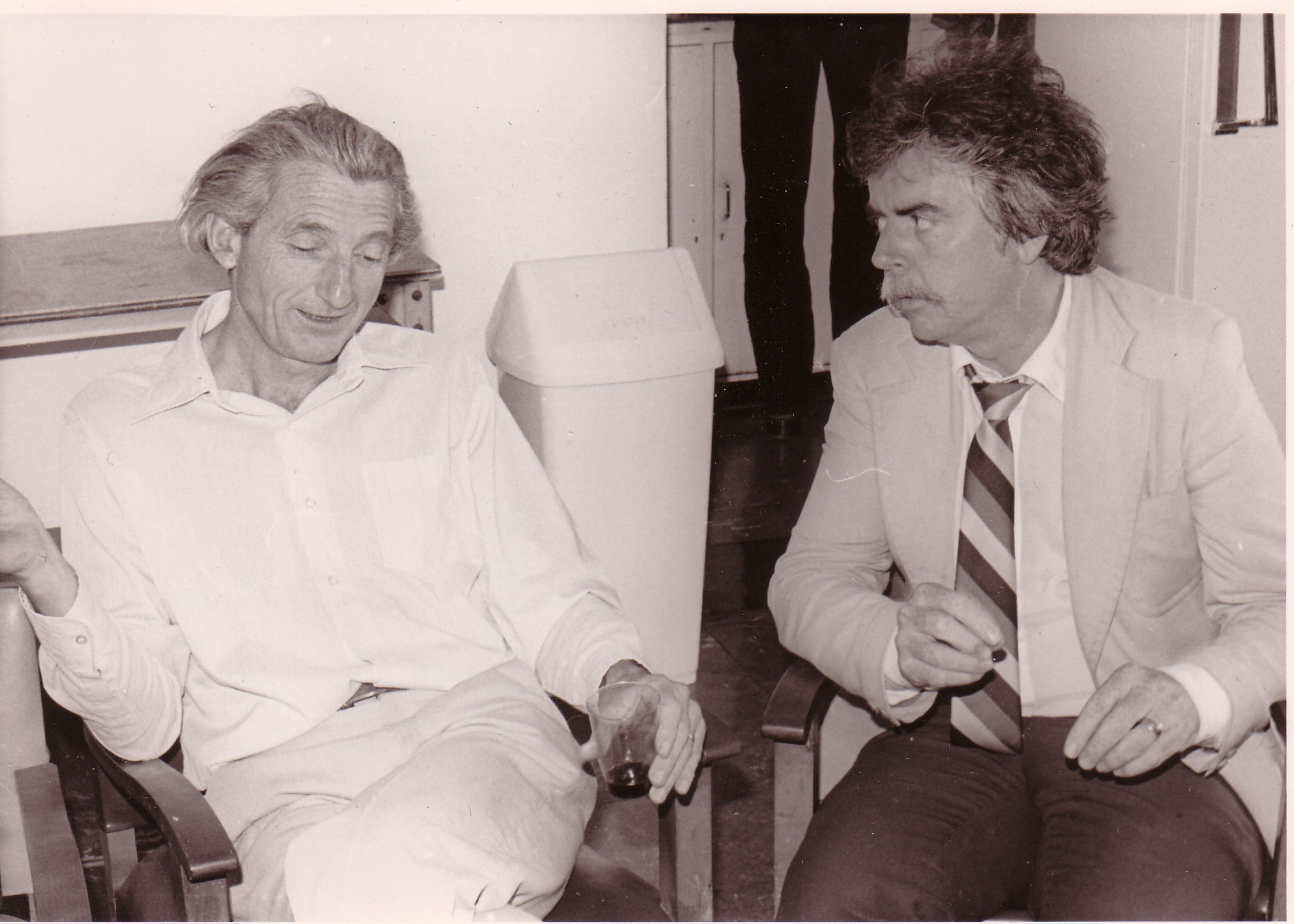
Photo taken in the staff room at UNSW in the 70's whilst Kollar was talking with Paul Walsh, one of Kollar's 'acolytes' and a very close friend

Born in Budapest, Hungary, in 1926, Peter Kollar completed his secondary schooling in Hungary in 1944. The following year he enrolled in the architecture program at the Technical University of Budapest and studied there for the next four years.

In 1949, eight months before completing his degree, Kollar fled Hungary after the communist takeover of his country. He then spent some time in Italy working for the International Refugee Organization, while also travelling to Austria and Germany. He sailed to Australia in September 1950, initially staying at Bonegilla, a migrant reception centre in Victoria, before moving to Villawood migrant reception centre in Sydney in late October 1950.

Kollar's first job in Sydney was as a labourer with the British Australian Lead Manufacturers, but in February 1951 he obtained a position of more personal interest to him – that of architectural draftsman.

Peter Kollar was studying an Associate Diploma (Architecture) part-time when the course was transferred from Sydney Technical College to the New South Wales University of Technology in 1951, thus beginning what was to become a long-term association with this university.

He graduated in 1953 and four years later, in June 1957, Kollar accepted an appointment as a lecturer in architecture. His 'Principles of Design' lectures were said to have had a profound subject matter which focused on the nature of the human condition informed by a deep understanding of great Spiritual Traditions of the world. Over the years Kollar developed a suite of courses that complemented and elaborated on these principles.

He remained a member of the university's academic community until his death. In that time he served the university as lecturer, senior lecturer, associate professor and, finally, visiting professor.

He was buried at Macquarie Park Cemetery and Crematorium, Sydney in December 2000.

== Design principles ==
Kollar asserts the primacy of intellect over circumstances; the root of beautiful architecture is in not in material reality but in enlightenment philosophy. Much of Kollar's written work is concerned with the duality of Function and Beauty; he argues that there is, hypothetically, an equation wherein Function equals Truth and Truth equals Beauty. He references architectural history only in the spiritual context:

Beyond the physical and human plane there is a vast realm that contains man’s deeply rooted desire to reach higher than himself… When architectural thought is focussed upon this plane, it unveils some aspect or part of the perennial Truth, recognisable beyond its own time and context with Universal validity. This is the hallmark of architectural masterpieces that thus become endowed with everlasting significance.

— L. Peter Kollar, 1958.

Central to Kollar's philosophy is the notion that architecture has a responsibility to facilitate human delight and spiritual awareness.

Delightful architecture is a reminder of the wonders of the world, of the joys of life... the wonder of life is not added to but is found within life itself; if it be veiled by our insensibility, by our ignorance or superficiality, one would need to draw 'away' or 'part' the veil, to reveal, to discover what is ever there. Delightful architecture is not concerned with shape, style, colour, materials, simplicity, clarity, fit, order, or whatever else, in the first place its chief concern is only one, to reveal the wondrous texture of life in our magical world so that we may discover, through knowledge, sensitivity and insight, the invisible significance beyond the visible signs.

— L. Peter Kollar, 1985.

In his book Patterns of Delightful Architecture Kollar asserts that this universal delight is only achievable through harmony, lucidity, analogy, ordered geometry and rhythm, a carefully considered relationship between the whole and its many parts, and sensitivity to the various phases or events in the human condition.

== Selected published works ==
- On Post-modern Architecture
- On the Whole and the Part
- Patterns of Delightful Architecture
- Symbolism in Hindu Architecture as revealed in the Shri Minakshi Sundareswar (photographs by Alan Croker)

== Notable projects ==
=== Sydney Opera House competition ===
Kollar's most notable work was the concept design of the Sydney Opera House competition in 1956 (scheme 63), in collaboration with associate and fellow Hungarian Balthazar Korab, who had previously worked as a photographer for Eero Saarinen. They placed fourth in the competition which resulted in the winning design by Jørn Utzon. Kollar's design was ranked the highest out of all Australian entries and was met with high appraisal by judges for its 'skilful planning'. However, Kollar continually championed Utzon's design, even when Utzon omitted himself from the project, recognizing that the Sydney Opera House Utzon had designed was seen as important in a newly liberated design language. The Opera House design Kollar created are some of the highlights in Kollar's papers, which were deposited at UNSW Archives.

Editor of "Building a masterpiece: The Sydney Opera House" Anne Watson commented on the competition entries including that of Kollar's stating:

Much has been made of the imaginative and daring choice of the four competition judges in January 1957. However, other entries by architects like Harry Seidler, Peter Kollar, and Robert Geddes, commended by the competition judges, provide fascinating insights into the wide range of modernist design responses to the site and the competition brief.

— Anne Watson.

=== Balgowlah House ===
In 1961 a harbour fronting house designed by Kollar located in Beatty Street, Balgowlah was selected for an exhibition on contemporary residential architecture, called 15 Houses by Sydney Architects organised by the NSW Chapter of the Royal Australian Institute of Architects and the Museum of Modern Art, Melbourne. This house with white washed walls and natural timber interiors was considered to be in alignment with the approach of the Sydney School.

== L. Peter Kollar Memorial Prize ==
The University of New South Wales Faculty of the Built Environment annually awards a student with the L. Peter Kollar Memorial Prize for "excellent scholarship making a significant contribution to the promotion of human dignity and social and environmental responsibility with respect for the whole human person in a whole world – the tripartite human nature comprising spirit, mind and body in a world with its corresponding spiritual, subtle and physical dimensions."
