= Bryce Mortlock =

Australian architect (1921–2004)

Bryce Mortlock AM
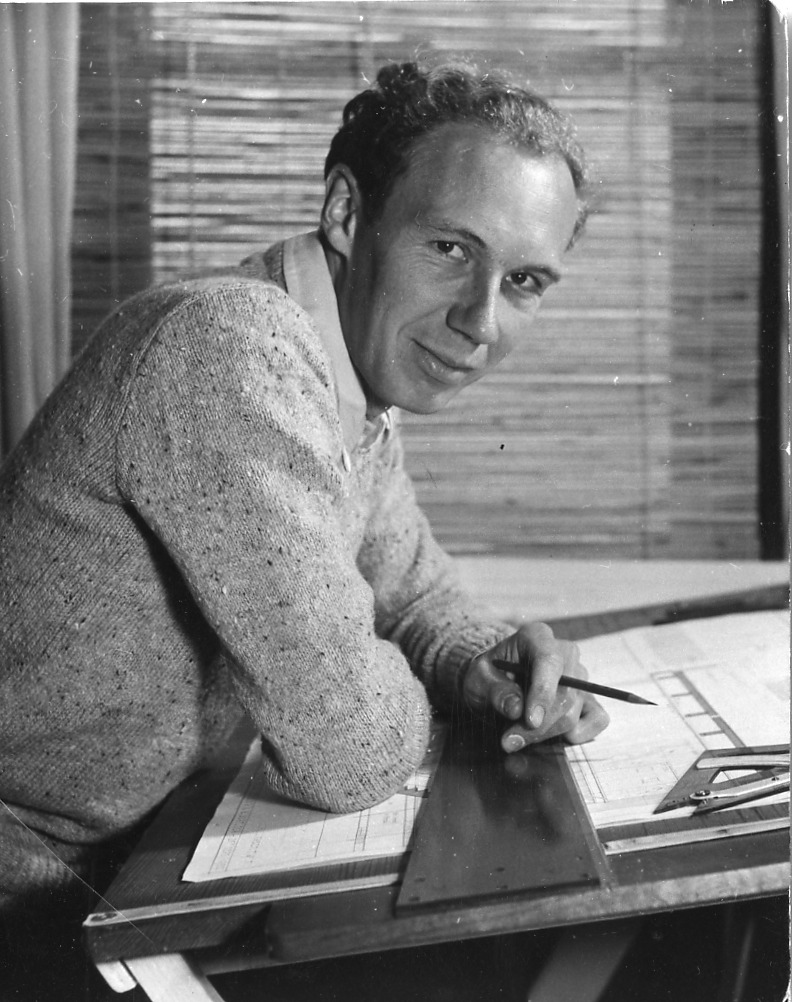
- Mortlock at his desk, 1950s
- Born: Harold Bryce Mortlock; 14 October 1921; Lithgow, Australia
- Died: 3 July 2004 (aged 82); Sydney, New South Wales, Australia
- Education: University of Sydney
- Occupation: Architect
- Height: 6 ft 1 in (185 cm)
- Spouse: Peggy Mortlock (died January 2008)
- Awards: Sulman Medal, 1960; RAIA Gold Medal, 1979; Life Fellow RAIA, 1970; Associate RIBA
- Practice: Ancher Mortlock Murray (1952—1964); Ancher Mortlock Murray and Woolley (1964—1975); Ancher Mortlock and Woolley (1975—2013)
- Buildings: Badham House

Harold Bryce Mortlock AM (14 October 1921 – 3 July 2004) was an Australian architect and planner, alongside Sydney Ancher, Stuart Murray and Ken Woolley. His career spanned the era which saw the consolidation of modernist architecture in Australia.

His two best known projects include the Sulman Award-winning Badham House in Sydney's Cronulla and the Engineering Precinct at The University of Sydney. He was also responsible for the design of the master plan of The University of Melbourne.

== Early life ==
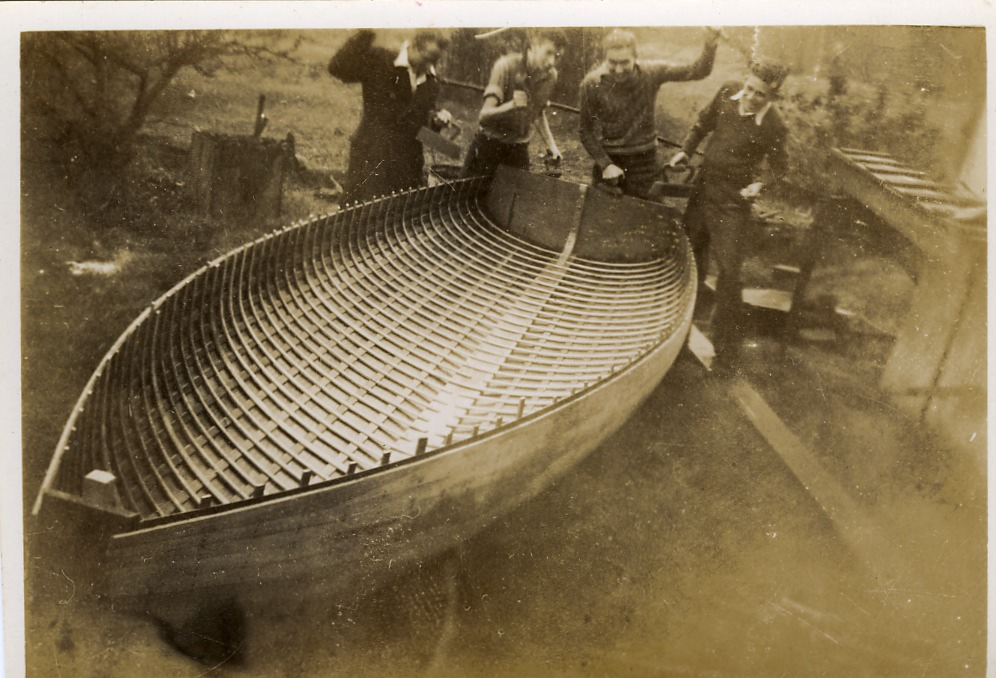
Bryce (2nd from right) and Alan Payne (3rd from right) building the 12-foot skiff, Thunder.

Mortlock was born in Lithgow on 14 October 1921. His father was an engineer at the local steel works, and died when Mortlock was still young. His mother moved the family to live with relatives in Sydney, in the suburb of Five Dock. Watching the local boat builders there fostered Mortlock's interest in design and construction. He built several boats while still at school.

=== World War II ===
During World War II, Mortlock traveled to Canada to train as a pilot with the Royal Canadian Air Force. He returned to Australia in 1945 in anticipation of service in the Pacific theater, but the war ended before he could be posted for combat.

=== University ===
After leaving the air force he enrolled in the School of Architecture at the University of Sydney. There he studied under architect Leslie Wilkinson and the artist Lloyd Rees, who taught architectural history and freehand drawing. During his studies Bryce met Sydney Ancher – one of the first Australian architects to embrace International style Modernism. He started working with Ancher while still a student. Their partnership would span four decades, until Ancher's death in 1979.

Mortlock graduated from the School of Architecture at University of Sydney with first class honours in 1950, winning the University Medal and the George McRae award for construction. He also won a £400 Byera Hadley travelling scholarship in 1951. This allowed him to work and study in Britain and Europe.

== Career ==
=== Ancher Mortlock Murray ===
Upon his return to Australia Mortlock and Stuart Murray took up full-time work with architect Sydney Ancher's firm in 1952. Eight years later he won the 1960 Sulman Medal for the Badham House at Cronulla.

=== Ancher Mortlock and Woolley ===
After Ken Woolley joined them in 1964, Ancher and Mortlock set up offices in Ridge Street, North Sydney, establishing the well-known Sydney firm Ancher, Mortlock and Woolley. The firm completed innovative designs for town houses and flats at Wollstonecraft and Cremorne. They were also appointed Master Planner for the University of Melbourne in 1968. It was a position that entailed regular trips from his Cammeray home, but one which he held until the late 1990s, describing it as his most satisfying and challenging. The University of Melbourne recognised his work with an honorary doctorate. In 1970 Mortlock, in partnership with others, applied his interest in planning and the need for increasing density to the drafting of a Building Code for North Sydney Council.

=== Environmental work ===
Mortlock had been living in the Middle Harbour area for over 40 years and moved to Vernon Street, Cammeray, with his new wife Peggy in 1950, shortly after returning from overseas. As two of the first residents of that area, the Mortlocks confronted the North Sydney Council who had begun clearing the bush land fronting Long Bay in Middle Harbour. The Mortlocks convinced Council to stop the foreshore destruction and over the next four decades cared for the public land near their home – cutting the lantana and balloon vine that grew in the wake of the clearing. Eventually the Council embraced Mortlock's attitude to the preservation of the endemic bushland. Bushcare Group networks were set up and Bryce himself became a local volunteer coordinator.

=== Professional activity ===
The Royal Australian Institute of Architects National President Warren Kerr described Bryce Mortlock: "Bryce Mortlock was well-known for his energetic support of the architectural profession and the RAIA, and for his willingness to speak out on matters of importance, especially as they affected good design," Mr Kerr said. "The contributions he made as the RAIA’s NSW Chapter President from 1970–1972 and RAIA National President from 1975–1976 will long be remembered". "He was also widely known as a talented architect of the highest order, who justly received awards for his work on more than one continent."

== Awards ==
Mortlock was awarded the Alfred Bossom Medal in London (1951); New South Wales's prestigious Sir John Sulman Medal (1960) and Merit Award (1972); the RAIA’s top annual award, the RAIA Gold Medal (1979); the Queen's Jubilee Medal (1977); the RAIA Victorian Chapter Bronze Medal (1981); an Honorary Doctorate from the University of Melbourne (1988); and was appointed as a Member of the Order of Australia (1982) for services to architecture. He was appointed a Life Fellow of the RAIA in 1970.

== Later years ==
Although he enjoyed a national reputation, Mortlock's passion for sensitive environmental relationships in urban design and practice was also recognised by his local community. He was a pioneer of what would become known as the Bushcare movement. In 1997 his efforts to preserve and regenerate bushland near his Cammeray home were commemorated with the renaming of the Vernon Street Reserve, ‘Mortlock Reserve’.

Mortlock died on 3 July 2004 at the Royal North Shore Hospital, aged 82 years.

Professional and academic associations
Preceded by Richard Norman (Peter) Johnson	President of the Royal Australian Institute of Architects (NSW Chapter); 1970–1972	Succeeded by Geoffrey Lumsdaine
Awards
Preceded by Grounds, Romberg & Boyd	Recipient of the Sir John Sulman Medal; 1960	Succeeded by Bunning & Madden
