= Michael Dysart =

Australian architect (1934–2026)

Michael Dysart AM
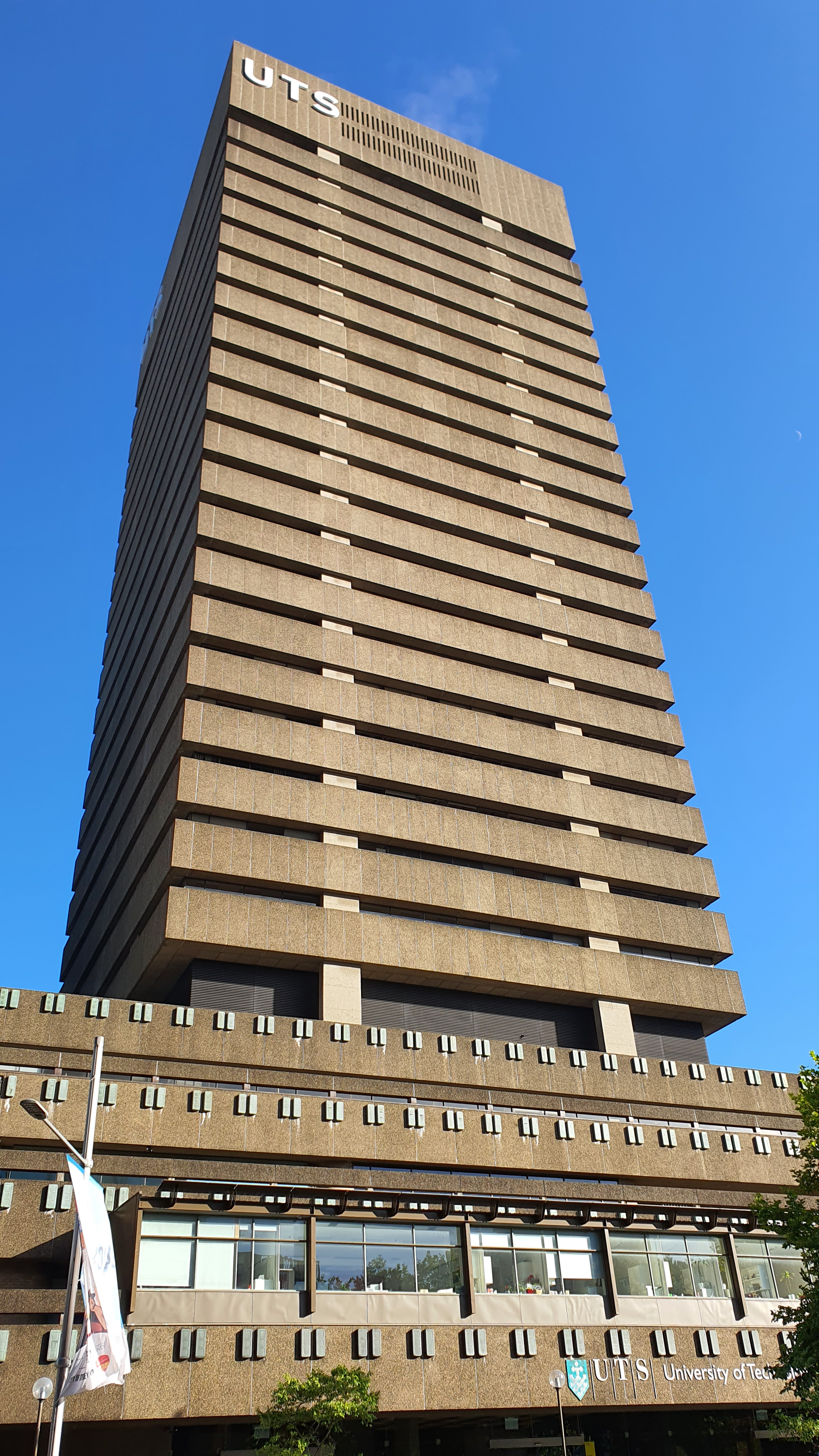
- UTS Tower 1
- Born: 18 April 1934; Brighton, England
- Died: 27 May 2026 (aged 92)
- Citizenship: Australia
- Education: University of Sydney
- Occupation: Architect
- Years active: 1958—2009
- Known for: Sydney School
- Spouse: Dinah Dysart
- Children: Matthew, Rebecca
- Awards: Blacket Prize 1964, Sir Roy Grounds Award for Enduring Architecture 2002 & 2019
- Practice: NSW Government Architect, Michael Dysart & Partners, Davis Heather & Dysart
- Buildings: UTS Tower 1, Robb College, Polish War Memorial Chapel, Taree Technical College, Regent Hotel
- Projects: Urambi Village Housing Cooperative, Wybalena Grove ACT
- Design: Pettit & Sevitt houses, other project houses including Habitat houses, over 40 high schools, cooperative housing, social housing, hotels, public works, churches, university buildings.

Michael John Dysart AM (18 April 1934 – 27 May 2026) was an Australian architect best known for his contribution to significant landmarks, schools and colleges, churches, project housing and co-operative housing developments during a career spanning over 50 years. He is regarded a prominent figure in the Sydney School movement and in Australian vernacular architecture.

== Early life ==
Michael Dysart was born in Brighton, England on 18 April 1934, and was of Irish and English–French heritage. After the Second World War, he attended an experimental school in Brighton which required traditional academic classes for four days, followed by a fifth day undertaking a trade including bricklaying. The family emigrated to Sydney when he was a teenager, after he had seen the 1948 test cricket match between Australia and England, in which the English team were beaten by 'bronze gods' who had him in awe. They settled in Katoomba, where his father built schools as a skilled tradesman and carpenter.

== Education and early career ==
In 1955 he won a NSW Government Architect traineeship and attended the University of Sydney. Upon graduation in 1958, he was youngest of four trainees to join Harry Rembert's Design Room. The other members were Peter Webber, Ken Woolley and Peter Hall.

In 1958, he entered the Australian Family Home competition with Ken Woolley, to design a low-cost home for the average Australian family. They won the competition and £2,000 prize money ($78,600 in 2025) for the design of a square villa with central courtyard. The competition resulted in national prominence in newspapers, magazines and television.

== Personal life ==
In 1963, he married Dinah Dysart who became a curator, art advisor, writer and editor of Art and Australia. They had two children, Matthew and Rebecca.

== Project and co-operative housing ==
The 1958 competition led to early work in residential architecture through the emerging project housing industry. In 1960, Dysart and Woolley were approached to take part in the Parade of Homes exhibition where their square villa would be built for the first time. In 1961, Dysart and Woolley began discussions with Pettit & Sevitt, a merchant builder wishing to offer architect-designed houses to the new middle classes and for which he and Woolley designed their first two models: the Lowline and the Split Level house.

In 1962, Dysart and Woolley were invited to be part of the Carlingford Homes Fair where they contributed three houses alongside notable architects that included Harry Seidler and Neville Gruzman.

In 1963 Dysart was accepted to both Harvard and Yale Universities for further study and planned to travel, departing the Pettit & Sevitt collaboration. He did not end up taking the placements due to the opportunities in the NSW Government Architects Branch, but travelled in 1976.

By 1964, Dysart was approached to develop project homes for Project Building Industries, and 1966 he was asked to be the sole consulting architect for another project builder, Habitat Pty Ltd. His involvement in project housing continued for 20 years. In the 1970s, Dysart had two Canberra co-operative housing projects: Urambi Village Housing Cooperative in Kambah, and Wybalena Grove, both considered significant examples of the Sydney School regional style of the late twentieth century.

== NSW Government Architects Branch ==
Dysart joined the Windham Schools Building program in 1964 to address the shortage of high schools across the state of New South Wales. He devised the 'doughnut' design solution with a series of pavilions organised around central courtyards. This also became part of the 'open schools' movement for campus design. Dysart was the design architect for 43 schools within three years.

Among the projects for which Dysart was the design architect are: Belmont Primary School, Malvina (Ryde) High School, Pendle Hill High School, Turramurra High School, Stewart House and Barrenjoey High School. In addition, he designed tertiary buildings Taree Technical College and Robb College at the University of New England. Robb College was added to the National Trust Register in July, 2012. In 2014, it was threatened with demolition.The NSW Heritage Council and NSW Institute of Architects recommended the listing of Robb College on the State Heritage Register. A petition was started in support of its protection, however the listing was denied. Plans to refurbish or redevelop the site have continued to attract scrutiny. The majority of the college was demolished in 2018, retaining only the original Dining Hall.

== Other major projects ==
While at the NSW Government Architect's Branch, Dysart was the architect for the University of Technology Sydney's main tower building which he began drawing in 1968. The building has attracted controversy in more recent years for its brutalist architecture and concrete finish as well as its dominant presence in Sydney's skyline. The 128 metre tower was originally supposed to be a set of buildings on a raised podium, but was not fully realised due to compromises on budget. Dysart originally specified the finish to be an aggregate to coat the building from a quarry that was similar in colour to the washed Sydney sandstone of NSW Parliament House. However, a darker colour was used and other compromises were made due to budget. Internally, it was detailed in timber, brass, glass and raw concrete.

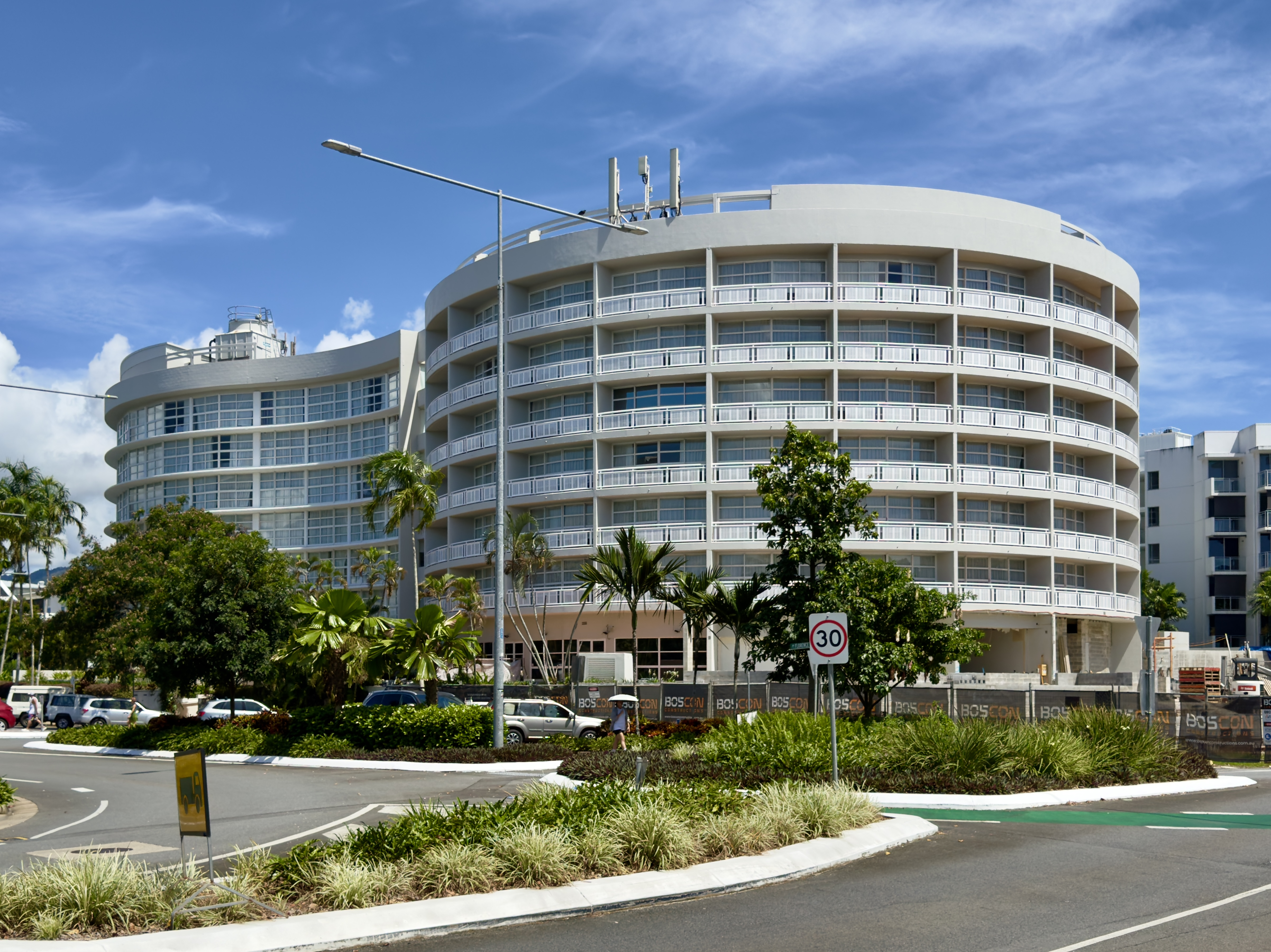
Hilton Hotel, Cairns, 1987

After leaving the NSW Government's Branch he entered private practice. He formed Michael Dysart & Partners in 1970 and was joined by architect Peter Bell working on hotels, resorts and commercial buildings including the Polish War Memorial Church in Marayong and Sir Stanford Hotel addition Macquarie Street, Sydney. The firm merged with the Queensland-based Davis Heather Group, creating Davis Heather & Dysart, and they designed the brutalist Regent Hotel in Sydney (now the Four Seasons) and the Hilton Hotel in Cairns. The firm later returned to being known as Michael Dysart & Partners and had a total staff of 35.'

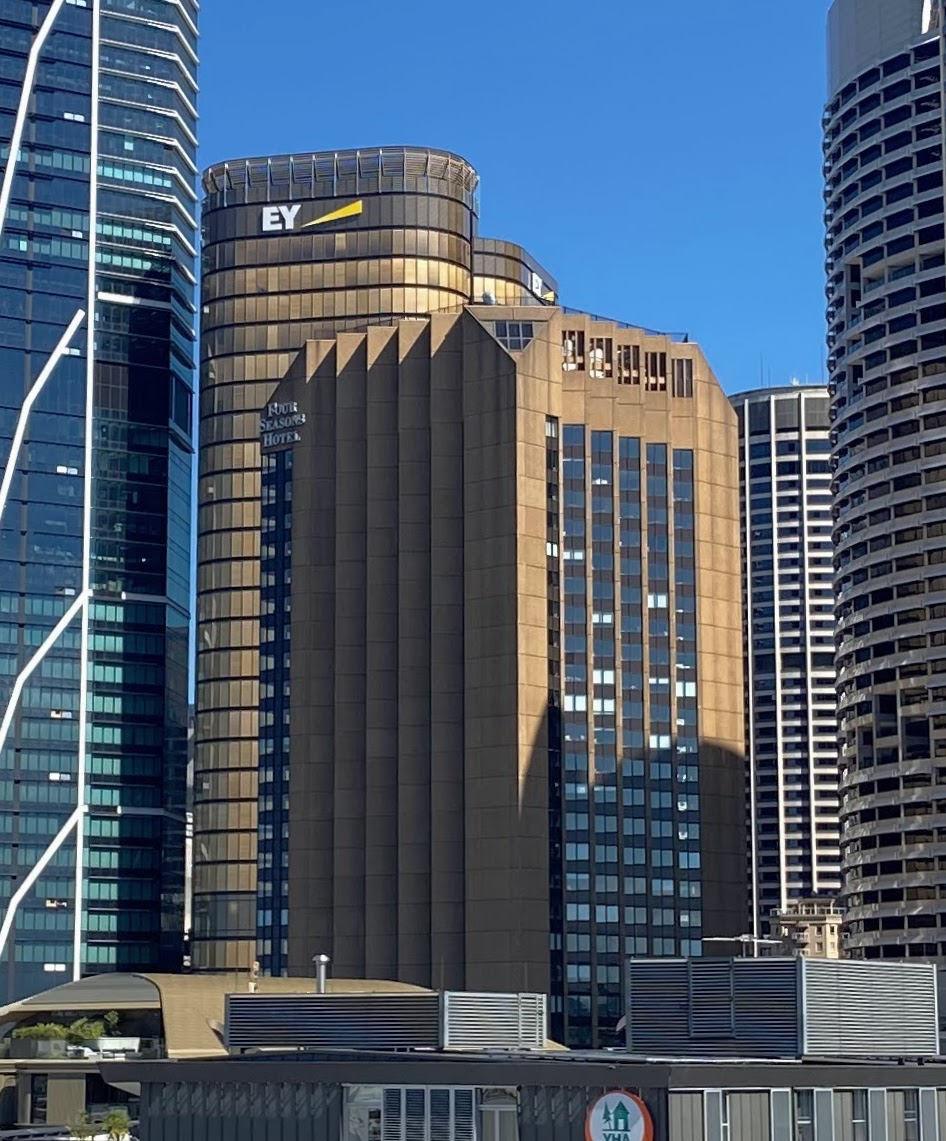
Regent Hotel, Sydney, completed 1982 (now Four Seasons Hotel)

== Architecture awards and recognition ==
Dysart was the recipient of the 1964 RAIA NSW Blacket Award for the Taree Technical College, and Highly Commended in the 1967 Sulman Award for Ryde High School, work that he undertook as part of the NSW Government Architect's branch. In 1968 Dysart was awarded the RAIA Project House Design Award for a $10,000–$13,000 house designed for Habitat project builders. In 1977, he was awarded the CS Daley Medal for Urambi Village Cooperative Housing, and in 2002 the RAIA 25 Year Award again for Urambi. In 2019, he was awarded the AIA ACT Chapter Sir Roy Grounds Award for Enduring Architecture for Wybalena Grove.

In the 2013 Australia Day Honours, Dysart was appointed a Member of the Order of Australia (AM) for significant service to architecture.

== Death ==
Dysart died on 27 May 2026, at the age of 92 in Sydney, Australia.
