= Neville Gruzman =

Australian architect (1925–2005)

Neville Gruzman AM
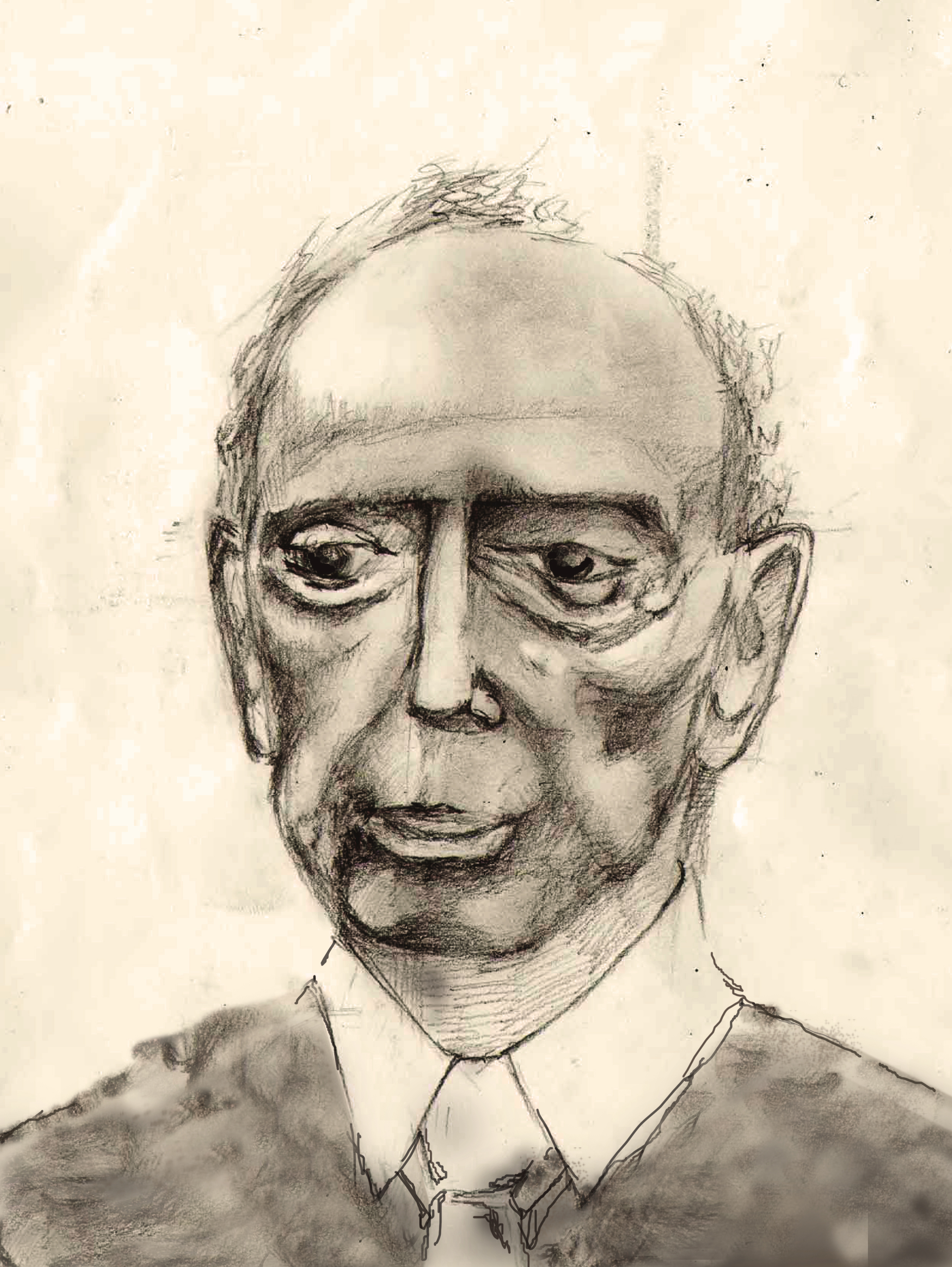
- Neville Gruzman, Architect
- Born: Neville Bruce Gruzman; 14 November 1925; Sydney, Australia
- Died: 1 May 2015 (aged 89); Sydney, Australia
- Education: University of Sydney
- Occupations: Architect, Academic, Mayor of Woollahra
- Years active: 1949—1985
- Known for: Sydney School
- Buildings: Hills House & Gruzman House

Neville Gruzman, AM (14 November 1925—1 May 2005) was an Australian architect, mayor of Woollahra, writer and architectural activist. He is considered to have exerted a decisive influence on Sydney's architecture, mostly through his dedication to designing architecture that reacts to the landscape and to the needs of the client.

== Life ==
Gruzman was born in Sydney, Australia. His parents—Sam Gruzman and Rosalind Gunzburg—were of Russian origin. He was the middle son, with Laurence, the eldest and Des, the youngest. His childhood near Cooper Park, Bellevue Hill, exerted a certain influence on him regarding his attitude towards landscape. He initially intended to fulfill his mother's wish to study medicine but enrolled for architecture after graduating from Sydney Boys High School. His brother Laurence studied Law and became a barrister and later Queen's Counsel in 1966.

In the late 1940s Neville entered the University of Sydney, where Beaux Arts was a main subject. The first three years of his studyings were difficult for him as he wasn't good in drawing. However, he profited from his work experiences. He developed an interest in ballrooms, particularly mirrors and reflections, and won some skills with glamorous decoration from an interior decorator, Margaret Jaye. In his fourth year at university, he was attracted to the European Modernists, who influenced and furthered him. Before he graduated, he designed the Lapin House, Rose Bay for his aunt. He graduated from the School of Architecture in 1952 and traveled to Europe with other graduates. Returning to Australia, he opened an office with Bill and Ruth Lucas. He read the work Architectural Beauty in Japan. He later travelled to Japan on a four-and-a-half month study visit — a journey that would be followed by numerous others to the country. Later, Gruzman was amazed by the work of Frank Lloyd Wright. His understanding of the aspects of planning and of the necessities of an ongoing development grew decisively, in this period. His interests in creative arts extended to craft and in 1964 he founded the Craft Association, Australia's first such entity, later renamed the Crafts Council of NSW and then Object: Australian Design Centre. In about 1967, he devoted himself to teaching; he is reported to have reassured his students attended the classes, regularly, and to have renounced holidays to provide extra tutorials for his students. He also participated in politics, to improve the quality of built environment.

Gruzman had poor health. He suffered from asthma and heart attacks but managed to recover. He also had an accident that led to brain surgery causing the loss of most of his memory, including for details such as door dimensions, which he most attentively relearned.

== Architecture ==
Gruzman mostly built residential houses in Sydney. His works are varied forms of Modernism known as Organic Modernism, or Regionalism; some show a strong influence by the works of Frank Lloyd Wright. The impressions exerted on him on his trips to Japan—mainly by the traditional post and beam architecture he saw at places like Katsura Imperial Villa—influenced some of the homes he created and into which he eventually included Japanese elements (Goodman House, Middle Cove). In the 1960s Gruzman gained recognition for private homes built for wealthy and sometimes eccentric clients along Sydney's north shore, such as the Hill's House (1966), designed for a nudist and the "theatrical" Holland House (1962), built for an actress, who would both delight and scare her guests by dancing on the house's handrail-less balcony hanging over a cliff face. His work has been described as "major gestures, very Hollywood glamour."

Gruzman's architectural principles included maximum exposure to sunlight and privacy visually and audibly.

Gruzman is loosely connected to the Sydney School of architects of the 1950s and 1960s—a movement that started in opposition to the International Style of modernism supported by other Australian architects and that has recently been re-discovered by home buyers and architectural fans, leading to a trend to preserve the homes from the period. However, Gruzman's work deviates from the Sydney School style in important traits; Gruzman himself denied a connection to the movement.

== Notable projects ==
Montrose Apartments — Neutral Bay, New South Wales (1954–1955)

Located at 445 Alfred Street, Neutral Bay, this lightweight glass and steel block of eight double-storey apartments was designed by Gruzman in his first year of practice. The building was highly innovative in its planning and visual impact in the landscape. It is a very early example of modernist residential curtain wall construction in Australia.

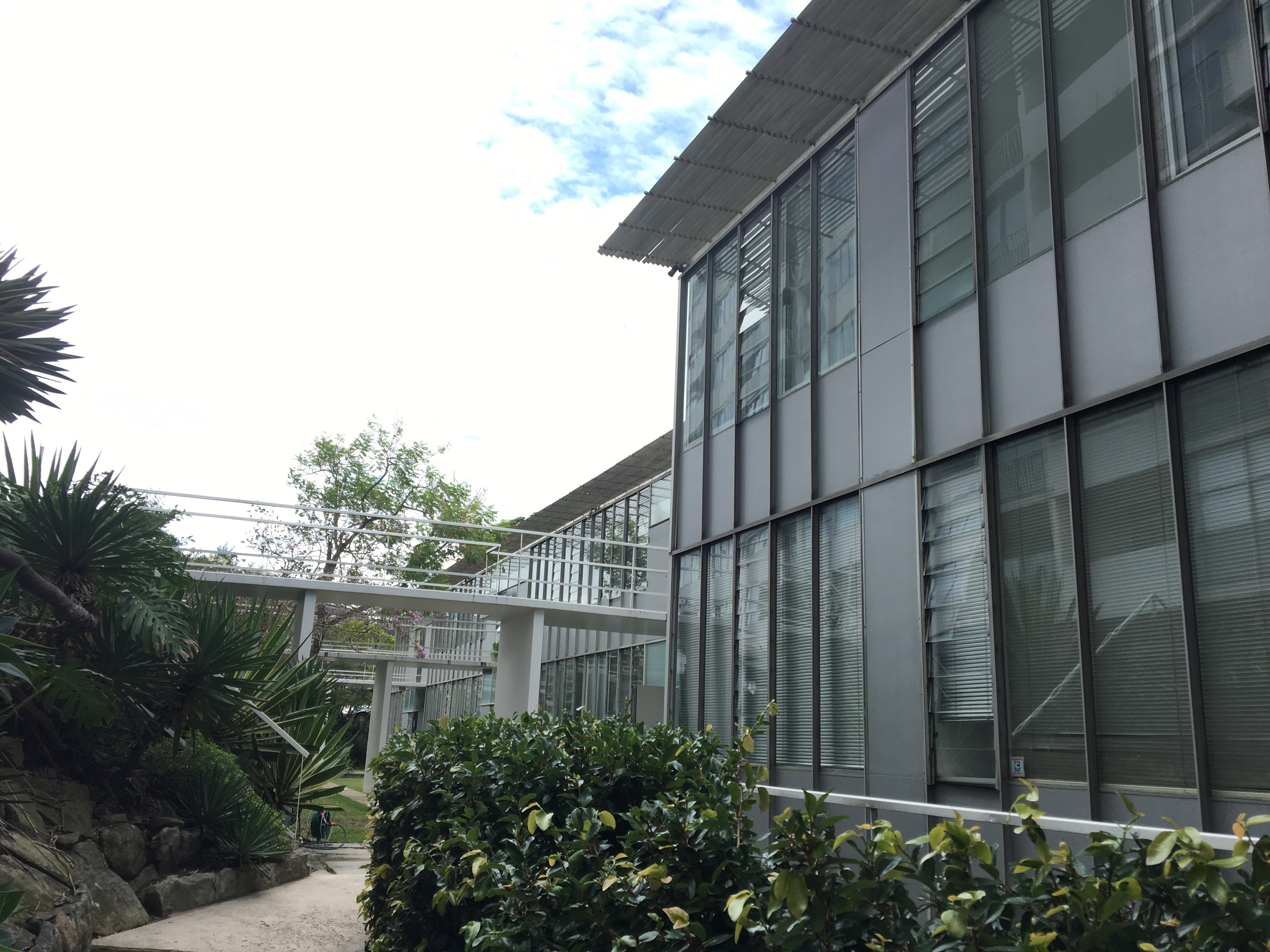
Montrose Apartments (1954–55), Neutral Bay in March 2018

Hills House — Turramurra, New South Wales (1966, 1983)

Original client was Sam Rosenburg, a nudist and vegetarian. Gruzman's idea was to build a series of hills that surround the site on three sides making it visually and acoustically private. Later, expansion was added for new clients, a family with three children. The building is referred to by Philip Goad as a product of two iconic 20th-century houses (Wright's Fallingwater and Mies van der Rohe's Farnsworth House) that created the ultimate diagram of abstract shelter in the landscape.

Gruzman House (1958–65), Darling Point

Gruzman House — Darling Point, New South Wales (1958, 1965, 1995)

Gruzman's own house built for his family is a hidden sanctuary, entirely private and distant from noise, is located at 4 Oswald Street not far from the busy New South Head Road. The living area was joyous, with its classical organic interior embellished with a collection of paintings, sculpture, and porcelain. Jørn Utzon judged that the house possessed the best living room in Australia. Another focus point is Gruzman's wife's dressing room with infinite light reflections from the mirrors on the walls on all four sides and on the ceiling. The house was extended in 1963 and again in the early 1990s.

Goodman House — Middle Cove, New South Wales (1956–57, 1983)

Designed for a couple soon after Gruzman's Japan trip, ideas of traditional Japanese architecture are infused in the design. Such as the entry to the pagoda-like end of the house and a sweeping curved roof suspended by cables. It is one of the early houses in Sydney to use materials such as dark stained timbers and natural brick.The house is located at The Quarterdeck, 17 North Arm Road.

Gaden House (Mixed Use Office Building) — Double Bay, New South Wales (1968–71)

A modernist three storey commercial building with a lower ground level located at the corner of Bay Street and Cooper Street, Double Bay (2a Cooper Street). It was designed in 1968, development application lodged on 18 March 1969 and later opened by NSW Premier Robert Askin on 25 November 1971. The building was designed for solicitors, Gaden, Bowen and Stewart, who occupied the first floor, and office space for lease on the second floor, eight shops on the ground floor and a large restaurant in the lower ground floor called D'Arcys. In a 2018 heritage assessment Anne Warr described how the project "... challenged the status quo of suburban shopping centres and transformed what could have been an ordinary suburban office and retail building into a work of art, pushing the design boundaries to produce a building that was a sculpture, both as an object in the streetscape at night as well as during the day, and in the interiors as a delightful and environmentally comfortable place to work." In 2018 a development application was made for major changes to the building. A petition from local architects and the community was established to raise the plight of the building. The application was rejected by Woollahra Council. In 2020 the building was sold, and a new development application prepared that preserved the original Gruzman design. The new development application was prepared by architects Lawton Hurley and approved in 2022.

Gowing House — Castlecrag, New South Wales (1969)

An application for a house at 8A The Bulwark for J. Gowing was prepared by Gruzman Architects, Town Planners and Landscape Architects, with Wargon Chapman and Associates Engineers in February 1970. Plans for a two-storey house were amended to a single storey after Gowing suffered a stroke in 1973. The Heritage Study for Willougby City Council describes the dwelling's value and heritage listing "Comparison of the Gowing House with other Gruzman houses highlights the individuality of the design solution for each project, key aspects of Gruzman’s work are evident in this house notably the responsiveness to the site, a carefully considered spatial flow with thought to privacy and light, exquisite detailing, and a touch of ‘Hollywood glamour’".

== Other projects ==
- Lapin House, Rose Bay (1949–52)
- Purnell Motors Pty Ltd, Arncliffe (1955)
- Riedl House, Bellevue Hill (1955–1956)
- South Head Synagogue, Rose Bay (1957)
- Benjamin House, Longueville (1959)
- Drumalbyn Road, Bellevue Hill (1960s?)
- Salz House, Mosman (1960)
- Fogl Medical Centre, Gladesville (1961)
- Holland House, 31 Rembrandt Drive, Middle Cove (1961)
- Les Girls, Kings Cross (1961)
- Wewak Council Chambers, Wewak, Papua New Guinea (1961)
- Astor Glass Factory, Surry Hills (1962)
- Lendlease Houses, Carlingford (1961–62)
- Long House, Dolls Point (1962–1964)
- Rudy Komon Art Gallery, Paddington (1963–64)
- Probert House, St Ives (1957–58, 1966)
- Illaroo Public School, Nowra (1967)
- Murwillumbah High School, Murwillumbah (1968)
- Wagga Agricultural Residential College, Wagga Wagga (1970)
- Gregory & Carr Funeral Chapel, 1747 Pittwater Road, Mona Vale (1968)
- Wentworth Bowling Green, Double Bay (1969)
- RG Menzies Building, Double Bay (1969)
- Gruzman Office, Woollahra (1969)
- Healey House, Hunters Hill (1972)
- Kingswood Public School, Kingswood (1974)
- McHollick House, Paddington (1974)
- Chadwick House, Forestville (1961–64, 1968, 1976)
- Wellman House, Forestville (1962)
- Sussex House, Sydney (1973)
- Helen Keller House, Woollahra (1973)
- Glenmore Country Club, Glenmore (1974)
- Thorpe House, Palm Beach (1978)
- Hamilton House, Bilgola Beach (1979)
- Sydney Boys High School additions, Moore Park (1985)

== Political career ==
In the 1980s Gruzman joined the Anti-Wall Committee formed to protect the Sydney Opera House from nearby urban development. In 1997 he chaired the renamed "Save East Circular Quay Committee".

In the 1990s Gruzman became politically active and was elected first as a councilor and then mayor of Woollahra, on a platform of responsible urban development. He was a critic of urban planning in Sydney, and also Sydney architects, notably Harry Seidler. Both his architectural criticism and time as mayor were controversial.

== Career as a teacher ==
Gruzman began teaching at the University of New South Wales in the 1960s with a number of contemporary modernist architects such as Bill Lucas and Harry Howard. He became an adjunct professor and, as a critic of shortening teaching hours and increasing class size, was known for using Saturdays and public holidays to give extra classes to his students at his own home. In 2002 he established two student awards at the Faculty of the Built Environment, both for the best use of urban design in architecture. In his studio practise, beginning from the 1950s, he also employed and trained many notable Sydney architects, including Pritzker Prize winner Glenn Murcutt.

== Portrait and memoirs ==
In 1970, Gruzman was the subject of the winning entry for the Archibald Prize, painted by Eric Smith. Gruzman sat for Smith several times, and commissioned Smith to contribute mosaics and stained glass for buildings he designed, including the South Head and District Synagogue in Rose Bay, as well as paintings Smith produced for the houses of his clients. Eric Smith later painted Gruzman's client and gallery owner Rudy Komon in 1981, again winning the Archibald Prize.

Most of Gruzman's houses were photographed by Max Dupain and David Moore.

Gruzman's memoirs, incorporated into a book written by Philip Goad and featuring many of the Dupain and Moore photographs, was published posthumously in 2006 by Craftsman House.

== Honours ==
An exhibition of Gruzman's work was held at the RAIA NSW Chapter in 1983, and a retrospective was held in 1992 at the Rex Irwin Gallery in Sydney.

Gruzman was appointed a Member of the Order of Australia (AM) in the 1985 Australia Day Honours.

The Margot and Neville Gruzman Award for Urban Design in Architecture was named after Gruzman acknowledging his commitment to teaching of architecture and urban design at the University of New South Wales. The award is given to the best fourth year student, and an award for best final year architecture student whose design studio project best recognises the importance of urban design in architecture.
