= Sydney Ancher =

Australian architect

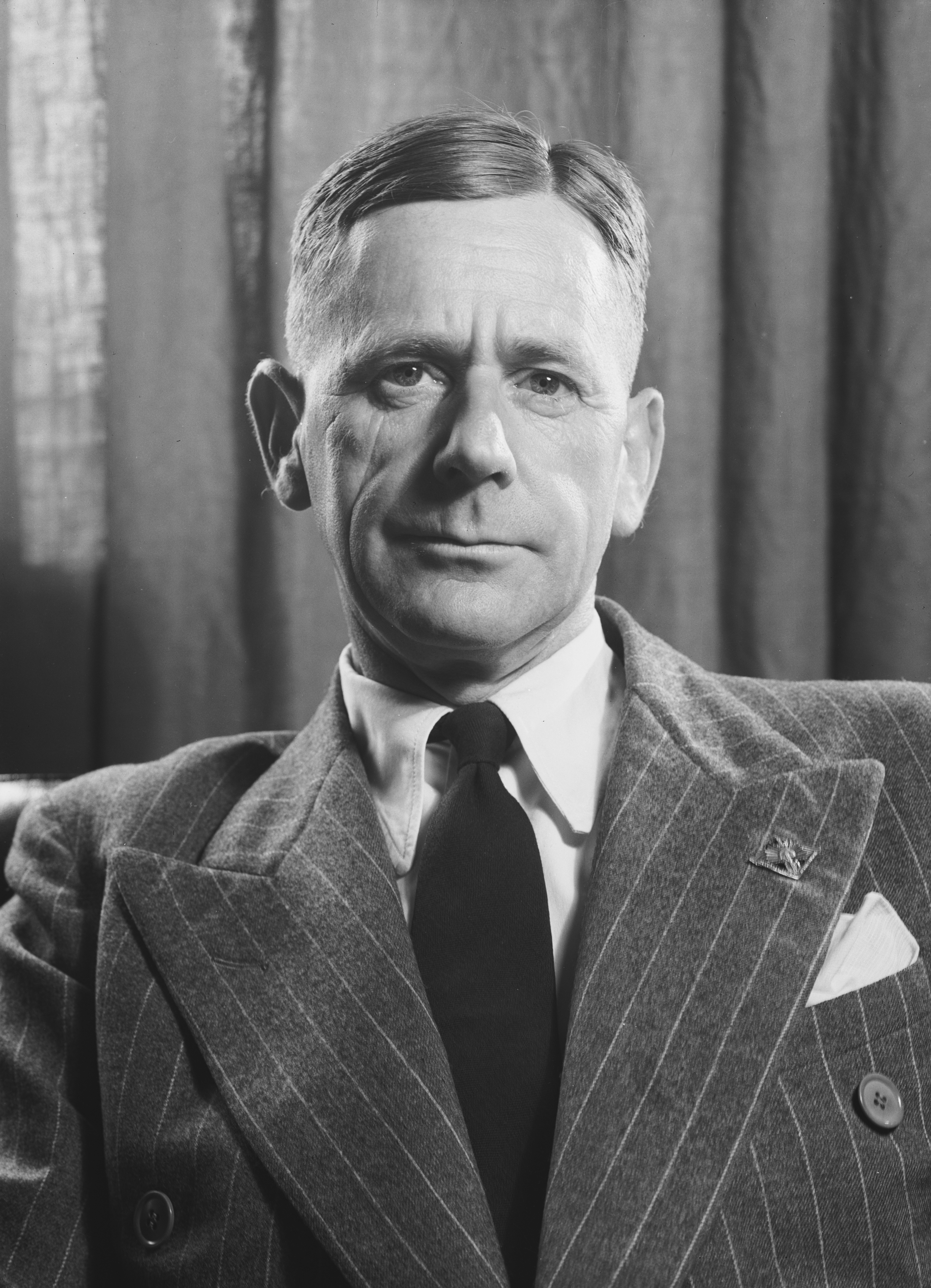
- Ancher in December 1948
- Born: Sydney Edward Cambrian Ancher; 25 February 1904; Woollahra, New South Wales
- Died: 8 December 1979 (aged 75); Waratah, Newcastle, Australia
- Education: Sydney Technical College
- Occupation: Architect
- Years active: 1924–1966
- Spouse: Aaletha Ethel Hasemern (1926—1970)
- Parent(s): Edward Ancher, Ethel Parsons
- Awards: Sir John Sulman Medal, 1945; Australian Institute of Architects Gold Medal, 1975
- Practice: Prevost & Ancher, Ancher Mortlock and Murray (1952—1964), Ancher Mortlock Murray and Woolley (1964—1975), Ancher Mortlock and Woolley (1975—2013)
- Buildings: Killara House (own)
- Projects: Northbourne Housing Group, ACT

Sydney Edward Cambrian Ancher ARAIA ARIBA (25 February 1904—8 December 1979), was an Australian architect from Woollahra, Sydney. His fascination with Europe contributed to the introduction of European internationalism in Australia. He also had a significant impact on the establishment of modern domestic architecture and the Sydney School.

== Early life ==
Sydney Ancher was the son of New Zealand journalist Edward Albert Ancher and his Australian wife Ethel Puah, née Parsons. He was educated at Mosman Superior Public, North Sydney Boys’ High and Sydney Technical High School.

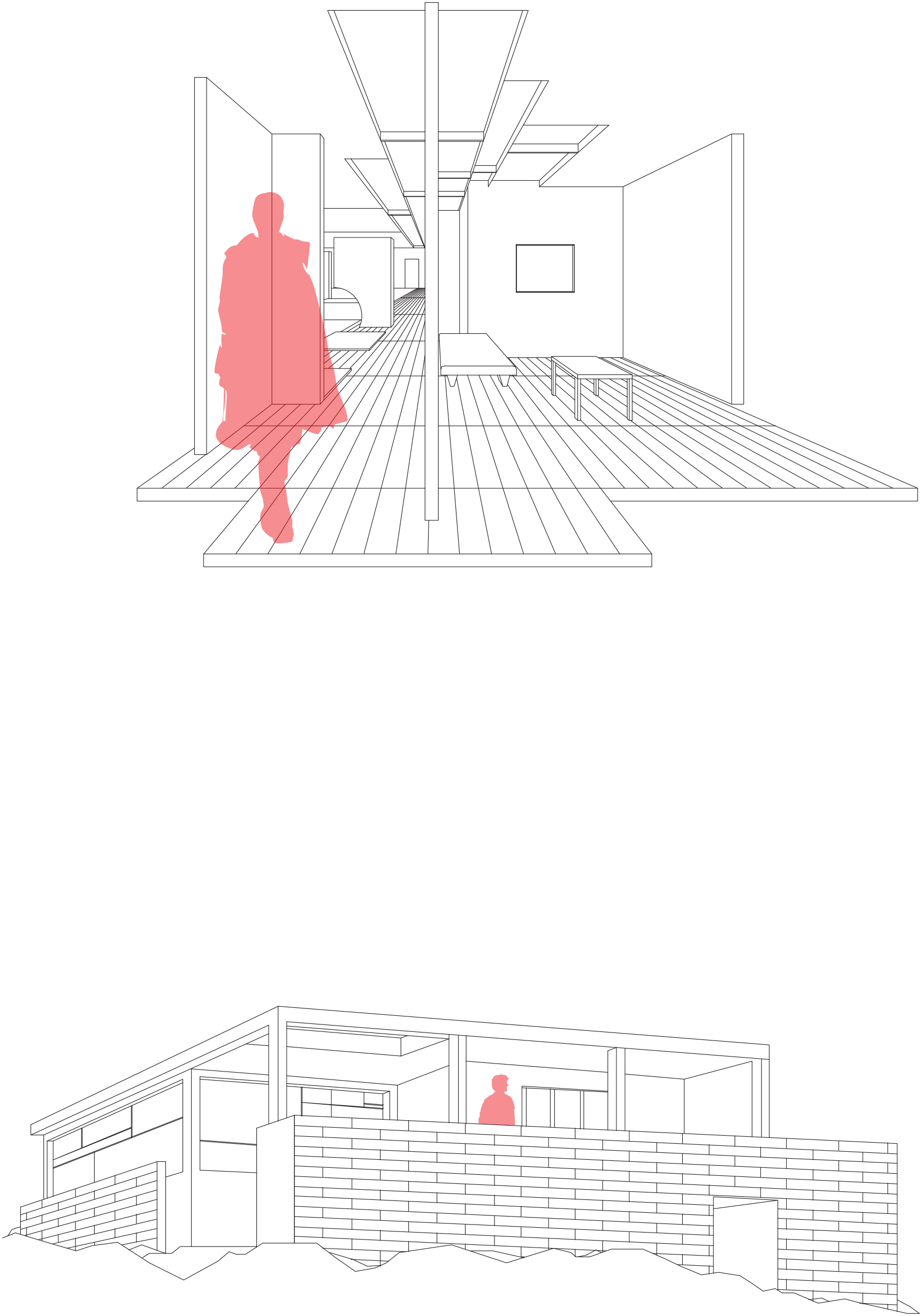
Sydney Ancher’s House was constructed in 1955, 15 Bogota Avenue, Cremorne Point. The two story dwelling comprises a lower garage and upper living quarters with an open patio space. The interior has varnished wooden flooring and a lighting system made from a series of rectangles.

== Architecture career ==
From 1924 Ancher undertook architectural studies at the Sydney Technical College at night and qualified as an architect in 1929. Ancher was articled to the architect E.W.S. Wakeley between 1924—1926 and between 1926—1930 gained a range of architectural experiences with Wunderlich Limited and architects Prevost, Synnot & Ruwald, and Ross & Rowe. In 1931 he was awarded the Australian medallion and the Byera Hadley travelling scholarship.

After working with Reginal Prevost (as Prevost & Ancher), Sydney Ancher founded his solo practice in 1946 before co-founding Ancher, Mortlock and Murray with his assistants Stuart Murray and Bryce Mortlock in 1952. Young architect Ken Woolley was added to the company name in 1964 becoming Ancher Mortlock Murray and Woolley, until Stuart Murray departed in 1975, when Ancher Mortlock and Woolley was established.

== Notable Projects ==
- Prevost House, 65 Kambala Road, Bellevue Hill, NSW, 1937 (As Prevost & Ancher)
- Ancher House (Poyntzfield), 3 Maytone Avenue, Killara, NSW, 1945. Awarded Sir John Sulman Medal, 1945.
- Ancher House II, and Maytone Avenue group of houses, Killara, NSW, 1947.
- Hamill House, 4 Maytone Avenue, Killara, NSW, 1948
- Farley House, North Curl Curl, NSW, 1948
- House, Killeaton Street, St Ives, NSW, 1950
- Laverty House, 207 Eastern Road, Wahroonga, NSW, 1953
- Ancher House III, 15 Bogota Avenue, Cremorne Point, NSW, 1957
- Northbourne Housing Group, Canberra, ACT, 1962

== Recognition ==
In 1945 Ancher was awarded the prestigious Sulman Medal for his own house in Killara.

In later years he dedicated himself to architectural education, receiving the RAIA Gold Medal in 1975 for his efforts.

In 2007 the ACT Chapter of the Australian Institute of Architects recognised his legacy with the Sydney Ancher Award as the named award for Residential Architecture, Multiple Housing.

== Family life ==
On 26 November 1926 he married Aaletha Ethel Hasemer, a stenographer, at the Presbyterian Church, Mosman, Australia.

== Death ==
Ancher retired in 1966. His wife died in 1970 and he died on 8 December 1979 in hospital at Waratah. He was cremated.
