= Peter Johnson (architect) =

Australian architect and administrator

Emeritus Professor Peter Johnson AC
- Born: Richard Norman Johnson; 15 December 1923; Armadale, Victoria
- Died: 2003 (aged 79–80)
- Citizenship: Australia
- Education: University of Sydney
- Occupations: RAAF Pilot, Architect, Professor, Chancellor
- Years active: 1953—1998
- Spouse: Jane Meade–Waldo
- Children: Chris, Tim, Simon
- Parent(s): Frank Johnson, Marie Johnson
- Awards: Wilkinson Award 1964; RAIA Gold Medal 1985
- Practice: McConnel Smith and Johnson [MSJ]

(Peter) Richard Norman Johnson AC (1923–2003) served with the Royal Australian Air Force during World War II and was a distinguished architect, educator, professor and university administrator in his native Australia.

== Early life ==
Johnson was born in Armadale, Victoria to Frank and Marian Johnson and later attended Bellevue Hill Public School and Sydney Boys High School.

== World War II ==
Johnson spent one year studying engineering at Sydney Technical College in 1941 before enlisting in the army as a Cadet Engineer on 6 January 1942 at Waverley Park, Bondi, New South Wales, not long after his 18th birthday. By June 1942 he had transferred to the RAAF and was later sent to Canada for additional training.

After completing his training, Flight Officer Johnson arrived in England and spent his leave at Stonewall, Kent. It was here he met Jane Meade-Waldo who he married on 24 March 1944. Eighteen days later, Jane received news that Johnson's Lancaster Bomber had been shot down and crashed during a night bombing mission over France on 11 April 1944. Johnson and his navigator E.J. Burchell parachuted from their stricken aircraft north of Amiens. Johnson was disguised as a mute peasant and hidden by the French Resistance for almost five months in and around Amiens until the town was liberated by British troops on 31 August 1944 in the Battle of the Mons pocket. He was evacuated from Bayeux and returned to the United Kingdom on 4 September 1944.

== Architecture career ==
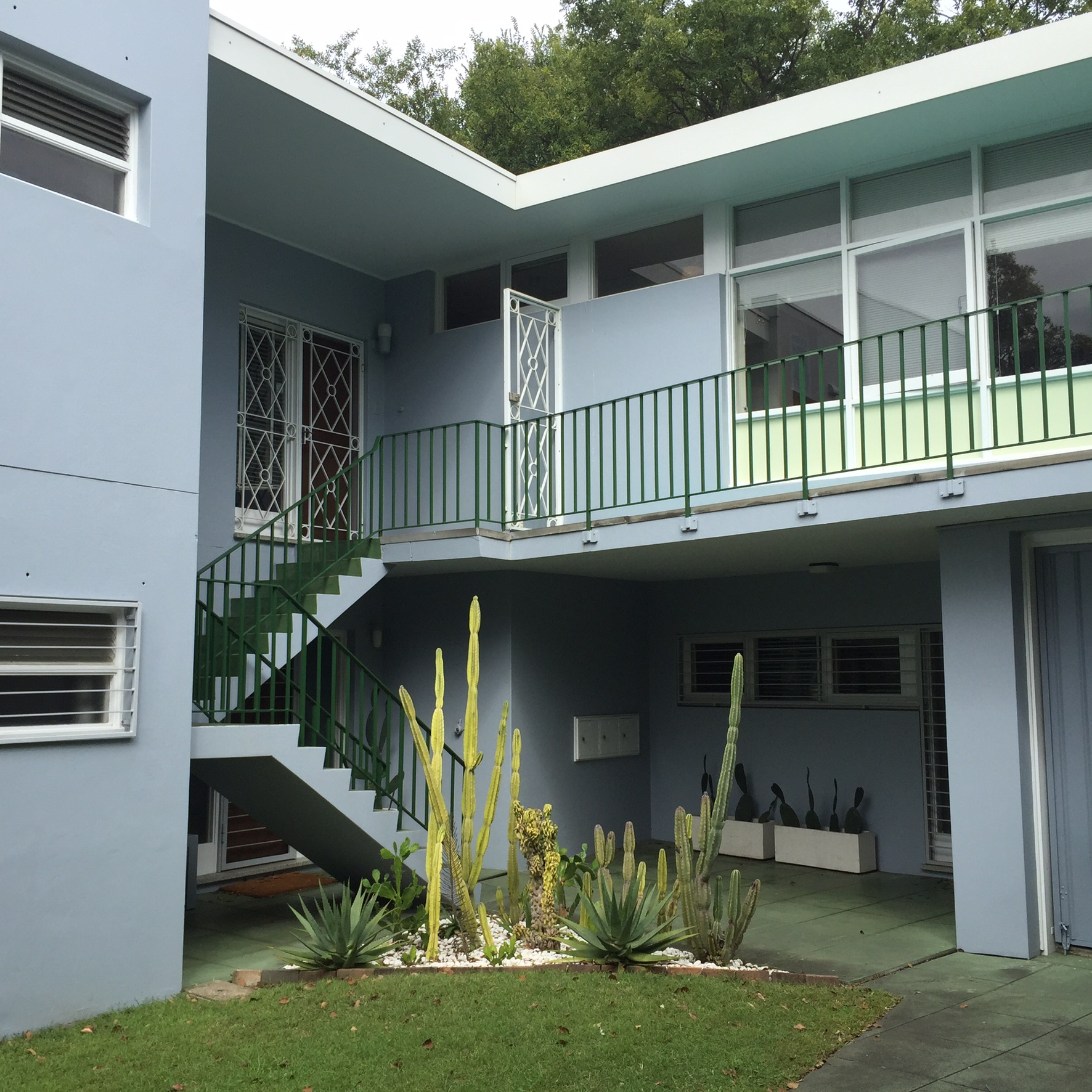
Hollinworth Stanmore

After the war, Johnson studied architecture at the University of Sydney, School of Architecture. Following his graduation he entered the architectural firm of Kenneth McConnel. In 1954, they were joined by Stanley Smith and founded McConnel Smith and Johnson. In 1960, Johnson emerged as a leading creative talent and became the founding president of the Architectural Society. In the early 1960s the firm designed a block of apartments for the theatre producer and director May Hollinworth in Cambridge Street, Stanmore. Hollinworth left the building in her will to the Adult Deaf and Dumb Society of New South Wales. The building still stands and the four apartments are now owned independently. Johnson's family house in Chatswood won the 1964 RAIA Wilkinson Award, influencing the development of the Sydney School. In 1967, Johnson was appointed Professor of Architecture at the University of Sydney and was head of the school of undergraduate studies between 1968–1986. In 1988, he became chancellor of the University of Technology, Sydney.

== Notable works ==
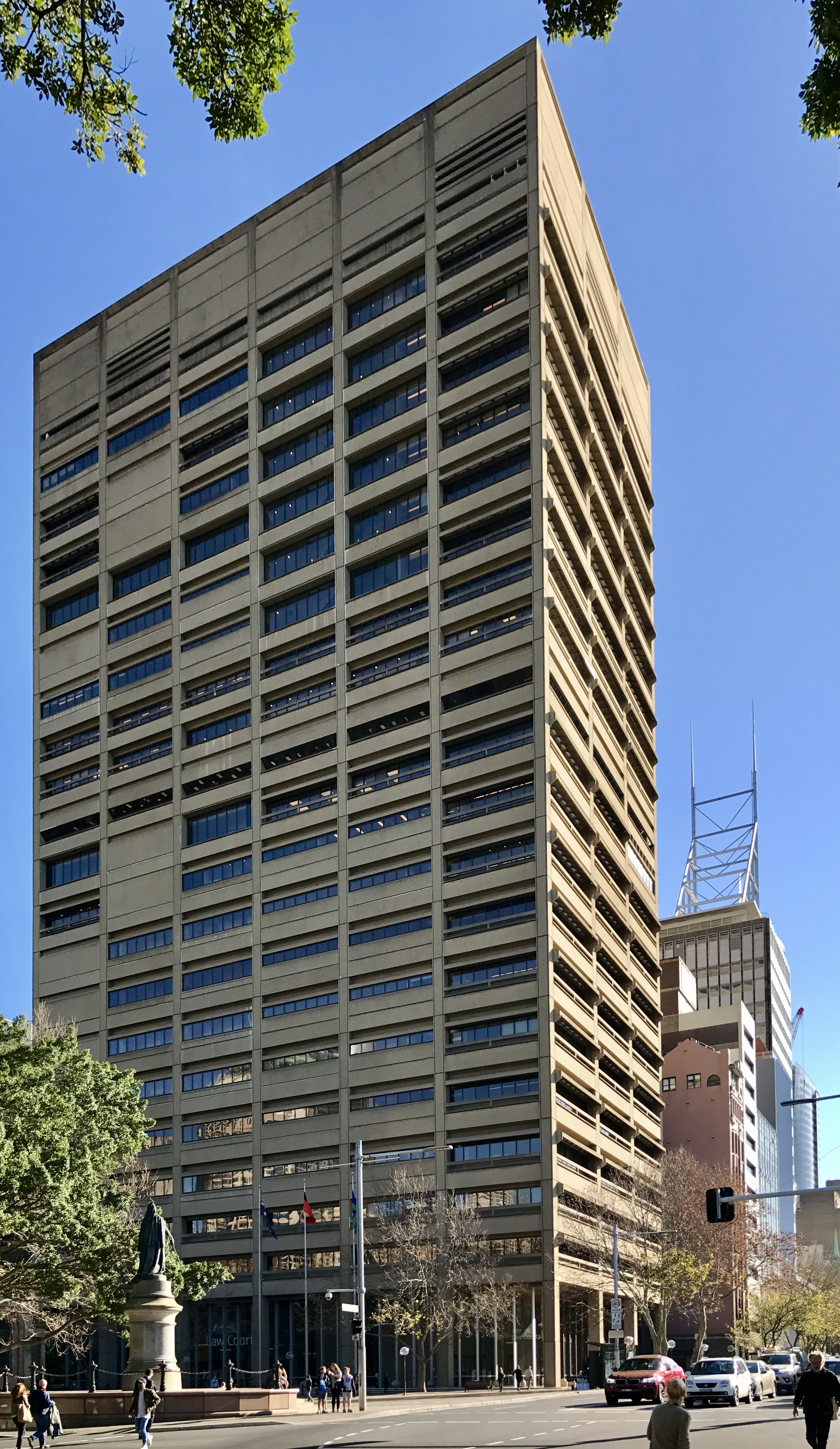
Law Courts Building Queens Square Sydney

- Hollinworth (early 1960s) 82 Cambridge Street, Stanmore
- Chatswood House, family home (1963)
- Kindersley House, 20—22 O'Connell Street, Sydney (1958)
- Swire House, 8 Spring Street (1960)
- Metropolitan and Water and Drainage Board Building, Bathurst Street, Sydney (1960)
- University of Sydney Law School, 148A—160 King Street, Sydney (1969)
- Law Courts Building, 237—241 Macquarie Street, Queens Square, Sydney (1976)
- Benjamin Offices, Belconnen

== Awards and recognition ==
In 1964, Johnson was awarded the Royal Australian Institute of Architects Wilkinson Award for his Chatswood Residence.

In 1979, Johnson received the Officer of the Order of Australia for service to architecture and was promoted to Companion of the Order of Australia in 2002.

In 1985 he was presented with the RAIA Gold Medal by the Australian Institute of Architects.

In 1987, the architectural archive of the National Library, Canberra was named the Peter Johnson Architectural Archive.

In the late 1990s, UTS named their new home of Faculty of Design, Architecture and Building the Peter Johnson Building.

== Positions held ==
- President of the NSW Chapter of the Royal Australian Institute of Architects 1966—1970
- National President of the Royal Australian Institute of Architects, 1980—1981
- Life Fellowship of the Royal Australian Institute of Architects
- Fellow of the Royal Institute of British Architects
- Fellow of the American Institute of Architects
- Fellow of the Royal Canadian Institute of Architects
- Foundation Chairman, Architectural Society
- Professor of Architecture, University of Sydney
- Chancellor of the University of Technology, Sydney
- Inaugural Chair of the Conference of Heads of Schools of Architecture, Australia
- Doctor of Architecture (Honoris Causa), University of Sydney
- Doctor of University (Honoris Causa) University of Technology, Sydney
- Chairman, Board of Directors of Architecture Media
- Board Member, National Trust of Australia (NSW)
- Chair, Conservation Committee and Architectural Advisory Committee, National Trust of Australia

== Bibliography ==
- Johnson, Peter (1979), Architectural education in the Commonwealth : A Survey of Schools, Dept. of Architecture, University of Sydney for the Commonwealth Board of Architectural Education of the Commonwealth Association of Architects, ISBN 0909425175
- Johnson, Peter (1982), Leslie Wilkinson: A Practical Idealist, Valadon Publishing, Woollahra, NSW, ISBN 9780959420210
- Johnson, Peter (1987), Architectural education in the Commonwealth : A Second Survey of Schools, Dept. of Architecture, University of Sydney for the Commonwealth Board of Architectural Education of the Commonwealth Association of Architects, ISBN 090942537X
