= John James (Australian architect) =

Australian architect, academic, historian and psychotherapist

John James OAM
- Born: John Roger Haughton James; 1931 (age 94–95); London, United Kingdom
- Education: University of Melbourne (1949–1953), University of Sydney (1963–1966), University of NSW 1988 PhD
- Occupations: Architect, Builder, Academic, Historian, Psychotherapist
- Years active: 1957–1971 (Architect)
- Spouse: Hilary James
- Children: Cassandra, Rebecca and Emily
- Parent(s): Richard 'Jimmy' Haughton James, Charlotte 'Terry' Stevens
- Awards: New South Wales Enduring Architecture Award 2016 & National Award for Enduring Architecture 2016
- Practice: John James and Associates
- Buildings: Reader's Digest Building, Sydney
- Website: johnjames.com.au

John Roger Haughton James OAM (born 1931) is a British-born Australian architect and historian who turned to the study of Early Gothic architecture and sculpture, and in particular the Chartres Cathedral. At the same time James studied psychotherapy and practised for 30 years while writing and publishing on medieval architecture.

== Family life ==
James was born in London, and landed in Australia on his eighth birthday. His parents were Richard 'Jimmy' Haughton James, designer and painter, and Charlotte 'Terry' Stevens.

James married Hilary Kelly and they have three children. After working in England, Sweden, Italy and British West Africa, the couple returned to Australia.

== Architecture education ==
James entered the University of Melbourne in 1949 to study architecture under Professor Brian Lewis, and was awarded a degree with honours in 1953. His instructors included leading Modernist Roy Grounds, Robin Boyd, Frederick Romberg and Fritz Janeba. He also completed a three-year sub–major in Art History under Professor Joseph Burke, under whom he surveyed the Melbourne terrace house and its cast-iron tracery, which is now held in the Dixon Library, Sydney. He was inspired by Geoffrey Serle to investigate the New Guard, the Sydney fascist movement set up to remove the Lang Labor government in the 1930s.

James received a Master of Building Science under professor Henry Jacob Cowan at the University of Sydney in 1966, with a thesis on site control on large buildings, and in 1988 he gained a PhD in medieval architecture from the University of NSW, which was published as The Template-makers of the Paris Basin.

== Architectural practice ==
James founded his architectural practice in Sydney (1957–1971) where he considered to be part of the Sydney School in domestic architecture, akin to the California redwood houses early last century. In 1958 he became the first builder—architect to be certified by the Royal Australian Institute of Architects. He designed over 200 houses and is best known for the Reader's Digest head office (1962–1967) in Surry Hills, Sydney with a significant roof garden by Bruce Mackenzie. The building is now a protected National Heritage Monument, and considered part of the Brutalist movement in Australia. James was in partnership with Ross Yuncken from 1959 and as well with Peru Perumal from 1968. James' experience in both construction and design spurred his interest in the role of the master mason in medieval European building. While running his architectural practice he taught the history of medieval architecture and studio design at Sydney Technical College and at the University of Sydney and University of New South Wales (1966–2007).

== Recognition ==
In 2008 James was recipient of the Medal of the Order of Australia (OAM) for "Service to architecture as a practitioner, educator and historian, particularly as a leading scholar on French Gothic architectural history".

James received the American Institute of Architects Honour for Collaborative Achievement, for his work on French Gothic architecture in 2005.

In 2016 James was awarded the Australian Institute of Architects New South Wales Enduring Architecture Award and the National Award for Enduring Architecture for the Reader's Digest Building, Surry Hills nearly 50 years after its completion.

== The Contractors of Chartres Controversy ==
In 1969 he traveled to France to examine the construction history of Chartres cathedral, to see if the art-historical theories could be reconciled with the evidence in the masonry, and quickly found that the theories current at that time were incorrect. He continued this investigation at Chartres for five years, and developed the investigative technique he termed "Toichology". His first article on this research was published by Dennis Sharp in the Architecture Association Quarterly in 1972, which led to Robert Branner's assessment on what this approach could offer to scholarship. James showed how the cathedral had been built from the evidence in the masonry, and in the process redefined the constructional history of the building and presented a new view of early medieval building practice. He identified the nine master masons and analyzed their geometric methods. The monograph was published in two volumes in English, and three in French translated by local architect Dominique Maunoury. The major discoveries that caused controversy were:-

- The cathedral was built in tilted, almost annual, layers, each layer being the work of a different master mason, some of whom returned from time to time.
- The nave and the choir were built at the same time, not one after the other, and with the transepts and their porches, which were not added later.
- That geometry ruled every design decision, including the initial geometry in setting out, and the bent axis was deliberate from the beginning.
- The Royal Portal was not moved, but was erected where it is today with the western towers.
- The apogee of Gothic sculpture should therefore be dated to the reign of Phillipe Auguste, and not Saint Louis, that is, some two decades earlier.

In his study of Chartres he used his building experience and drafting ability to produce over 300 measured drawings to demonstrate not only the history of the cathedral, but to construct an investigative technique for medieval architecture. His work is akin to that of the French archéologues who focus on archaeological analysis, a group including Arnold Wolff, Richard Hamman-MacLean and Jan van der Meulen. Their work commonly appeared in the monograph form, a "congenial vehicle for exercising the most precise and detailed examination of a great church's fabric". James determined that permanent architects did not exist for most Gothic churches before 1240, but that nearly all ecclesiastical buildings were constructed by bands of contractors who moved from site to site with their workforce. It was a major revision to the accepted opinion that discontinuous contracting was the norm. Though James had received a three-year training in Art History and was a skilled architect/builder for thirteen years, his views came up against the established canons of the profession. Some historians have still not accepted the thesis, though it has been obvious to professional architects. Some termed his views "eccentric", or "unusual", principally Steven Murray and Lon Shelby, was mainly based on theoretical grounds, without any re-examination of the evidence in the structure itself. Through the discussions that followed, James recognized the greater complexity of the medieval building scene. Yet, as all his later work shows, he remains firmly convinced that builders, like carvers, were peripatetic, and that at least before the mid-thirteenth century design control was not held by a single permanent master. James' demotion of the architect as prime designer may have inadvertently been driven by the popular "death of the artist" notion among art historians of the 1970s and 1980s. To gain a deeper appreciation of the medieval experience, he took his family on the pilgrimage route from Chartres to Compostella (walking over 400 kilometers) in 1973. From 1977 James presented his findings at lectures at over 70 universities and colleges in the US, France, England and Australia, including Oxford, Harvard, Princeton and Berkeley. From these lectures he wrote a more popular history of Chartres. He hoped to repeat this approach on the cathedral of Durham, Southwell Minster, and a group of key buildings in France associated with Chartres, in particular Saint-Denis-en-France and Notre-Dame-du-Fort in Étampes. Appointed to various teaching and research posts at a dozen universities.

== Creation of Gothic Architecture Project ==
In the 1980s James sought out other work by the masons he identified at Chartres. This led him to undertake a three-year Survey of Early Gothic churches in northern France, and discovered that before the 1220s they were restricted to the Lutetian limestone region around Paris. At the time, less than one quarter of the churches with Early Gothic work had been studied, or even listed. After visiting more than 3,500 churches he inventoried over 1500 in the Paris area from the 1050-1250 period. The Survey was published in 1984.

The fundamental difficulty in medieval studies is imprecise chronology. With only a few buildings having firmly documented dates, and then for only parts, medieval studies have lacked the basis for detailed historic analysis, unlike the contemporary Italian Renaissance. James' first approach was to use the profiles and design of elements, and construction strategies to identify the master masons, and to use that as a basis for a chronology, but he finally realized this approach would not be effective. The analysis of building methods and strategies was published as The Template-makers of the Paris Basin in 1989. It explains the investigative possibilities of Toichology and affirmed his conclusion from the Chartres study that churches, even the major ones, were built in many small campaigns, each directed by different masters.

James has photographed and catalogued over 40,000 of the carved capitals from this period. James realised that changing style, or fashion, in carving could be the key to dating, and hence to the possibility of a more detailed history of early Gothic architecture and sculpture. This showed there were specific moments of stylistic change brought about by the Crusades and in the 1170s a dramatic redefinition of the carved capitals. These formed distinct boundaries in medieval culture that may be used to frame a chronology. The first flying buttresses were thought to date from the 1180s, but using these techniques James argued that this invention should be moved back thirty years and similarly with the pointed arch and the earliest rib vaults.

James has avoided permanent academic appointments to concentrate on this research as an independent scholar, enabled by various grants that have come mainly from the Australian Research Council. In spite of papers offered at conferences in the US, UK and France, the lack of students has tended to isolate his work from the mainstream trends of Art History. The most recent is the first five volumes of an intended nine-volume Thesaurus of French Early Gothic architecture. These five, containing photographs of nearly all the carved capitals in the region before 1250, were published between 2002 and 2008, with the shortened title of The Ark of God. The other four volumes were intended to focus on chronology, inventions, rib vaults, the portals and a reconsideration of the history of the Gothic style, but were abandoned due to the dramatic decline in academic library acquisitions. The construction analysis and the indexed capitals have been placed online, with over 30,000 images. The books themselves were self-published by West Grinstead Pty Ltd, a company he set up to print and distribute academic books.

James used a connoisseurship approach akin to [Giovanni Morelli]'s to identify over 200 of the individual carvers before 1180, and 20 draft papers were made available online as the Master Carvers Series (2010–2014). Forty of his essays have been collected into one volume In Search of the Unknown in Medieval Architecture. From the capitals study, and especially that on the 263 carvings in the Laon cathedral gallery (ca.1163) James' analysis has redefined the carvers roles and professional relationships, some travel patterns and what appears to be Rites of Passage from Journeyman to Master.

== Therapist, as teacher and practitioner ==
From 1983 James and his wife Hilary studied psychology, both professionally and personally, under a number of teachers, in particular Bhakti Carrisbrooke and [Hal Stone]. They concentrated on Sandplay and created new dynamic techniques that are more Jungian than Freudian. James condensed this into a short book, Notes to Transformation. In 1996 the James's founded The Crucible Centre on a 260-acre property in the Blue Mountains for teaching therapy techniques to students. Three years later James created the first tertiary-accredited Post-Graduate Diploma course in Transpersonal Psychotherapy, from which he wrote The Great Field. After two bushfires the centre was closed in 2016 and, with Hilary, James moved to Brogo on the NSW South Coast.

== Environmental activism ==
Starting with a talk he gave on environmental pollution in Seattle in 1980, James has tried to help people understand the science of Global Warming. Besides many lectures, he formed the Crisis Coalition in 2006, and the Eco Platform in 2015, each with their own websites. He edits a weekly email Newsletter and has often been called to talk on public radio in Australia, the UK and the US. James recognized the impact that climatic change had on the architecture of the twelfth century.

His philosophy on life is to "Live life to the fullest, yet remain unattached to the outcome."

== Bibliography ==
Books and selected articles by John James:

- James, John (1979–81), The contractors of Chartres, 2 vols., West Grinstead: Wyong.
- James, John (1984), "An investigation into the uneven distribution of churches in the Paris Basin, 1140-1240", Art Bulletin, lxvi, 13–46.
- James, John (1989), The Template-makers of the Paris Basin, West Grinstead: Leura.
- James, John (1990) The master masons of Chartres, Routledge: London, NY, Chartres and Sydney.
- James, John (1992), "Evidence for flying buttresses before 1180", Journal of the Society of Architectural Historians, li, 261–287.
- James, John (1994), Notes to Transformation, West Grinstead: Leura.
- James, John (2002), The Creation of Gothic Architecture - an Illustrated Thesaurus: The Ark of God, vols 1–2, Part A: "The Evolution of Foliate Capitals in the Paris Basin 1170 to 1250", West Grinstead: London and Hartley Vale.
- James, John (2005), "The peaked arch, and the earliest domical rib vaults in the Paris Basin", Avista Forum Journal, xv, 3–7
- James, John (2006) The Creation of Gothic Architecture - an Illustrated Thesaurus: The Ark of God, vol 3: "The Evolution of Foliate Capitals in the Paris Basin: the archaic capitals prior to 1130", West Grinstead: London and Hartley Vale.
- James, John (2007), The Great Field, Soul at play in a conscious universe, Energy Press,
- James, John (2007), In Search of the unknown in medieval architecture, London: Pindar Press.
- James, John (2008), The Creation of Gothic Architecture - an Illustrated Thesaurus: The Ark of God, vols. 4 and 5: "The Evolution of Foliate Capitals in the Paris Basin: the formal capitals 1130 to 1170", West Grinstead: London and Hartley Vale.
- James, John (2014), "Boundaries that delineate periods in art-history between 1090 and 1180" Avista Forum Journal, XXII 23–46.
