= Arthur Denis Winston =

Professor Denis Winston CBE
- Born: Arthur Denis Winston; 27 July 1908; Liverpool, England
- Died: 19 May 1980 (aged 71); Penang, Malaysia
- Education: University of Liverpool (B.Arch., 1931); Harvard University
- Occupations: Town planner, academic
- Spouse: Joan May Elliott
- Parent(s): Edward Michael Winston, Maria Linda Holt

Arthur Denis Winston CBE (1908–1980) was an architect and town planner who became Australia's first professor of town planning at the University of Sydney. In 1951 he led the amalgamation of state based planning associations into a national body, of which he became the first president.

== Career and works ==
Arthur published “Sydney’s Great Experiment: The Progress of the Cumberland County Plan” in 1957. This was an illustrated and independent account of the development of the Cumberland County Plan for general readers.

He acted as a consultant in the planning of Adaminaby and Jindabyn from the 1950s to the 1970s.

== Recognition ==
Professor Denis Winston was appointed an Order of the British Empire (CBE) — Commander (Civil) in the 1979 New Year Honours with a citation for urban planning.

== Legacy ==
The Denis Winston Memorial Lecture, Henry Halloran Trust, is held annually at the University of Sydney.

=== Speakers ===
- 1986 — Gordon Cherry: 'A changing profession in a changing world'
- 2023 — Rob Stokes: 'Wicked Assumptions: How planning premises from the past shape the cities of tomorrow'
- 2024 — Caroline Butler-Bowdon: 'The Golden Thread in Public Life – Parks & Libraries as Cornerstones'
- 2025 — Tina Havelock Stevens: 'Regenerative Spaces? Public Art and Engagement in Urban Placemaking'
