= Hilton, Chatswood =

Hilton
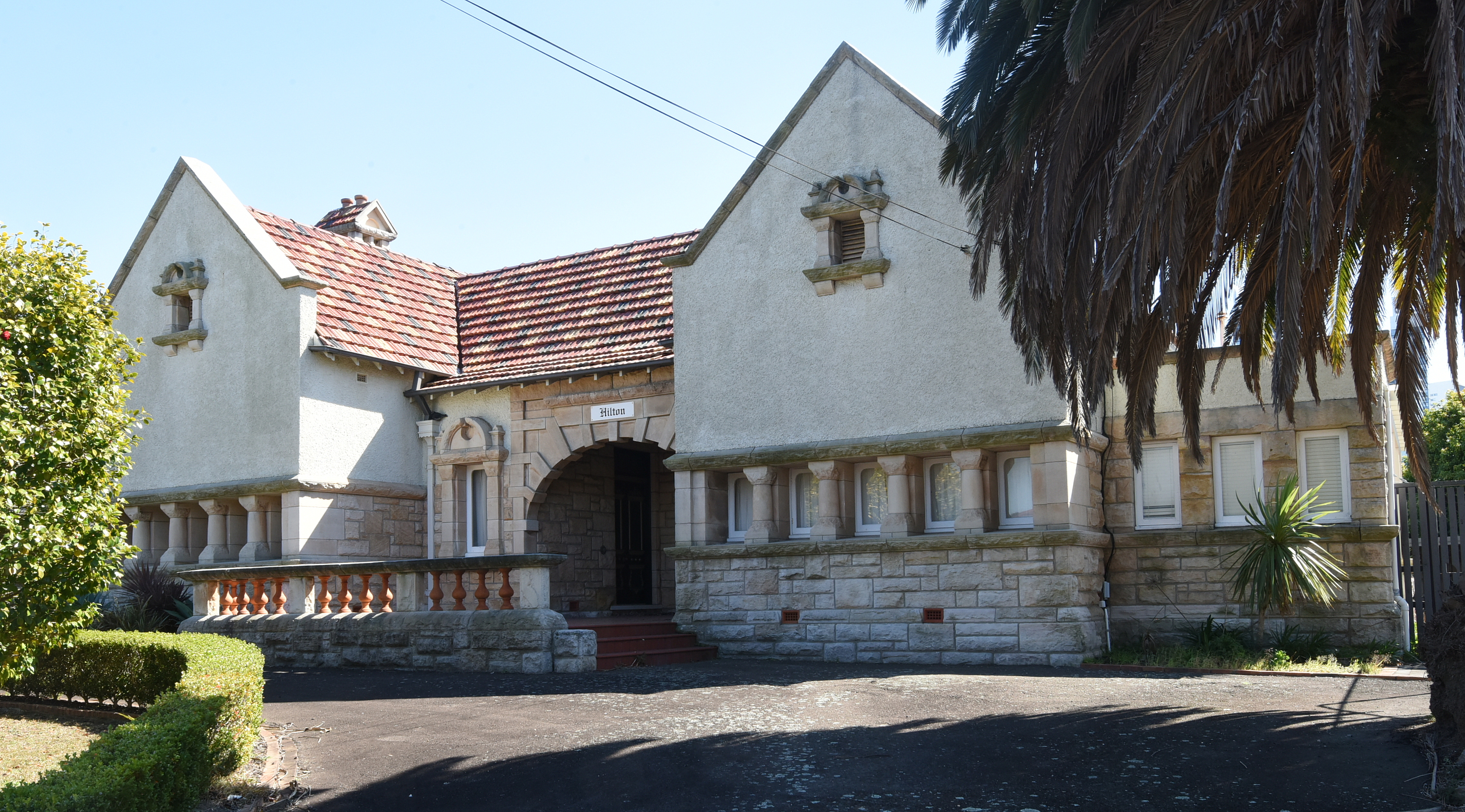
- Hilton

- Location within Sydney Location within Australia
- 33°48′09″S 151°11′02″E
- Location: 313-315 Mowbray Road, Chatswood, City of Willoughby, New South Wales, Australia

History
- Built: 1903
- Built for: W. H. Hoskings

Site notes
- Architect: Phoebe Borchard

New South Wales Heritage Register
- Official name: Hilton; Broxbourne
- Type: State heritage (built)
- Designated: 2 April 1999
- Reference no.: 374
- Type: House
- Category: Residential buildings (private)

Hilton is a heritage-listed residence in Chatswood, New South Wales, a suburb of Sydney, Australia. It was designed by Albert Borchard and built during 1903. It is also known as Broxbourne. It was added to the New South Wales State Heritage Register on 2 April 1999.

== History ==
Hilton was constructed in 1903 and designed by Albert Borchard for W. H. Hoskings, an industrialist. Hoskings was the father of architect Archer Hoskings and cricketer Arthur Hoskings.

Upon Hoskings' death in 1906, the property was occupied and later purchased by the Reverend Alexander McKinley. McKinley occupied the house until 1924 when he sold it to Mrs Elfie Symington for A£2,350. The house has stylistic and historic links with Seven Gables (251 Mowbray Road), also said to have been designed by Albert Borchard and built about the same time. Broxbourne was later referred to as Hilton which was apparently named after the father of a more recent owner.

An Interim Heritage Order was made over Hilton on 19 November 1982 in response to a proposal to alter the building with a Cape Cod extension. A Permanent Conservation Order was placed over the property on 2 August 1985 to assist with appropriate management of the house. It was transferred to the State Heritage Register on 2 April 1999.

== Description ==
Hilton is considered by some to be an example of the Romanesque Revival style of architecture. Massively built using three feet thick slabs of stone, the house is characterised by its use of truncated stone columns between recessed windows with heavy, rusticated stone quoining to the windows. The front elevation is dominated by two elegant matching stuccoed gables.

The roof is composed of variegated terracotta tiles of a Marseilles pattern and is dominated nu a tiled pediment-shaped capping.

Internally, roughly half the house is still in its original condition. Of particular significance are the massively dressed stone fireplaces, designed around a keystone with elaborate overmantels. Some metal Wunderlich ceilings remain intact. Also remaining are several pieces of the original press-carved joinery.

The surrounding garden wall with wrought iron gates echoes the design and heavy stonework of the front facade. Several mature Canary Island Palma consolidate the heavy exotic atmosphere of Hilton. The fountain, tennis court and swimming pool all later additions. A large garage at the corner of Nea and Young Streets is attached to the house.

== Heritage listing ==
As of 8 August 2013, Hilton, constructed in 1903, was of State heritage significance as an example of the Romanesque Revival style of architecture. It provides a unique and unusual contrast in architecture to the immediate area. Hilton is associated with the architect Albert Borchard and the industrialist W. H. Hoskins.

Hilton was listed on the New South Wales State Heritage Register on 2 April 1999.

== See also ==
- Australian residential architectural styles
