= Windsor Gardens =

Windsor Gardens may refer to:

- 32 Windsor Gardens, the home of Paddington Bear
- Windsor Gardens (Chatswood), a heritage-listed property in the Sydney suburb of Chatswood, in Australia
- Windsor Gardens, South Australia
- Windsor Gardens (MBTA station) in Norwood, Massachusetts
