= Bill Lucas (architect) =

Sydney based Australian architect and utopian

- Born: Wilfred Ernest Lucas; 31 December 1924; Sydney, NSW, Australia
- Died: 10 September 2001 (aged 76); Thredbo, NSW, Australia
- Education: University of Sydney
- Occupation: Architect
- Years active: 1950—2001
- Known for: Sydney School
- Awards: New South Wales Enduring Architecture Award 2022
- Buildings: The Glass House

Bill Lucas (31 December 1924 – 10 September 2001) was an Australian architect known well for the houses he designed along the Bulwark in Castlecrag, Sydney. While practicing as a full-time architect, Lucas also worked as a part-time lecturer at the School of Architecture of the University of New South Wales for a decade.

== Personal life ==
Lucas was born in Sydney in 1924. He was drafted into the RAAF Air Crew service in 1943, where he served for three years. Lucas then went on to study architecture at the University of Sydney where he graduated with honours. Lucas also studied Visual Arts at the East Sydney Technical University. He then moved to New Zealand where he worked with Hugh Grierson Architects There, he designed his first home with his brother, Neville at Gymea Bay, Sydney. Between 1955 and 1957 he worked with Neville Gruzman, Tony Moore and Ruth Harvey where they submitted a competition entry for the Sydney Opera House. He later married Ruth Harvey. The couple designed and built the Glass House in Castlecrag, Sydney which became their family home from 1957 to 1974.

Jennifer Taylor included the Glass House in her 1972 publication, An Australian Identity on the 'Sydney School', and described it as a, "significant sprinkling of individual houses with several common form characteristics. Most of these houses are to be found in an area north of the harbour, where available sites are steep with natural bush and outcrops of Sydney sandstone." According to Taylor, the generic qualities of the Sydney School were namely the use of rough textured, self-finished materials, especially those that suggest rustic origins. A second characteristic she noted, "was a deliberate attempt to blend with and hide amongst the existing natural landscape] environment," with a preference for "brick and tile architecture, spatially complex interiors, strong surfaces and masses, disciplined plan." Many other of the architects named by Taylor, including Lucas, sit uneasily within the defining characteristics she described. Lucas' wartime service taught him to rigorously interrogate design problems and reduce them to their fundamental constituent elements. His thoughtful Rational elementaryism and climatism would later go on to be deployed fully by Glenn Murcutt, an architectural assistant in the Neville Gruzman office around the same time that Gruzman shared his workspace with Lucas.

The Glass House, Castlecrag, reduced to a single platform and sloped roof suspended in the bush with no enclosure of space is the Australian domestic equivalent of the 1851 Crystal Place framed in sawn hardwood and glass, as radical in its reductionist symbolism as Peter Carey's glass cathedral in the novel, Oscar and Lucinda. In Harry Margalit's view, the house was a "seminal building" that had a "cleansing simplicity" and asked the question: "how minimally might one live in the Sydney climate, with its temperate compass of seasons and abundance of fine days...Every aspect is informed by clear intentions, from the site preservation to the lack of applied finishes to the radical transparency."

The 1950s was a time of optimistic experiment which set up the 1960s as a decade of soft-edged Modernism. The two architecture schools, University of Sydney under Leslie Wilkinson with his Mediterranean and Arts & Crafts emphasis pointed in one direction; the University of New South Wales in a more open pragmatic regional direction. Bill Lucas shouldered the responsibility at the beginning of the 1960s for the formulation of the philosophy for design teaching and studios at UNSW, implemented by Peter Kollar, Neville Gruzman, Peter Muller, Milo Dunphy, with the Modern architectural historian Morton Herman, who had traveled with Sydney Ancher in the 1930s and witnessed German Modernism. Each was an individual personality architecturally, but they shared to a varying degree, an empathy with Frank Lloyd Wright's identification with regional landscape and interest in Japanese architecture. Leaving Walter Burley Griffin's Castlecrag for Paddington, came as a deliberate decision that saw Lucas increasingly interested and involved in issues of in urban design and heritage matters, and. much later on, the theoretical exploration, much of it through drawing, of issues surrounding standardisation of building elements and geometries for controlling architectural form. Lucas was that rarity in Australian architecture, a gentle explorer of ideas whose built oeuvre though small, nevertheless, was influential among students and contemporaries.

== The Paddington Society ==
The Lucases became actively involved in helping to prevent the suburb of Paddington from comprehensive redevelopment. Paddington was the scene of many historical sites and architecture, notably Juniper Hall and Centennial Park. They helped set up the Paddington Society which campaigned to prevent Juniper Hall from being renovated and revamped. The Society also lobbied to prevent a sports stadium from being built in Centennial Park. The society still functions today as an action group but also serves to record the historical landmarks of the area.

== Teaching career ==
Lucas helped to further develop the architecture program at the University of New South Wales, where he taught for ten years between 1965 and 1975. At this time, Lucas supervised students from UNSW, University of Sydney and the New South Wales Institute of Technology who were working on projects for R. Buckminster Fuller's World Design Science Decade.

== Later years and death ==
Until 1990 Lucas continued to design houses, such as the Sieverding House, and worked on and off with architects Julie Cracknell and Peter Lonergan Architects until his death, often visiting their Surry Hills studio. Lucas died on 10 September 2001 of a heart attack at the Moonbah ski lodge, Thredbo, that he had designed with Marion Hall Best. His children were with him at the time of his death.

== Notable projects ==
- Gymea Bay Community Hall and Gymea Bay Baby Health Centre, 1948–51
- The Glass House, 1957, designed in collaboration with Ruth Lucas, 80 The Bulwark, Castlecrag. The reduction of the building to its structural components is also visible in two neighbouring houses designed by Lucas at 76 and 78 The Bulwark, Castlecrag with Neville Lucas
- The Block House, Castlecrag, commissioned by Con and Addie Saltis, 1960
- Moonbah Ski Lodge, Thredbo with Marion Hall Best, 1956–63
- Orange Tree Grove, 8 Bennetts Grove Avenue, Paddington, (with Michael Coote) commissioned by Ian Kennedy, 1968
- Guriganya Progressive Community School, 1970
- Ruth Lucas: Bourke Aboriginal Housing with community, 1970

== Awards ==
- Forestry Commission Furniture Competition – 1956

== See also ==
- Bill and Ruth Lucas
