= The Glass House, Castlecrag =

House in Sydney, Australia

The Glass House
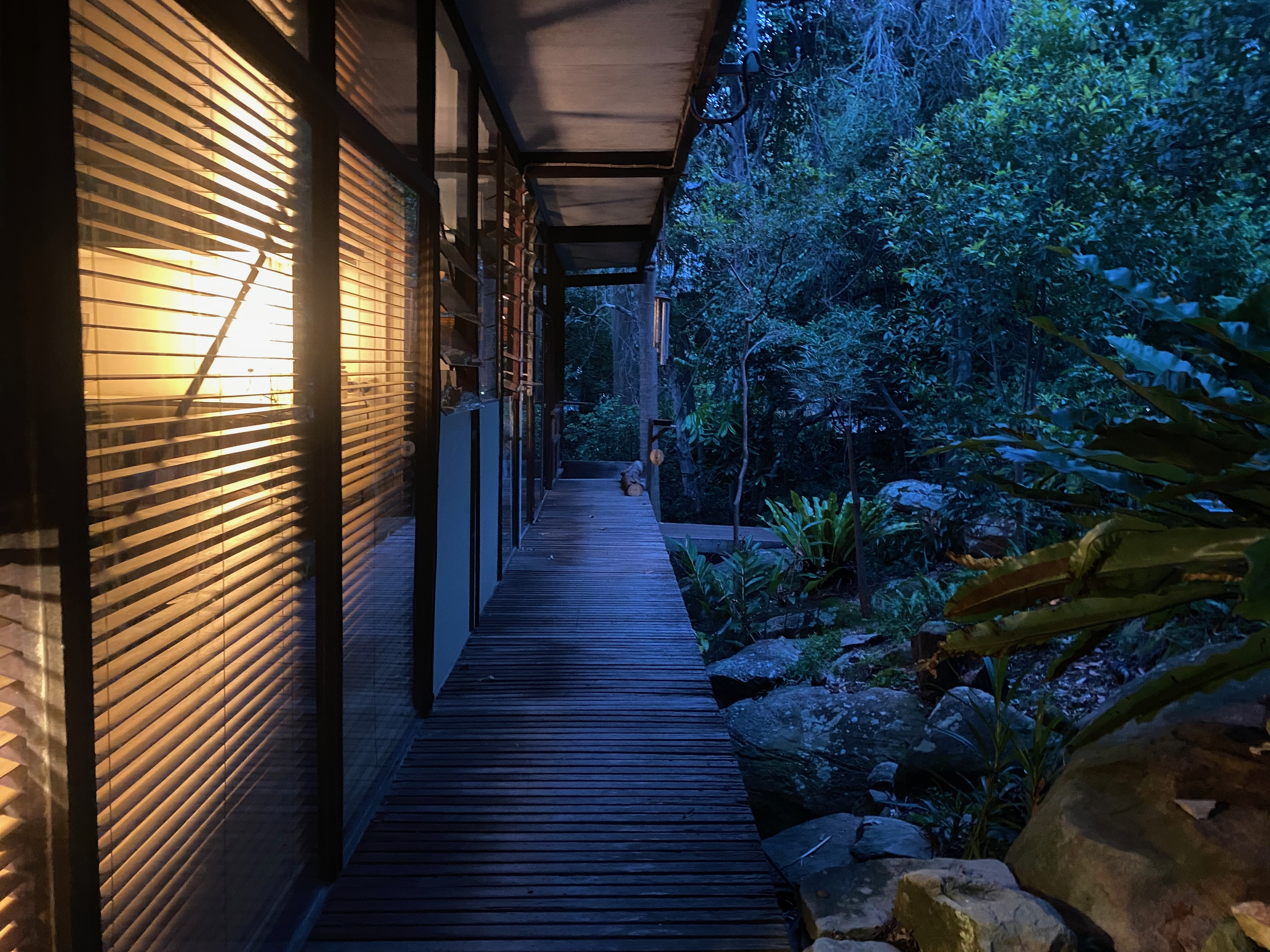

- Location within Sydney Location within Australia
- 33°48′06″S 151°13′11″E
- Location: 80 The Bulwark, Castlecrag, City of Willoughby, New South Wales, Australia

History
- Built: 1957
- Built for: Bill and Ruth Lucas

Site notes
- Architect: Bill Lucas

New South Wales Heritage Register
- Official name: The Glass House; Glasshouse; Bill Lucas House
- Type: State heritage (built)
- Designated: 21 October 2016
- Reference no.: 1981
- Type: House
- Category: Residential buildings (private)

The Glass House is a heritage-listed domestic dwelling at 80 The Bulwark, Castlecrag, Sydney, New South Wales, Australia. It was designed by Ruth and Bill Lucas. It is also known as the Glasshouse or the Lucas House. It was added to the New South Wales State Heritage Register on 21 October 2016.

== History ==
=== Construction ===
The Glass House is part of Walter Burley Griffin and Marion Mahony Griffin's 1920s subdivision. The couple had arrived in Australia in 1914, having won the competition for the design of the new national capital, Canberra. In 1920, Griffin formed the Greater Sydney Development Association Ltd. to build residential estates on three picturesque headlands in Sydney's Middle Harbour. Castlecrag was the first of these estates, begun in 1921. Griffin and Marion moved from Melbourne to Castlecrag in 1924, and Marion took the role of a community leader at Castlecrag. By 1937, only nineteen houses, sixteen of them designed by Griffin, had been built on the 340 lots. The Glass House was one of three adjoining houses designed by Lucas.

The Glass House was designed by Sydney architects Ruth and Bill Lucas as a home for him to share with his wife and their children and was also to be used as a studio for their architectural practice and completed in 1957. Lucas' design projects included educational centres, an Aboriginal women's refuge, and furniture and theatre sets. The family moved to Paddington in the early 1960s and joined the campaign to help save the area from slum clearance. Bill Lucas worked to develop architectural processes and prototypes. He was a member of the loose association of architects that is now known as the Sydney School.

=== Recognitions ===
Docomomo International recognises the Glass House as a seminal example of the "shelter-in-nature" minimalist compositions constructed in northern Sydney post World War II. William J. R. Curtis, author of Modern Architecture since 1900, singles out the Glass House as a remarkable example of an Australian adaptation of modernist principles, being "so understated that it virtually disappeared into its wooded setting". The Glass House was also listed on the New South Wales State Heritage Register on 21 October 2016.

== Description ==
The Glass House is a single-storey residence built over a steeply sloping bush site. One corner of the house barely touches the natural sandstone outcrops. The rest of the building and the decks are suspended over vegetation and rock outcrops. The rectangular plan is divided up into a grid of 1.1 square metres (12 square feet). A timber framework is braced with steel cross-bracing: four slender steel posts are the main structural elements, forming the corners of the lightwell. Entry is from a path beside the carport. Visitors enter straight into the first living room, which was used by Bill and Ruth Lucas for meetings with clients. A wall separates this area from the kitchen and a larger portion of the living/dining room. The living room and kitchen are glazed, opening onto the front deck and the internal deck and light well.

The original construction is described in an article in Architecture in Australia, October–December 1957. The house is suspended on four 7.6-centimetre (3.0 in) square columns. All the timbers are rough-sawn creosoted hardwood inside and out. Wall timbers are restricted to mullions and posts at 1.2 metres (3.9 feet) centres and the roof framing to purlins at 1.2 metres (3.9 feet) centres on beams at 3.7 metres (12 feet) centres. The roofing was originally constructed with deep corrugated asbestos cement, having no roof battens. Safety mesh was stretched over the purlins and supported a 57-gram (2 oz) white fibre-glass blanket between clear Visqueen and double-sided sisalation.

=== Restoration ===
In 2002–2003, a remedial works program replaced all the foundation fittings and re-braced the house. Bracing was increased in some areas from 1/2" steel rods to 3/4" steel rods. The floor comprises 3.7 by 1.2 metres (12.1 by 3.9 ft) Stramit panels, being masonite-faced on hardwood joists at 0.61-metre (2.0-foot) centres. Stramit is also used for the internal walls.

A more extensive restoration was undertaken in 2023 under the custodianship of Cracknell and Lonergan Architects. The building work was undertaken by Bill and Ruth Lucas' son, Peter Lucas (with Esteban Carretero).

=== Architecture and heritage awards ===
The restoration undertaken in 2023 was awarded a NSW Heritage Architecture Award (Conservation) 2024 (awarded to Cracknell and Lonergan Architects) and a 2024 Built Heritage Award (Small Scale) at the NSW National Trust annual awards held in May. In June 2024 the house was awarded the New South Wales Enduring Architecture Award by the New South Wales Chapter of the Australian Institute of Architects (AIA). In November 2024 the Glasshouse restoration project was awarded the highest national architecture award for heritage, the 2024 Lachlan Macquarie Award for Heritage Architecture at the national AIA Awards.

== See also ==
- New South Wales Enduring Architecture Award
- Australian residential architectural styles
- Sydney School
