= Laurelbank =

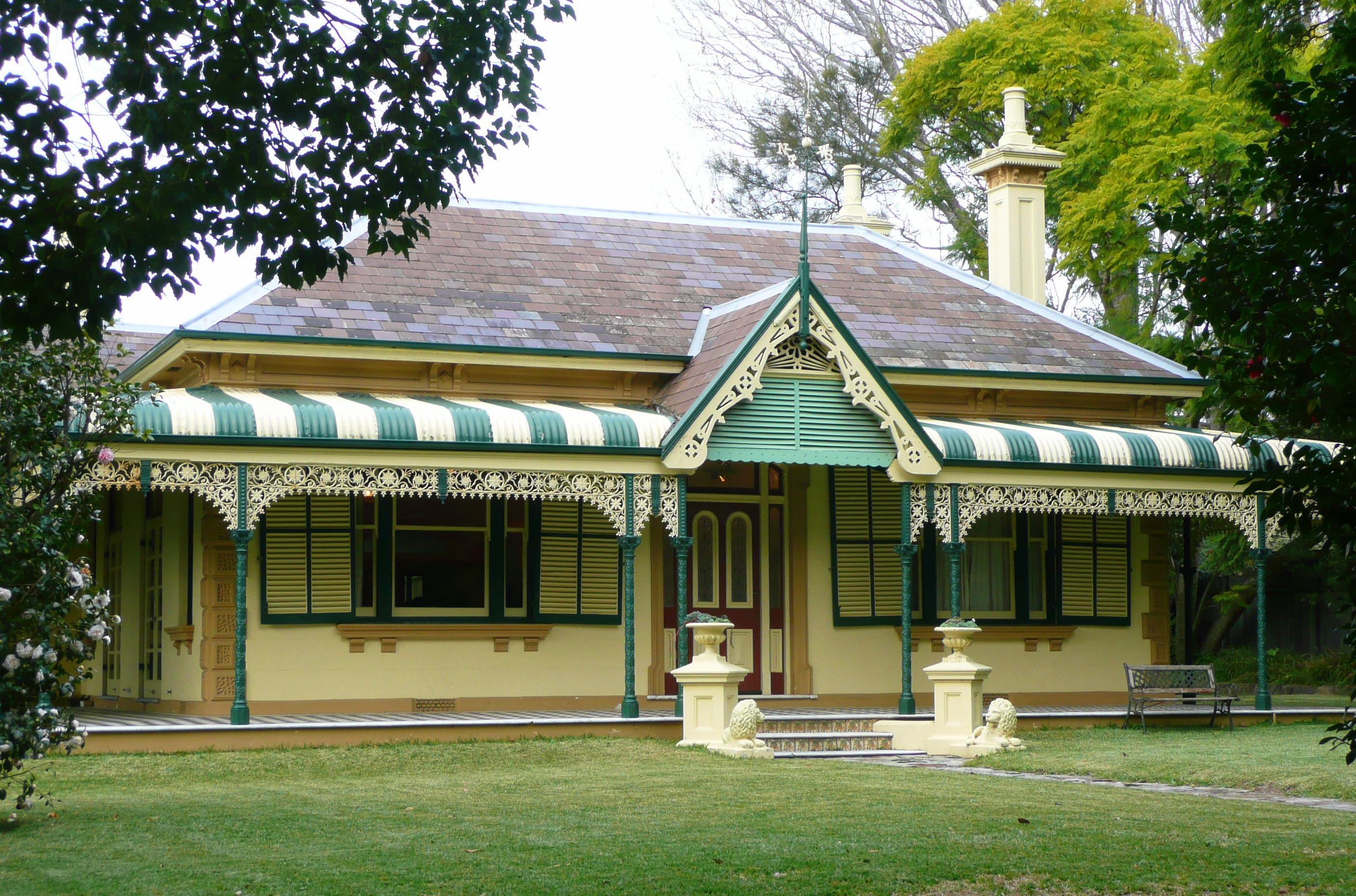
- Laurelbank, in June 2010

- Location within Sydney Location within Australia
- 33°48′03″S 151°11′57″E
- Location: 85–87 Penshurst Street, Willoughby, City of Willoughby, New South Wales, Australia

History
- Built: 1850–1884

Site notes
- Architectural style: Victorian Italianate
- Owner: Laurelbank Masonic Centre Pty Ltd

New South Wales Heritage Register
- Official name: Laurelbank
- Type: State heritage (complex / group)
- Designated: 2 April 1999
- Reference no.: 657
- Type: House
- Category: Residential buildings (private)

Laurelbank is a heritage-listed former residence and now function centre at 85–87 Penshurst Street, Willoughby, City of Willoughby, New South Wales, Australia. It was built from 1850 to 1884. The property is owned by the Laurelbank Masonic Centre Pty Ltd, a community group. It was added to the New South Wales State Heritage Register on 2 April 1999.

== History ==
=== Willoughby ===
There is much conjecture as to the origin of this suburb's name. Some historians claim it was after a parish of that title; others that Surveyor-General Sir Thomas Mitchell decided to commemorate Sir James Willoughby Gordon, under whom he had served in the (Iberian) Peninsular War and who was the quartermaster-general in England when the First Fleet sailed for Botany Bay.

The municipality of Willoughby was incorporated in 1865, when the area was still rural. An early Council concern was construction of roads and bridges. By the 1890s the population of the area had increased rapidly because of improvement in public transport, particularly when the North Shore railway line opened in 1890. The suburb was soon outstripped by Chatswood, however, as it was nearer the line and other new facilities.

=== Laurel Bank (Laurelbank) ===
Laurel Bank presently stands on just over zero point four zero hectares (one acre) of land, the remaining portion of the original grant of 240 hectares (600 acres) made to Archbold James Sterling in 1850. Mr William Lithgow, a former Auditor General for the State of New South Wales, acquired the site thereafter and in the mid 1800s (said to be 1854) Laurel Bank Cottage was built for Mr and Mrs Joseph Griffiths. It included the cottage, stables and market gardens.

Laurel Bank Cottage was acquired by Doctor and Mrs F. C. Florance in 1924. It was acquired from the Florances in 1964 by the Ku-ring-gai Lodge Pty Ltd (now Laurelbank Masonic Centre Pty Ltd) for the use of Masonic meetings.

== Description ==
=== Garden ===
Laurel Bank's Cottage is situated on a large flat site which retains much of the early garden and original picket fence to Penshurst Street. The garden has a number of significant original plantings including the bank of Laurel trees running down Laurel Street, Japanese maple (Acer palmatum), camellias (Camellia japonica cv.s), Magnolia sp. and Jacaranda (J. mimosifolia) trees. The original paving, edging and layout are still distinguishable through the overgrowth. Oleander (Nerium oleander cv.) shrubs and Mediterranean cypress (Cupressus sempervirens) line the front fence on Penshurst Road. This fence is sandstone base with cast iron palisade pickets.

=== House ===
Laurel Bank is a single storey Victorian cottage in the Italianate style. Most of the original external features of the building are still intact. A large verandah with cast-iron columns and intricately decorated cast-iron valances extends laid out in a fine bordered chequerboard pattern. The entrance doorway and surrounding fan lights and side-lights are emphasised by a gable feature which carried over the bullnose verandah roof, and is framed by twin decorated columns. The verandah gable is decorated with an ornate timber barge.

Externally the building is finished in cement render and has extensive Italianate detailing. It has retained its original slate roof and is generally in good condition. The interior has been almost completely altered in the 1960s to permit its use as a meeting and function venue. Original skirting boards, most original windows and some original doors still exist. A false ceiling has been added, the original possibly existing above.

=== Stables ===
The original stables exist at the rear of the house. This is a two-storey rendered brick building with original windows and one original timber hayloft door with details matching that of the Laurel Bank Cottage.

=== Condition ===
Site retains much of the early garden and original iron picket fence. The garden has a number of significant original plantings including a Japanese maple (Acer palmatum), camellias (Camellia japonica cv.s), Magnolia sp. and jacaranda (J.mimosifolia) trees. The original paving, edging and layout are still distinguishable through the overgrowth.

=== House ===
Most of the original external features of the building are still intact. Its original slate roof is generally in good condition. The interior has been almost completely altered in the 1960s to permit its use as a meeting and function venue. Original skirting boards, most original windows and some original doors still exist. A false ceiling has been added, the original possibly existing above.

=== Stables ===
The original stables exist at the rear of the house (RNI).

=== Modifications and dates ===
1993 internal modifications for change of use.

== Heritage listing ==
Laurel Bank cottage was listed on the New South Wales State Heritage Register on 2 April 1999.

== See also ==
- Australian residential architectural styles
