= Fishwick House =

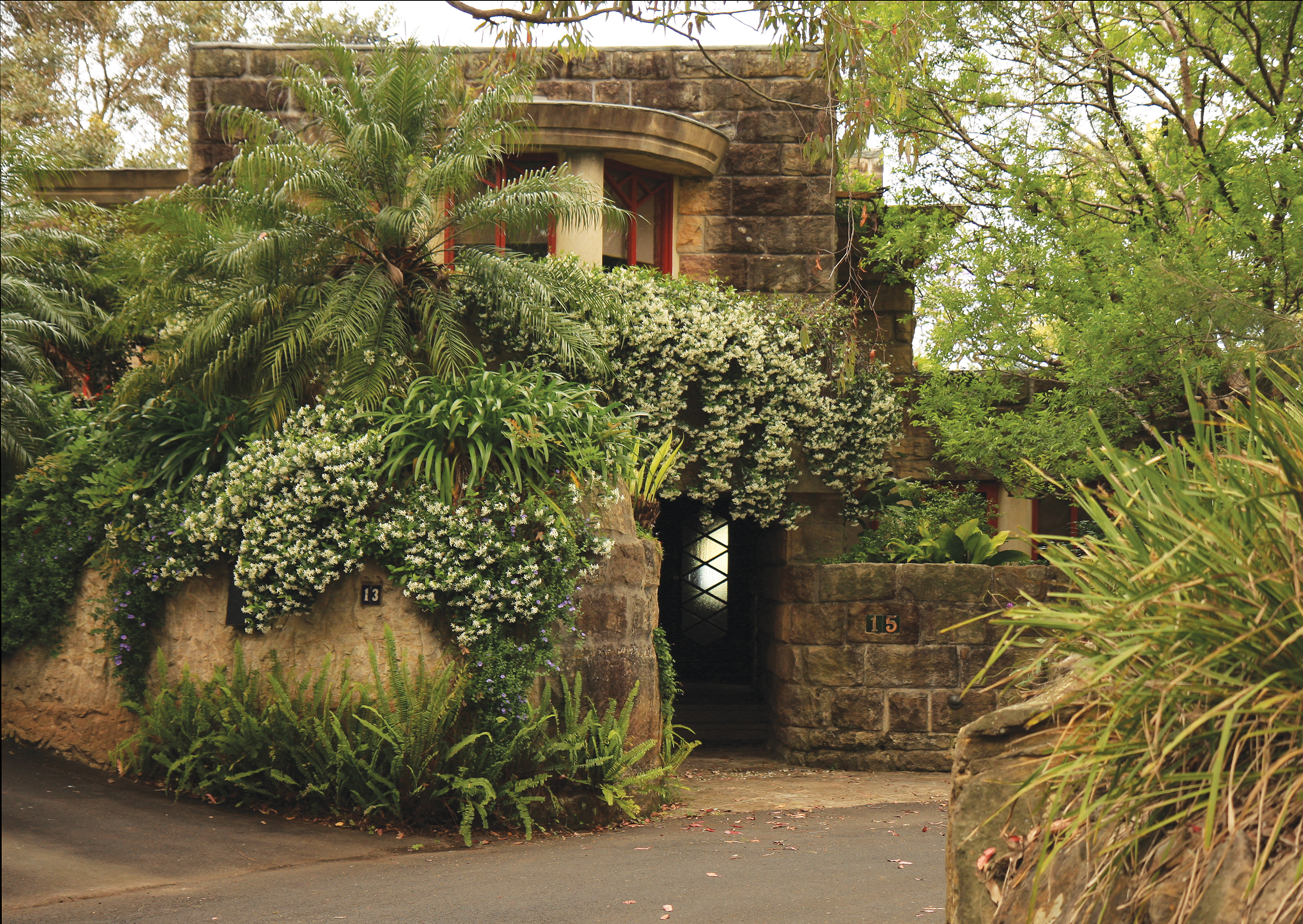
- Front section of house cutting deeply into native sandstone, 2009

- Location within Sydney Location within Australia
- 33°48′03″S 151°13′15″E
- Location: 15 The Citadel, Castlecrag, City of Willoughby, New South Wales, Australia

History
- Built: 1929

Site notes
- Architects: Walter Burley Griffin; Marion Mahony Griffin

New South Wales Heritage Register
- Official name: Fishwick House, The; Fyshwick House
- Type: State heritage (built)
- Designated: 15 December 2006
- Reference no.: 1751
- Type: House
- Category: Residential buildings (private)

The Fishwick House is a heritage-listed private residence located at 15 The Citadel, Castlecrag, New South Wales, a suburb of Sydney, Australia. It was designed by Walter Burley Griffin and Marion Mahony Griffin and built during 1929. It is also known as The Fishwick House and Fyshwick House. The property is privately owned. It was added to the New South Wales State Heritage Register on 15 December 2006.

== History ==
=== Walter Burley Griffin (1876-1937) ===
Walter Burley Griffin was born near Chicago and trained at Nathan Ricker's School of Architecture at the University of Illinois, graduating in 1899. From 1901-1906, he worked as an associate of Frank Lloyd Wright at Oak Park. Griffin started his own practice in 1906 and within a few years established his reputation as an architect of the Prairie School. In 1911, Griffin married Marion Mahony, who had graduated in architecture from the Massachusetts Institute of Technology and worked as Wright's head designer.

Inspired by the designs by Frederick Law Olmsted (often called the founder of American landscape architecture) of New York's Central Park and his "green necklace" of parks in Boston, landscape design was the career Walter Burley Griffin would have pursued had the opportunity offered. He had approached Chicago landscape gardener Ossian Cole Simonds for career advice before entering the University of Illinois in 1895. Apparently unsatisfied with the lack of relevant curriculum, Simonds urged him to pursue architecture and study landscape gardening on his own, as he himself had done. Griffin took what classes he could and, like Simonds and landscape gardener Jens Jensen, shared an approach to landscape design through architecture, an interest in civic design, urbanism and planning.

In 1902 there were only six "landscape gardeners" (and no landscape architects) listed in the Lakeside Annual Directory of the City of Chicago. In 1912 only two landscape architects and 13 landscape gardeners were listed.

Griffin's practice as a landscape architect was first featured in a public text in Wilhelm Miller's "The Prairie Spirit in Landscape Gardening" (1915), which included Griffin as an exponent (along with Jensen, Simonds and architect Frank Lloyd Wright) of his proposed American regional "Prairie" style. Simonds, Griffin and Miller had all attended the first national meeting of the American Society of Landscape Architects (ASLA) in 1913 in Chicago.

By 1914 Griffin and his architect wife Marion Mahony had moved to Australia after winning the 1912 international design competition for the Federal Capital, Canberra with a scheme based on its topography, a distinctly non-prairie valley landscape of undulating hills. This was a project they had worked on together.

=== The Griffins' in Sydney and design legacy ===
By 1919, there were problems with the Canberra project and Griffin resigned his position as Federal Capital Director of Design and Construction. He then formed the Greater Sydney Development Association to purchase 263 hectares in Middle Harbour, which became known as Castlecrag. He devoted the next fifteen years to developing and promoting the area, while maintaining an architectural practice.

Griffin believed dwellings should play a subordinate role in the scheme of nature. His houses were small and intimate. He aimed toward the most natural use of land and the selection of indigenous plants. He also developed an economical construction system of pre-cast interlocking structural tiles, which he called "Knitlock", and used it widely, as well as stone, in the houses of Castlecrag. In the early 1930s, Griffin built incinerators for the destruction of household garbage in various cities and suburbs in the eastern states of Australia. They provided a canvas for experimentation with form and texture for the architect, but sadly few have survived.

Two Griffin incinerators survive in suburban Sydney: the Glebe Municipal Incinerator (City of Sydney Local Environmental Plan 2000 local heritage item); and the Willoughby Incinerator.

Griffin's work took him to India in 1935 and he died there two years later of peritonitis.

Griffin's contribution to the development of the Wrightian / Prairie School style internationally has begun to receive attention from architectural historians in recent years. It is now increasingly acknowledged that Griffin contributed a number of fresh concepts to the Prairie School, most noticeably: his attention to vertical space (a development leading directly to the ubiquitous split-level style post-war houses); "open plan" living and dining areas dominated by a large central fireplace; and the extensive domestic use of reinforced concrete.

Griffin is also internationally renowned for his work as a landscape architect, especially the innovative town planning design of Canberra and Castlecrag, Griffith and Leeton.

Griffin's design approaches to landscape and architecture informed one another. Landscape itself, for example, crucially served as a basis for architecture - a conviction first made explicit in the Canberra publicity, Griffin noting (in Chicago) that: "...a building should ideally be "the logical outgrowth of the environment in which [it is] located"." In Australia, he hoped to "evolve an indigenous type, one similarly derived from and adapted to local climate, climate and topography." In Australia the scale and number of his landscape commissions grew considerably, including a number of town plans. Griffin signed many of his drawings with the term "landscape architect".

Walter Burley Griffin and Marion Mahony Griffin had both worked in the office of the American Architect, Frank Lloyd Wright, where they gained an appreciation of the principles of organic architecture. Walter Burley Griffin arrived in Australia in 1913 to supervise construction of his winning design for the new Federal Capital at Canberra, his involvement with this project was over by 1918.

=== The Griffins' involvement in Castlecrag ===
In 1919, the Griffins established the Greater Sydney Development Association (GSDA) and purchased 650 acres of land at Castlecrag for the sum of 25,000 pounds with the aim of developing the site as an exclusive harbour front residential enclave. The land was subdivided and some allotments sold at public auction. Marion Mahony Griffin privately sought owners for other allotments. The GSDA placed a covenant on the sale of sites in Castlecrag to ensure a consistency of architecture.

Walter Burley Griffin designed over 40 speculative houses for Castlecrag, the majority being large and lavishly finished to cater for the intended affluent clients. Only 14 residences were completed of which 13 remain. Of these, only the Fishwick house and Felstead house were built to the scale and budget, which allowed Griffin to fully, develop many of his design ideas.

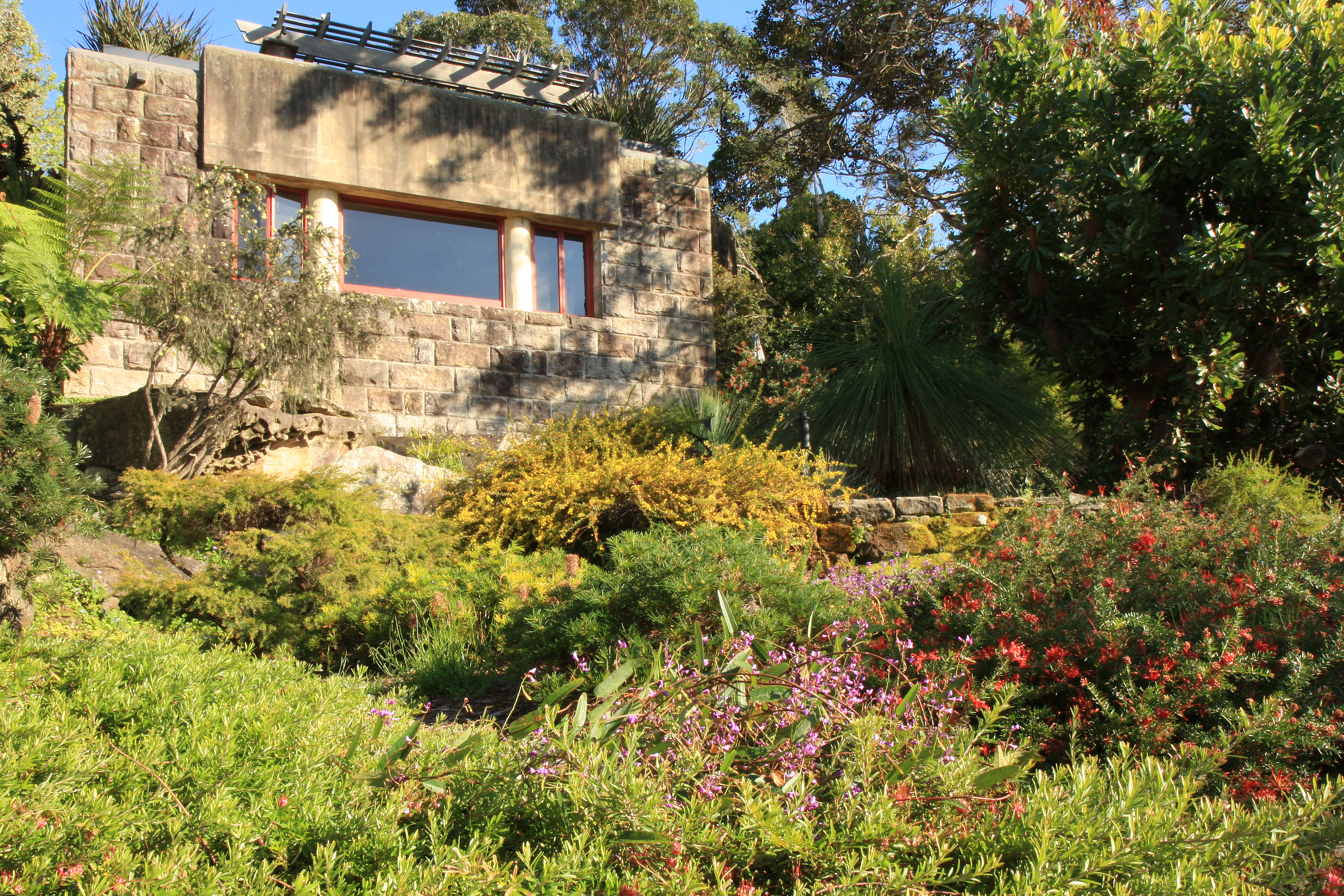
Rear of house overlooking native garden and Griffin-designed bushland reserves

By late 1922, the initial flurry of construction in Castlecrag was over. Griffin had by then designed and completed half the projects he was to build on the Estate and these were all either demonstration houses or speculatively built. His success in attracting private clients deteriorated markedly during the 1920s.

=== The Fishwick house ===
In 1929, when the Fishwick house was built, it had been three years since he had received a commission in Castlecrag. Only one small house, the Duncan house, was built in Castlecrag during the 1930s, it was completed in 1934, the year before Griffin left Australia for India. Thus, the Fishwick house was his last major project in Castlecrag.

The land at 15 The Citadel, Castlecrag was purchased in 1927 by Mrs Elizabeth Bell for 450 pounds. Mrs Bell sold the land in 1929 to Mr Thomas Wilson Fishwick, the Australian representative of Fowlers, a Leeds-based road making equipment manufacturing firm. Thomas Fishwick was interested in technology and innovation. He proved to be a client who not only had a very large budget but was also open to new ideas. In 1929, he commissioned Griffin to design a house and the Fishwick house was completed later that year at a cost of 3,000 pounds. Fishwick lived in the house with his wife until 1931.

From 1931 to 1940, Nisson Leonard Kanewsky, a Russian immigrant, rented the residence. Walter Burley Griffin designed the Leonard building in Melbourne for Kanewsky, and together they developed twelve Reverbatory Incinerators particularly for Melbourne and Sydney councils. Two of these incinerators survive in suburban Sydney: the Glebe Municipal Incinerator (City of Sydney Local Environmental Plan 2000 local heritage item) and the Willoughby Incinerator.

The Fishwick house was then rented by Nancy and Rawson Deans who later purchased the house in 1945 for 1,450 pounds.

In 1976, Andrew and Susan Kirk, the present owners, purchased the Fishwick house for $98,000. During the 1970s and 1980s, a major works program was undertaken to restore the fabric of the property, including the rebuilding of the kitchen, replacement of the bituminous and pebble roof membrane, underpinning of the north-east corner, repair of concrete spalling to internal walls, and upgrading of water, gas, sewage, stormwater and electrical services. A further restoration program was completed in 1998 under the supervision of conservation architects, including restoration of interior finishes, interior conservation and repair work. A program of landscape works was also undertaken.

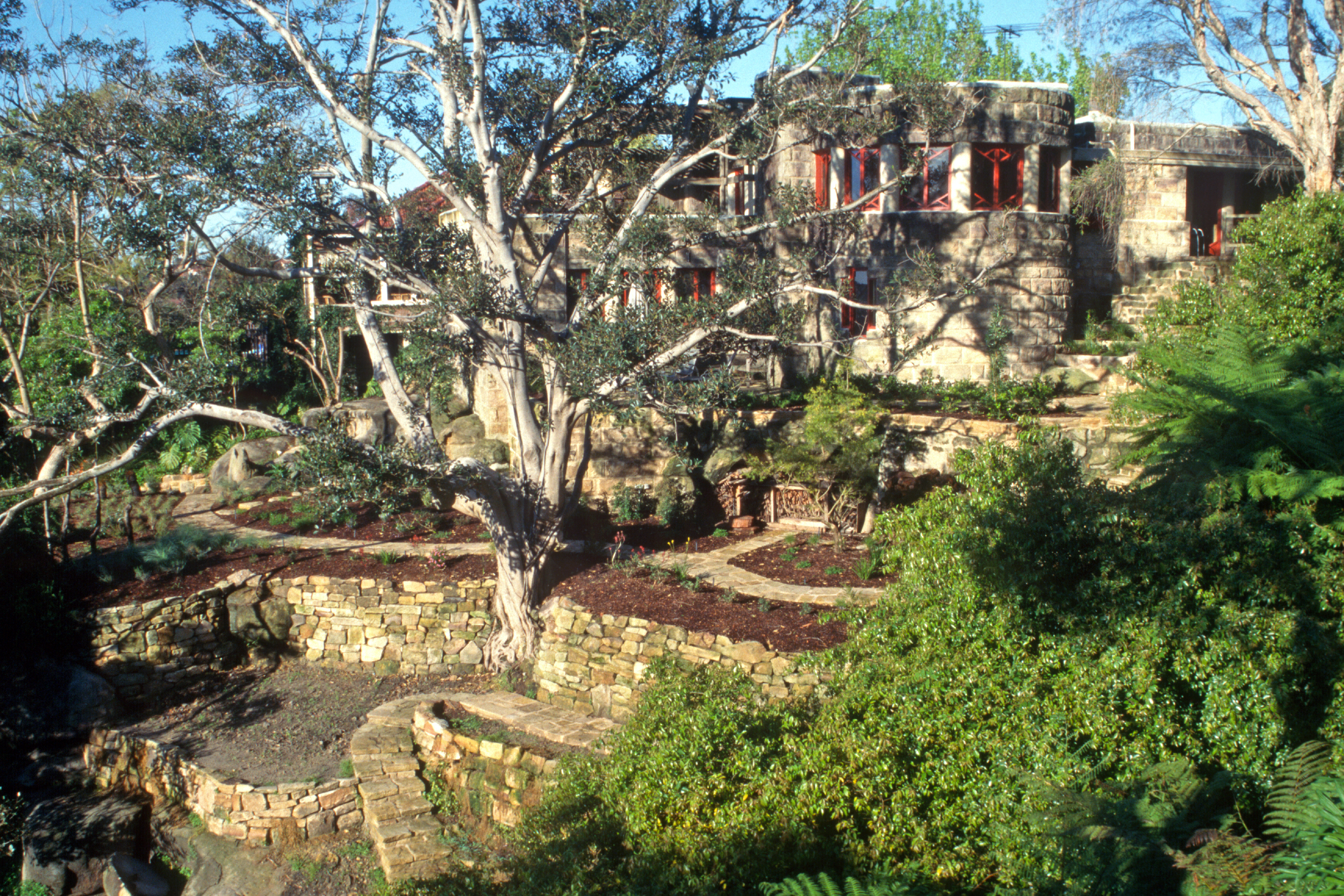
House and terraced native garden after mid-1990s restoration

The Fishwick house has been described in one of the most authoritative text on Castlecrag as "the most celebrated of the Griffin houses in Castlecrag". In a number of important respects, it demonstrates the culmination of the development of Griffin's design and landscaping ideas in Australia.

== Description ==
Castlecrag, a promontory jutting out into Sydney's Middle Harbour provided a dramatic and beautiful setting for Walter Burley & Marion Mahony Griffins' design ideas and philosophy for housing and estate development. The Castlecrag estate expressed their views on community planning and the integration of community, nature and the built environment. Roads follow the contours of the land and a system of public pathways runs between the road from ridge to waterline, allowing the view and nature of all sites to be accessible to the community.

The Fishwick House is located at the end of The Citadel cul-de-sac, and below the Tower Reserve. The land is irregular in shape and falls steeply from the west to the east. To the west is the house which sits on what appears to be a large rock. To the east dry stone walls have been used to terrace the site. The house was designed by Walter Burley Griffin and constructed in 1929, designed to sit in harmony with the natural surroundings. It is large and lavish compared to the other Castlecrag houses. It is a two-storey dwelling, with a west-east axis from The Citadel to the harbour and ocean. The siting and design take advantage of extensive views of bushland, Middle Harbour and the distant ocean.

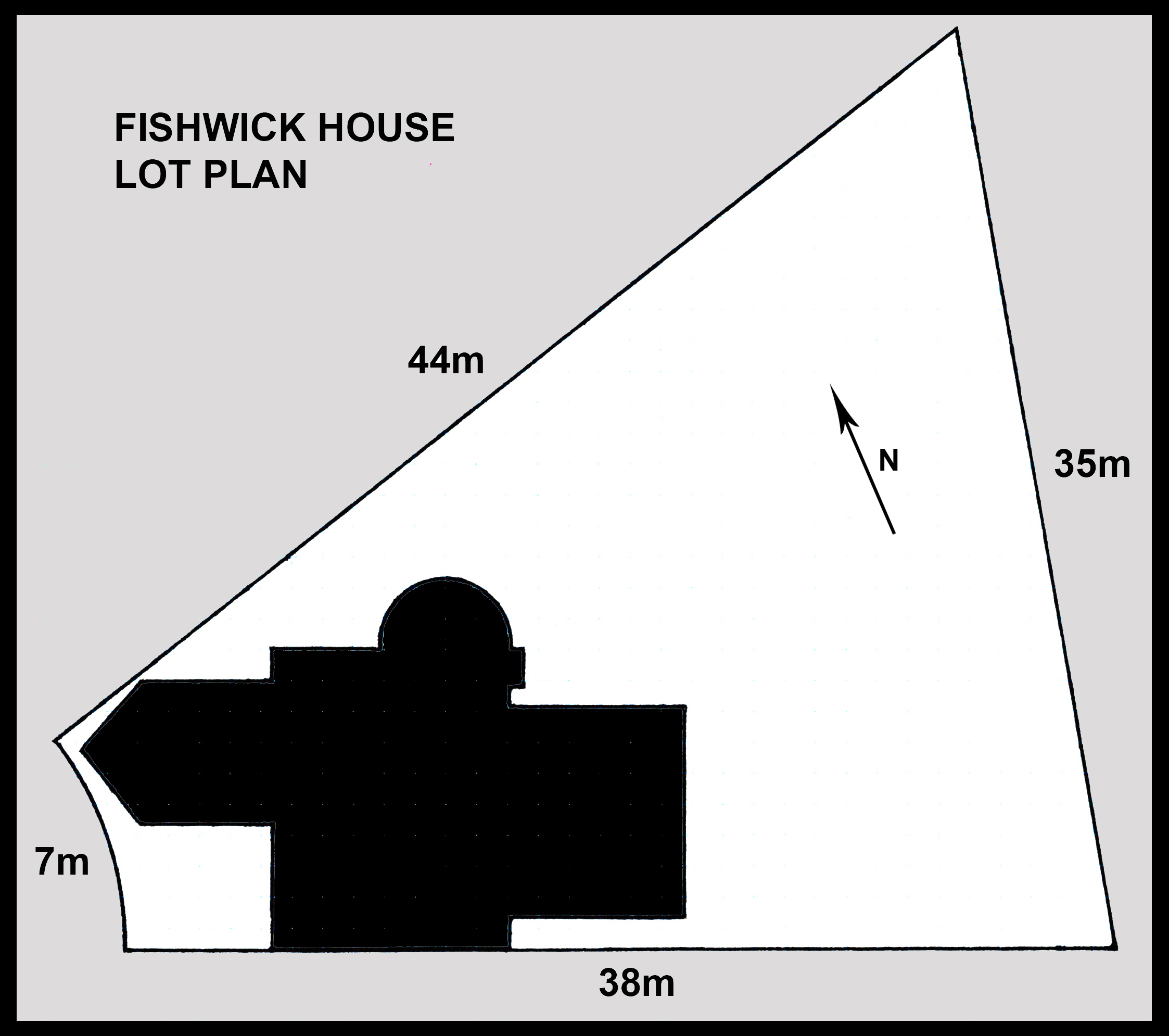
Front of house tightly positioned on cul-de-sac

The house is primarily constructed of sandstone quarried on-site and nearby. Rock-faced stone has been used for external walling, giving the appearance that the house "rises" out of the rock on which it is built. Face-sandstone has also been used for internal walls, fireplaces and chimneys. The floors are timber with the exception of the upstairs corridor, work room, bedroom 3 and the bathrooms that are of concrete hollow block construction.

The house is asymmetrical, incorporating split floor levels in stark contrast to the simple rectangular forms of most of Griffin's Castlecrag work. The split level design produces strong external geometry manifested as a series of stepped forms with horizontal planes, reflecting the contours of the site. Living areas are located on the ground floor, with bedroom and private areas on the first floor. A roof terrace is situated over the eastern portion of the building, with a second terrace accessed by a centrally located stair. The entry to the house is via a series of connecting spaces, progressing from the claustrophobic, tunnel like front passage into the entrance hall and finally the lounge, each time the ceiling height increases to provide a sense of journey. The entrance hall is flanked by circular columns, decorated extensively with gold leaf, the columns are in fact drainage pipes.

A sand, cement and bitumen mixture has been applied to the sub-floor as infill between floor joists to minimise rising damp, to act as a termite deterrent and to serve as insulation. Translucent amber glazing has been used to provide a warm, sunlight effect to introverted spaces.

The ground floor has a lounge, dining room, study, kitchen, entrance hall, large front entrance hall and built-in garage. The first floor consists of two bedrooms, two bathrooms (one en-suite), the former maid's quarters with its own entrance (now a third bedroom and workroom). There are four outdoor seating areas, each with a different aspect to the weather.

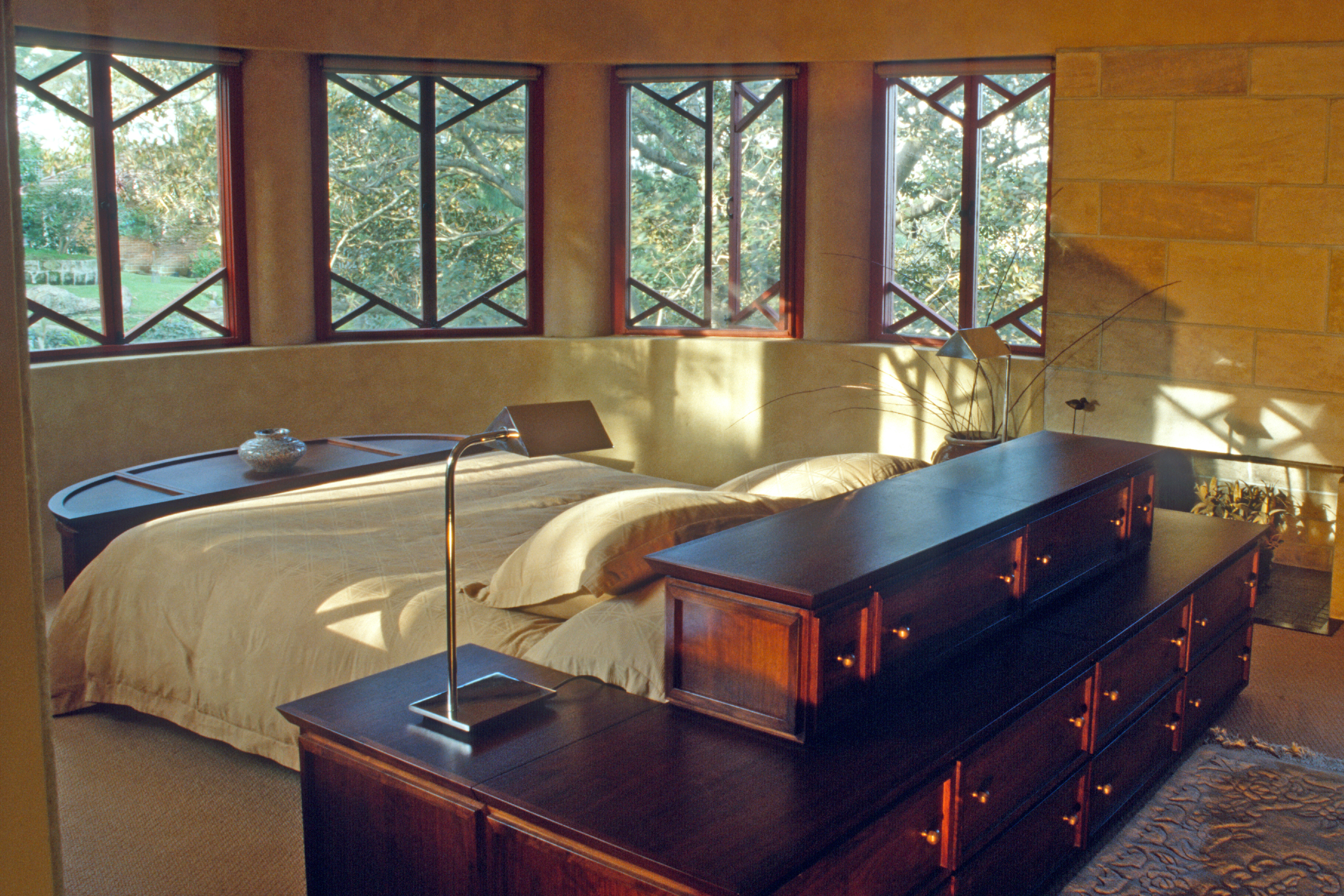
Semi-circular main bedroom - note sandstone fireplace

Thomas Fishwick was a client who was technically minded and progressive in his attitudes, allowing Griffin the opportunity to design into the house numerous modern amenities, innovative design ideas and artistic effects which are unique amongst the Castlecrag houses. Griffin was able to develop technical concepts on a larger scale in this house than in other houses in Castlecrag. Design inclusions considered modern for the time were: the large built in garage with 6 panel, articulated, glass sliding door suspended from a curved rail; a large picture window 2.0m x 1.25m overlooking Middle Harbour; built-in wardrobes; sunken bath and en-suite to the main bedroom; concealment of plumbing to the upstairs toilets above the upper ceiling level and recessing their flush pipes in wall cavities (since removed); cork floors in both bathrooms; a large waterproofed planter box; and indirect lighting.

Creative design innovations included: 2 fish ponds with glass bottoms hung from the ceiling (replaced by sky lights in the 1930s); 2 flues are used for the main fireplace drawing from the sides, rather than from above, allowing for a window above the fireplace; complex window design for the study; and an unusual designed protruding frame for a window and mirror to the en-suite.

The Griffins also used a variety of decorative and textured finishes, mirrored glass, shaped wood and ceramics to create special effects, some having strong symbolic qualities. Of note are the 25 tall mirrored amber glass panels in the entrance; the use of 60-degree angles to produce diamond or crystalline shapes; attention to decorative finishes particularly to the pillars; a row of colourful ceramic tiles in the moulded fireplace (unique amongst the Castlecrag houses); the entirely moulded concrete fireplace in the work room, a "prow" design integrated with the pattern of coloured glass tiles in the hearth.

The site was landscaped with dry stone walls, sandstone steps, large natural rock escarpments and dramatic sandstone boulders. The garden had become overgrown over the years and a major re-landscaping was undertaken in 1998. The work removed extensive weed infestations, restored dry stone walls and steps and added additional pathways, a pond, paved area, walls and plantings

=== Condition ===
As at 26 May 2005, the exterior and interior of the house is in excellent condition, and retains much of the original fabric and design integrity.

The Fishwick house is remarkably intact and retains much of its original fabric. The house and setting retains its original design integrity.

=== Further information ===
$24,597 funding for restoration work to its roof (2004/5 CHHP Federal funding)

== Heritage listing ==
As at 3 January 2007, the Fishwick house is of State significance as a remarkably intact, representative example of the domestic architecture of Walter Burley Griffin which retains the integrity of its original architectural layout, design and decorative detailing. It is also a rarity as it is one of 13 remaining Griffin-designed houses in the Griffins' (Walter Burley & Marion Mahony Griffin) Castlecrag Estate and one of two of these houses that was built to the scale and level of design detail consistent with its original design.

The design, construction and detailing of the Fishwick house demonstrates Griffin's commitment to combining creativity and artistry with innovative uses of technology and materials. The house and its landscape setting, located in the Griffins' Castlecrag Estate, are valuable research resources for the study of the Griffins' work and the philosophy underpinning Walter's design innovations. The house has social significance at a local level as a gathering place for the local community. It was at the Fishwick house that the Community Circle met, a community group formed by Marion Mahony, the architect wife of Walter Burley Griffin. It was also the venue for a long-standing community cooperative formed to fundraise for community facilities such as the local kindergarten and community centre.

Fishwick House was listed on the New South Wales State Heritage Register on 15 December 2006 having satisfied the following criteria.

The place is important in demonstrating the course, or pattern, of cultural or natural history in New South Wales.

The Fishwick house is historically significant at a State level as it is a fine and intact example of the innovative and distinctive work of Walter Burley Griffin an architect who made a significant contribution to the development of Australian architectural design. The Fishwick house is also historically significant as being part of Griffin's Castlecrag urban development which was a distinctive regional development to be planned and designed to harmonise with and enhance existing natural landscape qualities and targeted for sale at a particular market. The Fishwick house is important as one of only two houses built to the scale level of design detail consistent with the Griffin's original design

The place has a strong or special association with a person, or group of persons, of importance of cultural or natural history of New South Wales's history.

The Fishwick house is of State significance through its association with the work of architect Walter Burley.

The place is important in demonstrating aesthetic characteristics and/or a high degree of creative or technical achievement in New South Wales.

The Fishwick house is aesthetically significant at a State level as its form, massing and architectural and decorative detail demonstrates the distinctive style developed by Griffin and is an excellent example of innovative architecture developed during the inter-war period. The Fishwick house is a fine example of the artistry and architectural achievements of Griffin. The attention to siting and insistence that the building harmonise with and enhance the natural landscape make it a clear example of the design philosophy developed by Griffin.

Designed as it was without limitations of budget it demonstrates Griffin's commitment to combining creativity and technological and materials innovation. This is demonstrated in; the 6 panel articulated glass sliding garage doors, the large picture window in the lounge room raised into specially constructed recess with counterweights inside two flanking concrete pillars, the use of cork flooring in bathrooms, the use of sand cement and bitumen sub-floor infill in the ground floor to achieve damp control, temperature insulation and termite proofing. and the use of hollow block concrete slab construction in the upper floors. These are only a few of the innovative creative and technological features of the home.

The place has strong or special association with a particular community or cultural group in New South Wales for social, cultural or spiritual reasons.

The Fishwick house has social significance at a local level as a place which for many years became a centrepoint or gathering place for the local community. During the 1940s and 1950s the house was used for gatherings of the "Community Circle" a community group formed by Marion Mahony Griffin years earlier. It was also where a local community cooperative met to organise fundraising to build the local kindergarten and community centre.

The place has potential to yield information that will contribute to an understanding of the cultural or natural history of New South Wales.

The Fishwick house is of State significance as an important demonstration of Griffin's architectural style and innovative design a features, technical features and materials. The house in its garden setting is also a striking example of the philosophy underpinning Griffin's architectural style, a style that valued and worked in sympathy with the natural landscape.

The place possesses uncommon, rare or endangered aspects of the cultural or natural history of New South Wales.

The Fishwick house is of State significance for its rarity as one of 13 surviving designed by Walter Burley Griffin in Castlecrag. Its rarity is further enhanced by the fact that it is one of only two of Griffin's houses in Castlecrag built to the large scale level and high quality of design detail consistent with his concept of the estate as a "high-class residential area". It is the estate's only house of two storeys and it by far its largest and grandest.

The place is important in demonstrating the principal characteristics of a class of cultural or natural places/environments in New South Wales.

The Fishwick house is representative of the work of Walter Burley Griffin.

== See also ==
- Australian residential architectural styles
