= Castle Cove, New South Wales =

Castle Cove
- Suburb
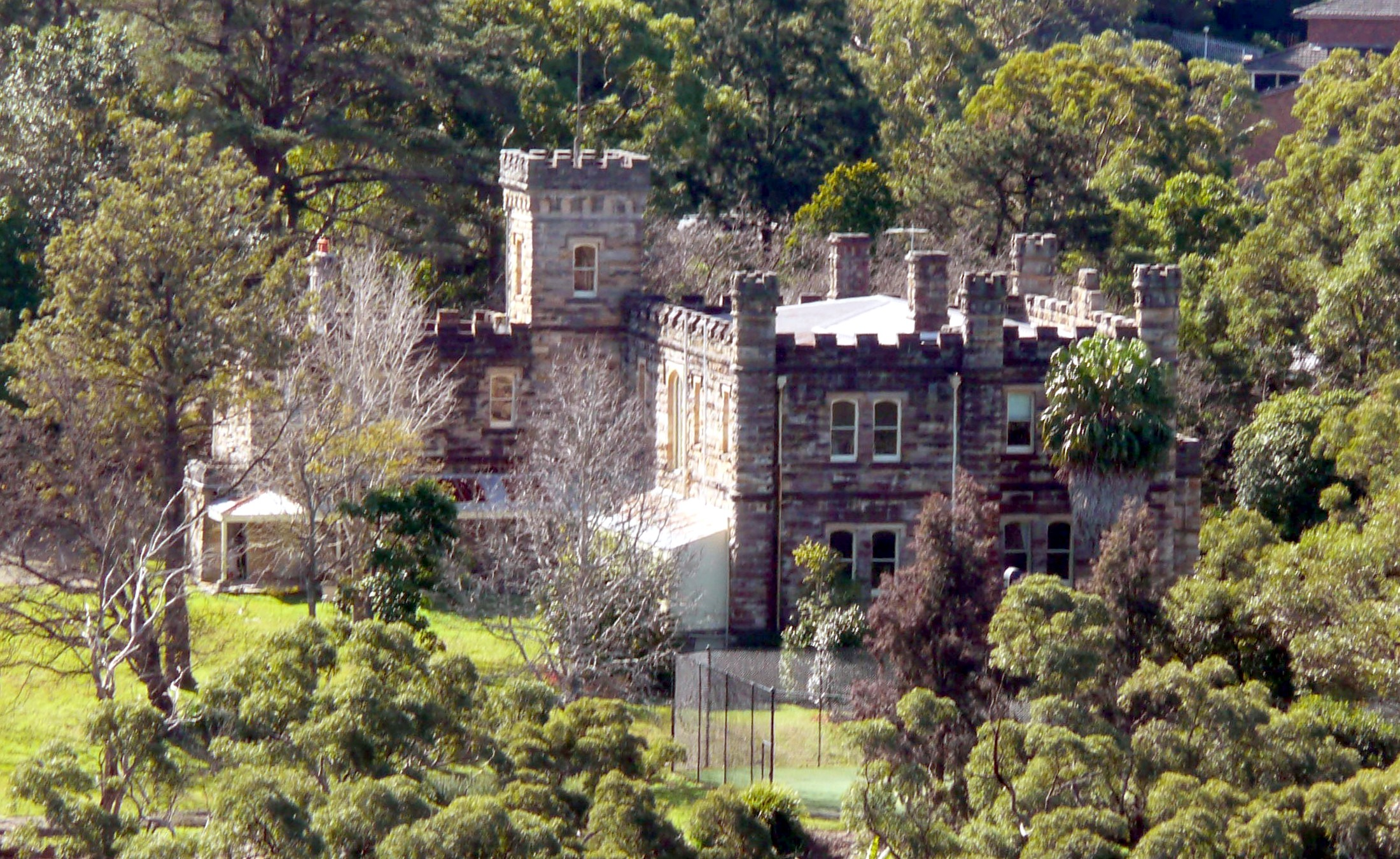
- Innisfallen Castle as seen from Middle Cove

- Interactive map of Castle Cove
- Country: Australia
- State: New South Wales
- City: Sydney
- LGA: City of Willoughby
- Location: 11 km (6.8 mi) from Sydney CBD
- Established: 1858

Government
  - State electorate: Willoughby
  - Federal division: Bradfield

Area
  - Total: 2.3 km^{2} (0.89 sq mi)
- Elevation: 67 m (220 ft)

Population
  - Total: 2,643 (2021 census)
  - Density: 1,149/km^{2} (2,980/sq mi)
- Postcode: 2069
Suburbs around Castle Cove
Roseville	Roseville Chase	Killarney Heights
Chatswood	Castle Cove	Seaforth
North Willoughby	Middle Cove	Castlecrag

Willoughby Municipality

Castle Cove is a suburb on the lower North Shore of Sydney, in the state of New South Wales, Australia. Castle Cove is located 11 km (6.8 mi) north of the Sydney central business district, in the local government area of the City of Willoughby. Castle Cove is situated on the western side of Middle Harbour.

== History ==
The Cammeraygal people of the Guringai nation lived in the area until the 1820s and are recorded as being in the northern parts of the Sydney region for approximately 5,800 years.

It is believed that Castle Cove was named after the estate of Henry Hastings Willis, a prominent member of the Parliament of New South Wales at the time.

In 1858 the first grant purchase was made to Dr H. G. Alleyne. By 1878 almost all the land on the peninsula had been sold. In 1886 most of the area had been resold to Andrew Armstrong who formed the Cammeray Estate Land Company, which went into liquidation in 1893. In 1903-04 the Willis family built "Innisfallen Castle", a grand, castle-like house. They had purchased 21 hectares (52 acres) from Dr Alleyne on a default mortgage and used the land for light farming.

In 1958 the Hooker Corporation acquired a controlling interest in Walter Burley Griffin's company, The Greater Sydney Development Association, which had owned most of Castlecrag, Middle Harbour and Castle Cove. From 1956 to 1970 Castle Cove was developed by Headland Developments and Hooker-Rex Estates.

Around 1985, the descendants of Henry Willis attempted to subdivide the land around the Castle, to be used for construction of several town houses, and turn the Castle into a wedding reception centre. As the land earmarked for the town houses was previously donated to the Castle owners by the government to enhance the Castle grounds, it was felt that profiting from this was inappropriate. As a result, Willoughby Council rejected the rezoning required to build the townhouses. Permission to run a business from the Castle was also rejected. The Castle owners then sold the property for approx $4 million, via an onsite public auction.

== Heritage listings ==
Castle Cove has a number of heritage-listed sites, including Innisfallen Castle and grounds, 14 Cherry Place.

== Population ==
Historical population
Year	Pop.	±%
2001	2,323	—
2006	2,381	+2.5%
2011	2,523	+6.0%
2016	2,554	+1.2%
2021	2,643	+3.5%

According to the 2021 census, there were 2,643 residents in Castle Cove. 60.0% of people were born in Australia. The next most common countries of birth were China (without SARs and Taiwan) 7.3%, England 4.7%, Hong Kong 4.1%, United States 1.4% and New Zealand 1.4%. 67.7% of people spoke only English at home. Other languages spoken at home included Cantonese 8.7% and Mandarin 7.9%. The most common responses for religion were No Religion 37.7%, Catholic 23.9% and Anglican 14.3%.

== Education ==
Castle Cove Public School is a co-educational public school. It accommodates students from years Kindergarten to 6.

== Transport ==
Castle Cove is served by the 277 bus route from Chatswood. It is operated by CDC NSW.
