= Innisfallen Castle and grounds =

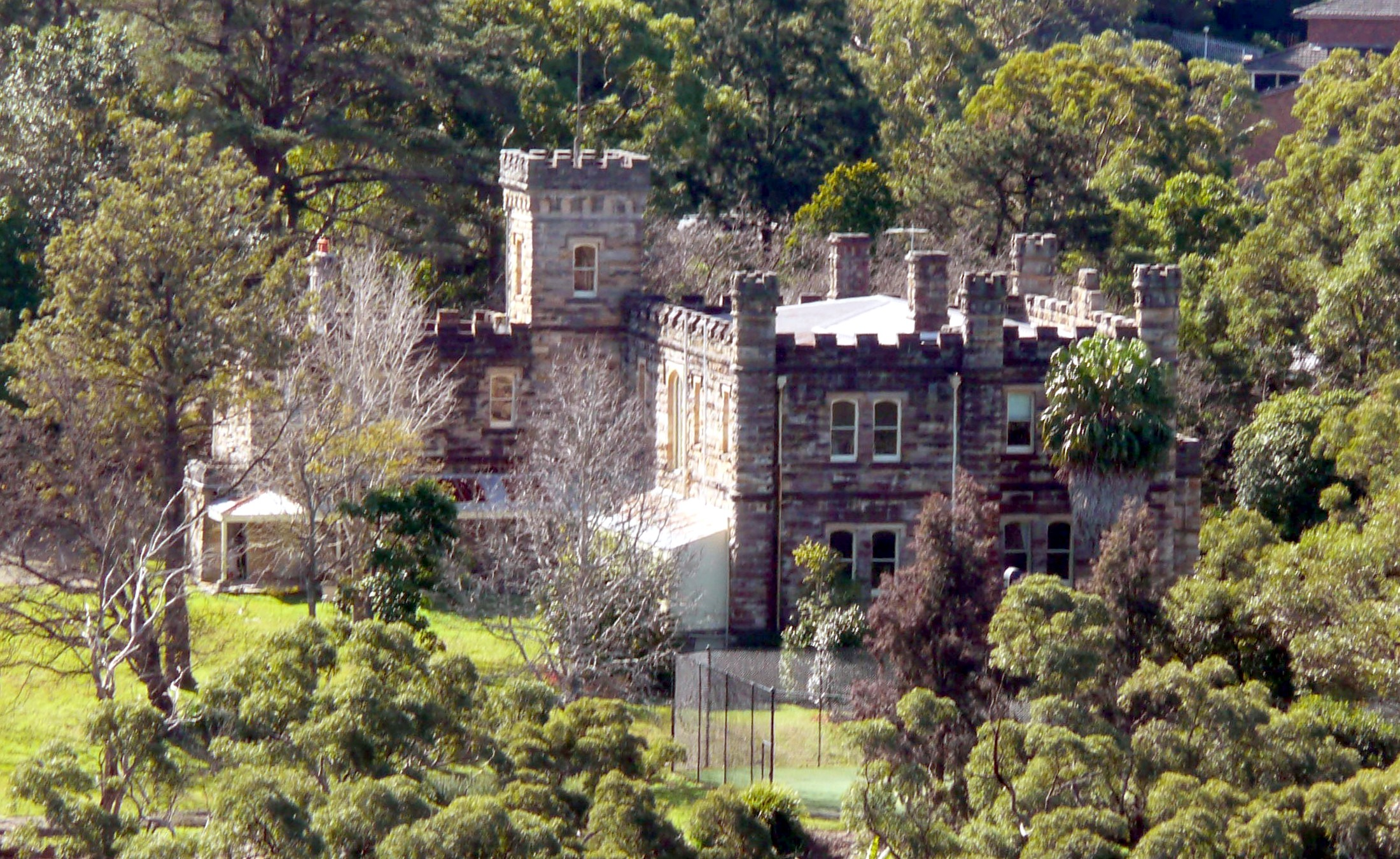

- Innisfallen Castle and grounds, pictured in 2010 Innisfallen Castle and grounds (Australia)
- 33°47′29″S 151°13′25″E
- Location: 14 Cherry Place, Castle Cove, City of Willoughby, New South Wales, Australia

History
- Built: 1903 – 1905
- Built for: Henry Hastings Willis

New South Wales Heritage Register
- Official name: Innisfallen Castle and Grounds
- Type: State heritage (built)
- Designated: 2 April 1999
- Reference no.: 404
- Type: Mansion
- Category: Residential buildings (private)

Innisfallen Castle and grounds is a heritage-listed Australian mansion in Sydney's Lower North Shore. Located at 14 Cherry Place, Castle Cove, New South Wales, the castle is situated on a point overlooking Sugarloaf Bay in Middle Harbour.

The property is privately owned. It was added to the New South Wales State Heritage Register on 2 April 1999.

== History ==
The mansion was built by Henry Hastings Willis, a former Member and Speaker of the Parliament of New South Wales, as a home for his family. Construction began in 1903 and was completed in 1905. Originally, the area surrounding the castle was 55 acres.

The castle was built from local sandstone in the late English Gothic style. Access to the castle was originally via rowing boat and a rough bush track. A wharf was later added.

The castle has nine major rooms, with numerous small rooms including a large reception room, drawing room, dining room, four main bedrooms, staff quarters, and a large basement.

The house was named in honour of a ruined abbey at Killarney, Ireland.

== Heritage listing ==
Innisfallen Castle and Grounds was listed on the New South Wales State Heritage Register on 2 April 1999.

== See also ==
- Australian residential architectural styles
