= Bill and Ruth Lucas =

Australian architect duo

Bill (1924–2001) and Ruth (born 1926) Lucas (née Harvey) were a husband and wife duo who together were accomplished Australian architects based in Sydney, best known for designing The Glass House (also known as the Lucas House) in Castlecrag as their own private residence. As an architect, educator, furniture designer, set designer, innovator, and utopian, Bill was involved in over 20 projects in both Castlecrag and later Paddington. Both Bill and Ruth were described as "very good architects in the modern movement in Australia" by Pritzker Architecture Prize 2002 Laureate, Glenn Murcutt.

== Personal lives ==
Bill Lucas was born on 31 December 1924 in Sydney. He was drafted into the RAAF Air Crew service in 1943, where he served for three years. He then had his first education on architecture in University of Sydney where he graduated with honours. Bill went on to work in New Zealand with Hugh Grierson Architects, and designed his first home at Gymea Bay, Sydney, with his brother Neville. Ruth also graduated from the University of Sydney School of Architecture, Design and Planning and was registered as an architect in 1951.

Ruth Harvey is mentioned as the only female architect attending the opening of the exhibition of Retrospective Architecture held in Sydney in 1954.

Between circa 1955 Bill and Ruth met and, in 1956, were married in Paddington. They had six children; Anne, David, Richard, Peter, Christine and Michaela.

The couple designed their famous Glass House at Castlecrag, Sydney in 1957, which became their family home for 5 years. In 1962 they moved to Underwood Street where helped to develop The Paddington Society.

On Monday, 10 September 2001, Bill Lucas died of a heart attack at the Moonbah ski lodge, Thredbo.

== Notable projects ==
=== Design group ===
Between 1955–57 Bill Lucas and Ruth Harvey worked with Neville Gruzman and Tony Moore where they lobbied for the design competition for the Sydney Opera House. Bill was also in the forefront of the campaign to keep Jørn Utzon on as designer.

=== Glass House ===
One of the best-known projects of Bill and Ruth Lucas is The Glass House also simply known as Lucas House, a house designed by Bill Lucas, as the home for Bill and Ruth Lucas, located in the Sydney suburb of Castlecrag. The house is a realization of their idea of an architecture that is 'barely there', or otherwise maintaining their integration with the bush setting. Bill Lucas also emphasizes the importance of the frame as the main structure of the architecture, 'everything that goes on after that destroys the original structure'. The house was built for their family, constructed with economy in mind. It was designed to function both as a studio and residence but within 5 years had become too small for the expanding Lucas family.

=== The Paddington Society ===
The Lucases became actively involved in helping to prevent the suburb of Paddington from comprehensive redevelopment. Paddington was the scene of many historical sites and architecture, notably Juniper Hall and Centennial Park. The Society also lobbied to prevent a sports stadium from being built in Centennial Park. The society still functions today as an action group but also serves to record the historical landmarks of the area. At Paddington, the couple was involved in designing Orange Tree Grove, a medium-density housing project, as well as the Orange Tree Grove Cooperative Art Centre with Owen Tooth, Marion Best and Mary White. Both of them were also involved in arranging the purchase of "Sea View Villa", Oxford Street, Paddington, where Ruth helps to establish Guriganya Progressive Community School.

== Other projects ==
- Block House – Castlecrag, commissioned by Con and Addie Saltis, 1960.
