= City of Willoughby =

- Local government area
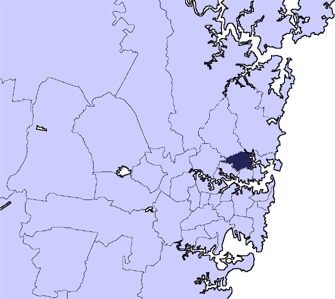
- Location in Metropolitan Sydney

- Interactive map of City of Willoughby
- Coordinates: 33°48′S 151°11′E
- Country: Australia
- State: New South Wales
- Region: North Shore
- Established: 23 October 1865
- Council seat: Chatswood

Government
  - Mayor: Tanya Taylor
  - State electorate: Willoughby
  - Federal divisions: Bradfield; Bennelong

Area
  - Total: 22.6 km^{2} (8.7 sq mi)

Population
  - Totals: 75,613 (2021 census); 80,339 (2023 est.)
  - Density: 3,346/km^{2} (8,665/sq mi)
- Website: City of Willoughby
LGAs around City of Willoughby
Ku-ring-gai	Ku-ring-gai	Northern Beaches
Ryde	City of Willoughby	Northern Beaches
Lane Cove	North Sydney	Mosman

The City of Willoughby is a local government area on the Lower North Shore of Northern Sydney, in the state of New South Wales, Australia. It is located 6 kilometres (3.7 mi) north of the Sydney central business district. It was first proclaimed in October 1865 as the Municipality of North Willoughby.

The main commercial centre of the City of Willoughby is Chatswood, home to one of Sydney's suburban skyscraper clusters. Other commercial centres are the suburbs of Willoughby, St Leonards and Artarmon. Willoughby is situated on an elevated plateau, and all of Sydney's television stations broadcast from towers in the area. Within the City of Willoughby is the Royal North Shore Hospital, located at St Leonards, one of Sydney's major hospitals.

The Council comprises an area of 23 square kilometres (8.9 sq mi), and as at the 2021 census had an estimated population of 75,613.

== Suburbs in the local government area ==
Suburbs and Localities in the City of Willoughby are:

- Artarmon
- Castle Cove
- Castlecrag
- Chatswood
- Chatswood West (shared with City of Ryde)
- Gore Hill (shared with Lane Cove Council)
- Lane Cove North (shared with Lane Cove Council)
- Middle Cove
- Naremburn
- North Willoughby
- Northbridge
- Roseville (shared with Ku-ring-gai Council)
- St Leonards (shared with Lane Cove Council and North Sydney Council)
- Willoughby
- Willoughby East

== Heritage listings ==
The City of Willoughby has a number of heritage-listed sites, including:

- Artarmon, 559 Pacific Highway: Chatswood Reservoirs No. 1 and No. 2
- Castle Cove, 14 Cherry Place: Innisfallen Castle and grounds
- Castlecrag, 375 Edinburgh Road: Buhrich House II
- Castlecrag, 8 The Barbette: Duncan House (Castlecrag)
- Castlecrag, 80 The Bulwark: The Glass House (Castlecrag)
- Castlecrag, 15 The Citadel: Fishwick House
- Chatswood, 258-260 Mowbray Road: Windsor Gardens (Chatswood)
- Chatswood, 313-315 Mowbray Road: Hilton (Chatswood)
- Gore Hill, Pacific Highway: Gore Hill Memorial Cemetery
- Willoughby, 85-87 Penshurst Street: Laurelbank
- Willoughby, 2 Small Street: Walter Burley Griffin Incinerator, Willoughby

== Demographics ==
At the 2016 census, there were 74,302 people in the Willoughby local government area, of these 48.0% were male and 52.0% were female. Aboriginal and Torres Strait Islander people made up 0.2% of the population. The median age of people in the City of Willoughby was 37 years. Children aged 0 – 14 years made up 19.4% of the population and people aged 65 years and over made up 13.6% of the population. Of people in the area aged 15 years and over, 54.6% were married and 8.2% were either divorced or separated.

Population growth in the City of Willoughby between the 2006 Census and the 2011 Census was 5.9%; and in the subsequent five years to the 2016 Census, population growth was 10.3%. When compared with total population growth of Australia for the same periods, being 8.3% and 8.8% respectively, population growth in Willoughby local government area has accelerated faster than the national average.

At the 2016 Census, the proportion of residents in Willoughby local government area who stated their ancestry as Chinese was in excess of four times the state and national averages; and the proportion of households where an Asian language was spoken at home was approximately five times higher than the national average.

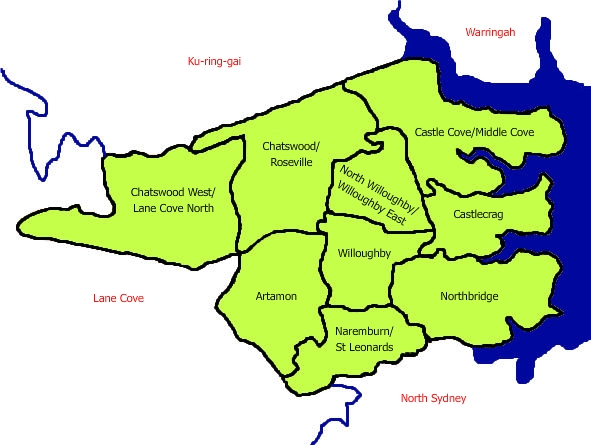
Map of City of Willoughby local government area.

Selected historical census data for Willoughby local government area
Census year		2001	2006	2011	2016	2021
Population	Estimated residents on census night	58,319	63,605	67,356	74,302	75,613
Population	LGA rank in terms of size within New South Wales		19th	▼33rd	▲32nd	▼34th
Population	% of New South Wales population			0.97%	0.99%	0.94%
Population	% of Australian population	0.31%	0.32%	0.31%	0.32%	0.30%
Cultural and language diversity
Ancestry, top responses	English			20.5%	▼18.8%	▲23.5%
Ancestry, top responses	Chinese			14.5%	▲18.6%	▲26.5%
Ancestry, top responses	Australian			18.3%	▼15.6%	▲20.0%
Ancestry, top responses	Irish			7.4%	▼7.3%	▲8.6%
Ancestry, top responses	Scottish			5.6%	▼5.3%	▲7.0%
Language, top responses (other than English)	Mandarin	3.6%	▲5.5%	▲7.2%	▲12.1%	▲12.9%
Language, top responses (other than English)	Cantonese	6.7%	▲7.6%	▼7.5%	▼7.4%	▲7.8%
Language, top responses (other than English)	Korean	1.7%	▲2.7%	▲3.6%	▼3.3%	▼2.3%
Language, top responses (other than English)	Japanese	2.4%	2.4%	▼2.3%	▲2.4%	2.4%
Language, top responses (other than English)	Armenian	n/c	▲1.4%	▼1.3%	▼1.1%	
Language, top responses (other than English)	Hindi					1.4%
Religious affiliation
Religious affiliation, top responses	No religion	18.6%	▲22.0%	▲27.6%	▲36.5%	▲43.0%
Religious affiliation, top responses	Catholic	26.1%	▼25.5%	▼25.0%	▼21.6%	▼20.3%
Religious affiliation, top responses	Anglican	19.5%	▼17.6%	▼15.6%	▼11.5%	▼9.5%
Religious affiliation, top responses	Buddhism	3.7%	▲4.4%	▲4.6%	▼4.3%	▲4.5%
Religious affiliation, top responses	Not Stated				8.7%	▼5.0%
Median weekly incomes						
Personal income	Median weekly personal income		A$728	A$858	A$946	A$1,145
Personal income	% of Australian median income		156.2%	148.7%	142.9%	142.2%
Family income	Median weekly family income		A$1,667	A$2,479	A$2,671	A$3,235
Family income	% of Australian median income		162.3%	167.4%	154.0%	152.6%
Household income	Median weekly household income		A$2,066	A$1,996	A$2,271	A$2,556
Household income	% of Australian median income		176.4%	161.8%	157.9%	146.4%

== Council ==
=== Current composition and election method ===
A map of the three wards, as of the 2021 local elections.

Willoughby City Council is composed of thirteen councillors, including the mayor, for a fixed four-year term of office. The Mayor is directly elected while the twelve other councillors are elected proportionally as four separate wards, each electing three councillors. The most recent Council election was held on 14 September 2024.

Party	Councillors
Independents	13
Total	13

The current Council is:

Ward	Councillor	Party	Notes
Mayor	Tanya Taylor	Independent	Mayor 2021–present.
Middle Harbour	Robert Samuel	Independent	
Middle Harbour	Angelo Rozos	Independent	Elected 2012; Deputy Mayor Aug–Dec 2021; Deputy Mayor 2024-present.
Middle Harbour	Kristina Dodds	Independent	
Naremburn	Anna Greco	Independent	
Naremburn	Georgie Roussac	Independent	
Naremburn	Nic Wright	Independent	Elected 2012.
Sailors Bay	Sarah Royds	Independent	
Sailors Bay	John Moratelli	Independent	
Sailors Bay	Roy McCullagh	Independent	
West	Craig Campbell	Independent	Elected 2017.
West	Michelle Chuang	Independent	
West	Andrew Nelson	Independent	

== History ==
=== Aboriginal culture ===
As of January 2022, Willoughby Council has announced that Talus Street Reserve, on Gammeraygal land in the suburb of Naremburn would be handed back to the Local Aboriginal Land Council (LALC). The precinct includes a creek, bushland, walking tracks, picnic tables and parking areas. Nathan Moran, CEO of the Metropolitan LALC told NITV News that the hand back represents the realisation of Aboriginal Land Rights. "Returning crown land is recompense for loss of all freehold, leasehold and or state-owned and used land as well for not getting royalties for mining," he said.

Willoughby Mayor, Tanya Taylor, described the reserve as "beautiful land" and emphasised the council's resounding support for the decision. "Council acknowledges the rich Indigenous history of the Gammeraygal people in the area. The transfer will embed this significant indigenous heritage, drive cultural and social outcomes as it affirms Aboriginal Land Rights and supports reconciliation", Mayor Taylor said.

=== European settlement ===
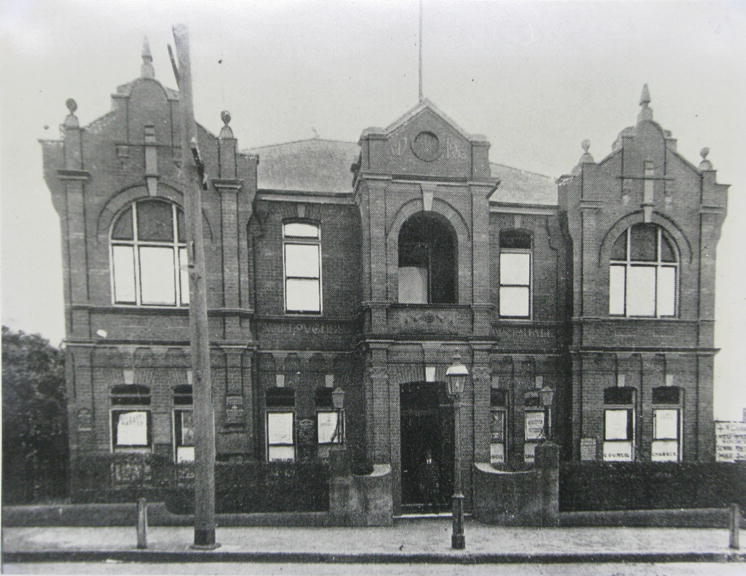
The first Willoughby Town Hall, on Victoria Avenue, Chatswood, 1907. Built in 1903, was demolished in 1969 to make way for the new town hall and is now the site of The Concourse.

In May 1865, 67 residents of the rural District of Willoughby sent a petition to the Governor Sir John Young, requesting the incorporation of the Municipality of North Willoughby. This resulted in the Municipality of North Willoughby being formally proclaimed on 23 October 1865. The council first met to elect six Councillors and two Auditors on 16 December 1865, in the house of James Harris French and the first chairman, James William Bligh, was elected on 1 January 1866.

There were no wards until 1876 when the council was divided into three wards: Chatsworth Ward to the north, Middle Harbour Ward to the east and Lane Cove Ward to the west. Lane Cove Ward became the separate Municipality of Lane Cove on 11 February 1895 and Middle Harbour Ward was divided into Middle Harbour and Naremburn wards. With the passing of the Municipalities Act, 1867, the name was changed to be the Borough of North Willoughby, which then changed to Borough of Willoughby in the Borough of Willoughby Naming Act 1890. In June 1900, a petition to expand the number of wards from three to four, each electing three aldermen, was proclaimed dividing Chatsworth Ward into Chatswood East and West wards in addition to Middle Harbour and Naremburn wards. From 28 December 1906, with the passing of the Local Government Act, 1906, the council area was renamed the Municipality of Willoughby. In August 1941, the Minister for Local Government, James McGirr, approved a proposal to split Middle Harbour Ward, adding Northbridge Ward as the fifth ward electing three aldermen.

The first council meetings were held in a hut located behind the main residence of major landholder and timer merchant, James Harris French, on the corner of Penshurst and Penkivil Streets. Municipal offices were afterwards established in Penshurst Street near Forsyth Street corner. These were in turn followed by the Council Chambers in the old School of Arts building in Mowbray Road from 1877, which then became part of the Mowbray House School. These chambers were replaced in 1903 by the first Town Hall building in Victoria Avenue, designed by Byera Hadley and officially opened by the Premier, Sir John See, on 2 September 1903. The first town hall was demolished in 1969 and replaced by the second Willoughby Town Hall with the adjacent Council Administration Centre as the "Willoughby Civic Centre". The council was granted city status and was proclaimed as the City of Willoughby on 17 November 1989 by Sir David Martin, Governor of New South Wales.

A 2015 review of local government boundaries by the NSW Government Independent Pricing and Regulatory Tribunal recommended that the City of Willoughby merge with adjoining councils. The government considered two proposals. The first proposed a merger of the North Sydney and Willoughby Councils to form a new council with an area of 33 square kilometres (13 sq mi) and support a population of approximately 145,000. The alternative, proposed by Warringah Council on 23 February 2016, was for an amalgamation of the Pittwater, Manly and Warringah councils. As a consequence of Warringah's proposal, the New South Wales Minister for Local Government Paul Toole proposed that the North Sydney, Willoughby and Mosman Councils merge. In July 2017, the Berejiklian government decided to abandon the forced merger of the North Sydney, Willoughby and Mosman local government areas, along with several other proposed forced mergers.

=== Council seal ===
The Council seal first appeared in records on 7 May 1867, containing only the words "Municipality of North Willoughby Common Seal". In 1890 the floral emblem was used in the middle of the seal for the first time with "Borough of Willoughby". Willoughby became a City on 17 November 1989 and the city crest was altered accordingly, with the wording "The Council of the City of Willoughby" replacing the previous title and a mural crown added to symbolise city status. It was this latest seal that was incorporated into the Willoughby City Flag, designed by John Vaughan and first flown on 12 May 1990.

The present council seal, formally adopted in August 1990, contains an emblem of various native flowers:

- Waratah – Telopea speciosissima
- Christmas Bell – Blandfordia grandiflora
- Sydney Red Gum – Angophora costata
- Flannel Flower – Actinotus helianthi
- Native Rose – Boronia serrulata

Two of the main pioneering industries of the area are also symbolised in the seal: the tanning industry represented by the leather belt and the brick-making industry represented in the mural crown. In July 1999, council adopted a corporate logo, taking the form of a stylised Waratah, with the phrase "City of Diversity".

== International Relations ==
=== Global Friendship Cities ===
Willoughby City Council has five friendly city relationships, which are reflective of the local community and are based on community development and cultural exchange. These relationships are with:

- Suginami since 1990,
- Bingara since 1994,
- Guardia Sanframondi since 1998,
- Gangdong District since 2011, and
- Nor Nork since 2015.
