= Marion Hall Best =

(1905–1988) interior designer

- Born: Marion Esdail Burkitt; April 13, 1905; Dubbo, New South Wales
- Died: June 26, 1988 (aged 83); Darling Point, Sydney
- Education: University of Sydney
- Occupation: Interior designer

Marion Hall Best (13 April 1905 – 26 June 1988) was an influential interior designer in Sydney, Australia. She practiced between 1938 and 1974, mainly working on commercial, domestic and public projects. She was a strong figure in advocating for interior decoration to be recognized as a profession, now known as interior design.

== Personal life ==
She was born Marion Esdail Burkitt on 13 April 1905 at Dubbo, New South Wales, fourth and youngest child of Edmond Henry Burkitt and Amy Theodora, née Hungerford. In 1927 she married Sydney dentist John Victor Hall Best in Darling Point, Sydney. Marion Hall Best’s daughter Deidre Hall Best also studied at the University of Sydney architecture school, graduating in 1955 and as Deidre Broughton, she provided much material for the Marion Hall Best collection held by the Sydney Living Museum. Marion Hall Best died on 26 June 1988 in Darling Point.

== Education ==
Marion attended Frensham School in Mittagong NSW and initially trained and worked as a nurse. Holidays in Palm Beach NSW led to her first decorating project at her mother’s house Farleigh in 1929. During the 1920s and 30s Best studied painting with Thea Proctor and embroidery with June Scott Stevenson, moving indirectly into interior decoration. In 1938 Marion Hall Best enrolled in the first year Architecture course at The University of Sydney under its founding chair Professor Leslie Wilkinson. In 1939-1940 she completed a correspondence course in interior decorating based in New York.

== Professional career ==
She established Marion Best fabrics workroom and display area in Queen Street, Woollahra in 1938 and later in 1949 a small shop in Rowe Street, Sydney, then well known as a sophisticated and cosmopolitan area in central Sydney. She was influenced by 1920s Modernism and 1970s Minimalism alongside The Bauhaus. She stocked local designers Gordon Andrews, Clement Meadmore, Roger Maclay and Leonard French and was influential in setting up the contacts for the importation of international textiles, furniture, and wallpaper of designers such as Marimekko, Herman Miller, Eero Saarinen, Noguchi, McGuire and Jim Thompson. The workshop in Woollahra was also the location of Marion Best Pty Ltd Interior Design operating until its closure in 1974. A number of Australian artists were commissioned to design fabrics for sale in the showrooms under the brand Marion Best Fabrics. These included Amie Kingston and Dora Sweetapple and were produced by Gilkes & Co. Post-war her work was published in home magazines reaching a wide audience. She ran the David Jones Art Gallery in 1947-48. At the sixth Australian Architectural convention in 1956 Marion Hall Best presented a paper titled “Design for Every Day Things: Furnishings”.

== Built projects ==
Private residential and commercial commissions included the interiors of the Lady Gowrie Child Centre 1941 Erskineville, Peter Playfair's Dining Alcove 1953 Elizabeth Bay NSW, a set of “Luxury Flats for Moderate Incomes” at 7 Elizabeth Street Sydney, Lewarne House in Neutral Bay 1965–1980, Cater House in Red Hill Canberra 1965, Moonbah Ski Lodge Thredbo (with Bill Lucas) 1959–1961, Crebbin House in Castlecrag Sydney 1960–1975, the Hyatt Hotel Kings Cross Sydney decorated in 1969–70, Room for Peter Sculthorpe Sydney 1971 and The Grove, the Hall Best house in Woollahra, Sydney. The last was featured both in Vogue Australia April–May 1968, and Australian Home Journal February 1969.

== Exhibitions ==
Hall Best's most well-known exhibition is her Room for Mary Quant 1967 Sydney. Her "Classic Modern" and "Young Modern" designs for a room in an exhibition for the Australian Red Cross Society New South Wales Division in 1941 achieved wide publicity. Exhibitions which included interiors by Hall Best were "Rare and Beautiful Things: an exhibition" at the Gallery of NSW (1961), Sydney's "Ten best dressed rooms" (1962), Rooms on view (1967), Rooms on view 1971 (1971).

The Marion Hall Best Collection is maintained by the Caroline Simpson Library & Research Collection, Sydney and consists of papers, plans, photographs, wallpapers, fabrics and furnishings.

== Affiliations ==
- Society of Interior Designers of Australia, founding member in 1951.
