= Archer Hoskings =

Archer William Hoskings
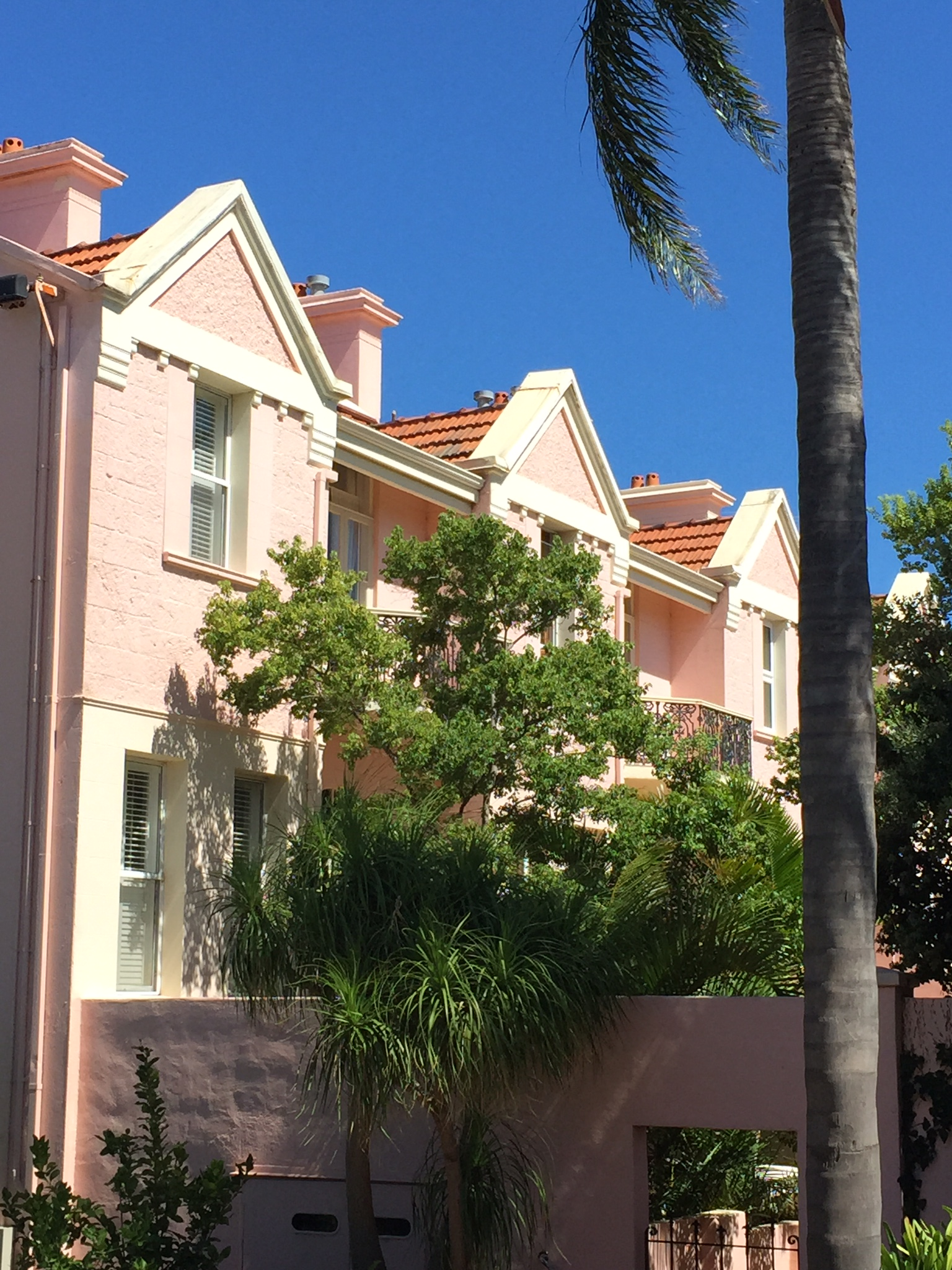
- Matheson's Terrace, Claremont
- Born: 21 May 1868; Surry Hills, New South Wales, Australia
- Died: 15 June 1912 (aged 44); Johannesburg, South Africa
- Education: Newington College; Sydney Technical College; Royal Academy Schools
- Occupation: Architect
- Spouse: Winifred Vivian
- Parent(s): Emily (née Barett) and William Henry Hoskings

Archer William Hoskings (21 May 1868 – 15 June 1912) was an Australian born architect who practiced in Sydney, London, Perth and Johannesburg before his death at 44.

== Early life ==
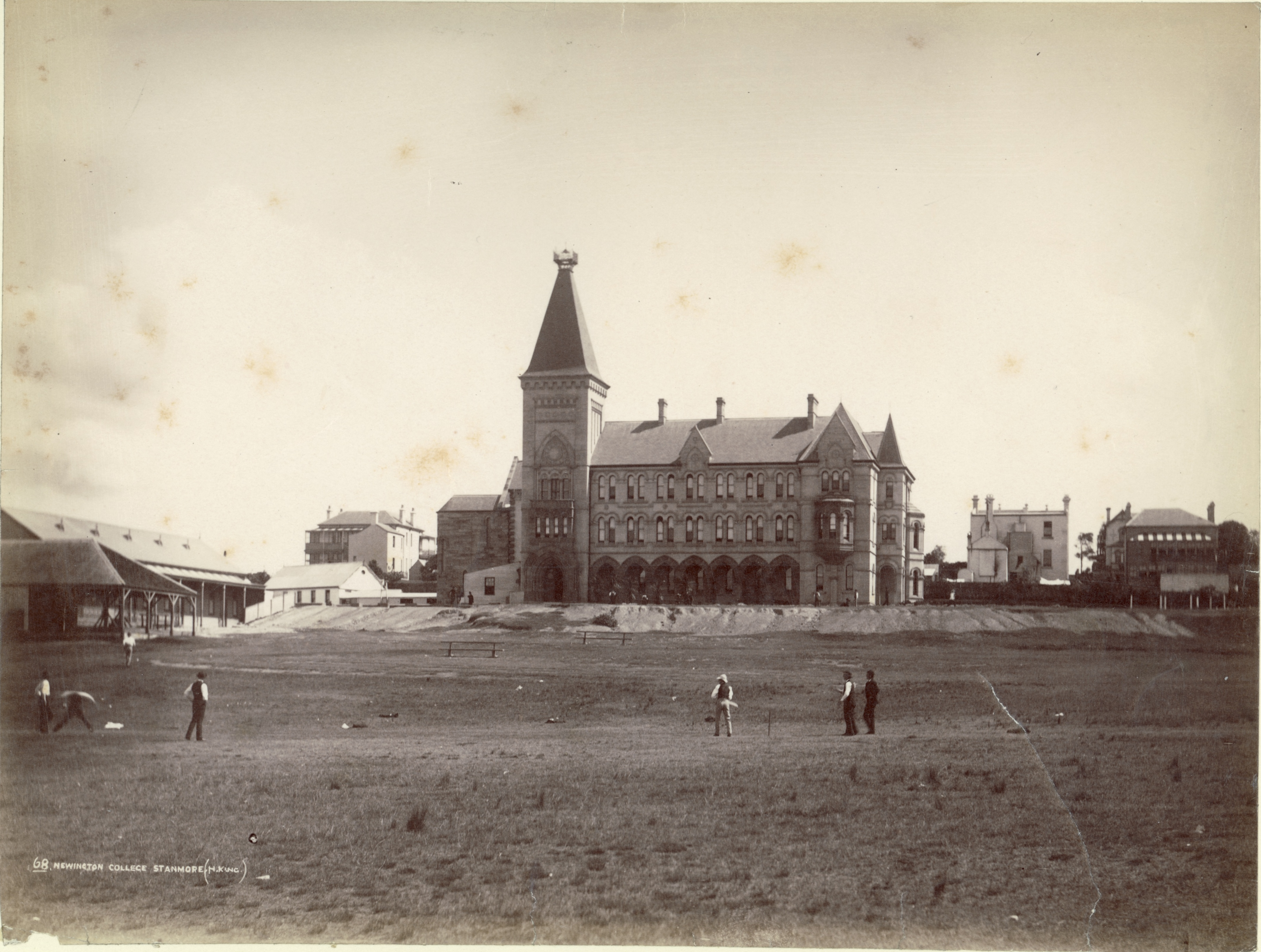
Newington College

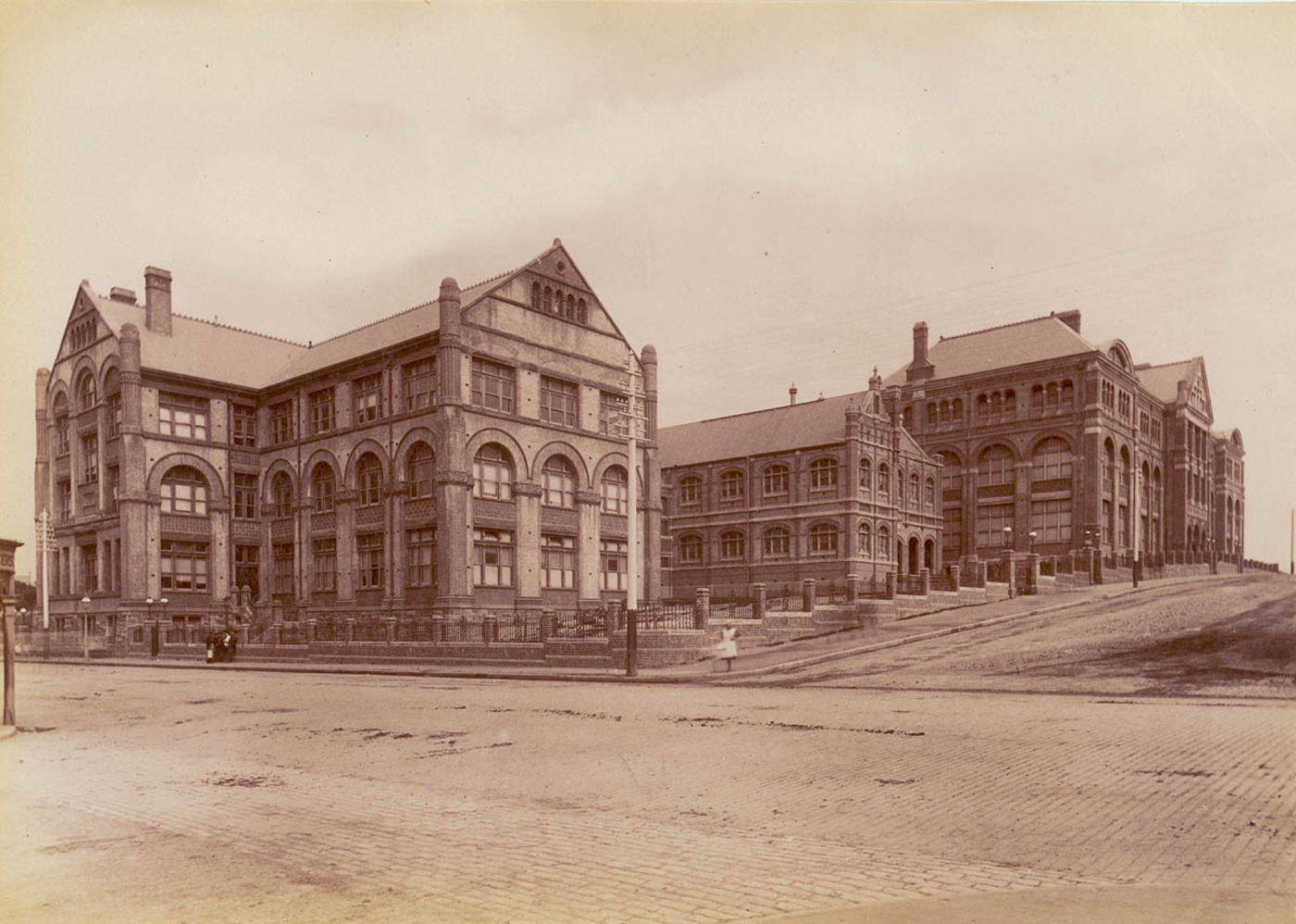
Sydney Technical College

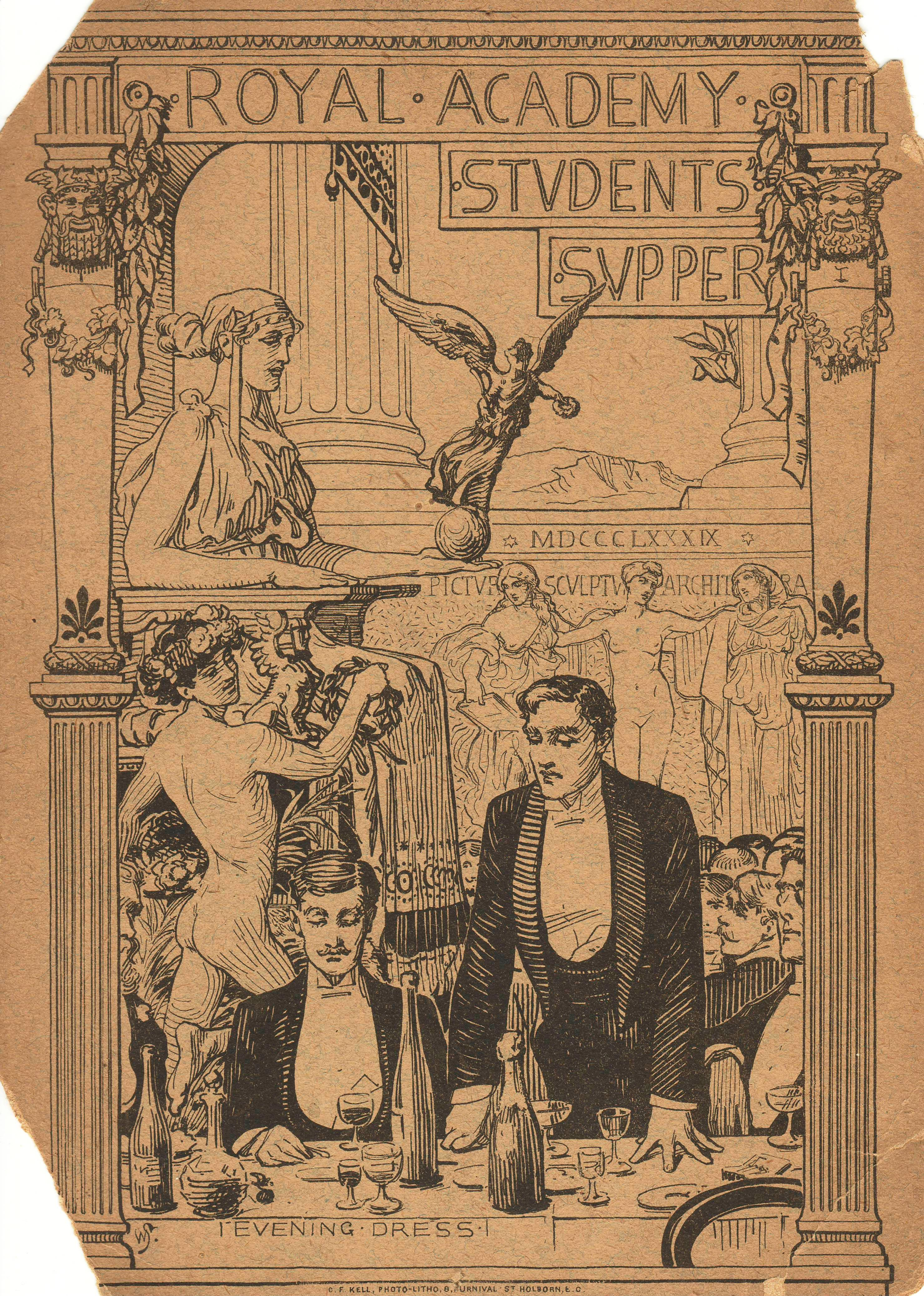
Royal Academy Students Supper 1889

Hoskings was born in Surry Hills, Sydney. He was the first of six children born to Emily (née Barrett) and her husband industrialist William Henry Hoskings. His younger brother was Arthur Hoskings who later in life played cricket for a combined Canada/USA team. Hoskings’s early education was at Burwood Public School. In 1881 he commenced his senior education at Newington College remaining there until 1883. At the time his well to do family lived in Middleton Street, Stanmore, immediately behind the college grounds and he was a day boy. On leaving school he was briefly employed by the builder A.A. Tayt but in 1884 he commenced serving his articles with architects and engineers Kenwood & Kurle and studying architecture at Sydney Technical College. At 16 years of age he won a student competition for a pavilion at Ashfield and at the age of 18 he won a competition for the design of the Wollongong Town Hall. In 1886 Kenwood & Kerle supervised the construction of the building.

== London ==
In 1888, Hoskings travelled to England and obtained a position as an assistant architect to Charles Barry Jr. On 11 July 1889 he enrolled in the Royal Academy Schools to study architecture. That year he was recommended by Barry as an Associate of the Royal Institute of British Architects (RIBA). Barry saw him as being "a young man of more than average ability". At 21 years of age Hoskings was the youngest member ever admitted to the Institute. In January 1891 Hoskings won the Soane Medallion a £50 travelling scholarship awarded by RIBA.

== Perth ==
In 1892 Hoskings returned to Australia and in early 1894 was appointed as a draftsman with the Public Works Department (PWD) in Perth, Western Australia. In April 1895, principal government architect George Temple-Poole addressed a gathering of Hoskings’ PWD associates who met to farewell the young architect as he entered into private practice. Complimentary reference was made to the services which Hoskings had rendered and to his social qualities. Works known to have been designed by Hoskings in Western Australia include the former Oddfellows Hall in Leederville, Matheson's Terrace in Claremont and The Railway Hotel in Coolgardie. In December 1897 Hoskings took Thomas Tandy as a partner. He wrote a letter titled ‘The Education Question’ to the editor of the Sydney Morning Herald in February 1902.

== Later life ==
Later in 1902 Hoskings travelled to South Africa to seek new opportunities and was joined by Henry Hugh Walford in partnership. He married Winifred Vivian in Johannesburg in August 1904 and remained in architectural practice in South Africa until 1912 when he died on 15 June at his residence in Johannesburg.
