= Windsor Gardens, Chatswood =

Windsor Gardens
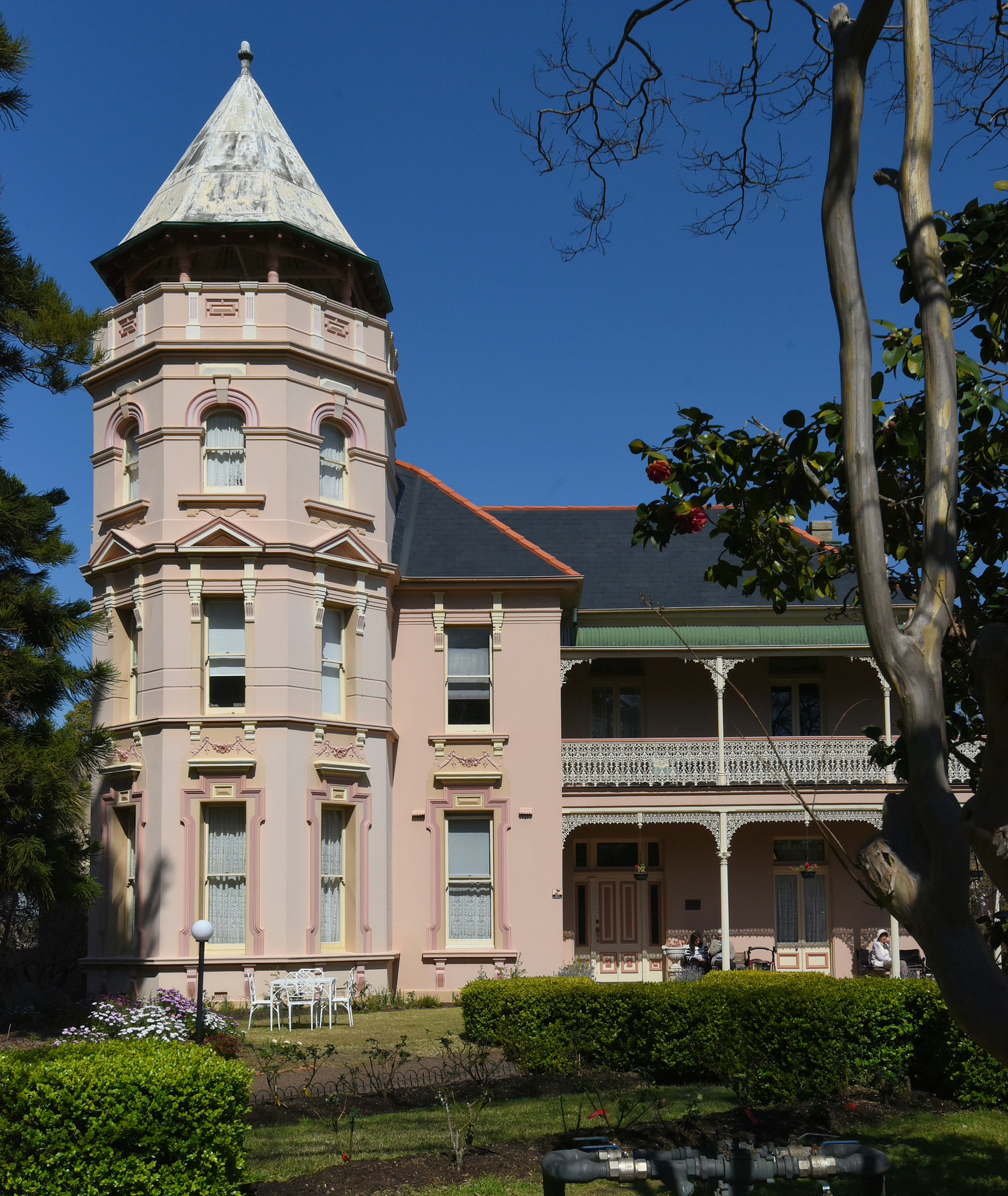
- Windsor Gardens

- Location within Sydney Location within Australia
- 33°48′07″S 151°11′23″E
- Location: 258-260 Mowbray Road, Chatswood, City of Willoughby, New South Wales, Australia

History
- Built: 1888

Site notes
- Architectural style: Italianate
- Owner: Millstern Health Care Pty Ltd

New South Wales Heritage Register
- Official name: Windsor Gardens; Iroquois
- Type: State heritage (built)
- Designated: 2 April 1999
- Reference no.: 571
- Type: Mansion
- Category: Residential buildings (private)

Windsor Gardens is a heritage-listed former residence, reception venue and now retirement village located at Chatswood, City of Willoughby, New South Wales, Australia. It was built in 1888. It is also known as Iroquois. The property is privately owned. It was added to the New South Wales State Heritage Register on 2 April 1999.

== History ==
Windsor Gardens was built in 1888 by American journalist Frank Coffee, who arrived in Sydney in 1882 as a reporter for the New York Herald. It was originally named Iroquois after an American battleship visiting Sydney at the time.

During the early years, Mass was held each month in the drawing room of Iroquois for the local Catholic community by a priest from Riverview College. This was because there was no Catholic Church between North Sydney and Pymble.

The large Coffee family lived in the house until the late 1920s when it was sold to the Burke family. Frank Coffee died in 1929 at Kirribillli. His wife died in 1943. During his lifetime Frank Coffee made some forty to fifty trips around the Pacific and subsequently wrote and published his book Forty Years on the Pacific

According to anecdotal evidence, Windsor Gardens was owned by John Adrian Burke from 1930 to 1945. In 1945 it was purchased by Allan Gilbert who renamed it Windsor Gardens and converted it into a venue for wedding receptions.

On 13 May 1986 an Interim Conservation Order was made over Windsor Gardens to ensure that a retirement village development proposal was sympathetic to the significance of Windsor Gardens. On 28 July 1988 a Permanent Conservation Order was placed over the property.

== Description ==
A late Victorian, two-storeyed rendered brick house with a two-storey verandah and a four-storey tower. Interiors original finished in cedar and walnut imported from USA. Frank Coffee's initials were incorporated within the elaborate internal plasterwork and staircase joinery, all of which survive. Much of the original garden survives including exotic trees, some of which were imported from Japan and California, partly obscure the house from the street.

== Heritage listing ==
As at 28 November 2006, Windsor Gardens is a good example of a high Victorian gentleman's residence that was localed in the semi-rural, outer suburbs of the late nineteenth century of Sydney. It has retained much of its original detailing, both internally and externally. The house ad gardens as a reception centre played an important role in the lives of many people since the end of World War II. It was the home of a prominent early resident, Frank Coffee, and was an early centre of worship for the local Catholic community.

Windsor Gardens was listed on the New South Wales State Heritage Register on 2 April 1999.

== Gallery ==
Images following show the Italianate detailing on Windsor Gardens:

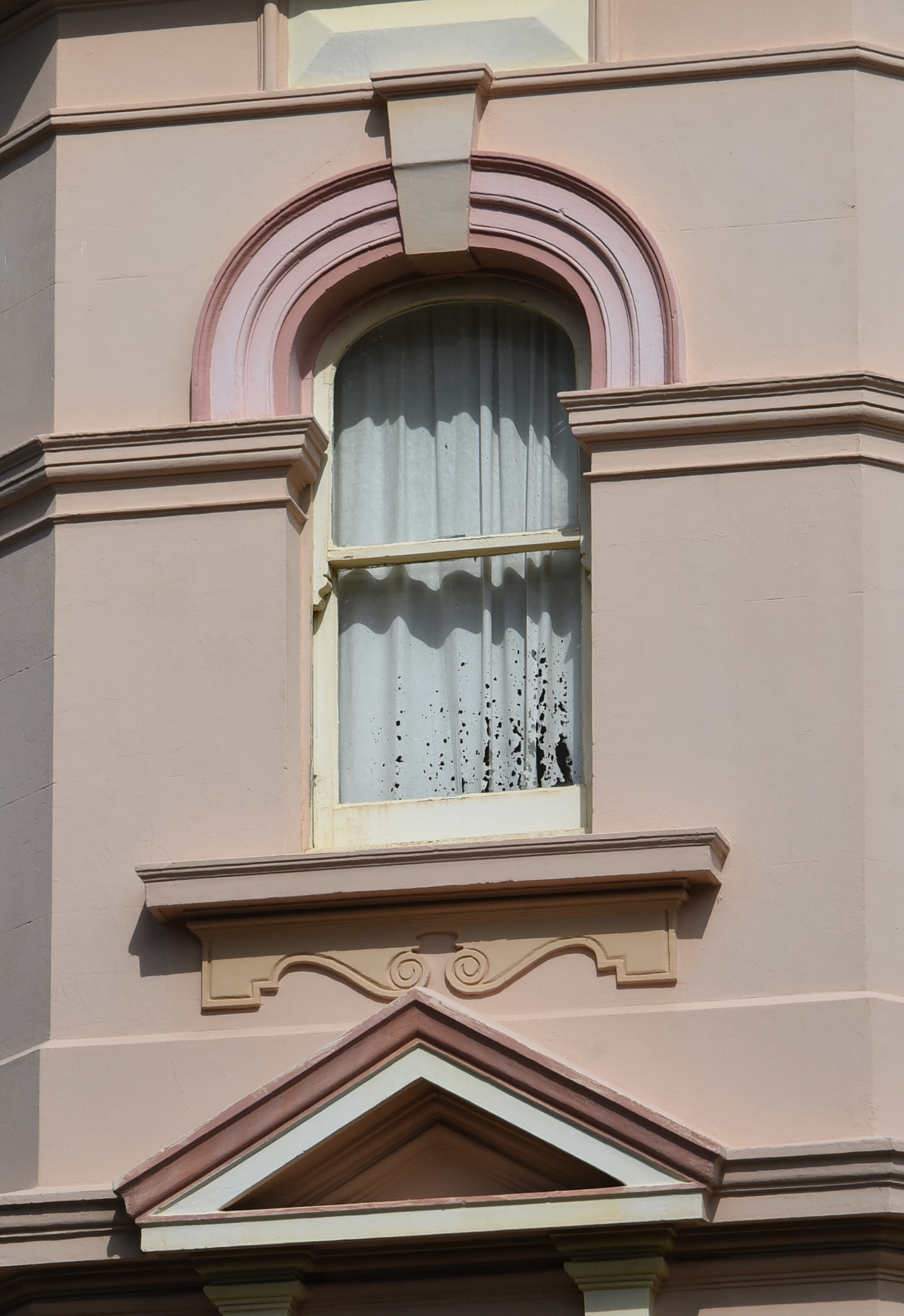

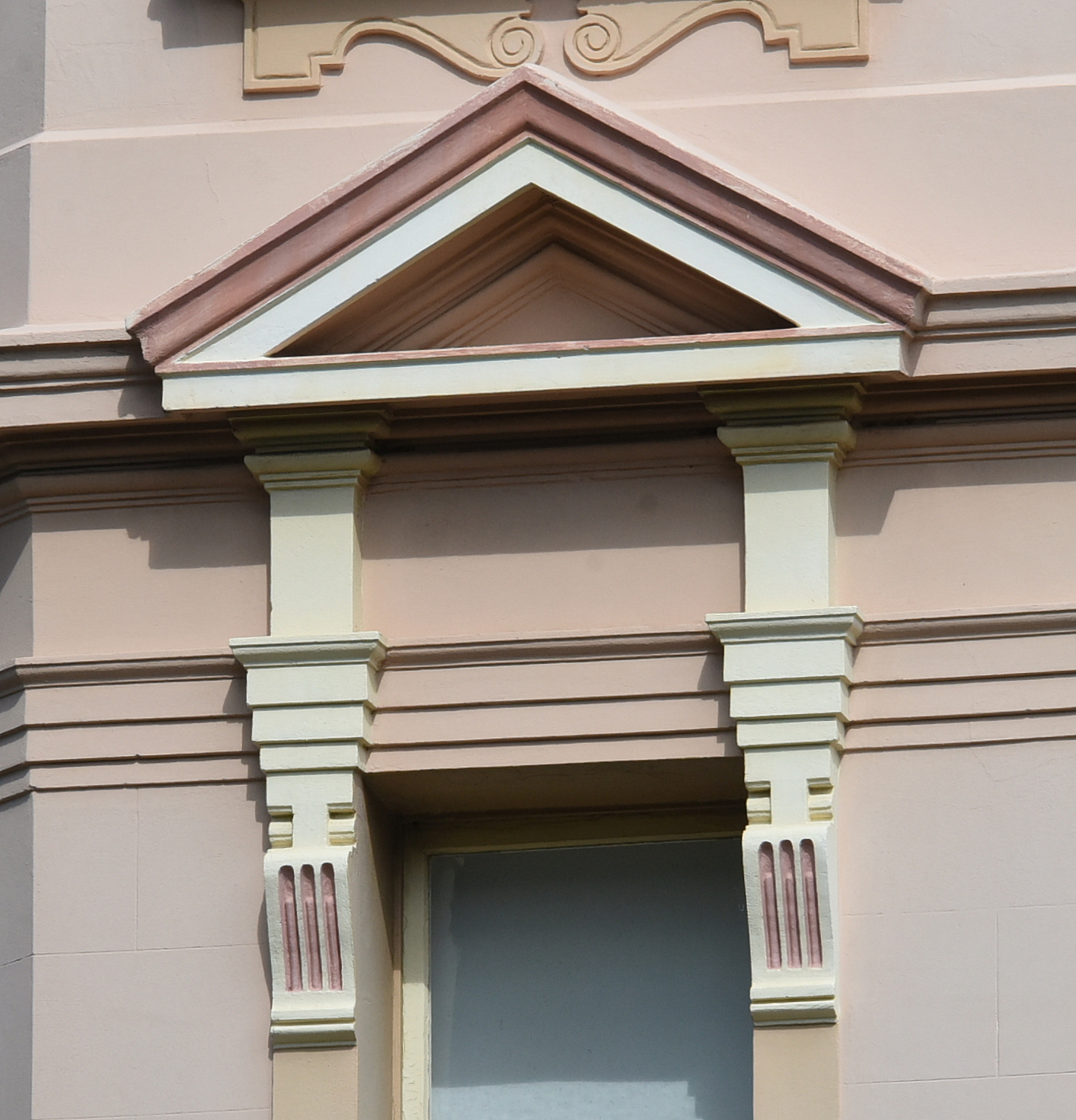

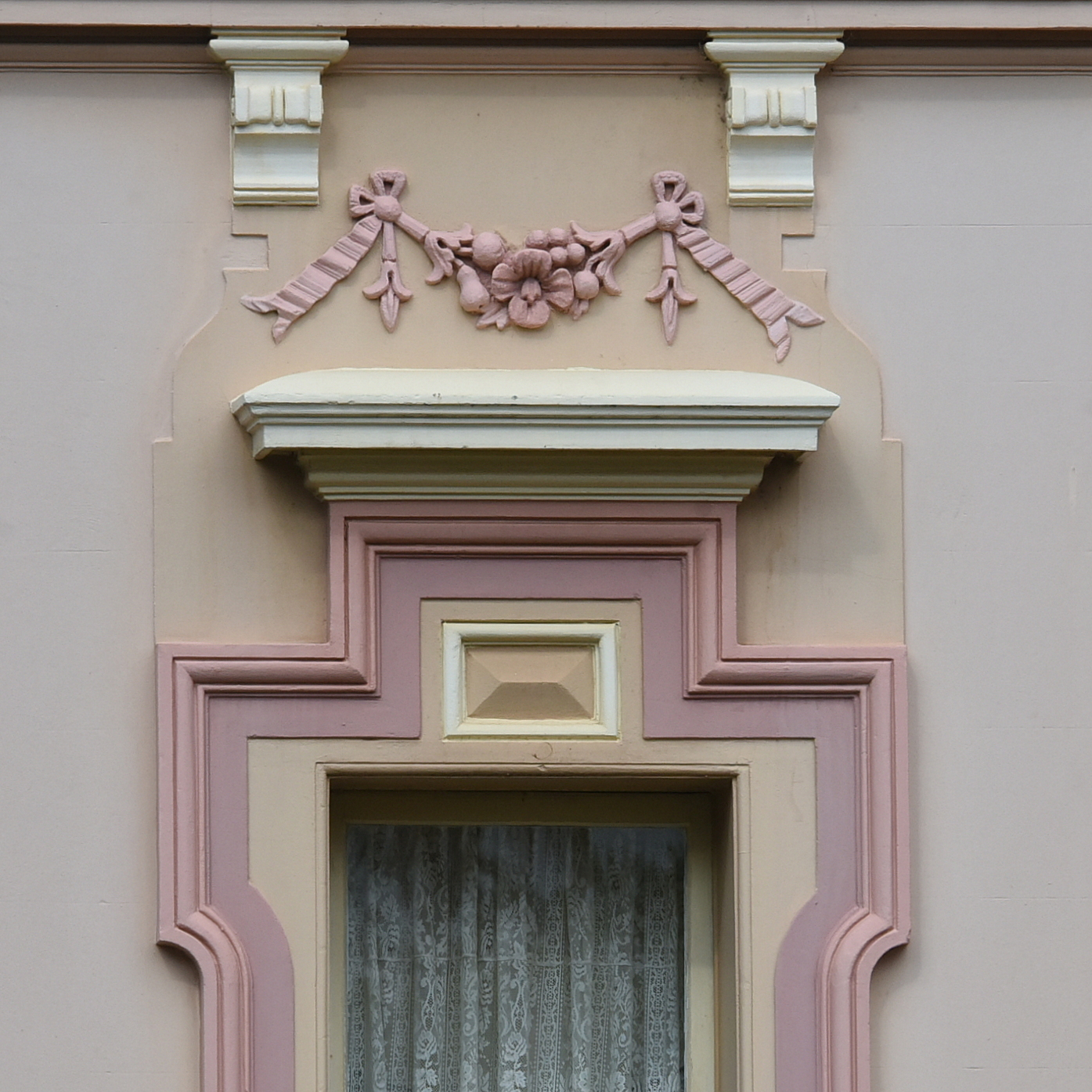

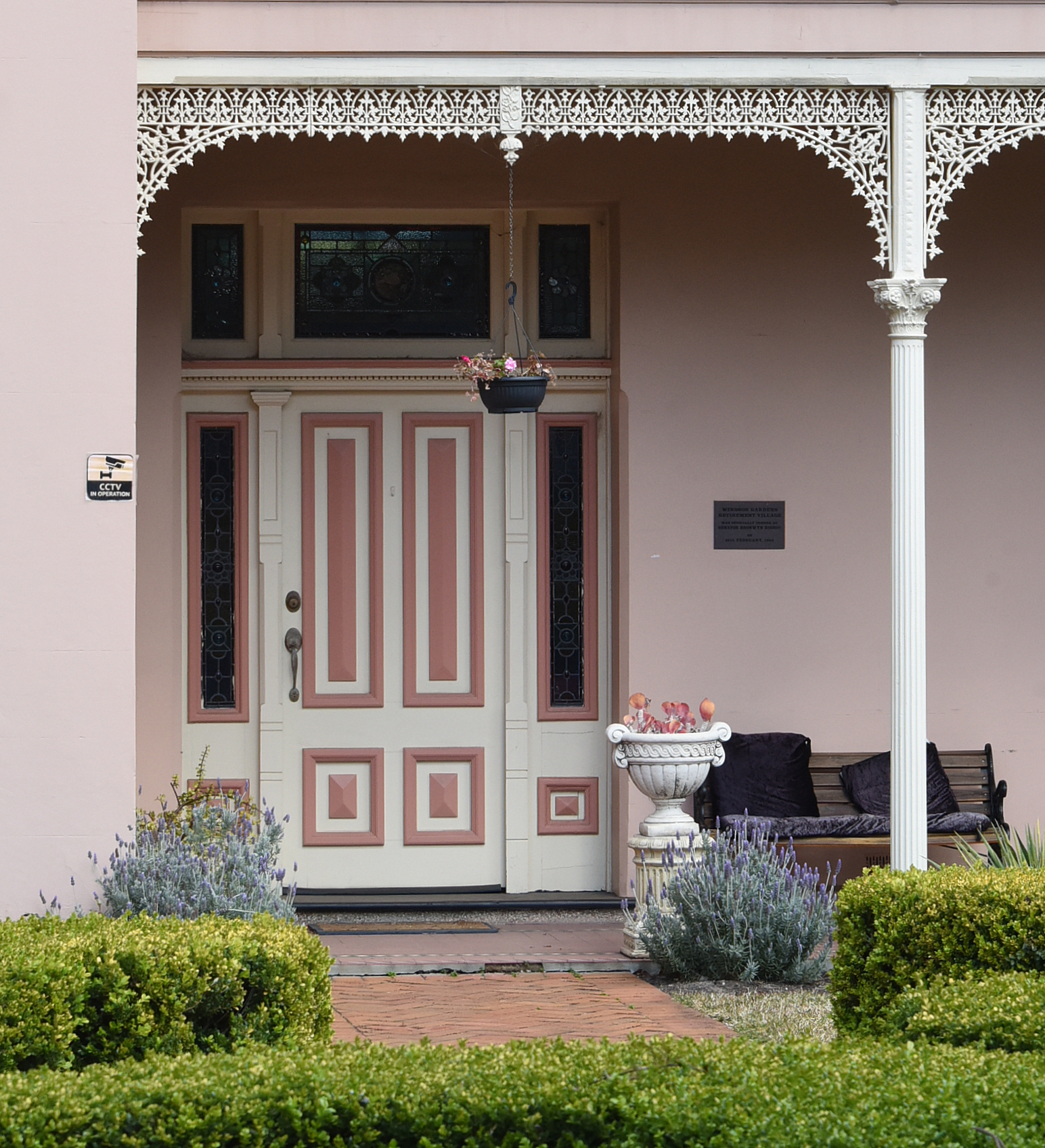

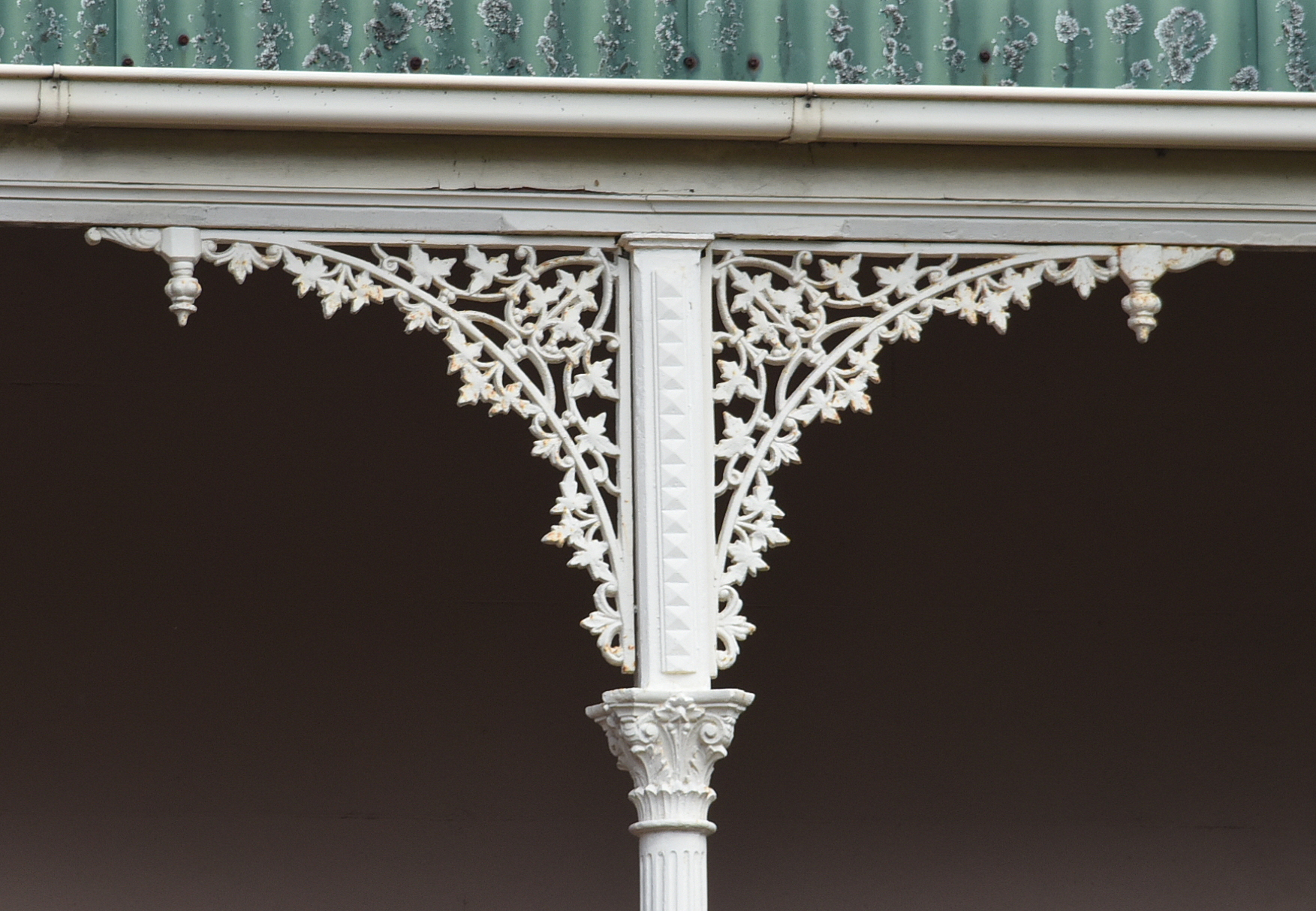

== See also ==
- Australian residential architectural styles
