= Tocal College =

Historic site in Tocal, Australia

Tocal College — C.B. Alexander Campus
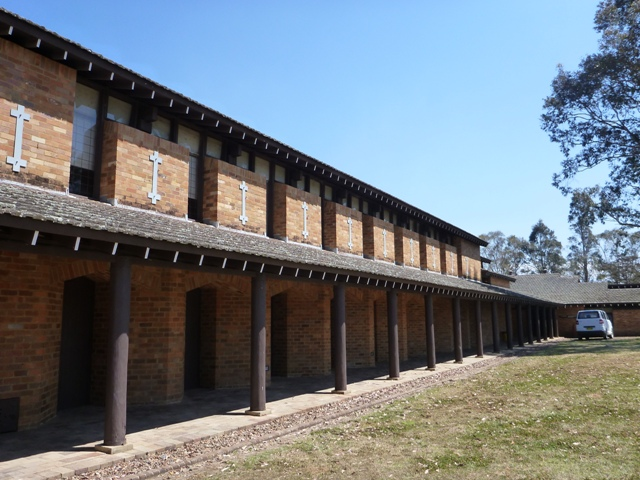
- Exterior view of main hall

- Location within New South Wales Location within Australia
- 32.6297°S 151.5920°E
- Location: 815 Tocal Road, Tocal, City of Maitland, New South Wales, Australia

History
- Built: 1963–1965

Site notes
- Architect(s): Philip Cox and Ian McKay
- Owner: C.B. Alexander Foundation

New South Wales Heritage Register
- Official name: Tocal College: C.B. Alexander Campus and Movable Collection
- Type: state heritage (complex / group)
- Designated: 17 April 2013
- Reference no.: 1908
- Type: Tertiary College
- Category: Education

Tocal College is a heritage-listed agricultural college at 815 Tocal Road, Tocal, City of Maitland, New South Wales, Australia. It was designed by Philip Cox and Ian McKay and built from 1963 to 1965. It was formerly known as C.B. Alexander Campus or C.B. Alexander Presbyterian Agricultural College. The property is owned by the C. B. Alexander Foundation. It was added to the New South Wales State Heritage Register on 17 April 2013. The college is now known as the Tocal Agricultural Centre, a Centre of Excellence within NSW Department of Primary Industries.

== History ==
=== Early history of Tocal site ===
The college was established on land originally part of the colonial Tocal Estate which is located on a knoll in the Paterson River valley, NSW. Tocal is in the Hunter Valley region of NSW at the junction of the Paterson River and Webbers Creek. The Paterson River valley was once occupied by the Gringai clan of the Wanaruah (or Wonnarua) Aboriginal people. The diverse ecosystems that were once prevalent in the valley from the rainforest along the river banks to the wetlands, lagoons and surrounding paperbark forests provided an abundance of food, fresh water and materials. The land on which the Tocal Homestead and College is situated was used by the Gringai clan for many years. Grooves worn into rocks by grinding seeds and plants, indicate Tocal was a popular camp site for the Aboriginal people. "Tocal" is an Aboriginal word, and at one stage it was thought to mean "ducks-a-plenty" in the local Aboriginal dialect. However, the weight of recent evidence indicates Tocal simply means "big" or "plenty". Aboriginal grinding grooves have been located within the homestead complex at Tocal.

In 1801 Colonel William Paterson surveyed the area at the request of Governor King. The first wave of Europeans were convict timber loggers as the alluvial river valley was abundant in red cedar. The Paterson River became known as the "Cedar Arm". The first land grant in the area was made to John Powell in 1818 on land by the river to the south of the town. The river was navigable and the town site was the third to be surveyed in the Hunter Valley and soon became an important river port. Tobacco, grains, grapes, wine and citrus fruits and were cultivated in the area. Shipbuilding also commenced with the development of the river trade.

James Webber was granted land at Tocal in 1822 where he went on to produce tobacco and become an early pioneer of viticulture in the colony. Tocal's frontage to the tidal section of the Paterson River gave the property access to the port of Morpeth and shipping access to Sydney. Webber built a two-storey barn which is still extant and drained part of Tocal's wetland. By 1828 Tocal was 3,300 acres after Webber had added to the grant by purchasing adjoining Crown land. The farm land, stone barn, blacksmiths shop, barracks supervisor's cottage remain intact and as a whole include the land upon which the college was later built. Webber sold Tocal in 1834 and by 1843 it was in the hands of lessee Charles Reynolds.

Charles Reynolds leased the property from Felix in 1844. He has been described as a "genial man of dignity and intelligence" who was well respected by those (he) associated (with) in the agricultural industry in NSW as a cattle and horse breeder. During the next 82 years, Charles and subsequently, his widow Frances, his son Frank and grandson Darcie, managed Tocal, to become one of the most important Hereford, Devon and thoroughbred studs in the country. In this period, the road through the property to Maitland improved, although the river trade began to decline. His son, Frank Reynolds finally managed to purchase Tocal from the Wilson family in 1907. The establishment of the railway in 1911 dislocated the operation of the property.

In 1926, Jane (Jean) Alexander bought Tocal from the Reynolds family continuing the reputation of Tocal for its successful graziers. The Alexander family consisted of Jean, Isabella, Robert and Charles Alexander, all of whom were elderly and unmarried. By 1939 only Charles remained, and he invited his two nieces, Myrtle and Marquerita Curtis, daughters of his late sister Margaret, to reside with him at Tocal. Charles Boyd Alexander is noted for the introduction of new technologies replacing labour-intensive farming operations, moving Tocal in the direction now associated with modern agriculture. Following Charles' death in 1947, the two sisters remained at Tocal until their death five days apart in 1985, at the ages of 94 and 97 respectively. When Charles Boyd Alexander died in 1947, he left a very large estate and a complex will. His intention was that his substantial estate, comprising not only Tocal but other property and assets, be used to help Protestant orphan and destitute children, for "their training to fit them for a life on the land". However, because of the will's nature, an acceptable proposal for the use of the estate did not come before the Equity Court until 1963.

It was due to the efforts of Edward Alan Hunt, MBE, a co- founder of the legal practice Hunt and Hunt, Bligh St, Sydney and honorary solicitors for the Presbyterian Church in NSW, that the Equity Court, in 1963, accepted the recommendation of the C. B. Alexander Trustees that the Presbyterian Church be allowed to use the bequest to establish an Agricultural College in the grounds of Tocal at Paterson in addition to a boy's home at Emerald Hills, Leppington, north of Camden. By involving Leppington, the Church met the requirement that the bequest be used to help destitute children. Scholarships from Leppington would be offered at Tocal if any of the boys were to show a bent for advanced training in agriculture. On the other hand, the Alexander Estate could underwrite the cost of the home at Leppington and also build an Agricultural College at Tocal. The former would become known as the St Andrew's Presbyterian Agricultural College, Emerald Hills, Leppington, NSW, and the latter as the Charles Boyd Alexander Presbyterian Agricultural College. Hunt's fascination with Tocal that had begun as a child whilst on fishing trips to the Paterson River from his nearby home at Kirkton, near Belford, was to continue for a life time.

=== Architects and the Emerald Hills project ===
In 1962, Philip Sutton Cox graduated from the University of Sydney with honours in architecture, with the award of the Royal Australian Institute of Architect's silver medal, and with already proven experience in the office of Bruce Rickard as well as a practice in New Guinea, where he designed a number of buildings some of which were published in Architecture Australia. Whilst many of his university colleagues travelled overseas to either northern Europe or North America, Cox was content to stay in Australia to work locally. His first post graduate position was with Figgis and Jefferson at 34 Alfred Street, Milson's Point.

It was while working with this firm in 1962 that Cox's architectural talents were recognised by Edward Alan Hunt who was at the time commencing proceedings in the Equity Court, on behalf of the Presbyterian Church, for the use of the C.B. Alexander Trust. This eventuated after a visit by Hunt, to the home of Philip's father, Ron Cox. Philip's sister, Judith, was married to Edward Alan Hunt's son, David. Hunt was notably impressed by Philip's final year design project for an art gallery, and assured Cox that he would be able to offer him a commission in the near future. The confirmation of the commission to Philip Cox from the Presbyterian Church to design the two colleges, Leppington and Tocal, materialised whilst he was still working with Figgis and Jefferson, and the initial intention was that Philip would continue with the project in association with Figgis and Jefferson. An initial sketch design for the "Emerald Hills" project, which was intended to be a country retreat for 40 adolescent boys who had committed juvenile offences, was completed by Cox in late 1962. The drawings bear the title 'Figgis and Jefferson and Philip Cox, Architects in Association, 36 Alfred Street, Milson's Point'. The buildings are indicated on the elevations more by means of the shadows cast than by line work, a style of drawing which Cox retained throughout his early career.

However, Cox long realising that there were philosophical differences, parted the association, establishing Philip Cox and Associates and working solitary on the project in the back of a terrace at 68 Blues Point Road that he and his university friends, Louise Gowing, Philip Atkin, and David Gray, had jointly purchased in 1962, but were obliged to let to cover repayments. Through retained connections with Bruce Rickard, Philip Cox was introduced to Ian McKay and shortly after McKay leased part of the terrace, relocating from the premises he had shared with Bruce Rickard in Phillip Street, Sydney, since 1957. The move was fortuitous. Cox, realising the need for a partner with a greater level of construction experience to make the venture possible, and sharing common architectural interests with McKay, an architect of nearly a decade of experience, the association of the two was inevitable. Both were keenly interested in the Australian landscape and its vernacular buildings, and both admired the architecture of Frank Lloyd Wright, as did many emerging architects in Sydney at the time, for its fundamental principles, celebration of form and structure, textural qualities of natural materials, and the close relationship between the interior of a building and its setting. To these shared interests were added McKay's fascination with Eastern mysticism and architecture, particularly that of Japan, which was to strengthen over the period of their association.

Born 23 September 1934, Ian David McKay grew up on a bush property near Coonabarabran, NSW, the son of a farmer and stock and station agent. His grandfather, Ronald Thomas McKay, was a hydraulic engineer who was involved in the Snowy Mountains scheme and was a strong influence, as McKay recalls, for his innate understanding of mechanics and structure. Ian McKay enrolled in the founding year of architecture at the New South Wales University of Technology, Kensington in 1949, and graduated in 1954. One of his first lecturers was Myles Dunphy, whose knowledge of architectural history and understanding of structure including his ability to draw a large scale cross section of Chartres Cathedral in chalk on the blackboard, as well as his avid interest in conservation, of the Australian landscape, was a lasting source of inspiration. Following graduation, Ian McKay travelled overseas to Europe and Asia, attending the international architecture congress on urbanism, CIAM X, in Dubrovnik, returning to Sydney in 1956. After establishing his own practice he shared an office, with Bruce Rickard, from 1957 through to 1962. Rickard had graduated in the same year as McKay, but had spent several years abroad undertaking post-graduate including landscape architecture in Pennsylvania, before returning in 1957 having been deeply impressed by the work of Frank Lloyd Wright. Through his interest in Japanese architecture, he became associated with Muller, Bert Read and Adrian Snodgrass. McKay quickly became one of a number of emerging architects working on Sydney's North Shore. By 1962, in just over five years in practice, McKay's work displayed both sensitivity to context, flexibility and dynamism in the robust use of natural materials and bold forms that explored the structural and textural properties of materials. Whilst the influence of Frank Lloyd Wright is apparent in his works in this period including several houses, in the fluidity of planning incorporating bushland settings and the use of natural timber offset against robust brickwork to heighten their textural qualities, his work was not as derivative of Wright's work as was Rickard's. At the Hill House, Cootamundra, he explored the structural possibilities of preformed plywood, and offset its textural qualities with reinforced concrete. His design of the multi-storey experimental vertical shopping block intended solely for women's retail "Lasade" at 70 Castlereagh Street, Sydney, for which he received the "10 Best Building Award" in 1961, offset glazed and pressed bronze panels in a curtain wall facade with solid vertical bands of acid etched, precast concrete panels.

Work first commenced on the Emerald Hills project. The construction drawings for Emerald Hill are entitled as Ian McKay and Philip Cox, Architects in Association, 68 Blues Point Road, North Sydney and dated January 1963. The design incorporated a series of pavilions arranged along a colonnade to form a series of courtyard spaces around the nineteenth century rural residence "Emerald Hills" which was to be restored as the warden's residence. Each of the pavilions each utilised low pitched roof forms that reinterpreted forms common in traditional farm buildings particularly skillion roofs that sailed above the lower scale colonnades to provide clerestory skylight. A central bell tower provided a focus to the complex and relieving verticality to the long colonnades and low pitched roofscape, with the advantage that it was climbable. A limited palette of material was maintained throughout. Recycled second-hand bricks were laid in enlarged mortar beds of an ochre colour and the joints struck flush to enhance the sense of solidity, and the roof structure consisted of exposed rough sawn timbers. It was an intention that the architecture was to be domestic rather than institutional in character, drawing inspiration from the rural residence on the site. Their immediate client for the project was the Reverend Douglas Cole of the Presbyterian Social Services Department. Cole maintained a strong interest in ecclesiastical art and architecture as well as the sociological aspects in the rehabilitation of youths in the court system. Much discussion and effort was therefore centred on architectural solutions that would promote 'individuality, identity and self-esteem, whilst ensuring that the boys could be part of the college community. It was this aspect of the project that keenly interested McKay, and for which he developed a T-arrangement whereby bedroom accommodation was arranged around courtyards, and each room provided sleeping alcoves for three boys arranged around a common space. McKay and Cox designed much of the furniture including the refectory dining table and chairs, lighting fittings, and signage.

The 'Emerald Hills' project was awarded the Sir John Sulman Medal for Outstanding Architecture by the Royal Australian Institute of Architects, the year of its completion, 1963. Peter Johnson, one of the jurors, reported in the Sydney Morning Herald as "the achievement of architectural values which derived form a deep concern for people who use the building. It fits naturally into the undulating countryside and the simple materials used — here brick and natural timber — show a sincere and unaffected approach to design its character which is unselfconsciously Australian". Freeland credited the 1963 award of the Sulman with legitimising the Sydney School as more than a regional residential style, writing 'Initiated by a small coterie of Sydney architects, the style was impelled into prominence when the Sulman was made to the Presbyterian's Church's Leppington Agricultural College designed by McKay and Cox'.

=== Tocal College ===
The opportunity to further develop the ideas explored at Emerald Hills on a grander scale followed soon after with the development of the design for the college at Tocal, which was to be designed as a specialist college for 160 boys and staff on a fully operational farm. The fundamental requirements of the residential college at Tocal were complex and ranged from repetitive sleeping areas to the special use buildings such as a multi-purpose hall, chapel, dining room and kitchen complex for 120 students, residential accommodation for 60 students and associated common room and reading rooms, staff accommodation, classroom accommodation and laboratories, sporting facilities, and outbuildings for piggeries, dairy and poultry, bull pens, barns and stables.

An established architect-client relationship, a larger scale of project, a more complex brief, and an expansive site incorporating a colonial homestead complex set within a spectacular regional landscape, provided the two architects with greater opportunities than at Emerald Hills to explore an architectural language derived from a response to the unique site. Ian McKay and Philip Cox were present at the first meeting of the College Council when the site of the college was chosen. Cox describes their first impressions: "The site on the crest of the hill overlooking the Paterson Valley was an inspiring one. Tocal is one of the loveliest of settings. It was with excitement and expectation that we wandered around the stone and timber outbuildings; these were some of the best we had ever seen, and were constantly a source for architectural thinking behind Tocal". The array of stone and timber farm buildings, barns, stables, woolsheds and pens, laid out around the Georgian homestead formed a village environment, suggesting an array of more intimate spaces to discover and framing dramatic views over the valley.

It was the express wish of the benefactor, Charles Boyd Alexander, that the college be situated somewhere on the spur running parallel to the Tocal Road. The reason for this was this spur was the least valuable farming land but afforded fine views over the Paterson River and Webber's Creek valleys and consequently over much of the 2,000 hectare property. The site that Cox and McKay initially selected was at the top of this north facing spur. In the initial sketch design the college buildings were symmetrically arranged around a traditional enclosed cloistered quadrangle comprising quartered parterres with the chapel forming the four side isolating itself from the surrounding farm and the Tocal homestead complex, although the axial relationship with the homestead on the opposing hill was by this time firmly established.

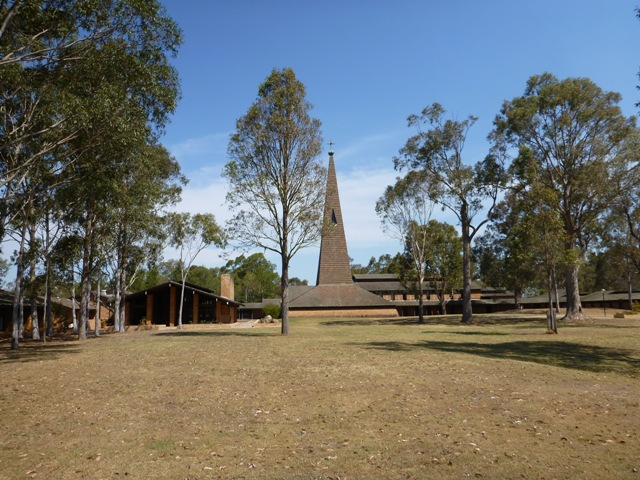
Exterior view of Tocal College

The scheme, as it evolved, became far more responsive to its unique setting, drawing greater inspiration from the "village environment" of the historic homestead complex, and closely integrated with the surrounding landscape. The formal enclosed quadrangle evolved into an open sided quadrangle that embraced the views over the Georgian homestead complex and its encircling lagoon. The location of the college was shifted northwards and lower on the ridge, in order to create a direct visual relationship with the Tocal Homestead complex and its meandering lagoons. At the same time, the revised location enabled the incorporation into the quadrangle of a fine copse of existing trees, and was closer to the agricultural facilities, such as the dairy, poultry yards and the piggery located on the eastern side of Tocal Road near the river. The axial relationship with the homestead was retained but relaxed, as indicated on the final Regional Plan. The evolved scheme was consequently a unique response to its setting and far more dynamic. It also allowed for loose extendable planning along the eastern and western wings, with each of the main functional elements grouped around its own courtyard, echoing the greater quadrangle.

The amplification of the village environment of the Tocal homestead complex, the clarity of structural expression and the use of vernacular materials, locally sourced and in a natural state were the fundamental principles for the design of the college. Cox explains: "Ian and I were resolved that in building this college we were bound to create a tradition that could last for centuries. Timber, brick and clay tiles were to be the vocabulary. No nonsense, no frills; pure structure. The buildings were to merge with the landscape; a complete marriage". One of the more important inspirations for the vocabulary of the buildings was to be the barn designed by Edmund Blacket, with its gothic like tracery of exposed timber structure, that Cox dubbed "the cathedral of barns". Cox later wrote: 'Most impressive was the uncomplicated way the buildings expressed every piece of structure allowing the anatomy to be clearly legible. There was a dignity here similar to the gothic buildings in Europe where the structural forces within are revealed and traced throughout. These buildings reinforced our belief that the way ahead in architecture was to continue this tradition while employing more recent technologies and developing new forms and strategies'. Throughout the design of the project these first responses and the initial vision were a constant reference point, with the result that the architects achieved a high level of integrity in the execution of the original design concept.

Ian McKay and Cox worked seamlessly together throughout the entire project, almost always in agreement on even the most smallest of details and almost always arriving at the same opinion or conclusion for every decision The only reason that their tasks on the project were divided, was due to time constraints, as the college was planned for the first student intake commencing January 1965. The strength of Cox's relationship with E A Hunt was such that it was more practical for Cox to focus on the main hall, whilst McKay had greater involvement with the chapel. The square plan form of the Chapel reflected the Presbyterian ideals of austerity and simplicity, and limitation of symbolic and ritualistic references. The altar tapestry provides the only biblical reference, depicting a passage from the Old Testament Isaiah. The incorporation of the vertical spire was outside the scope of the brief, but both McKay and Cox considered it a necessary vertical focus to the complex as well as a regional landmark. The inspiration for Cox's design of the hall was the barn of the Tocal Homestead designed by Edmund Blacket in 1867. This barn, dubbed by Cox as "the cathedral of barns" for its tracery of exposed structural timbers, of king post trusses supported by adzed poles and brackets shaped from tree roots, and closely spaced battens supporting the shingled roofing.

As with the "Emerald Hills", McKay and Cox designed much more than just the buildings, including furniture such as the Dining Room's refectory tables and chairs, the lectern, the communion table and chairs of the chapel, the lighting fittings, fixtures, the commemorative plaques, and signage. The practice expanded in reputation and with employees, including Bob Hooper, Alan Ray and Roy Thistleton, and later Andrzej Ceprinski and Andrew Metcalfe. Both Cox and McKay acknowledge the work of Ceprinski whose enthusiasm, determination and his immense skill at drawing was as invaluable asset. The intensity and zealousness of the period and the challenges and difficulties entailed in a large scale project that was innovative in Australia, both in terms of its design and its construction. The drawings retained within the NSW State Library Pictures Collections, File Nos PXD 790/449a-551, entitled "C B Alexander Agricultural College, Tocal, Cox Richardson Architects & Planners: selected works, 1967-1979, Architectural and Technical Drawings", bear the initials of Cox, McKay, Ceprinski and others. Although the set of drawings is incomplete, their finely execution in ink and pencil, and their level of detail, is testament to the level of commitment to resolution of detail, the skill and the care of the architects involved.

The architects' working drawings were approved in November, 1963. The contract to build the college was awarded to Gardiner Constructions Pty Ltd of Newcastle in January 1964 and the first sod was turned for the start of the work on the main contract on 31 January 1964. McKay and Cox considered it essential to the design of the college to exploit skills and materials locally available, and they maintained at all times a close involvement and oversight of the construction of the college, from the preliminary selection of trees prior to felling and bricks through to the final detailing of furniture, fixtures, finishes, light fittings, landscaping, hardware and signage. Cox and McKay even wove the leather webbing for the chapel chairs and designed an alphabetic font for the chapel's commemorative plaque.

The architects investigated the availability of bricks of a texture and colour approximating the sandstock bricks utilised in the construction of the Victorian buildings in the Paterson valley. The bricks, both for the walls and the paving, were fired in traditional catenary shaped kilns at a number of local brickworks as the capacity of each was limited for such a volume of brick required. Maitland is a town renowned for its clay seams and its historic brickworks, now only one remaining. The process produced a high degree of clinkers. Cox recounts the initial dismay of the client in utilising all bricks, including chipped bricks and clinkers traditionally rejected, and the use of thick mortar beds of bush sand with joints struck flush, that emulated the rough masonry of the Tocal farm buildings and achieved a sense of solidity rather than integral units. The stone keystones above every arched brick opening replicate the shape of the keystone above the entrance to the homestead's stone barn constructed 1830. The roof tiles were initially proposed to be terracotta shingles but the cost was prohibitive and Swiss pattern terracotta tiles were finally installed.

The emphasis on timber craftsmanship derived from traditional wood crafting methods utilised in the construction of rudimentary Australian rural buildings, required the sourcing of skills and materials no longer easily acquired on the scale required. Most of the structural timbers were to be hardwoods sourced within the region, ironbark, Brushbox and Tallowwood. Joinery timbers for the Chapel chairs was also locally available, although the timber for the Dining Room refectory furniture was sourced from elsewhere. The extensive lengths and cross sectional dimensions that presented a particular challenge, even at the time. Local people "bushies" skilled with the broadaxe and adze, and carpenters versant with traditional jointing methods were sourced. All timbers were brought to the site directly from felling in the forest, where they were barked, de-sapped and line dressed. Both McKay and Cox recall that the Tallowwood tree for the king pole of the chapel's spire was selected from a Barrington Tops forest by McKay in conjunction with a local miller, the tree felled and brought to the site, where it was barked, roughed squared (or hewn) with a broadaxe and laid on trestles such that the central axis was horizontal. The rough squared trunk was turned every day for several months to ensure even seasoning, so that it its central axis would be straight. McKay recounts that one day it developed a slight bow, and astoundingly, the tree was straightened through releasing the tension on the outer curve of the trunk with a single powerful blow of a broadaxe. After this seasoning process, the trunk was adzed into its final shape. Similarly the adzing of over fifty Brushbox trunks to form the colonnade pillars was also undertaken on site by local woodworkers, as too was the construction of the bolsters, or brackets, supporting the roof of the main hall. Each bolster weighed 1 tonne, and comprised three pieces of ironbark that were first shaped and dressed with a broadaxe, before being morticed and tenoned together, and finally dressed with an adze. Although technologically the use of traditional methods of construction demonstrates a return to the carpentry and bricklaying of the colonial era of the Tocal homestead, it was an intellectual and emotionally based departure. Roger Pegrum elaborates: "Joinery details at Tocal celebrate the skills of those who built a century and a half ago without the benefit of electric saws and routers. Rafters sit squarely on beams, which are cut neatly into posts: Struts are halved over purlins; and the beautiful tusk tenon survives in a world just discovering the convenience of punched steel connectors". Both Cox and McKay explain that the knowledge and skills required to effectively craft timber using traditional tools and methods, and the lengths of timber in the cross sections required, are no longer available. As well, structural statutory codes and standards are less flexible and almost would certainly now prohibit the suspended king pole of the chapel.

Norman & Addicoat and Taylor Thomson Whitting were the consulting hydraulic and civil respectively but specialist structural advice for the timber components of the project was provided by Professor Stan Shaw from the University of New South Wales. The architects undertook most of the structural design themselves, with the final calculations and certification provided by Shaw. This exemplifies the interest of the architects in structure and the role that structural expression played in the spatial design. The design of the chapel spire presented the most challenging of structural problems, the resolution of which required a unique jointing system utilising exposed stainless steel shear connector plates to connect the halved trusses to the king pole. A concrete ring beam was required to take the thrust of the spire, which was greatest at the four corners of the chapel. McKay's earlier experimentations with the expressive qualities of reinforced concrete in the late fifties and early sixties provided the necessary understanding for integrating a contemporary material with timber that has been crafted using time honoured techniques. Cox recalls that the chapel's spire was so structurally unique incorporating a large scale timber structural joint, beyond the scope of calculations, that Shaw was never completely certain that the king pole would withstand being suspended over a void. Prior to any costing undertaken by a quantity surveyor, the architects undertook their own estimations of the first main contract works, in the order of 300,000 pounds.

Philip Cox advised the commission of Margaret Grafton for the chapel's altar tapestry. Made of hand spun wool dyed with natural dyes, it took 18 months to complete. This was the first Australian tapestry to be commissioned by an architect for a site specific project and was instrumental in establishing the incorporation of artworks into large scale projects as common practise.

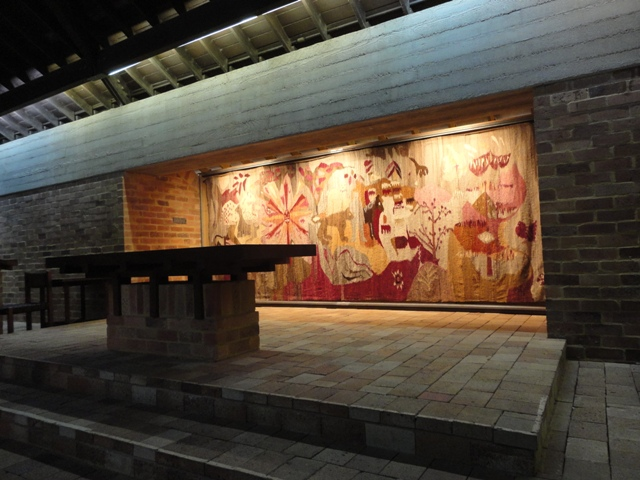
Alter and tapestry by Margaret Grafton

The first stage was completed in time for the first intake of fifteen Foundation students for the first term beginning 26 January 1965. One of these was Malcolm Henderson, who photographically recorded the construction of the college and retains the collection of slides.

The college was opened on 5 November 1965 by Prime Minister of Australia Robert Menzies.

== Architecture awards and recognition ==
The college, even during its construction, attracted much interest from the architectural profession. Geoffrey Bawa visited the complex in 1965, remarking that it was 'the only building in Australia that he admired'. However, not all shared similar views. The principles demonstrated, including the application of craftsmanship, the emphasis on clarity of structural expression, the use of locally derived forms and locally sourced materials, passive climate control, and loose extendable planning and the integration of the built form with the landscape, were an anathema to the prevailing modernist, international, institutional architecture of its time. Robin Boyd, an emerging architectural critic, considered the project far too retrospective and nostalgic.

The college was critically acclaimed in numerous written publications by architectural and structural critics, including those by J.M. Freeland and Jennifer Taylor and continues to revered as one of the most important late twentieth century works in Australia, being one of the entries in the Docomomo world survey and was one of the first 20 buildings to be considered under the modernism theme in Australia. It is noted as being an exemplary example of a group of buildings referred to in Apperly's' Identifying Australian Architecture as illustrating late twentieth century Sydney regionalist architecture applied to a large scale non residential project, as well as Freeland Architecture in Australia follows on from his preceding accreditation that the award of the 1963 Sulman Medal to Cox and McKay for the Emerald Hills project impelled the Sydney School into prominence, further accredits the receipt of both the Sulman and Blacket Awards in 1965 to Tocal College, along with the award of the 1964 Sulman Medal to Woolley for the design of Goldstein Hall, as 'the idiom was established'. Freeland summates the qualities represented as 'Its underlying qualities were timeless but its appearance was uniquely mid twentieth century. In its development, application and appropriateness it was thoroughly and distinctly Australian. The construction of the buildings, direct, simple and thoughtful, had a crafted quality and was often exposed as a powerful part of the design. Because it contained much that was Australian generated it seemed to hold a promise that after a century and a quarter Australian architecture might at last be going Australian'.

The first Principal was the Reverend Colin Ford, B.SC. Edward Alan Hunt MBE was the first Chairman of the College Council and remained in that office until the handing over to the state government in 1969, after which he continued his involvement with the college until his death in 1982. In acknowledgement of his contribution, his ashes lie in the college chapel. Hunt's son David, and his wife Judy, Philip Cox's sister, have retained association with Tocal and assist in raising funds for conservation works to the buildings. The Presbyterian Church managed the college until 1970 after which it was transferred to the NSW Department of Agriculture as the CB Alexander Agricultural College, Tocal, after the passing of the C.B. Alexander Foundation Act in 1969. The extent of the Tocal property has been increased to the current 2,200 hectares through various land purchases since the college commenced including Athcourt Farm, Glendarra, Bona Vista, Dunnings Hill, Clements Farm and Numeralla. In 1972, the first female students were admitted. Tocal is now operated by the NSW Department of Primary Industries. The Tocal Field Days are regarded as the Hunter Valley's premier agricultural event as well as being a popular regional social attraction.

Ian McKay and Philip Cox were awarded the 1965 Sir John Sulman Medal for Outstanding Architecture and later in 1965, the Blacket Award, by the Royal Australian Institute of Architects (New South Wales Chapter).

Cox and McKay later received the 'Building of the Decade Award' from Lend Lease in 2005.

In 2014 Tocal College was awarded the New South Wales Enduring Architecture Award and the National Award for Enduring Architecture later in the same year by the Australian Institute of Architects.

In 2015 the National Trust of Australia (NSW) classified the Tocal College CB Alexander Campus on their Country Register.

== Description ==
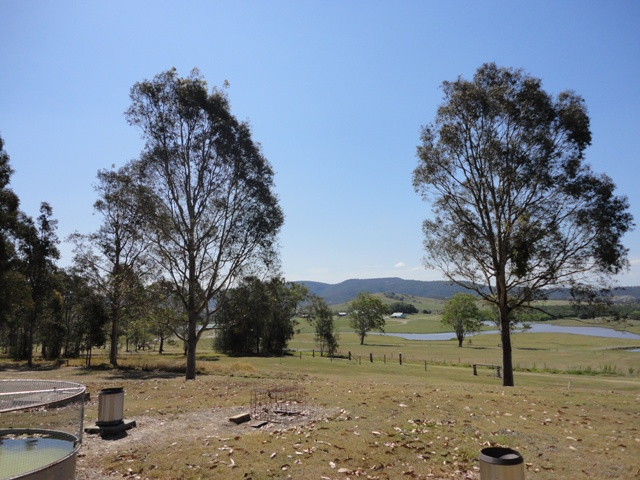
View from the weather station towards the Tocal Homestead

Tocal College — C.B. Alexander Campus is the collection of buildings constructed in 1965 to a design by Cox and McKay. It includes the landscaping which is open and sparsely treed and the open landscape between the buildings and Tocal Homestead. The movable collection is limited to the following items: chapel tapestry, chapel chairs, chapel organ, tables and benches in dining room and conference room, padded leather chairs and small square occasional tables.

The Tocal farm estate comprises 2,200 hectares in the Hunter Valley region of NSW, approximately 15 kilometres north of Maitland. The estate extends along the valley floor at the confluence of the Paterson River and Webber's Creek, encircled by watershed ranges to the northwest and northeast, forming a remarkably beautiful contained setting.

The college forms part of the Tocal farm estate, and is set on a long low north facing ridge that overlooks the Paterson River and the lower ridge of the Tocal Homestead complex, the two separated by an extensive meandering lagoon. The first impression of the college via glimpses from Tocal Road through stands of Spotted Gums, is of a long low complex straddled along the ridge; of massive, shielding walls of sandstone coloured brickwork, deeply folded into narrow window openings thrown into deep shadow, and above which rises a spire of unexpected height. The college entrance road winds up the ridge before straightening along the central axis that extends through the entrance vestibule and the chapel's spire. The broad roof of the entrance vestibule sweeps low over the stepped entrance platform and from this unassuming arrival point one is led into a large open sided quadrangle where the spatial qualities and the architecture of the entire complex unfolds.

The main campus buildings are arranged around a cloistered quadrangle, but European monastic references are tempered by its loose, open sided, formation. The northern side of the quadrangle is ingeniously left open to direct the eye northwards to the colonial Tocal Homestead on the hill opposite, and to embrace the broader landscape setting, creating one unified and unique composition, encompassing College, Homestead and the Paterson valley setting. The loose fit of the college buildings is reminiscent of Australian farm complexes, importantly the Tocal Homestead, whereby vistas to the surrounding landscape are framed by the array of farm structures. Focus on the quadrangle is retained, and intensified, by the central placement of the college chapel with its dramatic spire, and by the encircling colonnades that serve as the primary circulation between the main campus buildings, providing shade and shelter from conditions on the exposed ridge. The central placement of the chapel divides the quadrangle into two, more intimate, courtyard spaces, each assuming a different character through modelling of the ground plane.

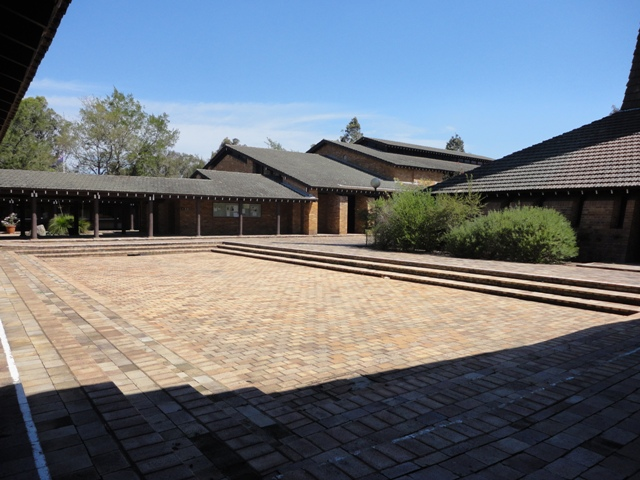
Courtyard between the dining hall, administration and chapel

The quadrangle is unified by the simple repetition of forms and structure, enhanced by the play of light and shadow, and by a limited palette of locally sourced materials; brick, timber, and terracotta tile, all chosen for their textural qualities. The rendition is reminiscent of traditional Japanese architecture, yet the selection of materials and their crafting is distinctly derived from local rural traditions. The hovering, low pitched, stepped roof planes of the campus buildings are swept low over the colonnades supported at their perimeter by robust posts of raw adzed Brushbox baulks, supported on sandstone plinths and girt by punched steel collar straps that add to the textual effect. Rubble drains, used in lieu of gutters, add texture to the ground plane. Copper gutters are only included where necessary over entrances and the like. A modular grid of 2,700mm (nine feet, zero inches) applied throughout orders the placement of structure and space. The repetition of colonnade posts, exposed projecting rafters, paired above each post, their ends painted white in traditional Japanese fashion, establishes a powerful unifying rhythm, intensified by the dark shadows cast on the ochre coloured pavement and walls. The unglazed terracotta tiled roofs have acquired a green tone of algae almost a verdigris colour that further adds to the rustic effect. Spaces between the main quadrangle buildings lead to smaller courtyards that are treated in the same manner.

The brickwork throughout the college is modelled to intensify its visual strength. Walls are buttressed, battered, and folded into reveals being supported at horizontal folds by concealed permanent formwork of reinforced concrete, openings are narrow and glass is deeply recessed to provide shade. The selection of light earth toned, kiln fired bricks throughout, set in unusually thick, flush struck, beds of ochre coloured mortar, enhances the sense of solidity and references the underground brick silos, the stables and barns of the Tocal Homestead, as well as Webber's original cottage of 1822. The brickwork is purposefully rough to confirm the rustic and robust nature of the buildings, every clinker or chipped brick utilised. Similar coloured kiln fired bricks are used as paving throughout the colonnades and the interiors of the buildings, and the ground plane is modelled with sunken terraces, such that the walls appear to rise out of the earth. Door openings are spanned by pointed arches locked by keystones of honed sandstone, the shape of the keystones reminiscent of the Tocal stone barn of 1830.

The common palette of materials, of brick, timber and terracotta tile, and the extensive colonnades connecting the main campus buildings make for a unified complex but within this uniformity there are marked contrasts of architectural expression. Each of the main buildings flanking the quadrangle is necessarily varied in design by its function, maintaining an individual character and structure expression. Structural expression and the textural qualities of exposed natural finishes, form the major role in defining the character of each space. The timber structure is expressed and robust, referencing the timber woolsheds, barns and tank stands of the Tocal Homestead, yet the ingenuity of some of the college timber structures is such that commonplace structural terminology is not always applicable. Of these, the Chapel and the Edward Alan Hunt Hall, are structurally the most remarkable and innovative, and exhibit the highest level of brick and timber craftsmanship.

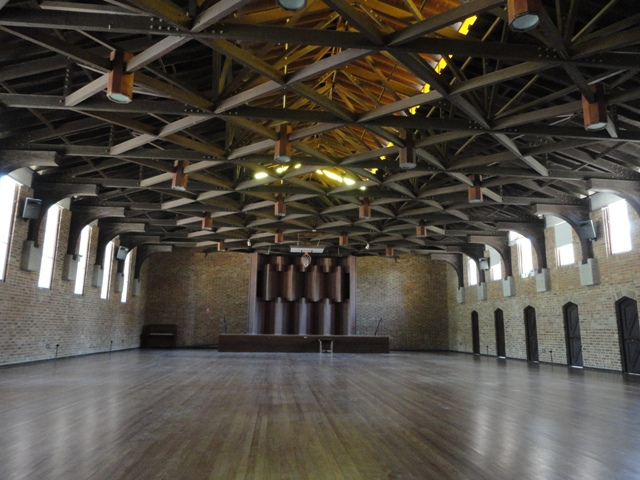
Interior of the main hall

The chapel, is pivotal to the design of the complex; cradled within the quadrangle, and centred on the north south axis that runs through the centre of the main entrance and the quadrangle in a northerly direction to the original Tocal homestead building. The building is square in plan with battered brick walls supporting a low clerestory above which a spire that rises a further 30 metres in height, its apex surmounted by a two-metre-high (6.6-foot) cast stainless steel cross. The dramatic form of the chapel's spire is not only a focal point to the college, but also a landmark that visually links the college complex with the Tocal Homestead and the surrounding Tocal farm estate. In contrast to the lofty steeple, the low massive battered brick walls of the chapel enclose a cave like interior. The level of natural light to the interior is minimal, channelled through deeply recessed and narrow openings confined to the east and west aisles, and its colour rendered by ochre coloured glazing. Four discreet shafts of light reveal the intricate tracery of roof timbers from small gablets high on the steeple. Materials are left in their natural state; brick walls left as exposed face, floors of brick paving, off-form concrete using undressed timber boarding, and roof framing timbers exposed to view beneath ceilings of timber boarding. Despite the simplicity of the square plan form, the design of both the brickwork and the timber structure is highly complex and explores timber technology beyond that of the vernacular Tocal buildings. From the low battered external walls spring brick buttresses that brace a massive concrete ring beam spanning between an inner line of brick pillars. These pillars play a dual role in forming side aisles on the eastern and western sides of the interior. From the four corners of the ring beam spring the low raked intercepting timber trusses that support both the clerestory roof framing and the massive king post of the spire. Both the trusses and the king pole are made from Tallowwood (Eucalyptus microcorys) sourced from forests within the locality, and barked, de-sapped and line dressed on site. The king post is composed of three lengths, each diminishing in thickness from an initial 450mm, as it ascends suspended over the chapel, over 30 metres in height. The load of the pole is transferred to the trusses by stainless steel shear plates sleeved between the laminated sections that compose the chords of each truss. Attention to detail extended to every aspect of the interior finishes and the construction: each concrete roof tile of the spire was double wired and further fastened to the timber battens with two brass screws. The raw medieval character of the chapel's interior is reinforced by the furniture and furnishings specifically designed for the space, including the face brick lectern and communion table, and the Blackwood (Acacia melanoxlyon) framed chairs with woven leather webbing designed by Cox and McKay, the organ, and the tapestry hung behind the altar that depicts a passage from the Old Testament Isaiah. Created by Margaret Grafton, and woven of hand spun wool dyed with natural dyes, its warm colours and soft texture contrast with the raw Spartan interior. The marble commemorative tablet, designed by the architects, rests directly beneath the king post.

The main hall, named after Edward Alan Hunt, is located to the western side of the main entrance and was designed as a multifunctional space, for theatre, badminton, basketball, gymnastics and other purposes. For this reason it has a suspended timber floor of Brushbox rather than brick pavement utilised elsewhere in the common campus buildings. The inspiration for the Hall was the barn of the Tocal Homestead designed by Edmund Blacket in 1867. This barn, dubbed by Cox as "the cathedral of barns" for its tracery of exposed structural timbers, of king post trusses supported by adzed poles and brackets shaped from tree roots, and closely spaced battens supporting the shingled roofing. The enclosing walls of the hall are articulated by faceted buttresses, between which window and door openings are cradled, achieving massive depth. In the tradition of medieval gothic churches, the roof trusses are supported by enormous brackets, each comprising three pieces of adzed ironbark mortised together. The brackets rest on off-form concrete corbels, that project from the brick work wall behind. From the bottom chord of each truss radiate a spray of struts supporting intermediary rafters, reminiscent of Aalto's Säynätsalo Town Hall. In the same plane as the bottom chord of each truss is a dia-grid that supports cylindrical timber lined light fittings. The faceted backdrop of the hall stage is constructed of blackbutt (Eucalyptus pilularis).

The Dining Room complex is located at the northern end of the eastern arm of the quadrangle separated from the chapel by a sunken courtyard. The interior of the Dining Room consists of a similar sunken brick paved floor, focused on a broad brick fireplace spanned by a deep off-form concrete beam. The roof structure is a simpler version of the E. A. Hunt Hall, consisting of roof trusses, from the bottom chord of which radiate a spray of struts supporting inter-mediatory rafters. The refectory style tables and seating benches and the light fittings, designed by the architects, are similar to their previous design for the dining room at Emerald Hills. The Kitchen is located adjacent to the Dining Room and opens onto a service courtyard.

The student accommodation forms the western side of the main quadrangle. The bedrooms are paired and arranged in long rows, accessed from the internal facing colonnades. Each row is linked by cross colonnades so as to enclose a series of intimate courtyards and frame glimpses of the broader landscape of the farm beyond. The design is additive, with potential for additional blocks should they be required in the future. Each row is covered by a simple skillion roof allowing the inclusion of clerestory windows for natural lighting and ventilation, while maintaining privacy. As elsewhere, the brickwork is folded inwards to form deeply recessed openings providing both sun shading and privacy.

The classrooms complex and administrative offices are located at the southern end of the eastern arm of the quadrangle separated from the entrance vestibule by an intimate courtyard. A separate entrance, a later addition, is marked by a tower form again reminiscent of Aalto's Saynatsalo Town Hall gives direct access to the Classrooms from the entrance driveway.

The landscape of the campus reinforces the local setting and incorporates original scattered stands of Spotted Gum (Corymba maculata) with planted stands of She-Oak or Forest Oak (Allocasuarina torulosa), and under plantings of xanthorrhoeas, grevilleas and callistemons.

=== Condition ===
The college buildings were reported to be in very good and highly intact condition as at 27 September 2012.

The complex is highly intact. The loose extendable nature of the original planning of the college purposefully anticipated the need for future additional residential rooms and teaching facilities, particularly the planning of the eastern and western wings. One of the few alterations made to the original construction, is the alteration to the sunken courtyard to the East of the chapel, whereby the original open pavement with ground covers providing margins to the brick pavers has been replaced by a homogeneous brick pavement.

The vision for the buildings was to mature with age and merge with the landscape. The selection of materials, such as hardwood timbers and facebrick, and the design of the buildings that incorporates large roof overhangs, colonnades and deeply recessed openings, provides a high degree of weather protection. The complex has proven to be durable and extremely low maintenance.

=== Modifications and dates ===
- 1967: Student rooms Nos 63–93 constructed, providing accommodation for an additional 30 students. This was designed and supervised by Cox's firm and constructed by F H Crompton and Sons.
- 1974–75: The Crawford Court (SW), Library & Machinery demonstration room were designed and supervised by Cox's firm and constructed by D. F. McCloy.
- 1979: Swimming Pool constructed, and Cox's firm was commissioned to work on the conservation of the Tocal homestead buildings.
- 1987: Conversion of former machinery bay to offices and the creation of McFarlane Court. Completion of the north eastern elements of Crawford Court including substantial extensions to the Library and Computer Room, designed and supervised by Cox's firm, and constructed by D F McCloy.
- 1995: Construction of Glendarra 2 accommodation.
- 1996–97: Construction of the southern elements of McFarlane Court and extensions to far north eastern part of campus, North Court, designed by Eric Martin and Associates and constructed by C & W Construction.
- 1998: Construction of Hunter-Central Rivers Catchment Management Authority offices at Glendarra (the agency was then known as the Hunter Catchment Management. Trust); Designed by Eric Martin and Associates.
- 2010: Extensions to dining room kitchen; construction of residential supervisors' cottage; adaptive re-use of former staff cottages as group accommodation; refurbishment and modification of Glendarra 1 accommodation; adaptive re-use of a dairy shed as a ruminant field laboratory. Designed by Eric Martin and Associates.

== Heritage listing ==
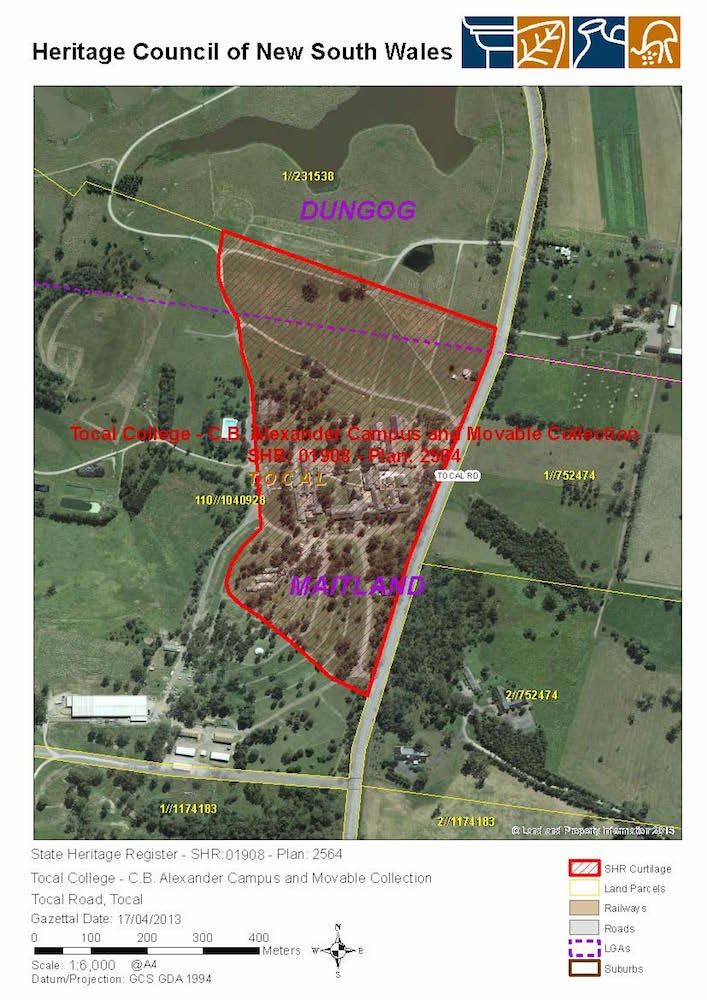
Heritage boundaries

Tocal College — C.B. Alexander Campus represents the historical shift in institutional architecture from one dominated by international modernist trends to one that was more locally based in its ideology.

The architecture of Tocal College applies the design characteristics of the Late Twentieth Century Sydney Regional or Sydney School on an institutional scale. Expressive structural use of robust and enduring materials seamlessly integrated within its landscape setting was a groundbreaking approach to institutional design. The application of these design principles, previously only domestically applied, was to be influential in the history of Australian architecture. These principles established a new architectural approach which rivalled the prevailing institutional architecture which was based in international modernism. The locally based approach through choice of vernacular materials and forms, (such as the language of the Tocal barn) and the environmentally sensitive response to location is credited with being a truly Australian architecture.

The architects of the college, Philip Cox and Ian Mackay, are highly regarded in the architectural profession and the college was an important accomplishment early in their respective careers.

In 1965 Tocal College received the Australian Institute of Architects highest honour, the Sulman Medal, and today is held in very high esteem by the architectural profession for its cultural value as a seminal work of architecture that played a significant role in the direction of Australian architectural practice in the latter half of the twentieth century.

Tocal College is an outstanding example of the Sydney School style of architecture as applied on an institutional scale. Tocal College is historically significant for its association with Tocal Homestead and Tocal Farm which is one of the oldest colonial properties in the Hunter Region and played a significant role in the history of agriculture in New South Wales. Tocal College - C.B. Alexander Campus continues to play a part in the agricultural history of the state by providing agricultural education.

The movable collection was designed to complement the design of the college and contributes to its integrity. The tapestry is a significant art work by renowned Australian textile artist Margaret Grafton and is integral to the aesthetic significance of the chapel interior.

Tocal College — C.B. Alexander Campus was listed on the New South Wales State Heritage Register on 17 April 2013 having satisfied the following criteria.

The place is important in demonstrating the course, or pattern, of cultural or natural history in New South Wales.

Tocal College — C.B. Alexander Campus is located on the lands of the Tocal estate; Tocal Homestead is one of the oldest colonial homesteads in the Hunter Region and played an important role in the development of agriculture over the last 150 years. (Desgrand) Tocal is historically significant as the legacy of Charles Boyd Alexander of the Alexander family, owners of Tocal estate in the 20th century. Tocal College continues the agricultural tradition through provision of agricultural education.

Tocal College — C.B. Alexander Campus represents the historical shift in institutional architecture from one dominated by European Modernist trends to one that was more locally based in its ideology. The college design successfully adapted a previously vernacular approach to a large scale project which was a groundbreaking approach for its time. The high level of craftsmanship, the use of robust and enduring materials applied to institutional buildings was a methodology which was to be influential in the history of Australian architecture. The esteem with which the architecture profession regarded the building was reflected in the award of the prestigious Sir John Sulman Medal in 1965.

The chapel's tapestry was the first Australian tapestry to be commissioned by an architect for a site specific project and was instrumental in establishing the incorporation of art works into large scale projects as common practise. (Desgrand)

The place has a strong or special association with a person, or group of persons, of importance of cultural or natural history of New South Wales's history.

Tocal College — C.B. Alexander Campus was an early work of the Australian architect Philip Cox and is considered the beginning of his architectural career. Cox later played a role in establishing the architectural firm Cox Group.(Desgrand) The college was also a significant commission for the architect Ian McKay. According to DEsgrand, the design reflects McKay's attention to the natural environment and combines the influences of Frank Lloyd Wright and traditional Japanese architecture found in his earlier work, applied here on a larger scale.(Desgrand) The college is linked to Leppington Boys Home (St Andrews Agricultural College) which was built before Tocal and helped secure the C.B. Alexander bequest for Tocal College. The Leppington building received the Sulman Medal in 1963 and was an architectural precursor to the Tocal campus. The college's founder and first chairman was Edward Alan Hunt, a solicitor and Mayor of Parramatta. The tapestry in the chapel was designed by the Australian artist Margret Grafton. Charles Boyd Alexander, who introduced twentieth century mechanised farming practices to Tocal,bequeathed Tocal and other property and assets for the agricultural training of Protestant children.(Desgrand) Sir Robert Menzies officiated at the college's opening in 1965.

The place is important in demonstrating aesthetic characteristics and/or a high degree of creative or technical achievement in New South Wales.

Tocal College — C.B. Alexander Campus is of State significance as an exemplary work of architecture that played an important role in the direction of architecture in Australia. The design of the college demonstrates an unprecedented appreciation of the Australian rural vernacular in its use of bold simple forms, its rigorous expressive use of timber structure and the exploitation of hand crafted timber for its textural qualities.(Desgrand) Whilst the emphasis on structural expression to render space is reminiscent of traditional Japanese architecture and gothic Europe, the work at Tocal was the first major exploration of structural expressionism incorporating an inventive use of locally sourced materials and a high level of craftsmanship derived from local rural traditions previously only associated with the rural vernacular tradition.(Desgrand) The principles demonstrated in the design of the college epitomize the Late Twentieth Century Sydney Regional style or "Sydney School" as it became known, including its loose extendable planning, the integration of the built form with the landscape, the application of craftsmanship, the emphasis on clarity of structural expression, the use of locally derived forms and locally sourced materials, and the emphasis on passive climate control. In the application of these principles to a large scale institutional college, it was instrumental in establishing a new approach to rival the prevailing international modernist institutional architecture of its time. (Desgrand) Architects Philip Cox and Ian MacKay's uniquely Australian response to materials and location and is credited with being the beginnings of a truly Australian architecture. Notable architectural historian, J.M. Freeland, attributes Tocal College with bringing the "thoroughly and distinctly Australian" style into prominence. The movable collection is aesthetically significant as it was specifically designed by the architects to complement the architecture of the college. In particular the chapel tapestry is a significant aesthetic element of the chapel interior. The open sparsely-treed dry landscape is significant in its aesthetic role in defining the spatial arrangement of campus buildings. The open landscape between the college main quadrangle and the Tocal Homestead is also a significant aspect of the setting of the college and was a determining factor in the choice of location of the college and its orientation.

The place has strong or special association with a particular community or cultural group in New South Wales for social, cultural or spiritual reasons.

Tocal College — C.B. Alexander Campus is held in very high esteem by the architectural profession for its cultural value as a seminal work of architecture that played a significant role in the direction of Australian architectural practice in the latter half of the twentieth century. This is evidenced through numerous publications which demonstrate the high esteem of the profession for example: in the 60th Anniversary issue of the Architecture Bulletin November/December 2004, the building was nominated as the 'Building of the Decade' for the 1960s (Degrand) and the DOCOMOMO survey of modernist buildings included Tocal College in their priority list of 20 buildings. Graduates of C.B. Alexander Campus and the local community also have a special association with the place as evidenced by the popularity of the college open days.

The place has potential to yield information that will contribute to an understanding of the cultural or natural history of New South Wales.

Does not satisfy this criterion at a State level.

The place possesses uncommon, rare or endangered aspects of the cultural or natural history of New South Wales.

Does not satisfy this criterion at a State level.

The place is important in demonstrating the principal characteristics of a class of cultural or natural places/environments in New South Wales.

Tocal College — C.B. Alexander Campus is an outstanding example of the Late Twentieth Century Sydney Regional (Sydney School) style of architecture as applied on an institutional scale. The principles commonly demonstrated by the Sydney School including; the application of craftsmanship, the emphasis on clarity of structural expression, the use of locally derived forms and locally sourced materials, passive climate control, and loose extendable planning and the integration of the built form with the landscape, were an anathema to the prevailing modernist, international, institutional architecture of its time. (Desgrand)

== Properties ==
=== Bonavista ===
The first homestead was built in 1820 by James Phillips. 1840 James Phillips created a subdivision of 100 allotments of the north -east part of the estate with this becoming the township of Patterson. In 1904 Moses Smith purchased the property and the surrounding land not sold by 1851. In 1876 Richard Bowker created a new homestead. 1914 it was sold to Henry Harris. In 1974 it was purchased by Tocal. The property has a homestead, shearing shed, dairy, garage and a store shed. It has many restoration over time maintenance (1995), roof replaced (1988), extensive conservation work on the interior (1990), south west downstairs room (2002). In a 2014 report recommended to keep the property as a usable residence and maintain outbuildings.
