= Sydney Baháʼí Temple =

Baháʼí temple in Ingleside, Sydney, Australia

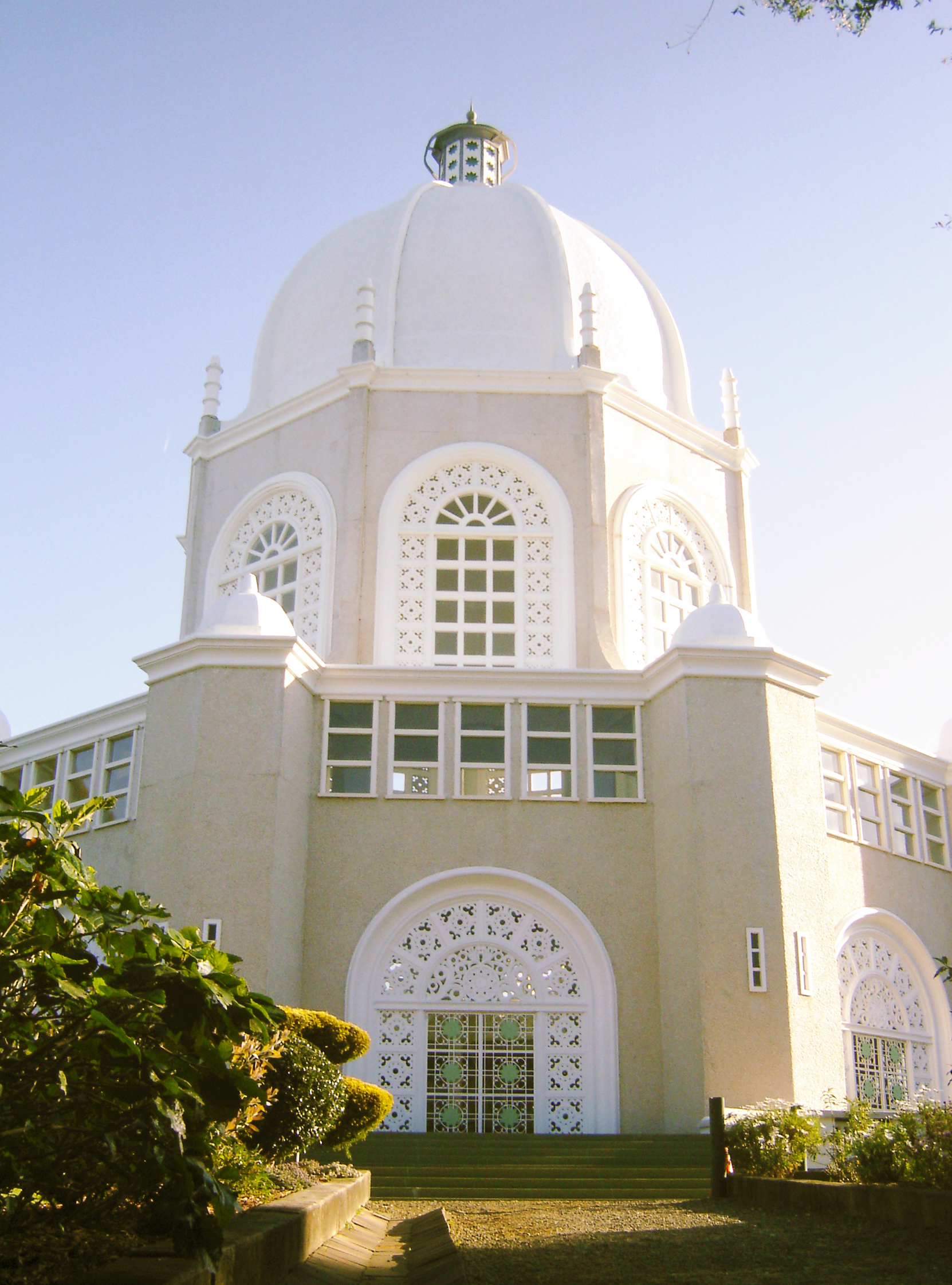

General information
- Type: Baháʼí House of Worship
- Location: Ingleside, Sydney, Australia
- Coordinates: 33.6855°S 151.2587°E
- Completed: 16 September 1961

Height
- Height: 38 metres (125 ft)

Dimensions
- Diameter: 20 metres (66 ft)

Design and construction
- Architect: John Brogan

Other information
- Seating capacity: 600

The Sydney Baháʼí House of Worship or Sydney Baháʼí Temple is situated in Ingleside, a northern suburb of Sydney, Australia. According to Jennifer Taylor, a historian at Sydney University, it is among Sydney's four most significant religious buildings constructed in the twentieth century. It was the world's fourth Baháʼí House of Worship to be constructed, completed in 1961. Shoghi Effendi, head of the Baháʼí Faith when the House of Worship was designed, called it the "Mother Temple of the whole Pacific area" and the "Mother Temple of the Antipodes." Every year, over 20,000 domestic and foreign visitors frequent the House of Worship.

== History ==
In the early 1950s, the Baháʼís of Australia began work to purchase a property for a House of Worship. When the persecution of Baháʼís intensified in Iran in 1955, Shoghi Effendi, then head of the religion, suspended plans for a House of Worship in Tehran and commissioned two others in its place, one in Kampala, Uganda, and the other in Sydney, both designed by Hand of the Cause of God Charles Mason Remey. The property for the temple was acquired in 1956 and construction began in April 1957. On 22 March 1958, a foundation ceremony was held which was attended by Clara Dunn, a Hand of the Cause appointed by Shoghi Effendi who first brought the Baháʼí Faith to Australia in 1920 along with her husband John Hyde Dunn.

The temple was dedicated on 16 and 17 September 1961 by Shoghi Effendi's widow Rúhíyyih Khánum (Mary Maxwell), and international dignitaries then attended a reception hosted by the mayor of Sydney. At this time, the structure's technical features received treatment in engineering and construction journals including Plywood and Products and Construction, while general coverage appeared in The Daily Telegraph, The Daily Mirror, The Sydney Morning Herald, and The Australian Post, among other Australian news outlets. Internationally, the temple was mentioned briefly in sources including The Economist and Time. The total cost of the four-year construction was around £150,000.

In the summer of 1993–1994 and again in 2005–2006, the temple was threatened by nearby bush fires which approached but never reached the temple grounds. In 2011, a week of events was held to mark the temple's fiftieth anniversary, including an interfaith prayer service, a reception attended by dignitaries such as the Premier of New South Wales, and an exhibition featuring children's art on creating a more peaceful world.

== Building and grounds ==
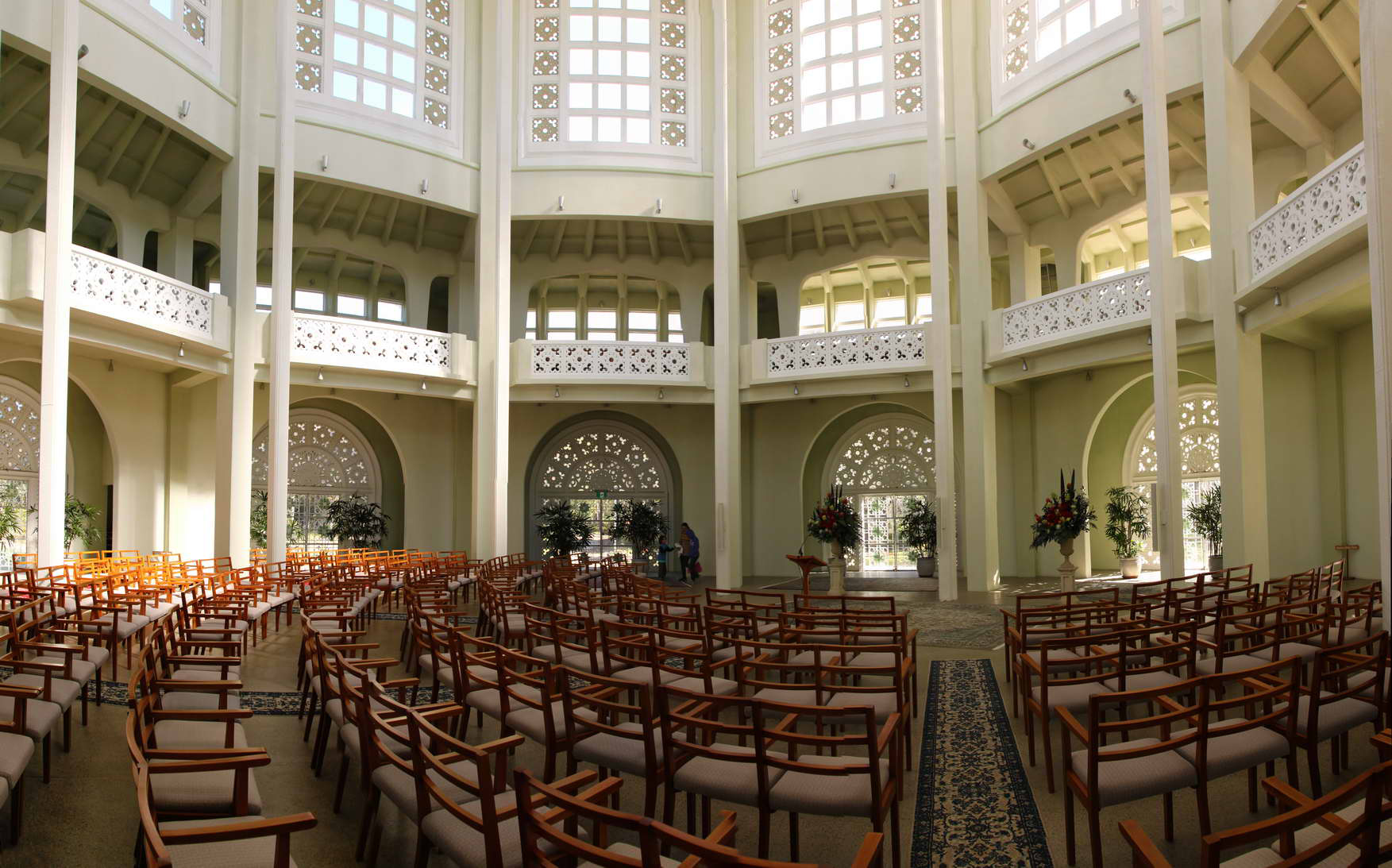
Interior of the Baháʼí House of Worship

On the ground floor of the temple is a main auditorium with seating for six hundred people, encircled by a gallery. From there, nine doors open onto the grounds at equal angles, as in all Baháʼí Houses of Worship, signifying the unity of the world's religions. The second level features windows of Palladian style that illuminate the building's interior. A ribbed dome rises above them, spanning 20 metres horizontally and reaching 38 metres above ground level at its highest point. There is a lantern perched on top of the dome, which was placed there by a helicopter during the construction. Construction materials include crushed quartz, local hardwoods in the interior, and concrete and marble in the dome.

The temple is a highly visible landmark as it occupies the highest point above Sydney's Northern Beaches region, overlooking the Pacific coast at Mona Vale. It is on Mona Vale Road, set in an area of natural bushland included in an Indigenous Protected Area. The surrounding gardens contain a variety of native Australian flora including waratahs, three species of eucalypts, caleyi and other grevillea, acacia, and woody pear. Other amenities located on the site include a visitors' centre, a bookshop, a picnic area, and the administrative offices of the Australian Baháʼí community. When the number of Australian Baháʼís becomes sufficient to sustain them, humanitarian centres for education, welfare, and other purposes will be established around the temple.

== Worship ==
The Baháʼí Faith teaches that a Baháʼí House of Worship should be a space for people of all religions to gather, reflect, and worship. As is the case with all Baháʼí Houses of Worship, anyone may enter the Sydney temple irrespective of religious background, sex, or other distinctions. The sacred writings of not only the Baháʼí Faith but also other religions can be read and/or chanted, regardless of language; on the other hand, reading non-scriptural texts is forbidden, as are delivering sermons or lectures and fundraising. Musical renditions of readings and prayers can be sung by choirs but no musical instruments can be played inside. There is no set pattern for worship services, and ritualistic ceremonies are not permitted.

On Sundays and on Baháʼí Holy Days, public prayer services are held with readings from the sacred texts of various religions and a cappella music sung by the temple choir.

== See also ==
- Lotus Temple
- Santiago Baháʼí Temple
- Baháʼí House of Worship (Wilmette, Illinois)
- Baháʼí teachings
- Prayer in the Baháʼí Faith
- Baháʼí Faith in Oceania
- Tourism in Sydney
- Religion in Australia
