= Baháʼí Faith in Oceania =

Religion of an area

The Baháʼí Faith is a minority religion in all the countries of Oceania. Baháʼí Houses of Worship are present in Australia, Samoa, and Vanuatu, and another is under construction in Papua New Guinea. Malietoa Tanumafili II of Samoa was a follower of the Baháʼí Faith and the first Baháʼí head of state.

== Australia ==
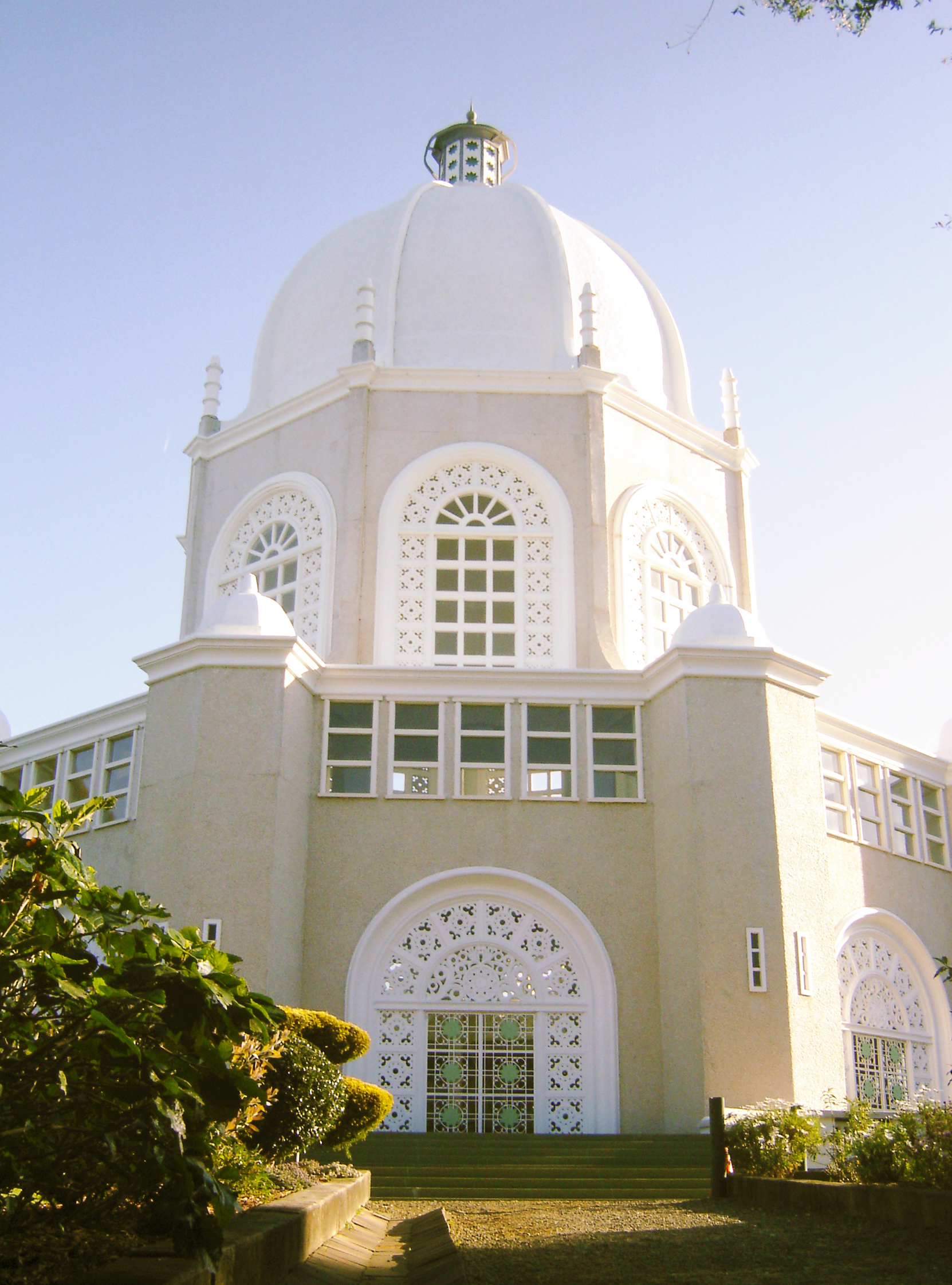
Sydney Baháʼí Temple

The Baháʼí Faith in Australia has a long history beginning with a mention by ʻAbdu'l-Bahá, the son of the founder of the religion, in 1916 following which United Kingdom/American emigrants John and Clara Dunn came to Australia in 1920. They found people willing to convert to the Baháʼí Faith in several cities while further immigrant Baháʼís also arrived. The first Local Spiritual Assembly was elected in Melbourne followed by the first election of the National Spiritual Assembly in 1934.

When persecution of Baháʼís intensified in Iran in 1955, Shoghi Effendi, then head of the religion, suspended plans for a Baháʼí House of Worship in Tehran, and in its place commissioned the Kampala Baháʼí House of Worship and the Sydney Baháʼí Temple. According to Jennifer Taylor, a historian at Sydney University, the latter was among Sydney's four most significant religious buildings constructed in the twentieth century. It was the world's fourth Baháʼí House of Worship to be completed, dedicated in 1961. Shoghi Effendi, head of the Baháʼí Faith when the Sydney Baháʼí Temple was designed, called it the "Mother Temple of the whole Pacific area" and the "Mother Temple of the Antipodes."

Though they had been denied entry in 1948, Iranian Baháʼís began to be admitted in 1973 where persecution again rose. Since the 1980s the Baháʼís of Australia have become involved and spoken out on a number of civic issues – from interfaith initiative such as Soul Food to conferences on indigenous issues and national policies of equal rights and pay for work. The community was counted by census in 2001 to be about 11,000 individuals and includes some well-known people (see Baháʼí Faith in Australia – National exposure.)

== Guam ==
The Baháʼí Faith has been present in Guam for over 50 years. It is part of the National Spiritual Assembly of the Baháʼís of the Northern Mariana Islands, and there are six communities in Guam which have local spiritual assemblies. There is a Baháʼí National Center in Hagåtña.

== Hawaii ==
In 2000, Paul Sjoquist of the National Spiritual Assembly of the Baháʼís of the Hawaiian Islands estimated that there were as many as 1,000 followers in Hawaii.

== Kiribati ==
The only substantial non-Christian population is of the Baháʼí Faith. The Baháʼí Faith in Kiribati begins after 1916 with a mention by ʻAbdu'l-Bahá, then head of the religion, that Baháʼís should take the religion to the Gilbert Islands which form part of modern Kiribati. The first Baháʼís pioneered to the island of Abaiang(aka Charlotte Island, of the Gilbert Islands), on 4 March 1954. They encountered serious opposition from some Catholics on the islands and were eventually deported and the first convert banished to his home island. However, in one year there was a community of more than 200 Baháʼís and a Baháʼí Local Spiritual Assembly. Three years later the island where the first convert was sent to was found to now have 10 Baháʼís. By 1963 there were 14 assemblies. As the Ellice Islands gained independence as Tuvalu and the Gilbert Islands and others formed Kiribati, the communities of Baháʼís also reformed into separate institutions of National Spiritual Assemblies in 1981. The Baháʼís had established a number of schools by 1963 and there are still such today – indeed the Ootan Marawa Baháʼí Vocational Institute being the only teacher training institution for pre-school teachers in Kiribati. The census figures are consistently between 2 and 3% for the Baháʼís while the Baháʼís claim numbers above 17%. All together the Baháʼís now claim more than 10,000 local people have joined the religion over the last 50 years and there are 38 local spiritual assemblies.

== Marshall Islands ==
The Baháʼí Faith in the Marshall Islands begins after 1916 with a mention by ʻAbdu'l-Bahá, then head of the religion, that Baháʼís should take the religion there. The first Baháʼí to pioneer there arrived in August 1954 however she could only stay until March 1955. Nevertheless, with successive pioneers and converts the first Baháʼí Local Spiritual Assembly in 1967 in Majuro. The community continued to grow and in 1977 elected its first National Spiritual Assembly. Before 1992 the Baháʼís began to operate state schools under contract with the government. Middle estimates of the Baháʼí population are just over 1,000, or 1.50% in 2000.

== New Caledonia ==
The Baháʼí Faith in New Caledonia was first mentioned by ʻAbdu'l-Bahá in 1916, though the first Baháʼí arrived in 1952 during a temporary visit because of restrictive policies on English-speaking visitors. In 1961 Jeannette Outhey was the first New Caledonian to join the religion and with other converts and pioneers elected the first Baháʼí Local Spiritual Assembly of Nouméa. The Baháʼí National Spiritual Assembly of New Caledonia was elected in 1977. Multiplying its involvements through to today, the 2001 population was reported at 1,070 and growing.

== New Zealand ==
While the first mention of events related to the history of the Baháʼí Faith in New Zealand was in 1846 continuous contact began around 1904 when one individual after another came in contact with Baháʼís and some of them published articles in print media in New Zealand as early as 1908. The first Baháʼí in the Antipodes was Dorothea Spinney who had just arrived from New York in Auckland in 1912. Shortly thereafter there were two converts about 1913 – Robert Felkin who had met ʻAbdu'l-Bahá in London in 1911 and moved to New Zealand in 1912 and is considered a Baháʼí by 1914 and Margaret Stevenson who first heard of the religion in 1911 and by her own testimony was a Baháʼí in 1913. After ʻAbdu'l-Bahá wrote the Tablets of the Divine Plan which mentions New Zealand the community grew quickly so that the first Baháʼí Local Spiritual Assembly of the country was attempted in 1923 or 1924 and then succeeded in 1926. The Baháʼís of New Zealand elected their first independent National Spiritual Assembly in 1957. By 1963 there were four Assemblies, and 18 localities with smaller groups of Baháʼís. The 2006 census reports about 2800 Baháʼís in some 45 local assemblies and about 20 smaller groups of Baháʼís though the Association of Religion Data Archives estimated there were some 7,000 Baháʼís in 2005.

== Papua New Guinea ==
The Baháʼí Faith in Papua New Guinea begins after 1916 with a mention by ʻAbdu'l-Bahá, then head of the religion, that Baháʼís should take the religion there. The first Baháʼís move there (what Baháʼís mean by "pioneering",) in Papua New Guinea arrived there in 1954. With local converts the first Baháʼí Local Spiritual Assembly was elected in 1958. The first National Spiritual Assembly was then elected in 1969. The Association of Religion Data Archives (relying onWorld Christian Encyclopedia) estimated some 60,000 or 0.9% of the nation were Baháʼís in 2005 though the 2012 CIA Factbook estimated 1/3rd of that citing national census figures from 2000. It is, in either case, the largest minority religion in Papua New Guinea, though a small one. A national Baháʼí House of Worship is under construction in Papua New Guinea as of 2019.

== Samoa ==
The Baháʼí Faith in Samoa and American Samoa begins with the then head of the religion, ʻAbdu'l-Bahá, mentioning the islands in 1916, inspiring Baháʼís on their way to Australia to stop in Samoa in 1920. Thirty four years later another Baháʼí from Australia pioneered to Samoa in 1954. With the first converts the first Baháʼí Local Spiritual Assembly was elected in 1961, and the Baháʼí National Spiritual Assembly was first elected in 1970. Following the conversion of the then Head of State of Samoa, King Malietoa Tanumafili II, the first Baháʼí House of Worship of the Pacific Islands was finished in 1984 and the Baháʼí community reached a population of over 3,000 in about the year 2000.

== Tonga ==
The Baháʼí Faith in Tonga started after being set as a goal to introduce the religion in 1953, and Baháʼís arrived in 1954. With conversions and pioneers the first Baháʼí Local Spiritual Assembly was elected in 1958. From 1959 the Baháʼís of Tonga and their local institutions were members of a Regional Spiritual Assembly of the South Pacific. By 1963 there were five local assemblies. Less than forty years later, in 1996, the Baháʼís of Tonga established their paramount Baháʼí school in the form of the Ocean of Light International School. Around 2004 there were 29 local spiritual assemblies and about 5% of the national population were members of the Baháʼí Faith though the Tonga Broadcasting Commission maintained a policy that does not allow discussions by members of the Baháʼí Faith of its founder, Baháʼu'lláh on its radio broadcasts.

== Tuvalu ==
Baháʼí Faith is practised by 3% of the population of Tuvalu. There are relatively large numbers of Baháʼís in the Nanumea Island of Tuvalu.

== Vanuatu ==
The Baháʼí Faith has been present in Vanuatu since 1953 and the national administration was established as the National Spiritual Assembly of the New Hebrides in 1977. The religion's community of Vanuatu currently holds communal worship and children's classes. A Baháʼí temple designed by Ashkan Mostaghim was announced for the island of Tanna, with a design revealed in 2017. On 13 November 2021, the temple was opened in the town of Lenakel.

== See also ==
- Bahá'í Faith by country
- Religion in Oceania
- Buddhism in Oceania
- Islam in Oceania
