= Religion in Oceania =

Christianity is the dominant religion in Oceania.

== History ==
Before contact with Europeans, the different groups of the Pacific lived in systems of theocracy which generally utilised the widespread concept of tabu. Various Christian missionary organisations arrived in Japan (1549), the Philippines (16th century) and the Aleutians (18th century), but European and American missions converted most of the islands of Oceania to Christianity in the course of the 19th century.

== Religious distribution ==
=== Australasia ===
Country	Population	Christian		Muslim		Irreligion		Hindu		Buddhist		Folk religion		Other religion		Jewish	
Country	Population	Pop.	%	Pop.	%	Pop.	%	Pop.	%	Pop.	%	Pop.	%	Pop.	%	Pop.	%
Australia	25,422,800	11,148,800	43.90	813,392	3.20	9,887,000	38.90	684,002	2.70	615,800	2.40	325,400	1.30	178,160	0.80	100,350	0.40
New Zealand	4,699,755	1,738,638	37.00	61,455	1.31	2,278,185	48.47	123,504	2.63	52,779	1.12	19,011	0.40	153,873	3.27	5,274	0.11
Total	30,122,555	12,887,438	42.78%	874,487	2.90%	12,165,185	40.39%	807,506	2.68%	668,579	2.22%	344,411	0.59%	479,273	1.59%	109,090	0.36%

=== Melanesia ===
Country	Population	Christian		Muslim		Irreligion		Hindu		Buddhist		Folk religion		Other religion		Jewish	
Country	Population	Pop.	%	Pop.	%	Pop.	%	Pop.	%	Pop.	%	Pop.	%	Pop.	%	Pop.	%
Fiji	860,820	553,840	64.40	58,400	6.40	6,880	0.80	239,941	27.90	0	0.00	0	0.00	4,300	0.50	0	0.00
New Caledonia	250,000	213,000	85.20	7,000	2.80	26,000	10.40	0	0.00	1,500	0.60	500	0.20	2,000	0.80	0	0.00
Papua New Guinea	6,860,000	6,805,120	99.20	2,020	0.003	0	0.00	0	0.00	0	0.00	27,440	0.40	13,720	0.20	0	0.00
Solomon Islands	540,000	525,960	97.40	200	0.10	1,080	0.20	0	0.00	1,620	0.30	7,020	1.30	3,780	0.70	0	0.00
Vanuatu	240,000	223,920	93.30	1,000	0.10	2,880	1.20	0	0.00	0	0.00	9,840	4.10	3,360	1.40	0	0.00
Total	8,750,000	8,321,840	95.11%	61,180	0.70%	36,840	0.42%	239,940	2.74%	3,120	0.04%	44,800	0.51%	27,160	0.31%	0	0.00%

=== Micronesia ===
Country	Population	Christian		Muslim		Irreligion		Hindu		Buddhist		Folk religion		Other religion		Jewish	
Country	Population	Pop.	%	Pop.	%	Pop.	%	Pop.	%	Pop.	%	Pop.	%	Pop.	%	Pop.	%
Guam	180,000	169,560	94.20	300	0.10	3,060	1.60	0	0.00	1,980	1.10	2,700	1.50	2,880	1.60	0	0.00
Kiribati	101,120	97,000	97.00	500	0.20	800	0.80	0	0.00	0	0.00	0	0.00	2,200	2.00	0	0.00
Marshall Islands	50,000	48,750	97.50	180	0.20	750	1.50	0	0.00	0	0.00	100	0.10	400	0.80	0	0.00
(Federated States of Micronesia) Micronesia	110,000	104,830	95.20	208	0.10	990	1.00	0	0.00	440	0.40	2,975	2.60	770	0.70	0	0.00
Nauru	10,000	7,900	79.00	20	0.01	450	4.50	0	0.00	110	1.10	810	8.10	740	7.40	0	0.00
Northern Mariana Islands	60,000	48,780	81.30	420	0.70	600	1.00	0	0.00	6,360	10.60	3,180	5.30	660	1.10	0	0.00
Palau	20,000	17,340	86.80	240	0.10	240	1.20	0	0.00	160	0.80	160	0.80	2,080	10.20	0	0.00
Total	530,000	494,160	93.24%	1808	0.08%	6,890	1.30%	0	0.00%	9,050	1.71%	9,970	1.88%	9,730	1.84%	0	0.00%

=== Polynesia ===
Country	Population	Christian		Muslim		Irreligion		Hindu		Buddhist		Folk religion		Other religion		Jewish	
Country	Population	Pop.	%	Pop.	%	Pop.	%	Pop.	%	Pop.	%	Pop.	%	Pop.	%	Pop.	%
American Samoa	70,920	68,860	98.30	50	0.10	490	0.70	0	0.00	210	0.30	280	0.40	210	0.30	0	0.00
Cook Islands	20,000	19,200	96.00	0	0.00	640	3.20	0	0.00	0	0.00	0	0.00	160	0.80	0	0.00
French Polynesia	270,000	253,800	94.00	688	0.10	13,230	4.80	0	0.00	0	0.00	1,350	0.50	1,080	0.40	0	0.00
Niue	2,000	1,928	96.40	50	0.10	66	3.20	0	0.00	0	0.00	0	0.00	4	0.20	0	0.00
Samoa	180,000	174,240	96.80	300	0.10	4,500	2.50	0	0.00	0	0.00	0	0.00	720	0.30	0	0.00
Tokelau	1,414	1,397	99.80	0	0.00	0	0.00	0	0.00	0	0.00	0	0.00	3	0.20	0	0.00
Tonga	100,000	99,000	99.00	120	0.10	0	0.00	100	0.10	0	0.00	0	0.00	900	0.80	0	0.00
Tuvalu	11,000	10,800	99.80	200	0.20	0	0.00	0	0.00	0	0.00	0	0.00	0	0.00	0	0.00
Wallis and Futuna	13,000	12,662	97.40	0	0.00	78	0.60	0	0.00	0	0.00	156	1.20	104	0.80	0	0.00
Total	667,400	641,574	96.13%	1400	0.20%	19,147	2.87%	100	0.01%	210	0.03%	1,786	0.27%	3,390	0.51%	0	0.00%

== Hyponyms ==
- Religion in Australia
- Religion in New Zealand
- Religion in Hawaii
- Religion in Fiji
- Religion in Papua New Guinea
- Religion in Samoa
- Religion in Tonga
- Religion in the Marshall Islands
- Religion in Palau
- Religion in Kiribati
- Religion in Vanuatu

== See also ==
- Culture of Oceania
- Major religious groups
- Bahá'í Faith in Oceania
- Islam in Oceania
- Buddhism in Oceania
- Freedom of religion in Oceania by country
- Hinduism in Oceania Countries
- Religion in Africa
- Religion in Asia
- Religion in Europe
- Religion in North America
- Religion in South America
