= Ingleside, New South Wales =

Ingleside
- Suburb
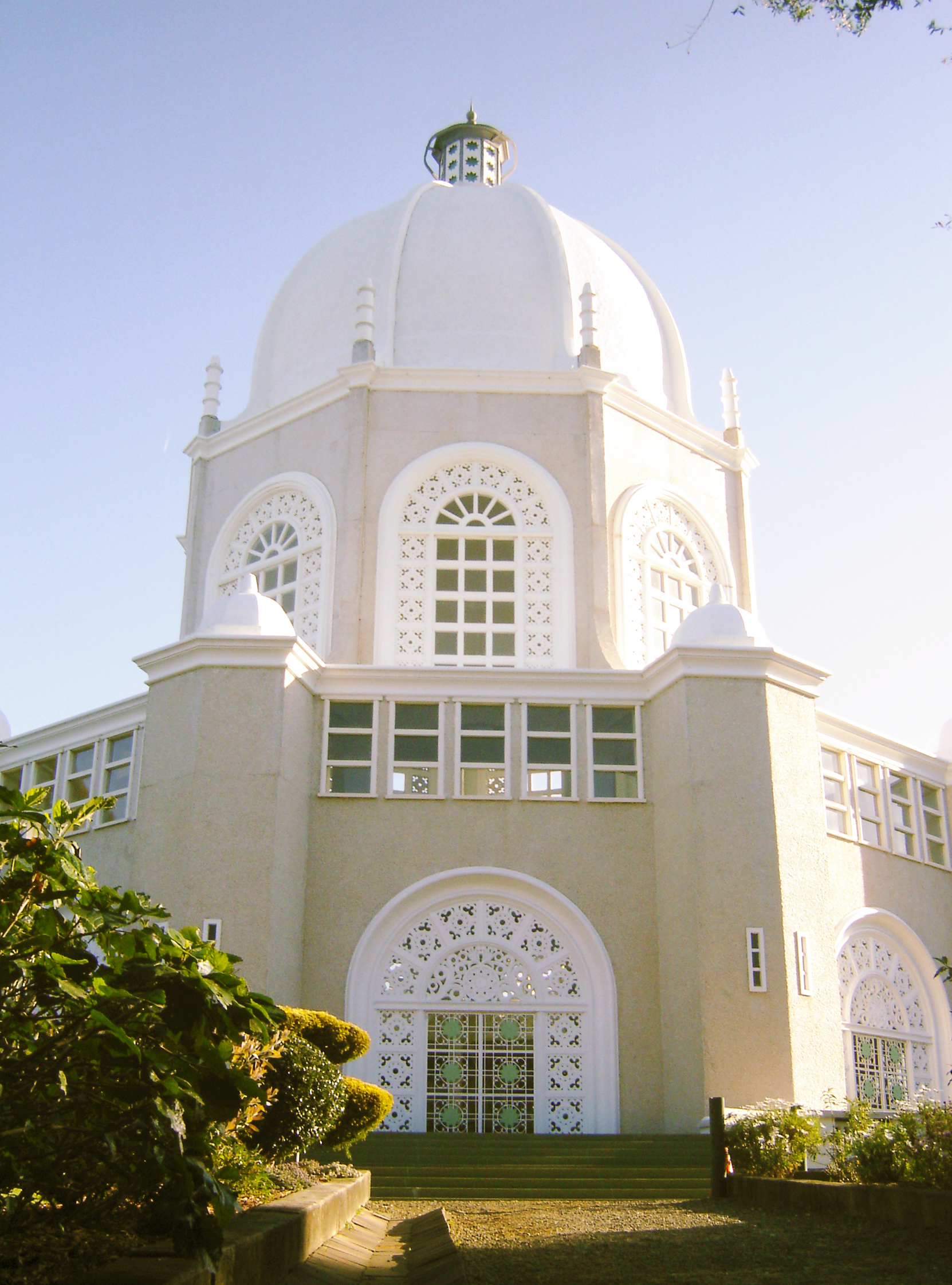
- Sydney Baháʼí Temple

- Interactive map of Ingleside
- Country: Australia
- State: New South Wales
- City: Sydney
- LGA: Northern Beaches Council
- Location: 28 km (17 mi) north of Sydney CBD

Government
  - State electorate: Pittwater
  - Federal division: Mackellar
- Elevation: 198 m (650 ft)

Population
  - Total: 1,030 (SAL 2021)
- Postcode: 2101
Suburbs around Ingleside
Ku-ring-gai Chase NP	Bayview	Mona Vale
Terrey Hills	Ingleside	Elanora Heights
Belrose	Oxford Falls	Cromer

Ingleside is a suburb in Northern Sydney, in the state of New South Wales, Australia. Ingleside is located 28 kilometres north of the Sydney central business district, in the local government area of Northern Beaches Council. Ingleside Heights and Tumbledown Dick are localities in the west of the suburb.

The area is mostly semi-rural properties and bushland with increasing housing developments.

== History ==
The suburb takes its name from a mansion in the area called Ingleside House, built in the 1880s by Baron von Bieren, an industrial chemist of Dutch and American background. He specialised in gunpowder and explosives, founding a factory called the Australian Gunpowder and Explosives Manufacturing Company. Powder Works Road takes its name from this factory.

== Population ==
In the 2021 Census, there were 1,030 people in Ingleside. 72.1% of people were born in Australia. The next most common countries of birth were England 4.6%, Italy 2.5%, and New Zealand 2.2%. 77.1% of people spoke only English at home. Other languages spoken at home included Italian 3.0% and Serbian 2.2%. The most common responses for religion were No Religion 34.8%, Catholic 25.8%, and Anglican 11.7%.

== Landmarks ==
- The Sydney Baháʼí Temple, the world's fourth Baháʼí House of Worship, was completed in 1961.
- The Smoky Dawson Ranch was the home of one of Australia's most popular country music singers. The former ranch was sold to the HASG Armenian School. In 2002 the school opened a commemorative Smoky Dawson ranch-style gate, which has become a tourist attraction.
- DoggieRescue.com, an animal rescue and re-homing shelter started by Monika Biernacki.

== Schools ==
- Hamazkaine A&S Galstaun College (Armenian Private College)
