= Tocal Homestead =

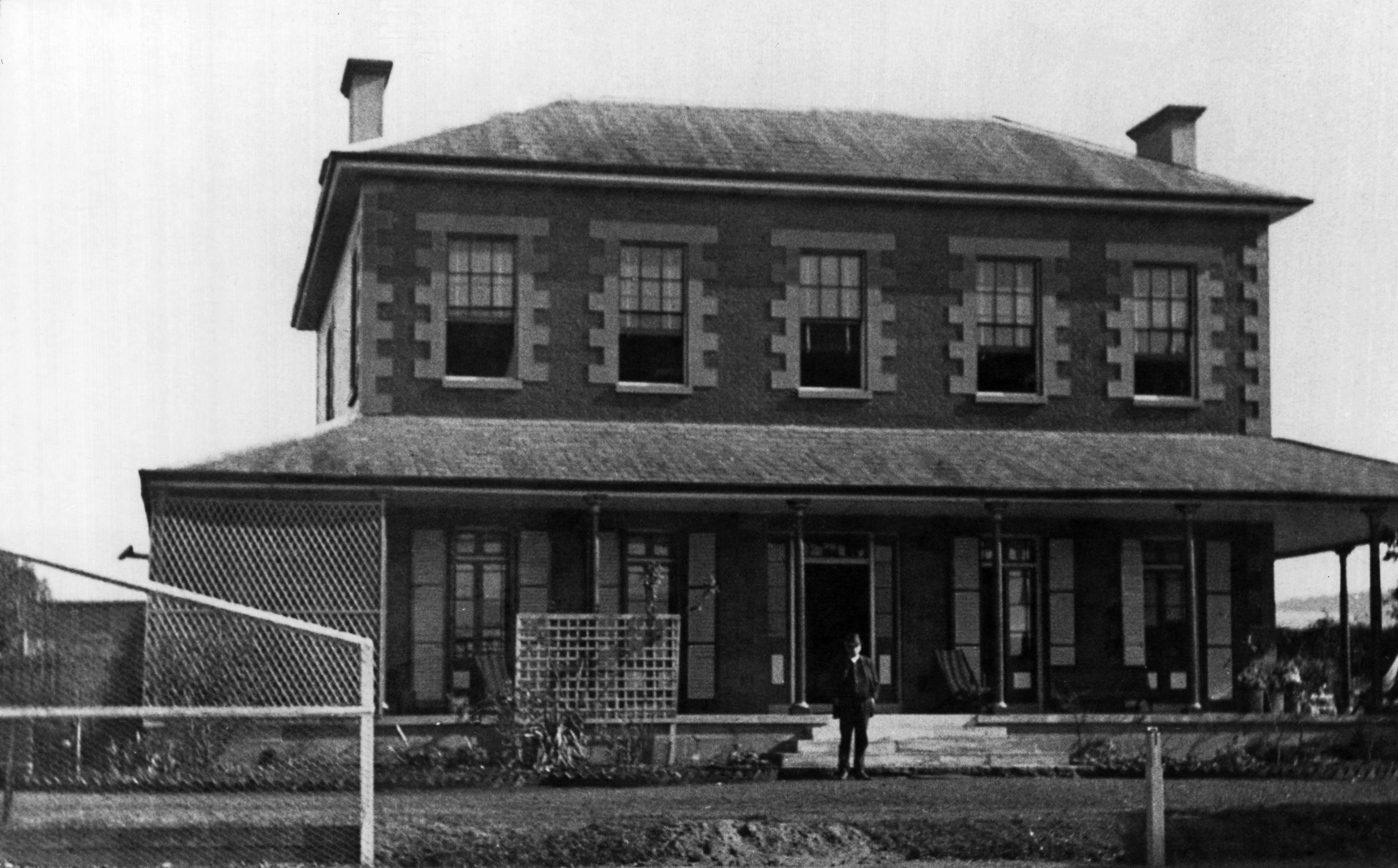

- Location within New South Wales Location within Australia
- 32.6236°S 151.5903°E
- Location: Tocal Road, Paterson, Dungog Shire, New South Wales, Australia

History
- Built: 1822–1922

Site notes
- Architects: William Moir (1845 homestead); Edmund Blacket (1867 barn)
- Owner: C.B. Alexander Foundation

New South Wales Heritage Register
- Official name: Tocal Homestead
- Type: State heritage (complex / group)
- Designated: 2 April 1999
- Reference no.: 147
- Type: Homestead Complex
- Category: Farming and Grazing
- Builders: Various

Tocal Homestead is a heritage-listed homestead at Tocal Road, Paterson, Dungog Shire, New South Wales, Australia. The original 1845 homestead was designed by William Moir, while an 1867 barn was designed by Edmund Blacket. The property is owned by the C. B. Alexander Foundation. It was added to the New South Wales State Heritage Register on 2 April 1999. The Tocal College complex, built on the former homestead grounds from the 1960s, is separately heritage-listed.

== History ==
=== Aboriginal people ===
Prior to 1822 the area was part of the lands of the Gringai Clan of the Wonnerau people and used as a camp site. Tocal is derived from Koori language meaning "Ducks Aplenty".

The presence of the large lagoon was one of the deciding factors in the use of this area by both Aboriginal people (who harvested plants and animals for use in daily life – from the rainforest along the river and surrounding paperbark (Melaleuca sp.) forest, which provided a great variety of food and materials) and European settlers, as it provides a permanent source of fresh water for humans and animals. The proximity of the site to the river was also a factor in settlement by Europeans as the river remained a major transport route for 100 years.

=== Webber ownership ===
The site was a 1,600-hectare (4,000-acre) land grant to J. P. Webber in 1822, who established it as a productive farm.

The fertile flats on the banks of Webber's Creek were cleared with convict labour in the 1820s and it is from this land that much of the wealth of Tocal was created. The low-lying area and wetlands at the back of the homestead was one of the first areas to be cleared by Europeans for building materials, grazing stock and to establish food crops.

The planting of vineyards and the making of wine were given every encouragement by the early governors of New South Wales, as well as by urban and rural authorities, for their economic value and also partly, if not chiefly, for their "sobering" appeal.

There is no indication of who actually planted the first vines in the Hunter Valley. The first official returns did not appear until 1843 and listed only acreages and production figures by counties. However, a list of vines planted in the colony by 1832 appears in manuscript notes on the flyleaves of a copy of James Busby's 1830 publication, A Manual of plain directions for planting and cultivating vineyards and for making wine in NSW. At this stage there were 10 settlers on the Hunter River growing vines. These included James P. Webber at Tocal who had one hectare (three acres) of a Hunter Valley total of 6 hectares (15.5 acres). In 1834 Webber supplied George Wyndham of Dalwood estate Oporto and Gouais grape cuttings.

So great was the interest to be in wine making that when the first returns for vineyards were made in 1844 for the year 1843, the Hunter had 106 hectares (262.5 acres) of a NSW total of 206 hectares (508 acres). By 1850 this had grown to over 202 hectares (500 acres). The Maitland Mercury estimated that in 1850 there were 32 vine growers in the Maitland Police district alone. The Hunter pattern was for large farming and grazing properties. J. D. Lang noted that in 1836 the farms varied from 202–809 hectares (500–2,000 acres), and were held by free immigrants employing convict labour. The areas devoted to vines were necessarily small though Lang does say that the wealthy proprietors had their vineyards managed by scientific and practical vine dressers from southern Europe and that landholders were already talking of exporting wine to India and England.

=== Wilson ownership and Reynolds' occupation ===
In 1834 Webber sold Tocal to Caleb and Felix Wilson (father and son), who had a large business in Sydney. Caleb died in 1838. The Wilson family built the homestead in 1840 (Hathway, 2003, 4 says it was 1841). Felix commissioned Scottish architect, William Moir to design it for use as a country residence, and the Wilson family held the property till 1907. Respected 20th century architect William Hardy Wilson was descended from this family.

In 1844 Charles Reynolds leased Tocal until 1871 and the following two generations of that family made it one of the most famous stud farms in the country. "The Barb", winner of the 1886 Melbourne Cup, stood at Tocal. "Free Trader" winner of the 1856 Grand National was imported by the Reynolds to Tocal but before he could be extensively used was stolen by bushranger Captain Thunderbolt. Thunderbolt had previously worked on Tocal as a horsebreaker.

During the period of Frank Reynolds' leasehold and subsequent purchase prior to Reynolds family, extensive timber buildings were added to the site including the Blacket Barn, designed by Edmund Blacket and built in the late 1860s.

Also during the Reynolds family occupation (1844–1926) the homestead was a social hub of the district. A tennis court was located between the (now huge) fig trees, which were then considerably smaller. The family entertained regularly in the homestead and held tennis parties on the front lawn.

In 1865 Felix Wilson died and Tocal was willed by entail to (unborn grandson) David Wilson. In 1871 Charles Reynolds died and management and stud stock were transferred to his widow Frances and their sons.

In 1907 Tocal was sold to Charles Reynolds' son, Frank Reynolds. Frank died in 1920.

Sons, Darcie and Arthur Reynolds ran the Tocal property as the estate of Frank Reynolds from 1920 to 1926.

=== Alexander family ===
In 1926 the property was sold to the Alexander siblings (Jean, Isabella, Robert and Charles Boyd (C.B.)), who ran it as a breeding and dealing property.

In 1938 Jean Alexander died leaving Charles (C.B.) on his own at Tocal. The following year Myrtle and Marguerita Curtis came to Tocal to live with their uncle Charles. The Alexanders were a much more private family than the Reynolds. The departure of the Reynolds left a void in the social life of the district and led to a misconception that the Alexanders were snobbish. The Valley garden was a favourite spot of Myrtle and Marguerita Curtis. It most likely dates from the Alexanders' time, and displays the style of garden favoured by early settlers, based on familiar English plants.

The last of the family, C. B. Alexander, died in 1947 leaving a complex will for the estate which among other things, left his properties (this one included) to establish homes for "destitute, homeless and orphan children" - in time this would provide for the establishment of an agricultural institution at Tocal. He gave his nieces, Misses Myrtle and Marguerita Curtis life tenancy and they lived at Tocal Homestead until 1985, dying just five days apart.

=== C. B. Alexander College ===
In 1963 a solution to Charles Alexander's will was found by Edward A. Hunt, and work began on the construction of an agricultural college. The C. B. Alexander Presbyterian Agricultural College was opened by the Presbyterian Church on Tocal Homestead land in 1965.

In 1970, management of the college was handed to the New South Wales Department of Agriculture, and the college was renamed the C. B. Alexander Agricultural College. In 1981, the Department of Agriculture's external study program moved to Tocal. The Tocal Field Days began in 1984.

Upon the death of Myrtle and Marguerita Curtis in 1985, the contents of the homestead were bequeathed to the college. Since then the homestead has been run and operated by the C. B. Alexander Foundation.

In 1987, Tocal Homestead was opened to public visitors for the first time. A visitor centre opened in two stages in a former hayshed east of the house in 2001 and 2002, and the homestead commenced. It has continued being used for agricultural purposes as well, with the Maitland district office of the Department of Agriculture moving to Tocal in 2000 and a multi-purpose skill shed opening in 2001.

== Description ==
=== Garden & Setting ===
The landscape includes wetlands, riverine rainforest and formally dry sclerophyll forest land which has been cleared to become pasture land. The Tocal Agricultural Centre property is 2,500 hectares (6,200 acres) comprising 5 farming enterprises, a heritage precinct and one of Australia's top agricultural colleges.

Tocal Homestead is carefully located on the top of a small rise overlooking the lagoon to its east and Paterson Road beyond that. The house is framed by a number of magnificent (again, carefully placed) mature Moreton Bay fig trees (Ficus macrophylla) which are visible from quite some distance away and the homestead garden is enclosed, by a white painted picket fence.

Other trees near the house include some local rainforest species, such as red kamala (Mallotus philippensis) south-west of the homestead facing its rear yard. This may represent bird-dropped seed but is an unusual find in any garden.

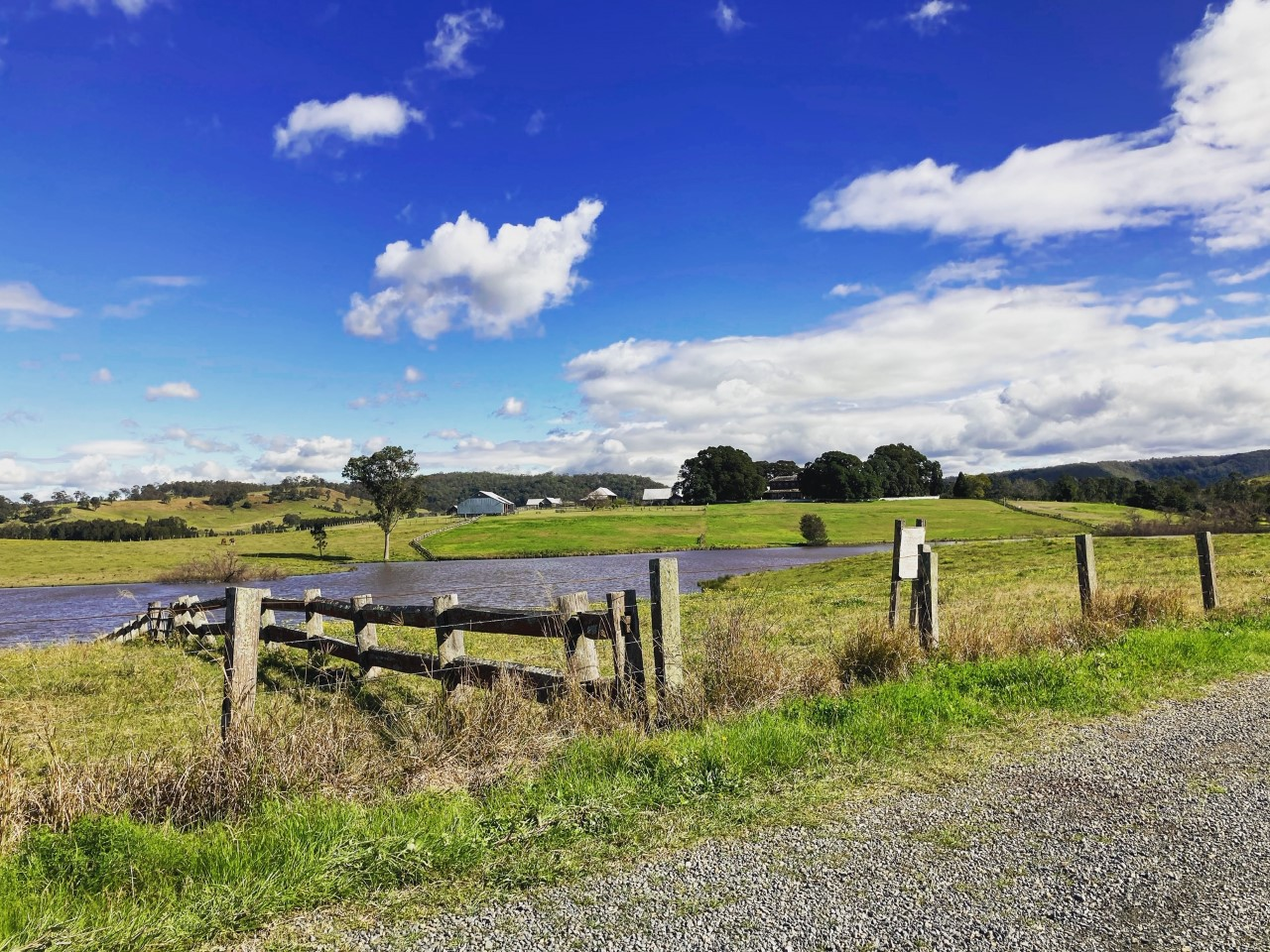
looking towards Tocal homestead, Tocal, New South Wales

A hedge of Cape honeysuckle (Tecomaria capensis) runs from the house's rear to the north, demarcating the garden "front" and the service yards and outbuildings to the rear. Another rare plant in the garden is the Solomon Islands leafless shrub, ribbon bush (Homocladium platycladum), otherwise only seen in Botanic Gardens).

=== Homestead ===
The Homestead consists of a late Georgian/Regency Revival rendered sandstock brick two storey homestead, with verandahs (flagged sandstone) on three sides, set on a knoll overlooking the Paterson River and surrounding areas.

=== Outbuildings ===
The site also consists of a wide range of vernacular timber buildings, stockyards, post and rail fences, underground silos and other elements representing technology of a 19th-century farm. These consist of convict-built sandstock brick residential buildings, as well as a large stone barn built in 1830 by convicts, an 1860s timber barn designed by architect Edmund Blacket and yards, fences etc.

=== Condition ===
The physical condition of the site was reported as being good to fair as at 7 May 1998. Archaeological potential is high given the undisturbed nature of the site.

The collection maintains a very high degree of integrity with most original material remaining.

Homestead – The Homestead remains in quite intact condition with modern facilities and some equipment. The exterior bricks have been painted, however the rest of the exterior is in original state.

Stone Barn – This 1830 building is in original condition but with a 1920s attachment used by the previous owner as a carport.

Sandstock Brick Buildings, Barracks & Thunderbolt's Cottage – These are in reasonably stable condition, they require extensive repairs but retain much of their original qualities.

Timber Outbuildings – These are in quite good condition. A garage has been converted to public toilets (1990) and the staff quarters modified to incorporate Tea Rooms (1990, 1996)

== Heritage listing ==
The place is significant because it represents the complete range of human habitation in the Paterson Valley. There is evidence of its use by the Gringai Clan of the Wonnerau people through the name "Tocal" and the presence of axe grinding grooves on site. The main significance of Tocal as a European site is the entire precinct which is a stud horse and cattle agricultural property from the 19th century. It is extremely rare to find such a complete complex of largely unaltered buildings. The fact that many are typical timber structures also demonstrates various construction technologies.

Tocal under James P. Webber is also significant for its association with the development of viticulture and the development of the Hunter Valley wine industry.

within this important precinct is the Homestead representing a residence of which few of equal age and quality remain today.

Also of exceptional significance is the original Webber's homestead and stables plus the barracks. The design of the homestead with the house, staff quarters and stables all part of one building but separately accessed plus the two storey town house type of accommodation (barracks) for farm workers are very rare, if not unique.

The Blacket-designed barn is a finely detailed building by one of Australia's prominent architects of the 19th century.

There are many more elements of considerable significance including the cattle shed which represents a rare and special building to accommodate cattle.

The other significant element is the generator and associated farm equipment. Although not old compared with Tocal, its completeness is an extremely valuable heritage asset.

Most of the remaining elements have some significance in their own right.

The association of the Reynolds is also a very important one. They were pioneers in stud cattle and horses, who contributed greatly to stud breeding and recognition. Reynolds was a name synonymous with Hereford cattle in NSW for a nearly a century that remains largely as it was when they operated it.

Tocal Homestead was listed on the New South Wales State Heritage Register on 2 April 1999 having satisfied the following criteria.

The place is important in demonstrating the course, or pattern, of cultural or natural history in New South Wales.

The entire precinct represents a solo horse and cattle agricultural property from the 19th century. The early structures are among the finest in the area and include the convict built Webbers cottage, Barracks and Barn.

The place is important in demonstrating aesthetic characteristics and/or a high degree of creative or technical achievement in New South Wales.

Few residences of equal age or quality remain as the Tocal Homestead. The Barn is a finely detailed building by one of Australia's prominent 19th century architects, Edmund Blacket.

The place has strong or special association with a particular community or cultural group in New South Wales for social, cultural or spiritual reasons.

The association with the Gringai Clan of the Wonnerau people, with Reynolds who were pioneers in stud cattle and horses and the Alexander family are all important social aspects of the property.

The place has potential to yield information that will contribute to an understanding of the cultural or natural history of New South Wales.

The various timber structures demonstrate 19th century construction technologies. The generator and associated equipment are old and rare examples of electrical equipment. The archaeological potential is high as some structures have been removed and areas are largely undisturbed.

The place possesses uncommon, rare or endangered aspects of the cultural or natural history of New South Wales.

The collection as a whole is rare, the Blacket Barn is one of his few remaining rural structures. The silos are also rare examples.

The place is important in demonstrating the principal characteristics of a class of cultural or natural places/environments in New South Wales.

The timber structures are representative of 19th century technology and the farm is a collection representative of a 19th-century farm.

== See also ==
- Tocal College
