= Freedom of religion in Oceania by country =

The status of religious freedom in Oceania varies from country to country. States can differ based on whether or not they guarantee equal treatment under law for followers of different religions, whether they establish a state religion (and the legal implications that this has for both practitioners and non-practitioners), the extent to which religious organizations operating within the country are policed, and the extent to which religious law is used as a basis for the country's legal code.

There are further discrepancies between some countries' self-proclaimed stances of religious freedom in law and the actual practice of authority bodies within those countries: a country's establishment of religious equality in their constitution or laws does not necessarily translate into freedom of practice for residents of the country. Additionally, similar practices (such as having religious organizations register with the government) can have different consequences depending on other sociopolitical circumstances specific to the countries in question.

All of the countries in Oceania officially guarantee the right to freedom of religion in a constitution or bill of rights, although over half qualify this freedom as being subordinate to other concerns such as public safety or "morality". Additionally, a few countries have communal local leadership structures which are sometimes hostile to foreign religions, despite official legal requirements for tolerance. Only two countries in Oceania, Samoa and Tuvalu, have state religions (Christianity for Samoa and a specific Christian church for Tuvalu), and a few additional countries specifically reference Christianity as a core or founding principle in their constitutions. According to US government reports, about one quarter of the countries in Oceania have had no significant breaches of the freedom of religion; a similar proportion have recorded incidents of violence against religious minorities in the 21st century, against Hindus (Fiji), Jews (Australia) and Muslims (New Zealand and Papua New Guinea, with other countries having significant quantities of anti-Muslim political discourse).

== Australia ==
Chapter V. The States; Section 116 of the Australian Constitution reads: "The Commonwealth shall not make any law for establishing any religion, or for imposing any religious observance, or for prohibiting the free exercise of any religion, and no religious test shall be required as a qualification for any office or public trust under the Commonwealth." Some states and territories, such as Victoria and the Australian Capital Territory have implemented additional charters which further protect the right to freedom of religion.

=== Societal discrimination of religious minorities ===
Antisemitism is present in Australian society, manifesting primarily in the form of attacks on synagogues, ranging in severity from vandalism to arson and bombings. Anti-semitic material has been found distributed on Australian college campuses.

According to some scholars, a particular trend of anti-Muslim prejudice has developed in Australia since the late 1980s. Various far-right groups have held anti-Muslim rallies and have otherwise espoused anti-Muslim political campaigns. A 2014 report from the Islamic Sciences and Research Academy, University of Western Sydney, on mosques in New South Wales found that 44 percent of mosques in the state had "experienced resistance from the local community when the mosque was initially proposed". In around 20 percent of these cases opposition was from a small number of people.

== Federated States of Micronesia ==
The constitution of Micronesia states that laws establishing a state religion or impeding the freedom of religion may not be passed.

There are no registration requirements for religious groups. There is no religious education in public schools, but private religious schools are allowed so long as they also teach the curriculum established by the Department of Education.

A small community of Ahmadiyya Muslims (~20 people as of 2017) have reported discrimination, including both the denial of government services and vandalism against their property.

== Fiji ==
The constitution of Fiji establishes the freedom of religion and defines the country as a secular state, but also provides that the government may override these laws for reasons of public safety, order, morality, health, or nuisance, as well as to protect the freedom of others. Discrimination on religious grounds is outlawed, and incitement of hatred against religious groups is a criminal offense. The constitution further states that religious belief may not be used as an excuse for disobeying the law, and formally limits proselytization on government property and at official events.

Religious organizations must register with the government through a trustee in order to be able to hold property and to be granted tax-exempt status.

Religious groups may run schools, but all religious courses or prayer sessions must be optional for students and teachers. Schools may profess a religious or ethnic character, but must remain open to all students.

Religion, ethnicity, and politics are closely linked in Fiji; government officials have criticized religious groups for their support of opposition parties. In 2017, the Republic of Fiji Military Forces issued a press release stating that Methodist leaders were advocating for the country to become "a Christian nation" and that this could cause societal unrest. Following the press release, Methodist leaders distanced themselves from their previous statements, and other religious leaders also affirmed the nonpolitical nature of their religious movements.

Many Hindus of Fiji emigrated to other countries. Several Hindu temples were burned, believed to be arson attacks, for example, the Kendrit Shiri Sanatan Dharam Shiv Temple. While Hindus face less persecution than before, a Hindu temple was vandalized in 2017. Later that year, following an online post by an Indian Muslim cleric visiting the country, a significant amount of anti-Muslim discourse was recorded on Fijian Facebook pages, causing controversy.

== Kiribati ==
The constitution of Kiribati provides for the freedom of religion, although it also states that this freedom may be overruled in the interests of public defense, safety, order, morality, or health, or to protect the rights of others. Most government ceremonies open and close with Christian prayer. The government also provides small development grants to religious organizations among other NGOs.

Any religious group representing more than 2 percent of the population (about 2160 people as of the 2015 census) must register with the government, although there are no penalties for failure to register.

There is no standardized religious education program in public schools, but schools generally allow representatives of various faiths to provide religious education courses.

Two islands in Kiribati, Arorae and Tamana, maintain a "one-church-only" tradition, refusing to build any religious structures other than a single church. According to officials, this custom is in deference to the Protestant missionaries that arrived on those islands in the 19th century. Residents of other religions on those islands are able to worship freely in their homes, and the government has received no reports of complaints about this policy.

== Marshall Islands ==
The constitution of the Marshall Islands establishes the freedom of religion, although it provides that this freedom may be limited by "reasonable restrictions". The constitution further states that no law may discriminate against any person on the basis of religion.

There are no requirements for religious groups to register with the government, but they may receive tax benefits if they register as non-profits.

There is no religious education in public schools, but school events and government functions typically begin and end with a Christian prayer. According to the government, this is a longstanding practice that is widely accepted in the country. The government provides funding to private religious schools.

The Ahmadiyya Muslim community in the Marshall Islands has reported that it faces difficulties interacting with the government, as well as harassment in general society. Representatives attributed these attitudes to prejudice against Muslims due to perceptions that Islam is linked to terrorism.

== Nauru ==
The constitution of Nauru establishes the freedom of conscience and expression, although it provides that these rights may be limited by any law which is "reasonably required".

Religious groups are required to register with the government in order to proselytize, build houses of worship, hold religious services, or officiate marriages. As of 2014, religious groups are required to have 750 members to register. According to local religious leaders, in practice the only activity which is restricted for unregistered groups is marriage officiation.

Religious groups are allowed to operate private schools. In public schools, religious groups are allowed to provide religious studies courses once a week during school hours. Students are expected to attend courses pertaining to their chosen religious denomination; other students are expected to use the time as an independent study period.

According to a 2017 US government report, there are no significant societal limits on religious freedom in Nauru.

== New Zealand ==
There has never been a state church in New Zealand, although prayers are said in Parliament. The New Zealand Bill of Rights Act 1990 codified freedom of religion and belief in Section 15. Blasphemous libel is a crime in New Zealand, but cases can only be prosecuted with the approval of the Attorney-General and the defence of opinion is allowed: "It is not an offence against this section to express in good faith and in decent language, or to attempt to establish by arguments used in good faith and conveyed in decent language, any opinion whatever on any religious subject." The only prosecution, in 1922, was unsuccessful.

In March 2019, two mosques were attacked by a white supremacist, killing 49 and injuring an additional 51. The attacks were condemned by general society and the government, which announced that it would be undertaking a royal commission of inquiry into the attacks.

== Palau ==
The constitution of Palau establishes the freedom of religion and prohibits the government from taking any action to infringe upon it. It also states that the country has no state religion.

Religious groups are required to register with the government as nonprofit organizations. Foreign missionaries are also required to apply for missionary permits from the Bureau of Immigration and Labor.

Religious instruction is prohibited in public schools, but religious groups are allowed to request government funds to run private schools.

According to US State Department reports, there have been no significant societal breaches of religious freedom in Palau.

== Papua New Guinea ==
The constitution of Papua New Guinea establishes the freedom of religion and religious practice, provided that it does not infringe on the rights of others or public interest. There is no state religion, although the preamble to the constitution mentions "the Christian principles" the country is founded upon. Parliament sessions and most official government functions open and close with Christian prayer. Since 2016, the government has pursued programs to increase partnership between churches and the state, including subsidies to churches and the establishment of church councils to assist in local governance.

Religious groups are required to register the government in order to hold property and obtain tax-exempt status. Foreign missionaries are allowed into the country on special work visas with lower fees than other visa categories.

Churches operate roughly half of the educational and medical institutions in the country, and receive government subsidies to provide these services. Public schools provide one hour of non-compulsory religious education per week; in practice, few students opt out of these lessons. Government officials have discussed plans to make religious education compulsory, but as of the end of 2017 these were not implemented.

Religious leaders have stated that religious groups are generally able to practice their religion without interference. However, there have been multiple incidences of Muslim refugees and asylum seekers being the targets of stabbings. Other Muslim residents of Papua New Guinea have not faced such attacks.

== Samoa ==
The constitution of Samoa guarantees the protection of freedom of religion. However, these laws are generally not enforced at the local level, as many villages have an official religion and do not allow residents to practice other religions. While the courts generally rule in favour of those alleging that their religious freedom has been violated, few cases make it to court. In June 2017, a clause was added to the constitution making Christianity the state religion.

Religious groups are not required to register with the government, but may do so in order to receive tax exemptions.

Christian religious instruction is compulsory in schools.

== Solomon Islands ==
The constitution of the Solomon Islands establishes the freedom of religion, although it also allows for this freedom to be curtailed when "reasonably required" by other laws.

All religious organizations are required to register with the government.

The public school curriculum includes an hour of optional weekly religious education, with the content determined by the Solomon Islands Christian Association. Non-christian religious instruction is available by request. The government subsidizes schools and health centers operated by religious organizations, in addition to providing small grants to religious organizations.

Leaders of minority groups in the Solomon Islands have reported no incidents of religious discrimination as of 2017.

== Tonga ==
The constitution of Tonga establishes the freedom of religion, with the qualification that this freedom is not used to "commit evil" or to otherwise violate the law. The constitution forbids commercial transactions on Sundays in accordance with the Christian Sabbath, although the tourism industry is granted some exceptions from this rule.

Religious organizations are not required to register with the government, but may do so in order to receive tax exemptions, the right to issue legally recognized marriage certificates, and other privileges. Foreign missionaries may operate in the country without special restrictions.

Public schools may choose to include up to an hour of religious education per week; students are required to attend religious education courses pertaining to the religion that they profess. Many religious organizations operate private schools.

The government allows religious organizations to broadcast programming on TV Tonga and Radio Tonga, officially with the restriction that they must limit their messaging to be "within the limits of the mainstream Christian tradition". Despite this restriction, in the past the Baháʼí Faith community has televised programming, although the community has since discontinued this program. As of 2017, there have been no reports of the government denying requests for air time from any religious organization.

== Tuvalu ==
The constitution of Tuvalu establishes the freedom of religion, although it allows this freedom to be limited by other laws. It establishes Tuvalu as an "independent state based on Christian principles, the Rule of Law, and Tuvaluan custom and tradition". The Ekalesia A Kelisiano Tuvalu, a congregational church, is officially the state church of Tuvalu, although in practice this just accords the church and its followers "the privilege of performing special services on major national events.

Religious organizations whose adult membership comprises at least 2% of the population of Tuvalu are required to register with the government or face prosecution. Additionally, all religious groups, regardless of size, must register with and gain approval from the traditional elder councils (falekaupule) of any island on which they wish to publicly practice their religion. Groups not approved by the councils may face fines if they contain to host meetings. On some islands, the elder councils have issued proselytization bans.

Representatives of religious minorities on the main island of Funafuti report that they are able to practice their faiths freely. On other islands they face greater obstacles, although most are still able to practice privately without disruption. The government has engaged in programs to foster tolerance of religious diversity, but minority groups assert that these programs have been insufficient in attaining their goals on the country's outer islands.

== Vanuatu ==
The constitution of Vanuatu establishes the freedom of religion, and also states that the state is founded on a commitment to "traditional Melanesian values, faith in God, and Christian principles."

Religious groups are required to register with the government or face fines, but this law is not enforced in practice. Religious groups are allowed to establish private schools, and both private and public schools include optional religious education courses.

Since 2016, high ranking members of the government have expressed the intent to define Vanuatu as a Christian country and to prohibit other religions from entering the country. As of the end of 2017, no actual legislation has been passed to this effect.
