= DoggieRescue.com =

- Formation: 2001
- Founder: Monika Biernacki
- Type: Registered charity
- VAT ID no.: ABN 49098918471
- Location: 2 McCowan Road, Ingleside NSW
- Region served: Australia
- Services: Dog rescue and re-homing
- Leader: Monika Biernacki
- Main organ: DoggieRescue magazine
- Website: www.doggierescue.com

DoggieRescue.com, also known as Monika's Rescues, is a charitable organisation founded by Monika Biernacki in Sydney, Australia that saves abandoned dogs about to be euthanized in animal shelters, provides medical attention and seeks to re-home them with new families. The organisation has a "no kill" policy, which means that rescued dogs spend the rest of their life with an adoptive family or in the shelter.

By August 2014, DoggieRescue.com had arranged the adoption of 11,000 otherwise unwanted dogs.

== History ==
Monika Biernacki (born 2 January 1956) was interested in helping sick and homeless dogs from an early age. She had considered training as a veterinarian but she "couldn't handle putting animals down, or vivisection". She instead qualified and practiced as a geologist. After a local vet said he had to euthanize two healthy but unwanted dogs, she agreed to take the dogs and find them new homes. As her re-homing operation grew, Biernacki enlisted the support of volunteers and moved to larger premises, previously at Duffys Forest and Homebush, before settling at Ingleside. The organisation was registered as a charity in 1991.

Biernacki was awarded the Medal of the Order of Australia (OAM) for "service to animal welfare" in the 2021 Queen's Birthday Honours.

== See also ==
- Animal welfare and rights in Australia
