= Kendrit Shiri Sanatan Dharam Shiv Temple =

Hindu temple in Fiji, destroyed by fire on 16 October 2008

The Kendrit Shiri Sanatan Dharam Shiv Temple was a Hindu temple in Nadi, Fiji. Built by indentured Indian labourers in 1905, it was one of the oldest Hindu temples in Fiji, until it was destroyed by fire on 16 October 2008. Police confirmed that they were treating the temple's destruction as an arson attack. It was the fourth Hindu temple destroyed by arson within two weeks in Fiji. The Fiji Times published an editorial condemning the destruction of a local "landmark" by "thugs" and calling upon "the leaders of Christian churches [to] make an immediate and unequivocal call on their members to desist from the temple burning which continue to plague our nation".
