= Jennifer Taylor (architect) =

Australian architect, professor, critic and author

- Born: Jennifer Evelyn Bogle; 12 April 1935; Manly, New South Wales, Australia
- Died: 7 December 2015 (aged 80)
- Education: University of Washington
- Occupation: Architect
- Spouse: Tom Taylor (m. 1957–1997)
- Partner: James Conner
- Children: Faith, Michael
- Projects: Australian Architecture Since 1960 (1986)

Jennifer Evelyn Taylor (née Bogle; 12 April 1935 – 7 December 2015) was an Australian architect, professor, critic and author who made a significant contribution to writing on contemporary Australian, Japanese and South Pacific architecture.

== Biography ==
Australian by birth, Taylor began studying architecture at the School of Architecture, Oxford Brookes University after taking a course in nursing. She then completed a B.Arch (1967) and M.Arch (1969) at the University of Washington, Seattle. Her Master of Architecture (History) was in part by thesis entitled, An Inquiry into Some Aspects of Recent Unorthodox Trends in Architecture.

== Professional career ==
Taylor spent much of her working life in Europe, America and Asia, and taught in architectural schools throughout the world. She was appointed as an academic to the Architecture department of the University of Sydney in the School of Architecture, Design and Planning from 1970 to 1998, and later taught at the Queensland University of Technology, Brisbane. She was awarded the inaugural Royal Australian Institute of Architects (RAIA) National Education Prize in 2000.

Taylor was a founding member of International Council on Monuments and Sites Australia, DOCOMOMO (Australian Working Party for Documentation and Conservation of Buildings, Sites and Neighbourhoods of the Modern Movement) Australia, and the Australian Architectural Association.

Taylor credited the Japanese modernist architect, Fumihiko Maki—whom she first met during a Japan Foundation Professional Fellowship in 1975—as playing a major role in her career. Maki was appointed Taylor’s mentor and after initially looking at contemporary Japanese gardens, she realised, "I became very interested in contemporary architecture in Japan. I loved it. I just kept going back. I started writing on Japan. I have been influenced, unquestionably, by Japanese work."

Taylor was also the first Australian architect to establish a contemporary architectural dialogue with Asia—bringing leading Japanese and Chinese figures to lecture at University of Sydney, and travelling to the region and lecturing there herself.

Taylor contributed extensively to international publications, conferences, architectural criticism, and also sat on numerous architectural juries and competitions. She was awarded the inaugural Royal Australian Institute of Architects (RAIA) Marion Mahony Griffin Prize in 1998—a prize established by the NSW Chapter of the Institute of Architects to "a knowledge a female architect for a distinctive body of architectural work."

In 2010, Taylor was awarded the inaugural Royal Australian Institute of Architects (RAIA) National President’s Prize for her "lifetime commitment to architecture as a thinker, writer, critic and historian."

== Selected publications ==
- An Australian Identity: Houses for Sydney 1953–63 (1972)
- John Andrews: Architecture a Performing Art (with John Andrews, 1982)
- Australian Architecture Since 1960 (1986)
- "Oceania" (ed.), World Architecture 1900–2000: A Critical Mosaic, Volume 10 (1999)
- Tall Buildings 1945–1970: Australian Business Going Up (2001)
- Fumihiko Maki: Space/City/Order/Making (2003)
- Architecture in the South Pacific: The Ocean of Islands (with James Conner, 2014)

== Personal life ==
Taylor's father, James Bogle, was a practicing doctor who also had an early career as a cricketer for Australia. She had two children. Her partner, architect and planner James Conner, survives her.
