= Peter Muller (architect) =

Australian architect (1927–2023)

Peter Muller AO
- Born: 3 July 1927; Leabrook, Adelaide, Australia
- Died: 17 February 2023 (aged 95)
- Education: St Peter's College, Adelaide, 1944; University of Adelaide, 1948; University of Pennsylvania, 1951
- Occupation: Architect
- Known for: Sydney School
- Buildings: Audette House, 1952; Muller House, 1954; Richardson House, 1956; Richardson Ski Lodge, 1959; Hoyts Cinema Centre, 1967; Amandari Hotel, 1989
- Projects: Oberoi Hotels
- Website: petermuller.org

Peter Neil Muller AO (3 July 1927 – 17 February 2023) was an Australian architect with works in Sydney, New South Wales, Victoria, Adelaide, Bali, and Lombok.

== Early life and education ==
Muller was born in the suburb of Leabrook, Adelaide on 3 July 1927. He was educated at St Peter's College from 1942 to 1944. He studied at the University of Adelaide graduating with Bachelor of Engineering degree together with the South Australian School of Mines and Industries graduating with a Fellowship in Architecture in 1948. Muller won the Board of Architectural Education and Royal Australian Institute of Architects travelling scholarship in 1947. He won a Fulbright Scholarship and was awarded a Graduate Tuition Scholarship at the University of Pennsylvania, Philadelphia in 1950 and 1951, where he obtained a Master of Architecture degree. Muller became an Associate of the Royal British Institute of Architects.

== Career ==
After completing study in the United States Muller began private practice in Sydney in 1952, based in Whale Beach on the Northern Beaches. Muller took an alternative design approach to the then-contemporary modern movement. He travelled and lived in many places around the world which included France, London, Bali, South Australia and Sydney. He had several influences including Adrian Snodgrass (1952), Albert Read (1954) and lastly, Frank Lloyd Wright (1952) whom only "influenced him on the Audette house at the beginning of his practice". In Sydney 1953, Muller worked in his own architectural practice called 'The Office of Peter Muller'. He avoided synthetic finishes and instead used natural materials, as he felt strongly about the Australian landscape. This is reflected in many of his Sydney contemporaries.

Muller later moved to Marulan, New South Wales where he practised at home in his grazing property 'Glenrock'. In 1962 Muller tutored at the University of New South Wales. He worked as a director of the National Capital Branch of the National Capital Development Commission in Canberra from 1975 to 1977. This inspired him to author a book 'The Esoteric Nature of Griffin's Design for Canberra’ in 1976. Later, in 1978, he was the founding Principal of Regional Design and Research and he has acted independently from locations all around the world as a consultant for 'Peter Muller International'.

== Recognition ==
In the 2014 Australia Day Honours, Muller was appointed Officer of the Order of Australia (AO) "for distinguished service to architecture, to the adaptation and preservation of Indigenous design and construction, and to the integration of the built and environmental landscape".

== Personal life and death ==
In 1953, Muller married Rosemary Winn Patrick. They had three children named Peter, Suzy, and James. In 1964, they divorced and he married Carole Margaret Mason, whom he also divorced in 1991. He remarried, but three years after the death of his third wife, Helen Hayes, in 2001, he returned to Sydney and reunited with Carole.

Muller died on 17 February 2023, at the age of 95.

== Notable projects ==
=== Richardson House, 1956 ===
949 Barrenjoey Road, Palm Beach, Sydney, Australia

Like many of Peter Muller's designs, the Richardson House began with extensive research of the site. Muller designed this house to sit on the edge of a cliff face, seven metres below the adjoining road and fifteen metres above the water. One design key was the use of circles as the primary motif. This motif came from the form of a large rock already on the site. Twenty-nine hollow cylinders, made of curved concrete blocks and of a natural grey and green appearance, made up the main support system. Muller was a designer of organic architecture and all of the interior spaces of this design are connected and freely flowing.

=== Hoyts Cinema Centre, 1966 ===
134-144 Bourke Street, Melbourne, Australia

The Hoyts Cinema Centre, designed in 1966 and completed in 1969, is considered unique due to the shape of the building, taking similar traits to an upside down oriental pagoda was seen to be of considerable interest in the local area. In fact the design was based on a structural idea of bracketing each floor out similar to the way in which very wide eave overhangs were created in Chinese and Japanese roofs. This particular building is the largest built project by Peter Muller and was the first 'cinema centre' of its kind in Australia; housing three screens in the complex.

== Complete list of works ==
| Design Year | Project | Address | Type | Notes |
|---|---|---|---|---|
| 1952 | Audette House | 265 Edinburgh Road, Castlecrag, Sydney | Residential | |
| 1952 | Olympic Stadium Competition | Melbourne, Victoria | Competition | With Adrian Snodgrass |
| 1953 | Molinari House | Forestville, Sydney | Residential | For Mr FA Molinari (unbuilt) |
| 1954 | Winns Department Store | Ware Street and Spencer Street, Fairfield, Sydney | Commercial | Closed 1981, redeveloped. |
| 1954 | Muller House | 42 Bynya Road, Whale Beach, Sydney | Residential | 1995 addition by Glenn Murcutt and Wendy Lewin, 2022 addition by Peter Stutchbury. |
| 1955 | Walcott House | 40 Bynya Road, Whale Beach, Sydney | Residential | Arts and Architecture, House of the Year, 1956 |
| 1955 | Palm Beach Real Estate Agency | Palm Beach, Sydney | Commercial | Unbuilt |
| 1955 | Barnaby House | Beaumont, Texas, USA | Residential | Unbuilt |
| 1955 | Slyper House | Holland | Residential | Unbuilt |
| 1956 | Barker House | Lot 40, Grand View Drive, Newport | Residential | Unbuilt, for Mr & Mrs George Barker. |
| 1956 | Richardson House ('Kumale') | 949 Barrenjoey Road, Palm Beach, Sydney | Residential | For Mervyn Victor Richardson |
| 1956 | Sydney Opera House Competition Entry | Bennelong Point, Sydney | Competition | |
| 1957 | McGrath House | 4 Dunara Gardens, Point Piper, Sydney | Residential | For Walter & Joan McGrath. Added to NSW State Heritage Registry in May 2025. |
| 1957 | Nicholson House | 5 Angophora Crescent, Forestville, Sydney | Residential | |
| 1957 | Commonwealth Bank branch | 176 Victoria Street, Taree, New South Wales | Commercial | Client: H. C. Coombs. Substantially modified street frontage. Original mural by Byram Mansell 'Bilinga and the Fig Tree' still insitu. |
| 1957 | Commonwealth Bank branch | Eastwood, Sydney | Commercial | Client: H. C. Coombs (unbuilt) |
| 1957 | Coogee Apartment Block | Coogee, Sydney | Residential | For Dr R. Stewart-Jones (unbuilt). |
| 1958 | Walker House | 21 Arterial Road, St Ives, Sydney | Residential | For Mr & Mrs John Walker |
| 1958 | Palm Beach Kindergarten | 1053 Barrenjoey Road, Palm Beach, New South Wales | School | |
| 1958 | Victa Lawnmowers Head Office | 318 Horsley Road, Milperra, Sydney | Commercial | For Mervyn Victor Richardson. Demolished. |
| 1958 | Ward House | 200 Foote Street, Templestowe, Melbourne, Victoria | Residential | For Pauline Ward. Demolished 2015. One of only two houses designed by Muller in Victoria, and the only one in the Melbourne metropolitan area. |
| 1959 | Sculfer House | 3 Livistona Lane, Palm Beach, Sydney | Residential | |
| 1959 | Richardson Ski Lodge 'Manohara' (now Wombiana Chalet) | 5 Buckwong Place, Thredbo Village, NSW | Residential | For Garry Richardson (son of Mervyn Victor Richardson) |
| 1959 | Fogarty House | 'Dunalister Stud', 4979 Northern Highway, Runnymede, Elmore, Victoria | Residential | |
| 1960 | Southside Plaza Shopping Centre | 1 Rockdale Plaza Drive, Rockdale, Sydney | Commercial | Opened 15 August 1963. Demolished 1992 and redeveloped. |
| 1960 | Southside Plaza Shopping Centre Ten Pin Bowling Centre | 1 Rockdale Plaza Drive, Rockdale, Sydney | Commercial | |
| 1960 | McGrath/O'Neill Ski Lodge (now Obergugl Lodge) | 8 Buckwong Place, Thredbo Village, NSW | Residential | Clients: Mr Dennis O'Neill and Mr & Mrs Walter McGrath. Substantially modified in 2008 and 'disowned' by Muller. DA submitted with further design changes in May 2019 (DA 7926). |
| 1960 | Gunning House | 369 Edinburgh Road, Castlecrag, NSW | Residential | Demolished. |
| 1960 | Hoyts Cinema Centre | Newcastle, NSW | Commercial | Unbuilt. |
| 1960—1978 | Eight Craftbuilt Prototype Houses | Various locations | Residential | Prototype houses. |
| 1961 | Patrick House | 10 The Scarp, Castlecrag, Sydney | Residential | Demolished |
| 1961 | Park House | Lot 24, Prince Alfred Parade, Newport, Sydney | Residential | |
| 1962 | Creaser House | 1 Womerah Street, Turramurra, Sydney | Residential | For Mr & Mrs Bod Creaser |
| 1962 | Hamilton House | 3 Pindari Place, Bayview, Sydney | Residential | Built on 4300m^{2} site adjacent to houses by Ian McKay and Bruce Rickard. Placed on interim Heritage Order in 2015. |
| 1962 | Purcell House | 14 Fisher Street, Balgowlah, Sydney | Residential | |
| 1962 | Lance House 1 | 4 Lindsay Avenue, Darling Point, Sydney | Residential | For Dr & Mrs Jim Lance. Demolished 2006 (Michael Dysart). |
| 1962 | Barling House | 4 Paradise Ave, Clareville, Sydney | Residential | |
| 1963 | Barton House | 22 Morella Place, Castle Cove, Sydney | Residential | For Mr & Mrs Gordon Barton. Highly altered interior and exterior. Roof tiles replaced and sandstock bricks rendered, extended to rear. |
| 1963 | Green House | 7 Wolseley Road, Point Piper, Sydney | Residential | |
| 1963 | Walder House 1 (Weekender) | Lot 3, Cabarita Road, Stokes Point, Avalon Beach, Sydney | Residential | For Sam & Di Walder. Demolished. |
| 1964 | Lance House 2 | 15 Coolong Road, Vaucluse, Sydney | Residential | Demolished 2019. |
| 1964 | Mitchell House | 20 Robe Terrace, Medindie, Adelaide | Residential | |
| 1964 | Turner House | 57 Sylvan Avenue, East Lindfield | Residential | |
| 1964 | IPEC Head Office | 259 Glen Osmond Road, Frewville, Adelaide | Commercial | |
| 1964–1984 | 'Glenrock' homestead | 248 Highland Way, Marulan, NSW | Restoration | Owned by Peter Muller. 1830s colonial mansion on 990 hectares with Hereford cattle. Sold in 1984 for $1.6m. Muller later published a book about the property in 2010. |
| 1964 | Greenwood House | Mulgowrie Avenue, Balgowlah, Sydney | Residential | |
| 1965 | Walder House 2 | 61a Kambala Road, Bellevue Hill, Sydney | Residential | For Sam & Di Walder. Acquired by Kerry Packer and demolished to expand his garden. |
| 1965 | IPEC Airfreight Terminal | Launceston, Tasmania | Commercial | |
| 1965 | Carroll House | 6 Rockbath Road, Palm Beach, Sydney | Residential | |
| 1965 | McArthur House | 11 The Tor Walk, Castlecrag, Sydney | Residential | |
| 1966 | Dickson Hotel | Dickson, Canberra, ACT | Hotel | Demolished. |
| 1966 | Hoyts Drive-in Theatre Tamworth | Duri Road and Hillvue Road, Tamworth West, NSW | Commercial | Closed 1984, later demolished. |
| 1967 | Hoyts Drive-in Theatre Casula | 25 Pine Road, Casula, Sydney | Commercial | Closed 1985. |
| 1967 | Hoyts Cinema Centre | 134—144 Bourke Street, Melbourne | Commercial | Interiors by Neville Marsh. Opened 1969, closed 2005. |
| 1968 | McGrath House | 8 Castra Place, Double Bay, Sydney | Residential | |
| 1968 | Hoyts Drive-in Theatre Bulleen/Doncaster | 49 Greenaway Street, Bulleen, Melbourne, Victoria | Commercial | Closed 1984, redeveloped 2022. |
| 1968 | Hoyts Drive-in Theatre Wantirna | Mountain Highway and Boronia Road, Wantirna, Victoria | Commercial | Closed 1984. Converted to outdoor market. |
| 1968 | Regent and Paris Theatres & Regent Arcade (Hoyts) | Rundle Street, Adelaide | Commercial | Later redesigned by local architects and rebuilt. |
| 1968 | Walsh House | 7 St Andrews Drive, Glen Osmond, Adelaide, South Australia | Residential | |
| 1968 | Schwartz House | 39 Palmerston Street, Watsons Bay, Sydney | Residential | |
| 1969 | Townhouses | Trelawney Street, Woollahra, Sydney | Residential | |
| 1969 | Turner House | 8 Sylvan Avenue, East Lindfield, Sydney | Residential | |
| 1969–1971 | Five projects for Tony Bambridge | Tahiti | Various | Client: Tony Bambridge |
| 1970 | Matahari Hotel | Sanur Beach, Bali | Hotel | |
| 1970 | Dulhunty Homestead | Nant Lodge, Glen Innes, NSW | Residential | |
| 1970 | Steidler House | 7a Wentworth Street, Point Piper, Sydney | Residential | Modified street frontage c.2017. |
| 1970 | Winderadeen Homestead restoration and manager's house | 5178 Federal Highway, Collector, NSW | Restoration | For Mr & Mrs Garner Anthony, Honolulu |
| 1970 | Coolangatta Apartment Tower | Coolangatta, Queensland | Residential | Unbuilt |
| 1971 | Snider House | 12 Wolseley Road, Point Piper, Sydney | Residential | Modified, timber painted. |
| 1971 | Woolf House | 8 Gilliver Avenue, Vaucluse, Sydney | Residential | Demolished August 2014. |
| 1971 | Burrell Homestead | Rockdale, Armidale, NSW | Residential | |
| 1972 | Peter Muller House | Campuan, Bali, Indonesia | Residential | Architect's own house. |
| 1972–87 | Peter Muller house | Campuan, Bali, Indonesia | Restoration | Architect's own house. |
| 1973 | Kayu Aya Hotel | Kayu Aya Beach, Seminyak, Bali, Indonesia | Hotel | Developed in to Bali Oberoi from 1977. |
| 1975–77 | Director, National Capital Development Commission | Canberra, ACT | Consultancy | Established Australian Parliament House design competition terms of reference. |
| 1977 | Peter Muller house | Unawatuna Beach (Galle), Sri Lanka | Restoration | Architect's own house. |
| 1977–2001 | The Bali Oberoi (Kayu Aya Club) | Seminyak Beach, Bali, Indonesia | Hotel | Continuous upgrading of Kayu Aya Hotel |
| 1978 | Establishment of Regional Design and Research (RDR) | | Practice | Founding of design practice. |
| 1978 | Lian Cove Beach Hotel | Batangas, Luzon, Philippines | Hotel | Unbuilt |
| 1978 | 1,200 luxury housing settlement | Jubail, Saudi Arabia | Residential | Unbuilt |
| 1979 | Peter Muller House | Unawatuna Beach via Galle, Sri Lanka | Residential | Architect's own house; begun 1977 |
| 1979 | Travelodge Beachcomber Condominium Apartments | Papeete, Tahiti | Residential | Unbuilt |
| 1980 | The Oberoi Kolva Beach resort hotel | Goa, India | Hotel | with Sharad Madan (India) |
| 1982 | Karnak Oberoi Hotel | Luxor, Egypt | Hotel | Unbuilt |
| 1982 | Si-Rusa Resort Hotel Development | Port Dickson, Malaysia | Hotel | Unbuilt |
| 1983 | 67 Townhouses | 300 Cottesloe Drive (Sailfish Point), Mermaid Waters, Gold Coast, Queensland | Residential | For Burleigh Forest Estate, unbuilt. |
| 1985 | Williams House | 64 Minkara Road, Bayview Heights, Sydney | Residential | With Mike Harris (Spooner Harris Bryant) |
| 1989 | Amandari Hotel | Jalan Raya Kedewatan, Kabupaten Gianyar, Ubud, Bali | Hotel | |
| 1994 | Amandari Village (13 luxury estates) | Kedewatan, Bali, Indonesia | Residential | |
| 1995–1998 | Antap West Bali Luxury housing estate | West Bali, Indonesia | Residential | Unbuilt |
| 1995–1998 | The Oberoi Ubud | Bali, Indonesia | Hotel | Unbuilt |
| 1995–1998 | The Oberoi Bedugal | Bali, Indonesia | Hotel | Unbuilt |
| 1995–1998 | Canyon Ranch Health Complex | West Bali, Indonesia | Hotel | with James Christou and Partners (Perth), unbuilt. |
| 1996 | Club Med Vanuatu | Vanuatu | Hotel | with AJC Architects, unbuilt. |
| 1997 | The Oberoi Beach Resort, Lombok | Medana, Tanjung, North Lombok Regency, West Nusa Tenggara, Lombok, Indonesia | Hotel | |
| 1997–2003 | 'Kookynie' homestead | 488 Muanu Road via Outa-Wurta Road, Boconnoc Park/Blyth, Clare Valley, South Australia | Restoration | For Peter Muller (new outhouses) |
| 1997–2003 | Hayes Lodge | Loches, France | Restoration | Originally built 1679; Restoration for Helen Hayes. |
| 1998 | Canyon Ranch Health complex | Masala Alam, Red Sea, Egypt | Institutional | |
| 1998 | Amandari Village Show Villa | Kedewatan, Bali, Indonesia | Residential | Show villa built. |
| 2007 | Prickle Farm | Ilford, NSW | Residential | For daughter Suzy Flowers. |

== Publications ==
=== Publications by Peter Muller ===
- The Esoteric Nature of Griffin's Design for Canberra, Canberra 1976
- The New and Permanent Parliament House, with others, Canberra 1977
- Canberra and the New Parliament House, with others, Dee Why West, New South Wales 1983
- Glenrock, Marulan, Sydney, New South Wales, Walsh Bay Press, 2014

=== Publications about Peter Muller ===
Books

- An Australian identity: houses for Sydney, 1953-63 by Jennifer Taylor, Sydney 1972
- Fine Houses of Sydney by Robert Irving, John Kinstler and Max Dupain, Sydney 1982
- Architecture Bali by Bingham-Hall, Pesaro Publications 2000
- Peter Muller by Jacqueline C. Urford (398 pages) 2013

Articles

- "Molinari House" in Architecture and Arts (Melbourne), July 1954
- "Audette House" in Architecture in Australia (Sydney), July/September 1955
- Special issue on Peter Muller in Architecture and Arts (Melbourne), December 1955
- "Peter Muller House" in Architecture in Australia (Sydney), January/March 1956
- "Richardson House" in Architecture and Arts (Melbourne), August 1956
- "House by Peter Muller" in La Architettura (Rome), August 1958
- "Craftbuilt Houses" in Architecture in Australia (Sydney), September 1961
- Article by David Saunders in Art and Architecture (Sydney), June 1971
- Numerous illustrated articles in The Australian Home Beautiful, Vogue Australia/ France, Belle, 1955–1999

Theses

- "Peter Muller Domestic Architecture – The First Ten Years" by J.C.Urford 1984, in 6 Volumes, University of Sydney
- "The Architecture of Peter Muller " by J.C. Urford 1993 in 9 Volumes, University of Sydney
- "Discriminating Eyes in Bali, Indonesia" by Vanessa R. Preisler, University of Oregon, U.S.A.

== See also ==
- Sydney School
