= Brumby Aircruiser =

General information
- Type: Four-seat general aviation aircraft
- National origin: Australia
- Manufacturer: Brumby Aircraft Australia
- Designer: Henry Millicer (original Victa Aircruiser)
- Status: Development programme

History
- Developed from: Victa Aircruiser
- Variants: Proposed piston and turboprop variants

Brumby Aircruiser is a proposed four-seat general aviation aircraft under development by Brumby Aircraft Australia. It is derived from the 1960s Victa Aircruiser, itself developed from the Victa Airtourer.

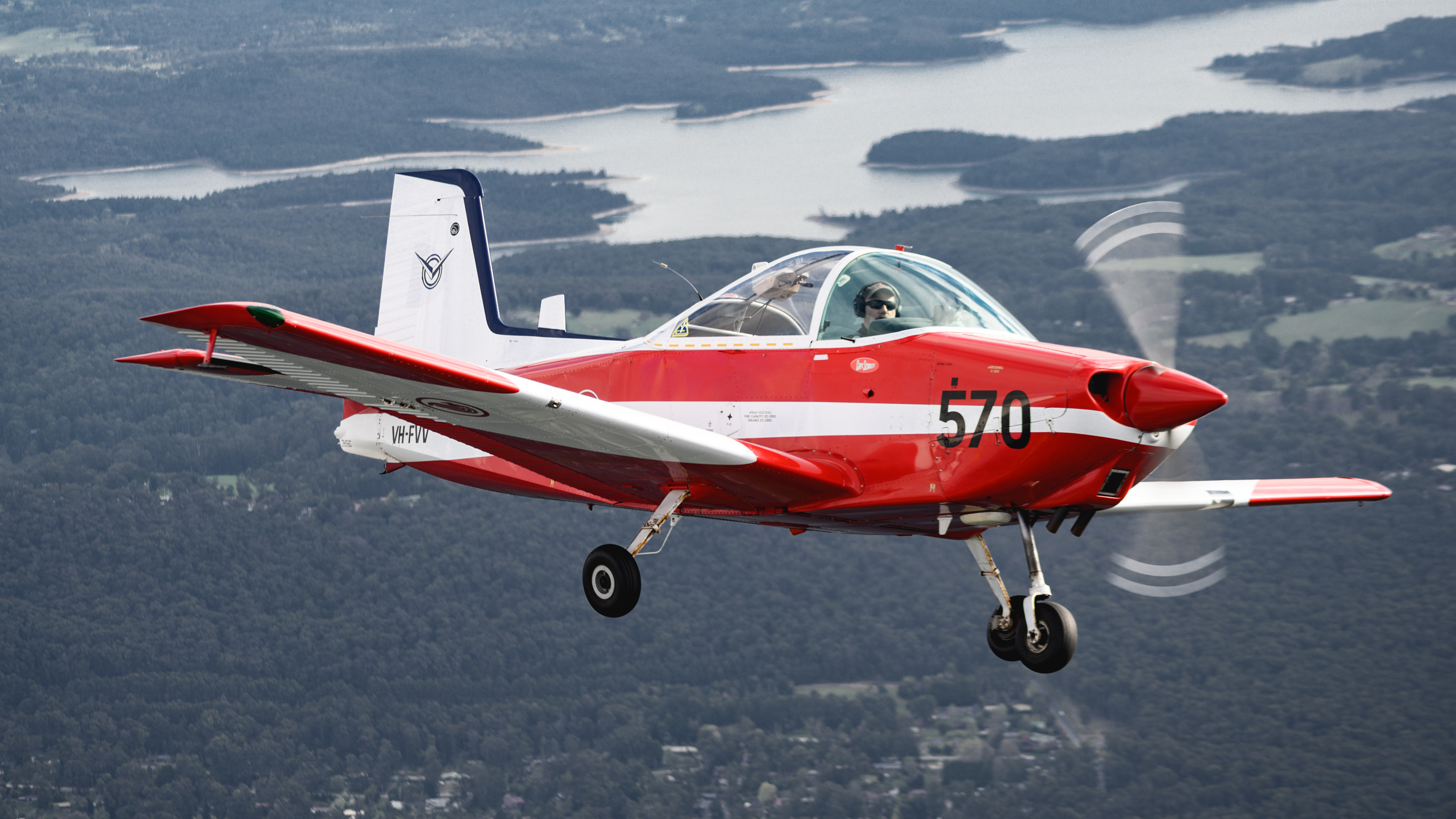
Victa/AESL Airtourer, the predecessor design from which the Aircruiser lineage was developed.

== Design and development ==
The original Victa Aircruiser was designed by Henry Millicer. A single example was completed in 1966, but production did not proceed and Victa ceased aircraft manufacture in 1967 after the Australian government declined to provide tariff protection for locally manufactured aircraft. Elements of the design were later developed into the PAC CT/4 Airtrainer.

In 2013, Brumby Aircraft Australia acquired the type certificate for the Victa Aircruiser design and announced plans to modernise the aircraft with updated systems and multiple powerplant options.

Brumby later announced an agreement with China's Aviation Industry Corporation of China (AVIC) involving engineering collaboration associated with the Aircruiser programme and Brumby’s operations at Cowra, New South Wales. Aviation press reporting described the arrangement as coinciding with expanded production activity in China for some existing Brumby models, while development work on the Aircruiser continued in Australia.

== Variants ==
Brumby has outlined several proposed variants:

- A 210 hp (160 kW) Continental IO-360 piston-powered version intended for training and touring roles.
- A 310 hp (230 kW) Continental IO-550 powered version intended for higher-performance touring.
- A turbine variant powered by a derated Rolls-Royce M250 (formerly Allison 250) engine producing approximately 205 kW (275 hp), driving a three-bladed propeller, intended for business use.

== Certification and status ==
Brumby has stated that the modernised design is intended to meet certification requirements comparable to FAR Part 23 through certification with Australia’s Civil Aviation Safety Authority. Public reporting in the mid-2010s described the project as being in a design and development phase.

== See also ==
- Victa Aircruiser
- Victa Airtourer
- PAC CT/4
- Brumby Aircraft Australia
