= Brumby Aircraft Australia =

- Company type: Proprietary limited company
- Industry: Aerospace manufacturing
- Founded: 2004
- Headquarters: Cowra, Australia
- Key people: Paul Goard (Managing Director)
- Products: Light aircraft
- Website: http://brumbyaircraft.com.au

Brumby Aircraft Australia is an Australian aircraft manufacturer that produces a range of kit- and ready-built civil light aircraft. The company is based at Cowra Airport in the Central West of New South Wales and has also signed partnership agreements with Aviation Industry Corporation of China to manufacture light sport aircraft in China for domestic markets.

== History ==
Phil Goard designed and built an aircraft called the Goair Trainer at Bankstown Airport in Sydney during the 1990s. The single aircraft was later modified in 2001 into the Goair GT-1, a prototype which would form the basis of the Model J544. In 2004, Goard relocated to Cowra and registered the company name Brumby Aircraft Australia. The first Model J544, known simply as the Brumby after a wild horse was registered under a Recreational Aviation Australia certificate in October 2005 and was publicly demonstrated in April 2006. In 2010, the company announced a high-wing variant of the design, designated the Brumby 610 Evolution. The J544 was retrospectively given the designation Brumby 600.

In 2013 it was announced the company had purchased the type certificate for the Victa Aircruiser 210, a four-seat general aviation aeroplane designed in the 1960s, which never saw large scale production - although the design was later developed into the successful PAC CT/4 Airtrainer. Brumby anticipate an updated version of this aircraft will compete with the Cirrus SR22, while the company also announced plans to develop a turboprop powered variant aimed at a niche business market with no established competitors. The Aircruiser also represents a significant step for the company beyond ultralight and recreational aircraft as the design has certification by the Civil Aviation Safety Authority meeting the equivalent to the Federal Aviation Administration FAR 23 in the United States.

A major 40-year deal was signed in 2014 with the Chinese government owned AVIC to produce the Brumby 600 and 610 aircraft in a purpose-built facility in Fujian Province. The facility will build the light sport aircraft for the Chinese domestic markets, while also providing components for assembly in the Australian market. The joint venture is expected to meet a demand for 280 aircraft over the first four years of the program, and will reduce the time taken to deliver new aircraft from 12 months to approximately 8 weeks. The Aircruiser design was not included in the deal, as Brumby intends to utilise the additional capacity at its Cowra facility to focus on development and production of this model In addition to production facilities, the agreement is also reported to include global sales and support, as well as Brumby's participation in the research and development of a new all-composite seaplane intended to carry 10-20 passengers, addressing a gap identified in the Chinese general aviation market.

In 2017, Brumby moved its manufacturing operations to a new $20 million factory in Fuzhou, China. The facility has the capacity to scale production up to 400 per aircraft per year, beginning with the Brumby 610 design. The company indicated it intended to maintain facilities in Cowra for final assembly, fit-out, distribution and service.

== Aircraft ==
- Brumby Aircruiser - A proposed development of the Victa Aircruiser announced in 2014. Single engine, four-seat business/touring aircraft to be offered in both piston and turboprop versions.
- Brumby 600 - Two-seat light sport aircraft available in factory built or amateur built kits.
- Brumby 610 Evolution - High wing variant of the Brumby 600 designed specifically for flight training.
