= Victa R-2 =

R-2
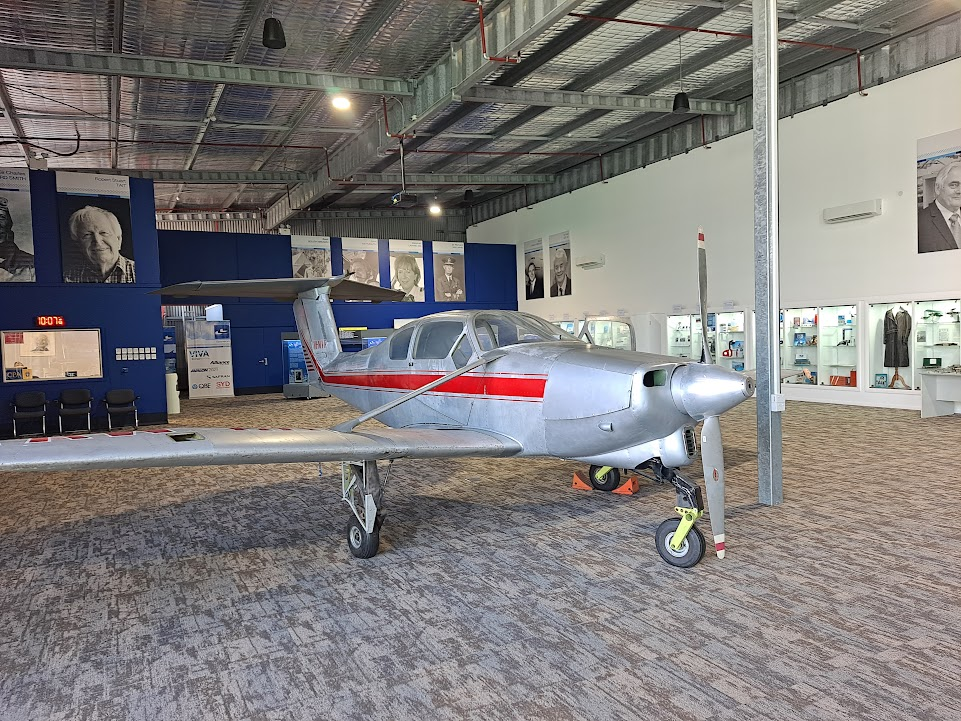
- The prototype Victa R-2 on display at the HARS Museum

General information
- Type: Light aircraft
- National origin: Australia
- Manufacturer: Victa Ltd.
- Designer: Luigi Pellarini
- Status: Prototype only
- Number built: 1

History
- First flight: 15 February 1961

The Victa R-2 was a prototype Australian single-engine four-seat light aircraft built by Victa Ltd in the early 1960s. A single example was built, first flying in February 1961, but no production followed.

== Design and development ==
In September 1959, the Australian engineering company Victa Consolidated Industries, a major manufacturer of motor lawnmowers, established an aviation department. The first intended product was the Victa R-2, a four-seat single-engine light aircraft designed by Luigi Pellarini. Pellarini's design was a low-winged, all metal tractor configuration monoplane with a T-tail, powered by a 180 hp (130 kW) Lycoming O-360 flat-four piston engine driving a constant-speed propeller. The prototype's wings were braced by struts, although production aircraft may have had fully cantilever wings. The wingtips and tail were raked to reduce drag. A retractable tricycle landing gear was fitted, although the production of versions with fixed landing gear was considered for operations in the bush.

A prototype first flew on 15 February 1961, by which time Victa had received several orders for the R-2. Despite these orders, no production followed. Victa had committed to production of the two-seat Airtourer (which had been ordered in much larger numbers than the R-2), and chose to develop a four-seater derivative of the Airtrainer, the Aircruiser, which was expected to be cheaper to build than the R-2, instead of continuing to develop the R-2. Pellarini left Victa, and later went on to design the Transavia PL-12 Airtruk agricultural biplane, although attempts by Pellarini to build a development of the R-2 as the Transavia PL-13 were unsuccessful.

== Specifications (Performance estimated) ==
Data from Jane's All the World's Aircraft 1961–62

General characteristics

- Crew: 1 pilot
- Capacity: 3 passengers
- Length: 21 ft 6 in (6.55 m)
- Wingspan: 32 ft 0 in (9.75 m)
- Height: 8 ft 3 in (2.51 m)
- Wing area: 132 sq ft (12.3 m^{2})
- Aspect ratio: 7.7:1
- Empty weight: 1,190 lb (540 kg)
- Gross weight: 2,250 lb (1,021 kg)
- Powerplant: 1 × Lycoming O-360-A1A air-cooled flat four, 180 hp (130 kW)

Performance

- Maximum speed: 183 mph (295 km/h, 159 kn) at sea level
- Cruise speed: 174 mph (280 km/h, 151 kn) at 5,000 ft (1,500 m) (75% power)
- Stall speed: 56 mph (90 km/h, 49 kn) (flaps down)
- Range: 740 mi (1,190 km, 640 nmi)
- Service ceiling: 16,600 ft (5,100 m)
- Rate of climb: 1,160 ft/min (5.9 m/s)
