= City of Canada Bay Museum =

Local history museum in Sydney, Australia

Coordinates: 33.855469°S 151.104369°E

City Of Canada Bay Museum

Inside the City Of Canada Bay Museum

The City of Canada Bay Museum is located in Sydney, Australia, in the suburb of Concord.

The original museum was located on Wellbank Street, Concord and opened in 2000. The museum was officially re-opened on Saturday 16 May 2009 after moving to its new premises now located in the old Concord library at Bent Street. The museum has a collection that has been sourced from various locations with artifacts that range from 1915 to the 1970s. Included in the collection are items that showcase the history of Canada Bay and its surrounding suburbs such as Arnott’s and Bushells memorabilia. It includes displays of contemporary history, and information on the local history.

With the assistance from the Concord Heritage Society, the Drummoyne Historical Society and community members, the collection includes an extensive collection of toys, material from the First and Second World Wars, household items and office items, various silver and china collections, extensive sports memorabilia, local industry items such as the Victa lawn mower and one of the last brass firefighters' helmets to be made in Australia before they were officially phased out.

The museum has the 128th Victa lawn mower, invented by Mervyn Victor Richardson, which was based on the Mowhall mower.

The museum is located at 1 Bent Street, Concord, Sydney, New South Wales 2138

== See also ==
- Concord, New South Wales
- City of Canada Bay
