= Brumby 610 Evolution =

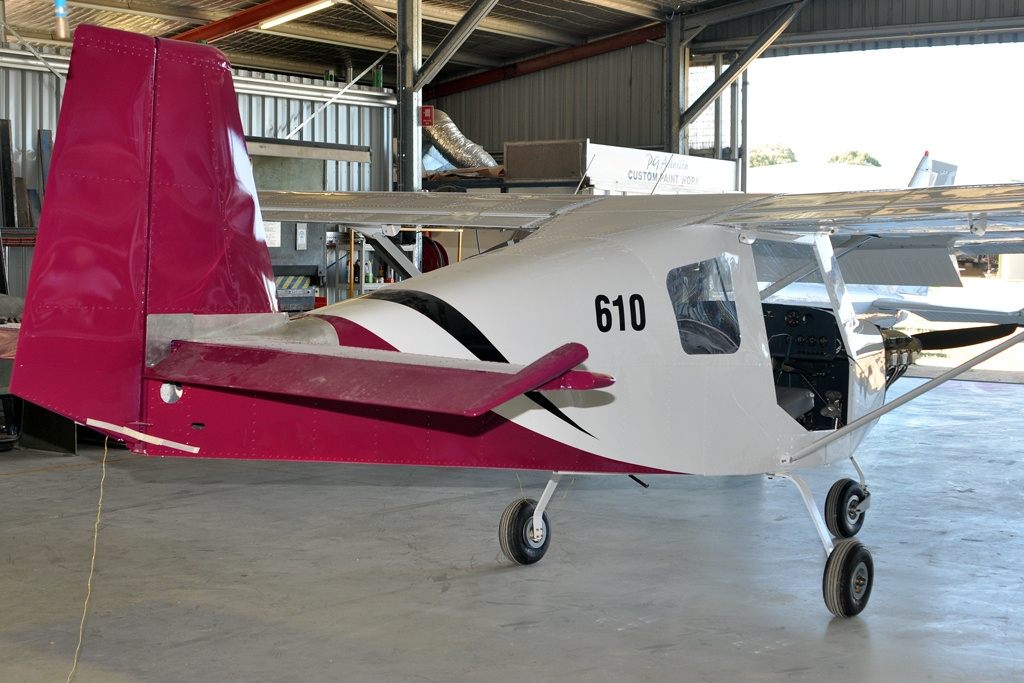

General information
- Type: Training and Light sport aircraft
- National origin: Australia
- Manufacturer: Brumby Aircraft Australia
- Designer: Phil Goard
- Status: In production
- Number built: 8 as of 2014

History
- Introduction date: 2010
- First flight: March 2011
- Developed from: Brumby 600

The Brumby Aircraft Brumby 610 Evolution is an Australian single-engined, two-seat, training or touring, cabin monoplane of all-metal construction. The aircraft is built by Brumby Aircraft Australia as a production or kit aircraft at Cowra Airport, Australia.

== Design and development ==
Announced in 2010, the Brumby 610 is essentially a high-wing development of the Brumby 600, featuring a slightly larger fuel capacity and heavy-duty undercarriage components. Designed primarily as a trainer to focus on landing phases, the Brumby 610 also displays benign stall characteristics, with a lower landing speed than the Brumby 600, and a stall speed of 38 knots (70 km/h). It has fixed tricycle landing gear and seating for two in side-by-side configuration, with doors on each side of the cabin. The Brumby 610 is available with two powerplants; the 100 to 116 hp (75 to 87 kW) Lycoming IO-233 or 100 hp (75 kW) Rotax 912 series engine, driving a two or three bladed propeller. Unlike the Brumby 600, the Brumby 610 is not offered with the Jabiru 3300 engine option. The prototype was first flown under Recreational Aviation Australia registration in March 2011, and by 2014 eight had been delivered, either as kits or complete aircraft. A factory built Brumby 610 was the first aircraft in Australia to be fitted with the Lycoming O-233 engine.

== Specifications ==
Data from Jane's All The World's Aircraft

General characteristics

- Crew: 1
- Capacity: 2 (including pilot)
- Length: 6.10 m (20 ft 0 in)
- Wingspan: 8.53 m (28 ft 0 in)
- Wing area: 10.9 m^{2} (117 sq ft)
- Empty weight: 350 kg (771 lb)
- Gross weight: 600 kg (1,322 lb)
- Powerplant: 1 × various piston engines, see text.
- Maximum speed: 259 km/h (161 mph, 140 kn)
- Cruise speed: 204 km/h (127 mph, 110 kn)
- Stall speed: 71 km/h (44 mph, 38 kn)
- Endurance: 6 hours
- Rate of climb: 5.1 m/s (1,000 ft/min) (at sea level)
