= Henry Millicer =

Polish-Australian aircraft designer (1915–1996)

Henry K. Millicer
- Born: Henryk Kazimierz Milicer; 11 June 1915; Warsaw, Poland
- Died: 28 August 1996 (aged 81); Melbourne, Australia
- Education: Imperial College
- Engineering career
- Discipline: Aeronautical engineering
- Employer(s): Państwowe Zakłady Lotnicze (PZL); RWD; Airspeed Ltd. Percival Aircraft Company; Government Aircraft Factories; Victa; RMIT University
- Projects: Percival Provost (associated); Victa Airtourer; Victa Aircruiser
- Awards: AM; Polish Military Medal (as reported)

Henry Millicer (seated, right) in a prototype wooden buck of the Airtourer, 1957. (Museums Victoria)

Henry K. Millicer, AM (11 June 1915 – 28 August 1996), born Henryk Kazimierz Milicer, was a Polish-born Australian aeronautical engineer, aircraft designer and pilot. He worked in Europe before migrating to Australia in 1950, later contributing to the development of the Victa Airtourer and the Victa Aircruiser.

== Early life and education ==
Millicer was born in Warsaw, Poland. He developed an early interest in aviation and trained as a glider pilot while still a teenager. After completing studies in aeronautical engineering, he worked as a junior designer at Państwowe Zakłady Lotnicze (PZL) and later at the Polish manufacturer RWD.

== Second World War ==
Millicer served as a reserve officer and flew during the opening phase of the Second World War. After the invasion of Poland in 1939, he escaped via Romania and eventually reached France and the United Kingdom, where he flew with Polish units associated with the Royal Air Force. He was later injured in a training accident and subsequently undertook other duties, including liaison and interpreting work.

In 1941, he married Krystyna Paciorkowska.

== Aeronautical engineering and academic career ==
In 1943, Millicer received support to undertake postgraduate study in aeronautical engineering at Imperial College London. He joined Airspeed Ltd. in 1945 and later worked for the Percival Aircraft Company.

In 1950, he migrated to Australia and became chief aerodynamicist at the Government Aircraft Factories (GAF). His work at GAF included involvement with the Jindivik target drone programme and the Malkara missile project.

During the 1950s, Millicer and colleagues entered a design competition sponsored by the Royal Aero Club of London for a replacement for the de Havilland Chipmunk. Their design was developed into the Victa Airtourer.

Millicer also developed a four-seat derivative design, the Victa Aircruiser, for which a prototype was built and flown in 1966. The concept later informed the New Zealand-developed PAC CT/4 military trainer after the Victa programme ended.

Millicer later joined the Royal Melbourne Institute of Technology (RMIT, now RMIT University) as a lecturer in aeronautics and contributed to the development of its teaching and research activities in aeronautical engineering.

== Later life ==
Millicer retired in 1980 but remained associated with aeronautical engineering education and aircraft design. In 1984, he received an honorary doctorate from RMIT, and in 1992 he was appointed a Member of the Order of Australia.

Millicer died in 1996. According to published accounts, his ashes were scattered from an aircraft near Anglesea, Victoria, off the Great Ocean Road.
