= Brumby 600 =

Australian light-sport aircraft

General information
- Type: Light sport aircraft
- National origin: Australia
- Manufacturer: Brumby Aircraft Australia
- Designer: Phil Goard

History
- First flight: October 2005
- Developed from: Goair Trainer

The Brumby Aircraft Brumby 600, also known as the Brumby LSA 600, is an Australian single-engined, two-seat, training or touring cabin monoplane. The aircraft is built by Brumby Aircraft Australia as a production or kit aircraft at Cowra Airport near Cowra, New South Wales, Australia. Designed to meet regulations governing light sport aircraft (LSA), it was developed from the Goair Trainer.

== Design and development ==
The Brumby was developed from the GoAir GT-1 Trainer, which was built at Bankstown Airport in Sydney during the late 1990s.

The Brumby 600 is a low-wing monoplane of all-metal construction. It has a fixed tricycle landing gear and an enclosed cockpit for two in side-by-side configuration with a forward-sliding canopy for access; sideways-opening gull-wing doors are available as an optional kit. It can be powered by a 100 to 116 hp (75 to 87 kW) Lycoming IO-233, 100 hp (75 kW) Rotax 912ULS or 120 hp (89 kW) Jabiru 3300 engine, driving a wooden two-blade propeller.

A high-wing version has been developed as the Brumby 610 Evolution.

== Specifications ==
Data from Brumby Aircraft Australia, Jane's All The World's Aircraft

General characteristics

- Crew: 1
- Capacity: 2 (including pilot)
- Length: 6.25 m (20 ft 6 in)
- Wingspan: 8.53 m (28 ft 0 in)
- Height: 2.13 m (7 ft 0 in)
- Wing area: 9.75 m^{2} (105 sq ft)
- Empty weight: 350 kg (771 lb)
- Gross weight: 600 kg (1,322 lb)
- Powerplant: 1 × various piston engines, see text.
- Maximum speed: 259 km/h (161 mph, 140 kn)
- Cruise speed: 204 km/h (127 mph, 110 kn)
- Stall speed: 75 km/h (46 mph, 40 kn)
- Endurance: 5 hours
- Rate of climb: 5.1 m/s (1,000 ft/min)
