= The Mower =

1979 poem by Philip Larkin

The Mower is a poem by British poet Philip Larkin, written on 12 June 1979. It was first published in Humberside, the Hull Literary Club magazine, in Autumn 1979.

The poem describes a moment when the speaker accidentally killed a hedgehog with his lawn mower while mowing his lawn.

Author Maeve Brennan recalled an earlier incident in which Larkin had deliberately killed a hedgehog with his car, and his guilt about it. She linked that incident with the later poem. Author Sisir Kumar Chatterjee writes that the poem embodies Larkin's themes of "mutual care, sympathy, and kindness." Janice Rossen notes this is a recurring theme in his work, citing the similar suffering of a dying rabbit in "Myxomatosis," published in The Less Deceived.

The archive of Philip Larkin's work at University of Hull includes the blue 'Victa' rotary lawn mower involved in the incident that inspired the poem.
