= Mervyn Victor Richardson =

Australian inventor (1893–1972)

- Born: 11 November 1893; Yarramalong, New South Wales, Australia
- Died: 31 December 1972 (aged 79); Darlinghurst, New South Wales, Australia
- Occupation: Industrialist
- Known for: Victa lawn mowers Victa Airtourer; Victa Aircruiser
- Spouse: Vera Marie Bertram
- Children: Garry

Mervyn Victor Richardson (11 November 1893 – 31 December 1972) was an Australian inventor and industrialist. In 1952 he produced a rotary lawn mower that proved popular leading to the formation of the company Victa. He commercialised the mower with creation of Victa Consolidated Industries and later went on to extend the business to include the manufacture of the Victa Airtourer and Victa Aircruiser aircraft and project homes.

== Early life ==
Richardson was born in Yarramalong, New South Wales to Archibald George Heron Richardson, a school teacher from Ireland and his Australian-born wife Charlotte Martha Richardson, née Griffith.

He had many jobs, starting with an apprenticeship as a jeweller and later becoming a car salesman. He created New South Wales Motors Ltd selling Austin motor cars in 1928.

In 1916 he helped his brother Archibald and the staff at the NSW State Aviation School build an aeroplane named 'the Wasp'. His brother built the engine and he along with Harold Eagle, Leslie Hankie and Ted Sparks built the airframe.

In 1948 his son Garry was earning an income by cutting grass while studying at University. To help his son he created two lightweight lawn mowers using a Villiers engine on its side. These mowers proved successful and soon he began a business manufacturing and selling the mowers.
