= Adrian Snodgrass =

Australian architect and Buddhist scholar (1931–2025)

- Born: 2 April 1931; Kyogle, New South Wales, Australia
- Died: 22 January 2025 (aged 93)
- Citizenship: Australia
- Education: Scots College, East Sydney Technical College, University of Sydney MSc (Arch) 1981, PhD 1985
- Occupations: Architect, academic, author, Buddhist scholar, Asian architecture specialist
- Partner: Dr Judith Snodgrass
- Practice: Regional Design and Research (RDR)
- Projects: Buddha: Radiant Awakening exhibition (AGNSW)

Adrian Bousfield Snodgrass (2 April 1931 – 22 January 2025) was an Australian architect and scholar in Buddhist studies and Buddhist art. He developed theories in the area of hermeneutical philosophy and its application to knowledge production and cross-cultural understanding. Snodgrass was co-editor of the journal Architectural Theory Review and Editor of Architectural Theory.

== Life and career ==
Snodgrass was born in Kyogle, New South Wales, Australia in 1931. He was an Honorary Life Member of The Asian Arts Society of Australia (TAASA); President of the Australasian Association for Buddhist Studies (AABS); Research Associate at University of Sydney School of Architecture, Design and Planning; Senior Research Fellow in the School of Languages and Cultures at the same university; and adjunct professor in the Centre for Cultural Research at the University of Western Sydney. Snodgrass died on 22 January 2025, at the age of 93.

== Works ==
Snodgrass is noted for several books on Asian art and symbolism, and for work developing the theme of hermeneutics in relation to architectural design.

His scholarship drew substantially on the work of Martin Heidegger, Hans-Georg Gadamer and numerous Japanese and Indian scholars to demonstrate that for us one of the chief values of historical study, and the study of cultures other than our own, resides in our encounter with their "otherness":

Asian Studies should aim not only to provide a knowledge of language, factual information and skills in critical analysis, but also to foster in a learning and research community the dialectics of interpretation, in which what is alien in the text of the other becomes the starting point for a process of questioning the horizons of our own prejudicial world in the hope of expanding and transforming them.

Architecture, temps et éternité, Traduit de l’anglais par Patrick Marcelot, Éditions i, 2020 (ISBN 978-2-37650-039-1) Architecture hindoue et bouddhiste temps et éternité, Traduit de l’anglais par Patrick Marcelot, Éditions i, 2023 (ISBN 978-2-37650-101-5)
