= Goair Trainer =

Trainer
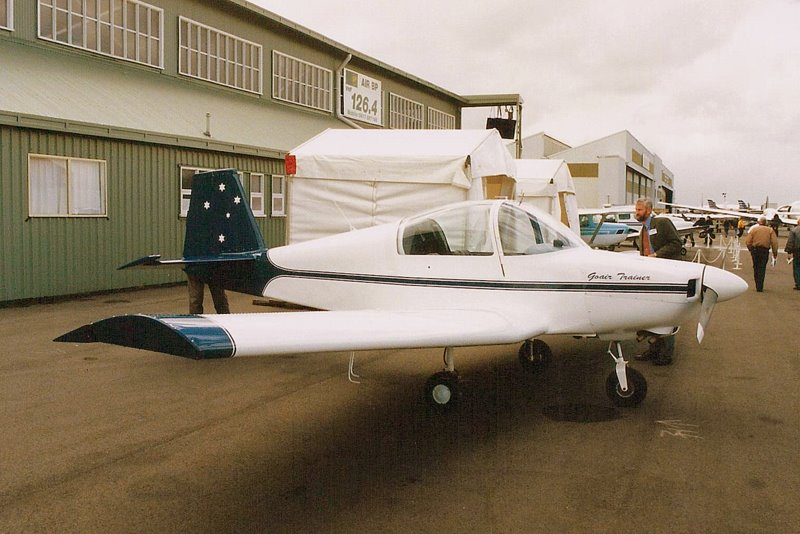
- The first Goair Trainer at an aviation industry trade fair in 1998

General information
- Type: Two-seat training or touring monoplane
- National origin: Australia
- Manufacturer: Goair Products
- Designer: Phil Goard
- Number built: 2

History
- First flight: 1995
- Variant: Brumby Aircraft Brumby 600

The Goair Trainer is an Australian single-engined, two-seat, training or touring cabin monoplane designed and built by Goair Products at Bankstown Airport in Sydney, Australia.

== Design and development ==
The Trainer is a low-wing monoplane, first flown in July 1995 and powered by a 118 hp (88 kW) Lycoming O-235 piston engine driving a two-bladed propeller. It has a fixed tricycle landing gear and an enclosed cockpit for two in side-by-side configuration with a sliding canopy for access.

Flight testing was completed in November 1998; following this a second substantially-modified aircraft was built as the GoAir GT-1 Trainer, using the engine and instruments from the first aircraft. Changes included a wider fuselage and different ailerons and flaps; the GT-1 was eventually developed into the Brumby Aircraft Brumby 600.

== Specifications ==
Data from Jane's All the World's Aircraft 1999-2000

General characteristics

- Crew: 2
- Length: 20 ft 6 in (6.25 m)
- Wingspan: 28 ft 0 in (8.76 m)
- Height: 6 ft 8 in (2.03 m)
- Wing area: 113 sq ft (10.50 m^{2})
- Empty weight: 900 lb (400 kg)
- Gross weight: 1,650 lb (748 kg)
- Powerplant: 1 × Lycoming O-235 flat-four piston engine , 118 hp (88 kW)

Performance

- Maximum speed: 132 mph (213 km/h, 115 kn)
- Cruise speed: 115 mph (185 km/h, 100 kn)
- Stall speed: 52 mph (84 km/h, 45 kn)
- Endurance: 4 hours
