= Victa Aircruiser =

1960s Australian four-seat touring monoplane

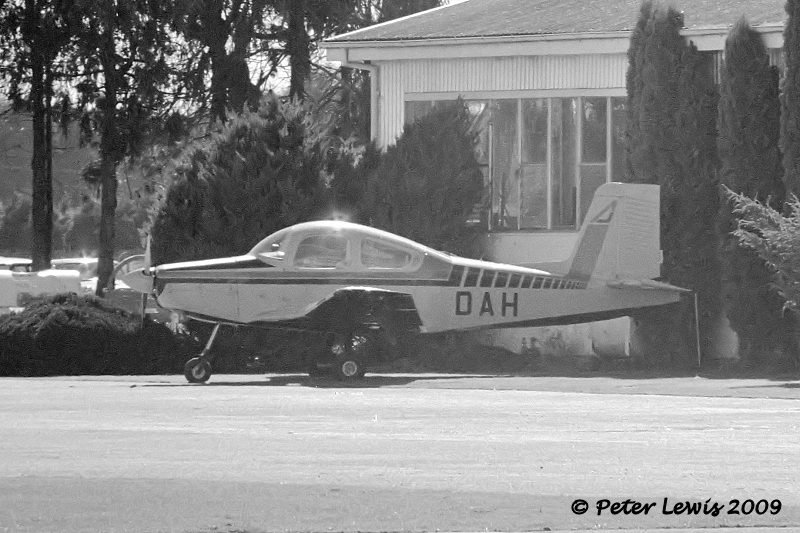
- The prototype Victa Aircruiser, registered in New Zealand as ZK-DAH

General information
- Type: Four-seat light touring monoplane
- National origin: Australia
- Manufacturer: Victa Ltd
- Designer: Henry Millicer
- Number built: 1

History
- First flight: 18 July 1966
- Developed from: Victa Airtourer
- Variant: AESL CT/4 Airtrainer

The Victa Aircruiser was a 1960s Australian four-seat touring monoplane designed by Henry Millicer and built as a single prototype by Victa Ltd. Victa completed certification work but did not place the aircraft into production. The design rights were later sold to Aero Engine Services Limited (AESL) in 1969 and formed the basis of the PAC CT/4 military trainer.

== Design and development ==
Following the success of the earlier Victa Airtourer two-seat trainer, Millicer designed a four-seat derivative designated the Aircruiser. The prototype, registered VH-MVR, first flew in July 1966. Like the Airtourer it was a low-wing aircraft with fixed tricycle landing gear and was powered by a 210 hp (160 kW) Continental IO-360 piston engine. Unlike the Airtourer’s sliding canopy, the Aircruiser featured a fixed cabin roof with a conventional door on the left-hand side.

Although Victa completed certification testing, the Aircruiser did not proceed to production. Victa closed its aviation division after failing to obtain financial assistance from the Australian government. Both Victa and Transavia Corporation sought subsidies for Australian-designed and built light aircraft; Victa sought support of up to 60 per cent of factory cost, but the proposal was rejected.

After AESL acquired the Airtourer rights, the Aircruiser rights were also sold to AESL in 1969. Under AESL, chief designer Pat Monk reworked the concept into the AESL CT/4 Airtrainer, a fully aerobatic military trainer.

In 2013, Brumby Aircraft Australia announced that it had acquired the type certificate for the Aircruiser as the basis for a modernised derivative, the Brumby Aircruiser.

== Specifications ==
Data from Jane's All the World's Aircraft 1966–67

General characteristics

- Crew: 1
- Capacity: 3
- Length: 23 ft 3 in (7.09 m)
- Wingspan: 26 ft 0 in (7.92 m)
- Height: 8 ft 6 in (2.59 m)
- Wing area: 129 sq ft (12.0 m^{2})
- Empty weight: 1,350 lb (612 kg)
- Max takeoff weight: 2,400 lb (1,089 kg)
- Fuel capacity: 42 imp gal (50 US gal; 190 L) usable fuel
- Powerplant: 1 × Rolls-Royce/Continental IO-360-D piston engine, 210 hp (160 kW)
- Propellers: 2-bladed Hartzell constant-speed propeller

Performance

- Cruise speed: 170 mph (270 km/h, 150 kn) at 6,500 ft (2,000 m) (maximum cruise)
- Stall speed: 56 mph (90 km/h, 49 kn) (flaps down)
- Never exceed speed: 243 mph (391 km/h, 211 kn) (maximum diving speed)
- Range: 1,000 mi (1,600 km, 870 nmi)
- Service ceiling: 16,000 ft (4,900 m)
- Rate of climb: 1,200 ft/min (6.1 m/s)
- Take-off run to 50 ft (15 m): 1,200 ft (370 m)
- Landing run from 50 ft (15 m): 1,270 ft (390 m)

== See also ==
- Victa Airtourer
- PAC CT/4
- Brumby Aircruiser

== Bibliography ==
- Simpson, R. W. (1991). Airlife's General Aviation. England: Airlife Publishing. ISBN 1-85310-194-X.
- Taylor, John W. R. (1966). Jane's All the World's Aircraft 1966–67. Sampson Low, Marston & Company, Ltd.
- Taylor, John W. R. (1967). Jane's All the World's Aircraft 1967–68. Sampson Low, Marston & Company, Ltd.
