= AESL Airtourer =

Australian single-engine light utility aircraft, 1959

Victa Airtourer
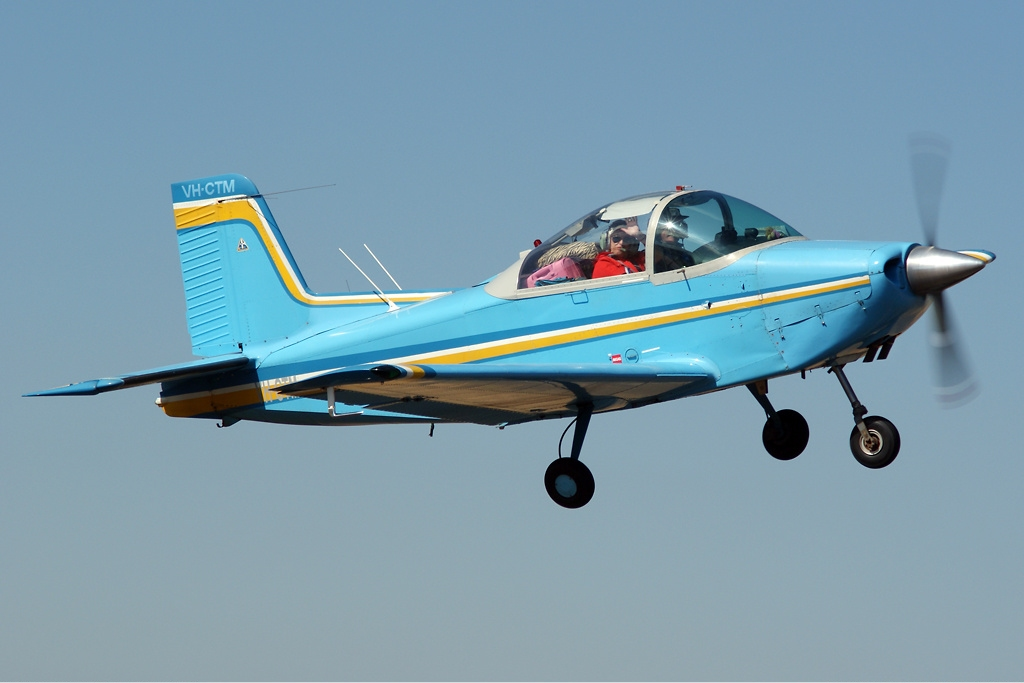
- AESL Airtourer 100/A1 inflight near Shepparton Airport

General information
- Type: Light utility aircraft
- Manufacturer: Victa Ltd, AESL
- Designer: Henry Millicer
- Number built: 168 (Aust); 80 (NZ)

History
- Manufactured: 1962–1966 (100 and 115, Victa); 1967–1973 (115 and 150, AESL)
- Introduction date: 1962 (100); 1963 (115)
- First flight: 31 March 1959 (100); 17 September 1962 (115); September 1968 (150); November 1968 (Super 150)
- Variant: Victa Aircruiser

The Victa Airtourer is an all-metal light low-wing monoplane touring aircraft that was developed in Australia, and was manufactured in both Australia and New Zealand.

== Design and development ==
The Airtourer was the winning design, submitted by Henry Millicer, the chief aerodynamicist of Australia's Government Aircraft Factories, in a competition organised by Britain's Royal Aero Club in 1953. A wooden prototype was constructed by a small group of enthusiasts (the Air Tourer Group of the Australian Ultra Light Aircraft Association) in the Melbourne suburb of Williamstown during the late 1950s. This prototype, registered VH-FMM (nicknamed Foxtrot Mickey Mouse) was first flown on 31 March 1959 by Flt. Lt.Randell Green at Moorabbin airport.

The Airtourer design is of cantilever low-wing monoplane configuration, with a fixed tricycle landing gear. It has interconnected ailerons and flaps, with both systems functioning as both ailerons and as flaps when operated. The nosewheel was steerable. Space was available for luggage (45 kg weight limit).

The prototype was demonstrated to aero clubs and flying schools as a possible replacement for existing training aircraft, mostly Tiger Moths and Chipmunks. After trial flights over Melbourne and then to the Latrobe Valley Airport, development continued to the all-metal version. The all-metal prototype to production standard (VH-MVA) followed on 12 December 1961.

Interest was shown in the design by Mervyn Richardson, Chairman of Victa Ltd, which at that time was best known for making lawn mowers and light two-stroke engines. Richardson was interested in entering an aviation-related industry. During the period 1961 to 1966, Victa Ltd. undertook production of the all-metal Airtourer, building both 100 hp and 115 hp models. Victa production continued until 1966.

As the Australian Government had rejected Victa's appeals for tariff protection assistance, or for direct subsidies to keep the production lines open, the company chose to suspend production of the Airtourer in February 1966, by which time it had built 172 Airtourers. While the Aviation division initially remained open to spares support for existing aircraft and to continue development of the four-seat Aircruiser, the division was completely shut down on 20 January 1967.

The manufacturing rights to the Airtourer were purchased the following year by the maintenance firm Aero Engine Services Ltd (AESL) in New Zealand where further production of 115 hp and 150 hp models took place until 1973.

Henry Millicer had designed the Victa Aircruiser, a four-seater derivative design, powered by a 210 hp Continental O-360 engine, which was certificated in 1967. AESL acquired the rights to the design in 1970 and it was used to form the basis of the CT/4 Airtrainer.

A total of 168 were completed or significantly completed by Victa in Sydney and a further 80 built by AESL in Hamilton NZ. Actually it would be correct to say that 170 serial numbers were issued by Victa and 80 by AESL.

Examination of the records show that some of the late serial numbers issued by Victa were completed in NZ and issued with a NZ serial number (starting at 501). In addition, some of the Victa-built aircraft were rebuilt in the factory by AESL and issued with NZ serial numbers which accounts for some duplication.

New Zealand pilot Cliff Tait used an Airtourer, ZK-CXU Miss Jacy, for a record breaking flight, circumnavigating the globe between May and August 1969 and covering 53,097 km in 288 flying hours. Miss Jacy is now on display at the MOTAT museum in Auckland.

The Australian Certificates of Type Approval for the Victa Air Tourer 100 and 115 are now held by the Airtourer Cooperative Ltd of New South Wales, Australia.

Some 90 aircraft remain in Australia with around 20 or so elsewhere, mainly in New Zealand and the United Kingdom.

=== Design notes ===
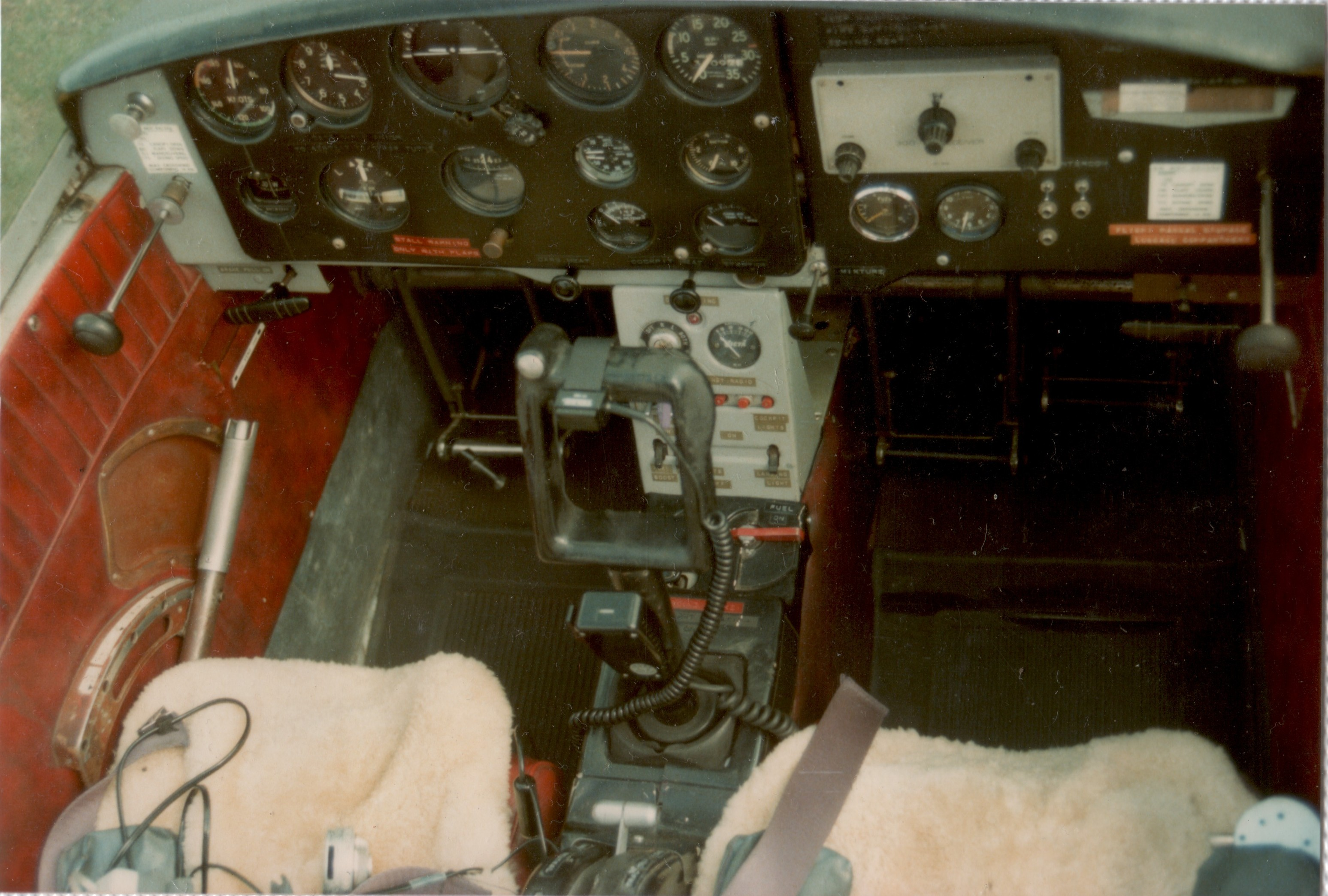
Airtourer 115 cockpit showing instruments and central control stick with dual grip that can be used by a pilot in either seat

VH-MVA was later re-engined and was the first Airtourer 115 around 1963. As for FMM, it is owned by the Museum of Victoria having last been displayed at the Australian Naval Aviation Museum in Nowra, NSW.

The Air Tourer was produced with a 'square hand grip' on the centrally located control stick.

== Variants ==
AESL produced 7 Airtourers from parts provided by Victa, before launching production of its own aircraft, ultimately produced in 7 different variants:

- T1 powered by a 100 hp Continental O-200 engine
- T2 powered by a 115 hp Lycoming O-235 engine
- T3 powered by a 130 hp Rolls-Royce O-240 engine
- T4 powered by a 150 hp Lycoming O-320-E1A – fixed-pitch propeller
- T5 powered by a 150 hp Lycoming O-320-E1A – constant speed propeller
- T6 initially a small run of 4 aircraft for the RNZAF, powered by a 150 hp Lycoming O-320-E1A – constant speed propeller with gross weight increased from T-5, and with a 24 volt electrical system.
- T8 powered by a 160 hp Lycoming AEIO-320 with fuel injection.

The T7 was offered as a T6 with fixed-pitch propeller, but no orders were received for this configuration.

== Operators ==
=== Military operators ===
==== Former military operators ====
Bangladesh

- Bangladesh Air Force – 3 aircraft

Thailand

- Royal Thai Police – One aircraft

Tonga

- Tongan Air Wing – One aircraft; in service for a short time in the 1980s.

New Zealand

- NZ Defence Force – 4 aircraft

== Specifications (Victa Airtourer AT.115) ==
Data from Jane's All The World's Aircraft 1966–67

General characteristics

- Crew: two
- Length: 6.55 m (21 ft 6 in)
- Wingspan: 7.92 m (26 ft 0 in)
- Height: 2.13 m (7 ft 0 in)
- Wing area: 11.15 m^{2} (120.0 sq ft)
- Aspect ratio: 5.65:1
- Empty weight: 490 kg (1,080 lb)
- Gross weight: 748 kg (1,649 lb)
- Fuel capacity: 132 L (35 US gal; 29 imp gal)
- Powerplant: 1 × Lycoming O-235-C1B air-cooled flat four piston engine, 86 kW (115 hp)
- Propellers: 2-bladed McCauley fixed-pitch metal propeller, 1.79 m (5 ft 10 in) diameter

Performance

- Maximum speed: 230 km/h (140 mph, 120 kn) at 1,220 m (4,000 ft)
- Cruise speed: 200 km/h (120 mph, 110 kn) at 1,500 metres (5,000 ft), (econ cruise, 65% power)
- Stall speed: 85 km/h (53 mph, 46 kn)
- Range: 1,140 km (710 mi, 620 nmi)
- Service ceiling: 4,300 m (14,000 ft)
- Rate of climb: 4.6 m/s (900 ft/min)
- Takeoff distance to 15 m (50 ft): 380 m (1,250 ft)
- Landing distance from 15 m (50 ft): 370 m (1,200 ft)

== Gallery ==
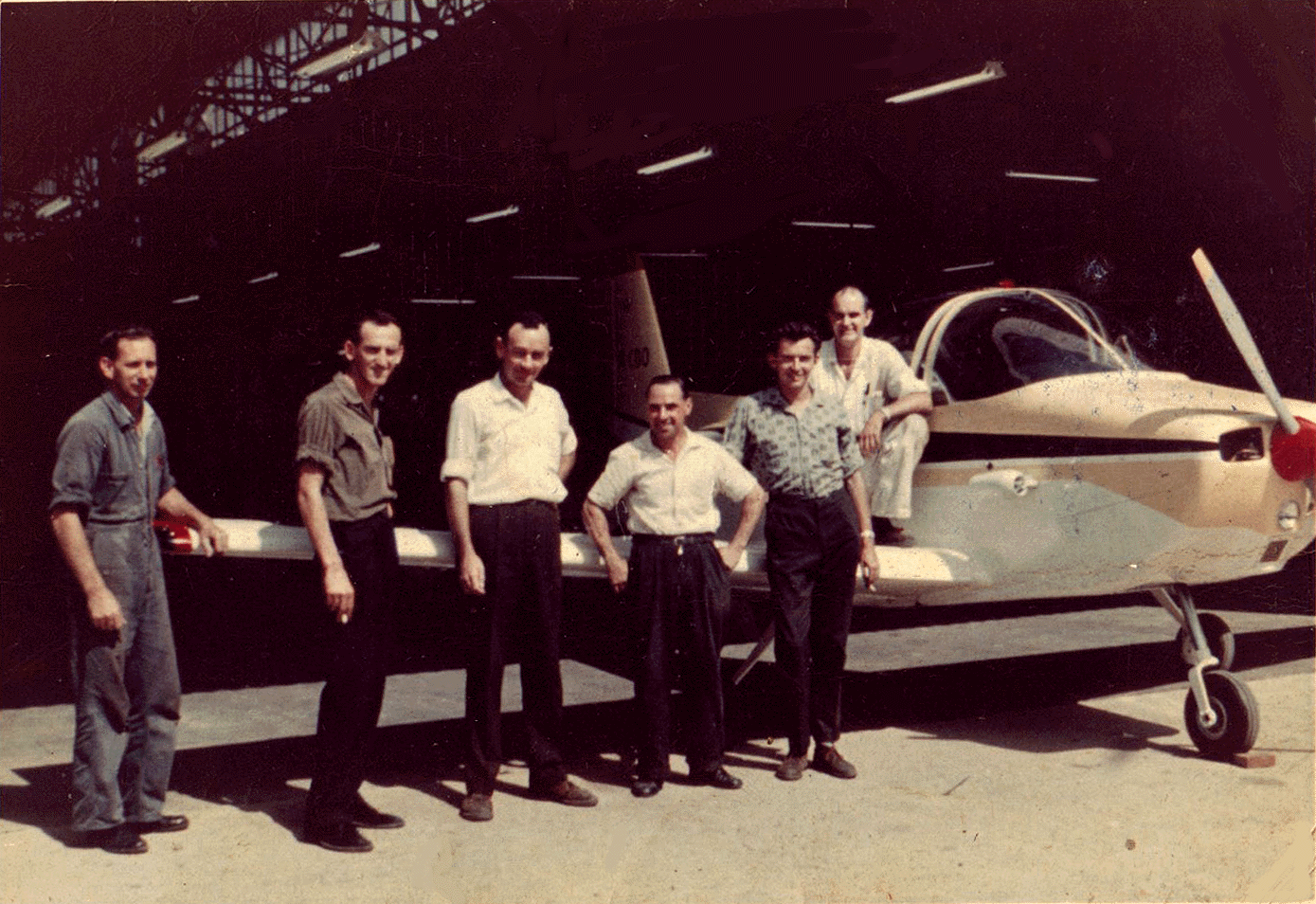
Victa factory staff in front of what's believed to be the first Airtourer exported to the USA

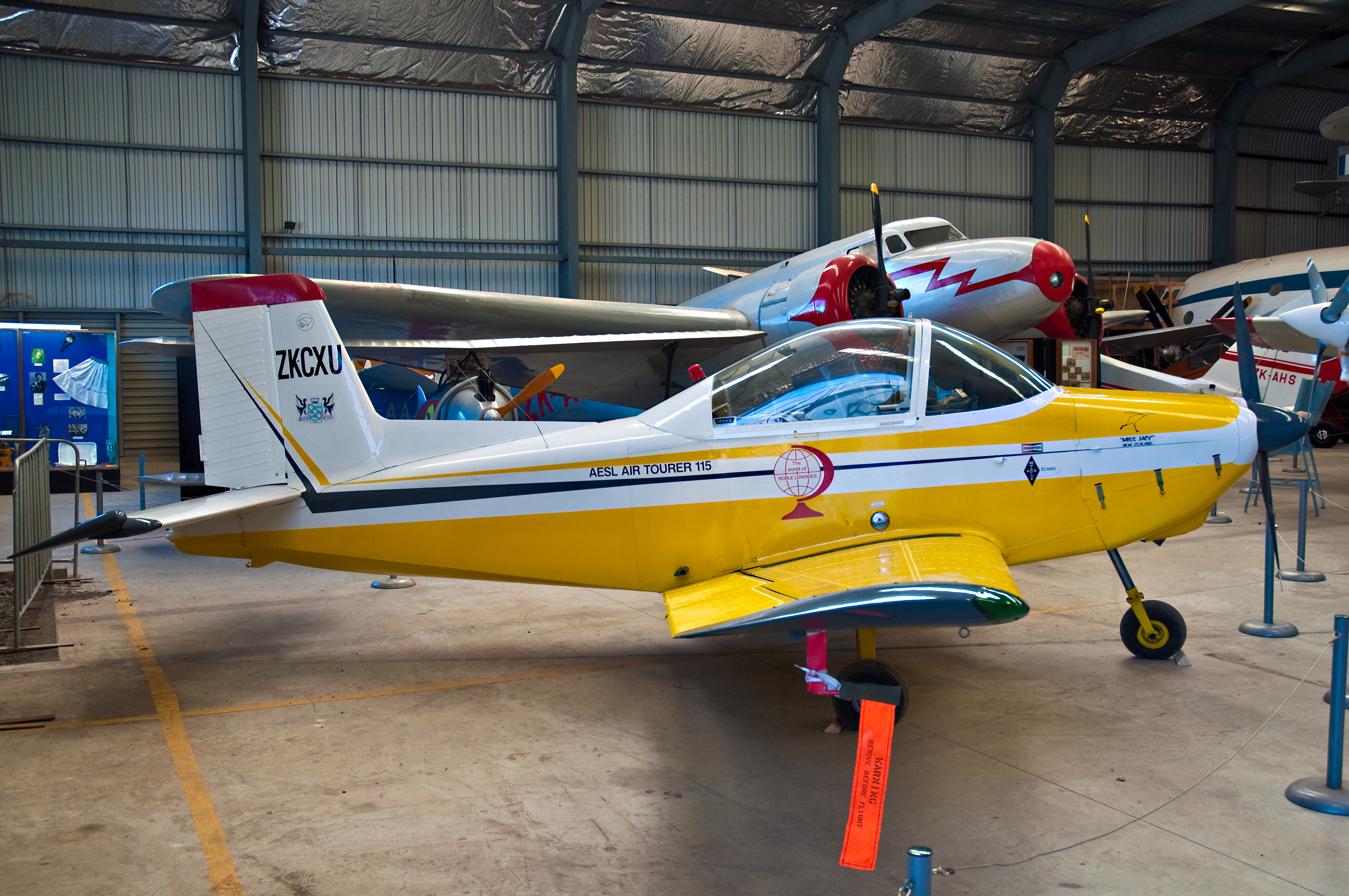
This aircraft was flown round the world in 1969 by Cliff Tait.
