= Cowra Airport =

- IATA: CWT; ICAO: YCWR

Summary
- Airport type: Public
- Operator: Cowra Shire Council
- Location: Cowra, New South Wales
- Elevation AMSL: 973 ft / 297 m
- Coordinates: 33°50′41″S 148°38′56″E

Map
- Location in New South Wales

Runways
Direction	Length		Surface
Direction	m	ft	Surface
15/33	1,630	5,348	Asphalt
03/21	1,166	3,825	Grass
- Sources: AIP

Cowra Airport (IATA: CWT, ICAO: YCWR) is a small airport located 2 nautical miles (3.7 km; 2.3 mi) west southwest of Cowra, New South Wales, Australia. The airport serves as the home to Brumby Aircraft Australia, a manufacturer of light sport and general aviation aircraft. Under a partnership deal signed between Brumby Aircraft and Aviation Industry Corporation of China in 2014, the companies have announced plans to establish an airport.

== See also ==
- List of airports in New South Wales
