= Victa =

Brand of Australian garden tools

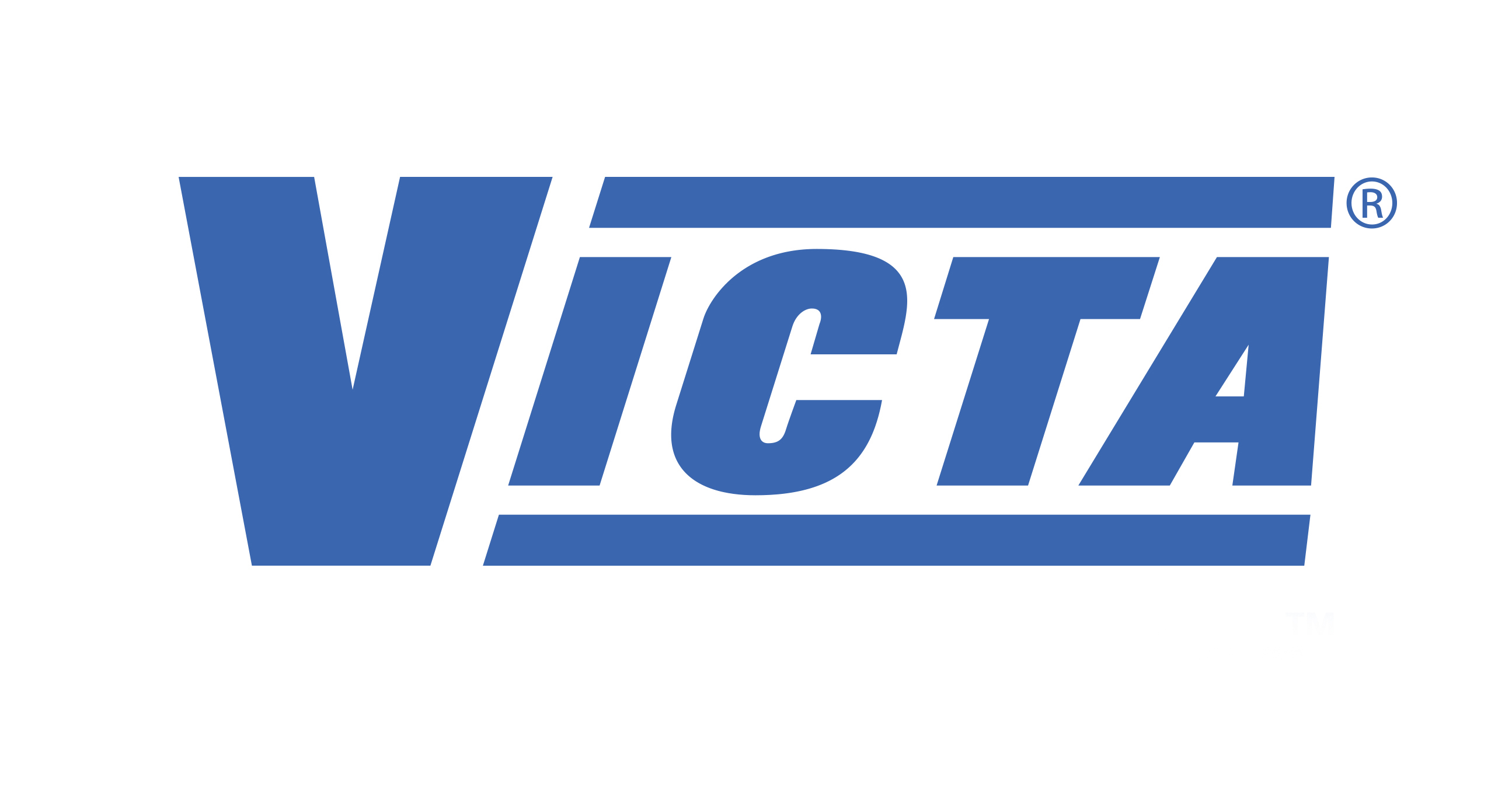

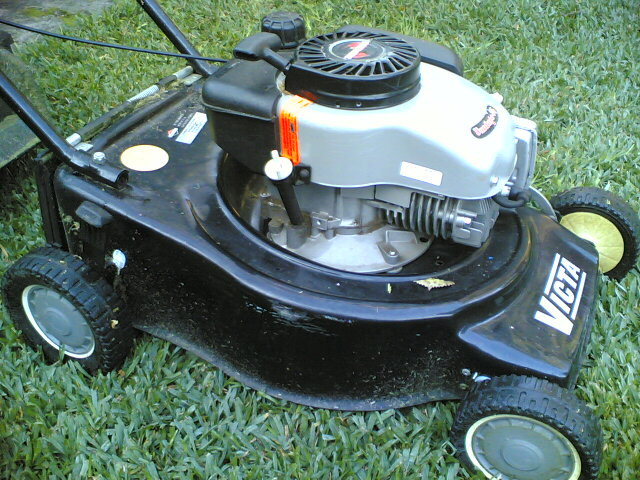
A Victa lawn mower

Victa is an Australian manufacturer of outdoor garden equipment, including petrol, electric, and battery-powered lawn mowers, edgers, trimmers, and chainsaws. The brand is best known as a manufacturer of rotary lawn mowers. In the early 1960s the company also built light aircraft, notably the Victa Airtourer, and project homes.

From 2008 to 2025, the Victa brand was owned by the American engine manufacturer Briggs & Stratton. In 2025, ownership returned to Australia with the Queensland based company Roy Gripske & Sons. In Australia and New Zealand, Victa products are sold through major hardware chains and specialist dealers, and some products are available through dealers in other countries.

== History ==
The Victa company was founded by Mervyn Victor Richardson in 1952. The name was derived from his middle name.

=== Lawn mowers ===
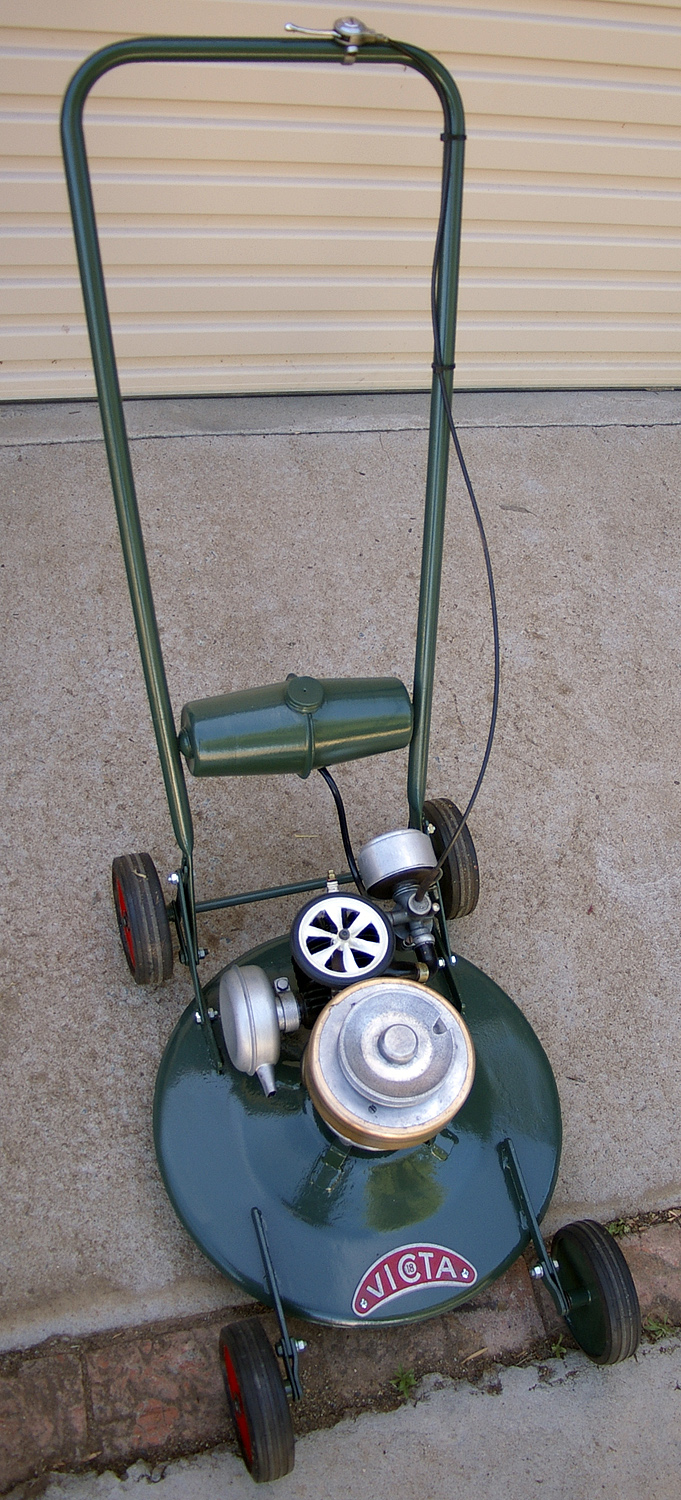
An early Victa lawn mower

Mervyn's son Garry mowed lawns to earn money in university holidays. Garry borrowed Mervyn's Victa 14" cylinder-based power mower which was heavy to transport and to operate. Mervyn wanted to design a new mower for his son's business. Mervyn had seen Lawrence Hall's "Mowhall" rotary lawn mower demonstrated in 1948. The heavy Mowhall was not a very successful invention because it required two people to use it, one to push and one to pull.

The Victa rotary lawn mower was developed in August 1952 by Richardson, in his backyard at Concord, New South Wales. Although not the first of its type, it was cheaper, lighter, and easier to use than earlier models.

Although Richardson had developed rotating reel mowers for his son's business, in August 1952 he decided to make a rotary lawn mower similar to the Mowhall, using a Villiers two-stroke engine mounted on its side but utilising a lighter base plate, allowing use by a single operator. He wanted it to be cheaper, lighter and more powerful. It was called the "Peach-Tin Prototype", so named because it was made out of scrap metal with a peach tin used as a fuel tank.

Initially selling the mowers from his home, by 1953, demand for the mowers was so strong that Richardson gave up his job and became full-time manager of his new company, Victa Mowers Pty Ltd.

By 2002, 6.5 million Victa mowers had been sold in 30 countries.

=== 1960s diversification ===
In the early 1960s, the firm diversified into other industries: it manufactured the "red phone" (a private payphone system, for use in business premises), aircraft, and, for a short while, Victa project homes.

In 1960, Victa Consolidated Industries, later renamed Victa Ltd, undertook to build 50 Victa Airtourers, a light monoplane designed by Henry Millicer, under Mervyn Victor Richardson, who had an interest in aeroplanes. The company set up an Aviation Division at their Milperra base, and also produced the Victa Aircruiser and Victa Gyroplane. Victa built 168 of the aircraft in Sydney before selling off the division to New Zealand company AESL in 1966. The Airtourer proved very popular, boosted by Victa's purchase plan whereby owners could pay off the cost in instalments.

Although certification was obtained, the Aircruiser was never put into production by Victa, as they withdrew that arm of their operations in 1966-7 after the government would not grant them a financial advantage to protect the local industry over imported aeroplanes. The same fate befell the Victa R-2, a prototype single-engine four-seat light aircraft. Only one was built, which first flew in February 1961, but no production followed.

In the 1960s, Victa produced a range of project homes in Australia.

== Company ==
In 1953 Richardson gave up his job and became full-time manager of Victa Mowers Pty Ltd. In 1958, the company had moved to a new factory at Milperra, New South Wales, and its 3,000 employees were building 143,000 mowers a year for export to 28 countries.

From the outset, the company used marketing and advertising effectively. It was a pioneer in Australian TV advertising, and also advertised extensively in newspaper and print media. Victa set up a network of distributors, who were thoroughly trained in promotion and sales.

In the 1960s, Mervyn's son Garry Richardson started playing a more important role in the company, becoming chairman in 1965.

In 1970 Victa was acquired by Sunbeam Corporation Ltd.

In 1994 the factory moved to Campsie, and the seven millionth Victa lawnmower was built in 1997.

In 1996, the company was sold to GUD Holdings Limited, who sold the Victa Lawn Care business to American-based Briggs & Stratton for A$23 million in 2008.

Victa returned to Australian ownership in 2025 when it was acquired by Roy Gripske & Sons.

=== Today ===
While most design and manufacturing capability has remained in Australia, such as assembly, research and development, and parts manufacture, all engine products are sourced from Briggs & Stratton's Facilities in Milwaukee, Wisconsin.

Outdoor garden equipment, including petrol, electric, and battery-powered lawn mowers, edgers, trimmers, and chainsaws are sold under the Victa brand.

Victa is also sold in limited quantities through specialist dealers internationally.

== Legacy ==
The Victa Lawnmower regarded by many as an Australian icon, and it was included in the opening ceremony of the Sydney 2000 Olympic Games. A retro advertisement for Victa is on permanent display at Museum Railway Station in Sydney.

The Richardson radial aero-engine, the Victa prototype lawnmower (1952), the Victa Peach Tin prototype, and other important Victa lawn mowers were donated to the Powerhouse Museum in Sydney. The Powerhouse held an exhibition entitled Victa – 70 years turning grass into lawns in 2023.

The archive of Philip Larkin's work at University of Hull includes the blue Victa lawn mower involved in the incident that inspired his famous poem 'The Mower'.

== See also ==
- City of Canada Bay Museum
