= PAC CT/4 Airtrainer =

New Zealand training aircraft

CT/4 Airtrainer
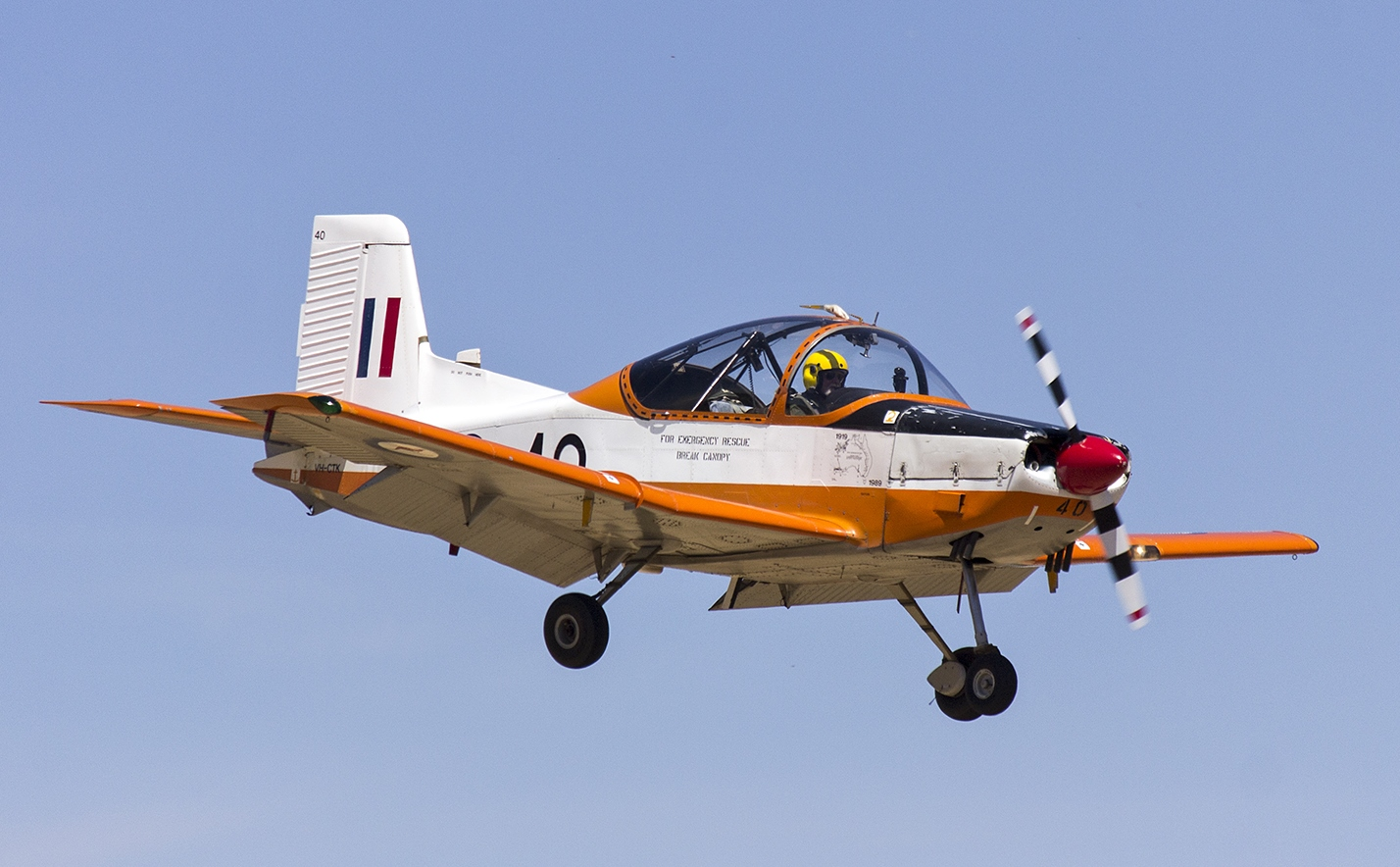
- RAAF CT/4 in flight

General information
- Type: Fixed-wing Primary trainer
- National origin: New Zealand
- Manufacturer: Pacific Aerospace NZAero
- Status: Currently manufactured by NZAero
- Primary users: Royal New Zealand Air Force (historical) Royal Australian Air Force; BAE Systems Australia; Royal Thai Air Force
- Number built: 154

History
- Manufactured: 1972–2008 2026-present
- First flight: 23 February 1972
- Retired: Royal New Zealand Air Force, 4 December 2014
- Developed from: Victa Aircruiser

The Pacific Aerospace Corporation CT/4 Airtrainer series is an all-metal-construction, single-engine, two-place with side-by-side seating, fully aerobatic, piston-engined, basic training aircraft manufactured in Hamilton, New Zealand.

== History ==
Pacific Aerospace Corporation predecessor, AESL, derived the CT/4 from the earlier four-seat prototype Victa Aircruiser, itself a development of the original Victa Airtourer two-seat light tourer, 172 of which had been built in Australia from 1961 to 1966 before the rights to the Airtourer and Aircruiser were sold to the New Zealand company AESL, which built a total of 80 Airtourers at its factory at Hamilton in the 1970s.

In 1971, the Royal Australian Air Force had a requirement for the replacement of the CAC Winjeels used as basic trainers at RAAF Point Cook. AESL's chief designer, P W C Monk, based the new aircraft on the stronger airframe of the Aircruiser. Externally the CT/4 differs from the Airtourer and Aircruiser designs by its larger engine and the bubble canopy—designed in an aerofoil shape. Structurally there are changes to the skin and upgrades of the four longerons in the fuselage from sheet metal to extrusions.

The CT/4 prototype first flew on 23 February 1972. Two prototypes were built, and on 1 March 1973 AESL became New Zealand Aerospace Industries Ltd. Production was launched against an order for 24 from the Royal Thai Air Force. The type was then selected as the primary trainer for the Royal Australian Air Force. The 64th machine was the first CT/4B, with detail improvements, mostly in instrumentation. The CT/4B was ordered by the Royal New Zealand Air Force (19) and 14 were ordered ostensibly by a Swiss company, Breco Trading Co, on behalf of a Swiss flying club. Breco was discovered to be a sanctions busting front for the Rhodesian Air Force. These aircraft were then embargoed by the New Zealand government after being built and spent six years in storage before being sold to the Royal Australian Air Force. This caused financial difficulties for the manufacturer, which led to the firm re-emerging as the Pacific Aerospace Corporation.

For several years Airtrainer production ceased, although the type remained nominally available for orders. In 1991, in an attempt to win a lucrative United States Air Force contract, two new developments of the CT/4 airframe were flown—the CT/4C turboprop and the CT/4E with a 300 hp piston engine, a three-bladed propeller, 100 mm longer fuselage and wing attachments moved rearwards. Neither attracted production orders at the time but, in 1998, CT/4E production commenced with orders for the Royal New Zealand Air Force for 13 and Royal Thai Air Force for 16. Both nations used the CT/4E to replace their earlier model CT/4A and B.

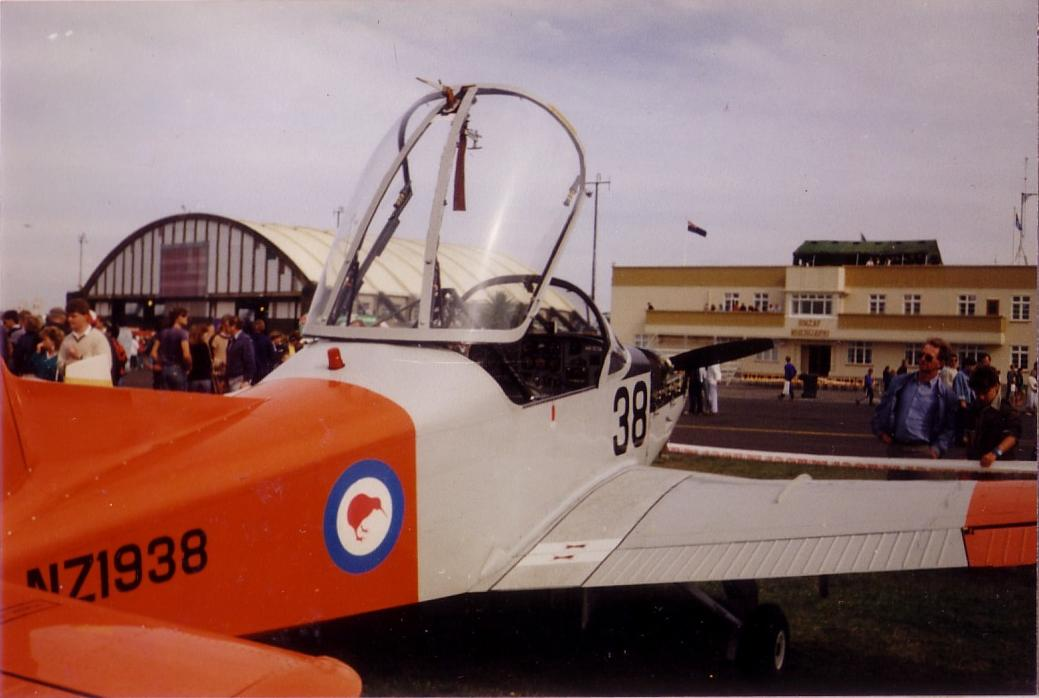
A CT/4B of the RNZAF in the late 1980s

The CT/4 proved to be an agile and capable military training aircraft. It is currently in use with the RTAF and was formerly used by the RAAF (until primary training was sub contracted) and by the Royal New Zealand Air Force until replaced by the Beechcraft T-6C. In Australia the type is commonly known as the plastic parrot, (a reference to its original gaudy RAAF colour scheme—the aircraft is, in fact, of all-aluminium construction). Many former RAAF and RNZAF aircraft are owned by private pilots and by companies contracted to provide training for airforces or airlines. One new-build CT/4E was built for a private Israeli owner in 1999. Two CT/Es were delivered to the Singapore Youth Flying Club in 2002. In 2004 and 2005 a further 8 CT/4Es were delivered to the Royal Thai Air Force to bring the total of RTAF CT/4Es to 24. The last CT/4 produced so far has been a CT/4E built for use as a company demonstrator, and in 2013 it was shown at the Airshow at Durban, South Africa.

A total of 155 aircraft had been built by 2024.

== Variants ==
- CT/4: Two prototypes, the first example was used by AESL to develop the CT/4 to meet RAAF requirements, retained by AESL/NZAI until NZAI bankruptcy in 1982. The second example the only single control CT/4 built, presented by NZAI to the Thai King, later used by the Royal Thai Police.
- CT/4A: Powered by a 210 hp Continental piston engine. The initial production design, 75 built, 24 for the RTAF and 51 for the RAAF.
- CT/4B: Powered by a 210 hp Continental piston engine.
  A version of the CT/4A with minimal changes to suit the RNZAF, 19 built for the RNZAF, 6 for the RTAF and 12 for Ansett/British Aerospace Flying Academy (now BAE Systems) at Tamworth, New South Wales.
- CT/4C: Powered by an Alison 250 turboprop and with a three-bladed propeller, a single prototype was rebuilt from a damaged RNZAF CT/4B. After a successful flight-test programme and unsuccessful marketing programme the prototype CT/4C was returned to CT/4B standard. Not put into production
- CT/4CR: A proposed retractable undercarriage Alison 250 turboprop powered model that was never built.
- CT/4D: Original designation for RNZAF model
- CT/4E: Powered by a 300 hp Lycoming and with a three-bladed propeller and the wing moved 5 cm rearwards to compensate for the altered centre of gravity. The CT/4E was a significant update designed to compete for a USAF requirement. 1 aircraft was converted from an ex-RAAF CT/4A and the remaining 41 were new built CT/4Es. 13 for the RNZAF, 24 for the RTAF, 2 for the SYFC, 1 for an Israeli customer and a demonstrator built for PAC in 2007, the 155th and last CT/4 built to date.
- CT-4F "Akala": A 300 hp version offered for an RAAF requirement, in conjunction with Raytheon Australia, with glass cockpit avionics from the Hawker Beechcraft T-6B T-6 Texan II. One demonstrator converted in May 2007 from the CT/4E prototype, itself originally a RAAF CT/4A.
- B.F.16: (Thai: บ.ฝ.๑๖) Royal Thai Armed Forces designation for the CT/4A and CT/4B.
- B.F.16A: (Thai: บ.ฝ.๑๖ก) Royal Thai Armed Forces designation for the CT/4E.

== Operators ==
Australia

- Royal Australian Air Force
  - One CT/4A is preserved airworthy at the RAAF Museum and operated by No. 100 Squadron RAAF (the RAAF's heritage squadron)

== Former operators ==
Australia

- Australian Defence Force Basic Flying Training School (in conjunction with BAE Systems, Tamworth, New South Wales)
- No. 1 Flying Training School RAAF
- Aircraft Research and Development Unit, RAAF
- Central Flying School RAAF
- RMIT University

New Zealand

- Royal New Zealand Air Force
- Central Flying School and Pilot Training Squadron formerly pooled 13 aircraft. Retired on 4 December 2014.

Thailand

- Royal Thai Air Force Aircraft decommissioned 2020
- Royal Thai Police – one aircraft only.

Singapore

- Singapore Youth Flying Club 2 aircraft operated between 2002 and 2010

== Specifications (CT4E) ==
Data from Jane's All The World's Aircraft 2003–2004; PAC Pilot's Operating Handbook and Flight Manual for the CT4-E Airtrainer

General characteristics

- Crew: two: student, instructor
- Length: 7.201 m (23 ft 7.5 in)
- Wingspan: 7.92 m (26 ft 0 in)
- Height: 2.59 m (8 ft 6 in)
- Wing area: 11.98 m^{2} (129 sq ft)
- Aspect ratio: 5.2:1
- Empty weight: 770 kg (1,700 lb)
- Gross weight: 1,180 kg (2,600 lb)
- Max takeoff weight: 1,180 kg (2,600 lb)
- Powerplant: 1 × Lycoming AEIO-540-L1B5 flat-six piston engine, 224 kW (300 hp)
- Propellers: Hartzell Propeller HC-C3YR-4BF / FC7663-2R 1 per engine

Performance

- Maximum speed: 387 km/h (240 mph, 209 kn) at sea level
- Cruise speed: 282 km/h (175 mph, 152 kn) at 2,590 m (8,500 ft) (75% power)
- Stall speed: 82 km/h (51 mph, 44 kn) (flaps down)
- Never exceed speed: 387 km/h (240 mph, 209 kn)
- Range: 963 km (599 mi, 520 nmi) (max fuel, 75% power)
- Service ceiling: 5,550 m (18,200 ft)
- Rate of climb: 9.3 m/s (1,830 ft/min)

== See also ==
Aircraft of a similar role, configuration and era

- SIAI-Marchetti SF.260

== Gallery ==
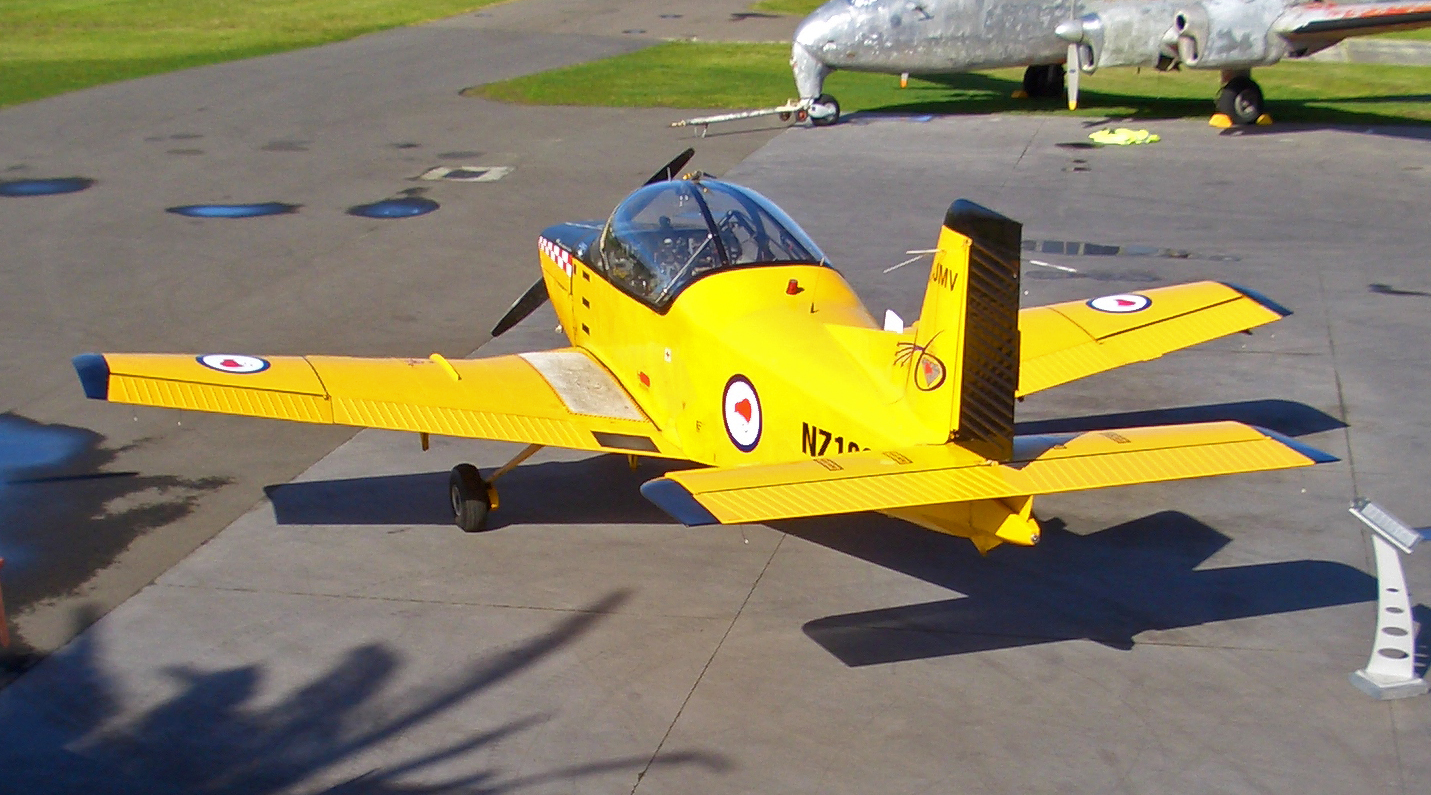
CT-4B at Tauranga, New Zealand, 2006
